= List of Scranton/Wilkes-Barre Highlanders seasons =

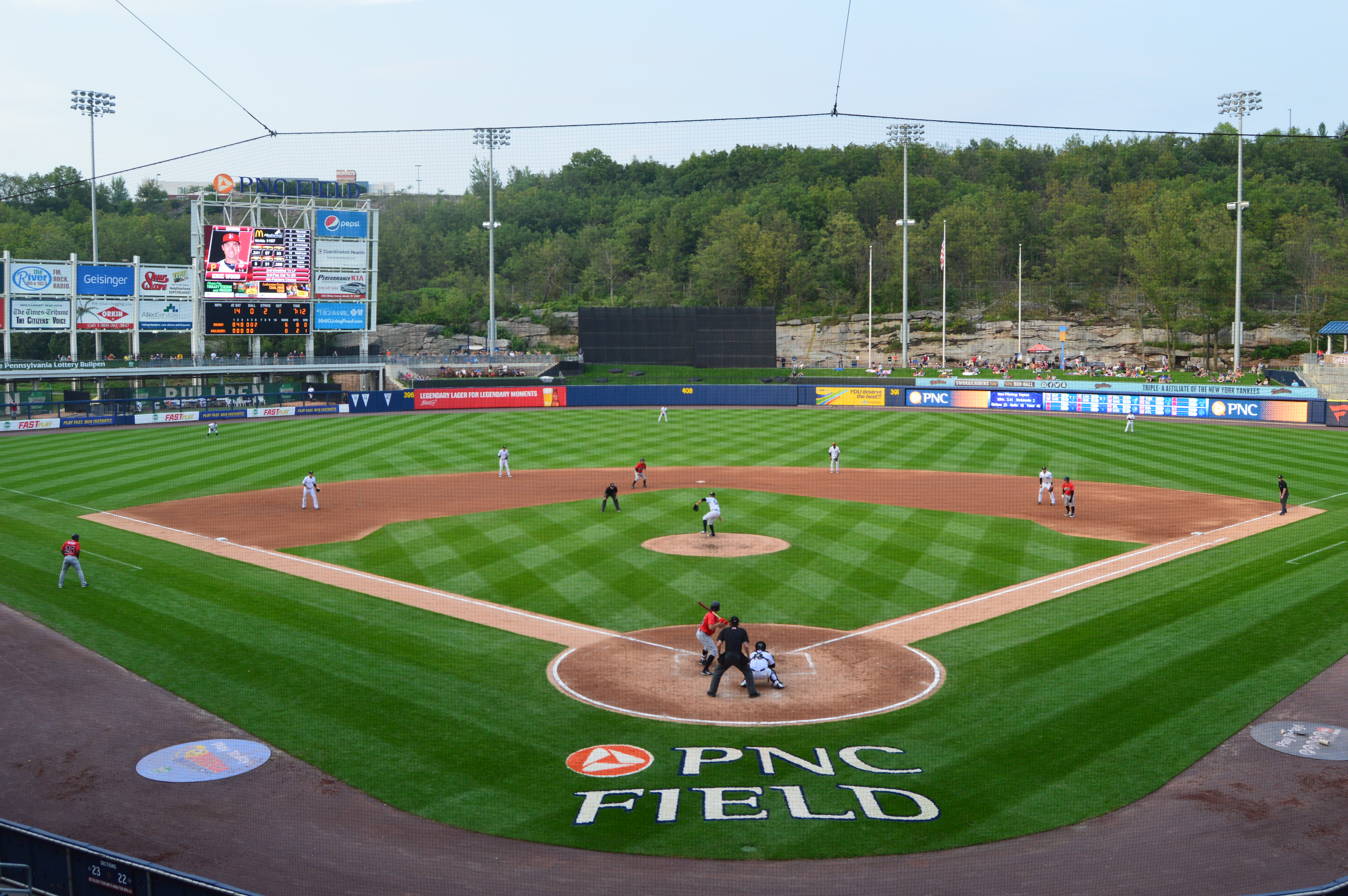
The Scranton/Wilkes-Barre Highlanders have played at PNC Field, formerly Lackawanna County Stadium, since 1989.

The Scranton/Wilkes-Barre Highlanders are a Minor League Baseball team that plays in the Scranton–Wilkes-Barre metropolitan area of Pennsylvania. Founded as members of the Triple-A classification International League (IL) in 1989, the team was known as the Scranton/Wilkes-Barre Red Barons during their Major League Baseball (MLB) affiliation with the Philadelphia Phillies from 1989 to 2006. They became known as the Scranton/Wilkes-Barre Yankees in 2007 after affiliating with the New York Yankees, rebranding as the RailRiders in 2013 while maintaining their affiliation with New York. In conjunction with the 2021 restructuring of the minor leagues, the RailRiders were placed in the new Triple-A East (AAAE) in 2021, but this league was renamed the International League in 2022. The team rebranded to the Highlanders after the 2026 season.

The team has played 5,292 regular-season games and compiled a win–loss record of 2,830–2,462, resulting in a winning percentage of .535. The Highlanders' best regular-season record occurred in 2016 when they finished 91–53 (.636). Conversely, their worst record was 62–80 (.437), which they recorded in both 1993 and 1994. The Highlanders have won two International League championships (2008 and 2016) and one Triple-A championship (2016). They have also claimed thirteen division titles, including five consecutive division championships from 2006 to 2010, three wild card playoff berths as well as a half-season title (2025). The Highlanders experienced a difficult start, making only one postseason appearance in their first ten seasons—an IL championship series berth in 1992—which was also their only winning season during that span. However, under manager Dave Miley (2007–2015), the team enjoyed a sustained period of success, reaching the postseason four straight times and winning seven division titles. Miley also guided them to two IL championship series, winning in 2008 and finishing as the runner-up in 2009.

== Season-by-season records ==
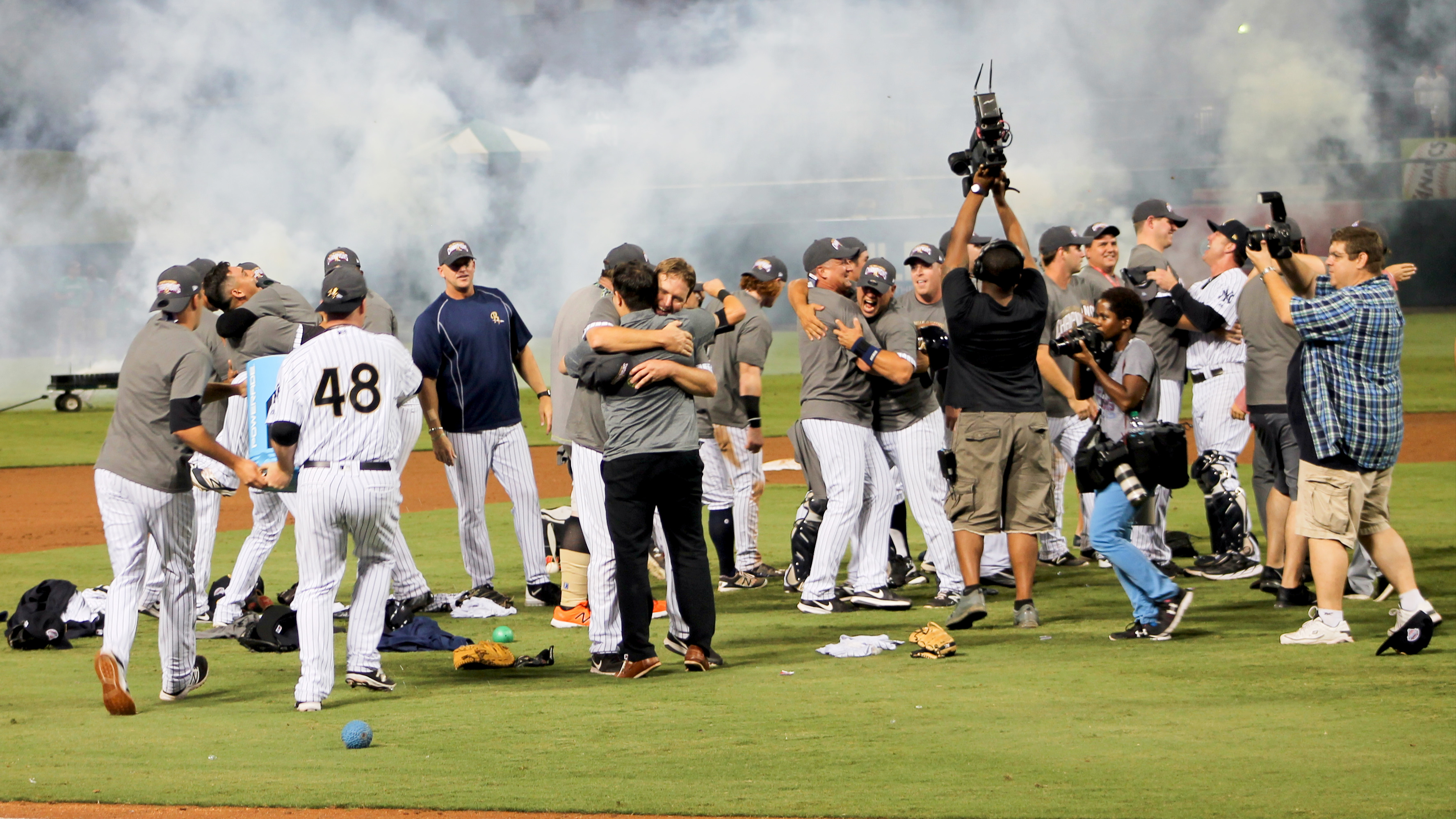
The Highlanders (then RailRiders) celebrating their 2016 Triple-A championship win

Key
League	The team's final position in the league standings
Division	The team's final position in the divisional standings
GB	Games behind the team that finished in first place in the division that season
Apps.	Postseason appearances: number of seasons the team qualified for the postseason
‡	Class champions (1989–present)
†	League champions (1989–present)
*	Division champions (1989–2022)
^	Postseason berth (1992–present)

Season-by-season records
Season	League	Regular-season					Postseason			MLB affiliate	Ref.
Season	League	Record	Win %	League	Division	GB	Record	Win %	Result	MLB affiliate	Ref.
1989	IL	64–79	.448	7th	3rd	18	—	—	Result	—	Philadelphia Phillies
1990	IL	68–78	.466	5th	2nd	21 1/2	—	—	—		Philadelphia Phillies
1991	IL	65–78	.455	7th	4th	14	—	—	—		Philadelphia Phillies
1992 *	IL	84–58	.592	2nd	1st	—	5–4	.556	Won Eastern Division title Won semifinals vs. Pawtucket Red Sox, 3–1; Lost IL championship vs. Columbus Clippers, 3–2		Philadelphia Phillies
1993	IL	62–80	.437	8th	3rd	12 1/2	—	—	—		Philadelphia Phillies
1994	IL	62–80	.437	10th	5th	16	—	—	—		Philadelphia Phillies
1995	IL	70–72	.493	8th	4th	3	—	—	—		Philadelphia Phillies
1996	IL	70–72	.493	5th	3rd	8	—	—	—		Philadelphia Phillies
1997	IL	66–76	.465	8th	3rd	17 1/2	—	—	—		Philadelphia Phillies
1998	IL	67–75	.472	11th	6th	13 1/2	—	—	—		Philadelphia Phillies
1999 *	IL	78–66	.542	5th	1st	—	2–3	.400	Won Northern Division title Lost semifinals vs. Charlotte Knights, 3–2		Philadelphia Phillies
2000^	IL	85–60	.586	2nd	2nd	1	5–4	.556	Won wild card berth Won semifinals vs. Buffalo Bisons, 3–1; Lost IL championship vs. Indianapolis Indians, 3–2		Philadelphia Phillies
2001^	IL	78–65	.545	4th	2nd	13 1/2	3–3	.500	Won wild card berth Won semifinals vs. Buffalo Bisons, 3–2; Lost IL championship vs. Louisville RiverBats, 1–0 (Note: The 2001 playoffs were cancelled in the wake of the September 11 terrorist attacks. Louisville, which had won the first game of the series before its cancellation, was declared the winner.)		Philadelphia Phillies
2002 *	IL	91–53	.632	1st	1st	—	0–3	.000	Won Northern Division title Lost semifinals vs. Buffalo Bisons, 3–0		Philadelphia Phillies
2003	IL	73–70	.510	7th (tie)	3rd (tie)	9 1/2	—	—	—		Philadelphia Phillies
2004	IL	69–73	.486	8th	4th	13	—	—	—		Philadelphia Phillies
2005	IL	69–75	.479	9th (tie)	5th (tie)	13	—	—	—		Philadelphia Phillies
2006 *	IL	84–58	.592	1st	1st	—	1–3	.250	Won Northern Division title Lost semifinals vs. Rochester Red Wings, 3–1		Philadelphia Phillies
2007 *	IL	84–59	.587	1st	1st	—	1–3	.250	Won Northern Division title Lost semifinals vs. Richmond Braves, 3–1	New York Yankees	
2008 * †	IL	88–56	.611	1st (tie)	1st	—	6–3	.667	Won Northern Division title Won semifinals vs. Pawtucket Red Sox, 3–1; Won IL championship vs. Durham Bulls, 3–1; Lost Triple-A championship vs. Sacramento River Cats	New York Yankees	
2009 *	IL	81–60	.574	3rd	1st	—	3–4	.429	Won Northern Division title Won semifinals vs. Gwinnett Braves, 3–1; Lost IL championship vs. Durham Bulls, 3–0	New York Yankees	
2010 *	IL	87–56	.608	2nd	1st	—	1–3	.250	Won Northern Division title Lost semifinals vs. Columbus Clippers, 3–1	New York Yankees	
2011	IL	73–69	.514	7th	3rd	8	—	—	—	New York Yankees	
2012 *	IL	84–60	.583	2nd	1st	—	1–3	.250	Won Northern Division title Lost semifinals vs. Pawtucket Red Sox, 3–1	New York Yankees	
2013	IL	68–76	.472	10th	5th	12 1/2	—	—	—	New York Yankees	
2014	IL	68–76	.472	10th	5th	13 1/2	—	—	—	New York Yankees	
2015 *	IL	81–63	.563	3rd	1st	—	0–3	.000	Won Northern Division title Lost semifinals vs. Indianapolis Indians, 3–0	New York Yankees	
2016 * † ‡	IL	91–52	.636	1st	1st	—	7–1	.875	Won Northern Division title Won semifinals vs. Lehigh Valley IronPigs, 3–0; Won IL championship vs. Gwinnett Braves, 3–1; Won Triple-A championship vs. El Paso Chihuahuas	New York Yankees	
2017 *	IL	86–55	.610	1st	1st	—	4–4	.500	Won Northern Division title Won semifinals vs. Lehigh Valley IronPigs, 3–1; Lost IL championship vs. Durham Bulls, 3–1	New York Yankees	
2018^	IL	73–65	.529	3rd	2nd	10	5–4	.556	Won wild card berth Won semifinals vs. Lehigh Valley IronPigs, 3–1; Lost IL championship vs. Durham Bulls, 3–2	New York Yankees	
2019 *	IL	76–65	.539	5th	1st	—	0–3	.000	Won Northern Division title (Note: SWB finished the 2019 season tied for first with the Syracuse Mets, each with a 75–65 record. On September 3, SWB defeated Syracuse in a one-game playoff, 14–13, to win the Northern Division title.); Lost semifinals vs. Durham Bulls, 3–0	New York Yankees	
2020	IL	Season cancelled (COVID-19 pandemic)								New York Yankees	
2021	AAAE	75–52 (Note: In 2021, the team with the best record at the end of the regular-season was declared the Triple-A East champion. Scranton/Wilkes-Barre had a 68–49 (.581) record, 7 1/2 games behind first place, which put them 3rd in the league and 2nd in their division. The regular-season was followed by the Triple-A Final Stretch, a 10-game postseason tournament in which all 30 Triple-A clubs competed for the highest winning percentage. Scranton/Wilkes-Barre finished the tournament in 6th place with a 7–3 (.700) record.)	.591	3rd	2nd	4 1/2	—	—	—	New York Yankees	
2022	IL	83–67	.553	5th	2nd	3	—	—	—	New York Yankees	
2023	IL	73–75	.493	10th	6th	16 1/2	—	—	—	New York Yankees	
2024	IL	89–60	.597	2nd	1st	—	—	—	—	New York Yankees	
2025^	IL	87–60	.592	2nd	2nd	1/2	1–2	.333	Won second-half title Lost IL championship vs. Jacksonville Jumbo Shrimp, 2–1	New York Yankees	
2026	IL	78–68	.534	7th	4th	11	—	—	—	New York Yankees	
Totals	—	2,830–2,462	.535	—	—	—	45–53	.459	—	—	—

=== Split-season records ===
The International League, in which the Highlanders have been competing in since 1989, started to use a split-season format since 2023 in which the teams with the best league-wide records at the end of each half qualified for the playoffs.

Split-season records
Season	League	Half	Regular-season					Postseason			MLB affiliate	Ref.
Season	League	Half	Record	Win %	League	Division	GB	Record	Win %	Result	MLB affiliate	Ref.
2023	IL	1st	34–40	.459	13th	7th	14	—	—	Result	—	New York Yankees
2023	IL	2nd	39–35	.527	9th	7th	8 1/2	—	—		—	New York Yankees
2024	IL	1st	43–31	.581	3rd	2nd	6 1/2	—	—	—	New York Yankees	
2024	IL	2nd	46–29	.613	2nd	1st	2 1/2	—	—	—	New York Yankees	
2025	IL	1st	38–34	.528	8th	5th	7 1/2	1–2	.333	Won second-half title Lost IL championship vs. Jacksonville Jumbo Shrimp, 2–1	New York Yankees	
2025	IL	2nd	49–26	.653	1st	1st	—	1–2	.333	Won second-half title Lost IL championship vs. Jacksonville Jumbo Shrimp, 2–1	New York Yankees	
2026	IL	1st	37–37	.500	12th	6th	9 1/2	—	—	—	New York Yankees	
2026	IL	2nd	41–31	.569	4th	3rd	2 1/2	—	—	—	New York Yankees	

== Franchise totals ==
=== By classification ===
Franchise totals by classification
Classification	Regular-season		Postseason			Composite	
Classification	Record	Win %	Apps.	Record	Win %	Record	Win %
Triple-A (1989–2026)	2,830–2,462	.535	16	45–53	.463	2,875–2,515	.533
All-time	2,830–2,462	.535	16	45–53	.463	2,875–2,515	.533

=== By league ===
Franchise totals by league
League	Regular-season		Postseason			Composite	
League	Record	Win %	Apps.	Record	Win %	Record	Win %
Triple-A East / International League (1989–2026)	2,830–2,462	.535	16	45–53	.463	2,875–2,515	.533
All-time	2,830–2,462	.535	16	45–53	.463	2,875–2,515	.533

=== By affiliation ===
Franchise totals by affiliation
Affiliation	Regular-season		Postseason			Composite	
Affiliation	Record	Win %	Apps.	Record	Win %	Record	Win %
Philadelphia Phillies (1989–2006)	1,305–1,268	.507	6	16–20	.444	1,321–1,288	.506
New York Yankees (2007–2026)	1,512–1,194	.559	11	29–33	.468	1,541–1,227	.557
All-time	2,830–2,462	.535	16	45–53	.463	2,875–2,515	.533
