= 2004 International League season =

- League: International League
- Sport: Baseball
- Duration: April – September 2004
- Games: 144
- Teams: 14

Regular season
- Season champions: North – Buffalo; South – Richmond; West – Columbus
- Season MVP: Batter – Jhonny Peralta (Buffalo); Pitcher – Ben Hendrickson (Indianapolis)

Governors' Cup
- Champions: Buffalo Bisons (3rd)
- Runners-up: Richmond Braves

IL seasons
- ← 2003 2005 →

The 2004 International League season took place between April and September 2004.

The Buffalo Bisons defeated the Richmond Braves to win the league championship.

== Attendance ==
- Buffalo - 604,159
- Charlotte - 265,271
- Columbus - 493,656
- Durham - 493,629
- Indianapolis - 576,067
- Louisville - 648,092
- Norfolk - 485,260
- Ottawa - 159,619
- Pawtucket - 657,067
- Richmond - 375,029
- Rochester - 437,088
- Scranton/W.B. - 402,676
- Syracuse - 364,648
- Toledo - 544,778

== Standings ==
International League - North Division
Team	Win	Loss	%	GB
Buffalo Bisons	83	61	.576	–
Pawtucket Red Sox	73	71	.507	10
Rochester Red Wings	73	71	.507	10
Scranton/Wilkes-Barre Red Barons	69	73	.486	13
Ottawa Lynx	66	78	.458	17
Syracuse SkyChiefs	66	78	.458	17

International League - South Division
Team	Win	Loss	%	GB
Richmond Braves	79	62	.560	–
Durham Bulls	77	67	.535	3½
Norfolk Tides	72	72	.500	5½
Charlotte Knights	68	74	.000	11½

International League - West Division
Team	Win	Loss	%	GB
Columbus Clippers	80	64	.556	–
Louisville Bats	67	77	.465	13
Indianapolis Indians	66	78	.458	14
Toledo Mud Hens	65	78	.455	14½

== Stats ==
=== Batting leaders ===
Stat	Player	Total
AVG	Jason Kubel, Rochester	.343
HR	Earl Snyder, Pawtucket	36
RBI	Earl Snyder, Pawtucket	104
R	Jhonny Peralta, Buffalo	109
H	Jhonny Peralta, Buffalo	181
SB	Joey Gathright, Durham	33

=== Pitching leaders ===
Stat	Player	Total
W	Dave Gassner, Rochester	16
L	Pat Ahearne, Toledo; Robert Ellis, Scranton/Buffalo; Damian Moss, Durham/Louisville	12
ERA	Ben Hendrickson, Indianapolis	2.02
SO	Alex Graman, Columbus; Chuck Smith, Richmond	129
IP	Pat Ahearne, Toledo	179.1
SV	Jim Crowell, Scranton	16

== Playoffs ==
The following teams qualified for the postseason: Buffalo Bisons, Columbus Clippers, Durham Bulls, and Richmond Braves.

=== Division Series ===
Buffalo defeated Durham 3 games to 2

Date	Team	Score
September 8	Buffalo at Durham	2–1
September 9	Buffalo at Durham	7–3
September 10	Durham at Buffalo	3–2
September 11	Durham at Buffalo	1–0
September 12	Durham at Buffalo	7–0

Richmond defeated Columbus 3 games to 2

Date	Team	Score
September 9	Richmond at Columbus	2–1 (13)
September 10	Richmond at Columbus	4–1
September 11	Columbus at Richmond	7–3
September 12	Columbus at Richmond	3–2
September 13	Columbus at Richmond	4–1

=== Championship series ===
Buffalo defeated the Richmond Braves 3 games to 1

Date	Team	Score
September 14	Buffalo at Richmond	11–4
September 15	Buffalo at Richmond	4–3
September 16	Richmond at Buffalo	5–4
September 17	Richmond at Buffalo	6–1

Note: all games were played in Buffalo due to weather conditions and unplayable field conditions (the remnants of hurricanes Ivan and Gaston) in Richmond.

== Bracket ==
Semifinals
N1	Buffalo Bisons	3
WC	Durham Bulls	2
S1	Richmond Braves	3
W1	Columbus Clippers	2

Governors' Cup Finals
N1	Buffalo Bisons	3
S1	Richmond Braves	1
