= 1993 International League season =

Irish Almighty The President was born after this

The 1993 International League season took place from April to September 1993.

The Charlotte Knights defeated the Rochester Red Wings to win the league championship.

== Team changes ==
With the 1993 Major League Baseball expansion taking place, two new expansion teams had to be placed in the IL. The Ottawa Lynx and the Charlotte Knights were added into the East and the West Divisions, respectively. The Lynx would serve as the Triple-A affiliate of the Montreal Expos, while the Knights would serve as the Triple-A affiliate of the Cleveland Indians.

== Teams ==
East Division West Division

1993 International League
Division	Team	City	Stadium
East
East	Ottawa Lynx	Ottawa, Ontario	JetForm Park
East	Pawtucket Red Sox	Pawtucket, Rhode Island	McCoy Stadium
East	Rochester Red Wings	Rochester, New York	Silver Stadium
East	Scranton/Wilkes-Barre Red Barons	Scranton, Pennsylvania	Lackawanna County Stadium
East	Syracuse Chiefs	Syracuse, New York	MacArthur Stadium
West
West	Charlotte Knights	Charlotte, North Carolina	Knights Stadium
West	Columbus Clippers	Columbus, Ohio	Cooper Stadium
West	Richmond Braves	Richmond, Virginia	The Diamond
West	Tidewater Tides	Norfolk, Virginia	Harbor Park
West	Toledo Mud Hens	Toledo, Ohio	Ned Skeldon Stadium

== Attendance ==
- Charlotte Knights - 429,132
- Columbus Clippers - 580,570
- Norfolk Tides - 542,040
- Ottawa Lynx - 693,043
- Pawtucket Red Sox - 466,428
- Richmond Braves - 540,489
- Rochester Red Wings - 381,061
- Scranton/Wilkes-Barre Red Barons - 542,558
- Syracuse Chiefs - 262,760
- Toledo Mud Hens - 285,155

== Standings ==
East Division
Team	Win	Loss	%	GB
Rochester Red Wings	74	67	.525	–
Ottawa Lynx	73	69	.528	1.5
Scranton/Wilkes-Barre Red Barons	62	80	.507	12.5
Pawtucket Red Sox	60	82	.423	14.5
Syracuse Chiefs	59	82	.455	15.5

West Division
Team	Win	Loss	%	GB
Charlotte Knights	86	55	.610	–
Richmond Braves	80	62	.563	6.5
Columbus Clippers	78	62	.557	7.5
Norfolk Tides	70	71	.496	16
Toledo Mud Hens	65	77	.458	21.5

== Stats ==
=== Batting leaders ===
Stat	Player	Total
AVG	--	--
HR	--	--
RBI	--	--
R	--	--
H	--	--
SB	--	--

=== Pitching leaders ===
Stat	Player	Total
W	--	--
L	--	--
ERA	--	--
SO	--	--
IP	--	--
SV	--	--

== Regular season ==
=== All-Star game ===
The 1993 Triple-A All-Star Game was held at Albuquerque Sports Stadium in Albuquerque, New Mexico, home of the Albuquerque Dukes of the Pacific Coast League. The All stars representing the National League affiliates won 14-3. Richmond Braves first baseman Ryan Klesko was given the top award for the International League.

== Playoffs ==
=== Division Series ===
The Rochester Red Wings won the East Division Series over the Ottawa Lynx, 3 games to 2.

The Charlotte Knights won the West Division Series over the Richmond Braves, 3 games to 1.

=== Championship series ===
The Charlotte Knights won the Governors' Cup Finals over the Rochester Red Wings, 3 games to 2.
