= 1995 International League season =

The 1995 International League season took place from April to September 1995.

The Ottawa Lynx defeated the Norfolk Tides to win the league championship.

== Teams ==
East Division West Division

1995 International League
Division	Team	City	Stadium
East
East	Ottawa Lynx	Ottawa, Ontario	JetForm Park
East	Pawtucket Red Sox	Pawtucket, Rhode Island	McCoy Stadium
East	Rochester Red Wings	Rochester, New York	Silver Stadium
East	Scranton/Wilkes-Barre Red Barons	Scranton, Pennsylvania	Lackawanna County Stadium
East	Syracuse Chiefs	Syracuse, New York	MacArthur Stadium
West
West	Charlotte Knights	Charlotte, North Carolina	Knights Stadium
West	Columbus Clippers	Columbus, Ohio	Cooper Stadium
West	Richmond Braves	Richmond, Virginia	The Diamond
West	Tidewater Tides	Norfolk, Virginia	Harbor Park
West	Toledo Mud Hens	Toledo, Ohio	Ned Skeldon Stadium

== Attendance ==
- Charlotte Knights - 336,001
- Columbus Clippers - 541,451
- Norfolk Tides - 586,317
- Ottawa Lynx - 511,865
- Pawtucket Red Sox - 486,029
- Richmond Braves - 524,210
- Rochester Red Wings - 402,127
- Scranton/Wilkes-Barre Red Barons - 489,040
- Syracuse Chiefs - 303,208
- Toledo Mud Hens - 306,906

== Standings ==
East Division
Team	Win	Loss	%	GB
Rochester Red Wings	73	69	.514	–
Ottawa Lynx	72	70	.507	1
Pawtucket Red Sox	70	71	.496	2.5
Scranton/Wilkes-Barre Red Barons	70	72	.493	3
Syracuse Chiefs	59	82	.418	13.5

West Division
Team	Win	Loss	%	GB
Norfolk Tides	86	56	.606	–
Richmond Braves	75	66	.539	10.5
Columbus Clippers	71	68	.511	13.5
Toledo Mud Hens	71	71	.500	15
Charlotte Knights	59	81	.426	26

== Stats ==
=== Batting leaders ===
Stat	Player	Total
AVG	--	--
HR	--	--
RBI	--	--
R	--	--
H	--	--
SB	--	--

=== Pitching leaders ===
Stat	Player	Total
W	--	--
L	--	--
ERA	--	--
SO	--	--
IP	--	--
SV	--	--

== Regular season ==
=== All-Star game ===
The 1995 Triple-A All-Star Game was held at Lackawanna County Stadium, home of the IL's Scranton/Wilkes-Barre Red Barons. The All stars representing the American League affiliates won 9-0. Syracuse Chiefs third baseman Howard Battle won the top award for the International League.

== Playoffs ==
Semifinals
E1	Rochester	2
E2	Ottawa	3
W1	Norfolk	3
W2	Richmond	2

Finals
Ottawa	3
Norfolk	1

=== Division Series ===
The Ottawa Lynx won the East Division Finals over the Rochester Red Wings, 3 games to 2.

The Norfolk Tides won the West Division Finals over the Richmond Braves, 3 games to 2.

=== Championship series ===
The Ottawa Lynx won its first Governors' Cup Championship in franchise history, by beating the Norfolk Tides, 3 games to 1.
