= 1991 International League season =

The 1991 International League season took place from April to September 1991.

The Columbus Clippers defeated the Pawtucket Red Sox to win the league championship.

== Teams ==
1991 International League
Division	Team	City	Stadium
East
East	Pawtucket Red Sox	Pawtucket, Rhode Island	McCoy Stadium
East	Rochester Red Wings	Rochester, New York	Silver Stadium
East	Scranton/Wilkes-Barre Red Barons	Scranton, Pennsylvania	Lackawanna County Stadium
East	Syracuse Chiefs	Syracuse, New York	MacArthur Stadium
West
West	Columbus Clippers	Columbus, Ohio	Cooper Stadium
West	Richmond Braves	Richmond, Virginia	The Diamond
West	Tidewater Tides	Norfolk, Virginia	Met Park
West	Toledo Mud Hens	Toledo, Ohio	Ned Skeldon Stadium

== Map of teams ==
East division West division

== Attendance ==
- Columbus Clippers - 606,371
- Pawtucket Red Sox - 362,342
- Richmond Braves - 434,994
- Rochester Red Wings - 349,552
- Scranton/Wilkes-Barre Red Barons - 546,533
- Syracuse Chiefs - 307,993
- Tidewater Tides - 203,261
- Toledo Mud Hens - 229,419

== Standings ==
East Division
Team	Win	Loss	%	GB
Pawtucket Red Sox	79	64	.552	–
Rochester Red Wings	76	68	.528	3.5
Syracuse Chiefs	73	71	.507	6.5
Scranton/Wilkes-Barre Red Barons	65	78	.455	14

West Division
Team	Win	Loss	%	GB
Columbus Clippers	85	59	.590	–
Tidewater Tides	77	65	.542	7
Toledo Mud Hens	74	70	.514	11
Richmond Braves	65	79	.451	20

== Stats ==
=== Batting leaders ===
Stat	Player	Total
AVG	--	--
HR	--	--
RBI	--	--
R	--	--
H	--	--
SB	--	--

=== Pitching leaders ===
Stat	Player	Total
W	--	--
L	--	--
ERA	--	--
SO	--	--
IP	--	--
SV	--	--

== Regular season ==
=== All-Star game ===
The 1991 Triple-A All-Star Game was held at Cardinal Stadium in Louisville, Kentucky, home of the Louisville Redbirds of the American Association. The All-Stars representing the National League affiliates won 6-5. Steve Scarsone of the Scranton/Wilkes-Barre Red Barons was given the top award for the International League.
