= Skeldon =

Skeldon may refer to:

- Ned Skeldon
- Ned Skeldon Stadium
- Skeldon, Guyana
