= 1992 International League season =

The 1992 International League season took place from April to September 1992.

The Columbus Clippers defeated the Scranton/Wilkes-Barre Red Barons to win the league championship. The 1992 Clippers were recognized on The National Baseball Association's top 100 minor league teams of all-time list, placing at #72.

== Teams ==
East Division West Division

1992 International League
Division	Team	City	Stadium
East
East	Pawtucket Red Sox	Pawtucket, Rhode Island	McCoy Stadium
East	Rochester Red Wings	Rochester, New York	Silver Stadium
East	Scranton/Wilkes-Barre Red Barons	Scranton, Pennsylvania	Lackawanna County Stadium
East	Syracuse Chiefs	Syracuse, New York	MacArthur Stadium
West
West	Columbus Clippers	Columbus, Ohio	Cooper Stadium
West	Richmond Braves	Richmond, Virginia	The Diamond
West	Tidewater Tides	Norfolk, Virginia	Met Park
West	Toledo Mud Hens	Toledo, Ohio	Ned Skeldon Stadium

== Attendance ==
- Columbus Clippers - 613,416
- Norfolk Tides - 180,493
- Pawtucket Red Sox - 372,143
- Richmond Braves - 453,915
- Rochester Red Wings - 305,199
- Scranton/Wilkes-Barre Red Barons - 598,067
- Syracuse Chiefs - 277,113
- Toledo Mud Hens - 254,666

== Standings ==
East Division
Team	Win	Loss	%	GB
Scranton/Wilkes-Barre Red Barons	84	58	.592	–
Pawtucket Red Sox	71	72	.497	13.5
Rochester Red Wings	70	74	.486	15
Syracuse Chiefs	60	83	.420	24.5

West Division
Team	Win	Loss	%	GB
Columbus Clippers	95	49	.660	–
Richmond Braves	73	71	.507	22
Toledo Mud Hens	64	80	.444	31
Tidewater Tides	56	86	.394	38

== Stats ==
=== Batting leaders ===
Stat	Player	Total
AVG	Shawn Hare, Toledo	.330
HR	Hensley Meulens, Columbus	26
RBI	Hensley Meulens, Columbus	100
R	Hensley Meulens, Columbus	96
H	Gerald Williams, Columbus	156
SB	Mike Humphreys, Columbus	37

=== Pitching leaders ===
Stat	Player	Total
W	David Neid, Richmond	14(14–2)
L	Dave Telgheder, Tidewater	14(6–14)
ERA	Sam Militello, Columbus	2.29(12–2)
SO	David Neid, Richmond	159
IP	Anthony Telford, Rochester	181.0
SV	Mike Draper, Columbus	37

== Regular season ==
=== All-Star game ===
The 1992 Triple-A All-Star Game was held at The Diamond in Richmond, Virginia, home of the IL's Richmond Braves. The All-Stars representing the American League affiliates won 2–1. Sam Militello of the Columbus Clippers won the top award for the International League.
