= 1997 International League season =

The 1997 International League season took place from April to September 1997.

The Rochester Red Wings defeated the Columbus Clippers to win the league championship.

== Teams ==
East Division West Division

1997 International League
| Division | Team | City | Stadium |
East
| East | Ottawa Lynx | Ottawa, Ontario | JetForm Park |
| East | Pawtucket Red Sox | Pawtucket, Rhode Island | McCoy Stadium |
| East | Rochester Red Wings | Rochester, New York | Frontier Field |
| East | Scranton/Wilkes-Barre Red Barons | Scranton, Pennsylvania | Lackawanna County Stadium |
| East | Syracuse SkyChiefs | Syracuse, New York | P & C Stadium |
West
| West | Charlotte Knights | Charlotte, North Carolina | Knights Stadium |
| West | Columbus Clippers | Columbus, Ohio | Cooper Stadium |
| West | Richmond Braves | Richmond, Virginia | The Diamond |
| West | Tidewater Tides | Norfolk, Virginia | Harbor Park |
| West | Toledo Mud Hens | Toledo, Ohio | Ned Skeldon Stadium |

== Attendance ==
- Charlotte Knights - 322,618
- Columbus Clippers - 515,779
- Norfolk Tides - 507,328
- Ottawa Lynx - 266,568
- Pawtucket Red Sox - 480,874
- Richmond Braves - 512,727
- Rochester Red Wings - 540,842
- Scranton/Wilkes-Barre Red Barons - 441,413
- Syracuse Chiefs - 400,804
- Toledo Mud Hens - 325,532

== Standings ==
East Division
| Team | Win | Loss | % | GB |
|---|---|---|---|---|
| Rochester Red Wings | 83 | 58 | .589 | – |
| Pawtucket Red Sox | 81 | 60 | .574 | 2 |
| Scranton/Wilkes-Barre Red Barons | 66 | 76 | .465 | 17.5 |
| Syracuse SkyChiefs | 55 | 87 | .387 | 28.5 |
| Ottawa Lynx | 54 | 86 | .386 | 28.5 |

West Division
| Team | Win | Loss | % | GB |
|---|---|---|---|---|
| Columbus Clippers | 79 | 63 | .556 | – |
| Charlotte Knights | 76 | 65 | .539 | 2.5 |
| Norfolk Tides | 75 | 67 | .528 | 4 |
| Richmond Braves | 70 | 72 | .493 | 9 |
| Toledo Mud Hens | 68 | 73 | .482 | 10.5 |

== Playoffs ==
=== Division Series ===
The Rochester Red Wings won the East Division Finals over the Pawtucket Red Sox, 3 games to 1.

The Columbus Clippers won the West Division Finals over the Charlotte Knights, 3 games to 1.

=== Championship series ===
The Rochester Red Wings won the Governors' Cup Finals over the Columbus Clippers, 3 games to 2.
