= 1996 International League season =

The 1996 International League season took place from April to September 1996.

The Columbus Clippers defeated the Rochester Red Wings to win the league championship.

== Teams ==
East Division West Division

1996 International League
Division	Team	City	Stadium
East
East	Ottawa Lynx	Ottawa, Ontario	JetForm Park
East	Pawtucket Red Sox	Pawtucket, Rhode Island	McCoy Stadium
East	Rochester Red Wings	Rochester, New York	Silver Stadium
East	Scranton/Wilkes-Barre Red Barons	Scranton, Pennsylvania	Lackawanna County Stadium
East	Syracuse SkyChiefs	Syracuse, New York	MacArthur Stadium
West
West	Charlotte Knights	Charlotte, North Carolina	Knights Stadium
West	Columbus Clippers	Columbus, Ohio	Cooper Stadium
West	Richmond Braves	Richmond, Virginia	The Diamond
West	Tidewater Tides	Norfolk, Virginia	Harbor Park
West	Toledo Mud Hens	Toledo, Ohio	Ned Skeldon Stadium

== Attendance ==
- Charlotte Knights - 326,761
- Columbus Clippers - 532,468
- Norfolk Tides - 510,130
- Ottawa Lynx - 347,050
- Pawtucket Red Sox - 468,930
- Richmond Braves - 500,035
- Rochester Red Wings - 391,819
- Scranton/Wilkes-Barre Red Barons - 458,033
- Syracuse Chiefs - 300,410
- Toledo Mud Hens - 316,126

== Standings ==
East Division
Team	Win	Loss	%	GB
Pawtucket Red Sox	78	64	.549	–
Rochester Red Wings	72	69	.511	5.5
Scranton/Wilkes-Barre Red Barons	70	72	.493	8
Syracuse SkyChiefs	67	75	.472	11
Ottawa Lynx	60	82	.386	18

West Division
Team	Win	Loss	%	GB
Columbus Clippers	85	57	.599	–
Norfolk Tides	82	59	.582	2.5
Toledo Mud Hens	70	72	.493	15
Richmond Braves	62	79	.440	22.5
Charlotte Knights	62	79	.440	22.5

== Stats ==
=== Batting leaders ===
Stat	Player	Total
AVG	--	--
HR	--	--
RBI	--	--
R	--	--
H	--	--
SB	--	--

=== Pitching leaders ===
Stat	Player	Total
W	--	--
L	--	--
ERA	--	--
SO	--	--
IP	--	--
SV	--	--

== Playoffs ==
=== Division Series ===
The Rochester Red Wings won the East Division Finals over the Pawtucket Red Sox, 3 games to 1.

The Columbus Clippers won the West Division Finals over the Norfolk Tides, 3 games to none.

=== Championship series ===
The Columbus Clippers won the Governors' Cup Finals over the Rochester Red Wings, 3 games to none.
