= 2009 International League season =

- League: International League
- Sport: Baseball
- Duration: April 9 – September 7, 2009
- Games: 144
- Teams: 14

Regular season
- Season champions: Louisville Bats
- Season MVP: Shelley Duncan

Governors' Cup
- Champions: Durham Bulls (3rd)
- Runners-up: Scranton/Wilkes-Barre Yankees

IL seasons
- ← 2008 2010 →

The 2009 International League season began on Thursday, April 9, with all fourteen teams competing on opening day. The regular season ended on Monday, September 7.

In the semifinal playoff rounds, the Scranton/Wilkes-Barre Yankees defeated the Gwinnett Braves, 3-1, and the Durham Bulls defeated the Louisville Bats, 3-2. The Bulls swept the Yankees, 3-0, in the championship series to win the Governors' Cup.

== Teams ==
Division	Team	MLB Affiliation	City	Stadium	Capacity
North	Buffalo Bisons	New York Mets	Buffalo, New York	Coca-Cola Field	19,500
North	Lehigh Valley IronPigs	Philadelphia Phillies	Allentown, Pennsylvania	Coca-Cola Park	10,000
North	Pawtucket Red Sox	Boston Red Sox	Pawtucket, Rhode Island	McCoy Stadium	10,031
North	Rochester Red Wings	Minnesota Twins	Rochester, New York	Frontier Field	10,868
North	Scranton/Wilkes-Barre Yankees	New York Yankees	Moosic, Pennsylvania	PNC Field	10,310
North	Syracuse Chiefs	Washington Nationals	Syracuse, New York	Alliance Bank Stadium	11,117
South	Charlotte Knights	Chicago White Sox	Fort Mill, South Carolina	Knights Stadium	10,002
South	Durham Bulls	Tampa Bay Rays	Durham, North Carolina	Durham Bulls Athletic Park	10,000
South	Gwinnett Braves	Atlanta Braves	Lawrenceville, Georgia	Gwinnett County Ballpark	10,099
South	Norfolk Tides	Baltimore Orioles	Norfolk, Virginia	Harbor Park	12,067
West	Columbus Clippers	Cleveland Indians	Columbus, Ohio	Huntington Park	10,000
West	Indianapolis Indians	Pittsburgh Pirates	Indianapolis, Indiana	Victory Field	15,500
West	Louisville Bats	Cincinnati Reds	Louisville, Kentucky	Louisville Slugger Field	13,131
West	Toledo Mud Hens	Detroit Tigers	Toledo, Ohio	Fifth Third Field	10,300

== Before the Season ==
=== Affiliation changes ===
Before the 2009 season, three IL teams signed player development contracts (PDC) with different parent clubs.

The Columbus Clippers signed a four-year PDC with the Cleveland Indians through 2012 on September 18, 2008. The Clippers had previously been affiliated with the Washington Nationals for two years after ending their 28-year partnership with the New York Yankees. The Indians became the Clippers' third affiliate in four years.

The Syracuse Chiefs signed a two-year PDC with the Washington Nationals through 2010 on September 20, 2008. The Chiefs had previously been affiliated with the Toronto Blue Jays since 1978, and had been the only Triple-A affiliate in Toronto's history.

The Buffalo Bisons signed a two-year PDC with the New York Mets through 2010 on September 21, 2008. The Bisons had previously been affiliated with the Cleveland Indians for 14 seasons, winning three league championships (2 in the IL, 1 in the AA). The Bisons adopted a new logo and the Mets' team colors as their own to reflect the new partnership.

=== Team changes ===
After 43 seasons and 5 Governor's Cup championships, the Richmond Braves moved to Lawrenceville, Georgia becoming the Gwinnett Braves. One factor in the franchise's decision to relocate was reportedly a failure to reach an agreement on building a new ballpark in Richmond.

=== New stadiums ===
The Columbus Clippers moved from Cooper Stadium to Huntington Park in Columbus' Arena District. The stadium, which cost $56 million and seats 10,000, opened on April 18 as the Clippers hosted their rival Toledo Mud Hens. Columbus-based bank holding company Huntington Bancshares Inc. bought the stadium's naming rights for $12 million over 23 years.

The newly relocated Gwinnett Braves (formerly Richmond Braves) moved into Gwinnett Stadium in Lawrenceville, Georgia, a suburb of Atlanta. The 10,000 seat stadium is a focal point of a mixed-use entertainment district and opened on April 17 as the Braves host the Norfolk Tides.

== Regular season ==
=== Opening Day ===
April 9 was the Opening Day of the 2009 International League season. The following games were scheduled:

- Gwinnett Braves @ Charlotte Knights
- Rochester Red Wings @ Syracuse Chiefs
- Pawtucket Red Sox @ Buffalo Bisons
- Toledo Mud Hens @ Indianapolis Indians
- Columbus Clippers @ Louisville Bats
- Norfolk Tides @ Durham Bulls
- Scranton/Wilkes-Barre Yankees @ Lehigh Valley IronPigs

=== All-star game ===
The 2009 Triple-A All-Star Game was the 22nd meeting between all-stars of the International and Pacific Coast leagues, with the game taking place on July 17 at PGE Park in Portland, Oregon. For the twelfth time, the International League would field a team of its best players to compete against the host Pacific Coast League's best players. The International League would even up the All-Star Game series, with a 6-5 win over the Pacific Coast League all-stars. The PCL held a six games to five lead over the IL before the game.

== Standings ==
International League - North Division	W	L	Pct.	GB
Scranton/Wilkes-Barre Yankees	81	60	.574	—
Syracuse Chiefs	76	68	.528	6½
Lehigh Valley IronPigs	71	73	.493	11½
Rochester Red Wings	70	74	.486	12½
Pawtucket Red Sox	61	82	.427	21
Buffalo Bisons	56	87	.392	26

International League - South Division	W	L	Pct.	GB
Durham Bulls	83	61	.576	—
Gwinnett Braves	81	63	.563	2
Norfolk Tides	71	71	.500	11
Charlotte Knights	67	76	.469	15½

International League - West Division	W	L	Pct.	GB
Louisville Bats	84	58	.592	—
Toledo Mud Hens	73	70	.510	11½
Indianapolis Indians	70	73	.490	14½
Columbus Clippers	57	85	.401	27

y-division champion
x-wild card winner

== League leaders ==
=== Batting Champions ===
Stat	Player	Total
AVG	Jordan Brown	.336
Home run	Shelley Duncan	30
Run batted in	Shelley Duncan	99
Run	Shelley Duncan	85
Hit	Jesus Feliciano	154
Stolen base	Drew Stubbs	46

=== Pitching Champions ===
Stat	Player	Total
Win	Justin Lehr	13
Loss	Charlie Zink	15
Earned run average	Carlos Torres	2.39
Strikeout	Carlos Carrasco	148
Innings pitched	Wade Davis	158.2
Save	Luis Valdez	27

== Playoffs ==
The 2009 International League playoffs will take place at the conclusion of the regular season in September.

Semifinals
N	Scranton/Wilkes-Barre	3
WC	Gwinnett	1
W	Louisville	2
S	Durham	3

Governors' Cup
N	Scranton/Wilkes-Barre	0
W	Durham	3
