= 1994 International League season =

The 1994 International League season took place from April to September 1994.

The Richmond Braves defeated the Syracuse Chiefs to win the league championship.

== Teams ==
East Division West Division

1994 International League
Division	Team	City	Stadium
East
East	Ottawa Lynx	Ottawa, Ontario	JetForm Park
East	Pawtucket Red Sox	Pawtucket, Rhode Island	McCoy Stadium
East	Rochester Red Wings	Rochester, New York	Silver Stadium
East	Scranton/Wilkes-Barre Red Barons	Scranton, Pennsylvania	Lackawanna County Stadium
East	Syracuse Chiefs	Syracuse, New York	MacArthur Stadium
West
West	Charlotte Knights	Charlotte, North Carolina	Knights Stadium
West	Columbus Clippers	Columbus, Ohio	Cooper Stadium
West	Richmond Braves	Richmond, Virginia	The Diamond
West	Tidewater Tides	Norfolk, Virginia	Harbor Park
West	Toledo Mud Hens	Toledo, Ohio	Ned Skeldon Stadium

== Attendance ==
- Charlotte Knights - 404,861
- Columbus Clippers - 535,145
- Norfolk Tides - 557,586
- Ottawa Lynx - 607,190
- Pawtucket Red Sox - 477,911
- Richmond Braves - 530,200
- Rochester Red Wings - 370,050
- Scranton/Wilkes-Barre Red Barons - 476,053
- Syracuse Chiefs - 366,684
- Toledo Mud Hens - 304,827

== Standings ==
East Division
Team	Win	Loss	%	GB
Pawtucket Red Sox	78	64	.549	–
Syracuse Chiefs	71	71	.500	7
Ottawa Lynx	70	72	.493	8
Rochester Red Wings	67	74	.475	10.5
Scranton/Wilkes-Barre Red Barons	62	80	.437	16

West Division
Team	Win	Loss	%	GB
Richmond Braves	80	61	.567	–
Charlotte Knights	77	65	.542	3.5
Columbus Clippers	74	68	.521	6.5
Norfolk Tides	67	75	.472	13.5
Toledo Mud Hens	63	79	.444	17.5

== Stats ==
=== Batting leaders ===
Stat	Player	Total
AVG	--	--
HR	--	--
RBI	--	--
R	--	--
H	--	--
SB	--	--

=== Pitching leaders ===
Stat	Player	Total
W	--	--
L	--	--
ERA	--	--
SO	--	--
IP	--	--
SV	--	--

== Regular season ==
=== All-Star game ===
The 1994 Triple-A All-Star Game was held at Herschel Greer Stadium in Nashville, Tennessee, home of the American Association's Nashville Sounds. The All stars representing the National League affiliates won 8-5. Richmond Braves catcher and first baseman Luis Lopez won the top award for the International League.

== Playoffs ==
=== Division Series ===
The Syracuse Chiefs won the East Division Finals over the Pawtucket Red Sox, 3 games to 1.

The Richmond Braves won the West Division Finals over the Charlotte Knights, 3 games to 1.

=== Championship series ===
The Richmond Braves won the Governors' Cup Finals over the Syracuse Chiefs, 3 games to none.
