= 2007 International League season =

The 2007 International League season took place from April to September 2007.

The Richmond Braves defeated the Durham Bulls to win the league championship, also known as Governors' Cup Finals.

== Attendance ==
- Buffalo - 572,635
- Charlotte - 311,119
- Columbus - 507,155
- Durham - 535,056
- Indianapolis - 586,785
- Louisville - 653,915
- Norfolk - 464,034
- Ottawa - 126,894
- Pawtucket - 611,379
- Richmond - 356,028
- Rochester - 473,288
- Scranton/WB - 590,326
- Syracuse - 380,152
- Toledo - 596,675

== Standings ==
International League - North Division
Team	Win	Loss	%	GB
Scranton/Wilkes-Barre Yankees (NYY)	84	59	.587	–
Rochester Red Wings (MIN)	77	67	.535	7½
Buffalo Bisons (CLE)	75	67	.528	8½
Pawtucket Red Sox (BOS)	67	75	.472	16½
Syracuse Chiefs (TOR)	64	80	.444	20½
Ottawa Lynx (PHI)	55	88	.385	29

International League - South Division
Team	Win	Loss	%	GB
Durham Bulls (TB)	80	63	.559	–
Richmond Braves (ATL)	77	64	.546	2
Norfolk Tides (BAL)	69	73	.486	9½
Charlotte Knights (CWS)	63	80	.441	17

International League - West Division
Team	Win	Loss	%	GB
Toledo Mud Hens (DET)	82	61	.573	–
Louisville Bats (CIN)	74	70	.514	8½
Indianapolis Indians (PIT)	70	73	.535	12
Columbus Clippers (WAS)	64	80	.486	18½

== Semifinals ==
Scranton/Wilkes-Barre Yankees vs Richmond BravesRichmond won the series, 3–1.
Game	Date	Team	Score	Location
1	September 5	Scranton/Wilkes-Barre at Richmond	3–2	The Diamond
2	September 6	Scranton/Wilkes-Barre at Richmond	6–4^{(10)}	The Diamond
3	September 7	Richmond at Scranton/Wilkes-Barre	6–4	PNC Field
4	September 8	Richmond at Scranton/Wilkes-Barre	4–3	PNC Field

Durham Bulls vs Toledo Mud HensDurham won the series, 3–0.
Game	Date	Team	Score	Location
1	September 5	Toledo at Durham	11–8	Durham Bulls Athletic Park
2	September 6	Toledo at Durham	9–5	Durham Bulls Athletic Park
3	September 7	Durham at Toledo	5–2	Fifth Third Field

== Governors' Cup Finals ==
Durham Bulls vs Richmond BravesRichmond won the series, 3–2.
Game	Date	Team	Score	Location
1	September 11	Richmond at Durham	4–2	Durham Bulls Athletic Park
2	September 12	Richmond at Durham	5–1	Durham Bulls Athletic Park
3	September 13	Durham at Richmond	3–2	The Diamond
4	September 15	Durham at Richmond	6–2	The Diamond
5	September 15 (Game Two)	Durham at Richmond	7–2	The Diamond

Richmond lost to Sacramento River Cats in the Triple-A National Championship Game by the score of 7–1.

== Bracket ==
Semifinals
N1	Scranton/Wilkes-Barre Yankees	1
WC	Richmond Braves	3
S1	Durham Bulls	3
W1	Toledo Mud Hens	0

Governor's Cup Finals
WC	Richmond Braves	3
S1	Durham Bulls	2
