= Andy Marte =

Dominican baseball player (1983–2017)

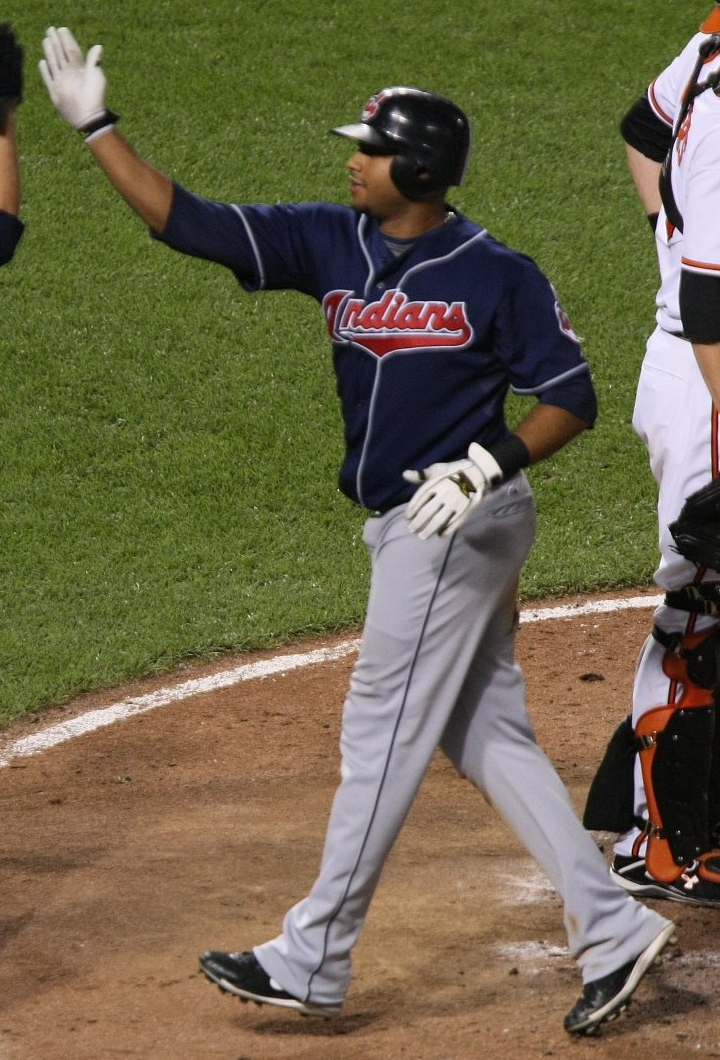
- Marte with the Cleveland Indians
- Third baseman / First baseman
- Born: October 21, 1983; Villa Tapia, Dominican Republic
- Died: January 22, 2017 (aged 33); San Francisco de Macorís, Dominican Republic
- Batted: Right Threw: Right

Professional debut
- MLB: June 7, 2005, for the Atlanta Braves
- KBO: March 28, 2015, for the KT Wiz

Last appearance
- MLB: August 6, 2014, for the Arizona Diamondbacks
- KBO: August 6, 2016, for the KT Wiz

MLB statistics
- Batting average: .218
- Home runs: 21
- Runs batted in: 99

KBO statistics
- Batting average: .312
- Home runs: 42
- Runs batted in: 163
- Stats at Baseball Reference

Teams
- Atlanta Braves (2005); Cleveland Indians (2006–2010); Arizona Diamondbacks (2014); KT Wiz (2015–2016)

Andy Manuel Marte (October 21, 1983 – January 22, 2017) was a Dominican professional baseball third baseman. He played in Major League Baseball (MLB) for the Atlanta Braves, Cleveland Indians, and Arizona Diamondbacks. He also played in the KBO League for the KT Wiz. On January 22, 2017, Marte was killed in a car crash in the Dominican Republic.

== Career ==
=== Atlanta Braves ===
Marte signed as a free agent with the Atlanta Braves at the age of 16 in 2000, and succeeded at every level of the farm system. He was selected to appear in the All-Star Futures Game in 2003 and 2004. Marte began 2005 with the Triple-A Richmond Braves. On June 6, he was recalled by Atlanta after Chipper Jones was placed on the disabled list. Marte made his major league debut the next day on June 7, finishing 0-for-3 with an RBI in Atlanta's 3–2 win. He was optioned back to Richmond on June 25. He spent three total stints at the major league level in 2005, returning to the active roster in July and September.

In 2005, Marte hit .275 with 20 home runs and 74 RBI in 109 games with Triple-A Richmond. With Atlanta, he hit only .140 with 4 RBI in 24 games. Marte was also blocked at third base by Jones, who had recently signed a contract extension.

=== Cleveland Indians ===
Marte was traded by the Atlanta Braves on December 8, 2005, to the Boston Red Sox for shortstop Édgar Rentería and cash considerations. Later that off-season, on January 27, 2006, the Red Sox traded him to the Cleveland Indians along with relief pitcher Guillermo Mota, catcher Kelly Shoppach, Randy Newsom, and cash considerations for center fielder Coco Crisp, catcher Josh Bard, and relief pitcher David Riske. While a member of Cleveland's Triple-A affiliate Buffalo Bisons in the summer of 2006, Marte was selected for the Triple-A All-Star Game played at Fifth Third Field in Toledo, Ohio, where he also won the Home Run Derby.

Marte initially received little playing time with the Indians, and split time between Cleveland and Buffalo in his first two seasons with the team. In the majors, he batted .226 with five home runs and 23 RBI in 50 games in 2006, and hit .193 with a home run and 8 RBI in 20 games in 2007.

After the Indians traded Casey Blake on July 26, 2008, it was announced that Marte would take over as the starting third baseman. He batted .221 with three home runs and 17 RBI in 80 games, and the Indians traded for Mark DeRosa after the 2008 season to play that position in 2009.

On February 19, 2009, Marte was designated for assignment by the Indians to make room for newly acquired relief pitcher Juan Salas. Marte cleared waivers and was sent outright to the Triple-A Columbus Clippers of the International League on February 25.

In 82 games for the Clippers, he batted .327 with 18 home runs and 66 RBI. Following the trade of Ryan Garko on July 27, Marte was recalled to the Indians. He spent the remainder of the season with Cleveland, batting .232 with six home runs and 25 RBI in 47 games.

On July 29, 2010, Marte made his first and only career pitching appearance, pitching a perfect inning with one strikeout of Nick Swisher. Marte hit .229 with five home runs and 19 RBI in 80 games with the Indians in 2010.

On November 5, 2010, Marte was outrighted to Triple-A Columbus, removing him from the 40-man roster, thus making him eligible to become a free agent.

=== Return to the minor leagues ===
On December 1, 2010, Marte signed a minor league deal with the Pittsburgh Pirates of Major League Baseball. He played for the Triple-A Indianapolis Indians of the International League in 2011, batting .202 with seven home runs and 37 RBI in 97 games.

Unable to find a contract, Marte sat out the 2012 season. He began the 2013 season with the York Revolution of the Atlantic League of Professional Baseball, an independent baseball league. In 96 games, Marte hit .301 with 19 home runs and 74 RBI.

Marte signed a minor league deal with the Los Angeles Angels of Anaheim on August 4, 2013. He played the remainder of the season for the Triple-A Salt Lake Bees of the Pacific Coast League. Marte continued his solid hitting prowess in Salt Lake, batting .362 with six home runs and 18 RBI in just 26 games.

=== Arizona Diamondbacks ===
Marte signed a minor league deal with the Arizona Diamondbacks on December 13, 2013. He began the 2014 season with the Triple-A Reno Aces of the Pacific Coast League.

The Diamondbacks promoted Marte to the major leagues on July 31, 2014, and hit a two-run, pinch-hit home run in his first at bat with the team off Jeff Locke of the Pittsburgh Pirates. He was designated for assignment on August 7, when the Diamondbacks promoted Jake Lamb. Marte returned to Reno and elected free agency in October 2014. He posted three hits in 16 at bats (.188 average) in six games with Arizona.

Marte's final plate appearance was a pinch-hit appearance in the ninth inning of a game on August 6, 2014, against the Kansas City Royals; Marte and the Royals' starter that day, Yordano Ventura, both died in unrelated car accidents on the same day in 2017.

=== Korean League ===
Marte spent the 2015 and 2016 seasons with the KT Wiz of the KBO League.

== Death ==
Marte was killed when his car crashed into a house, between San Francisco de Macorís and Pimentel, in the Dominican Republic on January 22, 2017. He was 33, and left behind four sons. Marte, who in the Dominican Republic was a team member of the Águilas Cibaeñas, died the same day as Yordano Ventura, who died in a separate car crash in the Dominican Republic at the age of 25.

== See also ==
- List of baseball players who died during their careers
- List of people from the Dominican Republic
