= 2002 International League season =

The 2002 International League season took place from April to September 2002.

The Durham Bulls defeated the Buffalo Bisons to win the league championship, also known as the Governor's Cup Finals.

== Attendance ==
- Buffalo - 642,272
- Charlotte - 303,321
- Columbus - 490,390
- Durham - 519,122
- Indianapolis - 571,984
- Louisville - 659,340
- Norfolk - 500,192
- Ottawa - 191,305
- Pawtucket - 615,540
- Richmond - 452,961
- Rochester - 421,494
- Scranton/W.B. - 466,342
- Syracuse - 413,566
- Toledo - 567,804

== Standings ==
International League - North Division
| Team | Win | Loss | % | GB |
|---|---|---|---|---|
| Scranton/Wilkes-Barre Red Barons (PHI) | 91 | 53 | .632 | – |
| Buffalo Bisons (CLE) | 87 | 57 | .604 | 4 |
| Ottawa Lynx (MON) | 80 | 61 | .567 | 9½ |
| Syracuse Chiefs (TOR) | 64 | 80 | .444 | 27 |
| Pawtucket Red Sox (BOS) | 60 | 84 | .417 | 31 |
| Rochester Red Wings (BAL) | 55 | 89 | .382 | 36 |

International League - South Division
| Team | Win | Loss | % | GB |
|---|---|---|---|---|
| Durham Bulls (TB) | 80 | 64 | .556 | – |
| Richmond Braves | 75 | 67 | .528 | 4 |
| Norfolk Tides (NYM) | 70 | 73 | .490 | 9½ |
| Charlotte Knights (CWS) | 55 | 88 | .385 | 24½ |

International League - West Division
| Team | Win | Loss | % | GB |
|---|---|---|---|---|
| Toledo Mud Hens (DET) | 81 | 63 | .563 | – |
| Louisville Bats (CIN) | 79 | 65 | .549 | 2 |
| Indianapolis Indians (MIL) | 67 | 76 | .469 | 13½ |
| Columbus Clippers (NYY) | 59 | 83 | .415 | 21 |

== Semifinals ==
Scranton/Wilkes-Barre Red Barons vs BuffaloBuffalo won the series, 3–0.
| Game | Date | Team | Score | Location |
|---|---|---|---|---|
| 1 | September 4 | Scranton/Wilkes-Barre at Buffalo | 12–4 | Sahlen Field |
| 2 | September 5 | Scranton/Wilkes-Barre at Buffalo | 6–5^{(10)} | Sahlen Field |
| 3 | September 6 | Buffalo at Scranton/Wilkes-Barre | 5–4 | PNC Field |

Durham Bulls vs Toledo Mud HensDurham won the series, 3–0.
| Game | Date | Team | Score | Location |
|---|---|---|---|---|
| 1 | September 4 | Durham at Toledo | 4–3 | Fifth Third Field |
| 2 | September 5 | Durham at Toledo | 8–5^{(13)} | Fifth Third Field |
| 3 | September 6 | Toledo at Durham | 4–2 | Durham Bulls Athletic Park |

== Governor's Cup Finals ==
Durham Bulls vs Buffalo BisonsDurham won the series, 3–0.
| Game | Date | Team | Score | Location |
|---|---|---|---|---|
| 1 | September 12 | Durham at Buffalo | 6–4^{(12)} | Sahlen Field |
| 2 | September 13 | Durham at Buffalo | 8–1 | Sahlen Field |
| 3 | September 14 | Buffalo at Durham | 2–0 | Durham Bulls Athletic Park |

== Bracket ==
Semifinals
N1 | Scranton/Wilkes-Barre Red Barons | 0
WC | Buffalo Bisons | 3
S1 | Durham Bulls | 3
W1 | Toledo Mud Hens | 0

Governor's Cup Finals
WC | Buffalo Bisons | 0
S1 | Durham Bulls | 3
