= Toledo Jeep Fest =

Annual automotive festival in Toledo, Ohio

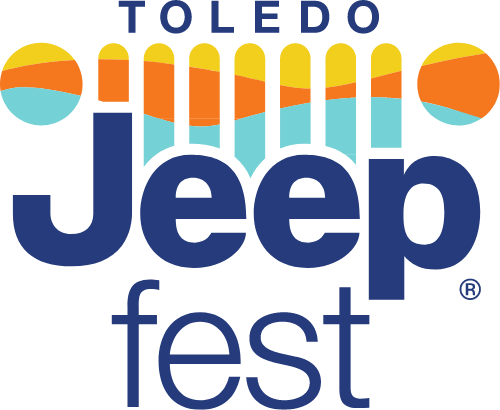
- Frequency: Annually
- Venue: Glass City Center and streets of Downtown Toledo
- Locations: Toledo, Ohio, U.S.
- Inaugurated: August 13, 2016
- Most recent: August 1–3, 2025
- Next event: August 7–9, 2026
- Attendance: 78,000 (2024)
- Sponsors: Stellantis North America; Mercy Health; UAW; Dana Incorporated

Toledo Jeep Fest is an annual festival held in Toledo, Ohio, in celebration of the Jeep brand of sport utility vehicles. The three-day event includes a street fair, a car show featuring rare and historic Jeep vehicles, and a parade of more than 1,000 Jeeps.

== History ==
The first Toledo Jeep Fest was a one-day event held on August 13, 2016, in honor of the 75th anniversary of the original Willys MB, the first "Jeep" vehicle, built in Toledo. It was organized by a group led by UAW Local 12, which represents workers at the Toledo Assembly Complex, where Jeep vehicles have been assembled since 1941. Roughly 40,000 attended the inaugural event, and over 1,000 Jeeps took part in its parade.

Following a hiatus in 2017, Toledo Jeep Fest returned as a two-day festival in August 2018. It was also held over two days in 2019, with 70,000 in attendance. A planned 2020 edition was cancelled due to the COVID-19 pandemic. Since 2021, Toledo Jeep Fest has been held over three days on either the first or second weekend of August.

== Events ==
Toledo Jeep Fest is held on the streets of Downtown Toledo, with some events taking place indoors at the Glass City Center. Most downtown streets are closed to traffic during the festival, with vendors on Jefferson, St. Clair and Summit Streets, and vehicles displayed on the other streets. A parade of Jeeps is held downtown on the Saturday morning of the festival weekend. Inside the Glass City Center, a collection of rare, vintage, and concept Jeep vehicles is displayed.

The festival has no admission charge. The 2024 edition was reportedly attended by 78,000.

During the festival weekend, the Toledo Mud Hens play at nearby Fifth Third Field under the name "Toledo Mud Crawlers" in reference to Jeep, and offer Jeep-themed promotional giveaways to game attendees.
