= Denny Harriger =

American baseball player (born 1969)

- Pitcher
- Born: July 21, 1969 (age 57); Kittanning, Pennsylvania, U.S.
- Batted: Right Threw: Right

Professional debut
- MLB: June 16, 1998, for the Detroit Tigers
- KBO: April 5, 2000, for the LG Twins

Last appearance
- MLB: June 28, 1998, for the Detroit Tigers
- KBO: October 2, 2001, for the LG Twins

MLB statistics
- Win–loss record: 0–3
- Earned run average: 6.75
- Strikeouts: 3

KBO statistics
- Win–loss record: 25–21
- Earned run average: 3.75
- Strikeouts: 266

CPBL statistics
- Win–loss record: 2–3
- Earned run average: 4.63
- Strikeouts: 19
- Stats at Baseball Reference

Teams
- Detroit Tigers (1998); LG Twins (2000–2001); Chinatrust Brothers (2004); Acereros de Monclova (2006)

Dennis Scott Harriger (born July 21, 1969) is an American former professional baseball pitcher. He played for the Detroit Tigers in Major League Baseball in 1998 and the LG Twins in the Korean Baseball Organization from 2000 to 2001.

== High school career ==
Harriger attended Ford City High School in Ford City, Pennsylvania, where he played for the school's baseball team. Between his junior and senior years, he had a .400 batting average and struck out 275 batters. He led the school to a Pennsylvania Interscholastic Athletic Association state championship in 1987, recording the win in both the semifinal and final game. He played on that team alongside Gus Frerotte, a future NFL quarterback. He was named to the Ford City Hall of Fame in 2006, and again with his state championship team the next year.

== Professional career ==
=== Minor League Baseball (1987-1998) ===
Although Harriger did not have any college baseball scholarship offers from NCAA Division I programs, he was selected by the New York Mets in the 18th round of the 1987 Major League Baseball draft. He made his professional debut on June 30, 1987, in a relief pitching appearance for the Kingsport Mets. Harriger spent six seasons pitching the Mets farm system before being granted free agency on October 15, 1993.

Harriger then signed with the San Diego Padres on November 9, 1993. Harriger then pitched for three seasons with their AAA affiliate, the Las Vegas Stars. He was then granted free agency again on October 15, 1996. Just over a month later, on November 15, Harriger signed with the Detroit Tigers AAA affiliate, the Toledo Mud Hens. He was granted free agency on October 15, 1997, and was then resigned by the Detroit Tigers on December 8 of that same year.

=== Major League Baseball (1998) ===
Harriger made his MLB debut against the Minnesota Twins on June 16, 1998. He pitched for 5.1 innings, giving up 6 hits, 3 walks, and 4 runs, all earned, that led to an 8-5 loss at Tiger Stadium (a loss credited to Harriger). He would pitch in three more games in his MLB career. His next, and final, MLB start came against the Kansas City Royals, again at home. He pitched for 4.2 innings, giving up 7 hits (including a 2-run home run to Larry Sutton), 2 walks, and 6 runs (3 earned) while striking out 2 batters. Harriger was given a loss for this game as well, his second in his career. Harriger's third major league appearance came against the Cincinnati Reds, also at Tiger Stadium. Harriger pitched the 13th inning, giving up 2 hits, 3 walks (including 2 intentional walks to Barry Larkin and Dmitri Young), and 2 runs, both earned, while getting one strikeout. The Tigers lost 6-5, and Harriger was credited with the loss. Denny Harriger's final MLB appearance came against the Cincinnati Reds the next day. He pitched the 9th inning, giving up 2 hits, 0 walks, and 0 runs in a 5-2 loss at Tiger Stadium. He was then optioned to the Mud Hens on July 14, 1998.

=== Minor League Baseball (1999) ===
Harriger was granted free agency on October 15, 1998. He played with the Indianapolis Indians in the 1999 International League season, where he had a 14–6 record and a 4.29 earned run average.

=== Korean Baseball Organization (2000-2001) ===
In 2000, in his age 30 season, Harriger moved to Korea to join the LG Twins of the KBO. He had a 3.12 era and a 17–10 record. The team went 67-63 and made it to the playoffs, but were knocked out of the playoffs by the Doosan Bears. Harriger also pitched in the 2001 season for the Twins, leading them to a 58–67 season.

=== Atlantic League, Minor League Baseball, Mexican League, and Chinese Professional Baseball League (2003-2006) ===
After not playing in the 2002 season, Harriger pitched for the Long Island Ducks of the Atlantic League in 2003. Harriger had a 3.79 era and a 5–10 record with the Ducks. In the next season, Denny Harriger joined the Chinatrust Whales of the Chinese Professional Baseball League. He pitched 46.2 innings for the whales, going 2–3. He then joined the Nashua Pride, also of the Atlantic League. He pitched 65.1 innings for the team in 2004 with a 3.31 era. He returned to the Pride in 2005, become their most used pitcher at 185.2 innings and 30 total games. This performance led him to be selected for the 2005 Atlantic League All-Star team. In the 2006 season, Harriger pitched 3 games for the Acereros de Monclova of the Mexican League. After this short stint in the Mexican League, Harriger pitched for the Lancaster Barnstormers of the Atlantic League. Denny Harriger became the ace for the Barnstormers with a 17–4 record and a 2.63 era. He ended the season top three in record, era, innings, strikeouts, and walks. He also set the Atlantic League record for wins with 17. The Barnstormers, led by Harriger's pitching, won the 2006 Atlantic League Championship.
