= 1998 International League season =

The 1998 International League season took place from April to September 1998.

The Buffalo Bisons defeated the Durham Bulls to win the league championship.

== Triple-A realignment and expansion ==
Four new teams joined the International League in 1998. Three of these teams, the Buffalo Bisons, Indianapolis Indians, and the Louisville Redbirds joined as a result of the dissolution of the American Association. All three cities had previously competed in the IL at some point in time. One team, the Durham Bulls became a Triple-A expansion team. The Bulls were previously a Class A baseball team. As a result of these moves, the IL expanded from 10 teams to 14 teams. A new division, the IL South, was also formed. The playoffs would be determined by the three division winners and one wild card winner. This would be the playoff format for the league until after the 2019 season.

== Attendance ==
- Buffalo Bisons - 768,749
- Charlotte Knights - 299,664
- Columbus Clippers - 488,674
- Durham Bulls - 491,391
- Indianapolis Indians - 659,237
- Louisville Bats - 412,398
- Norfolk Tides - 479,222
- Ottawa Lynx - 224,371
- Pawtucket Red Sox - 475,659
- Richmond Braves - 528,230
- Rochester Red Wings - 515,436
- Scranton/Wilkes-Barre Red Barons - 406,735
- Syracuse SkyChiefs - 420,488
- Toledo Mud Hens - 311,652

== Standings ==
International League - North Division
Team	Win	Loss	%	GB
Buffalo Bisons	81	62	.566	–
Syracuse SkyChiefs	80	62	.563	½
Pawtucket Red Sox	77	64	.546	3
Rochester Red Wings	70	74	.486	11.5
Ottawa Lynx	69	74	.483	12
Scranton/Wilkes-Barre Red Barons	67	75	.472	13.5

International League - South Division
Team	Win	Loss	%	GB
Durham Bulls	80	64	.556	–
Norfolk Tides	70	72	.493	9
Charlotte Knights	70	73	.490	9.5
Richmond Braves	64	80	.444	16

International League - West Division
Team	Win	Loss	%	GB
Louisville Redbirds	77	67	.535	–
Indianapolis Indians	76	67	.531	½
Columbus Clippers	67	77	.465	10
Toledo Mud Hens	52	89	.369	23.5

== Playoffs ==
=== Division Series ===
North Division Champion (Buffalo 81–62) defeated Wild Card Champion (Syracuse 80–62) 3 games to 2

South Division Champion (Durham 80–64) defeated West Division Champion (Louisville 77–67) 3 games to 1

=== Championship series ===
Buffalo defeated Durham 3 games to 2

Buffalo advanced to the first Triple-A World Series in Las Vegas, Nevada. The World Series pitted the International League Champions (Buffalo) against the Pacific Coast League Champions (New Orleans). The New Orleans Zephyrs won the Series three games to one.
