= 2006 International League season =

The 2006 International League season took place from April to September 2006.

The Toledo Mud Hens defeated the Rochester Red Wings to win the league championship, also known as the Governor's Cup Finals.

== Attendance ==
- Buffalo - 607,929
- Charlotte - 306,408
- Columbus - 518,875
- Durham - 507,547
- Indianapolis - 547,768
- Louisville - 652,692
- Norfolk - 463,769
- Ottawa - 122,574
- Pawtucket - 613,065
- Richmond - 321,696
- Rochester - 476,734
- Scranton/W.B. - 381,179
- Syracuse - 347,699
- Toledo - 606,457

== Standings ==
International League - North Division
Team	Win	Loss	%	GB
Scranton/Wilkes-Barre Red Barons (PHI)	84	58	.592	–
Rochester Red Wings (MIN)	79	64	.000	5½
Buffalo Bisons (CLE)	73	68	.518	5½
Ottawa Lynx (BAL)	74	69	.517	5½
Pawtucket Red Sox (BOS)	69	75	.479	16
Syracuse Chiefs (TOR)	64	79	.448	20½

International League - South Division
Team	Win	Loss	%	GB
Charlotte Knights (CWS)	79	62	.560	–
Durham Bulls (TB)	64	78	.451	15½
Norfolk Tides (NYM)	57	84	.404	22
Richmond Braves (ATL)	57	86	.399	23

International League - West Division
Team	Win	Loss	%	GB
Toledo Mud Hens (DET)	76	66	.535	–
Indianapolis Indians (PIT)	76	66	.535	–
Louisville Bats (CIN)	75	68	.524	1½
Columbus Clippers (NYY)	69	73	.000	7

The Toledo Mud Hens and Indianapolis Indians finish in a tie for the IL West Division they had to play a play-in game the Mud Hens win with a score of 4–0 to win the division title to clinch a spot in Governor's Cup playoffs.

== Semifinals ==
Scranton/Wilkes-Barre Red Barons vs Rochester Red WingsRochester won the series, 3–1.
Game	Date	Team	Score	Location
1	September 6	Scranton/Wilkes-Barre at Rochester	6–5	Innovative Field
2	September 7	Scranton/Wilkes-Barre at Rochester	11–5	Innovative Field
3	September 8	Rochester at Scranton/Wilkes-Barre	6–3	PNC Field
4	September 9	Rochester at Scranton/Wilkes-Barre	2–0	PNC Field

Charlotte Knights vs Toledo Mud HensToledo won the series, 3–1.
Game	Date	Team	Score	Location
1	September 6	Charlotte at Toledo	5–0	Fifth Third Field
2	September 7	Charlotte at Toledo	6–2	Fifth Third Field
3	September 8	Toledo at Charlotte	6–2	Knights Stadium
4	September 9	Toledo at Charlotte	5–2	Knights Stadium

== Governor's Cup Finals ==
Rochester Red Wings vs Toledo Mud HensToledo won the series, 3–2.
Game	Date	Team	Score	Location
1	September 12	Toledo at Rochester	6–3	Innovative Field
2	September 13	Toledo at Rochester	6–1	Innovative Field
3	September 14	Rochester at Toledo	10–4	Fifth Third Field
4	September 15	Rochester at Toledo	6–0	Fifth Third Field
5	September 16	Rochester at Toledo	10–1	Fifth Third Field

Toledo lost to Tucson Sidewinders in the first ever Triple-A National Championship Game by the score of 5–2.

== Bracket ==
Semifinals
N1	Scranton/Wilkes-Barre Red Barons	1
WC	Rochester Red Wings	3
S1	Charlotte Knights	1
W1	Toledo Mud Hens	3

Governor's Cup Finals
WC	Rochester Red Wings	2
W1	Toledo Mud Hens	3
