= 2005 International League season =

The 2005 International League season took place from April to September 2005.

The Toledo Mud Hens defeated the Indianapolis Indians to win the league championship also known as the Governors' Cup Finals.

== Attendance ==
- Buffalo - 609,092
- Charlotte - 289,409
- Columbus - 520,104
- Durham - 520,371
- Indianapolis - 565,653
- Louisville - 643,466
- Norfolk - 507,674
- Ottawa - 160,544
- Pawtucket - 688,421
- Richmond - 414,959
- Rochester - 452,302
- Scranton/W.B. - 400,726
- Syracuse - 382,625
- Toledo - 592,046

== Standings ==
International League - North Division
Team	Win	Loss	%	GB
Buffalo Bisons (CLE)	82	62	.569	–
Rochester Red Wings (MIN)	75	69	.521	7
Pawtucket Red Sox (BOS)	75	69	.521	7
Syracuse Chiefs (TOR)	71	73	.493	11
Scranton/Wilkes-Barre Red Barons (PHI)	69	75	.479	13
Ottawa Lynx (BAL)	69	75	.479	13

International League - South Division
Team	Win	Loss	%	GB
Norfolk Tides (NYM)	79	65	.549	–
Durham Bulls (TB)	65	79	.451	14
Charlotte Knights (CWS)	57	87	.396	22
Richmond Braves (ATL)	56	88	.389	23

International League - West Division
Team	Win	Loss	%	GB
Toledo Mud Hens (DET)	89	55	.618	–
Indianapolis Indians (PIT)	78	66	.542	11
Columbus Clippers (NYY)	77	67	.000	12
Louisville Bats (CIN)	66	78	.458	28

== Semifinals ==
Buffalo Bisons vs Indianapolis IndiansIndianapolis won the series, 3–2.
Game	Date	Team	Score	Location
1	September 7	Buffalo at Indianapolis	5–1	Victory Field
2	September 8	Buffalo at Indianapolis	6–5	Victory Field
3	September 9	Indianapolis at Buffalo	5–2	Sahlen Field
4	September 10	Indianapolis at Buffalo	4–1	Sahlen Field
5	September 11	Indianapolis at Buffalo	6–4	Sahlen Field

Norfolk Tides vs Toledo Mud HensToled won the series, 3–2.
Game	Date	Team	Score	Location
1	September 7	Toledo at Norfolk	6–5	Harbor Park
2	September 8	Toledo at Norfolk	7–3	Harbor Park
3	September 9	Norfolk at Toledo	4–2	Fifth Third Field
4	September 10	Norfolk at Toledo	3–2	Fifth Third Field
5	September 11	Norfolk at Toledo	5–3	Fifth Third Field

== Governors' Cup Finals ==
Indianapolis Indians vs Toledo Mud HensToledo won the series, 3–0.
Game	Date	Team	Score	Location
1	September 13	Indianapolis at Toledo	10–8	Fifth Third Field
2	September 14	Indianapolis at Toledo	6–3	Fifth Third Field
3	September 15	Toledo at Indianapolis	8–3	Victory Field

== Bracket ==
Semifinals
N1	Buffalo Bisons	2
WC	Indianapolis Indians	3
S1	Norfolk Tides	2
W1	Toledo Mud Hens	3

Governors' Cup Finals
WC	Indianapolis Indians	0
W1	Toledo Mud Hens	3
