= Ottawa Lynx =

- 1993–2007; Ottawa, Ontario

Team logo	Cap insignia

Minor league affiliations
- Class: Triple-A (1993–2007)
- League: International League (1993–2007)
- Division: North Division

Major league affiliations
- Team: Philadelphia Phillies (2007); Baltimore Orioles (2003–2006); Montreal Expos (1993–2002)

Minor league titles
- League titles (1): 1995
- Wild card berths (1): 2003

Team data
- Name: Ottawa Lynx (1993–2007)
- Ballpark: Lynx Stadium (1993–2007); JetForm Park (1993–2002)

The Ottawa Lynx were a Minor League Baseball team that competed in the Triple-A International League (IL) from 1993 to 2007. The team's home field was Lynx Stadium in Ottawa, Ontario. Over 15 seasons, the team was an affiliate of the Montreal Expos (1993–2002), Baltimore Orioles (2003–2006), and Philadelphia Phillies (2007). At the time, it was the most recent IL franchise in Canada after the Edmonton Trappers relocated to Round Rock, Texas to become the Round Rock Express in 2004.

In late August 2006, the league approved the conditions to negotiate the sale of the team. The new owners moved the team to Allentown, Pennsylvania, beginning with the 2008 season, where it became known as the Lehigh Valley IronPigs.

== History ==
In 1991, Ottawa businessman and then Ottawa 67's owner Howard Darwin was successful in applying to the IL for an expansion franchise to begin play in 1993, at a cost of $5 million. The Lynx became the second IL franchise to play in Ottawa, after the former Ottawa Giants and Ottawa Athletics of the 1950s. The application was contingent on the City of Ottawa building a baseball stadium for the team. Lynx Stadium was completed in time for the 1993 season.

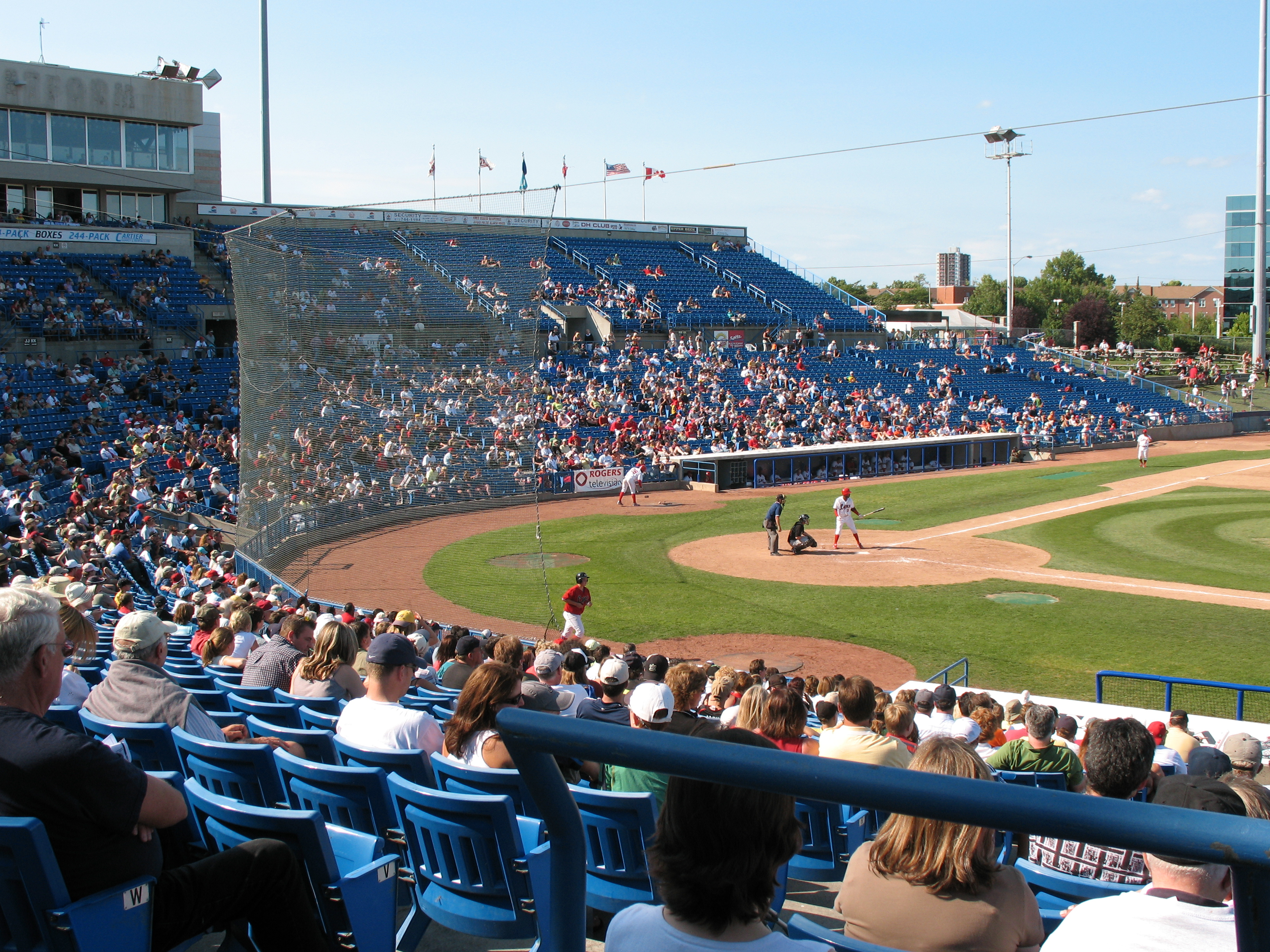
Lynx Stadium, home of the Ottawa Lynx

The Lynx began play in 1993, serving as the top farm team for the Montreal Expos. The team won the International League championship in 1995, the only time it would do so. During this period, the Lynx featured such future Major League Baseball players as Rondell White, Cliff Floyd, Matt Stairs, Kirk Rueter, and F.P. Santangelo. The Lynx eventually retired two numbers: Santangelo's 24, and Jamey Carroll's 3.

In 2000, Darwin sold his shares in the team to Ray Pecor for $7 million. According to news reports, Pecor lost $1 million annually on the team due to low attendance.

In 2003, the Lynx were not given any assurances from either the Montreal Expos or Major League Baseball on the long-term future of the Expos. They became the Triple-A affiliate of the Baltimore Orioles on September 24, 2002. As a result, Montreal shifted its affiliation to the Edmonton Trappers of the Pacific Coast League. The Lynx's working agreement with the Orioles ended when the latter signed a Player Development Contract with the Norfolk Tides on September 25, 2006.

In 2006, the ball club was sold to Joe Finley and Craig Stein, while Pecor maintained a minority stake. Finley and Stein declared their intention to move the team to Allentown, Pennsylvania, for the 2008 season, where a new stadium was set to begin construction that September (now built as Coca-Cola Park). The owners, facing a lawsuit from the City of Ottawa if they moved the Lynx, filed a lawsuit of their own against the City of Ottawa on October 17, 2006, seeking $10.75 million in damages claiming that the city failed to provide enough parking spaces, which, the team alleged, was a violation of its lease. The location far from the city centre might have contributed to the attendance problem.

The team played its last game in Ottawa on September 3, 2007, in front of a crowd of 7,461 people, losing to the Syracuse Chiefs, 8–5. The Ottawa Lynx ultimately won exactly 1,000 games before leaving Ottawa.

== Titles ==
The Lynx won the Governors' Cup, the championship of the International League, once by defeating the Norfolk Tides in 1995.

== Season-by-season records ==
Ottawa Lynx (1993–2007)
Season	Total	Finished	Playoffs
1993	73–69	.514	Lost Division series to Rochester Red Wings 3–2
1994	70–72	.493	Did not qualify
1995	72–70	.507	Won Opening Round over Rochester Red Wings 3–2; Won Governors' Cup Championship vs. Norfolk Tides 3–1
1996	60–82	.423	Did not qualify
1997	54–86	.386	Did not qualify
1998	69–74	.483	Did not qualify
1999	59–85	.410	Did not qualify
2000	53–88	.376	Did not qualify
2001	68–76	.472	Did not qualify
2002	80–61	.567	Did not qualify
2003	79–65	.549	Lost Opening Round to Pawtucket Red Sox 3–2
2004	66–78	.458	Did not qualify
2005	69–75	.479	Did not qualify
2006	74–69	.517	Did not qualify
2007	55–88	.385	Did not qualify
Regular season totals	1,001–1,138	.468	—
Postseason Totals	10–9	.526	—
Regular and Postseason Totals	1,009–1,144	.469	1 League Championship

== Alumni ==
- Matt Stairs (1993) – Outfielder/designated hitter/first baseman for Montreal, Boston, Oakland, Chicago Cubs, Milwaukee, Pittsburgh, Kansas City, Detroit, Texas, Toronto, Philadelphia, San Diego Padres, and Washington Nationals
- Rondell White (1993–94) – Outfielder/designated hitter for Montreal, Chicago Cubs, New York Yankees, San Diego, Kansas City, Detroit, and Minnesota
- Kirk Rueter (1993–1996) – Pitcher for Montreal and San Francisco
- Cliff Floyd (1993; 1996) – First baseman/outfielder/designated hitter for Montreal, Florida, Boston, New York Mets, Chicago Cubs, and Tampa Bay Rays
- F.P. Santangelo (1993–95; 1998) – Outfielder/second baseman for Montreal, San Francisco, Los Angeles Dodgers, and Oakland
- Curtis Pride (1993–95; 2001) – Outfielder/designated hitter for Montreal, Detroit, Boston, Atlanta, New York Yankees, and Anaheim/Los Angeles Angels of Anaheim
- Ugueth Urbina (1995–96) – Pitcher for Montreal, Boston, Texas, Florida, Detroit, and Philadelphia
- José Vidro (1997–98) – Second baseman/third baseman/designated hitter for Montreal/Washington and Seattle
- Orlando Cabrera (1997–98; 2000) – Gold Glove shortstop for Montreal, Boston Red Sox, Los Angeles Angels of Anaheim, Chicago White Sox, Oakland Athletics, Minnesota Twins, Cincinnati Reds, Cleveland Indians, and San Francisco Giants
- Javier Vázquez (1999) – Pitcher for Montreal, New York Yankees, Arizona, and Chicago White Sox
- Michael Barrett (2000) – Catcher for Montreal, Chicago Cubs, and San Diego
- Jamey Carroll (2000–02) – Third baseman/shortstop/second baseman for Montreal/Washington, Cleveland Indians, and Colorado
- Brandon Phillips (2002) – 2-time Gold Glove winner at second base for Cincinnati
- Rick Bauer (2003–05; 2007) – Pitcher for Baltimore and Texas
- Eli Whiteside (2005–06) – Catcher for Baltimore and San Francisco
- Adam Loewen (2006) – Baltimore Orioles pitcher and outfielder, Toronto outfielder
- Hayden Penn (2006) – Pitcher for Baltimore and Florida
- Chris Coste (2007) – Houston Astros catcher
- Zack Segovia (2007) – Philadelphia Phillies pitcher
- J. D. Durbin (2007) – Philadelphia Phillies pitcher
- Clay Condrey (2007) – Philadelphia Phillies pitcher
- Mike Zagurski (2007) – Philadelphia Phillies pitcher
- Yoel Hernández (2007) – Philadelphia Phillies pitcher
- Brian Sanches (2007) – Philadelphia Phillies pitcher
- Kane Davis (2007) – Philadelphia Phillies pitcher
- Chris Roberson (2007) – Philadelphia Phillies outfielder
- Fabio Castro (2007) – Philadelphia Phillies pitcher
- Geoff Geary (2007) – Pitcher for Philadelphia and Houston
- John Ennis (2007) – Philadelphia Phillies pitcher
- J. A. Happ (2007) – Pitcher for the Philadelphia Phillies, New York Yankees, Toronto Blue Jays, and Minnesota Twins.

== See also ==
- Ottawa Rapidz, an independent baseball team active in 2008
- Ottawa Fat Cats, a semi-professional baseball team active from 2010 to 2012
- Ottawa Champions, an independent baseball team active from 2015 to 2019
