= 2001 International League season =

The 2001 International League season took place from April to September 2001.

The Louisville Bats defeated the Scranton/Wilkes-Barre Red Barons to win the league championship, also known as the Governor's Cup Finals.

== Attendance ==
- Buffalo Bisons - 666,202
- Charlotte Knights - 370,406
- Columbus Clippers - 503,824
- Durham Bulls - 505,314
- Indianapolis Indians - 604,407
- Louisville Bats - 663,961
- Norfolk Tides - 505,074
- Ottawa Lynx - 205,916
- Pawtucket Red Sox - 647,928
- Richmond Braves - 447,020
- Rochester Red Wings - 455,123
- Scranton/Wilkes-Barre Red Barons - 458,491
- Syracuse SkyChiefs - 423,405
- Toledo Mud Hens - 300,079

== Standings ==
International League - North Division
| Team | Win | Loss | % | GB |
|---|---|---|---|---|
| Buffalo Bisons | 91 | 51 | .643 | – |
| Scranton/Wilkes-Barre Red Barons | 78 | 65 | .545 | 13½ |
| Syracuse Chiefs | 71 | 73 | .493 | 21 |
| Ottawa Lynx | 68 | 76 | .472 | 24 |
| Pawtucket Red Sox | 60 | 82 | .423 | 31 |
| Rochester Red Wings | 60 | 84 | .417 | 32 |

International League - South Division
| Team | Win | Loss | % | GB |
|---|---|---|---|---|
| Norfolk Tides | 85 | 57 | .599 | – |
| Durham Bulls | 74 | 70 | .514 | 12 |
| Richmond Braves | 68 | 76 | .472 | 18 |
| Charlotte Knights | 67 | 77 | .000 | 19 |

International League - West Division
| Team | Win | Loss | % | GB |
|---|---|---|---|---|
| Louisville Bats | 84 | 60 | .583 | – |
| Columbus Clippers | 67 | 76 | .469 | 16½ |
| Indianapolis Indians | 66 | 78 | .458 | 18 |
| Toledo Mud Hens | 65 | 79 | .451 | 19 |

== Semifinals ==
| Date | Team | Score |
|---|---|---|
| September 5 | Buffalo at Scranton/Wilkes-Barre | 7–3 |
| September 6 | Buffalo at Scranton/Wilkes-Barre | 3–2 |
| September 7 | Scranton/Wilkes-Barre at Buffalo | 9–1 |
| September 8 | Scranton/Wilkes-Barre at Buffalo | 4–3 |
| September 9 | Scranton/Wilkes-Barre at Buffalo | 6–2^{(19)} |

| Date | Team | Score |
|---|---|---|
| September 5 | Louisville at Norfolk | 5–2 |
| September 6 | Louisville at Norfolk | 4–0 |
| September 7 | Norfolk at Louisville | 1–0 |
| September 8 | Norfolk at Louisville | 7–1 |
| September 9 | Norfolk at Louisville | 2–0 |

== Governor's Cup Finals ==
| Date | Team | Score |
|---|---|---|
| September 10 | Scranton/Wilkes-Barre at Louisville | 2–1 |
| September 11 | Canceled due to September 11 attacks | – |
| September 12 | Canceled due to September 11 attacks | – |

== Bracket ==
Semifinals
N1 | Buffalo Bisons | 2
WC | Scranton/Wilkes-Barre Red Barons | 3
S1 | Norfolk Tides | 2
W1 | Louisville RiverBats | 3

Governor's Cup Finals
WC | Scranton/Wilkes-Barre Red Barons | 0
W1 | Louisville RiverBats | 1
