= 2000 International League season =

The 2000 International League season took place from April to September 2000.

The Indianapolis Indians defeated the Scranton/Wilkes-Barre Red Barons to win the league championship.

== Attendance ==
- Buffalo Bisons - 678,356
- Charlotte Knights - 338,928
- Columbus Clippers - 458,806
- Durham Bulls - 483,843
- Indianapolis Indians - 672,209
- Louisville Bats - 685,863
- Norfolk Tides - 479,741
- Ottawa Lynx - 135,683
- Pawtucket Red Sox - 585,107
- Richmond Braves - 451,479
- Rochester Red Wings - 459,494
- Scranton/Wilkes-Barre Red Barons - 470,974
- Syracuse Chiefs - 402,450
- Toledo Mud Hens - 298,564

== Standings ==
International League - North Division
Team	Win	Loss	%	GB
Buffalo Bisons	86	59	.593	–
Scranton/Wilkes-Barre Red Barons	85	60	.586	1
Pawtucket Red Sox	82	61	.573	3
Syracuse SkyChiefs	74	66	.529	9.5
Rochester Red Wings	65	79	.451	20.5
Ottawa Lynx	53	88	.376	31

International League - South Division
Team	Win	Loss	%	GB
Durham Bulls	81	62	.566	–
Charlotte Knights	78	65	.545	3
Norfolk Tides	65	79	.451	16.5
Richmond Braves	51	92	.357	30

International League - West Division
Team	Win	Loss	%	GB
Indianapolis Indians	81	63	.563	–
Columbus Clippers	75	69	.521	6
Louisville RiverBats	71	73	.493	10
Toledo Mud Hens	55	86	.390	24.5

== Playoffs ==
=== Division series ===
North Division Champion Buffalo (86-59) faced Wild Card winner, Scranton (85-60). Winner: Scranton

South Division Champion Durham (81-62) faced West Division Champion Indianapolis (81-63). Winner: Indianapolis

=== Championship series ===
The Indianapolis Indians defeated the Scranton Wilkes-Barre Red Barons.

Indianapolis faced the Memphis Redbirds from the Pacific Coast League in the Triple-A World Series.

Indianapolis won the series 3 games to one. This would be the last World Series held until 2006 when the two leagues agreed on a one game playoff to determine the Triple A Champion.
