= 2003 International League season =

The 2003 International League season took place from April to September 2003.

The Durham Bulls defeated the Pawtucket Red Sox to win the league championship.

== Attendance ==
- Buffalo - 551,916
- Charlotte - 268,374
- Columbus - 480,445
- Durham - 501,855
- Indianapolis - 550,319
- Louisville - 661,986
- Norfolk - 480,963
- Ottawa - 182,852
- Pawtucket - 569,106
- Richmond - 446,882
- Rochester - 418,014
- Scranton/W.B. - 427,445
- Syracuse - 356,303
- Toledo - 517,331

== Standings ==
International League - North Division
Team	Win	Loss	%	GB
Buffalo Bisons	0	0	.000	–
Ottawa Lynx	0	0	.000	-
Pawtucket Red Sox	0	0	.000	-
Rochester Red Wings	0	0	.000	-
Scranton/Wilkes-Barre Yankees	0	0	.000	-
Syracuse Chiefs	0	0	.000	-

International League - South Division
Team	Win	Loss	%	GB
Charlotte Knights	0	0	.000	–
Durham Bulls	0	0	.000	-
Richmond Braves	0	0	.000	-
Norfolk Tides	0	0	.000	-

International League - West Division
Team	Win	Loss	%	GB
Columbus Clippers	0	0	.000	–
Indianapolis Indians	0	0	.000	-
Louisville Bats	0	0	.000	-
Toledo Mud Hens	0	0	.000	-

== Stats ==
=== Batting leaders ===
Stat	Player	Total
AVG	--	--
HR	--	--
RBI	--	--
R	--	--
H	--	--
SB	--	--

=== Pitching leaders ===
Stat	Player	Total
W	--	--
L	--	--
ERA	--	--
SO	--	--
IP	--	--
SV	--	--

== Playoffs ==
=== Division Series ===
North Division (Pawtucket) IL Wild Card (Ottawa Lynx)

Winner: Pawtucket

South Division (Durham) West Division (Louisville)

Winner: Durham

=== Championship series ===
Pawtucket Red Sox

Durham Bulls

Winner: Durham Bulls; first team to win back to back IL titles since Columbus Clippers won back in 1991.
