= 1999 International League season =

The 1999 International League season took place from April to September 1999.

The Charlotte Knights defeated the Durham Bulls to win the league championship.

== Attendance ==
- Buffalo Bisons - 684,051
- Charlotte Knights - 353,303
- Columbus Clippers - 463,874
- Durham Bulls - 474,494
- Indianapolis Indians - 658,250
- Louisville Bats - 361,419
- Norfolk Tides - 486,727
- Ottawa Lynx - 195,979
- Pawtucket Red Sox - 596,624
- Richmond Braves - 523,670
- Rochester Red Wings - 481,039
- Scranton/Wilkes-Barre Red Barons - 458,122
- Syracuse SkyChiefs - 446,025
- Toledo Mud Hens - 295,173

== Standings ==
International League - North Division
| Team | Win | Loss | % | GB |
|---|---|---|---|---|
| Scranton/Wilkes-Barre Red Barons | 78 | 66 | .542 | – |
| Pawtucket Red Sox | 76 | 68 | .528 | 2 |
| Syracuse SkyChiefs | 73 | 71 | .507 | 5 |
| Buffalo Bisons | 72 | 72 | .500 | 6 |
| Rochester Red Wings | 61 | 83 | .424 | 17 |
| Ottawa Lynx | 59 | 85 | .410 | 19 |

International League - South Division
| Team | Win | Loss | % | GB |
|---|---|---|---|---|
| Durham Bulls | 83 | 60 | .580 | – |
| Charlotte Knights | 82 | 62 | .000 | 1.5 |
| Norfolk Tides | 77 | 63 | .550 | 4.5 |
| Richmond Braves | 64 | 78 | .451 | 18.5 |

International League - West Division
| Team | Win | Loss | % | GB |
|---|---|---|---|---|
| Columbus Clippers | 83 | 58 | .589 | – |
| Indianapolis Indians | 75 | 69 | .521 | 9.5 |
| Louisville Bats | 63 | 81 | .438 | 21.5 |
| Toledo Mud Hens | 57 | 87 | .396 | 27.5 |

== Playoffs ==
=== Division series ===
The North Division Scranton Red Barons (78-66) faced the IL Wild Card the Charlotte Knights (82-62). Charlotte defeated Scranton.

The South Division Champion Durham Bulls (83-60) faced the West Division Champion Columbus Clippers (83-58). Durham defeated Columbus.

=== Championship series ===
Charlotte defeated Durham 3 games to 1.

Charlotte faced the PCL Champions the (Vancouver Canadians) from the Pacific Coast League in the Triple-A World Series. Vancouver won the Series 3 games to 2.
