= 2008 International League season =

The 2008 International League season was the 125th season of the Triple-A International League. It took place between April and September 2008.

In the semifinal playoff rounds, the Scranton/Wilkes-Barre Yankees defeated the Pawtucket Red Sox 3-1 and the Durham Bulls defeated the Louisville Bats 3-1. The Scranton/Wilkes-Barre Yankees defeated the Durham Bulls 3-1 in the championship series to win the Governors' Cup.

== Attendance ==
Rk	Team	MLB Parent	Attendance
1	Pawtucket Red Sox	Boston Red Sox	643,049
2	Louisville Bats	Cincinnati Reds	638,777
3	Indianapolis Indians	Pittsburgh Pirates	606,166
4	Lehigh Valley IronPigs	Philadelphia Phillies	602,033
5	Buffalo Bisons	Cleveland Indians	590,386
6	Toledo Mud Hens	Detroit Tigers	584,596
7	Columbus Clippers	Washington Nationals	537,889
8	Durham Bulls	Tampa Bay Rays	514,281
9	Scranton/Wilkes-Barre Yankees	New York Yankees	496,658
10	Rochester Red Wings	Minnesota Twins	490,806
11	Norfolk Tides	Baltimore Orioles	433,767
12	Syracuse Chiefs	Toronto Blue Jays	392,028
13	Charlotte Knights	Chicago White Sox	312,290
14	Richmond Braves	Atlanta Braves	289,570
	Season Total		7,132,296

== Final regular season standings ==
=== North Division ===
North Division	W	L	Pct.	GB
Scranton/Wilkes-Barre Yankees	88	56	.611	—
Pawtucket Red Sox	85	58	.594	2½
Rochester Red Wings	74	70	.514	14
Syracuse Chiefs	69	73	.486	18
Buffalo Bisons	66	77	.462	21½
Lehigh Valley IronPigs	55	89	.382	33

Pawtucket clinched the wild card berth.

=== South Division ===
South Division	W	L	Pct.	GB
Durham Bulls	74	70	.514	—
Norfolk Tides	64	78	.451	9
Charlotte Knights	63	78	.447	9½
Richmond Braves	63	78	.447	9½

=== West Division ===
West Division	W	L	Pct.	GB
Louisville Bats	88	56	.611	—
Toledo Mud Hens	75	69	.521	13
Columbus Clippers	69	73	.486	18
Indianapolis Indians	68	76	.472	20

== Playoffs ==
The following teams qualified for the postseason: Durham Bulls, Louisville Bats, Pawtucket Red Sox, and Scranton/Wilkes-Barre Yankees.

1st Round
1	Scranton/Wilkes-Barre Yankees	3
4	Pawtucket Red Sox	1
3	Durham Bulls	3
2	Louisville Bats	1

Governors' Cup
Scranton/Wilkes-Barre Yankees	3
Durham Bulls	1

Scranton played in the Triple A Championship Game but lost to the defending champions, the Sacramento River Cats. This marks the first time a defending champion successfully defended its title.
