= Ned Skeldon =

American politician (died 1988)

- Born: Edward T. Skeldon
- Died: 1988
- Occupation: politician
- Known for: promotion of baseball in Toledo, Ohio

Edward J. "Ned" Skeldon was a Toledo local politician remembered for his promotion of baseball in the fourth most populous city in the U.S. state of Ohio.

== Biography ==
=== Politics ===
Ned Skeldon was a longtime advocate for Toledo and Northwest Ohio. A life long resident of the area who attended Central Catholic High School, save military service and working for Toledo interests in Washington D.C. Skeldon entered local politics by winning the vice mayor position and later served four terms as the county commissioner. Skeldon also fought to clean up the Maumee River, heading the Clear Water Inc. and serving as vice chairman of Ohio Water Development Authority, groups advocating environmental cleanup of the Maumee River and Northwest Ohio.

=== Baseball ===
For nine years, 1956 through 1964, Toledo was without a minor league baseball franchise, the longest such period in the then seventy year history of Toledo baseball. One man was determined to end that drought as soon as possible, Edward T. "Ned" Skeldon. In the early 1960s, Skeldon proposed that the racetrack at the county fairgrounds be converted into a baseball park and set out to build a committee that would help him to accomplish it. The committee that was created to bring baseball back to Toledo was made up of area businessmen and civic leaders. The group included Toledo Trust's president Henry Morse and his vice Steve Stranahan, Monsignor Jerome Schmit of St. Patrick's Church (Secretary-Treasurer), and Ray Johnston (General Manager).

After the reconstruction of the park, Skeldon was able to bring the Triple-A franchise from Richmond, Virginia to Toledo, along with an affiliation with the New York Yankees. Toledo was given another shot at minor league baseball, resuscitating the Toledo Mud Hens moniker, and field a team for the 1965 International League season at the new Lucas County Stadium. Skeldon continued to have a working relationship with the team. The stadium was eventually renamed Ned Skeldon Stadium in 1988 in his honor. Edward T. "Ned" Skeldon died just three months after the stadium dedication.
