= Ben Hendrickson =

American baseball player (born 1981)

- Pitcher
- Born: February 4, 1981 (age 45); St. Cloud, Minnesota, U.S.
- Batted: Right Threw: Right

MLB debut
- June 2, 2004, for the Milwaukee Brewers

Last MLB appearance
- May 20, 2006, for the Milwaukee Brewers

MLB statistics
- Win–loss record: 1–10
- Earned run average: 7.41
- Strikeouts: 37
- Stats at Baseball Reference

Teams
- Milwaukee Brewers (2004, 2006)

Benjamin John Hendrickson (born February 4, 1981) is an American former baseball pitcher.

== Early life and career ==
Hendrickson was born in St. Cloud, Minnesota, and originally signed with the Milwaukee Brewers in the tenth round of the 1999 First-Year Player Draft. He made his major league debut with the Brewers in 2004, going only 1–8 with a 6.22 earned run average the same season he was named the International League's Most Valuable Player after going 11–3 with a 2.02 ERA and 93 strike outs in 21 starts for the Indianapolis Indians.

Hendrickson spent all of 2005 with the Brewers' triple A affiliate, the Nashville Sounds, but was once again a major leaguer for 2006. He struggled in his major league starts in early 2006, twice struggling to get out of the first inning. He was reassigned to Triple-A Nashville on May 21, 2006, after a dismal start against the Twins in which he allowed six runs on five hits and a walk without recording an out. He was the 14th pitcher in Brewers history to fail to record an out in a start and the first since Jamie McAndrew on August 28, 1995. He went 9–8 with Nashville, and was named a Pacific Coast League All-Star. He has a career major league ERA of 6.48 and has played in 13 games in his career, 10 in 2004 and 3 in 2006. Hendrickson also has 58 innings pitched.

During Spring training 2007, Hendrickson was waived in order for Milwaukee to remove him from their 40-man roster. After clearing waivers, he was again assigned to Nashville, at which point he requested the team trade him. On March 27, Hendrickson was traded to the Kansas City Royals in exchange for catcher Max St. Pierre. After being released by the Royals during 2008 Spring training, Hendrickson signed a minor league contract with the Tampa Bay Rays and became a free agent at the end of the season. In February 2009, he signed a minor league contract with the Minnesota Twins. On June 23, 2009, Hendrickson was released by the Minnesota Twins.

== Personal life ==
In October 2018, Hendrickson was charged with cheating a post-baseball employer out of roughly $250,000 while working as its accountant, according to charges. While working for Floors Northwest in Fridley, MN, Hendrickson would alter the amount of cash received to make it look like less was collected from sales staff. Hendrickson deposited the lower amount and kept the rest. Nearly $160,000 of the money he stole was taken in the final two years of his employment. He also shifted $10,000 of the company's money to a personal health care account that paid his medical bills. Hendrickson admitted to police that he stole from the company, but thought the total was between $50,000 and $75,000. He said he took the money "to help pay bills as he was working paycheck to paycheck and not getting ahead."
