= Fifth Third Field (Toledo, Ohio) =

Home venue of the Toledo Mud Hens

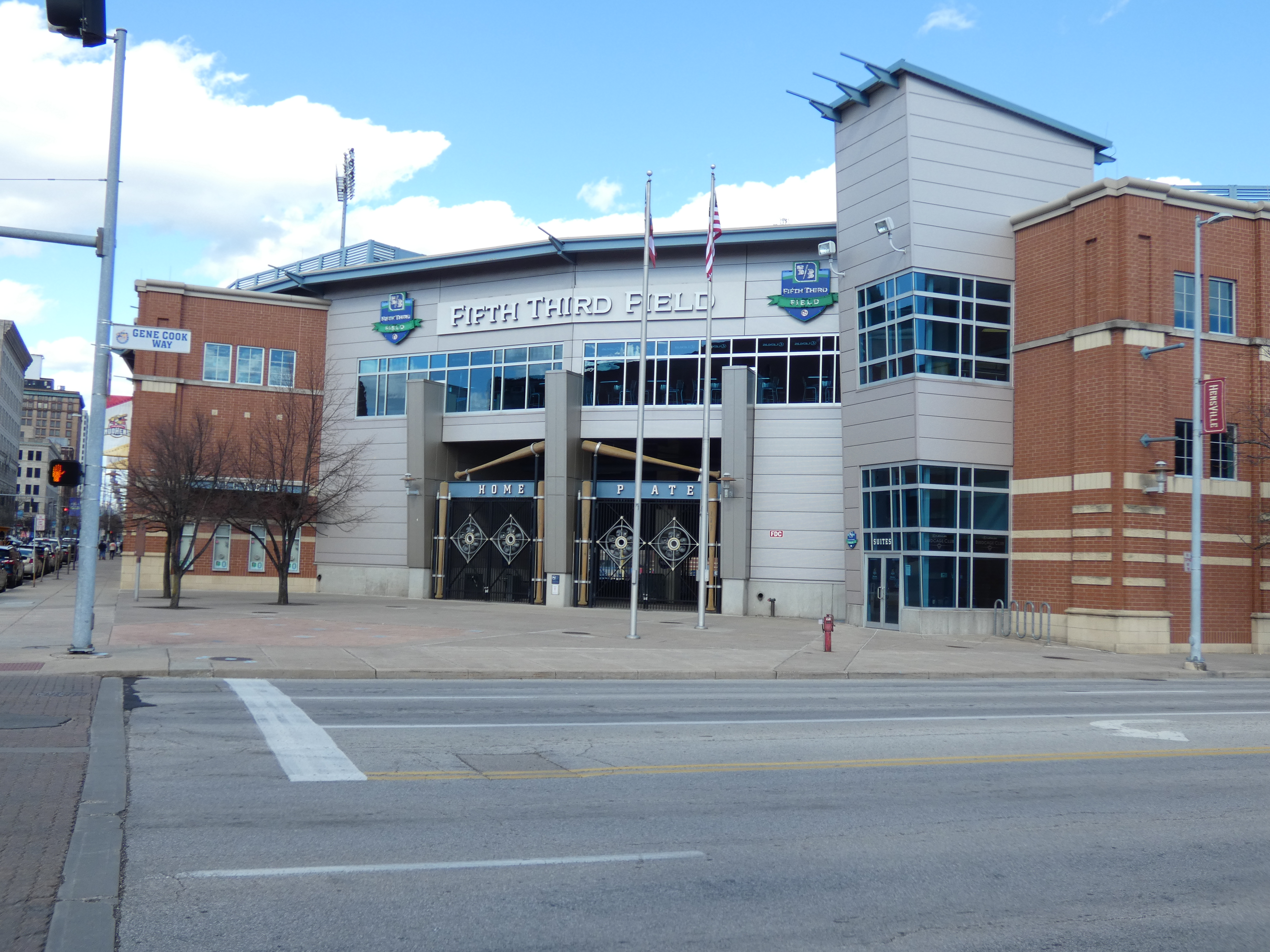

- Location within Ohio Location within the United States
- Location: 406 Washington Street; Toledo, Ohio; United States
- Coordinates: 41°38′54″N 83°32′20″W
- Owner: Lucas County
- Operator: Toledo Mud Hens Baseball Club, Inc.
- Capacity: 10,300 (8,943 fixed seats)
- Surface: Natural Grass
- Field size: Left field: 320 ft (98 m); Center field: 400 ft (120 m); Right field: 320 ft (98 m)

Construction
- Groundbreaking: October 20, 2000
- Opened: April 9, 2002
- Cost: $39.2 million ($70.2 million in 2025 dollars)
- Architects: HNTB; The Collaborative Inc. Finkbeiner, Pettis & Strout Inc.
- Project manager: The Gateway Group
- Services engineers: H. T. Bernsdorff, Inc
- General contractor: Lathrop Construction Associates, Inc.

Tenant
- Toledo Mud Hens (IL) 2002–present

Fifth Third Field is a Minor League Baseball stadium in Toledo, Ohio, United States. The facility is home to the Toledo Mud Hens, an International League team and the Triple-A affiliate of the Detroit Tigers.

The stadium seats 10,300 and opened in 2002. The stadium was named one of the best minor league ballparks in America by Newsweek. In the summer of 2007, ESPN.com rated The Roost section of Fifth Third Field as the best seats to watch a game in minor league baseball.

The Ohio-based Fifth Third Bank purchased the naming rights to the baseball stadium.

== Location ==
It is located in downtown Toledo, two blocks from the Maumee River. The new stadium replaced Ned Skeldon Stadium, located in suburban Maumee, as the Mud Hens' home. Ned Skeldon Stadium was described as "quaint" or "rustic" and the new park was intended to boost development downtown. A small commercial area has sprung up around the park, centered on St. Clair Street, on the park's southeast side.

The street address is 406 Washington Street. The park is bounded by Washington Street/Gene Cook Way (southwest, first base side), North Huron Street/Ned Skeldon Way (northwest, third base side), Monroe Street/Henry Morse Way (northeast, left field side) and North Saint Clair Street (southeast, right field side).

The Fifth Third Field is part of a complex that includes the SeaGate Convention Centre and the Huntington Center (formerly known as the Lucas County Arena). The Lucas County Commissioners teamed with HNTB Architecture Inc., a national sports architecture firm located in Kansas City and local architects and landscape architects The Collaborative Inc, of Toledo to design the Mud Hens Stadium. Following nearly two years of planning, the Stadium, with assistance from the City of Toledo and Lucas County, embarked upon an entertainment district expansion creating the district known as Hensville. The $21 million expansion is expected to draw 150,000–200,000 more people to Toledo's downtown. The entertainment district stretches along North St. Clair Street from Washington to Monroe streets, adjacent to the ballpark. The area includes the expanded Swamp Shop, new retail shop Holy Toledo, several rooftop bars, Nine restaurant, Fleetwood's Tap Room, and Hensville Park. In addition to increased traffic for ballgames, the district will also hold events such as outdoor concerts, Monday movie nights, fireworks and other unique weekly events.

== Features ==
- Fixed seats: 8,943
- Picnic seats: 776
- Handicap seats: 86
- Seats in the "Roost": 282
- Club Level seats: 1,200
- Suites: 32

The ballpark's largest crowd occurred on July 29, 2017, when 13,406 fans saw the Hens play the Rochester Red Wings The Mud Hens won 6–5.

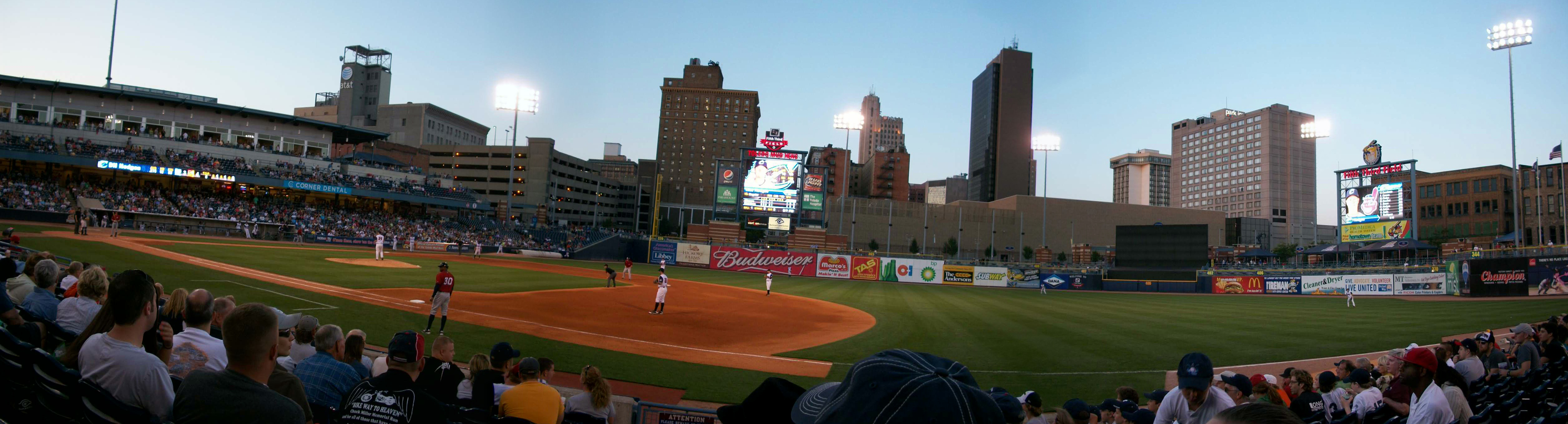
The view of Fifth Third Field from right field on August 25th 2010

== Scoreboards ==
In 2009, the Mud Hens installed new ribbon scoreboards along the first base and third base sides of the ballpark. They are in color and can display a variety of graphics, stats, and the game score. Also, the Mud Hens replaced their Fair Play Scoreboards scoreboard and Barco video board with a Daktronics video board display in left field which is in color and is a complete matrix board that shows the line score of the game. It is also zoned on the top 70% where it shows the current batter, animations, games, and replays. The new Daktronics video board also replaced the Fair Play message board below the old Fair Play scoreboard.

In 2019, the Mud Hens, along with Daktronics installed a brand new 2,500-square-foot LED video display and two new ribbon scoreboards. The main video display is measured at 37 ft (11.28 m) high by 68.5 ft (20.88 m) wide. The main display, like the previous one, can show game score, live video, replays, current batter, graphics, and sponsored messages. The ribbon scoreboards are measured at around 3.5 ft (1.07 m) high by 157 ft (47.85 m) long. Similar to the main display, these scoreboards are capable of showing supplemental information such as the current batter, statistics, game score, graphics, and sponsored messages. Both video displays feature a 15HD pixel layout for high image clarity and contrast.

== First game ==
On April 9, 2002, Fifth Third Field hosted its first game as the Toledo Mud Hens faced off against the Norfolk Tides. The Mud Hens had a 2–0 lead going to the top of the fourth. The Tides scored five runs to take a 5–2 lead over the Mud Hens. Then the Mud Hens answered back scoring five unanswered runs to win 7–5.

== Triple-A All-Star Week ==
Fifth Third Field hosted the 2006 Triple-A All-Star Game, which was played on July 12 and broadcast on ESPN2, and the Triple-A Home Run Derby, which was contested on July 10. All-Star Week festivities also included the All-Star FanFest at the Seagate Centre leading up to the game with activities for all ages.

=== Triple-A All-Star Game ===
	1	2	3	4	5	6	7	8	9	R	H	E
Pacific Coast League	0	0	0	0	0	0	0	0	0	0	2	1
International League	0	0	3	0	1	0	2	0	X	6	9	0
- Date: July 12, 2006
- Managers: Mike Jirschele (OMA); Larry Parrish (TOL)
- TV announcers: Jon Sciambi (play-by-play), Buck Martinez (analyst), and Duke Castiglione (reporter)

The International League All-Stars defeated the Pacific Coast League All-Stars, 6–0. Heath Phillips was the winning pitcher from the Charlotte Knights, and Ben Hendrickson was the losing pitcher from the Nashville Sounds. The game's attendance was a standing-room only crowd of 11,300 people.

=== Triple-A Home Run Derby ===
Andy Marte from International League's Buffalo Bisons won the Home Run Derby by defeating Ryan Ludwick from the IL's Toledo Mud Hens in the final round. Marte hit a total of 29 home runs during the three-round event.

Ranking	Player	Team
1st	Andy Marte	Buffalo Bisons (IL)
2nd	Ryan Ludwick	Toledo Mud Hens (IL)
3rd	Kevin Witt	Durham Bulls (IL)
4th	Nelson Cruz	Nashville Sounds (PCL)
5th	Justin Leone	Portland Beavers (PCL)
6th	Luke Scott	Round Rock Express (PCL)

Events and tenants
Preceded by Ned Skeldon Stadium	Home of the Toledo Mud Hens; 2002–present	Succeeded by current
Preceded by Raley Field	Site of the Triple-A All-Star Game; 2006	Succeeded by Isotopes Park
