= Ned Skeldon Stadium =

Sports stadium in Maumee, Ohio, United States

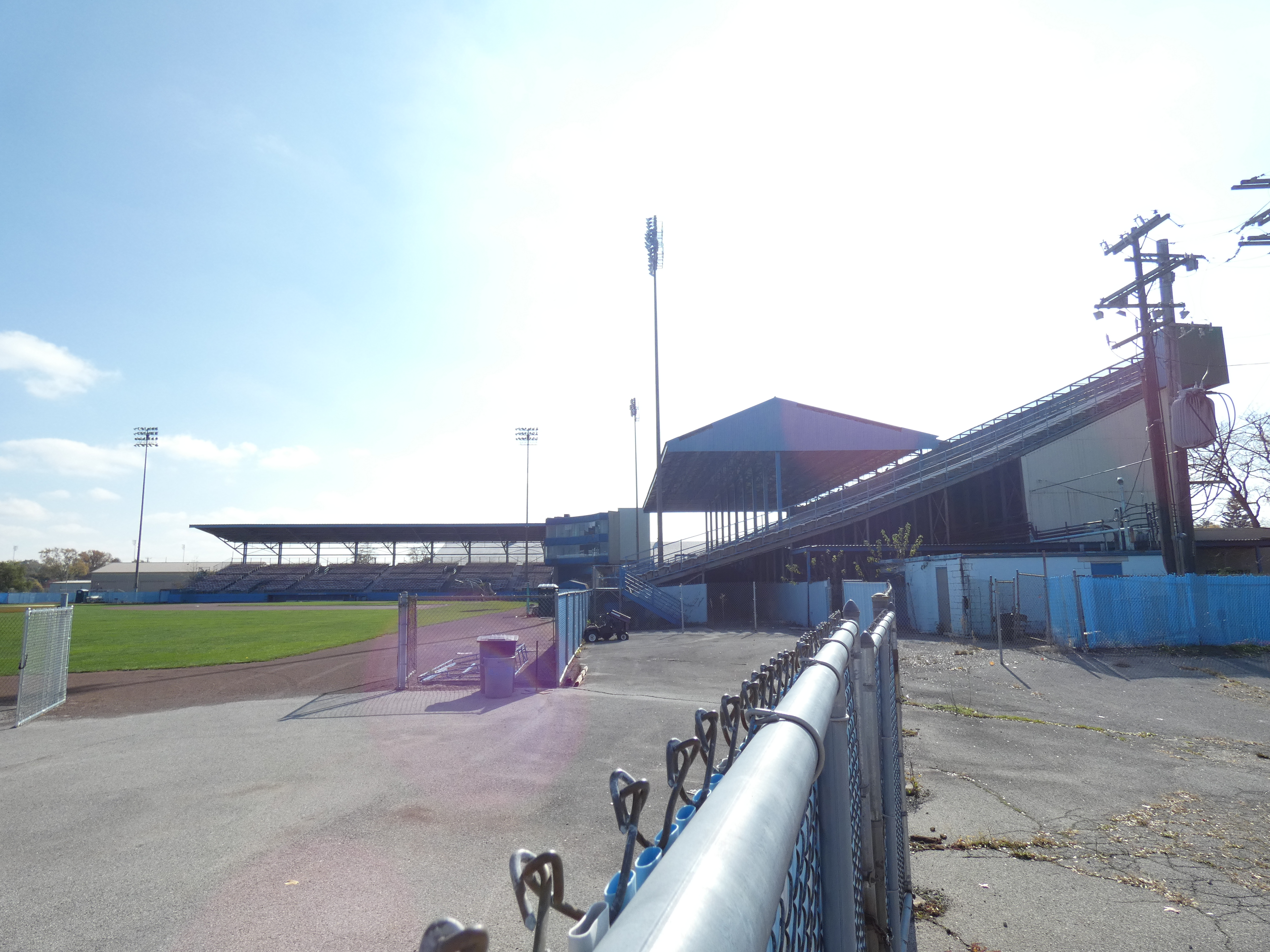
- Stadium in 2019
- Interactive map of Ned Skeldon Stadium
- Former names: Lucas County Stadium
- Location: 2901 Key Street Maumee, Ohio 43537
- Coordinates: 41.58456°N 83.644203°W
- Owner: Lucas County
- Capacity: 10,025
- Field size: Left field: 325 ft Center field: 410 ft Right field: 325 ft

Construction
- Opened: 1965
- Closed: 2022

Tenant
- Toledo Mud Hens (IL) (1965–2002)

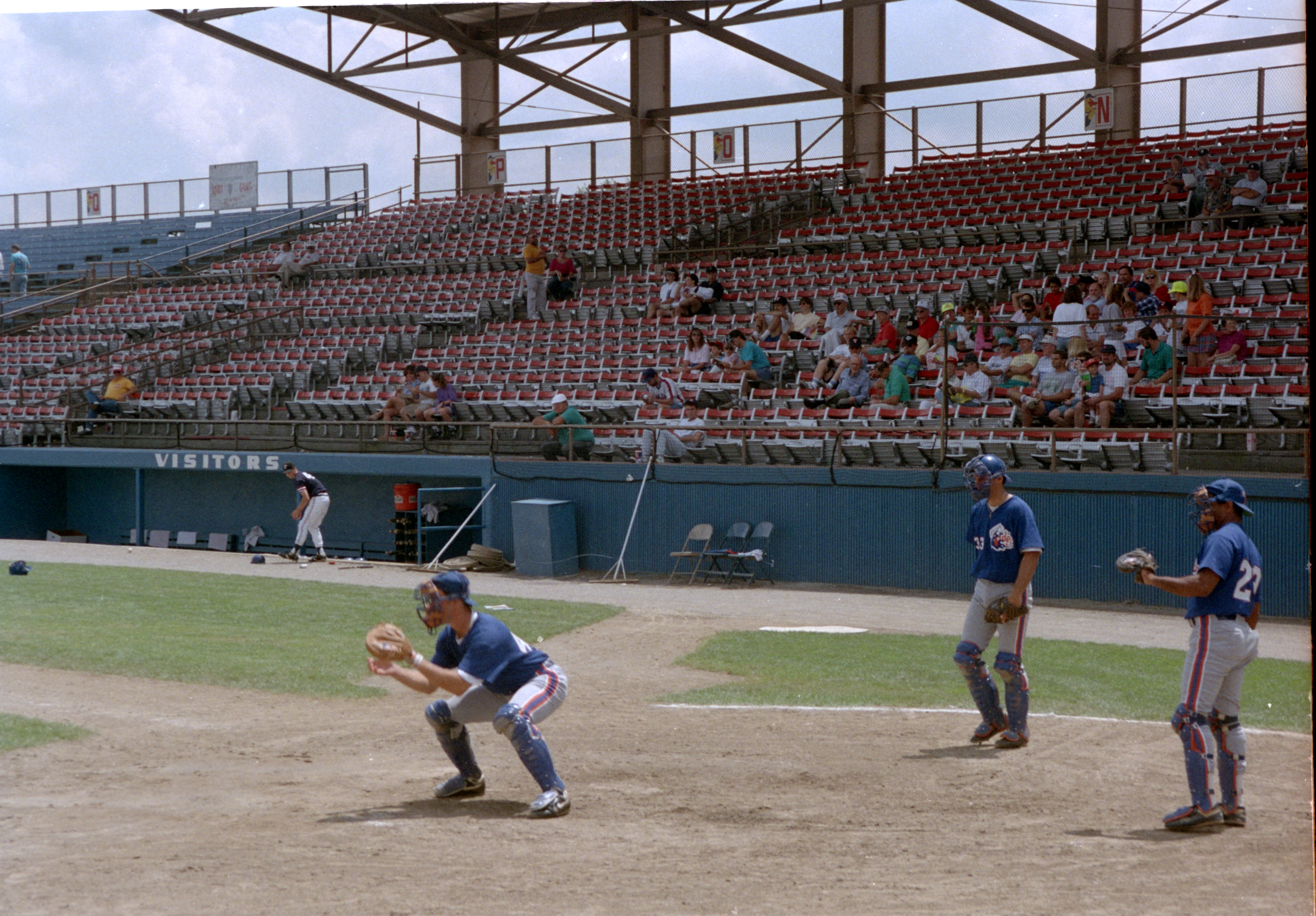
Game at the stadium in 1992

Ned Skeldon Stadium, originally opened as Lucas County Stadium, was a baseball stadium in Maumee, Ohio. It was primarily used for baseball, and was the home field of the Toledo Mud Hens minor league baseball team. It opened for minor league ball in 1965, and closed for the minors in 2002 when the Mud Hens moved to Fifth Third Field. It held 10,197 people. The stadium replaced Swayne Field, which had been demolished after the previous version of the Mud Hens had folded ten years earlier.

Prior to 1965, the ballpark was the racetrack of the Lucas County fairgrounds, a.k.a. Fort Miami Fairgrounds, as far back as 1902. Public official Ned Skeldon persuaded area businessmen to sponsor conversion of the stadium for use as a ballpark, for the purpose of reviving the Mud Hens. The racetrack stands were converted into the third-base stands, and additional seating was constructed around the home plate and first base sides, also suites were added that were called "The Diamond Club". The whole area was redeveloped as the Lucas County Recreation Center.

The scoreboard at "The Ned" was an old Fair Play Scoreboards model with a small four line message board along the bottom in monochrome that would run small (under 20 frame) animations and text throughout the game.

Lucas County Stadium would be the home of the Mud Hens for 37 years. In 1988 the stadium was renamed in honor of Skeldon, a few months before his death. After the departure of the Mud Hens, the ballpark was maintained as part of the Lucas County Recreational Center Complex, and was used for amateur baseball before its demolition.

In 2022 Lucas County approved the demolition of the stadium. The stadium was demolished in March 2023.
