= The Diamond (Richmond, Virginia) =

Baseball stadium in Richmond, Virginia, United States

- Diamond Ballpark

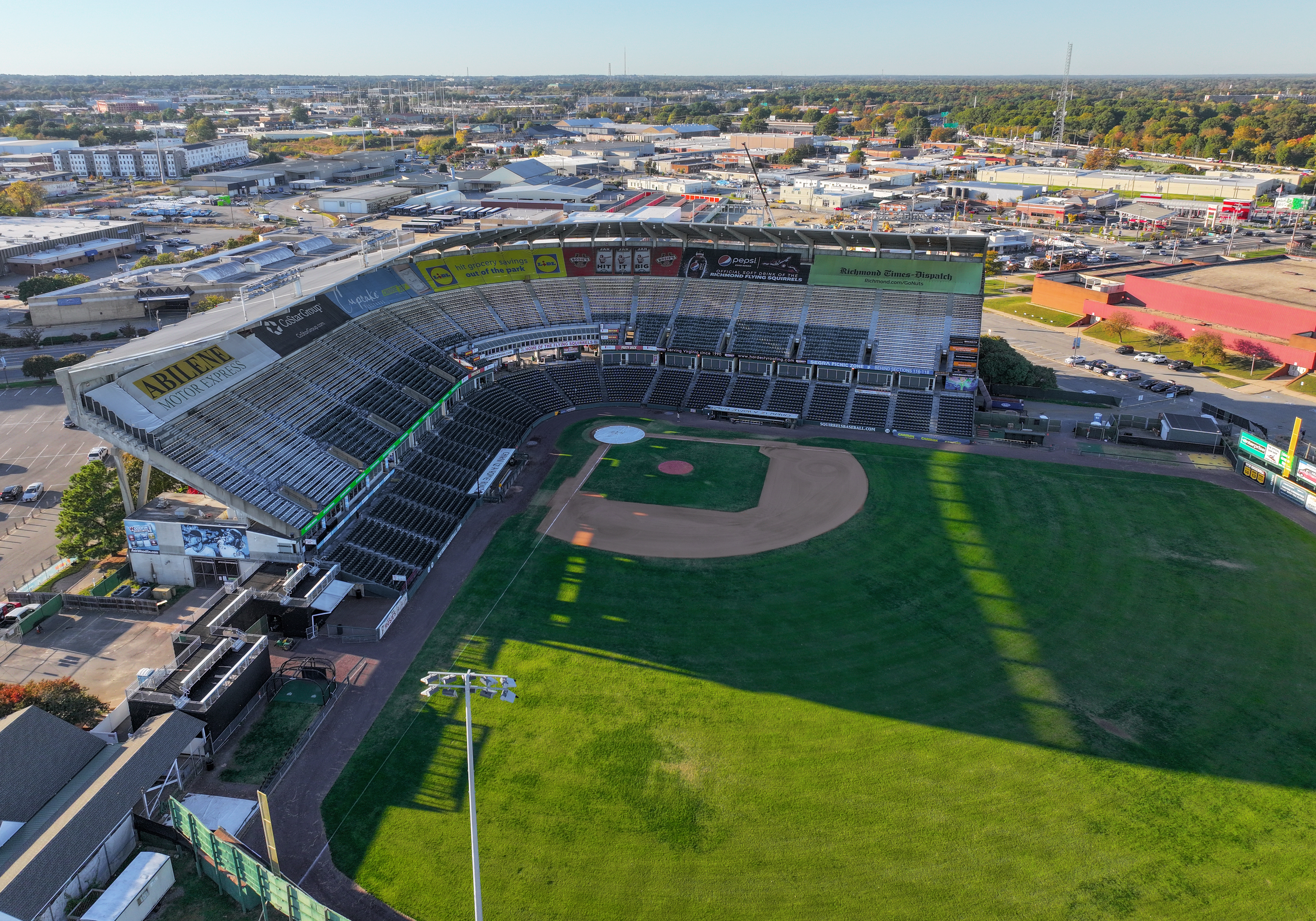
- Aerial view, looking northwest, in 2023

- Location within Virginia Location within the United States
- Interactive map of The Diamond
- Address: 3001 North Arthur Ashe Boulevard; Richmond, Virginia, U.S.
- Coordinates: 37°34′18.50″N 77°27′49.44″W
- Owner: City of Richmond
- Operator: City of Richmond
- Capacity: 12,134 (VCU Rams); 9,560 (Flying Squirrels)
- Surface: Grass
- Field size: Left field: 330 ft (100 m); Center field: 402 ft (123 m); Right field: 330 ft (100 m)

Construction
- Groundbreaking: September 1984
- Opened: April 17, 1985
- Closed: May 16, 2026 (final game)
- Cost: $8 million ($23.9 million in 2025 dollars)
- Architects: Baskervill & Sons, Architects
- Structural engineers: Thomas A. Hanson & Associates, Inc.
- General contractor: McDevitt & Street

Tenants
- VCU Rams (NCAA) 1985–2026; Richmond Braves (IL) 1985–2008; CAA Tournament 1987–1988; Richmond Flying Squirrels (EL) 2010–2025

The Diamond is a baseball stadium located in Richmond, Virginia, USA, on Arthur Ashe Boulevard. It was the home of the Virginia Commonwealth University baseball team through 2026. From 1985 to 2008, it was the home of the Richmond Braves, the Triple-A minor league baseball affiliate of the Atlanta Braves, and from 2010 to 2025, it was the home of the Richmond Flying Squirrels, the Double-A minor league affiliate of the San Francisco Giants. The Diamond seats 12,134 people for baseball; however, for Flying Squirrels games, advertising banners covered up the top rows of the upper deck, reducing seating capacity to 9,560.

In 2026, a 9,585-seat stadium named CarMax Park on an adjacent lot was completed, which was designed as a replacement park. The Diamond is scheduled to be razed and redeveloped as part of a 67-acre mixed-use development.

== History ==
The Diamond replaced the demolished Parker Field, which had been built in 1934, as part of the fair grounds. Parker Field had been converted for baseball in 1954, replacing Mooers Field. Parker Field housed the Braves from 1966 to 1984, with the last game played on August 30 of that year.

In 2003, part of The Diamond's roof was destroyed by Hurricane Isabel, and in 2004 a piece of a concrete beam the size of a football fell on the stands below, though no fans were injured.

The Richmond Braves relocated to Gwinnett County, Georgia, after the 2008 season. One factor in the franchise's decision to relocate was reportedly a failure to reach an agreement on building a new ballpark in Richmond. There was plan by a development group called the Richmond Baseball Initiative to build a new stadium in Shockoe Bottom near Main Street Station. But in August 2009 the company that submitted this ballpark plan withdrew it. Under the plan, the Richmond Braves would have moved to the new stadium while the Diamond would become the sole home to Virginia Commonwealth University athletics. VCU Baseball previously shared the facility with the Braves for home games.

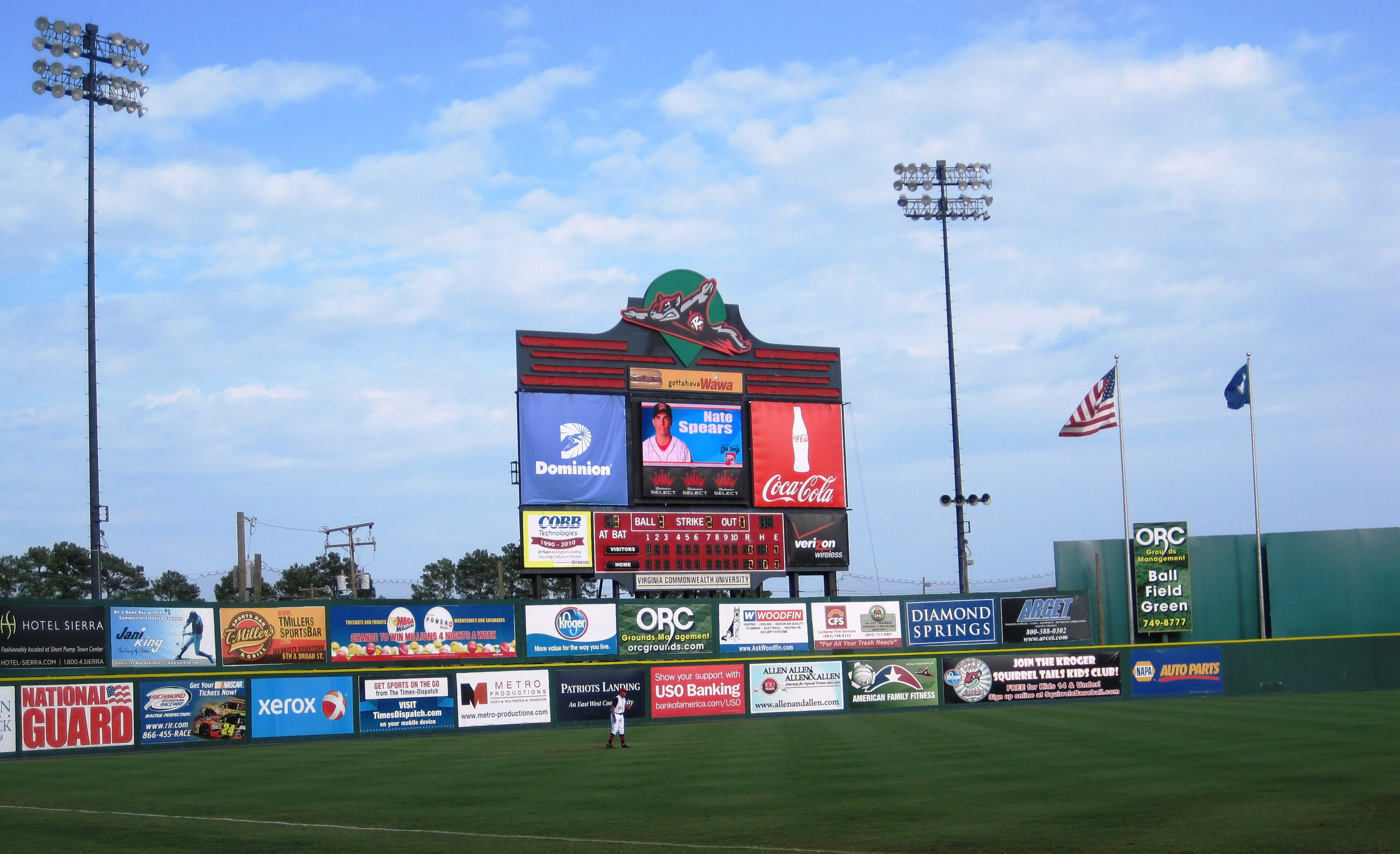
Outfield and scoreboard

The new team announced on October 2, 2009, that they were going to spend $1.5 million on renovations to the ballpark and the RMA gave an additional $75,000 for upgrades. On October 28, 2009, the Richmond Flying Squirrels started renovations on the Diamond. They tore out aluminum benches and started to replace them with 3,200 dark green seats with cup holders. There are now 6,200 seats in the lower level. A new larger sized store was built for the Squirrels. Extensive gutting and remodeling of the offices and new indoor batting cages are parts of the renovation plan as well. For 2011, the scoreboard was enhanced and two new party decks were built in the upper level.

Ownership of The Diamond was transferred from the Richmond Metropolitan Authority to the city of Richmond in 2014.

Ahead of the 2020 season, and in consultation with the San Francisco Giants and VCU Baseball, the Flying Squirrels reduced outfield distances at the Diamond from 8 to 10 feet from left center field around to right center field. Distances up the foul lines will remained the same.

On September 14, 2025, the Flying Squirrels played their final game at The Diamond, losing to the Hartford Yard Goats 5–2 in the tenth inning in front of a sellout crowd.

On May 16, 2026, VCU Baseball played their final game at The Diamond, beating Davidson 12-9 on a walk-off home run.

== Other events ==
The venue hosted the 1987 and 1988 Colonial Athletic Association baseball tournaments, won by East Carolina and George Mason, respectively.

The ballpark hosted the 1992 Triple-A All-Star Game. The team of American League-affiliated All-Stars defeated the team of National League-affiliated All-Stars, 2–1.

The Diamond also hosted the 2019 Eastern League All-Star Game before 9,560 fans, the largest crowd in the game's history.

The venue was to host the 2020 Atlantic 10 Conference baseball tournament, which was cancelled due to the COVID-19 pandemic.

In June 2025, The Firefighters of the Banana Ball League played two games at the Diamond against the Texas Tailgaters. In 2026 the Firefighters returned to play games at CarMax park.

== Replacement ==
Construction began on CarMax Park in August 2024 in a lot directly adjacent to the Diamond. It opened for the start of the Flying Squirrels' 2026 season. VCU played a final season at The Diamond in 2026 and will move into CarMax Park in 2027.

CarMax Park was designed as a replacement for The Diamond which is scheduled to be razed and redeveloped as part of a 67-acre mixed-use development including apartments, hotels, restaurants, retail stores, and green space.

== See also ==
- List of NCAA Division I baseball venues
