= Richmond Braves =

- 1966–2008; Richmond, Virginia
Team logo
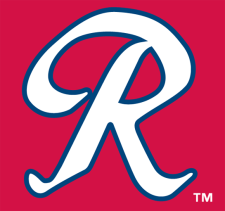
Cap insignia

Minor league affiliations
- Class: Triple-A (1966–2008)
- League: International League (1966–2008)
- Division: South Division

Major league affiliations
- Team: Atlanta Braves (1966–2008)

Minor league titles
- League titles (5): 1978; 1986; 1989; 1994; 2007
- Wild card berths (1): 2007

Team data
- Name: Richmond Braves (1966–2008)
- Ballpark: The Diamond (1985–2008); Parker Field (1966–1985)

The Richmond Braves were an American minor league baseball club based in Richmond, Virginia, the Triple-A International League affiliate of the Atlanta Braves from 1966 to 2008. Owned by the parent Atlanta club and colloquially referred to as the R-Braves, they played their home games at a stadium called The Diamond on Richmond's Northside built for them in 1985, and before then Parker Field on the same site. The franchise moved to Gwinnett County, Georgia, in 2009 to play in the newly built Coolray Field as the Gwinnett Braves.

The R-Braves came to Richmond in 1966 after the Braves' top affiliate, the Atlanta Crackers, moved to Virginia. The then-Milwaukee Braves had bought the Crackers as part of their planned move to Atlanta in 1965; under MLB rules of the day, they bought the Crackers in order to obtain the major league rights to Atlanta. However, an injunction forced the Braves to play a lame-duck season in Milwaukee in 1965, leaving them to operate the Crackers in Atlanta for one more season. When searching for a new home for the Crackers, they landed in Richmond, where Parker Field had been left open by the previous year's move of the Richmond Virginians, a New York Yankees affiliate that moved in 1965.

At the time of the R-Braves' departure to Gwinnett, only the Baltimore Orioles and their Appalachian League affiliate, the Bluefield Orioles, had held a longer affiliation agreement in a single city than Atlanta/Richmond's 43 seasons. The Braves played their final game on September 1, 2008, against their long-time intrastate rivals, the Norfolk Tides. Richmond won, 9–3, in front of a sellout crowd of 12,167. After the game players and alumni threw balls and other keepsakes to fans in the stands, and fans were able to walk onto the field.

In 2010, the Double-A Eastern League's Connecticut Defenders, a San Francisco Giants affiliate (but independently owned), moved to Richmond to play as the Richmond Flying Squirrels.

== Titles ==
The R-Braves won the Governors' Cup, the championship of the International League, five times, and played in ten championship series.

- 1966 – Lost to Toronto
- 1976 – Lost to Syracuse
- 1978 – Defeated Pawtucket
- 1981 – Lost to Columbus
- 1983 – Lost to Tidewater
- 1986 – Defeated Rochester
- 1989 – Defeated Syracuse
- 1994 – Defeated Syracuse
- 2004 – Lost to Buffalo
- 2007 – Defeated Durham; lost to Sacramento (PCL) in AAA Championship Game

== Alumni ==
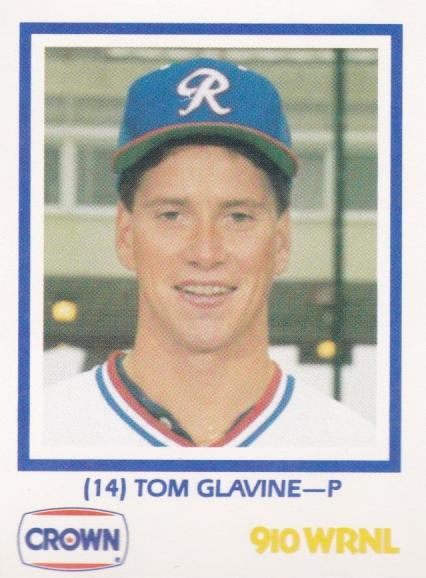
Tom Glavine

- Tommie Aaron
- Jim Acker
- Steve Avery
- Dusty Baker
- Steve Barber
- Howard Battle
- Rob Belloir
- Bruce Benedict
- Wilson Betemit
- Jeff Blauser
- Pedro Borbón, Jr.
- Joe Borowski
- Jim Breazeale
- Brett Butler
- Francisco Cabrera
- José Capellán
- Vinny Castilla
- Chris Chambliss
- Bruce Chen
- Román Colón
- Bobby Cox
- Kyle Davies
- Mark DeRosa
- Jermaine Dye
- Gary Eave
- Yunel Escobar
- Darrell Evans
- Sal Fasano
- Ron Gant
- Ralph Garr
- Marcus Giles
- Ed Giovanola
- Tom Glavine
- Tony Graffanino
- Tommy Greene
- Wes Helms
- Jason Heyward
- Tom House
- Tyler Houston
- Glenn Hubbard
- Chuck James
- Kelly Johnson
- Andruw Jones
- Chipper Jones
- Brian Jordan
- David Justice
- Ryan Klesko
- Ryan Langerhans
- Adam LaRoche
- Tony La Russa
- Mark Lemke
- Kerry Ligtenberg
- Grady Little
- Javy López
- Mickey Mahler
- Rick Mahler
- Jason Marquis
- Andy Marte
- Kent Mercker
- Kevin Millwood
- Charlie Morton
- Mike Mordecai
- Dale Murphy
- David Nied
- John Rocker
- Santiago Rosario
- Chico Ruiz
- Deion Sanders
- Jason Schmidt
- Randall Simon
- Pete Smith
- John Smoltz
- Mike Stanton
- Tony Tarasco
- Billy Taylor
- Scott Thorman
- Andy Tomberlin
- Turk Wendell
- Mark Wohlers
- Earl Williams
- Ned Yost
