= 1984 Milwaukee Brewers season =

1984 Milwaukee Brewers
- League: American League
- Division: East
- Ballpark: Milwaukee County Stadium
- City: Milwaukee, Wisconsin
- Record: 67–94 (.416)
- Divisional place: 7th
- Owners: Bud Selig
- General managers: Harry Dalton
- Managers: Rene Lachemann
- Television: WVTV (Steve Shannon, Mike Hegan); Sportsvue (Bob Uecker, Mike Hegan, Steve Shannon)
- Radio: WTMJ (AM) (Bob Uecker, Pat Hughes)

The 1984 Milwaukee Brewers season was the 15th season for the Brewers in Milwaukee, and the 16th overall.

The Brewers' finished seventh in the American League East with a record of 67 wins and 94 losses, missing the postseason for the 2nd consecutive season and suffered their first losing season since 1977.

== Offseason ==
- December 8, 1983: Ned Yost and Dan Scarpetta (minors) were traded by the Brewers to the Texas Rangers for Jim Sundberg.
- January 16, 1984: Ted Simmons was signed as a free agent with the Brewers.
- January 17, 1984: Don Money was released by the Brewers.
- February 19, 1984: Billy Max (minors) was traded by the Brewers to the New York Mets for Kelvin Moore.

== Regular season ==
=== Season standings ===
AL East
Team	W	L	Pct.	GB	Home	Road
Detroit Tigers	104	58	.642	—	53‍–‍29	51‍–‍29
Toronto Blue Jays	89	73	.549	15	49‍–‍32	40‍–‍41
New York Yankees	87	75	.537	17	51‍–‍30	36‍–‍45
Boston Red Sox	86	76	.531	18	41‍–‍40	45‍–‍36
Baltimore Orioles	85	77	.525	19	44‍–‍37	41‍–‍40
Cleveland Indians	75	87	.463	29	41‍–‍39	34‍–‍48
Milwaukee Brewers	67	94	.416	36½	38‍–‍43	29‍–‍51

=== Record vs. opponents ===
1984 American League record Sources:
Team	BAL	BOS	CAL	CWS	CLE	DET	KC	MIL	MIN	NYY	OAK	SEA	TEX	TOR
Baltimore	—	6–7	8–4	7–5	7–6	7–6	5–7	7–6	5–7	5–8	6–6	9–3	9–3	4–9
Boston	7–6	—	9–3	7–5	10–3	7–6	3–9	9–4	6–6	7–6	7–5	4–8	5–7	5–8
California	4–8	3–9	—	8–5	8–4	4–8	6–7	8–4	4–9	8–4	7–6	9–4	5–8	7–5
Chicago	5–7	5–7	5–8	—	8–4	4–8	5–8	7–5	8–5	7–5	6–7	5–8	5–8	4–8
Cleveland	6–7	3–10	4–8	4–8	—	4–9	6–6	9–4	7–5	2–11	7–5	8–4	9–3	6–7–1
Detroit	6–7	6–7	8–4	8–4	9–4	—	7–5	11–2	9–3	7–6	9–3	6–6	10–2	8–5
Kansas City	7–5	9–3	7–6	8–5	6–6	5–7	—	6–6	6–7	5–7	5–8	9–4	6–7	5–7
Milwaukee	6–7	4–9	4–8	5–7	4–9	2–11	6–6	—	5–7	6–7	4–8	6–6	5–6	10–3
Minnesota	7–5	6–6	9–4	5–8	5–7	3–9	7–6	7–5	—	8–4	8–5	7–6	8–5	1–11
New York	8–5	6–7	4–8	5–7	11–2	6–7	7–5	7–6	4–8	—	8–4	7–5	6–6	8–5
Oakland	6–6	5–7	6–7	7–6	5–7	3–9	8–5	8–4	5–8	4–8	—	8–5	8–5	4–8
Seattle	3–9	8–4	4–9	8–5	4–8	6–6	4–9	6–6	6–7	5–7	5–8	—	10–3	5–7
Texas	3–9	7–5	8–5	8–5	3–9	2–10	7–6	6–5	5–8	6–6	5–8	3–10	—	6–6
Toronto	9–4	8–5	5–7	8–4	7–6–1	5–8	7–5	3–10	11–1	5–8	8–4	7–5	6–6	—

=== Notable transactions ===
- April 18, 1984: Paul Hartzell was signed as a free agent by the Brewers.
- May 9, 1984: Paul Hartzell was released by the Brewers.
- June 9, 1984: Paul Hartzell was signed as a free agent by the Brewers.
- June 9, 1984: Chuck Hensley was purchased by the Milwaukee Brewers from the Oakland Athletics.
- July 2, 1984: Chuck Hensley was released by the Milwaukee Brewers.
- July 3, 1984: Danny Boone was released by the Brewers.
- August 8, 1984: Jim Kern was signed as a free agent with the Milwaukee Brewers.
- August 11, 1984, Frank Robinson was hired as hitting coach.

==== Draft picks ====
- June 4, 1984: John Jaha was drafted by the Brewers in the 14th round of the 1984 Major League Baseball draft. Player signed September 3, 1984.

=== Roster ===
1984 Milwaukee Brewers
Roster
Pitchers: 46 Jerry Augustine; 46 Andy Beene; 48 Mike Caldwell; 49 Tom Candiotti; 47 Jaime Cocanower; 34 Rollie Fingers; 40 Bob Gibson; 30 Moose Haas; 39 Paul Hartzell; 31 Jim Kern; 27 Pete Ladd; 33,41 Jack Lazorko; 10 Bob McClure; 43 Chuck Porter; 41 Ray Searage; 20 Don Sutton; 42 Tom Tellmann; 36 Rick Waits	Catchers: 21 Bill Schroeder; 8 Jim Sundberg; Infielders: 15 Cecil Cooper; 17 Jim Gantner; 13 Roy Howell; 26 Willie Lozado; 4 Paul Molitor; 2 Randy Ready; 11 Ed Romero; 19 Robin Yount	Outfielders: 29 Mark Brouhard; 25 Bobby Clark; 14 Dion James; 5 Doug Loman; 28 Rick Manning; 22 Charlie Moore; 24 Ben Oglivie; Other batters: 23 Ted Simmons	Manager: 9 Rene Lachemann; Coaches: 45 Pat Dobson (Pitching); 1 Dave Garcia (Third Base); 12 Larry Haney (Bullpen); 7 Frank Robinson (Hitting, 8/10 - 9/30); 35 Tom Trebelhorn (First Base)

== Player stats ==
=== Batting ===
==== Starters by position ====
Note: Pos = Position; G = Games played; AB = At bats; H = Hits; Avg. = Batting average; HR = Home runs; RBI = Runs batted in

Pos	Player	G	AB	H	Avg.	HR	RBI
C	Jim Sundberg	110	348	91	.261	7	43
1B	Cecil Cooper	148	603	166	.275	11	67
2B	Jim Gantner	153	613	173	.282	3	56
SS	Robin Yount	160	624	186	.298	16	80
3B	Ed Romero	116	357	90	.252	1	31
LF	Ben Oglivie	131	461	121	.262	12	60
CF	Rick Manning	119	341	85	.249	7	31
RF	Dion James	128	387	114	.295	1	30
DH	Ted Simmons	132	497	110	.221	4	52

==== Other batters ====
Note: G = Games played; AB = At bats; H = Hits; Avg. = Batting average; HR = Home runs; RBI = Runs batted in

Player	G	AB	H	Avg.	HR	RBI
Bill Schroeder	61	210	54	.257	14	25
Mark Brouhard	66	197	47	.239	6	22
Charlie Moore	70	188	44	.234	2	17
Bobby Clark	58	169	44	.260	2	16
Roy Howell	68	164	38	.232	4	17
Randy Ready	37	123	23	.187	3	13
Willie Lozado	43	107	29	.271	1	20
Doug Loman	23	76	21	.276	2	12
Paul Molitor	13	46	10	.217	0	6

=== Pitching ===
==== Starting pitchers ====
Note: G = Games pitched; IP = Innings pitched; W = Wins; L = Losses; ERA = Earned run average; SO = Strikeouts

Player	G	IP	W	L	ERA	SO
Don Sutton	33	213.0	14	12	3.77	143
Moose Haas	31	189.1	9	11	3.99	84
Jaime Cocanower	33	174.2	8	16	4.02	65
Mike Caldwell	26	126.0	6	13	4.64	34
Chuck Porter	17	81.1	6	4	3.87	48

==== Other pitchers ====
Note: G = Games pitched; IP = Innings pitched; W = Wins; L = Losses; ERA = Earned run average; SO = Strikeouts

Player	G	IP	W	L	ERA	SO
Bob McClure	39	139.2	4	8	4.38	68
Bob Gibson	18	69.0	2	5	4.96	54
Tom Candiotti	8	32.1	2	2	5.29	23
Andy Beene	5	18.2	0	2	11.09	11
Paul Hartzell	4	10.1	0	1	7.84	3

==== Relief pitchers ====
Note: G = Games pitched; W = Wins; L = Losses; SV = Saves; ERA = Earned run average; SO = Strikeouts

Player	G	W	L	SV	ERA	SO
Rollie Fingers	33	1	2	23	1.96	40
Pete Ladd	54	4	9	3	5.24	75
Tom Tellmann	50	6	3	4	2.78	28
Rick Waits	47	2	4	3	3.58	49
Ray Searage	21	2	1	6	0.70	29
Jack Lazorko	15	0	1	1	4.31	24
Jim Kern	6	1	0	0	0.00	4
Jerry Augustine	4	0	0	0	0.00	3

== Farm system ==
The Brewers' farm system consisted of five minor league affiliates in 1984.

Level	Team	League	Manager
Triple-A	Vancouver Canadians	Pacific Coast League	Tony Muser
Double-A	El Paso Diablos	Texas League	Terry Bevington
Class A	Stockton Ports	California League	Tim Nordbrook, Mike Pazik, and Andy Etchebarren
Class A	Beloit Brewers	Midwest League	Tom Gamboa
Rookie	Paintsville Brewers	Appalachian League	Ron Hansen
