= 1983 Cleveland Indians season =

1983 Cleveland Indians
- League: American League
- Division: East
- Ballpark: Cleveland Municipal Stadium
- City: Cleveland, Ohio
- Owners: Steve O'Neill
- General managers: Phil Seghi
- Managers: Mike Ferraro, Pat Corrales
- Television: WUAB
- Radio: WWWE

The 1983 Cleveland Indians season was the 83rd for the franchise. It was the final season under the ownership of Steve O'Neill, who had owned the team since 1978. He died on August 29, 1983, with his estate owning the team until 1986.

== Offseason ==
- November 18, 1982: Ed Whitson was traded by the Indians to the San Diego Padres for Broderick Perkins and Juan Eichelberger.
- December 9, 1982: Von Hayes was traded by the Indians to the Philadelphia Phillies for Manny Trillo, Jay Baller, Julio Franco, George Vukovich, and Jerry Willard.
- December 15, 1982: Rick Manning was signed as a free agent by the Indians.

== Regular season ==
=== Season standings ===
AL East
Team	W	L	Pct.	GB	Home	Road
Baltimore Orioles	98	64	.605	—	50‍–‍31	48‍–‍33
Detroit Tigers	92	70	.568	6	48‍–‍33	44‍–‍37
New York Yankees	91	71	.562	7	51‍–‍30	40‍–‍41
Toronto Blue Jays	89	73	.549	9	48‍–‍33	41‍–‍40
Milwaukee Brewers	87	75	.537	11	52‍–‍29	35‍–‍46
Boston Red Sox	78	84	.481	20	38‍–‍43	40‍–‍41
Cleveland Indians	70	92	.432	28	36‍–‍45	34‍–‍47

=== Record vs. opponents ===
1983 American League record Sources:
Team	BAL	BOS	CAL	CWS	CLE	DET	KC	MIL	MIN	NYY	OAK	SEA	TEX	TOR
Baltimore	—	8–5	7–5	7–5	6–7	5–8	8–4	11–2	8–4	6–7	8–4	8–4	9–3	7–6
Boston	5–8	—	6–6	6–6	7–6	4–9	5–7	4–9	5–7	7–6	8–4	7–5	7–5	7–6
California	5–7	6–6	—	3–10	8–4	4–8	6–7	6–6	6–7	5–7	5–8	6–7	6–7	4–8
Chicago	5–7	6–6	10–3	—	8–4	8–4	9–4	4–8	8–5	8–4	8–5	12–1	8–5	5–7
Cleveland	7–6	6–7	4–8	4–8	—	5–8	7–5	3–10	6–6	6–7	7–5	8–4	3–9	4–9
Detroit	8–5	9–4	8–4	4–8	8–5	—	7–5	6–7	9–3	5–8	6–6	8–4	8–4	6–7
Kansas City	4–8	7–5	7–6	4–9	5–7	5–7	—	6–6	6–7	6–6	7–6	8–5	8–5–1	6–6
Milwaukee	2–11	9–4	6–6	8–4	10–3	7–6	6–6	—	8–4	4–9	6–6	5–7	8–4	8–5
Minnesota	4–8	7–5	7–6	5–8	6–6	3–9	7–6	4–8	—	4–8	4–9	9–4	5–8	5–7
New York	7–6	6–7	7–5	4–8	7–6	8–5	6–6	9–4	8–4	—	8–4	7–5	7–5	7–6
Oakland	4–8	4–8	8–5	5–8	5–7	6–6	6–7	6–6	9–4	4–8	—	9–4	2–11	6–6
Seattle	4–8	5–7	7–6	1–12	4–8	4–8	5–8	7–5	4–9	5–7	4–9	—	6–7	4–8
Texas	3–9	5–7	7–6	5–8	9–3	4–8	5–8–1	4–8	8–5	5–7	11–2	7–6	—	4–8
Toronto	6–7	6–7	8–4	7–5	9–4	7–6	6–6	5–8	7–5	6–7	6–6	8–4	8–4	—

=== Notable transactions ===
- April 1, 1983: Jerry Dybzinski was traded by the Indians to the Chicago White Sox for Pat Tabler.
- June 6, 1983: Rick Manning and Rick Waits were traded by the Indians to the Milwaukee Brewers for Gorman Thomas, Ernie Camacho and Jamie Easterly.
- August 17, 1983: Manny Trillo was traded by the Indians to the Montreal Expos for Don Carter (minors) and $300,000.

=== Opening Day Lineup ===
Opening Day Starters
#	Name	Position
21	Mike Hargrove	1B
11	Toby Harrah	3B
26	Bake McBride	RF
29	Andre Thornton	DH
24	George Vukovich	LF
8	Manny Trillo	2B
20	Rick Manning	CF
9	Ron Hassey	C
14	Julio Franco	SS
43	Rick Sutcliffe	P

=== Roster ===
1983 Cleveland Indians
Roster
Pitchers: 51 Bud Anderson; 39 Len Barker; 27 Rich Barnes; 32 Rick Behenna; 28 Bert Blyleven; 45 Tom Brennan; 40,13 Ernie Camacho; 36 Jamie Easterly; 13 Juan Eichelberger; 48 Ed Glynn; 44 Neal Heaton; 54 Mike Jeffcoat; 35 Jerry Reed; 38 Lary Sorensen; 37 Dan Spillner; 43 Rick Sutcliffe; 36 Rick Waits	Catchers: 23 Chris Bando; 17 Jim Essian; 9 Ron Hassey; Infielders: 22 Mike Fischlin; 14 Julio Franco; 21 Mike Hargrove; 11 Toby Harrah; 16 Jack Perconte; 15 Broderick Perkins; 8 Manny Trillo	Outfielders: 7 Alan Bannister; 8 Carmen Castillo; 25 Wil Culmer; 27 Miguel Diloné; 20 Rick Manning; 26 Bake McBride; 30 Karl Pagel; 54,12 Kevin Rhomberg; 10 Pat Tabler; 20 Gorman Thomas; 24 George Vukovich; Other batters: 29 Andre Thornton; 32 Otto Vélez	Manager: 18 Pat Corrales (Jul 31 - Oct 2); 2 Mike Ferraro (Apr 4 - Jul 30); Coaches: 4 Johnny Goryl (Third Base); 47 Don McMahon (Pitching); 6 Dennis Sommers (Bullpen); 1 Ed Napoleon (First Base)

== Game log ==
=== Regular season ===
1983 regular season game log: 70–92 (Home: 36–45; Away: 34–47)
April: 9–11 (Home: 5–4; Away: 4–7)

#	Date	Time (ET)	Opponent	Score	Win	Loss	Save	Time of Game	Attendance	Record	Box/ Streak

May: 12–14 (Home: 5–5; Away: 7–9)

#	Date	Time (ET)	Opponent	Score	Win	Loss	Save	Time of Game	Attendance	Record	Box/ Streak

June: 12–16 (Home: 7–8; Away: 5–8)

#	Date	Time (ET)	Opponent	Score	Win	Loss	Save	Time of Game	Attendance	Record	Box/ Streak

July: 8–19 (Home: 5–10; Away: 3–9)

#	Date	Time (ET)	Opponent	Score	Win	Loss	Save	Time of Game	Attendance	Record	Box/ Streak

August: 17–16 (Home: 8–12; Away: 9–4)

#	Date	Time (ET)	Opponent	Score	Win	Loss	Save	Time of Game	Attendance	Record	Box/ Streak

September: 11–15 (Home: 6–6; Away: 5–9)

#	Date	Time (ET)	Opponent	Score	Win	Loss	Save	Time of Game	Attendance	Record	Box/ Streak

October: 1–1 (Home: 0–0; Away: 1–1)

#	Date	Time (ET)	Opponent	Score	Win	Loss	Save	Time of Game	Attendance	Record	Box/ Streak

== Player stats ==
=== Batting ===
Note: G = Games played; AB = At bats; R = Runs scored; H = Hits; 2B = Doubles; 3B = Triples; HR = Home runs; RBI = Runs batted in; AVG = Batting average; SB = Stolen bases

Player	G	AB	R	H	2B	3B	HR	RBI	AVG	SB
Chris Bando	48	121	15	31	3	0	4	15	.256	0
Alan Bannister	117	377	51	100	25	4	5	45	.265	6
Carmelo Castillo	23	36	9	10	2	1	1	3	.278	1
Wil Culmer	7	19	0	2	0	0	0	1	.105	0
Miguel Dilone	32	68	15	13	3	1	0	7	.191	5
Jim Essian	48	93	11	19	4	0	2	11	.204	0
Mike Fischlin	95	225	31	47	5	2	2	23	.209	9
Julio Franco	149	560	68	153	24	8	8	80	.273	32
Mike Hargrove	134	469	57	134	21	4	3	57	.286	0
Toby Harrah	138	526	81	140	23	1	9	53	.266	16
Ron Hassey	117	341	48	92	21	0	6	42	.270	2
Rick Manning	50	194	20	54	6	0	1	10	.278	7
Bake McBride	70	230	21	67	8	1	1	18	.291	8
Karl Pagel	8	20	1	6	0	0	0	1	.300	0
Jack Perconte	14	26	1	7	1	0	0	0	.269	3
Broderick Perkins	79	184	23	50	10	0	0	24	.272	1
Kevin Rhomberg	12	21	2	10	0	0	0	2	.476	1
Pat Tabler	124	430	56	125	23	5	6	65	.291	2
Gorman Thomas	106	371	51	82	17	0	17	51	.221	8
Andre Thornton	141	508	78	143	27	1	17	77	.281	4
Manny Trillo	88	320	33	87	13	1	1	29	.272	1
Otto Velez	10	25	1	2	0	0	0	1	.080	0
George Vukovich	124	312	31	77	13	2	3	44	.247	3
Team totals	162	5476	704	1451	249	31	86	659	.265	109

=== Pitching ===
Note: W = Wins; L = Losses; ERA = Earned run average; G = Games pitched; GS = Games started; SV = Saves; IP = Innings pitched; H = Hits allowed; R = Runs allowed; ER = Earned runs allowed; BB = Walks allowed; K = Strikeouts

Player	W	L	ERA	G	GS	SV	IP	H	R	ER	BB	K
Bud Anderson	1	6	4.08	39	1	7	68.1	64	34	31	32	32
Len Barker	8	13	5.11	24	24	0	149.1	150	92	85	52	105
Rich Barnes	1	1	6.94	4	2	0	11.1	18	10	9	10	2
Rick Behenna	0	2	4.15	5	4	0	26.0	22	13	12	14	9
Bert Blyleven	7	10	3.91	24	24	0	156.1	160	74	68	44	123
Tom Brennan	2	2	3.86	11	5	0	39.2	45	22	17	8	21
Ernie Camacho	0	1	5.06	4	0	0	5.1	5	3	3	2	2
Jamie Easterly	4	2	3.63	41	0	3	57.0	69	25	23	22	39
Juan Eichelberger	4	11	4.90	28	15	0	134.0	132	80	73	59	56
Ed Glynn	0	2	5.84	11	0	0	12.1	22	11	8	6	13
Neal Heaton	11	7	4.16	39	16	7	149.1	157	79	69	44	75
Mike Jeffcoat	1	3	3.31	11	2	0	32.2	32	13	12	13	9
Jerry Reed	0	0	7.17	7	0	0	21.1	26	19	17	9	11
Lary Sorensen	12	11	4.24	36	34	0	222.2	238	112	105	65	76
Dan Spillner	2	9	5.07	60	0	8	92.1	117	54	52	38	48
Rick Sutcliffe	17	11	4.29	36	35	0	243.1	251	131	116	102	160
Rick Waits	0	1	4.58	8	0	0	19.2	23	13	10	9	13
Team totals	70	92	4.43	162	162	25	1441.2	1531	785	710	529	794

== Awards and honors ==
All-Star Game

== Farm system ==
Level	Team	League	Manager
AAA	Charleston Charlies	International League	Doc Edwards
AA	Buffalo Bisons	Eastern League	Al Gallagher
A	Waterloo Indians	Midwest League	Gomer Hodge
A-Short Season	Batavia Trojans	New York–Penn League	Brian Doyle
