= 1983 Milwaukee Brewers season =

1983 Milwaukee Brewers
- League: American League
- Division: East
- Ballpark: Milwaukee County Stadium
- City: Milwaukee, Wisconsin, United States
- Record: 87–75 (.537)
- Divisional place: 5th
- Owners: Bud Selig
- General managers: Harry Dalton
- Managers: Harvey Kuenn
- Television: WVTV (Steve Shannon, Mike Hegan)
- Radio: WTMJ (AM) (Bob Uecker, Dwayne Mosley)

The 1983 Milwaukee Brewers season was the 15th in franchise history and 14th in Milwaukee. As defending American League champions, they sought to return to the World Series. This season involved the Brewers finishing fifth in the American League East with a record of 87 wins and 75 losses, missing the playoffs for the first time since 1980.

== Offseason ==
- December 19, 1982: Ernie Camacho was signed as a free agent by the Brewers.
- January 11, 1983: 1983 Major League Baseball draft
  - Bobby Thigpen was drafted by the Brewers in the 7th round, but did not sign.
  - Jim Morris was drafted by the Brewers in the 1st round (4th pick) of the Secondary Phase.

== Regular season ==
=== Season standings ===
AL East
Team	W	L	Pct.	GB	Home	Road
Baltimore Orioles	98	64	.605	—	50‍–‍31	48‍–‍33
Detroit Tigers	92	70	.568	6	48‍–‍33	44‍–‍37
New York Yankees	91	71	.562	7	51‍–‍30	40‍–‍41
Toronto Blue Jays	89	73	.549	9	48‍–‍33	41‍–‍40
Milwaukee Brewers	87	75	.537	11	52‍–‍29	35‍–‍46
Boston Red Sox	78	84	.481	20	38‍–‍43	40‍–‍41
Cleveland Indians	70	92	.432	28	36‍–‍45	34‍–‍47

=== Record vs. opponents ===
1983 American League record Sources:
Team	BAL	BOS	CAL	CWS	CLE	DET	KC	MIL	MIN	NYY	OAK	SEA	TEX	TOR
Baltimore	—	8–5	7–5	7–5	6–7	5–8	8–4	11–2	8–4	6–7	8–4	8–4	9–3	7–6
Boston	5–8	—	6–6	6–6	7–6	4–9	5–7	4–9	5–7	7–6	8–4	7–5	7–5	7–6
California	5–7	6–6	—	3–10	8–4	4–8	6–7	6–6	6–7	5–7	5–8	6–7	6–7	4–8
Chicago	5–7	6–6	10–3	—	8–4	8–4	9–4	4–8	8–5	8–4	8–5	12–1	8–5	5–7
Cleveland	7–6	6–7	4–8	4–8	—	5–8	7–5	3–10	6–6	6–7	7–5	8–4	3–9	4–9
Detroit	8–5	9–4	8–4	4–8	8–5	—	7–5	6–7	9–3	5–8	6–6	8–4	8–4	6–7
Kansas City	4–8	7–5	7–6	4–9	5–7	5–7	—	6–6	6–7	6–6	7–6	8–5	8–5–1	6–6
Milwaukee	2–11	9–4	6–6	8–4	10–3	7–6	6–6	—	8–4	4–9	6–6	5–7	8–4	8–5
Minnesota	4–8	7–5	7–6	5–8	6–6	3–9	7–6	4–8	—	4–8	4–9	9–4	5–8	5–7
New York	7–6	6–7	7–5	4–8	7–6	8–5	6–6	9–4	8–4	—	8–4	7–5	7–5	7–6
Oakland	4–8	4–8	8–5	5–8	5–7	6–6	6–7	6–6	9–4	4–8	—	9–4	2–11	6–6
Seattle	4–8	5–7	7–6	1–12	4–8	4–8	5–8	7–5	4–9	5–7	4–9	—	6–7	4–8
Texas	3–9	5–7	7–6	5–8	9–3	4–8	5–8–1	4–8	8–5	5–7	11–2	7–6	—	4–8
Toronto	6–7	6–7	8–4	7–5	9–4	7–6	6–6	5–8	7–5	6–7	6–6	8–4	8–4	—

=== Notable transactions ===
- April 1, 1983: Steve Lake was traded by the Brewers to the Chicago Cubs for a player to be named later and cash. The Cubs completed the trade by sending Rich Buonantony (minors) to the Brewers on October 24.
- June 6, 1983: 1983 Major League Baseball draft
  - Dan Plesac was drafted by the Brewers in the 1st round (26th pick). Player signed June 8, 1983.
  - Joey Meyer was drafted by the Brewers in the 5th round.
- June 6, 1983: Gorman Thomas, Ernie Camacho and Jamie Easterly were traded by the Brewers to the Cleveland Indians for Rick Manning and Rick Waits.
- July 15, 1983: Danny Boone was signed as a free agent by the Brewers.
- August 31, 1983: Sixto Lezcano was traded by the San Diego Padres with a player to be named later to the Philadelphia Phillies for players to be named later.

=== Roster ===
1983 Milwaukee Brewers
Roster
Pitchers: 46 Jerry Augustine; 26 Andy Beene; 48 Mike Caldwell; 49 Tom Candiotti; 28 Jamie Easterly; 40 Bob Gibson; 30 Moose Haas; 27 Pete Ladd; 10 Bob McClure; 43 Chuck Porter; 41 Jim Slaton; 20,21 Don Sutton; 42 Tom Tellmann; 50 Pete Vuckovich; 36 Rick Waits	Catchers: 21 Bill Schroeder; 23 Ted Simmons; 5 Ned Yost; Infielders: 15 Cecil Cooper; 17 Jim Gantner; 4 Paul Molitor; 8 Rob Picciolo; 2 Randy Ready; 11 Ed Romero; 19 Robin Yount	Outfielders: 29 Mark Brouhard; 16 Marshall Edwards; 14 Dion James; 28 Rick Manning; 22 Charlie Moore; 24 Ben Oglivie; 26 Bob Skube; 20 Gorman Thomas; Other batters: 13 Roy Howell; 7 Don Money	Manager: 32 Harvey Kuenn; Coaches: 45 Pat Dobson (Pitching); 1 Dave Garcia (Third Base); 12 Larry Haney (Bullpen); 18 Ron Hansen (First Base)

== Player stats ==
=== Batting ===
==== Starters by position ====
Note: Pos = Position; G = Games played; AB = At bats; H = Hits; Avg. = Batting average; HR = Home runs; RBI = Runs batted in

Pos	Player	G	AB	H	Avg.	HR	RBI
C	Ted Simmons	153	600	185	.308	13	108
1B	Cecil Cooper	160	661	203	.307	30	126
2B	Jim Gantner	161	603	170	.282	11	74
SS	Robin Yount	149	578	178	.308	17	80
3B	Paul Molitor	152	613	167	.272	15	47
LF	Ben Oglivie	125	411	115	.280	13	66
CF	Rick Manning	108	375	86	.229	3	33
RF	Charlie Moore	151	529	150	.284	2	49
DH	Roy Howell	69	194	54	.278	4	25

==== Other batters ====
Note: G = Games played; AB = At bats; H = Hits; Avg. = Batting average; HR = Home runs; RBI = Runs batted in

Player	G	AB	H	Avg.	HR	RBI
Ned Yost	61	196	44	.224	6	28
Mark Brouhard	56	185	51	.276	7	23
Gorman Thomas	46	164	30	.183	5	18
Ed Romero	59	145	46	.317	1	18
Don Money	43	114	17	.149	1	8
Marshall Edwards	51	74	22	.297	0	5
Bill Schroeder	23	73	13	.178	3	7
Randy Ready	12	37	15	.405	1	6
Rob Picciolo	14	27	6	.222	0	1
Bob Skube	12	25	5	.200	0	9
Dion James	11	20	2	.100	0	1

=== Pitching ===
==== Starting pitchers ====
Note: G = Games pitched; IP = Innings pitched; W = Wins; L = Losses; ERA = Earned run average; SO = Strikeouts

Player	G	IP	W	L	ERA	SO
Mike Caldwell	32	228.1	12	11	4.53	58
Don Sutton	31	220.0	8	13	4.08	134
Moose Haas	25	179.0	13	3	3.27	75
Bob McClure	24	142.0	9	9	4.50	68
Chuck Porter	25	134.0	7	9	4.50	76
Tom Candiotti	10	55.2	4	4	3.23	21
Pete Vuckovich	3	14.2	0	2	4.91	10

==== Other pitchers ====
Note: G = Games pitched; IP = Innings pitched; W = Wins; L = Losses; ERA = Earned run average; SO = Strikeouts

Player	G	IP	W	L	ERA	SO
Bob Gibson	27	80.2	3	4	3.90	46
Jerry Augustine	34	64.1	3	3	5.74	40
Rick Waits	10	30.0	0	2	5.10	20
Jaime Cocanower	5	30.0	2	0	1.80	8

==== Relief pitchers ====
Note: G = Games pitched; W = Wins; L = Losses; SV = Saves; ERA = Earned run average; SO = Strikeouts

Player	G	W	L	SV	ERA	SO
Pete Ladd	44	3	4	25	2.55	41
Jim Slaton	46	14	6	5	4.33	38
Tom Tellmann	44	9	4	8	2.80	48
Jamie Easterly	12	0	1	1	3.86	6
Andy Beene	1	0	0	0	4.50	0

== Awards and honors ==
- Cecil Cooper, Roberto Clemente Award

== Farm system ==
The Brewers' farm system consisted of five minor league affiliates in 1983. The Paintsville Brewers won the Appalachian League championship.

Level	Team	League	Manager
Triple-A	Vancouver Canadians	Pacific Coast League	Dick Phillips and Tony Muser
Double-A	El Paso Diablos	Texas League	Tony Muser and Lee Sigman
Class A	Stockton Ports	California League	Terry Bevington
Class A	Beloit Brewers	Midwest League	Tim Nordbrook
Rookie	Paintsville Brewers	Appalachian League	Tom Gamboa
