= Manny Trillo =

Venezuelan baseball player (born 1950)

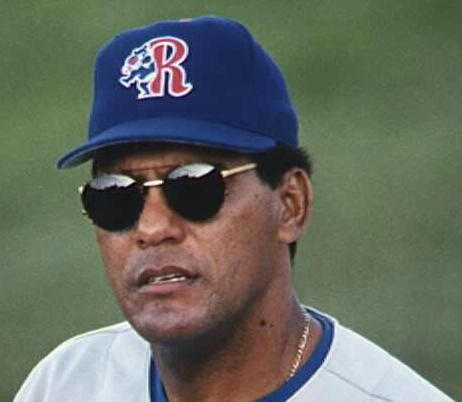
- Second baseman
- Born: December 25, 1950 (age 75); Caripito, Venezuela
- Batted: Right Threw: Right

MLB debut
- June 28, 1973, for the Oakland Athletics

Last MLB appearance
- May 20, 1989, for the Cincinnati Reds

MLB statistics
- Batting average: .263
- Home runs: 61
- Runs batted in: 571
- Stats at Baseball Reference

Teams
- Oakland Athletics (1973–1974); Chicago Cubs (1975–1978); Philadelphia Phillies (1979–1982); Cleveland Indians (1983); Montreal Expos (1983); San Francisco Giants (1984–1985); Chicago Cubs (1986–1988); Cincinnati Reds (1989)

Career highlights and awards
- 4× All-Star (1977, 1981–1983); 2× World Series champion (1974, 1980); NLCS MVP (1980); 3× Gold Glove Award (1979, 1981, 1982); 2× Silver Slugger Award (1980, 1981); Philadelphia Phillies Wall of Fame

Member of the Venezuelan

Baseball Hall of Fame
- Induction: 2007

Jesús Manuel Marcano Trillo (/ˈtriːjoʊ/ TREE-yoh; born December 25, 1950), nicknamed "Indio", is a Venezuelan former professional baseball player and coach. He played in Major League Baseball (MLB) as a second baseman, most prominently with the Chicago Cubs where he established himself as an All-Star player, and then with the Philadelphia Phillies where he was an integral member of the 1980 World Series winning team.

A four-time All-Star with a strong throwing arm, Trillo was known as one of the best fielding second basemen of his era, winning three Gold Glove Awards during his career (1979, 1981, 1982). In 1982, he set a Major League record for second basemen when he fielded 479 consecutive chances without an error. He also played for the Oakland Athletics, Cleveland Indians, Montreal Expos, San Francisco Giants, and Cincinnati Reds. After his playing career he worked as a minor league coach for several major league organizations.

In 1983, the Phillies selected Trillo as the second baseman for their Centennial Team, commemorating the best players of the first 100 years in franchise history. He was inducted into the Venezuelan Baseball Hall of Fame and Museum in 2007 and in 2020, he was selected for enshrinement on the Philadelphia Baseball Wall of Fame.

== Baseball career ==
=== Early life ===
Trillo was born on December 25, 1950 in Caripito in northeastern Venezuela, where his father worked in the oil industry. He grew up in the small town of Quiriquire, where a physical education instructor encouraged him to contact former major league player, Pompeyo Davalillo, who had played for the Washington Senators in 1953. Trillo spent two years training under Davalillo's tutelage and in 1968 he signed a contract to play for the Philadelphia Phillies as a catcher.

=== Minor league career ===
Trillo was converted into a third baseman by his first minor league manager, Dallas Green. In 1969, he was selected by the Oakland Athletics from the Phillies in the Rule 5 draft. In 1973, manager Sherm Lollar allowed Trillo to gain experience as a second baseman while playing for the Athletics' Triple A team, the Tucson Toros. In 130 games with the Toros he posted a .312 batting average and led the team with 78 RBIs. His impressive performance earned him a promotion and he made his Major League debut at the age of 22 with Oakland on June 28, 1973.

=== Oakland Athletics ===
Trillo remained with the club as the Athletics won the American League Western Division pennant by six games over the Kansas City Royals. Trillo was involved in a pair of controversies about his roster eligibility for the 1973 postseason. MLB strictly enforced a rule that only players on a major league roster on August 31 were eligible for the postseason. After José Morales' contract was sold to the Montreal Expos on September 18 and Bill North severely sprained an ankle, the A's received approval from their American League Championship Series opponent the Baltimore Orioles to allow the additions to their roster of both Trillo and Allan Lewis. A's owner Charlie Finley submitted the same request to the New York Mets, his team's 1973 World Series opponent, but New York only approved Lewis. When Mike Andrews committed two errors in a four-run twelfth inning of Oakland's Game 2 defeat, Finley attempted to have Andrews waived onto the disabled list in order to activate Trillo. Commissioner of Baseball Bowie Kuhn ruled against Finley, who was forced to reinstate Andrews for Game 4 while Trillo remained on the ineligible list.

In April 1974, Trillo played 12 games for the Athletics but only had a .100 batting average when he was sent back to the Tucson Toros. He was eventually brought back to the major leagues in September. He appeared in one game of the 1974 American League Championship Series against the Baltimore Orioles, but did not make any further appearances as the Athletics defeated the Los Angeles Dodgers in the 1974 World Series.

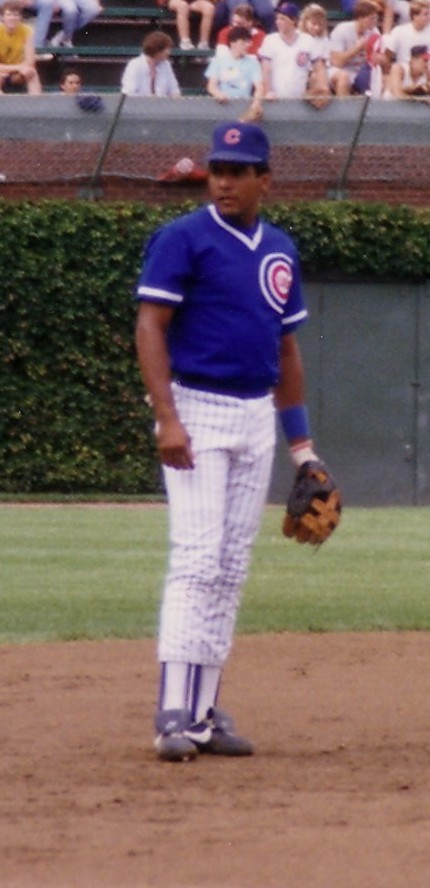
Trillo playing for the Cubs in 1988.

=== Chicago Cubs ===
On October 23, 1974, Trillo was traded along with Darold Knowles and Bob Locker to the Chicago Cubs for Billy Williams. In his first full season in the Major Leagues, Trillo had a career-high 70 runs batted in, and he finished third in the 1975 National League Rookie of the Year Award balloting behind John Montefusco and Gary Carter. With the Cubs, Trillo developed a reputation for his impressive defensive skills and, coalesced with Cubs' shortstop Iván DeJesús into one of the best double play combinations in baseball. He led National League second basemen in assists for four consecutive seasons from 1975 to 1978.

In 1977, he led the league with a .380 batting average as of June 9th, earning him his first selection to the National League All-Star team as a reserve player behind Joe Morgan. In 1978 Trillo led National League second basemen in double plays turned. He remained with the Cubs for four seasons before being traded to the Philadelphia Phillies on February 23, 1979, as part of an eight-player trade.

=== Philadelphia Phillies ===
Trillo was reunited with his former minor league manager in Philadelphia when Dallas Green replaced Danny Ozark as the Phillies' manager on August 31, 1979. He won his first Gold Glove Award in 1979 and became an integral member of the Phillies defense. In 1980, Trillo hit for over a .300 batting average until the middle of September, finishing the season with a career-high .292 average as the Phillies won the National League Eastern Division title. Along with his defensive talents, he won the 1980 Silver Slugger Award for second basemen, which is awarded annually to the best offensive player at each position.

In the 1980 National League Championship Series against the Houston Astros, he posted a .381 batting average with four runs batted in, and teamed up with Bake McBride in the decisive Game 5 to relay a throw to home plate, cutting off Luis Pujols attempting to score from first base on a double by Craig Reynolds. Trillo's performance earned him the League Championship Series Most Valuable Player Award. In the 1980 World Series against the Kansas City Royals, Trillo once again made his mark in Game 5 by making another relay throw to cut off Darrell Porter trying to score in the sixth inning. He then hit a single with two outs in the ninth inning to drive home the winning run. The Phillies went on to win Game 6 and claimed the first world championship in the team's history.

1981 was another good year for Trillo as he was selected as a reserve for the National League All-Star team, and won his second Gold Glove Award and his second consecutive Silver Slugger Award however, the Phillies dropped to third place in the National League Eastern Division. He was voted to be the starting second baseman for the National League in the 1982 All-Star Game.

Trillo played 89 consecutive games overall before he committed an error, falling two games short of the Major League record 91-game errorless streak for second basemen set by Joe Morgan in the 1977 and 1978 seasons. During his streak, Trillo handled 479 consecutive chances without an error, breaking the previous Major League record of 458 set by Jerry Adair over the 1964 and 1965 seasons. His record was broken by Ryne Sandberg in 1990. Trillo committed only 5 errors during the 1982 season, setting a new National League record for second baseman with a .9937 fielding percentage. This record was also broken by Sandberg in 1990. Trillo was awarded the 1982 Gold Glove Award, marking his third Gold Glove within a four year span.

=== Later career ===
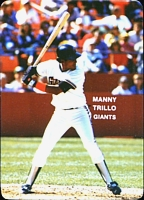
Trillo batting for the Giants in 1985

Trillo was one of five Phillies along with George Vukovich, Julio Franco, Jerry Willard and Jay Baller who were traded to the Cleveland Indians for Von Hayes at the Winter Meetings on December 9, 1982. In 1983, he made his second consecutive start as the All-Star second baseman, this time for the American League. He finished the 1983 campaign with the Montreal Expos after being dealt from Cleveland for minor-league outfielder Don Carter and cash on August 17. Trillo had expressed a desire to return to the National League and demanded a five-year $4 million contract, the latter of which the Indians lacked the wherewithal to re-sign him. At the end of the season Trillo became a free agent and signed a contract with the San Francisco Giants. In two seasons with the Giants, he produced a ,238 batting average and committed 18 errors.

After Dallas Green became the Chicago Cubs' General Manager he acquired Trillo from the Giants for Dave Owen on December 11, 1985. During his three seasons with the Cubs, Trillo played all the infield positions while serving as a utility player and helped to mentor younger Cubs players such as Ryne Sandberg and Shawon Dunston. He had a .296 batting average in 1986 along with a career-high eight home runs in 1987. Trillo was released by the Cubs after the 1988 season and signed a contract to play for the Cincinnati Reds as a utility player. After playing in 17 games, he was released by the Reds on May 25, 1989. Trillo played in his final major league game on May 20, 1989 at the age of 38.

After his playing career, Trillo worked as a minor-league coach for the Cubs and Phillies as well as the Milwaukee Brewers, New York Yankees, and the Chicago White Sox. White Sox manager, Ozzie Guillen, hired Trillo as a guest coach for the 2005 World Series.

== Career statistics ==
In a seventeen-year major league career, Trillo played in 1,780 games, accumulating 1,562 hits in 5,950 at bats for a .263 career batting average along with 61 home runs,571 runs batted in and a .316 on-base percentage. He ended his career with a .981 fielding percentage. A four-time All-Star, Trillo was a three-time Gold Glove winner and a two-time Silver Slugger Award winner. He led National League second basemen four times in assists, three times in range factor and twice in putouts.

G	AB	H	2B	3B	HR	R	RBI	BB	IBB	SO	SH	SF	HBP	AVG	OBP	SLG	FLD%
1,780	5,950	1,562	239	33	61	598	571	452	35	742	88	49	34	.263	.316	.345	.981

== Venezuelan professional baseball ==
Like many Venezuelan baseball players of his era, Trillo returned to Venezuela during the off-season to play in the Venezuelan Professional Baseball League. As a member of the Leones del Caracas, he won the Venezuelan League's Rookie of the Year award in the 1971-1972 winter season. In the 1972-1973 season, he played a large role in helping the Leones win the league championship and advance to the 1973 Caribbean Series where they eventually lost to the Tigres del Licey from the Dominican Republic. In the 1979-1980 season, Trillo hit .306 in 30 games to help Caracas to win its third title in eight seasons. In the 1980 Caribbean Series held in Santo Domingo, Dominican Republic, Caracas would tie for second place with the Vaqueros de Bayamón of the Puerto Rican League as the Tigres del Licey were the champions.

Trillo was involved in a salary dispute with the Leones during the 1980-1981 season which led to him being traded to the Águilas del Zulia in one of the most impactful trades in Venezuelan professional baseball history. Trillo became a team leader for the Águilas, helping the team win reach the league playoff finals in 1981 and 1982. He was also a liaison between the Chicago Cubs and the Águilas in Venezuela, helping the Cubs develop prospects in winter baseball. Trillo was a member of the Águilas team that won the 1984 Caribbean Series in San Juan, Puerto Rico. He played his final season in the Venezuelan League as the player–manager for the Águilas during the 1987-1988 winter season. In 1988 Trillo became a full-time coach for the Águilas.

== Awards & honors ==
In 2007, Trillo was inducted into the Venezuelan Baseball Hall of Fame and Museum. In 1983, he was named to the Philadelphia Phillies Centennial Team as its second baseman. In 2020, he was selected for enshrinement on the Philadelphia Baseball Wall of Fame.

== See also ==
- List of players from Venezuela in Major League Baseball
- List of Gold Glove Award winners at second base
- List of Silver Slugger Award winners at second base
