= 1980 National League Championship Series =

12th edition of Major League Baseball's National League Championship Series

Team (Wins)	Managers	Season
Philadelphia Phillies (3)	Dallas Green	91–71, .562, GA: 1
Houston Astros (2)	Bill Virdon	93–70, .571, GA: 1
- Dates: October 7–12
- MVP: Manny Trillo (Philadelphia)
- Umpires: Bob Engel; Terry Tata; Bruce Froemming; Doug Harvey; Ed Vargo (crew chief); Jerry Crawford

Broadcast
- Television: ABC; WPHL-TV (PHI); KRIV-TV (HOU)
- TV announcers: ABC: Keith Jackson, Don Drysdale and Howard Cosell; WPHL-TV: Harry Kalas, Andy Musser, Richie Ashburn and Tim McCarver; KRIV-TV: Gene Elston, Dewayne Staats and Larry Dierker
- Radio: CBS; KYW (PHI); KPRC (HOU)
- Radio announcers: CBS: Jack Buck and Jerry Coleman; KYW: Harry Kalas, Andy Musser, Richie Ashburn, Tim McCarver and Chris Wheeler; KPRC: Gene Elston, Dewayne Staats and Larry Dierker

The 1980 National League Championship Series was a best-of-five playoff in Major League Baseball’s 1980 postseason between the Philadelphia Phillies and the Houston Astros for the National League (NL) pennant and the right to play in the 1980 World Series. Played from October 7 to 12, it was the 12th NLCS. Philadelphia won the series three games to two to clinch the NL pennant. It was the first postseason series victory in franchise history for the Phillies, who went on to defeat the Kansas City Royals for their first World Series Championship.

The 1980 National League Championship Series is remembered as the closest, most grueling playoff series in Major League Baseball history. The series went to its five-game limit, with the final four games requiring extra innings to determine a winner.

The two franchises would meet again in the 2022 World Series, nine years after the Astros switched to the American League.

== Background ==
The 1980 National League pennant race was one of the most exciting races in baseball history, as both divisions came down to the final weekend. The NL East race featured the Pirates, the defending World Series Champions; the Phillies, who were hovering just over a .500 winning percentage and in third place until the middle of August; and the Expos, who were leading the division or within at least four games of first place throughout most of the season. The Pirates would fade at the end of the season and finish 83–79. The Phillies and the Expos were tied in the standings entering the final weekend of the 1980 season with a three game series set between the two clubs at Olympic Stadium (Montreal). On October 4, with the Phillies holding a one-game lead in the standings, and with the score tied at four heading to the tenth, Mike Schmidt hit a blast deep into the seats in left field to give the Phillies a 6–4 lead and ultimate win. The win clinched the NL East for the Phillies and prevented a winner-take-all Game 162 with the Expos for the divisional crown the following day. This was the fourth appearance for the Phillies in the NLCS (having previously appeared in 1976, 1977, 1978).

The two parties in the NL West race were the Astros and Dodgers. The Astros were a very talented team with the additions of Joe Morgan and Nolan Ryan during the off-season, but a stroke to ace pitcher J.R. Richard in late July and inner turmoil threatened to tear the team apart. In his book, Joe Morgan – A Life in Baseball, Morgan recounted how he called a players-only meeting in August after a series against the Padres in San Diego. He challenged his teammates to be less selfish and he singled people out and it worked. Immediately following the meeting, Houston went on a tear and gained a three game lead in the NL West. Everyone was happy, according to Morgan, except manager Bill Virdon, who felt Morgan had overstepped his bounds. Their relationship changed after that. As the team continued to surge, players would talk about how much of an influence Morgan was which made the problem worse. Virdon began benching Morgan late in games and it would come back to bite them later on. While the Phillies were putting their finishing touches on clinching the NL East during the last weekend of the season, the Astros had a meltdown at Dodger Stadium. All Houston had to do was win one game and they would qualify for their first ever post-season appearance; instead, they were swept in three games by the second-place Dodgers to force a one game playoff the next day.

More than 50,000 people packed Dodger Stadium on October 6 for the one-game playoff to determine the NL West champion. The Astros sent 19-game winner Joe Niekro to the mound, while the Dodgers countered with Dave Goltz that saw Houston knock Goltz out the game early and go on to win 7–1 to set up the first ever postseason series for Houston in team history.

== Rosters ==
=== Philadelphia Phillies ===
Ramón Avilés, Bob Boone, Larry Bowa, Warren Brusstar, Marty Bystrom, Steve Carlton, Larry Christenson, Greg Gross, Greg Luzinski, Garry Maddox, Bake McBride, Tug McGraw, Keith Moreland, Dickie Noles, Ron Reed, Pete Rose, Dick Ruthven, Kevin Saucier, Mike Schmidt, Lonnie Smith, Manny Trillo, Del Unser, George Vukovich.

=== Houston Astros ===
Joaquín Andújar, Alan Ashby, Dave Bergman, Bruce Bochy, Enos Cabell, César Cedeño, José Cruz, Ken Forsch, Danny Heep, Art Howe, Frank LaCorte, Rafael Landestoy, Jeffrey Leonard, Joe Morgan, Joe Niekro, Terry Puhl, Luis Pujols, Craig Reynolds, Vern Ruhle, Nolan Ryan, Joe Sambito, Dave Smith, Denny Walling, Gary Woods.

== Summary ==
=== Houston Astros vs. Philadelphia Phillies ===
Philadelphia won the series, 3–2.

Game	Date	Score	Location	Time	Attendance
1	October 7	Houston Astros – 1, Philadelphia Phillies – 3	Veterans Stadium	2:35	65,277
2	October 8	Houston Astros – 7, Philadelphia Phillies – 4 (10)	Veterans Stadium	3:34	65,476
3	October 10	Philadelphia Phillies – 0, Houston Astros – 1 (11)	Astrodome	3:22	44,443
4	October 11	Philadelphia Phillies – 5, Houston Astros – 3 (10)	Astrodome	3:55	44,952
5	October 12	Philadelphia Phillies – 8, Houston Astros – 7 (10)	Astrodome	3:38	44,802

== Game summaries ==
=== Game 1 ===
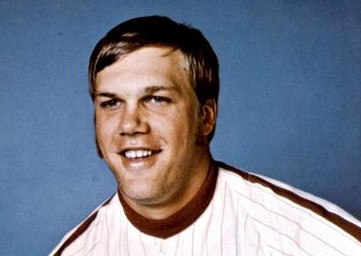
Greg Luzinski hit the only home run of the entire NLCS to score the go-ahead run in the Game 1 victory.

October 7, 1980 8:15 pm (ET) at Veterans Stadium in Philadelphia, Pennsylvania 55 °F (13 °C), partly cloudy
Team	1	2	3	4	5	6	7	8	9	R	H	E
Houston	0	0	1	0	0	0	0	0	0	1	7	0
Philadelphia	0	0	0	0	0	2	1	0	X	3	8	1
WP: Steve Carlton (1–0) LP: Ken Forsch (0–1) Sv: Tug McGraw (1); Home runs: HOU: None; PHI: Greg Luzinski (1)

The 1980 NLCS featured Joe Morgan on the Astros and Pete Rose on the Phillies, the leadoff and 2-hole hitters in the Big Red Machine batting line-up, who dominated baseball for much of the 1970s.

Game 1 was the most ordinary contest of the series. Starters Ken Forsch and Steve Carlton dueled for the first five innings, with only one run scored by Houston in the third on an RBI single by Gary Woods. Philadelphia's Greg Luzinski essentially decided the game in the sixth when he homered after Pete Rose had singled. This was the only home run of the entire series. The Phillies added another run in the seventh on a run-scoring single by pinch-hitter Greg Gross. Tug McGraw relieved Carlton at the start of the eighth and allowed only a walk during the last two innings for the save. Despite pitching fairly well in a complete game effort, Forsch took the loss.

The Astros arrived in Philadelphia only hours before the first pitch after defeating the Los Angeles Dodgers at Dodger Stadium in a one-game playoff the previous afternoon to win the Western Division championship.

This was the first home postseason win for the Phillies since the Game 1 of the 1915 World Series, ending a ten-game home postseason losing streak.

=== Game 2 ===
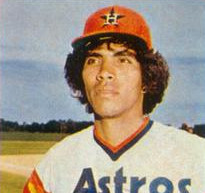
José Cruz gave the Astros the go-ahead run in the 10th inning to start a barrage of four runs as the Astros pulled away to even the series.

October 8, 1980 8:15 pm (ET) at Veterans Stadium in Philadelphia, Pennsylvania 63 °F (17 °C), clear
Team	1	2	3	4	5	6	7	8	9	10	R	H	E
Houston	0	0	1	0	0	0	1	1	0	4	7	8	1
Philadelphia	0	0	0	2	0	0	0	1	0	1	4	14	2
WP: Frank LaCorte (1–0) LP: Ron Reed (0–1) Sv: Joaquín Andújar (1)

Houston evened the series in Game 2, a seesaw contest that would prove typical of the series as a whole. Houston opened the scoring in the third when Terry Puhl singled home Craig Reynolds after a sacrifice bunt by Nolan Ryan. The Phillies took the lead with two runs in the fourth on RBIs from Greg Luzinski and Garry Maddox. Houston evened the score in the seventh when Ryan walked and was doubled home by Puhl and went ahead in the eighth after Joe Morgan doubled and scored on a single by José Cruz.

After loading the bases in the seventh but failing to score, the Phillies got a run in the eighth to tie the game 3–3 when Maddox singled home pinch-runner Lonnie Smith. The Astros went 1–2–3 in the ninth, and the Phillies were in prime position to take a 2–0 series lead after loaded the bases with one out in their half of the inning on singles by Bake McBride, Mike Schmidt and Smith. But Manny Trillo, who would eventually win the series MVP award, struck out and Maddox fouled out to end the threat.

The tenth inning turned disastrous for the Phillies. With Ron Reed trying to get his second inning of work in relief, Terry Puhl started off the tenth with a leadoff single before Enos Cabell sacrificed to get Puhl to second on a bunt. Joe Morgan was intentionally walked (which in turn led him to be taken out for a pinch-runner) to set up Cruz at the plate. He lined a single to right field that scored Puhl to give the Astros the lead, with Cruz even advancing to second base on a fielding error. With runners on second and third, César Cedeño hit into a fielder's choice that saw him beat out the throw and score another run. Dave Bergman then lined a triple to right to score two more runs and give the Astros a 7-3 lead. Frank LaCorte started off the bottom of the 10th by allowing a hit and walking a batter before being taken out for Joaquín Andújar in relief. This was followed by a flyball out before an error at shortstop on a groundout led to a run; Andújar walked a batter to set up Mike Schmidt as the tying run at the plate. He proceeded to hit a flyball (on a 3–0 count) that was caught to end the game and tie the series at 1–1.

=== Game 3 ===
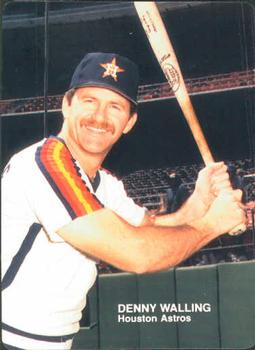
Denny Walling hit a flyball deep enough to score the only run in Game 3 to get Houston one win away from the pennant.

October 10, 1980 2:00 pm (CT) at Astrodome in Houston, Texas 73 °F (23 °C), dome
Team	1	2	3	4	5	6	7	8	9	10	11	R	H	E
Philadelphia	0	0	0	0	0	0	0	0	0	0	0	0	7	1
Houston	0	0	0	0	0	0	0	0	0	0	1	1	6	1
WP: Dave Smith (1–0) LP: Tug McGraw (0–1)

Houston's Astrodome was always known as a pitcher's park, and the domed stadium lived up to its reputation when the series moved there for Game 3. The two teams' pitching staffs combined to yield only 13 hits and one run in the game's 11 innings. Houston's Joe Niekro pitched ten strong innings but missed out on what would have been a win, while Phillies closer Tug McGraw took the loss. Both teams did get men to third on a few occasions: Houston in the first and fourth and Philadelphia in the third. But the staffs held firm until the bottom of the 11th. Joe Morgan led off the inning for the Astros with a triple to right. After two intentional walks, Denny Walling hit a sacrifice fly to bring home the game's only run and give Houston a 2–1 series lead and one win away from the franchise's first appearance in the World Series.

=== Game 4 ===
October 11, 1980 3:15 pm (CT) at Astrodome in Houston, Texas 73 °F (23 °C), dome
Team	1	2	3	4	5	6	7	8	9	10	R	H	E
Philadelphia	0	0	0	0	0	0	0	3	0	2	5	13	0
Houston	0	0	0	1	1	0	0	0	1	0	3	5	1
WP: Warren Brusstar (1–0) LP: Joe Sambito (0–1) Sv: Tug McGraw (2)

In what was by now a familiar pattern, Game 4 turned into a back-and-forth contest that wasn't decided until extra innings.

The fourth inning of this game was especially eventful. In the top, Bake McBride and Manny Trillo opened with back-to-back singles off Vern Ruhle. Garry Maddox then hit a low liner back to the mound that Ruhle reached down and appeared to catch (replays were inconclusive). Plate umpire Doug Harvey at first made no call on the play due to his view being blocked by Maddox. Ruhle threw to first baseman Art Howe to either double off Trillo or retire Maddox (according to the call) and Harvey asked for a ruling from first-base umpire Bob Engel. Engel ruled a catch, meaning Maddox was out and Trillo was doubled off. Howe, seeing McBride at third base, then ran down and touched second for an apparent triple play and the Astros left the field as the inning was apparently over. Phillies manager Dallas Green and the Phillie infielders (especially Pete Rose) heatedly protested that Ruhle trapped the ball, but the call was not changed. Harvey allowed McBride to return to second, determining that his original hesitation and conferring with Engel caused McBride to run to third. Astros manager Bill Virdon protested the decision to declare only two outs and McBride on second, but to no avail. The umpires then consulted with National League President Chub Feeney, who was seated in the first row behind home plate, and Feeney agreed with the ruling. Green and the Phillies then resumed their heated disagreement, and both the Phillies and the Astros decided to play the game under protest. After a total of 20 minutes' worth of arguing from both sides, Larry Bowa grounded out for the third out of the inning. Neither teams' protest was upheld by Feeney.

The bottom of the fourth featured two fielding gaffes by Phillie left-fielder Lonnie Smith as the Astros got their first run. Enos Cabell doubled to left on what appeared to be a catchable fly ball. Smith mistakenly turned to face the left field wall as if the ball would carom, but the ball instead dropped on the warning track a few feet away from him. After Joe Morgan grounded Cabell to third, Gary Woods walked. Howe then hit a fly ball to left that Smith caught as both runners tagged. As Smith attempted to throw home to retire Cabell, the ball slipped from his hand and Cabell scored. Woods reached second and attempted to advance to third on the miscue, but Smith recovered the ball and threw him out on a close play as the Astros protested once again.

The Astros got another run in the fifth as Luis Pujols tripled and scored on a single by Rafael Landestoy. They now led 2–0, but in what would prove to be critical failings, the Astros loaded the bases in both the sixth and seventh but couldn't add to their lead. In the sixth, a run for the Astros was taken off the board when Woods left third base too early on a sacrifice fly attempt and the Phillies successfully appealed.

The Phillies took advantage by going ahead with three runs in the eighth, ending a scoreless string of 18 consecutive innings in the Astrodome. Pinch-hitter Greg Gross and Smith opened the inning with singles off Ruhle. Rose singled to right, scoring Gross. Right fielder Jeff Leonard threw to third, trying to tag Smith out, but Smith made it safely while Rose took second. Mike Schmidt then hit a grounder up the middle, scoring Smith to tie it and reaching first when Joe Morgan fielded but was hesitant and did not make a throw, as Rose took third. After McBride was struck out by Joe Sambito, Trillo hit a sinking line drive that Leonard made a shoestring catch on for the second out. Rose tagged and scored from third to put the Phillies ahead 3–2 as Leonard's throw home was offline. However, Schmidt thought Leonard trapped Trillo's hit and had taken second and was doubled off first by catcher Bruce Bochy to end the inning. A throw by Leonard to first may have beaten Schmidt and ended the inning before Rose crossed the plate.

The Astros didn't go quietly and leveled the score in the bottom of the ninth on an RBI single by Terry Puhl. But the tenth was ruinous for Houston. With two out and the score tied at 3–3, the Phillies' Greg Luzinski entered as a pinch-hitter and doubled home Rose with the go-ahead run on a close play at the plate, with Rose running over Bochy at home plate. Manny Trillo then singled home Luzinski with an insurance tally. The Astros went 1–2–3 in the bottom of the tenth, and the series was tied. This was Luzinski's second game-winning hit in the Championship Series, coming after a subpar regular season for the slugger.

Game 4 of the series was a Saturday afternoon affair that ran into the early evening of October 11. An NCAA football game between the University of Houston and Texas A&M had been scheduled to begin at 7:00 p.m. Rather than move the game to a different day or to another stadium, the schools elected to play the game at the Astrodome as scheduled. The conversion of the Astrodome from baseball to football took several hours and the football game did not kick off until 11:33 p.m. The game ended at 2:41 a.m. with the Houston Cougars taking a 17–13 victory over Texas A&M. The Astrodome crew then began work on converting the Dome back to a baseball setup for Game 5 of the NLCS.

=== Game 5 ===
October 12, 1980 7:00 pm (CT) at Astrodome in Houston, Texas 73 °F (23 °C), dome
Team	1	2	3	4	5	6	7	8	9	10	R	H	E
Philadelphia	0	2	0	0	0	0	0	5	0	1	8	13	2
Houston	1	0	0	0	0	1	3	2	0	0	7	14	0
WP: Dick Ruthven (1–0) LP: Frank LaCorte (1–1)

Game 5 capped the series in fitting fashion, with seemingly endless surprises and excitement. The Astros jumped to an early lead in the first on a run-scoring double by José Cruz. Philadelphia bounced back to take the lead on a two-run single by Bob Boone in the second after Houston passed on intentionally walking him with first base open with runners on second and third to pitch to the opposing pitcher Marty Bystrom. The Astros saw Luis Pujols and Enos Cabell thrown out at the plate in the second and fifth, but finally broke through to tie the game at 2 on an unearned run in the sixth, due to an error by Philadelphia's LF Greg Luzinski.

Houston took what seemed like a solid 5–2 lead in the seventh on an RBI single by Denny Walling, a wild pitch from Phillies reliever Larry Christenson, and a run-scoring triple by Art Howe. A three-run deficit in the eighth inning against Nolan Ryan seemed insurmountable. But facing elimination down to their last six outs for the second consecutive game, the Phillies would not quit. They loaded the bases with nobody out on three straight singles, including Bob Boone’s infield hit on a come-backer off Ryan’s glove (if fielded cleanly, it likely would've been a double play), and a bunt single by Greg Gross. Two runs came in on a bases-loaded walk to Pete Rose and a fielder’s choice by Keith Moreland. After Mike Schmidt struck out looking with runners on the corners, an RBI single by Del Unser tied the game at 5, and then series MVP Manny Trillo put the Phillies ahead 7–5 with a two-run triple.

The Astros promptly came back to tie the game in the bottom of the eighth, with Rafael Landestoy and José Cruz each singling in a run. Neither team scored in the ninth, but the Phillies got doubles from Unser and Garry Maddox in the tenth to take an 8–7 lead. Despite ABC's short transmitter difficulties that same inning, Philadelphia's Dick Ruthven retired the Astros in order in the bottom of the tenth, with the last out being a soft liner to Maddox to end the game. The Phillies had won their first pennant since 1950, and won their first postseason series in six attempts. Philadelphia went on to defeat the Kansas City Royals four games to two in the World Series.

== Composite box ==
1980 NLCS (3–2): Philadelphia Phillies over Houston Astros

Team	1	2	3	4	5	6	7	8	9	10	11	R	H	E
Philadelphia Phillies	0	2	0	2	0	2	1	9	0	4	0	20	55	6
Houston Astros	1	0	2	1	1	1	4	3	1	4	1	19	40	3
Total attendance: 264,950 Average attendance: 52,990

== Aftermath ==
The 1980 NL Championship Series is widely regarded as one of the most exciting postseason series in baseball history. The last four of its five games went into extra innings, which is the most extra-inning games of any post-season series. Four of its games featured lead changes, while the one game that did not go 11 innings and ended in a 1–0 Houston victory. "I've never been through such excitement in all my life," said Astros’ outfielder José Cruz after the winner-take-all Game 5. Terry Puhl added, "Everybody thought we [Astros] were a team of destiny. They were wrong. The Phillies were a team of destiny in this series." The Phillies would go on the win their first World Series in franchise history, becoming the last original National League team to win a Fall Classic.

The Astros could have possibly won this series and their first championship if J.R. Richard, one of baseball's dominant pitchers of the late 1970s, had not suffered a stroke in the middle of the season. In 1981, Richard attempted a comeback with the Astros, however, this failed because the stroke had slowed down his reaction time and weakened his depth perception. He spent the next few seasons in the minor leagues before being released by the Astros in 1984. After his professional baseball career ended, Richard became involved in unsuccessful business deals and went through two divorces, which led to him being homeless and destitute in 1994. Richard found solace in a local church and later became a Christian minister. He was inducted into the Negro League Hall of Fame in 2018 and the Astros inaugural Hall of Fame in 2019. Richard died in 2021 due to complications from COVID-19.

1980 represented Joe Morgan's only year with Houston during his second tenure with the team. For much of 1980, Morgan bristled with team manager Bill Virdon at being taken out in late innings for Rafael Landestoy. Sealing his fate, Morgan expressed that he did not want to play for the Astros as long as Bill Virdon was the manager. Morgan signed with the San Francisco Giants after the season and found his way to the Phillies to team with former Big Red Machine teammates Pete Rose and Tony Perez in 1983. Virdon was eventually fired in 1982 after a poor start to the season.

Then-Astros catcher Bruce Bochy was the manager of the San Francisco Giants in 2010 when his team beat the Philadelphia Phillies 30 years later in the NL Championship Series. Bochy was behind the plate for Houston in Game 4 of the 1980 NL Championship Series versus Philadelphia when Pete Rose ran him over to score the go-ahead run in the top of the tenth inning.

The Astros had to wait 25 years before they would finally make their first World Series appearance in 2005, where they lost to the Chicago White Sox in a four game sweep. By 2013, the Astros had moved to the American League and they would not win a World Series until they beat the Los Angeles Dodgers in 2017. The Astros would win again in 2022, avenging their 1980 NL Championship Series loss by beating the Phillies in the World Series in six games.
