= Gorman Thomas =

American baseball player (born 1950)

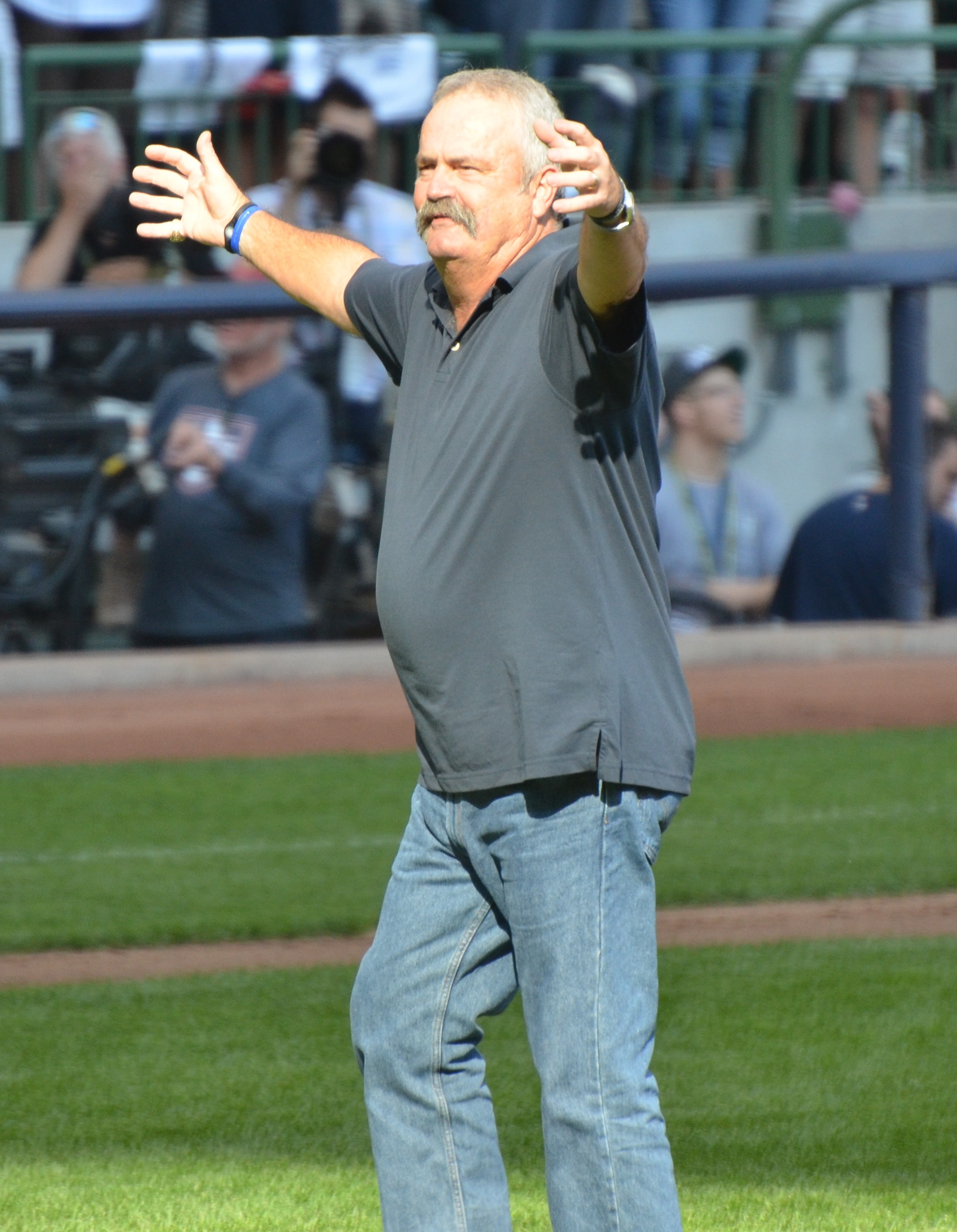
- Thomas after throwing out the ceremonial first pitch before Game 1 of the 2011 NLCS
- Center fielder
- Born: December 12, 1950 (age 75); Charleston, South Carolina, U.S.
- Batted: Right Threw: Right

MLB debut
- April 6, 1973, for the Milwaukee Brewers

Last MLB appearance
- October 5, 1986, for the Milwaukee Brewers

MLB statistics
- Batting average: .225
- Home runs: 268
- Runs batted in: 782
- Stats at Baseball Reference

Teams
- Milwaukee Brewers (1973–1976, 1978–1983); Cleveland Indians (1983); Seattle Mariners (1984–1986); Milwaukee Brewers (1986)

Career highlights and awards
- All-Star (1981); 2× AL home run leader (1979, 1982); Milwaukee Brewers Wall of Honor; American Family Field Walk of Fame

James Gorman Thomas III (born December 12, 1950) is an American former professional baseball player. He played Major League Baseball (MLB) as a center fielder and right-handed hitter. Thomas played in the American League (AL) with the Milwaukee Brewers (1973–76, 1978–83, 1986), Cleveland Indians (1983) and Seattle Mariners (1984–86).

With the Brewers, Thomas was one of the franchise's most popular players. He was a leading home run hitter in the late 1970s and early 1980s, though he hit for a low batting average and frequently struck out. Thomas had good fielding skills and his throwing arm was strong until shoulder surgery in 1984, after which he became a designated hitter until his retirement in 1986.

== Early life ==
Thomas was born in Charleston, South Carolina. His father, Gorman Sr, was a postal worker and a former minor league pitcher. Thomas was raised in nearby James Island. His family moved to Columbia, South Carolina where he attended Cardinal Newman High School through his junior year, playing on a state championship basketball team in 1968. He attended James Island High School his senior year. In high school, Thomas earned 14 letters in four sports - baseball, football, basketball and track. He was selected in the first round (21st overall) of the 1969 Major League Baseball draft by the Seattle Pilots, becoming the first-ever draft pick in the history of the team.

== Career ==
=== Milwaukee Brewers ===
1981 photo of Thomas for Milwaukee Brewers

In 1971, Thomas played Class A baseball in the Milwaukee system with the Danville Warriors that year. Thomas led the Midwest League in both home runs (31) and strikeouts (170). The next year with the Class AA San Antonio Brewers, Thomas led the Texas League in the same two categories, registering 26 home runs and 171 strikeouts in 135 games.

Thomas spent parts of 1973 and 1974 in the major leagues with the Brewers, but he mostly played Class AAA baseball during those seasons. With the Sacramento Solons of the Pacific Coast League in 1974, Thomas finished second in the league in home runs (51), third in RBI (122), fourth in walks (93), third in runs scored (117) and first in strikeouts (175). He spent most of the next two years on the bench with the Brewers, but he enjoyed being teammates with Hank Aaron during Aaron's last two MLB seasons.

Thomas played in Class AAA with the Spokane Indians for the entire 1977 season, batting .322 with 36 home runs and 114 RBI in 143 games. After the season, Thomas was traded to the Texas Rangers as the player to be named later in an earlier trade for Ed Kirkpatrick. Rangers executive Dan O'Brien Sr. explained the move as a temporary "friendship deal". Brewers general manager Harry Dalton needed to open up a roster spot over the winter, and he asked O'Brien to hold Thomas on the Texas roster for a few months. In February 1978, O'Brien sold Thomas back to Milwaukee before he appeared in any games with the Rangers.

Becoming an everyday center fielder for the Brewers in 1978, Thomas batted .246 with 32 home runs and 86 RBI in 137 games. In 1979, Thomas enjoyed his best MLB season, compiling career high numbers in home runs (45, first in the AL), RBI (123), runs scored (97), hits (136), doubles (29), walks (98), on-base percentage (.356), total bases (300), slugging percentage (.539) and OPS (.895). After the season, he finished seventh in MVP Award voting. Thomas was affectionately known as "Stormin' Gorman."

In 1980, Thomas had another productive season, batting .239 with 38 home runs and 105 RBI while playing in all 162 games. Gorman followed that up by finishing second in the AL in home runs with 21 and being named to the AL All-Star Team in 1981. He finished eighth in MVP Award voting that year. In 1982, Thomas hit .245 with an AL-high 39 home runs (tying with Reggie Jackson for the league lead), and he recorded 112 RBI to help the Brewers win the American League East. The Brewers went on to win the ALCS and face the Cardinals in the World Series, where they lost to the Cardinals in seven games, with Thomas striking out against Bruce Sutter to end the Series.

While with the Brewers, Thomas opened a bar in Milwaukee with pitcher Pete Vuckovich. It was called "Stormin' & Vuke's", a play on their nicknames.

=== Trade to the Indians ===
Thomas was dealt along with Jamie Easterly and Ernie Camacho from the Brewers to the Cleveland Indians for Rick Manning and Rick Waits on June 6, 1983. Thomas's play had declined late in the 1982 season; he hit .181 after September 1, and he had only four hits in 41 at bats (.098) in the 1982 postseason. After the announcement of the trade, angry Brewers fans flooded the team's switchboard with phone calls criticizing the transaction.

After the 1983 season, Thomas expressed his desire for another trade, saying that he did not feel comfortable playing in Cleveland. In 1983, he batted a combined .209 with 22 home runs and 69 RBI in 152 games with Milwaukee and Cleveland. Thomas had hit more home runs during the period from 1978 to 1983 than any other player in the AL (197).

=== Later career ===
On December 7, 1983, Thomas was traded to the Seattle Mariners alongside Jack Perconte in exchange for Tony Bernazard. Thomas played in only 35 games for Mariners in 1984, batting just .157 with a home run and 13 RBI before he underwent season-ending rotator cuff surgery in June. In spring training before the 1985 season, Thomas had some difficulty with the timing of his swing, but he was able to swing without pain and he was looking forward to assuming Seattle's designated hitter role. Thomas was selected as The Sporting News AL Comeback Player of the Year in 1985, as he became the first player in Mariners history to hit 30 home runs in a season. He finished the season batting .215 with 32 home runs and 87 RBI in 135 games. However, Thomas began to feel alienated from his teammates. At a team tenth anniversary party, Thomas was left out of a 1985 Mariners highlight video. Mariners executives said they tried to trade him away but that there was minimal interest in Thomas because of his age and his limitation to the designated hitter role.

After Dick Williams took over as the manager in Seattle toward the beginning of the 1986 season, Thomas saw decreased playing time. By late June, he was hitting .194 with 10 home runs and 26 RBI in 57 games, and the team decided to release him. Thomas was making $650,000 that season and Mariners owner George Argyros had to absorb the loss of $361,000 that was still owed to Thomas under that contract. Thomas contemplated retirement, and he turned down a contract offer from the Detroit Tigers, but he signed with the Brewers a couple of weeks later to fill a designated hitter and pinch hitter role.

Thomas retired after the 1986 season. He was a career .225 hitter (.324 on-base percentage) with 268 home runs and 782 RBI in 1,435 games.

== Later life ==
In retirement, Thomas played amateur golf and spent time hunting and carving duck decoys. In the early 1990s, he collected limited-edition prints and considered opening an art gallery. Thomas works under a personal services contract with the Brewers to make appearances in the community and welcome visitors to Gorman's Grill at American Family Field. He was elected to the Wisconsin Athletic Hall of Fame in 2003.

== See also ==
- List of Major League Baseball career home run leaders
- List of Major League Baseball annual home run leaders
