= Jamie Easterly =

American baseball player (born 1953)

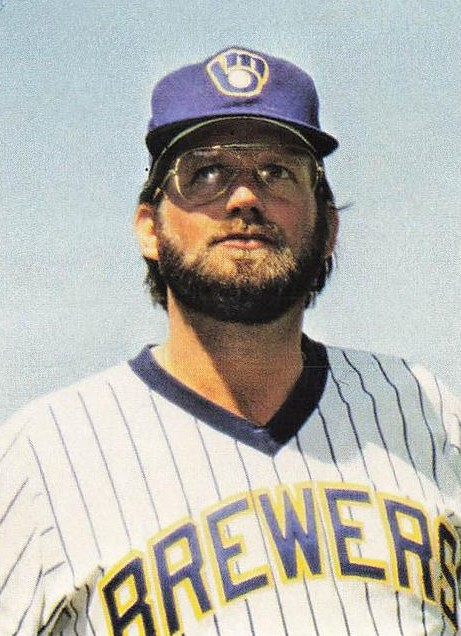
- Pitcher
- Born: February 17, 1953 (age 73); Houston, Texas, U.S.
- Batted: Left Threw: Left

MLB debut
- April 6, 1974, for the Atlanta Braves

Last MLB appearance
- October 2, 1987, for the Cleveland Indians

MLB statistics
- Win–loss record: 23–33
- Earned run average: 4.62
- Strikeouts: 350
- Stats at Baseball Reference

Teams
- Atlanta Braves (1974–1979); Milwaukee Brewers (1981–1983); Cleveland Indians (1983–1987)

James Morris Easterly (born February 17, 1953) is an American former professional baseball pitcher who played in the major leagues for the Atlanta Braves (1974–79), Milwaukee Brewers (1981–83) and Cleveland Indians (1983–87).

On June 30, 1978, he gave up Willie McCovey's 500th home run.

Easterly was a member of the Brewers' 1981 American League Eastern Division (2nd half) and 1982 AL pennant winning teams. He was traded along with Gorman Thomas and Ernie Camacho from the Brewers to the Indians for Rick Manning and Rick Waits on June 6, 1983.

He was released by the Cleveland Indians following the 1987 season, at which point he announced his retirement.

== Sources ==
- Career statistics from MLB · Baseball Reference · Baseball Reference (Minors) · Retrosheet · Baseball Almanac
