= Julio Franco =

Dominican baseball player (born 1958)

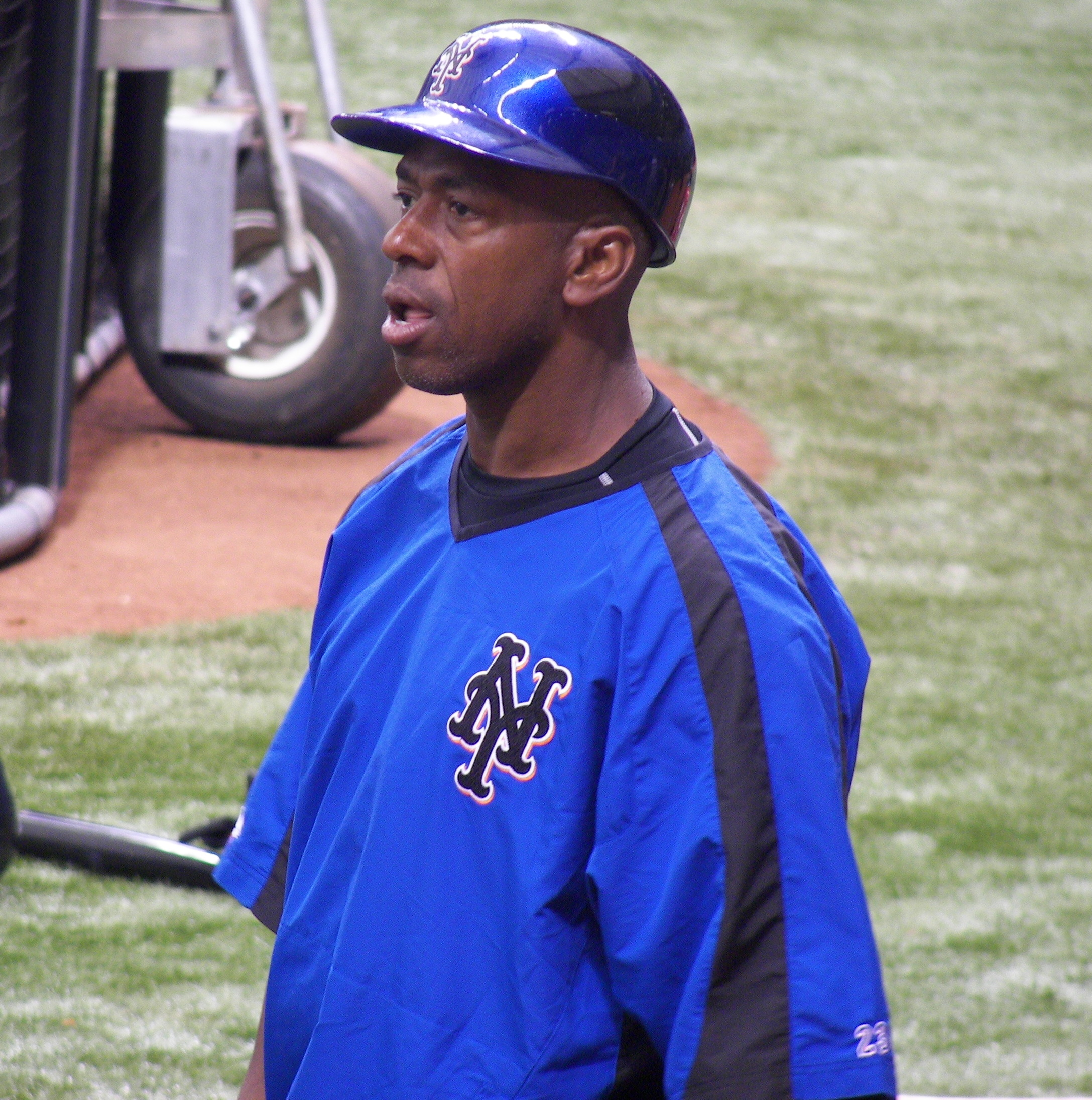
- Franco with the New York Mets in 2007
- Infielder / Designated hitter
- Born: August 23, 1958 (age 68); Hato Mayor del Rey, Dominican Republic
- Batted: Right Threw: Right

Professional debut
- MLB: April 23, 1982, for the Philadelphia Phillies
- NPB: April 1, 1995, for the Chiba Lotte Marines

Last appearance
- NPB: October 11, 1998, for the Chiba Lotte Marines
- MLB: September 17, 2007, for the Atlanta Braves

MLB statistics
- Batting average: .298
- Hits: 2,586
- Home runs: 173
- Runs batted in: 1,194

NPB statistics
- Batting average: .298
- Home runs: 28
- Runs batted in: 135

KBO statistics
- Batting average: .327
- Home runs: 22
- Runs batted in: 110
- Stats at Baseball Reference

Teams
- Philadelphia Phillies (1982); Cleveland Indians (1983–1988); Texas Rangers (1989–1993); Chicago White Sox (1994); Chiba Lotte Marines (1995); Cleveland Indians (1996–1997); Milwaukee Brewers (1997); Chiba Lotte Marines (1998); Tampa Bay Devil Rays (1999); Samsung Lions (2000); Atlanta Braves (2001–2005); New York Mets (2006–2007); Atlanta Braves (2007)

Career highlights and awards
- MLB: 3× All-Star (1989–1991); 5× Silver Slugger Award (1988–1991, 1994); AL batting champion (1991); NPB: 2× All-Star (1995, 1998); Golden Glove Award (1995); 2× Best Nine Award (1995, 1998)

Julio César Franco Robles (born August 23, 1958) (Note: Franco's birth date is in question. Many of his early bios and cards have his birthday listed in 1954, and on the roster of the Quintana Roo Tigres, his birthday is listed in 1961.) is a Dominican former professional baseball infielder and coach. He spent most of his playing career in Major League Baseball (MLB), entering the major leagues in 1982 and last appearing in 2007, at which time he was the oldest active big league player. During that stretch, Franco also spent two seasons playing in Nippon Professional Baseball (NPB) and one season playing in the KBO.

While Franco was an All-Star and posted above-average hitting statistics throughout his career, he is best known for being the oldest regular position player in MLB history and the oldest player to hit a home run in Major League history, having hit his last home run on May 4, 2007 at 48 years and 254 days old. Franco was the all-time hits leader among Dominican-born players until surpassed in 2011 by Vladimir Guerrero. He made his MLB debut as a shortstop for the Philadelphia Phillies. During his long career, Franco saw significant time as a shortstop, second baseman, first baseman, and designated hitter. At the time of his final game, he was the last MLB player born in the 1950s.

== Early life ==
Franco was born in Hato Mayor in the Dominican Republic. As a child, he lived in Consuelo, San Pedro de Macorís, a poor municipality 50 miles east of Santo Domingo. He attended Divine Providence School in Consuelo.

== Career ==
=== Minor league career ===
Signed by the Philadelphia Phillies organization on April 23, 1978, as an amateur free agent, Franco reported to the Rookie-level Butte Copper Kings. In each of five minor league seasons, he hit for a batting average of at least .300. Franco was promoted through the Philadelphia minor league system each year, reaching the Class AAA Oklahoma City 89ers in 1982 and batting .300 and hitting 21 home runs in 120 games.

=== Early MLB career ===
Franco debuted in the major leagues in 1982, playing 16 games with the Phillies. He was one of five Phillies along with Manny Trillo, George Vukovich, Jerry Willard and Jay Baller who were traded to the Cleveland Indians for Von Hayes at the Winter Meetings on December 9, 1982.

1983 was Franco's first full season in the majors. In 149 games, he batted .273 with 153 hits. He finished second in AL Rookie of the Year voting, trailing only Ron Kittle.

In June 1986, Franco received a two-game suspension from the Indians after he arrived at the ballpark but then left before the game started. Indians manager Pat Corrales said that Franco left due to a personal problem, but he said that Franco had left without permission and that he had already been given a warning after missing a game in 1985.

Franco hit over .300 in every season from 1986 to 1989. He also averaged over 20 stolen bases per season from 1983 through 1991. When he switched from shortstop to second base in 1988, he won four straight Silver Slugger Awards. Franco batted with a long whip-like swing with the heaviest bat allowed. Because of his batting style, Franco twice led the American League in grounding into double plays and was in the top-ten in that category seven times in the 1980s. He is seventh on the all-time list in ground-ball double plays and has just over 300.

In December 1988, during baseball's Winter Meetings, Franco was traded from Cleveland to the Texas Rangers, who were in need of an everyday second baseman. The Rangers gave up first baseman Pete O'Brien, and two prospects, Oddibe McDowell and Jerry Browne. The Rangers had acquired first baseman Rafael Palmeiro the day before, and The New York Times said that the Rangers' lineup might allow Franco to bat fifth, a batting order slot that could increase his number of runs batted in (RBI).

With Texas, Franco was named to all three of his All-Star teams: in 1989, 1990 and 1991, and he won the Major League Baseball All-Star Game MVP Award in 1990. In the 1990 All-Star game, Franco came to bat in the 7th inning against Rob Dibble of the Cincinnati Reds. Franco drove a 101 mph fastball to the right-center field fence for a double, scoring the only runs of the game.

In 1991, Franco had his only 200-hit season and won the American League batting title. His Major League-leading .341 average was nine points higher than that of future Baseball Hall of Fame member Wade Boggs. A 1992 knee injury limited him to 33 games that season and fundamentally ended Franco's time as a middle infielder, playing only 35 more games at 2B the remainder of his career. Franco later said that the injury helped him to realize the importance of taking care of his physical condition. He spent 1993 as a designated hitter before opting to become a free agent and signing with the Chicago White Sox.

=== Strike and baseball abroad ===
In 1994, as a member of the Chicago White Sox, Franco had already hit 20 home runs for the only time in his career and was on pace to reach 100 runs batted in for the only time in his career when the remainder of the season was canceled by the 1994–95 Major League Baseball strike. Franco went on to win his fifth Silver Slugger Award and first as a Designated hitter. On December 28, 1994, Franco signed to play in Japan with the Chiba Lotte Marines in the Pacific League. Franco would win the Japanese equivalents of the All-MLB First Team and Gold Glove awards playing first base for the Marines in 1995.

After the 1995 season in Japan, Franco signed with the Cleveland Indians and he was once again a fan favorite. In 1996, he batted .322 with 76 RBIs even in an injury-shortened season, and played in his first postseason. Early in the 1997 season, Franco hit a hard line drive back to the pitcher's mound which struck Detroit Tigers pitcher Willie Blair; the pitcher missed four weeks of the season with a broken jaw. In August 1997, the Indians released Franco. He quickly signed with the Milwaukee Brewers.

In 1998, Franco was back in Japan playing for Chiba Lotte. The following year, he returned to North America, in the Mexican League with a .423 average in 93 games (and also a strikeout in his only MLB at bat with the Tampa Bay Devil Rays). In 2000, Franco was back in Asia but, this time, in South Korea to play for the Samsung Lions. He returned again to the Mexican League in 2001.

=== Return to the majors ===
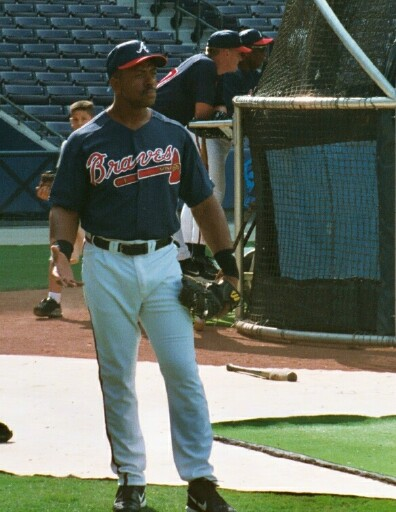
Franco with the Atlanta Braves in 2002

In September 2001, Franco was a 43-year-old who had just one major league at bat in the previous three seasons. Despite his lengthy absence, the Atlanta Braves, after seeing his success in the Mexican League, purchased his contract from the Angelopolis (Mexico City) Tigers. Franco played well defensively as a first baseman and was a good hitter against left-handed pitchers. The Braves re-signed him after that season and each of the next three.

Franco was talking in the weight room in August 2003 with Jason Marquis, when he leaned on a stand and an 80-pound weight rolled over his finger, breaking it. "When the weight started to roll," Franco said, "I said, 'Uh-oh.'"

In 2004, Franco passed Cap Anson as the oldest regularly playing position player in MLB history. (A few regularly playing pitchers, including knuckleballers Phil Niekro and Hoyt Wilhelm, were older than Franco, and Leroy “Satchel” Paige was reportedly 57, and a few non-pitchers, like Minnie Miñoso and Jim O'Rourke, appeared as publicity stunts at old ages but did not play regularly.)

On December 8, 2005, at age 47, Franco signed a two-year contract with the Mets.

Franco had been the oldest player in the major leagues from 2004 to 2007, and was the last active player who was born in the 1950s. On April 20, 2006, pinch-hitting with one out in the eighth inning against the San Diego Padres, Franco hit a go-ahead two-run home run, becoming the oldest player in Major League history to hit a home run. Franco hit a three-run homer on September 30, 2006, in Washington to extend his own record. It was one of three hits in the game for Franco, who fell a triple short of hitting for the cycle. Franco yet again bested himself on May 4, 2007, when he homered into the swimming pool at Chase Field against Arizona Diamondbacks lefty Randy Johnson — a game in which he also stole a base.

Franco was also the oldest player ever to hit a grand slam, a pinch-hit home run, two home runs in one game, and to steal two bases in a game. On April 26, 2006, Franco became the second-oldest man in MLB history to steal a base, behind only Arlie Latham, who accomplished the feat in a token appearance at age 49 with the New York Giants in 1909. On July 29, 2006, against the Atlanta Braves, Franco became the oldest player ever to pinch run, when he came in for Carlos Delgado after Delgado was hit by pitch. On September 19, 2006, a day after the Mets clinched the division title, Franco started at third base in a game against the Florida Marlins. This was Franco's first start at the position since his rookie year, marking 24 years between starts at the position.

Franco struggled with the Mets in 2007, achieving just a .200 batting average (in only 50 at-bats in half a season). Franco grew unhappy with insufficient playing time before being designated for assignment on July 12. He subsequently re-signed with the Atlanta Braves on July 18 and was placed on the team's active roster. In his first game since re-signing with the Braves, he went 1-for-3 with two RBIs and received two standing ovations in a Braves 10–1 rout of the Cardinals. On August 1, just 13 days after the Braves signed him, the Braves designated Franco for assignment after the team acquired Mark Teixeira from the Texas Rangers. He accepted a minor league assignment on August 8 and was called back up as promised on September 1.

Franco declared free agency on October 29, 2007. Franco began the 2008 season — his 31st in professional baseball — as a first baseman for the Tigres de Quintana Roo (Cancún) in the Mexican League.

=== After the Mexican League ===
On May 2, 2008, Franco officially announced his retirement from baseball to his Mexican League team, the Quintana Roo Tigers. An official announcement was released the next day. Franco said that retiring was the hardest decision he had ever made, but he pointed to his decreasing production as a player and said that he felt like it was time to retire.

Franco was hired in March 2009 as the manager of the rookie-level Gulf Coast League Mets. In Franco's only season managing the team, they posted a record of 22 wins and 34 losses. In 2010–2011, Franco managed a winter league team, the Caribes de Anzoátegui, in the Venezuelan Professional Baseball League. He led the team to its first league championship in 20 years. He returned to the team the following season, but he was fired after the team started with a 28–28 win–loss record. Soon thereafter, Franco was hired as the manager of the Pericos de Puebla for the 2012 Mexican League season. In two seasons with Puebla, he led the team to 110 wins and 104 losses.

Franco appeared on the Baseball Hall of Fame ballot in 2013. Paul White of USA Today wrote that while Franco was a consistent player over a long career, he was rarely dominant. White wrote that Franco's statistics were inferior to other Baseball Hall of Fame second basemen. Franco received six Hall of Fame votes (1.1% of the total ballots), an insufficient total to appear on the next year's ballot.

=== Return to baseball ===
On May 16, 2014, the Fort Worth Cats of United League Baseball announced that Franco had been signed for the 2014 season. He went 6-for-27 in seven games.

On February 8, 2015, Ishikawa Million Stars of the professional Japanese Independent baseball league Baseball Challenge League announced that Franco had been signed as a player-manager for the 2015 season. Franco said that he did not think he would appear often as a player, but 14 games into the season, Franco had played in ten games owing to an injury to a key player. In 25 games the 56 year old Franco tallied 24 hits and 16 RBIs slashing .312/.432/.416 (.847 OPS).

=== Second coaching stint ===
Franco was part of the coaching staff for the Lotte Giants of the KBO League from 2016–2020.

On February 5, 2022, Franco returned to the Mexican League as he was named hitting coach of the Acereros de Monclova.

== Career statistics ==
In 2,527 games over 23 major league seasons, Franco posted a .298 batting average (2,586-for-8,677) with 1,285 runs, 407 doubles, 54 triples, 173 home runs, 1,194 RBI, 281 stolen bases, 917 bases on balls, .365 on-base percentage and .417 slugging percentage. He finished his career with a .978 fielding percentage playing primarily at shortstop, second and first base. In 31 postseason games, he batted .224 (22-for-98) with nine runs, two home runs, six RBI and six walks.

== Awards and highlights ==
- Three-time All-Star (1989–1991)
- All-Star Game MVP (1990)
- Led American League in batting average (.341, 1991)
- Led AL in singles (156, 1991)
- Second in the AL Rookie of the Year selection (1983, behind Ron Kittle)
- Led AL in at-bats (658, 1984)
- Top 10 MVP selection (8th, AL, 1994)
- Carolina League MVP (1980)
- Twice hit over .400 in the Mexican League (.423, 1999; .437, 2000)
- Oldest player to hit a Grand Slam (47, 2005, breaking his own record set in 2004 at 45)
- Oldest regularly playing non-pitcher player in MLB history (48)
- Second-oldest player to appear in MLB postseason play (48, during the 2006 postseason)
- Oldest player in Major League history to hit a home run (48)
- Second-oldest player to steal a base (48, during the 2007 season)
- Led all Dominican players in MLB history in seasons, games, at-bats, hits, and bases on balls
- 4,000 Professional Hit Club: Has compiled over 4,200 hits in his 26-year professional career, making him one of only eight known players with at least 4,000 professional hits (the others being Pete Rose, Ty Cobb, Hank Aaron, Jigger Statz, Stan Musial, Derek Jeter, and Ichiro Suzuki).
  - Major League Baseball: 2586 (through end of 2007 season)
  - Minor Leagues: 618
  - Mexican League: 316
  - Japan's Nippon Professional Baseball: 286
  - Dominican Winter League: 267
  - South Korea's KBO League: 156
  - United Baseball League: 6
  - TOTAL: 4,235
- As of 2006, Julio Franco was the only active player to face a pitcher who pitched against Hall of Famer Ted Williams, who retired in 1960. The pitcher is Jim Kaat, who played in the majors from 1959 to 1983. Williams had batted against Kaat the final day of the 1959 season, Kaat's rookie year. Kaat walked Franco in the latter's rookie season in 1982.
- Franco is the only MLB player known to have hit a home run with his grandson in attendance.
- Franco was the sixth batter that Roger Clemens ever faced, and when the two faced each other on June 15, 2007, they became the oldest batter-pitcher pair in the major leagues since October 1, 1933.

== Personal life ==
Franco is a practicing Christian. In a 2005 interview with the Baptist Press, he said, "I’ve been a Christian for 15 years," and added, "I want to play until I’m 50 years old. I know that my body is the temple of the Holy Spirit and I want to keep my body healthy. I believe the key to that is discipline and obedience.”

== See also ==
- List of Major League Baseball career hits leaders
- List of Major League Baseball career doubles leaders
- List of Major League Baseball career runs scored leaders
- List of Major League Baseball career runs batted in leaders
- List of Major League Baseball career stolen bases leaders
- List of Major League Baseball career games played leaders
- List of Major League Baseball batting champions

== Notes ==
Awards and achievements
Preceded by Jesse Orosco	Oldest Player in the National League; 2004–2007	Succeeded by Jamie Moyer
