= Jaime Cocanower =

Puerto Rican baseball player (born 1957)

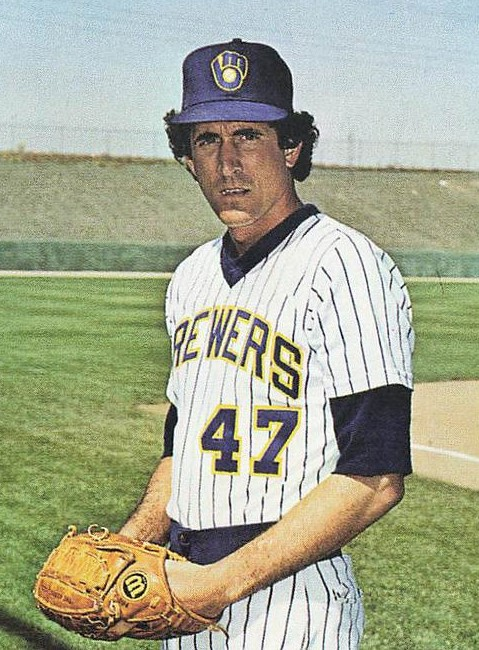
- Pitcher
- Born: February 14, 1957 (age 69); San Juan, Puerto Rico
- Batted: Right Threw: Right

MLB debut
- September 7, 1983, for the Milwaukee Brewers

Last MLB appearance
- July 12, 1986, for the Milwaukee Brewers

MLB statistics
- Win–loss record: 16–25
- Earned run average: 3.99
- Strikeouts: 139
- Stats at Baseball Reference

Teams
- Milwaukee Brewers (1983–1986)

James Stanley Cocanower (/ˈhaɪmiː/ HY-mee; born February 14, 1957) is a Puerto Rican former Major League Baseball pitcher who played for the Milwaukee Brewers from 1983 to 1986.

== College career ==
Cocanower played college baseball at Baylor University, and was a pitcher for them during their appearances in the 1977 and 1978 College World Series, the Bears' first world series appearances. Cocanower's first world series matchup was a pitcher's duel against the 1977 National Player of the Year Randy Martz of the University of South Carolina, which was tied 1–1 in nine innings. After Baylor 0–4 run during Cocanower's time as a Bear, he was signed by the Milwaukee Brewers as an amateur free agent on June 7, 1978, ending his college career.

== Professional career ==
Cocanower began his first season of professional baseball in 1979, pitching for the Stockton Ports of the California League. He appeared in 20 games and started eight of them, finishing the season with a 2–4 record and an earned run average (ERA) of 4.15. Cocanower spent a second season at Stockton, where he was the on a team that included Mike Madden and fellow Baylor teammate Andy Beene. In 27 starts, Cocanower had 198 innings pitched, a 17–5 record, ten complete games, and a 2.18 ERA, and was the MVP of the California League in 1980. For the 1981 season, Cocanower was promoted to the Brewers' AAA-level affiliate, the Vancouver Canadians of the Pacific Coast League. He had six wins, 12 losses, and a 5.65 ERA, and split time the next season between Vancouver and the El Paso Diablos. He pitched nine games for the Diablos and 14 games for the Canadians, with a 3–1 record and a 3.32 ERA for the Diablos, and a 4–3 record with a 4.86 ERA for the Canadians. Cocanower spent most of the 1983 season as a member of the Canadians' rotation. He posted a 10–10 record with a 4.81 ERA over the course of the season, and was brought up to the Brewers as the minor league season ended.

Cocanower made his major league debut on September 7, 1983, against the New York Yankees, pitching four innings and allowing an earned run in an 11–5 loss. For the season, he pitched in five games and started in three, finishing with a 2–0 record and a 1.80 ERA. Cocanower spent the 1984 season in the starting rotation, alongside Don Sutton and Moose Haas. He finished the season with 33 appearances and eight wins, 16 losses and a 4.02 ERA. He spent the 1985 season as a spot starter, starting in 15 games. He finished the season with a 6–8 record, a 4.33 ERA, and three complete games. Cocanower set an unofficial record in July 1985 when he threw a wild pitch in eight consecutive appearances. Cocanower was used less frequently in 1986. He made 17 appearances with a 4.43 ERA, pitching in just under 45 innings.

Cocanower played his final major league game on July 12, 1986. He spent the rest of the season with the Beloit Brewers and the Arkansas Travelers. He was released by the Brewers on December 23, 1986, and was signed by the Los Angeles Dodgers on February 26, 1987. After a season with the Albuquerque Dukes where he had an ERA of 6.35, his professional career came to an end.

== See also ==
- List of Major League Baseball players from Puerto Rico
