= Rick Waits =

American baseball player (born 1952)

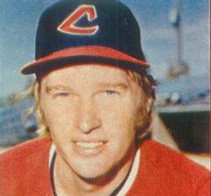
- Pitcher
- Born: May 15, 1952 (age 73); Atlanta, Georgia, U.S.
- Batted: Left Threw: Left

MLB debut
- September 17, 1973, for the Texas Rangers

Last MLB appearance
- October 6, 1985, for the Milwaukee Brewers

MLB statistics
- Win–loss record: 79–92
- Earned run average: 4.25
- Strikeouts: 659
- Stats at Baseball Reference

Teams
- Texas Rangers (1973); Cleveland Indians (1975–1983); Milwaukee Brewers (1983–1985)

Michael Richard Waits (born May 15, 1952) is an American former professional baseball pitcher. Waits, who threw left-handed, played all or part of twelve seasons in Major League Baseball (MLB) for the Texas Rangers (1973), Cleveland Indians (1975–83), and Milwaukee Brewers (1983–85). Waits served as minor league pitching coordinator for the Seattle Mariners organization before being named pitching coach for the Mariners under new manager Lloyd McClendon for the 2014 season.

== Playing career ==
Waits was drafted by the Washington Senators in the fifth round of the 1970 Major League Baseball draft. He made his debut on September 17, 1973, pitching one game for the Texas Rangers, who had moved from Washington by then. On June 13, 1975, he was traded to the Cleveland Indians with Jim Bibby, Jackie Brown and cash for Gaylord Perry. Waits, a starter in his prime, beat the New York Yankees in the final regular season game of 1978, forcing a one-game playoff between the Yankees and Boston Red Sox for the American League East division title. After the Indians-Yankees game ended, news of the Indians' victory was announced on Fenway Park's video screen (The Red Sox had defeated the Toronto Blue Jays 5–0 only moments earlier) with the words "THANK YOU, RICK WAITS, GAME TOMORROW." He was dealt along with Rick Manning from the Indians to the Brewers for Gorman Thomas, Jamie Easterly and Ernie Camacho on June 6, 1983.

== Coaching career ==
In 1987, Waits joined the Rimini Pirates of the Italian Baseball League, leading them to two championships (1987 and 1988) and a European Cup Championship (1989). He led the league in ERA, serving the last two seasons (1988 and 1989) as a player-manager. He also managed the IBL's Parma Angels.

Waits later joined the New York Mets organization, where he worked for fifteen years in various capacities, including a stint as the team's bullpen coach in 2003.

Waits was hired by Cory Snyder, manager of the Chinatrust Brothers of Taiwan's CPBL as pitching coach for 2017 season.

Preceded by Randy Niemann	New York Mets bullpen coach 2003-2004	Succeeded by Guy Conti
Preceded by Carl Willis	Seattle Mariners pitching coach 2014-2015	Succeeded by Mel Stottlemyre Jr.
