= Doug Loman =

American baseball player (born 1958)

- Outfielder
- Born: May 9, 1958 (age 67); Bakersfield, California
- Batted: Left Threw: Left

Professional debut
- MLB: September 3, 1984, for the Milwaukee Brewers
- NPB: 1986, for the Yokohama Taiyō Whales

Last appearance
- MLB: May 11, 1985, for the Milwaukee Brewers
- NPB: 1986, for the Yokohama Taiyō Whales

MLB statistics
- Batting average: .246
- Home runs: 2
- Runs batted in: 19

NPB statistics
- Batting average: .291
- Home runs: 14
- Runs batted in: 75
- Stats at Baseball Reference

Teams
- Milwaukee Brewers (1984–1985); Yokohama Taiyō Whales (1986)

Douglas Edward Loman (born May 9, 1958) is an American retired professional baseball player whose career spanned nine seasons, two of which were spent in Major League Baseball (MLB) with the Milwaukee Brewers. Loman began his professional career in 1978 with the Class-A Burlington Bees in Milwaukee's minor league organization. He made his MLB debut on September 3, 1984. Over his two-year major league career, Loman, an outfielder, batted .246 with seven doubles, two triples, two home runs, and 19 runs batted in (RBIs) in 47 games played. After playing in North America for his first eight seasons, Loman went to Japan to play in their professional baseball league. During his playing career, Loman was listed at a height of 5 feet 11 inches (180 cm) and a weight of 185 pounds (84 kg). He batted and threw left-handed. He graduated from Bakersfield High School.

== Professional career ==
During the January phase of the 1978 Major League Baseball draft, Loman was selected in the second round (33^{rd} overall) by the Milwaukee Brewers out of Bakersfield Junior College. He began his professional career that season in Milwaukee's minor league organization with the Class-A Burlington Bees of the Midwest League. With the Bees, Loman batted .244 with 100 hits, 23 doubles, four triples, 63 runs batted in (RBIs), and 14 stolen bases in 125 games played. In 1979, Loman was assigned to the Class-A Stockton Ports of the California League. In 138 games played, he batted .276 with 144 hits, 22 doubles, nine triples, and nine home runs. He was tied for second in the league in triples.

Loman was promoted to the Holyoke Millers of the Double-A Eastern League in 1980. With the Millers, he batted .261 with 123 hits, 20 doubles, nine triples, eight home runs, 62 RBIs, and 14 stolen bases. Among league batters, he was tied for third in triples. In 1981, Loman split the season between the Double-A El Paso Diablos, and the Triple-A Vancouver Canadians. First with the Diablos, he batted .306 with 83 hits, 17 doubles, two triples, seven home runs, and 42 RBIs in 71 games played. He was then promoted to the Canadians, where in 62 games played, he batted .248 with 53 hits, eight doubles, two triples, six home runs, and 19 RBIs.

In 1982, Loman spent the entire season with the Triple-A Vancouver Canadians of the Pacific Coast League. In 118 games, he batted 106 hits, 19 doubles, six triples, 14 home runs, and 64 RBIs. In addition to being the team's outfielder, Loman was also the team's designated hitter. Loman later commented that he contemplated quitting baseball after the 1982 season and becoming a juvenile counselor. Loman was again a member of the Vancouver Canadians in 1983. He batted .262 with 122 hits, 20 doubles, four triples, 19 home runs, and 78 RBIs in 130 games played.

Loman started the 1984 season at the Triple-A level, with the Vancouver Canadians, batting .324 with 170 hits, 34 doubles, nine triples, and 18 home runs in 142 games played. He led the Pacific Coast League in hits, was fifth in doubles, tied for fifth in triples, and tenth in home runs. On September 3, 1984, the Milwaukee Brewers called Loman up to the major leagues. He made his MLB debut that day against the Boston Red Sox, getting two hits in four at-bats. On September 23, against the Toronto Blue Jays, Loman hit two home runs, the only home runs of his MLB career. In 23 major league games that season, he batted .276 with 13 runs scored, 21 hits, four doubles, two home runs, and 12 RBIs.

In 1985, Loman made the Brewers major league roster as a platooned center fielder. During spring training that year, Brewers manager George Bamberger said, "[Loman] hasn't looked good, he's looked outstanding". That year, Loman gained the nickname "Piggy" due to his short and bulky frame. In 24 games played with the Brewers that season, he batted .212 with 10 runs scored, three doubles, two triples, and seven RBIs. On May 15, Loman was optioned to the Triple-A Vancouver Canadians. Ernest Riles replaced Loman on the Brewers roster. With the Canadians that season, Loman batted .294 with 113 hits, 23 doubles, six triples, and 10 home runs. On September 27, 1985, he was released by the Brewers. In 1986, Loman signed with the Yokohama Taiyō Whales of the Nippon Professional Baseball. As a member of Yokohama, Loman batted .291 with 137 hits, 26 doubles, four triples, 14 home runs, 75 RBIs, and 14 stolen bases in 126 games played.

== Later life ==
Loman served as a senior pastor at Summit Christian Fellowship in Colorado Springs, Colorado. Most recently, Loman served as an associate pastor at the Valley Bible Fellowship Church in Las Vegas, Nevada. In January 2011, his church was broken into by people seeking copper. The theft was estimated anywhere from $100,000–$125,000 in losses for the church.

== Personal ==
Loman was born on May 9, 1958, in Bakersfield, California. He is a Christian, and attributed his success in baseball to the religion. His son, Seth Loman, is a professional baseball player in the Chicago White Sox minor league organization.
