= Luis Pujols =

Dominican baseball player and manager (born 1955)

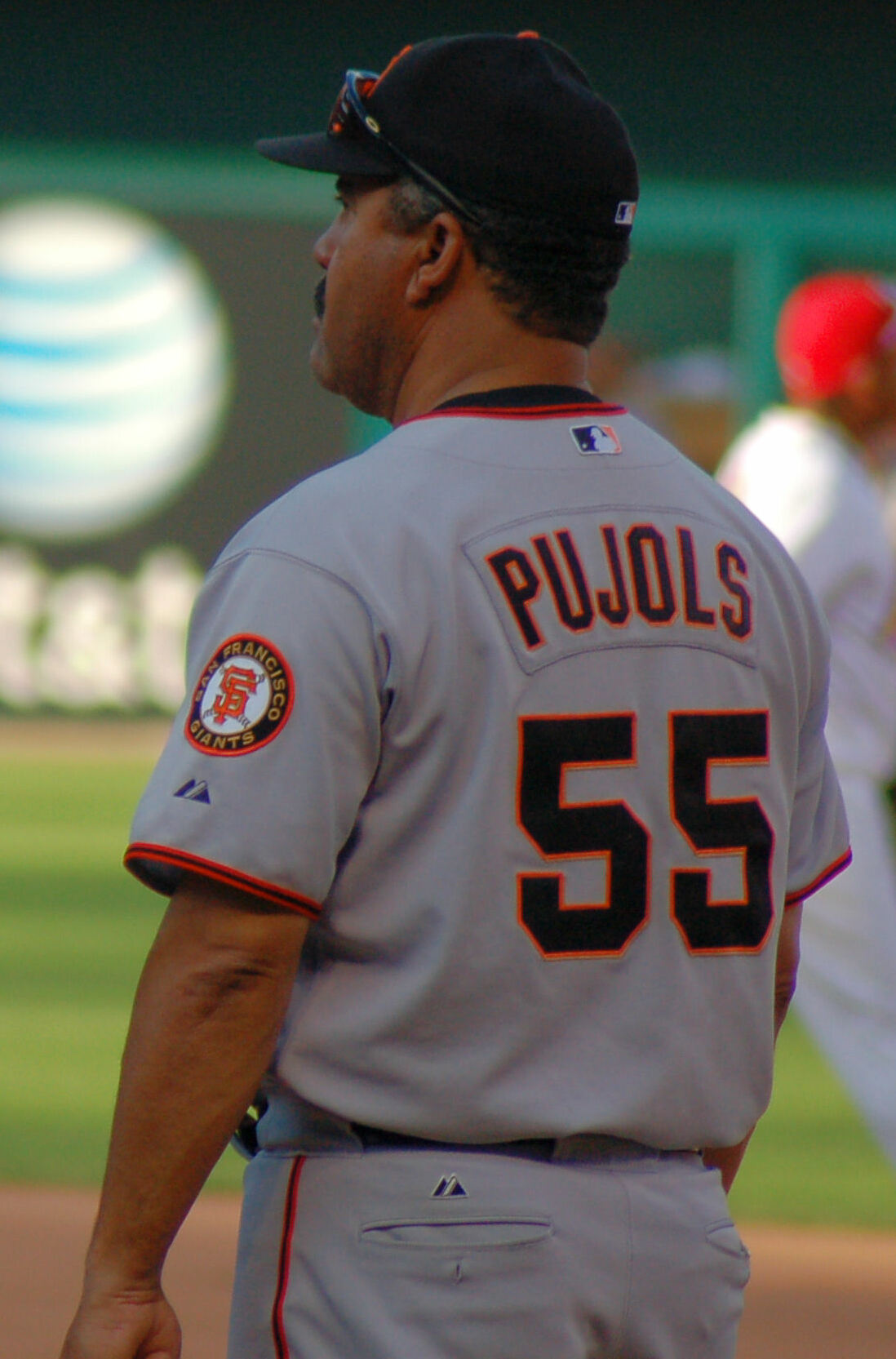
- Pujols with the San Francisco Giants in 2006
- Catcher / Manager
- Born: November 18, 1955 (age 70); Santiago de los Caballeros, Santiago Rodríguez Province, Dominican Republic
- Batted: Right Threw: Right

MLB debut
- September 22, 1977, for the Houston Astros

Last MLB appearance
- May 22, 1985, for the Texas Rangers

MLB statistics
- Batting average: .193
- Home runs: 6
- Runs batted in: 81
- Managerial record: 55–100
- Winning %: .355
- Stats at Baseball Reference
- Managerial record at Baseball Reference

Teams
- As player: Houston Astros (1977–1983); Kansas City Royals (1984); Texas Rangers (1985); As manager: Detroit Tigers (2002); As coach: Montreal Expos (1993–2000); San Francisco Giants (2003–2006)

Luis Bienvenido Pujols Toribio (born November 18, 1955) is a Dominican former professional baseball player coach and manager. He played in Major League Baseball (MLB) as a catcher from 1977 to 1985, most prominently as a member of the Houston Astros where he helped the franchise win its first-ever National League Western Division title and postseason berth in 1980. He also played for the Kansas City Royals and the Texas Rangers. Although Pujols didn't produce impressive offensive statistics, he excelled defensively which enabled him to sustain a nine-year career as a back-up catcher.

After his playing career, Pujols served as a major league coach before being named the interim manager for the Detroit Tigers in 2002. He later became a minor league manager for the Astros and the Baltimore Orioles. Pujols is the cousin of St. Louis Cardinals first baseman Albert Pujols.

== Career ==
=== Houston Astros ===
Seventeen-year-old Pujols signed with the Houston Astros as an amateur free agent out of the Dominican Republic in 1973. He batted .230 with five home runs and 107 runs batted in over five seasons in their farm system when he made his debut as a September call-up in 1977. He got one hit in fifteen at-bats over the remainder of the season. More importantly, he caught four of eight attempted base stealers.

He started the 1978 season in the minors, but was brought up mid-season around the time the Astros dealt starting catcher Joe Ferguson to the Los Angeles Dodgers. He platooned behind the plate with former first round draft pick Bruce Bochy, who was also called up at around the same time, for the remainder of the season. Pujols batted .131 with one home run and eleven RBIs.

The Astros acquired Alan Ashby from the Toronto Blue Jays to assume the starting catcher job in 1979. Bochy was given the back-up catcher job, and Pujols was reassigned to the triple A Charleston Charlies. In Charleston, he put together his finest season at any level, batting .249 with six home runs and 41 RBIs. He was called up to Houston in late August to again platoon with Bochy after Ashby injured himself in a game against the Montreal Expos, and was lost for the season. He was the hero of his second game back in the majors. In a tight race for the National League West, Pujols hit a triple and a double, driving in two and scoring one run to lead his team to a 9-4 victory over the Los Angeles Dodgers. He also had a three RBI game against the Atlanta Braves on September 25. For the season, he batted .227 with eight RBIs as the Astros finished a game and a half back of the Cincinnati Reds.

In 1980, Pujols spent his first full season in the majors. He batted .199 with twenty RBIs for an Astro team that captured its first division crown in franchise history. Though both were hobbled with injuries, Pujols actually received the bulk of the playing time over Ashby in the 1980 National League Championship Series against the Philadelphia Phillies. In thirteen plate appearances, he drew three walks and hit a triple off Hall of Famer Steve Carlton.

Following Carlton Fisk's departure from the Boston Red Sox via free agency, Pujols was rumored to be headed to Boston for Joe Rudi, but nothing ever materialized. Instead, he remained in Houston, and was on his way to his best season statistically when a players strike interrupted his season. On May 19, after hitting a triple against the St. Louis Cardinals' Bob Shirley, Pujols stole home for the only stolen base of his career. He batted .254 with one home run and eight RBIs in the first half, while batting .224 with six RBIs and no home runs in the second half. Still, the Astros won the NL West in the second half of the season to return to the post-season a second year in a row. Pujols came to bat seven times in the 1981 National League Division Series against the Los Angeles Dodgers without getting a hit.

Pujols had a nightmare of a game on June 24, 1982. With knuckleballer Joe Niekro on the mound, he was charged with four passed balls and allowed two additional wild pitches. He'd had only two passed balls up to that point in the season, but ended up leading the majors with twenty in only 488 innings behind the plate by season's end (the Texas Rangers' Jim Sundberg had the second highest with sixteen in 1136.2 innings). Likewise, his hitting tapered off as well as the season progressed. After his batting average peaked at .276 on July 2, he batted just .161 the rest of the way. He did, however, have a career high four home runs.

=== Final years ===
He split the 1983 season between the Astros and Triple A Tucson Toros, and spent the entire 1984 season in Tucson until being dealt to the Kansas City Royals for minor leaguer James Miner. He appeared in four games for the Royals that September, collecting one hit in five at-bats.

He signed with the Texas Rangers for 1985, and seemed in line to win the back-up catcher job until pulling a muscle in his right arm in Spring training. After appearing in one regular season game, a fractured shoulder cost him the entire season. He returned healthy the following Spring, but failed to make the club. He spent the 1986 season in the minors with the Rangers, and the 1987 season in the Montreal Expos' organization before retiring. He spent the 1989 season as a member of the West Palm Beach Tropics in the Senior Professional Baseball Association.

=== Coaching ===
When Felipe Alou had the interim tag removed from his managerial position with the Montreal Expos for the 1993 season, he asked Pujols to serve as his first base coach. He remained there through the 1999 season, moving into the bench coach position for 2000. On July 20, he was fired and replaced by Jeff Cox.

He managed the Detroit Tigers' double A Eastern League affiliate, the Erie SeaWolves, to an 84-58 record in 2001 before becoming bench coach with the major league club for the 2002 season. He ended up becoming the Tigers' interim manager for most of the season after Phil Garner was fired six games into the season. Tigers GM Dave Dombrowski hired Felipe Alou to be Pujols' bench coach for the remainder of the season. On June 25, history was made when the Tigers faced off against the Kansas City Royals, who were managed by Tony Peña. It was the first time two Dominican-born managers opposed each other in a major league game. An infamous incident in Pujols's year managing was when the Tigers somehow batted out of order. Pujols was released at the end of the 2002 season. Under Pujols, the Tigers posted a 55–100 record for a .355 winning percentage, the worst of any manager at that point in club history. The Tigers won only 43 games the following season.

He ended up following Alou to the San Francisco Giants, where he served as first base coach until Alou and his entire staff were fired at the end of the 2006 season. When Alou was named manager of the Dominican team in the 2009 World Baseball Classic, Pujols joined him there as well. On December 10, 2007, Luis Pujols was named manager of the Corpus Christi Hooks, Class double A farm team of the Houston Astros.

On February 25, 2013, he became the Manager for the Delmarva Shorebirds, the lower level Single-A affiliate of the Baltimore Orioles. In February 2014 he was named the manager for the Frederick Keys, the advanced Single-A affiliate of the Baltimore Orioles.

Preceded by Tommy Harper	Montreal Expos first base coach 1993–1999	Succeeded by Perry Hill
Preceded by Gene Glynn	Montreal Expos Bench coach 2000	Succeeded by Jeff Cox
Preceded by Phil Garner	Detroit Tigers Manager; 2002	Succeeded by Alan Trammell
Preceded by Gene Clines	San Francisco Giants first base coach 2003–2006	Succeeded by Willie Upshaw
Preceded by Ryan Minor	Frederick Keys manager 2014	Succeeded by Orlando Gómez
