= George Vukovich =

American baseball player (born 1956)

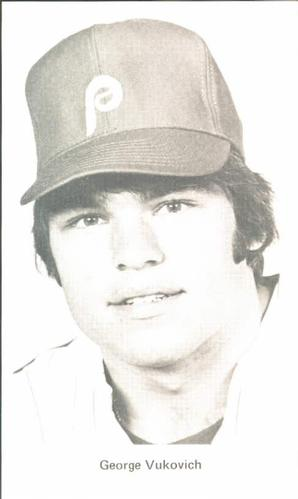
- Right fielder
- Born: June 24, 1956 (age 69); Chicago, Illinois, U.S.
- Batted: Left Threw: Right

MLB debut
- April 13, 1980, for the Philadelphia Phillies

Last MLB appearance
- October 6, 1985, for the Cleveland Indians

MLB statistics
- Batting average: .268
- Home runs: 27
- Runs batted in: 203
- Stats at Baseball Reference

Teams
- Philadelphia Phillies (1980–1982); Cleveland Indians (1983–1985); Seibu Lions (1986–1987)

Career highlights and awards
- World Series champion (1980)

George Stephen Vukovich (born June 24, 1956) is an American former right fielder in Major League Baseball who played for the Philadelphia Phillies and Cleveland Indians in all or part of six seasons from 1980 to 1985. Listed at 6' 0" (1.83 m), 198 lb. (90 kg), Vukovich batted left handed and threw right handed. He was born in Chicago.

Vukovich attended college at Southern Illinois University, where he was a member of Phi Sigma Kappa fraternity. The Phillies selected him in the fourth round of the 1977 MLB draft out of SIU.

Vukovich made his major league debut with the Phillies in 1980, appearing as a pinch hitter in a game against the Montreal Expos. He received a World Series ring in his rookie season, even though he did not play in the Series.

In 1981, Vukovich hit a game-winning home run against the Montreal Expos in Game 4 of the National League Division Series. It remains the only walk-off home run in Phillies playoff history.

Vukovich was one of five Phillies along with Manny Trillo, Julio Franco, Jerry Willard and Jay Baller who were traded to the Indians for Von Hayes at the Winter Meetings on December 9, 1982. Afterwards, he played two seasons in Japan for the Seibu Lions from 1986 to 1987.

In between, Vukovich played winter ball with the Águilas del Zulia of the Venezuelan League during three seasons spanning 1979–1982. He later made a brief appearance for the Daytona Beach Explorers of the Senior Professional Baseball Association in 1991.
