= Jerry Willard =

American baseball player (born 1960)

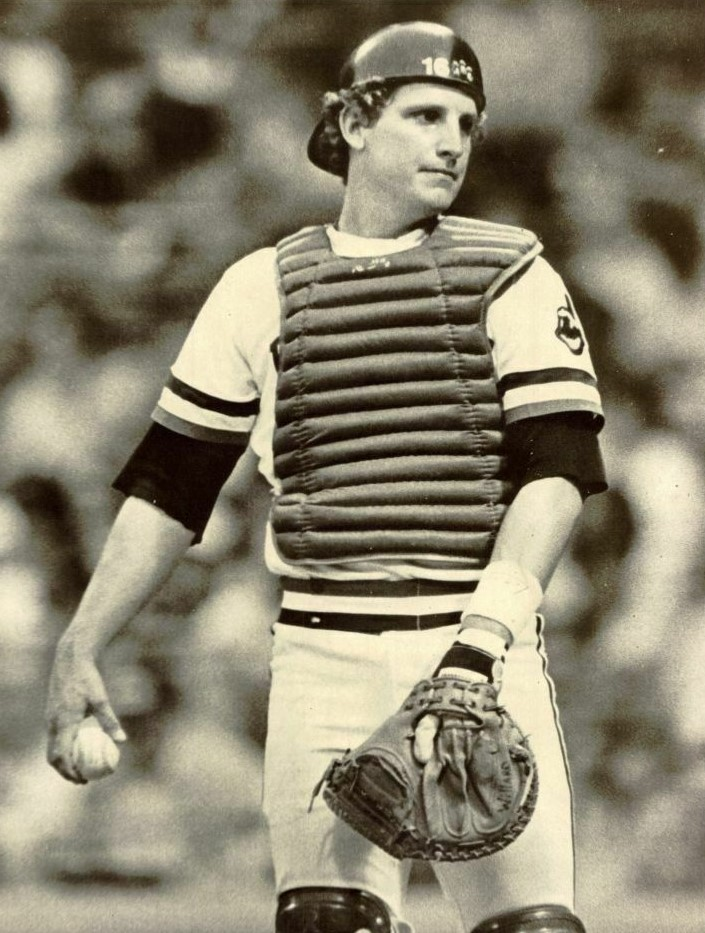
- Catcher
- Born: March 14, 1960 (age 66); Oxnard, California, U.S.
- Batted: Left Threw: Right

MLB debut
- April 11, 1984, for the Cleveland Indians

Last MLB appearance
- May 19, 1994, for the Seattle Mariners

MLB statistics
- Batting average: .249
- Home runs: 25
- Runs batted in: 114
- Stats at Baseball Reference

Teams
- Cleveland Indians (1984–1985); Oakland Athletics (1986–1987); Chicago White Sox (1990); Atlanta Braves (1991–1992); Montreal Expos (1992); Seattle Mariners (1994)

Gerald Duane Willard (born March 14, 1960) is an American former professional baseball catcher. He played in Major League Baseball (MLB) from 1984 to 1994 for the Cleveland Indians, Oakland Athletics, Chicago White Sox, Atlanta Braves, Montreal Expos, and Seattle Mariners. He currently works as a Campus Supervisor for the Oxnard Union High School District and coaches baseball at Adolfo Camarillo High School.

== Career ==
A 1978 graduate of Hueneme High School in Oxnard, California, Willard was signed by the Philadelphia Phillies as an amateur free agent in 1979. He was one of five Phillies along with Manny Trillo, George Vukovich, Julio Franco and Jay Baller who were traded to the Cleveland Indians for Von Hayes at the Winter Meetings on December 9, 1982. Willard would make his Major League Baseball debut with the Indians on April 11, 1984, and appeared in his final game on May 19, 1994.

Willard's career was spent mostly in obscurity. However, he did experience one significant moment of fame. On October 23, 1991, playing for the Atlanta Braves in the 1991 World Series against the Minnesota Twins, Willard made his only series plate appearance in the bottom of the ninth in a 2–2 game. He was pinch-hitting for Francisco Cabrera after a Minnesota pitching change with Mark Lemke on third Base. Facing top reliever Steve Bedrosian with one out, Willard lofted a high fly out to right fielder Shane Mack that proved to be deep enough to score Lemke with the winning run.

Willard's catching career came to an abrupt end on May 10, 1994, when a foul tip off the bat of Julio Franco struck his right shoulder, causing a fracture and damaged cartilage. He was catching for the Seattle Mariners versus the Chicago White Sox. Unable to complete a throw, he spent the rest of the season between the DL, the minors, and pinch hitting. He was forced to retire at the end of the 1994 season. Today, the piece of padding attached to a catcher's chest protector for extra coverage of his throwing-side's shoulder is called a 'Willard' due to this incident.

== See also ==
- Montreal Expos all-time roster
- Chicago White Sox all-time roster
