= Jay Baller =

American baseball player (born 1960)

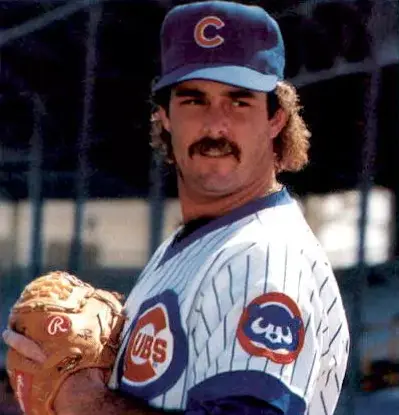
- Baller c. 1987
- Pitcher
- Born: October 6, 1960 (age 65); Stayton, Oregon, U.S.
- Batted: Right Threw: Right

Professional debut
- MLB: September 19, 1982, for the Philadelphia Phillies
- NPB: May 6, 1994, for the Orix BlueWave

Last appearance
- MLB: August 31, 1992, for the Philadelphia Phillies
- NPB: September 23, 1994, for the Orix BlueWave

MLB statistics
- Win–loss record: 4–9
- Earned run average: 5.24
- Strikeouts: 117

NPB statistics
- Win–loss record: 0–0
- Earned run average: 4.15
- Strikeouts: 26
- Stats at Baseball Reference

Teams
- Philadelphia Phillies (1982); Chicago Cubs (1985–1987); Kansas City Royals (1990); Philadelphia Phillies (1992); Orix BlueWave (1994)

Jay Scot Baller (/ˈbælər/ BAL-ər; born October 6, 1960) is an American former professional baseball pitcher. He played in Major League Baseball (MLB) for the Philadelphia Phillies, Chicago Cubs, and Kansas City Royals. Listed at 6' 6", 215 lbs., he batted and threw right-handed.

Baller spent parts of six different seasons in the majors but never was able to stick with a big league time for an entire campaign. Primarily a reliever, he recorded 137 saves in 14 Minor League seasons and six saves in 94 Major League contests.

== Career ==
Baller was selected by the Phillies in the fourth round (98th overall) of the 1979 MLB draft out of Canby High School in Canby, Oregon. He made his Major League debut with the Phillies as a reliever on September 19, 1982, throwing a scoreless, hitless inning against the Pittsburgh Pirates. He pitched in three other games that season, including one of his five major league starts, before returning to the minor leagues.

He was one of five Phillies along with Manny Trillo, George Vukovich, Julio Franco and Jerry Willard who were traded to the Cleveland Indians for Von Hayes at the Winter Meetings on December 9, 1982. He spent the next two seasons as a starter in Cleveland's minor leagues before being traded to the Chicago Cubs for Dan Rohn in April 1985. Baller returned to MLB that season, appearing in 20 games (4 starts) and posting a respectable 3.46 ERA. Baller split the 1986 season between the Triple-A Iowa Cubs and Chicago, sporting a 5.37 ERA, a 2–4 record and five saves in 36 games in the majors, the most extensive big-league action of his career.

In 1987 Baller spent the majority of the year in Iowa. In 23 games with Chicago, he went 0–1 and saw his ERA rise yet again to 6.75. The Cubs released him in December. He signed as a free agent with the Seattle Mariners and spent the 1988 season with their Triple-A team, the Calgary Cannons. After the season Baller signed with the Montreal Expos organization, and became a full-time closer for their Triple-A team, the Indianapolis Indians, posting a career-high 34 saves and a 2.02 ERA. Granted free agency again, Baller signed with the Kansas City Royals and found his way back to the majors in 1990. However, he was ineffective, managing only an inflated 15.43 ERA in three games.

After the 1990 season Baller signed with the Houston Astros but was released before the season began. He then returned to the Phillies organization, where he started his career. After an entire season at Triple-A with the Scranton/Wilkes-Barre Red Barons, Baller re-signed with the Phillies for 1992. Now old for a minor leaguer at age 31, Baller was a very effective closer for Scranton/Wilkes-Barre, saving 22 games while sporting a nifty 1.42 ERA. Promoted to Philadelphia, Baller appeared in the final eight games of his major league career, managing an 8.18 ERA as he allowed five home runs and 10 earned runs in 11 innings of work. Baller was granted free agency again after the season, but there were no takers for his services, and he retired from baseball.

In between, Baller played winter ball with the Águilas del Zulia, Leones del Caracas and Tiburones de La Guaira clubs of the Venezuelan League in five seasons spanning 1982–1993, posting a collective record of 13–11 and a 2.39 ERA in 136 appearances, garnering three Closer of the Year awards while setting an all-time league record with 56 saves that still remain intact. Additionally, he pitched in the Caribbean Series in the 1987 and 1993 editions for Caracas and Zulia, respectively.

== Personal life ==
Baller was arrested in 2007 when he was found in his vehicle cocking a handgun and passing it between his hands. Police discovered one bag (roughly one-eighth of an ounce [3.5 g]) of cocaine in each coat pocket and also one bag behind the driver's seat. A bag containing $15,000 was also found in the car.

He lives in Muhlenberg, Pennsylvania, with his wife and four children.
