= Willie Lozado =

American baseball player (born 1959)

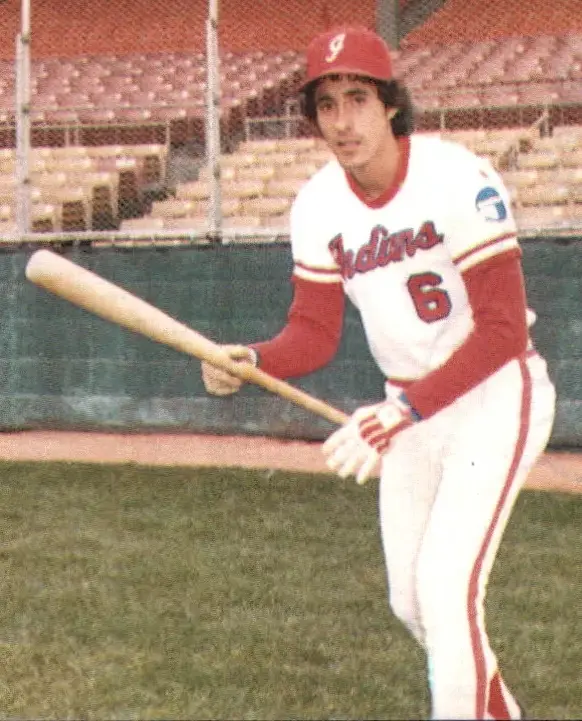
- Lozado with the Indianapolis Indians c. 1983
- Infielder
- Born: May 12, 1959 (age 67); New York, New York, U.S.
- Batted: Right Threw: Right

MLB debut
- July 16, 1984, for the Milwaukee Brewers

Last MLB appearance
- September 30, 1984, for the Milwaukee Brewers

MLB statistics
- Batting average: .271
- Home runs: 1
- Runs batted in: 20
- Runs: 15
- Stats at Baseball Reference

Teams
- Milwaukee Brewers (1984)

William Lozado (born May 12, 1959) is an American former professional baseball infielder. He played in Major League Baseball (MLB) for the Milwaukee Brewers during the 1984 season.

Following the 1984 season, Lozado was selected in the Rule 5 draft by the St. Louis Cardinals but was released the following year. Previously, he had been drafted by the Detroit Tigers and Minnesota Twins, but did not sign with either team.

Lozado played at the college level at Miami-Dade Community College.
