= Von Hayes =

American baseball player (born 1958)

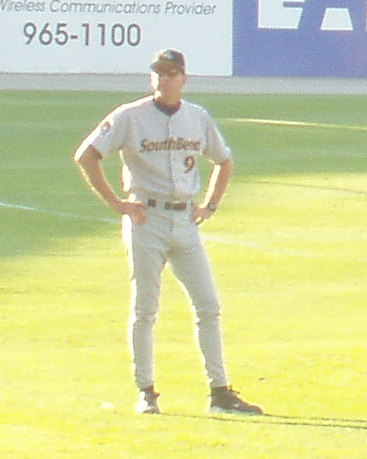
- Hayes with the South Bend Silver Hawks in 2003
- Outfielder / First baseman
- Born: August 31, 1958 (age 68); Stockton, California, U.S.
- Batted: Left Threw: Right

MLB debut
- April 14, 1981, for the Cleveland Indians

Last MLB appearance
- August 19, 1992, for the California Angels

MLB statistics
- Batting average: .267
- Home runs: 143
- Runs batted in: 696
- Stats at Baseball Reference

Teams
- Cleveland Indians (1981–1982); Philadelphia Phillies (1983–1991); California Angels (1992)

Career highlights and awards
- All-Star (1989)

Von Francis Hayes (born August 31, 1958) is an American former professional baseball player and manager. He played in Major League Baseball (MLB) as an outfielder from 1981 to 1992, most prominently with the Philadelphia Phillies where he was a member of the 1983 National League pennant-winning team and where he was a named an All-Star player in 1989. He also played for the Cleveland Indians and the California Angels. After his playing career, Hayes continued to work in professional baseball as a minor league baseball manager.

== Early years ==
Hayes was born to an American father, Donald Hayes, who was a tail gunner on a B-17 in World War II, and a Puerto Rican mother, Leonor Rosario, who grew up on a rural country farm without electricity. Leonor was determined to get an education and pursue a life helping others. After receiving a college degree, she migrated from Puerto Rico to Stockton at the age of 22 and became a nurse. While attending St. Mary’s High School, Hayes and his older brother Mike played football. Hayes also played in the school's baseball team as a third and later first baseman. He began his career in baseball when in June 1979 the Cleveland Indians drafted him in the seventh round.

== Playing career ==
Hayes was acquired by the Phillies from the Indians for Manny Trillo, George Vukovich, Julio Franco, Jerry Willard, and Jay Baller at the Winter Meetings on December 9, 1982. The Indians received offers for Hayes from various teams, with the Phillies being the most persistent. The trade inspired his nickname "Five-for-One" which was coined by Pete Rose.

Hayes enjoyed his most successful seasons playing for the Phillies in the late 1980s. He finished 8th in NL MVP voting in 1986, when he led the National League (NL) in runs, doubles, and extra base hits. Hayes achieved an on-base average of .404 in 1987. In 1989, Hayes made his only appearance on the NL All-Star team, while posting a career-high OPS+ of (140).

On June 11, 1985, Hayes became the first player in MLB history to hit two home runs in the first inning. After leading off the game with a home run off Tom Gorman, Hayes hit a grand slam later that inning off Calvin Schiraldi. The Phillies beat the Mets 26-7, the most single-game runs scored by a major league team in over 35 years.

Hayes also hit two two-run home runs in a June 8, 1989, game against the Pittsburgh Pirates, at Veterans Stadium. It was in that game that, after the Pirates scored 10 runs in the top of the first inning, Pirate broadcaster Jim Rooker said on the air, "If we lose this game, I'll walk home." Hayes's two homers triggered a comeback, with the Phillies eventually winning the game 15-11. (After the season, Rooker kept his word, by conducting a charity walk from Philadelphia to Pittsburgh.)

Playing against the Cincinnati Reds on June 14, 1991, Hayes was hit by a pitch by Tom Browning, breaking Hayes’s arm. He returned to action on September 6, 1991, against the Houston Astros. Hayes was traded to the Angels in the off-season, but would later cite Browning's pitch as having ended his career, "I broke my arm when I was hit by a pitch from Tom Browning ... and I was finished. I tried to make a comeback (with California) in 1992, but it was no good."

An indie rock band named themselves after Hayes. Hayes was the inspiration for one of ESPN announcer Chris Berman's "Bermanisms" — Von "Purple" Hayes — a nod to the Jimi Hendrix song "Purple Haze."

== Career statistics ==
Years	Games	PA	AB	R	H	2B	3B	HR	RBI	SB	BB	SO	AVG	OBP	SLG	FLD%
12	1495	6052	5249	767	1402	282	36	143	696	253	712	804	.267	.354	.416	.987

Hayes played 555 games at right field, 401 games at first base, 398 games at center field, 207 games at left field and 23 games at third base.

== Managerial career ==
In November 2007, Hayes was named manager of the Lancaster Barnstormers of the Atlantic League of Professional Baseball. Hayes debuted with the South Central Pennsylvania-based franchise in the 2008 season. Hayes has also managed Minor League teams in South Bend, Modesto, and Midland, and was California League Manager of the Year in 2004 and Texas League Manager of the Year in 2005.

On Oct. 26, 2009, the Camden Riversharks of the Atlantic League of Professional Baseball announced they hired Hayes as their new manager.

He became the manager of the Alexandria Aces in United League Baseball in 2013. In December 2014, he was named the manager of the Pericos de Puebla in the Mexican League, but after a slow start he was replaced early in the season by Matías Carrillo. In 2016, he became the manager of the Algodoneros de San Luis Rio Colorado in the Northern Mexican League, an affiliate of the Mexican League. In 2017, Hayes returned to the Pericos de Puebla as the manager. However, after a 26-28 start to the season, he was fired on June 3, 2017.

== See also ==
- List of Major League Baseball career stolen bases leaders
- List of Major League Baseball annual runs scored leaders
- List of Major League Baseball annual doubles leaders
- List of Puerto Ricans

Preceded by Kevin McReynolds	National League Player of the Month; April, 1989	Succeeded by Will Clark
