= Ernie Camacho =

American baseball player (born 1955)

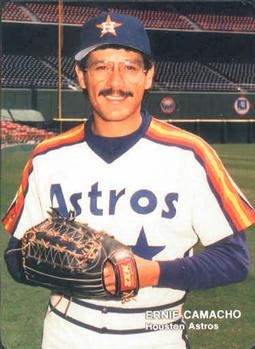
- Pitcher
- Born: February 1, 1955 (age 71); Salinas, California, U.S.
- Batted: Right Threw: Right

MLB debut
- May 22, 1980, for the Oakland Athletics

Last MLB appearance
- October 3, 1990, for the St. Louis Cardinals

MLB statistics
- Win–loss record: 10–20
- Earned run average: 4.21
- Strikeouts: 159
- Saves: 45
- Stats at Baseball Reference

Teams
- Oakland Athletics (1980); Pittsburgh Pirates (1981); Cleveland Indians (1983–1987); Houston Astros (1988); San Francisco Giants (1989–1990); St. Louis Cardinals (1990)

Ernest Carlos Camacho (born February 1, 1955) is an American former professional baseball player who pitched in Major League Baseball from 1980 to 1981 and 1983 to 1990. His best season came with the 1984 Cleveland Indians, when he led the team with 23 saves.

== Early life ==
Camacho grew up playing baseball in his hometown of Salinas, California, first as a Little League Baseball player, then as a student at Alisal High School and Hartnell College. Camacho was drafted by major league teams three times out of Hartnell College: the Pittsburgh Pirates selected him in the 12th round of the June 1975 draft, the California Angels took him in the fourth round of the January 1976 draft, and the Oakland Athletics selected him in the first round of the June 1976 draft.

== Career ==
After signing with Oakland, Camacho played for the team's minor-league affiliates until he made his major-league debut in 1980. In April 1981, he was the player to be named later that completed an earlier trade with the Pittsburgh Pirates for Bob Owchinko. After making a few major-league appearances with the 1981 Pirates, he was sent to the Chicago White Sox in a multiplayer trade before the 1982 season. He spent 1982 in the minor leagues before being granted free agency.

Camacho was briefly with the Milwaukee Brewers organization before being traded along with Gorman Thomas and Jamie Easterly to the Cleveland Indians for Rick Manning and Rick Waits on June 6, 1983. In 1984, Camacho led the Indians in saves with 23. Early in the 1985 season, Camacho had arm problems. He required two surgeries - one in April and one in October - which cost him the 1985 season. He had a short stint on the disabled list due to more arm problems in 1986. Camacho attributed the injury to having not thrown the ball in a full season. He was back in the closer role in late May 1986.

After a 20-save season in 1986, Camacho was never again able to sustain that level of effectiveness. After being granted free agency in late 1987, he had short stints with both major-league and minor-league teams over the next three seasons. The 1989 Triple-A season was one of his most encouraging, as he saved 13 games for the Phoenix Firebirds of the Pacific Coast League; in 13 games for the San Francisco Giants that season, he had a 2.76 earned run average but did not register any saves. He retired after the 1990 season.

== Later life ==
After his retirement from baseball, Camacho worked for a school district in Salinas, performing plumbing and electrical work. He contributed to fundraising and awareness for Alzheimer's disease, a disease that affected his father. Camacho also established an educational foundation and a youth baseball clinic in Salinas.
