= Rick Manning =

American baseball player and broadcaster (born 1954)

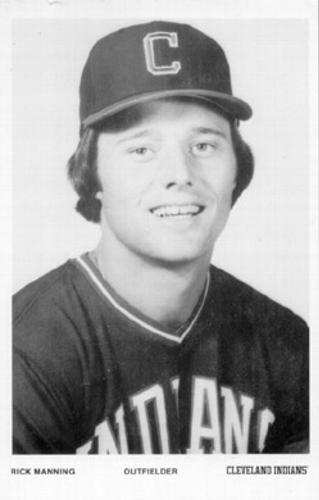
- Manning with the Cleveland Indians
- Center fielder
- Born: September 2, 1954 (age 72); Niagara Falls, New York, U.S.
- Batted: Left Threw: Right

MLB debut
- May 23, 1975, for the Cleveland Indians

Last MLB appearance
- October 4, 1987, for the Milwaukee Brewers

MLB statistics
- Batting average: .257
- Home runs: 56
- Runs batted in: 458
- Stats at Baseball Reference

Teams
- Cleveland Indians (1975–1983); Milwaukee Brewers (1983–1987)

Career highlights and awards
- Gold Glove Award (1976)

Richard Eugene Manning (born September 2, 1954) is an American former center fielder and current broadcaster in Major League Baseball (MLB), who played for the Cleveland Indians (1975–1983) and Milwaukee Brewers (1983–1987), and has been a color commentator for Cleveland Guardians telecasts since 1990.

== Major league career ==
Manning, who was the second overall selection in the 1972 MLB draft, made his major league debut with the Indians during the 1975 season. In 1976, he was recognized for his defensive play by winning the American League Gold Glove Award.

Manning had an affair with teammate Dennis Eckersley's wife, Denise; they eventually married, and then divorced. This may have led to the Indians' front office's decision to trade one of the players; there were other "official" and "unofficial" reasons given. Eckersley, a future Baseball Hall of Fame pitcher, was traded with Fred Kendall on March 30, 1978, to the Boston Red Sox for Rick Wise, Mike Paxton, Bo Díaz and Ted Cox.

After playing five more seasons with the Indians, Manning was traded along with Rick Waits to the Milwaukee Brewers for Gorman Thomas, Jamie Easterly and Ernie Camacho on June 6, 1983. As a member of the Brewers, he hit a 10th-inning single on August 26, 1987 as the Brewers defeated the Indians 1-0. Brewers fans actually booed Manning for driving in the winning run because Paul Molitor was on deck and looking to extend his 39-game hit streak. Manning's walk-off single deprived Molitor of one last chance to reach 40 games as he went 0-for-4 in the contest.

== Career highlights ==
On May 15, 1981, Manning caught Ernie Whitt's fly ball, the final out of Len Barker's perfect game, in one of the most memorable images in Cleveland sports history; the Indians defeated the Toronto Blue Jays, 3–0.

== Broadcasting career ==
Since 1990, he has served as a color commentator for Indians/Guardians telecasts. Manning has the longest tenure of any television announcer in team history.

Manning can be seen doing Guardians games on Guardians TV (alongside Matt Underwood). He resides in Chesterland, Ohio during the season, and Scottsdale, Arizona in the offseason. He also occasionally provides color commentary on regional broadcasts for Major League Baseball on FOX, mainly when FOX shows a Guardians game.

== Awards ==
- 1976 American League Gold Glove Award (Center Field)
- 1980 BBWAA (Baseball Writers' Association of America) Good Guy Award
- 1999 Greater Buffalo Sports Hall of Fame Inductee
- 2014 Cleveland Association of Broadcasters Excellence in Broadcasting Award
- Greater Cleveland Sports Hall of Fame (class of 2017)
- 2018 Lower Great Lakes Emmy Award winner as part of the Indians broadcast team

== See also ==
- List of Major League Baseball career stolen bases leaders
