= Andy Beene =

American baseball player (born 1956)

- Pitcher
- Born: October 13, 1956 (age 68); Freeport, Texas, U.S.
- Batted: Right Threw: Right

Professional debut
- MLB: September 22, 1983, for the Milwaukee Brewers
- NPB: June 9, 1985, for the Yakult Swallows

Last appearance
- MLB: August 24, 1984, for the Milwaukee Brewers
- NPB: July 13, 1985, for the Yakult Swallows

MLB statistics
- Win–loss record: 0–2
- Earned run average: 10.45
- Strikeouts: 11

NPB statistics
- Win–loss record: 2–2
- Earned run average: 7.25
- Strikeouts: 15
- Stats at Baseball Reference

Teams
- Milwaukee Brewers (1983–1984); Yakult Swallows (1985)

Ramon Andrew Beene (born October 13, 1956) is an American former Major League Baseball pitcher for the Milwaukee Brewers.

Beene played College baseball with Baylor University. Beene was initially drafted by the New York Yankees in 1978, but they did not sign him. He was drafted and signed by the Milwaukee Brewers in round five of the 1979 draft. While in the minor leagues, he played for the Butte Copper Kings in the Pioneer League in 1979, the Stockton Ports in the California League in 1980, the El Paso Diablos in the Texas League in 1982 and 1985, and the Vancouver Canadians in the Pacific Coast League in 1983 and 1984. He was added to the Brewer's 40 man roster in 1982.

His first Major League game was on September 22, 1983. In his first season playing with the Brewers he only played in one game. He pitched 2 innings in 1 game and gave up 3 hits, one intentional walk and an earned run. After playing some with the Brewers, he went back to the minors, but was recalled on July 25, 1984, due to Rollie Fingers being placed on the 21-day disabled list. In his second and final season with the Brewers, Beene pitched 18.2 innings in 5 games, and gave up 28 hits, 9 walks, and 23 earned runs for an earned run average of 11.09. Beene was made a scouting supervisor of the Toronto Blue Jays in December 1998. He was a scout for the Blue Jays for nine years. In 2009, Beene was a resident of Center Point, Kerr County, Texas. He is fellow former baseball player Fred Beene's nephew.
