= 1983 Oakland Athletics season =

1983 Oakland Athletics
- League: American League
- Division: West
- Ballpark: Oakland–Alameda County Coliseum
- City: Oakland, California
- Record: 74–88 (.457)
- Divisional place: 4th
- Owners: Walter A. Haas, Jr.
- General managers: Sandy Alderson
- Managers: Steve Boros
- Television: KBHK-TV (Bill King, Bill Rigney, Lon Simmons)
- Radio: KSFO (Bill King, Lon Simmons, Wayne Hagin)

The 1983 Oakland Athletics season was the 83rd season for the Oakland Athletics franchise, all as members of the American League, and their 16th season in Oakland. The Athletics finished fourth in the American League West with a record of 74 wins and 88 losses.

== Offseason ==
- October 9, 1982: Jack Daugherty was signed as an amateur free agent by the Athletics.
- November 4, 1982: Mickey Klutts was released by the Athletics.
- December 13, 1982: Kevin Bell was released by the Athletics.
- December 20, 1982: Preston Hanna was released by the Athletics.
- January 11, 1983: Steve Howard was drafted by the Athletics in the 8th round of the 1983 Major League Baseball draft.
- January 17, 1983: Brian Kingman was purchased from the Athletics by the Boston Red Sox.
- March 28, 1983: Bob Owchinko was released by the Oakland Athletics.

== Regular season ==
=== Season standings ===
AL West
Team	W	L	Pct.	GB	Home	Road
Chicago White Sox	99	63	.611	—	55‍–‍26	44‍–‍37
Kansas City Royals	79	83	.488	20	45‍–‍36	34‍–‍47
Texas Rangers	77	85	.475	22	44‍–‍37	33‍–‍48
Oakland Athletics	74	88	.457	25	42‍–‍39	32‍–‍49
California Angels	70	92	.432	29	35‍–‍46	35‍–‍46
Minnesota Twins	70	92	.432	29	37‍–‍44	33‍–‍48
Seattle Mariners	60	102	.370	39	30‍–‍51	30‍–‍51

=== Record vs. opponents ===
1983 American League record Sources:
Team	BAL	BOS	CAL	CWS	CLE	DET	KC	MIL	MIN	NYY	OAK	SEA	TEX	TOR
Baltimore	—	8–5	7–5	7–5	6–7	5–8	8–4	11–2	8–4	6–7	8–4	8–4	9–3	7–6
Boston	5–8	—	6–6	6–6	7–6	4–9	5–7	4–9	5–7	7–6	8–4	7–5	7–5	7–6
California	5–7	6–6	—	3–10	8–4	4–8	6–7	6–6	6–7	5–7	5–8	6–7	6–7	4–8
Chicago	5–7	6–6	10–3	—	8–4	8–4	9–4	4–8	8–5	8–4	8–5	12–1	8–5	5–7
Cleveland	7–6	6–7	4–8	4–8	—	5–8	7–5	3–10	6–6	6–7	7–5	8–4	3–9	4–9
Detroit	8–5	9–4	8–4	4–8	8–5	—	7–5	6–7	9–3	5–8	6–6	8–4	8–4	6–7
Kansas City	4–8	7–5	7–6	4–9	5–7	5–7	—	6–6	6–7	6–6	7–6	8–5	8–5–1	6–6
Milwaukee	2–11	9–4	6–6	8–4	10–3	7–6	6–6	—	8–4	4–9	6–6	5–7	8–4	8–5
Minnesota	4–8	7–5	7–6	5–8	6–6	3–9	7–6	4–8	—	4–8	4–9	9–4	5–8	5–7
New York	7–6	6–7	7–5	4–8	7–6	8–5	6–6	9–4	8–4	—	8–4	7–5	7–5	7–6
Oakland	4–8	4–8	8–5	5–8	5–7	6–6	6–7	6–6	9–4	4–8	—	9–4	2–11	6–6
Seattle	4–8	5–7	7–6	1–12	4–8	4–8	5–8	7–5	4–9	5–7	4–9	—	6–7	4–8
Texas	3–9	5–7	7–6	5–8	9–3	4–8	5–8–1	4–8	8–5	5–7	11–2	7–6	—	4–8
Toronto	6–7	6–7	8–4	7–5	9–4	7–6	6–6	5–8	7–5	6–7	6–6	8–4	8–4	—

=== Notable transactions ===
- June 6, 1983: 1983 Major League Baseball draft
  - Greg Cadaret was drafted by the Athletics in the 11th round. Player signed June 11, 1983.
  - Rob Nelson was drafted by the Athletics in the 1st round (7th pick) of the Secondary Phase.
- June 15, 1983: Matt Keough was traded by the Athletics to the New York Yankees for Ben Callahan, Marshall Brant, and cash.
- July 22, 1983: Kelvin Moore was traded by the Athletics to the New York Mets for Scott Dye (minors).

=== Roster ===
1983 Oakland Athletics
Roster
Pitchers: 55 Keith Atherton; 36 Steve Baker; 33 Dave Beard; 53 Bert Bradley; 39 Tom Burgmeier; 48 Ben Callahan; 23 Chris Codiroli; 24,37 Tim Conroy; 40 Ed Farmer; 13 Gorman Heimueller; 38 Jeff Jones; 27 Matt Keough; 32 Bill Krueger; 22 Rick Langford; 54 Steve McCatty; 17 Mike Norris; 49 Mark Smith; 31 Tom Underwood; 43 Mike Warren; 45 Rich Wortham; 29 Curt Young	Catchers: 9 Darryl Cias; 2 Mike Heath; 30 Bob Kearney; Infielders: 34 Bill Almon; 19 Marshall Brant; 10 Wayne Gross; 25 Donnie Hill; 51 Dave Hudgens; 4 Carney Lansford; 15 Davey Lopes; 7 Dan Meyer; 25 Kelvin Moore; 18 Tony Phillips; 52 Luis Quiñones	Outfielders: 16 Mike Davis; 11 Garry Hancock; 35 Rickey Henderson; 47 Rusty McNealy; 21 Dwayne Murphy; 8 Rick Peters; Other batters: 3 Jeff Burroughs; 6 Mitchell Page	Manager: 14 Steve Boros; Coaches: 41 Clete Boyer (Third base); 45 Jackie Moore (First base); 44 Ed Nottle (Bullpen); 43 Ron Schueler (Pitching); 28 Billy Williams (Hitting)

== Player stats ==
=== Batting ===
==== Starters by position ====
Note: Pos = Position; G = Games played; AB = At bats; H = Hits; Avg. = Batting average; HR = Home runs; RBI = Runs batted in

Pos	Player	G	AB	H	Avg.	HR	RBI
C	Bob Kearney	108	298	76	.255	8	32
1B	Wayne Gross	136	339	79	.233	12	44
2B	Davey Lopes	147	494	137	.277	17	67
SS	Tony Phillips	148	412	102	.248	4	35
3B	Carney Lansford	80	299	92	.308	10	45
LF	Rickey Henderson	145	513	150	.292	9	48
CF	Dwayne Murphy	130	471	107	.227	17	75
RF	Mike Davis	128	443	122	.275	8	62
DH	Jeff Burroughs	121	401	108	.269	10	56

==== Other batters ====
Note: G = Games played; AB = At bats; H = Hits; Avg. = Batting average; HR = Home runs; RBI = Runs batted in

Player	G	AB	H	Avg.	HR	RBI
Bill Almon	143	451	120	.266	4	63
Mike Heath	96	345	97	.281	6	33
Garry Hancock	101	256	70	.273	8	30
Rick Peters	55	178	51	.287	0	20
Dan Meyer	69	169	32	.189	1	13
Donnie Hill	53	158	42	.266	2	15
Kelvin Moore	41	124	26	.210	5	16
Mitchell Page	57	79	19	.241	0	1
Luis Quiñones	19	42	8	.190	0	4
Darryl Cias	19	18	6	.333	0	1
Marshall Brant	5	14	2	.143	0	2
Dave Hudgens	6	7	1	.143	0	0
Rusty McNealy	15	4	0	.000	0	0

=== Pitching ===
==== Starting pitchers ====
Note: G = Games pitched; IP = Innings pitched; W = Wins; L = Losses; ERA = Earned run average; SO = Strikeouts

Player	G	IP	W	L	ERA	SO
Chris Codiroli	37	205.2	12	12	4.46	85
Bill Krueger	17	109.2	7	6	3.61	58
Mike Norris	16	88.2	4	5	3.76	63
Gorman Heimueller	16	83.2	3	5	4.41	31
Mike Warren	12	65.2	5	3	4.11	30
Rick Langford	7	20.0	0	4	12.15	2

==== Other pitchers ====
Note: G = Games pitched; IP = Innings pitched; W = Wins; L = Losses; ERA = Earned run average; SO = Strikeouts

Player	G	IP	W	L	ERA	SO
Steve McCatty	38	167.0	6	9	3.99	65
Tim Conroy	39	162.1	7	10	3.94	112
Tom Underwood	51	144.2	9	7	4.04	62
Matt Keough	14	44.0	2	3	5.52	28
Mark Smith	8	14.2	1	0	6.75	10
Ed Farmer	5	10.1	0	0	3.48	7
Ben Callahan	4	9.1	1	2	12.54	2
Curt Young	8	9.0	0	1	16.00	5

==== Relief pitchers ====
Note: G = Games pitched; W = Wins; L = Losses; SV = Saves; ERA = Earned run average; SO = Strikeouts

Player	G	W	L	SV	ERA	SO
Dave Beard	43	5	5	10	5.61	40
Tom Burgmeier	49	6	7	4	2.81	39
Steve Baker	35	3	3	5	4.33	23
Keith Atherton	29	2	5	4	2.77	40
Jeff Jones	13	1	1	0	5.76	14
Bert Bradley	6	0	0	0	6.48	3
Wayne Gross	1	0	0	0	0.00	0
Rich Wortham	1	0	0	0	inf	0

== Farm system ==
Level	Team	League	Manager
AAA	Tacoma Tigers	Pacific Coast League	Bob Didier
AA	Albany-Colonie A's	Eastern League	Pete Whisenant and Keith Lieppman
A	Modesto A's	California League	George Mitterwald
A	Madison Muskies	Midwest League	Brad Fischer
A-Short Season	Medford A's	Northwest League	Dennis Rogers
Rookie	Idaho Falls A's	Pioneer League	Keith Lieppman and Jim Nettles

LEAGUE CHAMPIONS: Medford
