= 1982 International League season =

- League: International League
- Sport: Baseball
- Duration: April 13 – September 10
- Games: 140
- Teams: 8

Regular season
- Season MVP: Tucker Ashford, Columbus Clippers

Governors' Cup Playoffs
- League champions: Tidewater Tides
- Runners-up: Rochester Red Wings

IL seasons
- ← 1981 1983 →

The 1982 International League was a Class AAA baseball season played between April 13 and September 10. Eight teams played a 140-game schedule, with the top four teams qualifying for the post-season.

The Tidewater Tides won the Governors' Cup, defeating the Rochester Red Wings in the final round of the playoffs.

== Teams ==
1982 International League
Team	City	MLB Affiliate	Stadium
Charleston Charlies	Charleston, West Virginia	Cleveland Indians	Watt Powell Park
Columbus Clippers	Columbus, Ohio	New York Yankees	Franklin County Stadium
Pawtucket Red Sox	Pawtucket, Rhode Island	Boston Red Sox	McCoy Stadium
Richmond Braves	Richmond, Virginia	Atlanta Braves	Parker Field
Rochester Red Wings	Rochester, New York	Baltimore Orioles	Silver Stadium
Syracuse Chiefs	Syracuse, New York	Toronto Blue Jays	MacArthur Stadium
Tidewater Tides	Norfolk, Virginia	New York Mets	Met Park
Toledo Mud Hens	Toledo, Ohio	Minnesota Twins	Lucas County Stadium

== Map of teams ==
International League teams

== Regular season ==
=== Summary ===
- The Richmond Braves finished with the best record in the league for the first time since 1967.

=== Standings ===
International League
Team	Win	Loss	%	GB
Richmond Braves	82	57	.590	–
Columbus Clippers	79	61	.564	3.5
Tidewater Tides	74	63	.540	7
Rochester Red Wings	72	68	.514	10.5
Pawtucket Red Sox	67	71	.486	14.5
Syracuse Chiefs	64	76	.457	18.5
Toledo Mud Hens	60	80	.429	22.5
Charleston Charlies	59	81	.421	23.5

== League Leaders ==
=== Batting leaders ===
Stat	Player	Total
AVG	Greg Wells, Toledo Mud Hens	.336
H	Greg Wells, Toledo Mud Hens	182
R	Paul Runge, Richmond Braves	106
2B	Tucker Ashford, Columbus Clippers	35
3B	Albert Hall, Richmond Braves	11
HR	Steve Balboni, Columbus Clippers	32
RBI	Greg Wells, Toledo Mud Hens	107
SB	Albert Hall, Richmond Braves	62

=== Pitching leaders ===
Stat	Player	Total
W	Craig McMurtry, Richmond Braves	17
ERA	Jim Lewis, Columbus Clippers	2.60
CG	Craig McMurtry, Richmond Braves; Jackson Todd, Syracuse Chiefs	8
SV	Dave Schoppee, Pawtucket Red Sox	15
SO	Don Cooper, Toledo Mud Hens	125
IP	Craig McMurtry, Richmond Braves	210

== Playoffs ==
- The Tidewater Tides won their third Governors' Cup, defeating the Rochester Red Wings in three games.
- In 1981, the final round was shortened to a best-of-three series due to poor weather conditions. This season, the final round was a back to a best-of-five series.

=== Playoff bracket ===
Semi-finals
1	Richmond	0
4	Rochester	3
2	Columbus	0
3	Tidewater	3

Governors' Cup
4	Rochester	0
3	Tidewater	3

== Awards ==
International League awards
Award name	Recipient
Most Valuable Player	Tucker Ashford, Columbus Clippers
Pitcher of the Year	Craig McMurtry, Richmond Braves
Rookie of the Year	Brook Jacoby, Richmond Braves
Manager of the Year	Eddie Haas, Richmond Braves

== All-star team ==
International League all-star team
Position	All-star
Catcher	Geno Petralli, Syracuse Chiefs
First base	Greg Wells, Toledo Mud Hens
Second base	Marty Barrett, Pawtucket Red Sox
Shortstop	Tony Fernández, Syracuse Chiefs
Third base	Tucker Ashford, Columbus Clippers
Outfield	Garry Hancock, Pawtucket Red Sox; Don Mattingly, Columbus Clippers; John Shelby, Rochester Red Wings
Designated hitter	Marshall Brant, Columbus Clippers
Starting pitcher	Craig McMurtry, Richmond Braves
Relief pitcher	Curt Kaufman, Columbus Clippers
Manager	Eddie Haas, Richmond Braves

== See also ==
- 1982 Major League Baseball season
