= 1977 International League season =

- League: International League
- Sport: Baseball
- Duration: April 15 – September 15
- Games: 140
- Teams: 8

Regular season
- Season MVP: Ted Cox, Pawtucket Red Sox

Governors' Cup Playoffs
- League champions: Charleston Charlies
- Runners-up: Pawtucket Red Sox

IL seasons
- ← 1976 1978 →

The 1977 International League was a Class AAA baseball season played between April 15 and September 15. Eight teams played a 140-game schedule, with the top four teams qualifying for the post-season.

The Charleston Charlies won the Governors' Cup, defeating the Pawtucket Red Sox in the final round of the playoffs.

== Team changes ==
- The Rhode Island Red Sox were renamed the Pawtucket Red Sox.
- The Charleston Charlies relocated to Columbus, Ohio and were renamed the Columbus Clippers. They remained affiliated with the Pittsburgh Pirates.
- The Memphis Blues relocated to Charleston, West Virginia and were renamed the Charleston Charlies. They remained affiliated with the Houston Astros.

== Teams ==
1977 International League
Team	City	MLB Affiliate	Stadium
Charleston Charlies	Charleston, West Virginia	Houston Astros	Watt Powell Park
Columbus Clippers	Columbus, Ohio	Pittsburgh Pirates	Franklin County Stadium
Pawtucket Red Sox	Pawtucket, Rhode Island	Boston Red Sox	McCoy Stadium
Richmond Braves	Richmond, Virginia	Atlanta Braves	Parker Field
Rochester Red Wings	Rochester, New York	Baltimore Orioles	Silver Stadium
Syracuse Chiefs	Syracuse, New York	New York Yankees	MacArthur Stadium
Tidewater Tides	Norfolk, Virginia	New York Mets	Met Park
Toledo Mud Hens	Toledo, Ohio	Cleveland Indians	Lucas County Stadium

== Map of teams ==
International League teams

== Regular season ==
=== Summary ===
- The Pawtucket Red Sox finished with the best record in the league for the first time in franchise history.

=== Standings ===
International League
Team	Win	Loss	%	GB
Pawtucket Red Sox	80	60	.571	–
Charleston Charlies	78	62	.557	2
Tidewater Tides	73	67	.521	7
Richmond Braves	71	69	.507	9
Syracuse Chiefs	70	70	.500	10
Rochester Red Wings	67	73	.479	13
Columbus Clippers	65	75	.464	15
Toledo Mud Hens	56	84	.400	34

== League Leaders ==
=== Batting leaders ===
Stat	Player	Total
AVG	Wayne Harer, Pawtucket Red Sox	.350
H	Mike Edwards, Columbus Clippers	157
R	Pepe Mangual, Tidewater Tides	95
2B	Dale Murphy, Richmond Braves; Larry Wolfe, Charleston Charlies	33
3B	Dave Augustine, Columbus Clippers	10
HR	Terry Crowley, Rochester Red Wings	30
RBI	Dale Murphy, Richmond Braves	90
SB	Mike Edwards, Columbus Clippers	62

=== Pitching leaders ===
Stat	Player	Total
W	Larry McCall, Syracuse Chiefs	16
ERA	Tom Dixon, Charleston Charlies	2.25
CG	Mike Parrott, Rochester Red Wings	15
SV	Mardie Cornejo, Tidewater Tides	14
SO	Mike Parrott, Rochester Red Wings	146
IP	Mickey Mahler, Richmond Braves	217

== Playoffs ==
- The Charleston Charlies won their first Governors' Cup, defeating the Pawtucket Red Sox in four games.
- The final round of the playoffs was expanded from a best-of-five series to a best-of-seven.

=== Playoff bracket ===
Semi-finals
1	Pawtucket	3
4	Richmond	1
2	Charleston	3
3	Tidewater	1

Governors' Cup
1	Pawtucket	0
2	Charleston	4

== Awards ==
International League awards
Award name	Recipient
Most Valuable Player	Ted Cox, Pawtucket Red Sox
Pitcher of the Year	Mike Parrott, Rochester Red Wings
Rookie of the Year	Dale Murphy, Richmond Braves
Manager of the Year	Joe Morgan, Pawtucket Red Sox

== All-star team ==
International League all-star team
Position	All-star
Catcher	Dale Murphy, Richmond Braves
First base	Terry Crowley, Rochester Red Wings
Second base	Mike Edwards, Columbus Clippers
Shortstop	Greg Pryor, Syracuse Chiefs
Third base	Ted Cox, Pawtucket Red Sox
Outfield	J.J. Cannon, Columbus Clippers; Larry Harlow, Rochester Red Wings; Darryl Jones, Syracuse Chiefs
Pitcher	Larry McCall, Syracuse Chiefs; Mickey Mahler, Richmond Braves
Manager	Joe Morgan, Pawtucket Red Sox

== See also ==
- 1977 Major League Baseball season
