= 1981 International League season =

- League: International League
- Sport: Baseball
- Duration: April 10 – September 16
- Games: 140
- Teams: 8

Regular season
- Season MVP: Brett Butler, Richmond Braves

Governors' Cup Playoffs
- League champions: Columbus Clippers
- Runners-up: Richmond Braves

IL seasons
- ← 1980 1982 →

The 1981 International League was a Class AAA baseball season played between April 10 and September 16. Eight teams played a 140-game schedule, with the top four teams qualifying for the post-season.

The Columbus Clippers won the Governors' Cup, defeating the Richmond Braves in the final round of the playoffs.

== Team changes ==
- The Charleston Charlies ended their affiliation with the Texas Rangers and began a new affiliation with the Cleveland Indians.

== Teams ==
1981 International League
| Team | City | MLB Affiliate | Stadium |
| Charleston Charlies | Charleston, West Virginia | Cleveland Indians | Watt Powell Park |
| Columbus Clippers | Columbus, Ohio | New York Yankees | Franklin County Stadium |
| Pawtucket Red Sox | Pawtucket, Rhode Island | Boston Red Sox | McCoy Stadium |
| Richmond Braves | Richmond, Virginia | Atlanta Braves | Parker Field |
| Rochester Red Wings | Rochester, New York | Baltimore Orioles | Silver Stadium |
| Syracuse Chiefs | Syracuse, New York | Toronto Blue Jays | MacArthur Stadium |
| Tidewater Tides | Norfolk, Virginia | New York Mets | Met Park |
| Toledo Mud Hens | Toledo, Ohio | Minnesota Twins | Lucas County Stadium |

== Map of teams ==
International League teams

== Regular season ==
=== Summary ===
- The Columbus Clippers finished with the best record in the league for the third consecutive season.

=== Standings ===
International League
| Team | Win | Loss | % | GB |
|---|---|---|---|---|
| Columbus Clippers | 88 | 51 | .633 | – |
| Richmond Braves | 83 | 56 | .597 | 5 |
| Tidewater Tides | 70 | 68 | .507 | 17.5 |
| Rochester Red Wings | 69 | 70 | .496 | 19 |
| Charleston Charlies | 67 | 72 | .482 | 21 |
| Pawtucket Red Sox | 67 | 73 | .479 | 21.5 |
| Syracuse Chiefs | 60 | 80 | .429 | 28.5 |
| Toledo Mud Hens | 53 | 87 | .379 | 35.5 |

== League Leaders ==
=== Batting leaders ===
| Stat | Player | Total |
|---|---|---|
| AVG | Wade Boggs, Pawtucket Red Sox | .335 |
| H | Wade Boggs, Pawtucket Red Sox | 167 |
| R | Brett Butler, Richmond Braves | 93 |
| 2B | Wade Boggs, Pawtucket Red Sox | 41 |
| 3B | J.J. Cannon, Syracuse Chiefs | 11 |
| HR | Steve Balboni, Columbus Clippers | 33 |
| RBI | Steve Balboni, Columbus Clippers | 98 |
| SB | Dallas Williams, Rochester Red Wings | 51 |

=== Pitching leaders ===
| Stat | Player | Total |
|---|---|---|
| W | Ken Dayley, Richmond Braves; Larry McWilliams, Richmond Braves | 13 |
| ERA | Bob Ojeda, Pawtucket Red Sox | 2.13 |
| CG | Tom Brennan, Charleston Charlies; Tom Dixon, Tidewater Tides | 11 |
| SV | Dale Murray, Syracuse Chiefs | 16 |
| SO | Ken Dayley, Richmond Braves | 162 |
| IP | Ken Dayley, Richmond Braves | 200 |

== Playoffs ==
- The Columbus Clippers won their third consecutive Governors' Cup, defeating the Richmond Braves in three games.
- The Clippers became the first team in the league to win three straight Governors' Cups and the first team since the Rochester Red Wings from 1928 to 1931 to win at least three consecutive titles.
- The final round was shortened to a best-of-three series due to poor weather. There were a total of 10 rainouts during the post-season.

=== Playoff bracket ===
Semi-finals
1 | Columbus | 3
4 | Rochester | 2
2 | Richmond | 3
3 | Tidewater | 2

Governors' Cup
1 | Columbus | 2
2 | Richmond | 1

== Awards ==
International League awards
| Award name | Recipient |
|---|---|
| Most Valuable Player | Brett Butler, Richmond Braves |
| Pitcher of the Year | Bob Ojeda, Pawtucket Red Sox |
| Rookie of the Year | Cal Ripken Jr., Rochester Red Wings |
| Manager of the Year | Eddie Haas, Richmond Braves |

== All-star team ==
International League all-star team
| Position | All-star |
|---|---|
| Catcher | Chris Bando, Charleston Charlies |
| First base | Greg Wells, Syracuse Chiefs |
| Second base | Brian Giles, Tidewater Tides |
| Shortstop | Andre Robertson, Columbus Clippers |
| Third base | Cal Ripken Jr., Rochester Red Wings |
| Outfield | Sam Bowen, Pawtucket Red Sox; Brett Butler, Richmond Braves; Gary Rajsich, Tidewater Tides |
| Designated hitter | Steve Balboni, Columbus Clippers |
| Pitcher | Dale Murray, Syracuse Chiefs; Bob Ojeda, Pawtucket Red Sox |
| Manager | Eddie Haas, Richmond Braves |

== See also ==
- 1981 Major League Baseball season
