= 1980 International League season =

- League: International League
- Sport: Baseball
- Duration: April 16 – September 12
- Games: 140
- Teams: 8

Regular season
- Season MVP: Marshall Brant, Columbus Clippers

Governors' Cup Playoffs
- League champions: Columbus Clippers
- Runners-up: Toledo Mud Hens

IL seasons
- ← 1979 1981 →

The 1980 International League was a Class AAA baseball season played between April 16 and September 12. Eight teams played a 140-game schedule, with the top four teams qualifying for the post-season.

The Columbus Clippers won the Governors' Cup, defeating the Toledo Mud Hens in the final round of the playoffs.

== Team changes ==
- The Charleston Charlies ended their affiliation with the Houston Astros and began a new affiliation with the Texas Rangers.

== Teams ==
1980 International League
Team	City	MLB Affiliate	Stadium
Charleston Charlies	Charleston, West Virginia	Texas Rangers	Watt Powell Park
Columbus Clippers	Columbus, Ohio	New York Yankees	Franklin County Stadium
Pawtucket Red Sox	Pawtucket, Rhode Island	Boston Red Sox	McCoy Stadium
Richmond Braves	Richmond, Virginia	Atlanta Braves	Parker Field
Rochester Red Wings	Rochester, New York	Baltimore Orioles	Silver Stadium
Syracuse Chiefs	Syracuse, New York	Toronto Blue Jays	MacArthur Stadium
Tidewater Tides	Norfolk, Virginia	New York Mets	Met Park
Toledo Mud Hens	Toledo, Ohio	Minnesota Twins	Lucas County Stadium

== Map of teams ==
International League teams

== Regular season ==
=== Summary ===
- The Columbus Clippers finished with the best record in the league for the second consecutive season.

=== Standings ===
International League
Team	Win	Loss	%	GB
Columbus Clippers	83	57	.593	–
Toledo Mud Hens	77	63	.550	6
Rochester Red Wings	74	65	.532	8.5
Richmond Braves	69	71	.493	14
Charleston Charlies	67	71	.486	15
Tidewater Tides	67	72	.482	15.5
Pawtucket Red Sox	62	77	.446	20.5
Syracuse Chiefs	58	81	.417	24.5

== League Leaders ==
=== Batting leaders ===
Stat	Player	Total
AVG	Dave Engle, Toledo Mud Hens	.307
H	Mookie Wilson, Tidewater Tides	152
R	Mookie Wilson, Tidewater Tides	92
2B	John Valle, Rochester Red Wings; Ron Washington, Toledo Mud Hens	31
3B	Mookie Wilson, Tidewater Tides	14
HR	Marshall Brant, Columbus Clippers	23
RBI	Marshall Brant, Columbus Clippers	92
SB	Eddie Miller, Richmond Braves	60

=== Pitching leaders ===
Stat	Player	Total
W	Bob Kammeyer, Columbus Clippers	15
ERA	Ken Clay, Columbus Clippers	1.96
CG	John Butcher, Charleston Charlies	14
SV	Bob Babock, Charleston Charlies; Butch Metzger, Richmond Braves	14
SO	Juan Berenguer, Tidewater Tides	178
IP	Tony Brizzolara, Richmond Braves	206

== Playoffs ==
- The Columbus Clippers won their second consecutive Governors' Cup, defeating the Toledo Mud Hens in five games.

=== Playoff bracket ===
Semi-finals
1	Columbus	3
4	Richmond	2
2	Toledo	3
3	Rochester	1

Governors' Cup
1	Columbus	4
2	Toledo	1

== Awards ==
International League awards
Award name	Recipient
Most Valuable Player	Marshall Brant, Columbus Clippers
Pitcher of the Year	Bob Kammeyer, Columbus Clippers
Rookie of the Year	Bobby Bonner, Rochester Red Wings
Manager of the Year	Joe Altobelli, Columbus Clippers

== All-star team ==
International League all-star team
Position	All-star
Catcher	Ray Smith, Toledo Mud Hens
First base	Marshall Brant, Columbus Clippers
Second base	Mike Richardt, Charleston Charlies
Shortstop	Bobby Bonner, Rochester Red Wings
Third base	Tucker Ashford, Charleston Charlies
Outfield	Dave Engle, Toledo Mud Hens; Greg Johnston, Toledo Mud Hens; Mookie Wilson, Tidewater Tides
Designated hitter	John Valle, Rochester Red Wings
Pitcher	Bob Babcock, Charleston Charlies; Bob Kammeyer, Columbus Clippers
Manager	Joe Altobelli, Columbus Clippers

== See also ==
- 1980 Major League Baseball season
