= 1979 International League season =

- League: International League
- Sport: Baseball
- Duration: April 11 – September 15
- Games: 140
- Teams: 8

Regular season
- Season MVP: Bobby Brown, Columbus Clippers; Dave Stapleton, Pawtucket Red Sox

Governors' Cup Playoffs
- League champions: Columbus Clippers
- Runners-up: Syracuse Chiefs

IL seasons
- ← 1978 1980 →

The 1979 International League was a Class AAA baseball season played between April 11 and September 15. Eight teams played a 140-game schedule, with the top four teams qualifying for the post-season.

The Columbus Clippers won the Governors' Cup, defeating the Syracuse Chiefs in the final round of the playoffs.

== Team changes ==
- The Columbus Clippers ended their affiliation with the Pittsburgh Pirates and began a new affiliation with the New York Yankees.

== Teams ==
1979 International League
| Team | City | MLB Affiliate | Stadium |
| Charleston Charlies | Charleston, West Virginia | Houston Astros | Watt Powell Park |
| Columbus Clippers | Columbus, Ohio | New York Yankees | Franklin County Stadium |
| Pawtucket Red Sox | Pawtucket, Rhode Island | Boston Red Sox | McCoy Stadium |
| Richmond Braves | Richmond, Virginia | Atlanta Braves | Parker Field |
| Rochester Red Wings | Rochester, New York | Baltimore Orioles | Silver Stadium |
| Syracuse Chiefs | Syracuse, New York | Toronto Blue Jays | MacArthur Stadium |
| Tidewater Tides | Norfolk, Virginia | New York Mets | Met Park |
| Toledo Mud Hens | Toledo, Ohio | Minnesota Twins | Lucas County Stadium |

== Map of teams ==
International League teams

== Regular season ==
=== Summary ===
- The Columbus Clippers finished with the best record in the league for the first time in franchise history.

=== Standings ===
International League
| Team | Win | Loss | % | GB |
|---|---|---|---|---|
| Columbus Clippers | 85 | 54 | .612 | – |
| Syracuse Chiefs | 77 | 63 | .550 | 8.5 |
| Richmond Braves | 76 | 64 | .543 | 9.5 |
| Tidewater Tides | 73 | 67 | .521 | 12.5 |
| Pawtucket Red Sox | 66 | 74 | .471 | 19.5 |
| Charleston Charlies | 65 | 74 | .468 | 20 |
| Toledo Mud Hens | 63 | 76 | .453 | 22 |
| Rochester Red Wings | 53 | 86 | .381 | 32 |

== League Leaders ==
=== Batting leaders ===
| Stat | Player | Total |
|---|---|---|
| AVG | Garry Hancock, Pawtucket Red Sox | .325 |
| H | Dave Stapleton, Pawtucket Red Sox | 169 |
| R | Dave Stapleton, Pawtucket Red Sox | 88 |
| 2B | Dave Stapleton, Pawtucket Red Sox | 33 |
| 3B | Eddie Miller, Richmond Braves | 11 |
| HR | Sam Bowen, Pawtucket Red Sox | 28 |
| RBI | Sam Bowen, Pawtucket Red Sox; Jerry Keller, Richmond Braves | 75 |
| SB | Eddie Miller, Richmond Braves | 76 |

=== Pitching leaders ===
| Stat | Player | Total |
|---|---|---|
| W | Bob Kammeyer, Columbus Clippers | 16 |
| ERA | Scott Holman, Tidewater Tides | 1.99 |
| CG | Tommy Boggs, Richmond Braves | 16 |
| SV | Rick Anderson, Columbus Clippers | 21 |
| SO | Tommy Boggs, Richmond Braves | 138 |
| IP | Tommy Boggs, Richmond Braves | 227 |

== Playoffs ==
- The Columbus Clippers won their first Governors' Cup, defeating the Syracuse Chiefs in seven games.

=== Playoff bracket ===
Semi-finals
1 | Columbus | 3
4 | Tidewater | 1
2 | Syracuse | 3
3 | Richmond | 2

Governors' Cup
1 | Columbus | 4
2 | Syracuse | 3

== Awards ==
International League awards
| Award name | Recipient |
|---|---|
| Most Valuable Player | Bobby Brown, Columbus Clippers; Dave Stapleton, Pawtucket Red Sox |
| Pitcher of the Year | Rick Anderson, Columbus Clippers |
| Rookie of the Year | Mookie Wilson, Tidewater Tides |
| Manager of the Year | Vern Benson, Syracuse Chiefs |

== All-star team ==
International League all-star team
| Position | All-star |
|---|---|
| Catcher | Brad Gulden, Columbus Clippers |
| First base | Tom Chism, Rochester Red Wings |
| Second base | Roger Holt, Columbus Clippers |
| Shortstop | Glenn Hoffman, Pawtucket Red Sox |
| Third base | Dave Stapleton, Pawtucket Red Sox |
| Outfield | Sam Bowen, Pawtucket Red Sox; Bobby Brown, Columbus Clippers; Mookie Wilson, Tidewater Tides |
| Pitcher | Rick Anderson, Columbus Clippers; Tommy Boggs, Richmond Braves |
| Manager | Vern Benson, Syracuse Chiefs |

== See also ==
- 1979 Major League Baseball season
