= 1978 International League season =

- League: International League
- Sport: Baseball
- Duration: April 14 – September 16
- Games: 140
- Teams: 8

Regular season
- Season MVP: Gary Allenson, Pawtucket Red Sox

Governors' Cup Playoffs
- League champions: Richmond Braves
- Runners-up: Pawtucket Red Sox

IL seasons
- ← 1977 1979 →

The 1978 International League was a Class AAA baseball season played between April 14 and September 16. Eight teams played a 140-game schedule, with the top four teams qualifying for the post-season.

The Richmond Braves won the Governors' Cup, defeating the Pawtucket Red Sox in the final round of the playoffs.

== Team changes ==
- The Syracuse Chiefs ended their affiliation with the New York Yankees and began a new affiliation with the Toronto Blue Jays.
- The Toledo Mud Hens ended their affiliation with the Cleveland Indians and began a new affiliation with the Minnesota Twins.

== Teams ==
1978 International League
Team	City	MLB Affiliate	Stadium
Charleston Charlies	Charleston, West Virginia	Houston Astros	Watt Powell Park
Columbus Clippers	Columbus, Ohio	Pittsburgh Pirates	Franklin County Stadium
Pawtucket Red Sox	Pawtucket, Rhode Island	Boston Red Sox	McCoy Stadium
Richmond Braves	Richmond, Virginia	Atlanta Braves	Parker Field
Rochester Red Wings	Rochester, New York	Baltimore Orioles	Silver Stadium
Syracuse Chiefs	Syracuse, New York	Toronto Blue Jays	MacArthur Stadium
Tidewater Tides	Norfolk, Virginia	New York Mets	Met Park
Toledo Mud Hens	Toledo, Ohio	Minnesota Twins	Lucas County Stadium

== Map of teams ==
International League teams

== Regular season ==
=== Summary ===
- The Charleston Charlies finished with the best record in the league for the first time since 1973.

=== Standings ===
International League
Team	Win	Loss	%	GB
Charleston Charlies	85	55	.607	–
Pawtucket Red Sox	81	59	.579	4
Toledo Mud Hens	74	66	.529	11
Richmond Braves	71	68	.511	13.5
Tidewater Tides	69	71	.493	16
Rochester Red Wings	68	72	.486	17
Columbus Clippers	61	78	.439	23.5
Syracuse Chiefs	50	90	.357	35

== League Leaders ==
=== Batting leaders ===
Stat	Player	Total
AVG	Mike Easler, Columbus Clippers	.330
H	Keith Drumright, Charleston Charlies	159
R	Wayne Krenchicki, Rochester Red Wings	93
2B	Gary Woods, Syracuse Chiefs	33
3B	J.J. Cannon, Charleston Charlies	18
HR	Hank Small, Richmond Braves	25
RBI	Hank Small, Richmond Braves	101
SB	Eddie Miller, Richmond Braves	36

=== Pitching leaders ===
Stat	Player	Total
W	Dan Larson, Charleston Charlies; Gary Wilson, Charleston Charlies	14
ERA	Frank Riccelli, Charleston Charlies	2.78
CG	Davis May, Toledo Mud Hens	11
SV	John LaRose, Pawtucket Red Sox	15
SO	Odell Jones, Columbus Clippers	169
IP	Dan Larson, Charleston Charlies	202

== Playoffs ==
- The Richmond Braves won their first Governors' Cup, defeating the Pawtucket Red Sox in six games.

=== Playoff bracket ===
Semi-finals
1	Charleston	1
4	Richmond	3
2	Pawtucket	3
3	Toledo	2

Governors' Cup
4	Richmond	4
2	Pawtucket	2

== Awards ==
International League awards
Award name	Recipient
Most Valuable Player	Gary Allenson, Pawtucket Red Sox
Pitcher of the Year	Juan Berenguer, Tidewater Tides
Rookie of the Year	Glenn Hubbard, Richmond Braves
Manager of the Year	Jim Beauchamp, Charleston Charlies

== All-star team ==
International League all-star team
Position	All-star
Catcher	Gary Allenson, Pawtucket Red Sox
First base	Hank Small, Richmond Braves
Second base	Glenn Hubbard, Richmond Braves
Shortstop	Dale Berra, Columbus Clippers
Third base	Rob Sperring, Charleston Charlies
Outfield	Dave Coleman, Pawtucket Red Sox; Mike Easler, Columbus Clippers; Alvis Woods, Syracuse Chiefs
Pitcher	John LaRose, Pawtucket Red Sox; Dan Larson, Charleston Charlies
Manager	Jim Beauchamp, Charleston Charlies

== See also ==
- 1978 Major League Baseball season
