= 1976 International League season =

- League: International League
- Sport: Baseball
- Duration: April 16 – September 11
- Games: 140
- Teams: 8

Regular season
- Season MVP: Rich Dauer, Rochester Red Wings; Mickey Klutts, Syracuse Chiefs; Joe Lis, Toledo Mud Hens

Governors' Cup Playoffs
- League champions: Syracuse Chiefs
- Runners-up: Richmond Braves

IL seasons
- ← 1975 1977 →

The 1976 International League was a Class AAA baseball season played between April 16 and September 11. Eight teams played a 140-game schedule, with the top four teams qualifying for the post-season.

The Syracuse Chiefs won the Governors' Cup, defeating the Richmond Braves in the final round of the playoffs.

== Team changes ==
- The Pawtucket Red Sox were renamed the Rhode Island Red Sox.
- The Memphis Blues ended their affiliation with the Montreal Expos and began a new affiliation with the Houston Astros.
- The Toledo Mud Hens ended their affiliation with the Philadelphia Phillies and began a new affiliation with the Cleveland Indians.

== Teams ==
1976 International League
Team	City	MLB Affiliate	Stadium
Charleston Charlies	Charleston, West Virginia	Pittsburgh Pirates	Watt Powell Park
Memphis Blues	Memphis, Tennessee	Houston Astros	Blues Stadium
Rhode Island Red Sox	Pawtucket, Rhode Island	Boston Red Sox	McCoy Stadium
Richmond Braves	Richmond, Virginia	Atlanta Braves	Parker Field
Rochester Red Wings	Rochester, New York	Baltimore Orioles	Silver Stadium
Syracuse Chiefs	Syracuse, New York	New York Yankees	MacArthur Stadium
Tidewater Tides	Norfolk, Virginia	New York Mets	Met Park
Toledo Mud Hens	Toledo, Ohio	Cleveland Indians	Lucas County Stadium

== Map of teams ==
International League teams

== Regular season ==
=== Summary ===
- The Rochester Red Wings finished with the best record in the league for the first time since 1971.
- For the first time in league history, three players were named co-winners of the International League Most Valuable Player Award. The players winning the award were Rich Dauer of the Rochester Red Wings, Mickey Klutts of the Syracuse Chiefs and Joe Lis of the Toledo Mud Hens.

=== Standings ===
International League
Team	Win	Loss	%	GB
Rochester Red Wings	88	50	.638	–
Syracuse Chiefs	82	57	.590	6.5
Memphis Blues	69	69	.500	19
Richmond Braves	69	71	.493	20
Rhode Island Red Sox	68	70	.493	20
Charleston Charlies	62	73	.459	24.5
Tidewater Tides	60	78	.435	28
Toledo Mud Hens	55	85	.393	34

== League Leaders ==
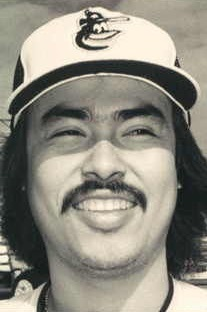
Dennis Martínez of the Rochester Red Wings won the International League Pitcher of the Year Award after leading the league in wins, ERA, complete games and strikeouts.

=== Batting leaders ===
Stat	Player	Total
AVG	Rich Dauer, Rochester Red Wings	.336
H	Rich Dauer, Rochester Red Wings	176
R	Joe Lis, Toledo Mud Hens	93
2B	Fernando González, Charleston Charlies	31
3B	Kiko Garcia, Rochester Red Wings	10
HR	Jack Baker, Rhode Island Red Sox	36
RBI	Joe Lis, Toledo Mud Hens	103
SB	Miguel Diloné, Charleston Charlies	61

=== Pitching leaders ===
Stat	Player	Total
W	Dennis Martínez, Rochester Red Wings	14
ERA	Dennis Martínez, Rochester Red Wings	2.50
CG	Dennis Martínez, Rochester Red Wings	16
SV	Rick Baldwin, Tidewater Tides	14
SO	Dennis Martínez, Rochester Red Wings	140
IP	Jackson Todd, Tidewater Tides	201

== Playoffs ==
- The Syracuse Chiefs won their eighth Governors' Cup, defeating the Richmond Braves in four games.

=== Playoff bracket ===
Semi-finals
1	Rochester	1
4	Richmond	3
2	Syracuse	3
3	Memphis	0

Governors' Cup
4	Richmond	1
2	Syracuse	3

== Awards ==
International League awards
Award name	Recipient
Most Valuable Player	Rich Dauer, Rochester Red Wings; Mickey Klutts, Syracuse Chiefs; Joe Lis, Toledo Mud Hens
Pitcher of the Year	Dennis Martínez, Rochester Red Wings
Rookie of the Year	Rich Dauer, Rochester Red Wings
Manager of the Year	Joe Altobelli, Rochester Red Wings

== All-star team ==
International League all-star team
Position	All-star
Catcher	John Stearns, Tidewater Tides
First base	Joe Lis, Toledo Mud Hens
Second base	Rich Dauer, Rochester Red Wings
Shortstop	Mickey Klutts, Syracuse Chiefs
Third base	Butch Hobson, Rhode Island Red Sox
Outfield	Miguel Diloné, Charleston Charlies; Omar Moreno, Charleston Charlies; Terry Whitfield, Syracuse Chiefs
Right-handed pitcher	Dennis Martínez, Rochester Red Wings
Left-handed pitcher	Scott McGregor, Rochester / Syracuse
Manager	Joe Altobelli, Rochester Red Wings

== See also ==
- 1976 Major League Baseball season
