= 1974 International League season =

- League: International League
- Sport: Baseball
- Duration: April 19 – September 23
- Games: 144
- Teams: 8

Regular season
- Season MVP: Jim Rice, Pawtucket Red Sox

Governors' Cup Playoffs
- League champions: Rochester Red Wings
- Runners-up: Syracuse Chiefs

IL seasons
- ← 1973 1975 →

The 1974 International League was a Class AAA baseball season played between April 19 and September 23. Eight teams played a 144-game schedule, with the top two teams in each division qualifying for the post-season.

The Rochester Red Wings won the Governors' Cup, defeating the Syracuse Chiefs in the final round of the playoffs.

== Team changes ==
- The Peninsula Whips relocated to Memphis, Tennessee and were renamed the Memphis Blues. The club remained affiliated with the Montreal Expos.
- The Toledo Mud Hens ended their affiliation with the Detroit Tigers and began an affiliation with the Philadelphia Phillies.
- The divisions were renamed to Northern Division and Southern Division, as the league only had three American League team affiliates compared to five National League affiliates.

== Teams ==
1974 International League
| Division | Team | City | MLB Affiliate | Stadium |
Northern
| Northern | Pawtucket Red Sox | Pawtucket, Rhode Island | Boston Red Sox | McCoy Stadium |
| Northern | Rochester Red Wings | Rochester, New York | Baltimore Orioles | Silver Stadium |
| Northern | Syracuse Chiefs | Syracuse, New York | New York Yankees | MacArthur Stadium |
| Northern | Toledo Mud Hens | Toledo, Ohio | Philadelphia Phillies | Lucas County Stadium |
Southern
| Southern | Charleston Charlies | Charleston, West Virginia | Pittsburgh Pirates | Watt Powell Park |
| Southern | Memphis Blues | Memphis, Tennessee | Montreal Expos | Blues Stadium |
| Southern | Richmond Braves | Richmond, Virginia | Atlanta Braves | Parker Field |
| Southern | Tidewater Tides | Norfolk, Virginia | New York Mets | Met Park |

== Map of teams ==
Northern division Southern division

== Regular season ==
=== Summary ===
- The Memphis Blues finished with the best record in the league in their inaugural season.
- The regular season schedule changed from 146-games to 144-games.

=== Standings ===
Northern Division
| Team | Win | Loss | % | GB |
|---|---|---|---|---|
| Rochester Red Wings | 88 | 56 | .611 | – |
| Syracuse Chiefs | 74 | 70 | .514 | 14 |
| Toledo Mud Hens | 70 | 74 | .486 | 18 |
| Pawtucket Red Sox | 57 | 87 | .396 | 31 |

Southern Division
| Team | Win | Loss | % | GB |
|---|---|---|---|---|
| Memphis Blues | 87 | 55 | .613 | – |
| Richmond Braves | 75 | 65 | .536 | 11 |
| Charleston Charlies | 62 | 81 | .434 | 25.5 |
| Tidewater Tides | 57 | 82 | .410 | 28.5 |

== League Leaders ==
=== Batting leaders ===
| Stat | Player | Total |
|---|---|---|
| AVG | Jim Rice, Pawtucket Red Sox | .337 |
| H | Rob Andrews, Rochester Red Wings | 165 |
| R | Bob Beall, Richmond Braves | 105 |
| 2B | Larvell Blanks, Richmond Braves | 29 |
| 3B | Bill Flowers, Charleston Charlies | 8 |
| HR | Jim Rice, Pawtucket Red Sox | 25 |
| RBI | Jim Rice, Pawtucket Red Sox | 93 |
| SB | Pepe Mangual, Memphis Blues | 46 |

=== Pitching leaders ===
| Stat | Player | Total |
|---|---|---|
| W | Bill Kirkpatrick, Rochester Red Wings | 15 |
| ERA | Jamie Easterly, Richmond Braves | 2.54 |
| CG | Scott McGregor, Syracuse Chiefs | 12 |
| SV | Mickey Scott, Rochester Red Wings | 17 |
| SO | Jim Burton, Pawtucket Red Sox | 146 |
| IP | Scott McGregor, Syracuse Chiefs | 199 |

== Playoffs ==
- The Rochester Red Wings won their seventh Governors' Cup, defeating the Syracuse Chiefs in seven games.
- The semi-finals and finals were expanded from a best-of-five series to a best-of-seven series.

=== Playoff bracket ===
Semi-finals
N1 | Rochester | 4
S1 | Memphis | 2
N2 | Syracuse | 4
S2 | Richmond | 1

Governors' Cup
N1 | Rochester | 4
N2 | Syracuse | 3

== Awards ==
International League awards
| Award name | Recipient |
|---|---|
| Most Valuable Player | Jim Rice, Pawtucket Red Sox |
| Pitcher of the Year | Scott McGregor, Syracuse Chiefs |
| Rookie of the Year | Jim Rice, Pawtucket Red Sox |
| Manager of the Year | Karl Kuehl, Memphis Blues |

== See also ==
- 1974 Major League Baseball season
