= 1972 International League season =

- League: International League
- Sport: Baseball
- Duration: April 14 – September 12
- Games: 144
- Teams: 8

Regular season
- Season MVP: Dwight Evans, Louisville Colonels

Governors' Cup Playoffs
- League champions: Tidewater Tides
- Runners-up: Louisville Colonels

IL seasons
- ← 1971 1973 →

The 1972 International League was a Class AAA baseball season played between April 16 and September 13. Eight teams played a 144-game schedule, with the top four teams qualifying for the post-season.

The Tidewater Tides won the Governors' Cup, defeating the Louisville Colonels in the final round of the playoffs.

== Team changes ==
- The Winnipeg Whips relocated to Hampton, Virginia and were renamed the Peninsula Whips. The club remained affiliated with the Montreal Expos.

== Teams ==
1972 International League
Team	City	MLB Affiliate	Stadium
Charleston Charlies	Charleston, West Virginia	Pittsburgh Pirates	Watt Powell Park
Louisville Colonels	Louisville, Kentucky	Boston Red Sox	Fairgrounds Stadium
Peninsula Whips	Hampton, Virginia	Montreal Expos	War Memorial Stadium
Richmond Braves	Richmond, Virginia	Atlanta Braves	Parker Field
Rochester Red Wings	Rochester, New York	Baltimore Orioles	Silver Stadium
Syracuse Chiefs	Syracuse, New York	New York Yankees	MacArthur Stadium
Tidewater Tides	Norfolk, Virginia	New York Mets	Met Park
Toledo Mud Hens	Toledo, Ohio	Detroit Tigers	Lucas County Stadium

== Map of teams ==
International League teams

== Regular season ==
=== Summary ===
- The Louisville Colonels finished with the best record in the league for the first time in franchise history.
- The regular season was expanded from 140 games to 144 games.

=== Standings ===
International League
Team	Win	Loss	%	GB
Louisville Colonels	81	63	.563	–
Charleston Charlies	80	64	.556	1
Tidewater Tides	78	65	.545	2.5
Rochester Red Wings	76	68	.528	5
Toledo Mud Hens	75	69	.521	6
Richmond Braves	65	78	.455	15.5
Syracuse Chiefs	64	80	.444	17
Peninsula Whips	56	88	.389	25

== League Leaders ==
=== Batting leaders ===
Stat	Player	Total
AVG	Al Bumbry, Rochester Red Wings	.345
H	Cecil Cooper, Louisville Colonels	162
R	Pepe Mangual, Peninsula Whips	91
2B	Cecil Cooper, Louisville Colonels	31
3B	Al Bumbry, Rochester Red Wings	15
HR	Richie Zisk, Charleston Charlies	26
RBI	Dwight Evans, Louisville Colonels	95
SB	Pepe Mangual, Peninsula Whips	39

=== Pitching leaders ===
Stat	Player	Total
W	Craig Skok, Louisville Colonels	15
ERA	Gene Garber, Charleston Charlies	2.26
CG	Gene Garber, Charleston Charlies; Harry Parker, Tidewater Tides	13
SHO	Harry Parker, Tidewater Tides	5
SV	Dick Colpaert, Charleston Charlies	21
SO	Jim McKee, Charleston Charlies	159
IP	John Montague, Peninsula Whips	214.0

== Playoffs ==
- The Tidewater Tides won their first Governors' Cup, defeating the Louisville Colonels in five games.
- The semi-finals were reduced from a best-of-five series to a best-of-three series.
- The finals were reduced from a best-of-seven series to a best-of-five series.

=== Playoff bracket ===
Semi-finals
1	Louisville	2
4	Rochester	1
2	Charleston	1
3	Tidewater	2

Governors' Cup
1	Louisville	2
3	Tidewater	3

== Awards ==
International League awards
Award name	Recipient
Most Valuable Player	Dwight Evans, Louisville Colonels
Pitcher of the Year	Gene Garber, Charleston Charlies
Rookie of the Year	Al Bumbry, Rochester Red Wings
Manager of the Year	Hank Bauer, Tidewater Tides

== All-star team ==
International League all-star team
Position	All-star
Catcher	Vic Correll, Louisville Colonels
First base	Cecil Cooper, Louisville Colonels
Second base	Chuck Goggin, Charleston Charlies
Shortstop	Mario Guerrero, Louisville / Syracuse
Third base	Tom Matchick, Rochester Red Wings
Outfield	Al Bumbry, Rochester Red Wings; Dwight Evans, Louisville Colonels; Richie Zisk, Charleston Charlies
Pitcher	Gene Garber, Charleston Charlies; Craig Skok, Louisville Colonels
Manager	Hank Bauer, Tidewater Tides

== See also ==
- 1972 Major League Baseball season
