= 1973 International League season =

- League: International League
- Sport: Baseball
- Duration: April 13 – September 14
- Games: 146
- Teams: 8

Regular season
- Season MVP: Jim Fuller, Rochester Red Wings

Governors' Cup Playoffs
- League champions: Pawtucket Red Sox
- Runners-up: Charleston Charlies

IL seasons
- ← 1972 1974 →

The 1973 International League was a Class AAA baseball season played between April 16 and September 13. Eight teams played a 146-game schedule, with the top two teams in each division qualifying for the post-season.

The Pawtucket Red Sox won the Governors' Cup, defeating the Charleston Charlies in the final round of the playoffs.

== Team changes ==
- The Louisville Colonels relocated to Pawtucket, Rhode Island and were renamed the Pawtucket Red Sox. The club remained affiliated with the Boston Red Sox.
- The league realigned from one eight-team division to two four-team divisions, the American and National. American League affiliates played in the American Division and National League affiliates played in the National Division.

== Teams ==
1973 International League
Division	Team	City	MLB Affiliate	Stadium
American
American	Pawtucket Red Sox	Pawtucket, Rhode Island	Boston Red Sox	McCoy Stadium
American	Rochester Red Wings	Rochester, New York	Baltimore Orioles	Silver Stadium
American	Syracuse Chiefs	Syracuse, New York	New York Yankees	MacArthur Stadium
American	Toledo Mud Hens	Toledo, Ohio	Detroit Tigers	Lucas County Stadium
National
National	Charleston Charlies	Charleston, West Virginia	Pittsburgh Pirates	Watt Powell Park
National	Peninsula Whips	Hampton, Virginia	Montreal Expos	War Memorial Stadium
National	Richmond Braves	Richmond, Virginia	Atlanta Braves	Parker Field
National	Tidewater Tides	Norfolk, Virginia	New York Mets	Met Park

== Map of teams ==
American division National division

== Regular season ==
=== Summary ===
- The Charleston Charlies finished with the best record in the league for the first time in franchise history.
- The regular season schedule changed from 144-games to 146-games.

=== Standings ===
American Division
Team	Win	Loss	%	GB
Rochester Red Wings	79	67	.541	–
Pawtucket Red Sox	78	68	.534	1
Syracuse Chiefs	76	70	.521	3
Toledo Mud Hens	65	81	.445	14

National Division
Team	Win	Loss	%	GB
Charleston Charlies	85	60	.586	–
Tidewater Tides	75	70	.517	10
Peninsula Whips	72	74	.493	13.5
Richmond Braves	53	93	.363	32.5

== League Leaders ==
=== Batting leaders ===
Stat	Player	Total
AVG	Royle Stillman, Rochester Red Wings	.354
H	Mike Cummings, Pawtucket Red Sox	139
R	Rick Bladt, Syracuse Chiefs	97
2B	Bill McNulty, Tidewater Tides	30
3B	Rick Bladt, Syracuse Chiefs	10
HR	Jim Fuller, Rochester Red Wings	39
RBI	Jim Fuller, Rochester Red Wings	108
SB	Larry Lintz, Peninsula Whips	48

=== Pitching leaders ===
Stat	Player	Total
W	John Montague, Peninsula Whips	15
ERA	Dick Pole, Pawtucket Red Sox	2.03
CG	Dick Pole, Pawtucket Red Sox	16
SV	Joe Grzenda, Syracuse Chiefs	18
SO	Dick Pole, Pawtucket Red Sox	158
IP	Fred Holdsworth, Toledo Mud Hens	214.0

== Playoffs ==
- The Pawtucket Red Sox won their first Governors' Cup in their first season following their relocation, defeating the Charleston Charlies in five games.
- The semi-finals were expanded from a best-of-three series to a best-of-five series.

=== Playoff bracket ===
Semi-finals
A1	Rochester	0
N1	Charleston	3
A2	Pawtucket	3
N2	Tidewater	2

Governors' Cup
N1	Charleston	2
A2	Pawtucket	3

== Awards ==
International League awards
Award name	Recipient
Most Valuable Player	Jim Fuller, Rochester Red Wings
Pitcher of the Year	Dick Pole, Pawtucket Red Sox
Rookie of the Year	Otto Vélez, Syracuse Chiefs
Manager of the Year	Joe Morgan, Charleston Charlies

== See also ==
- 1973 Major League Baseball season
