= 1975 International League season =

- League: International League
- Sport: Baseball
- Duration: April 11 – September 10
- Games: 140
- Teams: 8

Regular season
- Season MVP: Mike Vail, Tidewater Tides

Governors' Cup Playoffs
- League champions: Tidewater Tides
- Runners-up: Syracuse Chiefs

IL seasons
- ← 1974 1976 →

The 1975 International League was a Class AAA baseball season played between April 11 and September 10. Eight teams played a 140-game schedule, with the top four teams qualifying for the post-season.

The Tidewater Tides won the Governors' Cup, defeating the Syracuse Chiefs in the final round of the playoffs.

== League changes ==
- The two-division format was scrapped and the traditional four-team playoff format returned.

== Teams ==
1975 International League
Team	City	MLB Affiliate	Stadium
Charleston Charlies	Charleston, West Virginia	Pittsburgh Pirates	Watt Powell Park
Memphis Blues	Memphis, Tennessee	Montreal Expos	Blues Stadium
Pawtucket Red Sox	Pawtucket, Rhode Island	Boston Red Sox	McCoy Stadium
Richmond Braves	Richmond, Virginia	Atlanta Braves	Parker Field
Rochester Red Wings	Rochester, New York	Baltimore Orioles	Silver Stadium
Syracuse Chiefs	Syracuse, New York	New York Yankees	MacArthur Stadium
Tidewater Tides	Norfolk, Virginia	New York Mets	Met Park
Toledo Mud Hens	Toledo, Ohio	Philadelphia Phillies	Lucas County Stadium

== Map of teams ==
International League teams

== Regular season ==
=== Summary ===
- The Tidewater Tides finished with the best record in the league for the first time since 1969.
- The Tidewater Tides defeated the Rochester Red Wings in a tie-breaking game for first place in the league.
- The regular season schedule changed from 144-games to 140-games.

=== Standings ===
International League
Team	Win	Loss	%	GB
Tidewater Tides	86	55	.610	–
Rochester Red Wings	85	56	.603	1
Syracuse Chiefs	72	64	.529	11.5
Charleston Charlies	72	67	.518	13
Memphis Blues	65	75	.464	20.5
Richmond Braves	62	75	.453	22
Toledo Mud Hens	62	78	.443	23.5
Pawtucket Red Sox	53	87	.379	32.5

== League Leaders ==
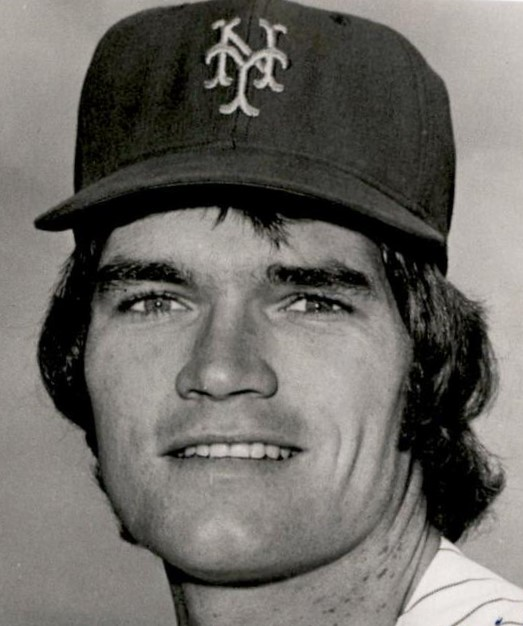
Mike Vail of the Tidewater Tides won the International League Most Valuable Player Award and was named to the International League All-Star team. He led the league in batting average, triples and runs batted in.

=== Batting leaders ===
Stat	Player	Total
AVG	Mike Vail, Tidewater Tides	.342
H	Ellis Valentine, Memphis Blues	151
R	Ellis Valentine, Memphis Blues	87
2B	Royle Stillman, Rochester Red Wings; Ellis Valentine, Memphis Blues	30
3B	Mike Vail, Tidewater Tides	9
HR	Bill Nahorodny, Toledo Mud Hens	19
RBI	Roy Staiger, Tidewater Tides	81
SB	Miguel Diloné, Charleston Charlies	48

=== Pitching leaders ===
Stat	Player	Total
W	Odell Jones, Charleston Charlies; Mike Willis, Rochester Red Wings	14
ERA	Pablo Torrealba, Richmond Braves	1.45
CG	Craig Swan, Tidewater Tides	13
SV	Pablo Torrealba, Richmond Braves	15
SO	Odell Jones, Charleston Charlies	157
IP	Odell Jones, Charleston Charlies	188

== Playoffs ==
- The Tidewater Tides won their second Governors' Cup, defeating the Syracuse Chiefs in four games.
- The semi-finals and finals were shortened from a best-of-seven series to a best-of-five series.

=== Playoff bracket ===
Semi-finals
1	Tidewater	3
4	Charleston	0
2	Rochester	1
3	Syracuse	3

Governors' Cup
1	Tidewater	3
3	Syracuse	1

== Awards ==
International League awards
Award name	Recipient
Most Valuable Player	Mike Vail, Tidewater Tides
Pitcher of the Year	Craig Swan, Tidewater Tides
Rookie of the Year	Mike Vail, Tidewater Tides
Manager of the Year	Joe Frazier, Tidewater Tides

== All-star team ==
International League all-star team
Position	All-star
Catcher	Bill Nahorodny, Toledo Mud Hens; Joe Nolan, Richmond Braves
First base	Brock Pemberton, Tidewater Tides
Second base	Willie Randolph, Charleston Charlies
Shortstop	Bob Bailor, Rochester Red Wings
Third base	Roy Staiger, Tidewater Tides
Outfield	Royle Stillman, Rochester Red Wings; Ellis Valentine, Memphis Blues; Mike Vail, Tidewater Tides
Pitcher	Mike Flanagan, Rochester Red Wings; Craig Swan, Tidewater Tides
Manager	Joe Frazier, Tidewater Tides

== See also ==
- 1975 Major League Baseball season
