= McNealy =

McNealy is a surname. Notable people with the surname include:

- Chris McNealy (born 1961), American basketball player
- Maverick McNealy (born 1995), American golfer
- Rusty McNealy (born 1958), American baseball player
- Scott McNealy (born 1954), American businessman
