= Boomer Wells =

Boomer Wells may refer to:

- David Wells (born 1963), American baseball pitcher nicknamed Boomer
- Greg Wells (baseball) (born 1954), American baseball first baseman nicknamed Boomer
