= Darryl Cias =

American baseball player (born 1957)

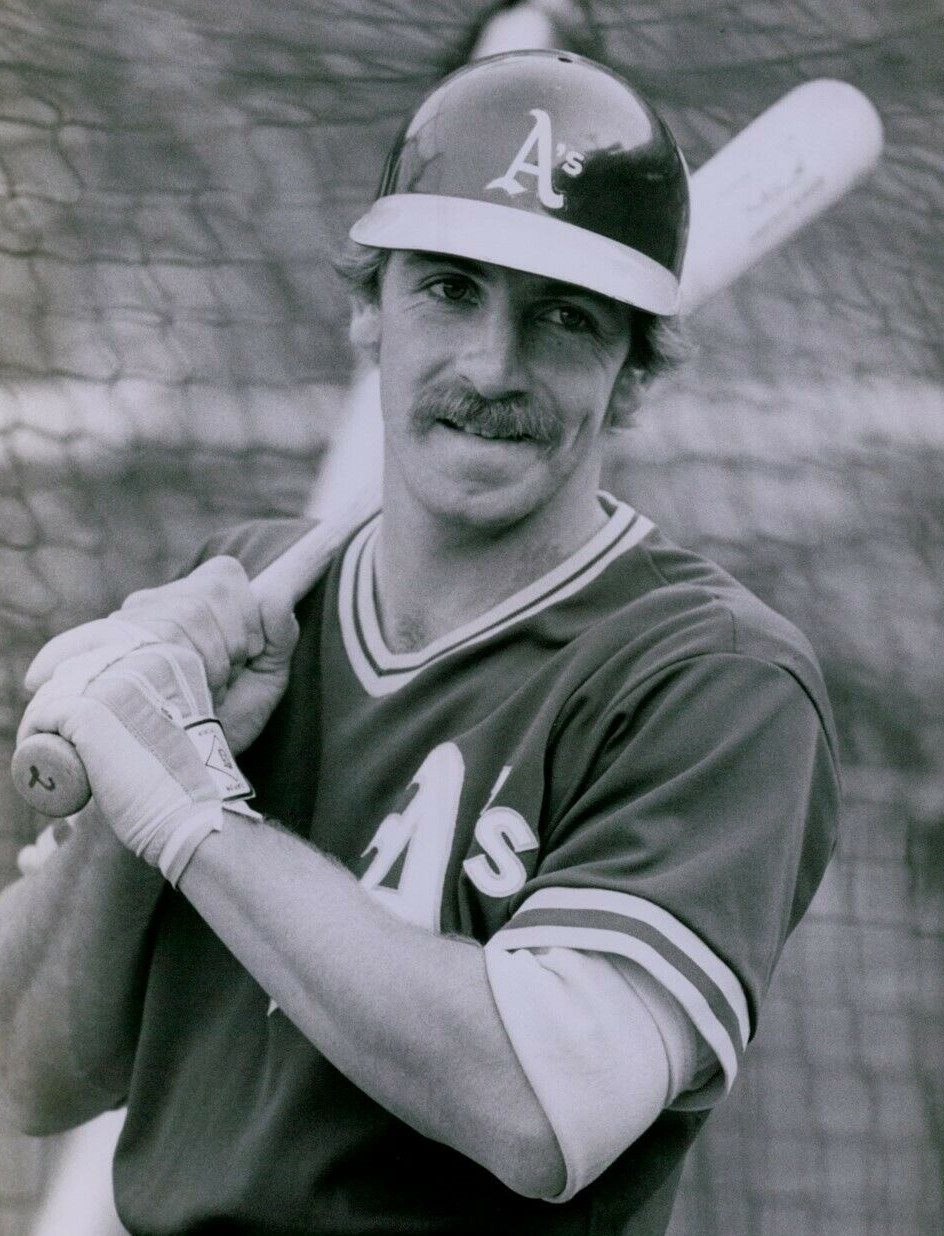
- Catcher
- Born: April 23, 1957 (age 69); New York, New York, U.S.
- Batted: Right Threw: Right

MLB debut
- April 27, 1983, for the Oakland Athletics

Last MLB appearance
- September 24, 1983, for the Oakland Athletics

MLB statistics
- Batting average: .333
- Home runs: 0
- Runs batted in: 1
- Stats at Baseball Reference

Teams
- Oakland Athletics (1983)

Darryl Richard Cias (born April 23, 1957) is an American former professional baseball player. He played 19 games in Major League Baseball for the Oakland Athletics in 1983, mostly as a late-inning replacement for starting catcher Bob Kearney. He played in the minor leagues from 1975 until 1986, including a stint with the Nettuno Baseball Club in the Italian Baseball League in 1985.
