= Ron Klimkowski =

American baseball player (1944-2009)

- Pitcher
- Born: March 1, 1944; Jersey City, New Jersey, U.S.
- Died: November 13, 2009 (aged 65); Plainview, New York, U.S.
- Batted: Right Threw: Right

MLB debut
- September 15, 1969, for the New York Yankees

Last MLB appearance
- September 22, 1972, for the New York Yankees

MLB statistics
- Win–loss record: 8–12
- Earned run average: 2.90
- Strikeouts: 79
- Stats at Baseball Reference

Teams
- New York Yankees (1969–1970); Oakland Athletics (1971); New York Yankees (1972)

Ronald Bernard Klimkowski (March 1, 1944 – November 13, 2009) was an American baseball player born in Jersey City, New Jersey. He was a right-handed Major League Baseball pitcher and junkball specialist. He played for the New York Yankees (1969–1970, 1972) and the Oakland Athletics (1971) during his career.

Klimkowski attended college at Morehead State University for only one year. He was the first graduate of W. T. Clarke High School in Westbury, New York to play in the major leagues.

== Career ==
Before the 1964 season, Ron Klimkowski was signed by the Boston Red Sox as an amateur free agent. On August 8, 1967, he was sent by the Boston Red Sox to the New York Yankees to complete an earlier deal made on August 3, 1967. The Boston Red Sox traded Pete Magrini to the New York Yankees for Elston Howard. Klimkowski was traded to the New York Yankees by the Boston Red Sox to complete the trade. Klimkowski made his major league debut on September 15, 1969. On that day, the Detroit Tigers were playing against the New York Yankees at Yankee Stadium with 5,734 people attending the game. Klimkowski was called to replace Tom Shopay pitching and batting 9th at the top of the seventh inning. He pitched three full innings. At the bottom of the ninth inning, Dave McDonald was called to pinch hit for Klimkowski batting 9th. At the end of the game, the New York Yankees lost the game 2–1. He was traded with Rob Gardner from the Yankees to the Athletics for Felipe Alou on April 9, 1971. On May 22, 1972, he was released by the Oakland Athletics and on the same day was signed again with the New York Yankees. Klimkowski played his last Major League Baseball game on September 22, 1972.

== Death ==
He died of heart failure at Plainview Hospital in Plainview, New York, on November 13, 2009, at the age of 65.
