= Bert Bradley =

American baseball player (born 1956)

- Pitcher
- Born: December 23, 1956 (age 69); Athens, Georgia, U.S.
- Batted: Both Threw: Right

MLB debut
- September 23, 1983, for the Oakland Athletics

Last MLB appearance
- October 2, 1983, for the Oakland Athletics

MLB statistics
- Games pitched: 6
- Earned run average: 6.48
- Strikeouts: 3
- Stats at Baseball Reference

Teams
- Oakland Athletics (1983)

Steven Bert Bradley (born December 23, 1956) is an American former Major League Baseball pitcher and coach. He pitched in six games for the Oakland Athletics during the 1983 season and began his coaching career in 1987.

Bradley graduated from Cumberland High School in Toledo, Illinois. He played college baseball at Lake Land College and Brigham Young University, helping the Cougars win the Western Athletic Conference championship in 1979.

The Athletics drafted Bradley in the 27th round of the 1979 MLB draft. Bradley began his professional career as a starter, switching to a relief role in 1982. He led the Triple-A Tacoma Tigers in saves and games pitched in 1983 before being a September call-up to the majors, where he pitched six times in his only MLB experience. Bradley returned to Tacoma in 1984, working as a starter and reliever.

Along with Rickey Henderson, Bradley was traded to the New York Yankees on December 5, 1984 for five players. Bradley pitched in the Yankees minor league system for two seasons before he returned to the Athletics organization in 1987, finishing his career with the Madison Muskies.

After his playing career ended, Bradley became a pitching coach in the Athletics minor leagues, including with the Muskies from 1987–1990, the Huntsville Stars (1991–1992, 1997–1998), the Tacoma Tigers (1993–1994), and the West Michigan Whitecaps (1995–1996). He then moved to the San Francisco Giants organization, coaching the Bakersfield Blaze (1999–1999), San Jose Giants (2000), Shreveport Swamp Dragons (2001), and Fresno Grizzlies (2002–2003), before becoming a minor league pitching coordinator from 2004 to 2017. He became a pitching crosschecker in 2018 then a special assignment scout in 2021. Bradley is the pitching coach at Lake Land College, where he first played college baseball.

Bradley's son Ryan was selected by the Giants in the 30th round of the 2010 MLB draft and reached Triple-A in 2014.
