= Bob Kearney =

American baseball player (born 1956)

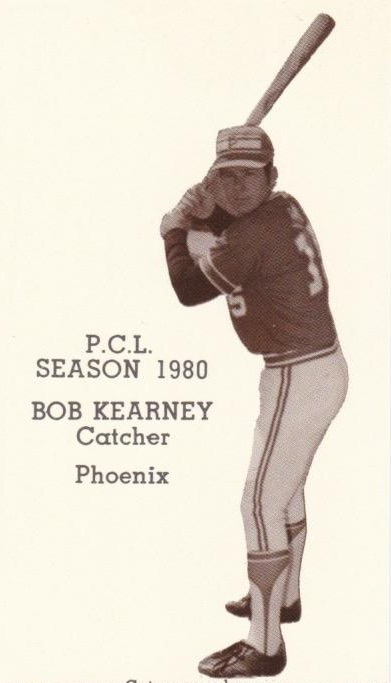
- Catcher
- Born: October 3, 1956 (age 69); San Antonio, Texas, U.S.
- Batted: Right Threw: Right

MLB debut
- September 25, 1979, for the San Francisco Giants

Last MLB appearance
- June 20, 1987, for the Seattle Mariners

MLB statistics
- Batting average: .233
- Home runs: 27
- Runs batted in: 133
- Stats at Baseball Reference

Teams
- San Francisco Giants (1979); Oakland Athletics (1981–1983); Seattle Mariners (1984–1987)

Robert Henry Kearney (born October 3, 1956), is an American former professional baseball player. He played in Major League Baseball as a catcher for the San Francisco Giants, Oakland Athletics, and Seattle Mariners from 1979 to 1987.

== Major League career ==
Kearney was drafted by the San Francisco Giants in the fourteenth round of the 1977 Major League Baseball draft out of the University of Texas. He made his major league debut with the Giants late in the 1979 season, but returned to the minor leagues for the following season. Kearney was drafted by the Oakland Athletics from the Giants in the 1980 minor league draft. Kearney's strong throwing arm was made evident in a game against the Tacoma Indians in 1981 when, he threw out five baserunners attempting to steal second base. He was selected as the catcher for the 1981 Pacific Coast League Northern Division All-Star team.

Kearney began the 1982 season with the Athletics when regular catchers Mike Heath and Jeff Newman were sidelined by injuries but, would later be sent back to the minor leagues. In September, he was recalled to the major leagues after hitting for a .253 batting average in Tacoma. He shared catching duties with Heath in 1983, posting a .255 batting average with 8 home runs and 32 runs batted in. Kearney was named as the catcher for the 1983 Topps All-Star Rookie Team and was also named the Baseball Digest All-Star Rookie Catcher Of The Year.

Kearney was traded to the Seattle Mariners before the 1984 season, replacing Rick Sweet as their starting catcher. Despite his strong throwing arm, he developed a reputation for poor pitch-calling skills. During the 1984 season, Mariners pitchers Salomé Barojas and Mike Moore both demanded to have Orlando Mercado as their catcher. This lack of pitch-calling skills along with his light-hitting caused the Mariners to trade for veteran catcher Steve Yeager before the 1986 season. Yeager was expected to catch the majority of the Mariners' games however, he had a disappointing season and Kearney would eventually lead the team's catchers by appearing in 81 games. In 1987, he was displaced by Scott Bradley as the Mariners' starting catcher and was released in July of that year after posting a .170 batting average in 51 games.

== Career statistics ==
In an eight-year career, Kearney played in 479 games, accumulating 316 hits in 1356 at bats for a .233 career batting average along with 27 home runs and 133 runs batted in. He ended his career with a .987 fielding percentage. Kearney led American League catchers in 1984 with 823 putouts, and in 1985, he led the league in fielding percentage with a .995 average, committing only three errors in 108 games.
