= Ben Callahan =

American baseball player (1957-2007)

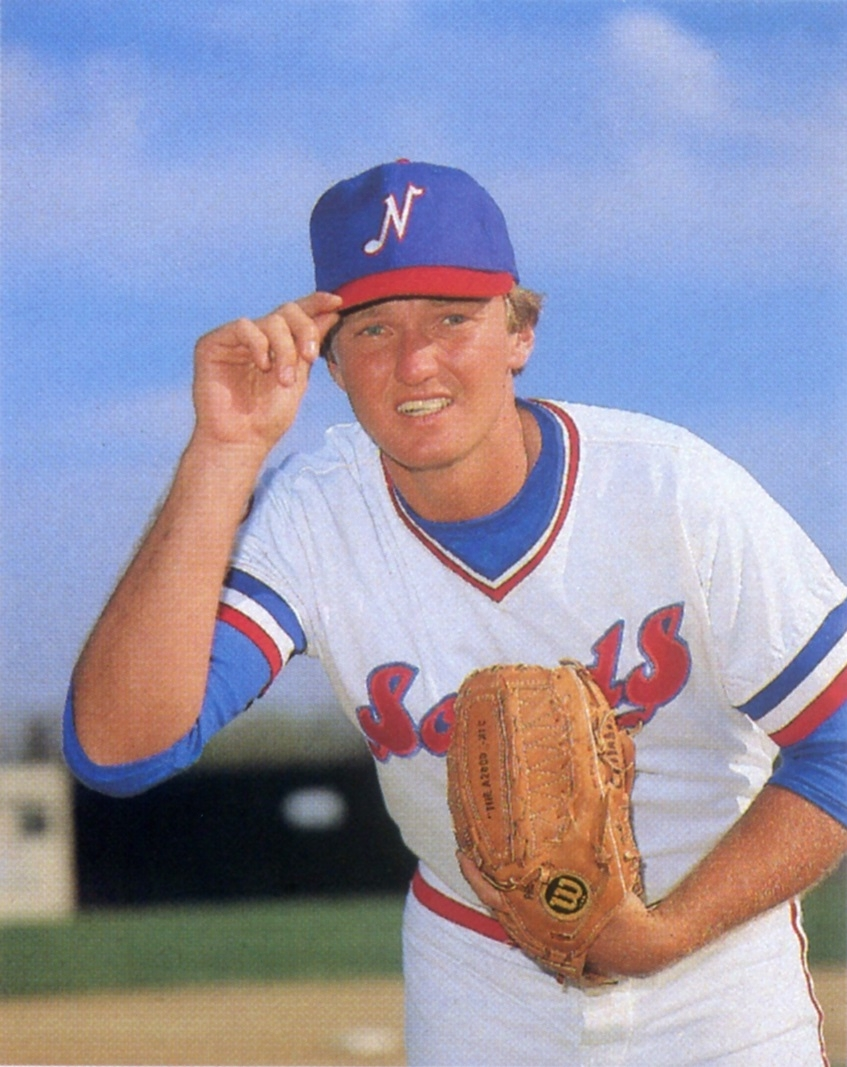
- Callahan with the Nashville Sounds in 1982
- Pitcher
- Born: May 19, 1957; Mount Airy, North Carolina, U.S.
- Died: January 9, 2007 (aged 49); Concord, North Carolina, U.S.
- Batted: Right Threw: Right

MLB debut
- June 22, 1983, for the Oakland Athletics

Last MLB appearance
- July 3, 1983, for the Oakland Athletics

MLB statistics
- Earned run average: 12.54
- Games: 4
- Strikeouts: 2
- Stats at Baseball Reference

Teams
- Oakland Athletics (1983)

Benjamin Franklin Callahan (May 19, 1957 – January 9, 2007) was an American professional baseball pitcher who played in Major League Baseball. The right-hander was drafted by the New York Yankees in the 31st round of the 1980 amateur draft, then traded to the Oakland Athletics on June 15, 1983. One week later he made his major league debut with the A's.

Out of the four games he pitched for Oakland (two starts), Callahan's second outing was his best. On June 27, 1983, he pitched six innings and gave up just one earned run in a 7–1 victory over the Kansas City Royals. This took place in front of 21,841 fans at the Oakland–Alameda County Coliseum. The losing pitcher was Larry Gura.

In his other three games, he gave up 12 earned runs in just 3.1 innings and the 26-year-old was sent back to the minor leagues, never to return to the major league level. His final totals include a 1–2 record in 9.1 innings pitched, two strikeouts (Amos Otis and Billy Sample), and an earned run average of 12.54.
