= Luis Quiñones (baseball) =

Puerto Rican baseball player (born 1962)

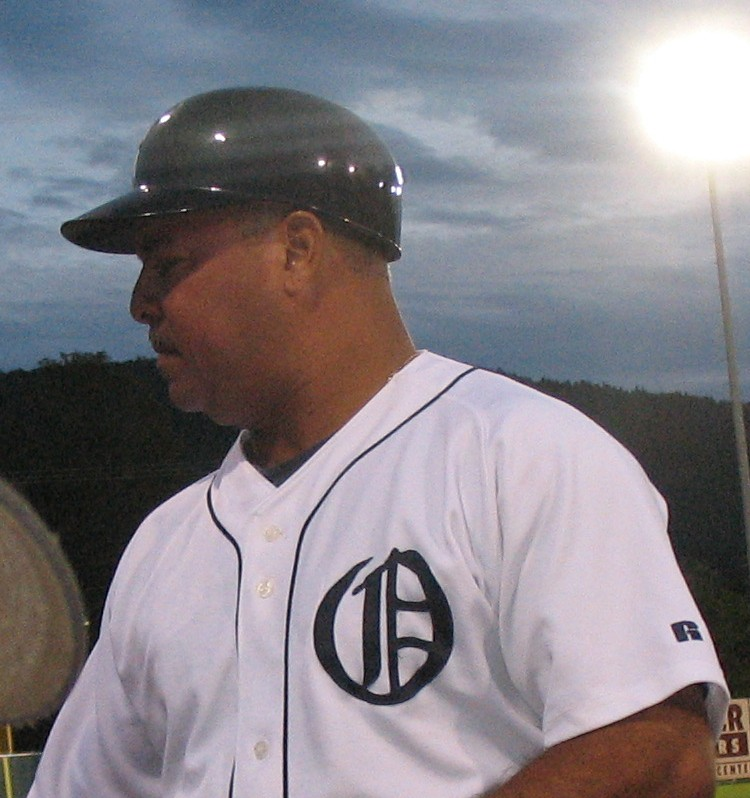
- Infielder
- Born: April 28, 1962 (age 63); Ponce, Puerto Rico
- Batted: Switch Threw: Right

MLB debut
- May 27, 1983, for the Oakland Athletics

Last MLB appearance
- April 11, 1992, for the Minnesota Twins

MLB statistics
- Batting average: .226
- Home runs: 19
- Runs batted in: 106
- Stats at Baseball Reference

Teams
- Oakland Athletics (1983); San Francisco Giants (1986); Chicago Cubs (1987); Cincinnati Reds (1988–1991); Minnesota Twins (1992)

Career highlights and awards
- World Series champion (1990)

Luis Raúl Quiñones Torruellas (born April 28, 1962) is an American former utility infielder in Major League Baseball and current hitting coach for the Batavia Muckdogs, Short-Season Single-A affiliate of the Miami Marlins. From 1983 through 1992, Quiñones played for the Oakland Athletics (1983), San Francisco Giants (1986), Chicago Cubs (1987), Cincinnati Reds (1988–91) and Minnesota Twins (1992). He was a switch-hitter and threw right-handed. He received National League Player of the Week honors for the week beginning September 3, 1989.

Luis was a member of the Cincinnati Reds 1990 World Series Championship team. He drove in what would be the winning run in Game 6 of the 1990 NLCS, a 2–1 Reds victory and the National League pennant.

After spending the 2009 season as the hitting coach for the Oneonta Tigers, he was promoted by the Detroit Tigers to the same position with the West Michigan Whitecaps of the Midwest League.

In an eight-season career, Quiñones posted a .226 batting average with 19 home runs and 106 RBI in 442 games played.
