= Austin Peterson =

Austin Peterson may refer to:

- Austin Peterson (cartoonist) (1906–2015), American screenwriter, cartoonist, and radio program director
- Austin Peterson (baseball) (born 1999), American baseball pitcher
- Austin Peterson (politician), American politician

== See also ==
- Austin Petersen (born 1981), American nonfiction writer, politician and activist
