= Mark Smith (pitcher) =

American baseball player (born 1955)

- Pitcher
- Born: November 23, 1955 (age 69); Arlington, Virginia
- Batted: Right Threw: Right

MLB debut
- August 12, 1983, for the Oakland Athletics

Last MLB appearance
- October 2, 1983, for the Oakland Athletics

MLB statistics
- Record: 1-0
- Earned run average: 6.75
- Strikeouts: 10
- Stats at Baseball Reference

Teams
- Oakland Athletics (1983)

Mark Christopher Smith (born November 23, 1955) is a retired Major League Baseball pitcher. He played during one season at the major league level for the Oakland Athletics. He was drafted by the Baltimore Orioles in the 9th round of the 1977 amateur draft. He played his first professional season with their Class A-Advanced Miami Orioles in 1978, and his last with the Oakland Athletics in 1983.

He is the head coach of the Canadian women's national softball team. He coached them at the 2020 Summer Olympics and won a bronze medal.

== Sources ==
- "Mark Smith Statistics - MLB". The Baseball Cube. 7 January 2008.
- "Mark Smith Statistics - AAA". The Baseball Cube. 7 January 2008.
