= Gorman Heimueller =

American baseball player (born 1955)

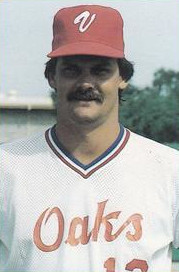
- Heimueller in 1988
- Pitcher
- Born: September 24, 1955 (age 70); Los Angeles, California, U.S.
- Batted: Left Threw: Left

MLB debut
- July 12, 1983, for the Oakland Athletics

Last MLB appearance
- July 4, 1984, for the Oakland Athletics

MLB statistics
- Win–loss record: 3–6
- Earned run average: 4.67
- Strikeouts: 34
- Stats at Baseball Reference

Teams
- Oakland Athletics (1983–1984)

Gorman John Heimueller (born September 24, 1955) is an American former professional baseball pitcher. Heimueller pitched parts of two seasons in Major League Baseball (MLB) for the Oakland Athletics in 1983 and 1984.

== Sources ==
- Career statistics from Baseball Reference · Baseball Reference (Minors) · Retrosheet · Baseball Almanac, or Retrosheet
