= Mike Edwards (second baseman) =

American baseball player (1952–2026)

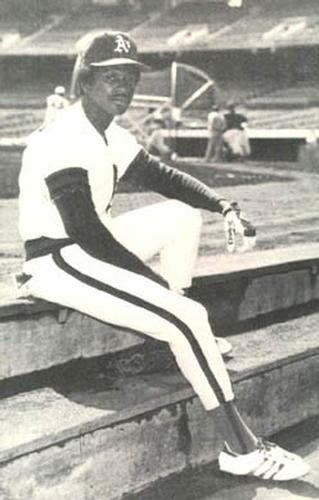
- Second baseman
- Born: August 27, 1952; Fort Lewis, Washington, U.S.
- Died: September 22, 2026 (aged 74)
- Batted: Right Threw: Right

Professional debut
- MLB: September 10, 1977, for the Pittsburgh Pirates
- NPB: April 9, 1983, for the Kintetsu Buffaloes

Last appearance
- MLB: September 28, 1980, for the Oakland Athletics
- NPB: October 10, 1983, for the Kintetsu Buffaloes

MLB statistics
- Batting average: .250
- Home runs: 2
- Runs batted in: 49

NPB statistics
- Batting average: .291
- Home runs: 1
- Runs batted in: 10
- Stats at Baseball Reference

Teams
- Pittsburgh Pirates (1977); Oakland Athletics (1978–1980); Kintetsu Buffaloes (1983)

Michael Lewis Edwards (August 27, 1952 – September 22, 2026) was an American professional baseball second baseman. He played four seasons in Major League Baseball (MLB) for the Pittsburgh Pirates and Oakland Athletics. He also played one season in Nippon Professional Baseball (NPB) for the Kintetsu Buffaloes in 1983.

== High school and college ==
Edwards had two brothers who also played in the major leagues, Dave Edwards and Marshall Edwards, who was Mike's twin. As a senior at Jefferson High School in Los Angeles, Edwards batted .500 and was named to the All-Southern League and All-Los Angeles first teams. He and his brother Marshall played collegiate baseball together at LA City College and UCLA. At UCLA, as a junior he batted .326 and as a senior he batted .333 with 15 doubles, three triples, 14 home runs, 42 RBI and 12 stolen bases in 60 games. His 138 total bases were a then-UCLA record and his 14 homers were one short of the school's record of 15 held Chris Chambliss. Edwards was the second baseman on the All-Pacific 8 first team and an honorable mention All-American.

== Professional ==
Edwards was drafted in the 1970 MLB Amateur Draft, but chose to go to college. He was subsequently drafted in the 1971 MLB January Draft-Secondary Phase and the 1972 MLB January Draft-Regular Phase, opting to return to school each time. The Pittsburgh Pirates selected Edwards in the 7th round of the 1974 MLB Amateur Draft and Edwards began his minor league career that year with the Class A Short Season Niagara Falls Pirates.

Edwards made his MLB debut with the Pirates on September 10, 1977, as a pinch runner in a 4-2 loss to the Montreal Expos. Overall he saw action in seven games, going hitless in six at-bats.

Edwards was acquired by Oakland as the player to be named later in the trade that brought Manny Sanguillen back to Pittsburgh in April 1978, and he moved into the starting second base roll for the team. Edwards batted .274 for the season and stole 27 bases. From July 1 to July 16, Edwards went on a 17-game hitting streak. On August 10, 1978, he became the first American League second baseman to turn two unassisted double plays in the same game, a feat only accomplished once more since then (by Luis Alicea in 1997) and by no National League second baseman in the Modern Era.

Edwards played two more seasons in Oakland then finished up his professional career playing in Mexico and Japan. In his final season, 1984 with the Sultanes de Monterrey, he batted .442 in 113 games and teamed with his younger brother, Dave.

== Personal ==
Edwards died on September 22, 2026, at the age of 74.
