= Jim Fuller (outfielder) =

American baseball player (born 1950)

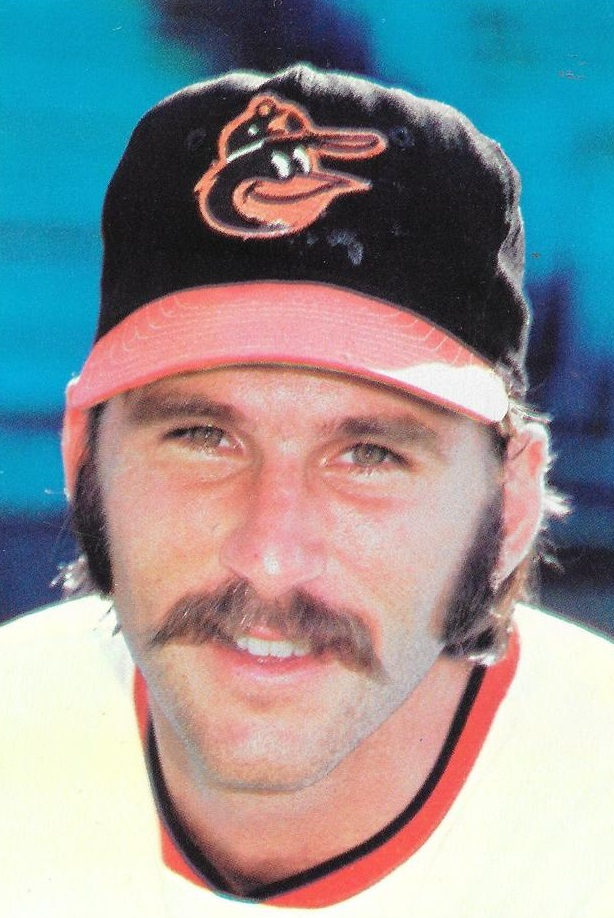
- Outfielder
- Born: November 28, 1950 (age 75); Bethesda, Maryland, U.S.
- Batted: Right Threw: Right

MLB debut
- September 10, 1973, for the Baltimore Orioles

Last MLB appearance
- September 25, 1977, for the Houston Astros

MLB statistics
- Batting average: .194
- Home runs: 11
- Runs batted in: 41
- Stats at Baseball Reference

Teams
- Baltimore Orioles (1973–1974); Houston Astros (1977)

James Hardy Fuller (November 28, 1950) is an American former professional baseball player. He played two seasons with the Baltimore Orioles and one season with the Houston Astros. He was drafted by the Baltimore Orioles in the 2nd round of the 1970 amateur draft. In three season he played 107 games and compiled a .194 career batting average with 11 home runs.
