= Mike Warren (baseball) =

American baseball player (born 1961)

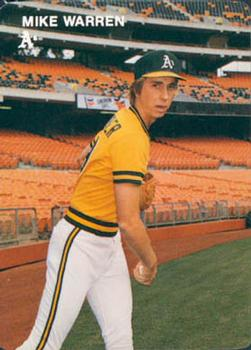
- Pitcher
- Born: March 26, 1961 (age 65); Inglewood, California, U.S.
- Batted: Right Threw: Right

MLB debut
- June 12, 1983, for the Oakland Athletics

Last MLB appearance
- July 2, 1985, for the Oakland Athletics

MLB statistics
- Win–loss record: 9–13
- Earned run average: 5.06
- Strikeouts: 139
- Stats at Baseball Reference

Teams
- Oakland Athletics (1983–1985)

Career highlights and awards
- Pitched a no-hitter on September 29, 1983

Michael Bruce Warren (born March 26, 1961) is an American former Major League Baseball pitcher for the Oakland Athletics. Though he made just 27 starts in his career, he pitched a no-hitter at Oakland–Alameda County Coliseum against the Chicago White Sox on September 29, 1983.

Warren was drafted by the Detroit Tigers in the twelfth round of the 1979 Major League Baseball draft out of Fullerton Union High School in Fullerton, California. After going 5-16 with a 5.60 earned run average over two seasons in which he never pitched at higher than the A-ball level, the Tigers released him. He was signed by Oakland shortly afterwards, but was selected by the Milwaukee Brewers 1981 rule 5 draft after just one season in their organization. He and fellow minor leaguer John Evans were traded back to the A's for infielder Rob Picciolo at the start of the 1982 minor league season.

Warren rewarded the A's with a breakout season for the Modesto A's in 1982, going 19-4 with a 3.00 ERA and 154 strikeouts to lead his team to the California League Championship. He made the jump from double A to the majors in 1983 thanks in part to a rash of injuries suffered by Oakland pitching. He was ineffective in two relief appearances, and was optioned to triple A Tacoma. He went 6-3 with a 3.53 ERA for the Tacoma Tigers to earn a call back to Oakland that August, this time as a starting pitcher. He was 1-3 with a 6.54 ERA when he won his final four starts of the season with a 1.85 ERA. The no-hitter came in his final start of the season, and was the thirteenth no-hitter in major league history by a rookie.

Warren suffered from a lack of run support as the A's managed to score just two runs in his first two starts of the 1984 season. When Oakland's bats finally heated up, Warren began suffering control issues. He was moved into the bullpen, and eventually optioned back to Tacoma in June with a 3-6 record and 5.09 ERA. He returned to the team briefly in July and again when rosters expanded that September.

His record stood at 1-4 with a 7.92 ERA in 1985 when he was relegated to "mop up duty" by manager Jackie Moore. He was shipped to Tacoma to make room on the major league roster when the A's signed Tommy John. He signed a minor league contract with the Kansas City Royals in 1986, but never returned to the majors.

== See also ==
- List of Major League Baseball no-hitters

| Preceded by Bob Forsch | No-hitter pitcher September 29, 1983 | Succeeded by Jack Morris |
