= Eddie Haas =

American baseball player and manager (1935–2026)

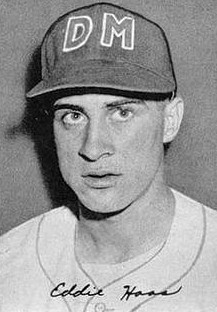
- Haas in 1955
- Outfielder
- Born: May 26, 1935; Paducah, Kentucky, U.S.
- Died: June 4, 2026 (aged 91); Louisville, Kentucky, U.S.
- Batted: Left Threw: Right

MLB debut
- September 8, 1957, for the Chicago Cubs

Last MLB appearance
- October 1, 1960, for the Milwaukee Braves

MLB statistics
- Batting average: .243
- Hits: 17
- Runs batted in: 10
- Stats at Baseball Reference

Teams
- As player: Chicago Cubs (1957); Milwaukee Braves (1958, 1960); As manager: Atlanta Braves (1985)

George Edwin Haas (May 26, 1935 – June 4, 2026) was an American baseball outfielder, coach, manager, and scout in Major League Baseball.

== Biography ==
Haas spent 14 years as a manager or coach in the farm system of the Milwaukee/Atlanta Braves and replaced Joe Torre as Atlanta's manager after the 1984 season. His 1985 Braves squad went 50–71 (.413). With the Braves in fifth place in the National League West Division and 22 games out of the lead, Haas was fired on August 26, 1985, and succeeded by interim pilot Bobby Wine.

In his playing days, the 5 ft 11 in (1.80 m), 178 lb (81 kg) Haas was an outfielder who batted left-handed and threw right-handed. He graduated from St. John High School in Paducah, Kentucky and signed his first professional contract with the Chicago Cubs. He made the Majors with the Cubs in 1957 and was traded to the Milwaukee Braves in the offseason. His MLB career consisted of 55 games (1957–1958; 1960) with those two clubs, batting .243 with one home run and 17 total hits. A broken ankle cost him the entire 1959 season.

He remained on the Braves payroll after his minor league playing career ended and long after they moved to Atlanta. He served as a minor league manager and coach (1965–1973; 1978–1984), and as a coach for the MLB Braves (1974–1977). After his brief MLB managerial career, he served as a special assignment scout for the Montreal Expos (1986–1994) and Boston Red Sox (1995–2003).

Haas came from a baseball family: his brother, Louis, was an infielder in the Braves' organization from 1959 to 1962; two sons, Matt and Danny, are longtime scouts and former minor league players; cousins Phil and Gene Roof are former Major League players and coaches and who spent many years as minor league managers; and another cousin, Paul Roof, pitched in the minor leagues.

Haas died on June 4, 2026, at the age of 91.
