= Bob Kammeyer =

American baseball player (1950-2003)

- Pitcher
- Born: December 2, 1950; Kansas City, Kansas, U.S.
- Died: January 27, 2003 (aged 52); Sacramento, California, U.S.
- Batted: Right Threw: Right

MLB debut
- July 3, 1978, for the New York Yankees

Last MLB appearance
- September 18, 1979, for the New York Yankees

MLB statistics
- Win–loss record: 0–0
- Earned run average: 9.14
- Strikeouts: 11
- Stats at Baseball Reference

Teams
- New York Yankees (1978–1979)

Robert Lynn Kammeyer (December 2, 1950 – January 27, 2003) was an American professional baseball pitcher. He played parts of two seasons, 1978 and 1979, in Major League Baseball for the New York Yankees.

Kammeyer pitched in seven games for the Yankees in 1978, posting an earned run average of 5.82 with 11 strikeouts in 21.2 innings pitched. In 1979, he appeared in just one major league game, in which he gave up eight earned runs without recording an out, a single-season record.

In 1980, Kammeyer was named the Pitcher of the Year for the International League while pitching for the Columbus Clippers. Despite this, he chose to retire at the end of the season.

Kammeyer died of a pulmonary embolism in Sacramento, California on January 27, 2003.
