= Mickey Klutts =

American baseball player (born 1954)

- Third baseman
- Born: September 20, 1954 (age 70); Montebello, California, U.S.
- Batted: Right Threw: Right

MLB debut
- July 7, 1976, for the New York Yankees

Last MLB appearance
- July 26, 1983, for the Toronto Blue Jays

MLB statistics
- Batting average: .241
- Home runs: 14
- Runs batted in: 59
- Stats at Baseball Reference

Teams
- New York Yankees (1976–1978); Oakland Athletics (1979–1982); Toronto Blue Jays (1983)

Gene Ellis "Mickey" Klutts (born September 20, 1954) is an American former professional baseball third baseman who played in Major League Baseball (MLB) from 1976 to 1983 with the New York Yankees, Oakland Athletics, and Toronto Blue Jays. An infielder, Klutts was a favorite of manager Billy Martin, for whom he played in both New York and Oakland. He batted .319 with 24 home runs and 80 runs batted in (RBI) with the Syracuse Chiefs and shared International League Most Valuable Player (MVP) honors with Rich Dauer and Joe Lis in 1976.

Klutts attended El Rancho High School in Pico Rivera, California.
