= Rusty McNealy =

American baseball player

- Outfielder
- Born: August 12, 1958 (age 67); Sacramento, California, U.S.
- Batted: Left Threw: Left

MLB debut
- September 4, 1983, for the Oakland Athletics

Last MLB appearance
- October 2, 1983, for the Oakland Athletics

MLB statistics
- Games: 15
- Plate appearances: 4
- Hits: 0
- Stats at Baseball Reference

Teams
- Oakland Athletics (1983)

Robert Lee McNealy (born August 12, 1958) is an American former Major League Baseball (MLB) outfielder who made a brief appearance with the Oakland Athletics toward the end of the 1983 season.

While playing college baseball for Florida International University, McNealy was drafted by the New York Yankees in the fourth round of the January 1978 amateur draft, but did not sign. His stock fell by his senior year, as the Seattle Mariners waited until the seventeenth round of the 1980 Major League Baseball draft to call his name.

He batted .306 with three home runs, sixty runs batted in, 124 runs scored and 73 stolen bases in his two seasons in Seattle's farm system. On December 9, 1981, he and fellow minor leaguer Tim Hallgren were traded to Oakland for pitcher Roy Thomas.

In his first season with the A's, he batted .310 and scored eighty runs for the double A West Haven A's to be voted the sixth best prospect in the Eastern League in a 1982 poll of the league's managers. After one more season in the minors, he received a September call up to Oakland in 1983. A's manager Steve Boros used McNealy mostly as a pinch runner in the fifteen games in which he appeared. McNealy logged just four plate appearances without getting a hit, but still managed to score five runs. On September 27, 1983, he scored the game winning run of their 5-4 victory over the Chicago White Sox pinch running for Jeff Burroughs.

On December 7, 1983, he was traded to the Montreal Expos for veteran pitcher Ray Burris.
