= Pepe Mangual =

Puerto Rican baseball player (born 1952)

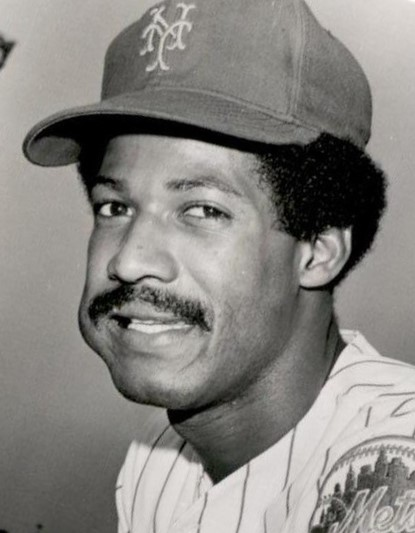
- Outfielder
- Born: May 23, 1952 (age 74); Ponce, Puerto Rico
- Batted: Right Threw: Right

MLB debut
- September 6, 1972, for the Montreal Expos

Last MLB appearance
- October 2, 1977, for the New York Mets

MLB statistics
- Batting average: .242
- Home runs: 16
- Runs batted in: 83
- Stats at Baseball Reference

Teams
- Montreal Expos (1972–1976); New York Mets (1976–1977)

José Manuel "Pepe" Mangual Guilbe (born May 23, 1952) is a Puerto Rican former professional baseball outfielder. He played in Major League Baseball (MLB) for the Montreal Expos (1972–1976) and New York Mets (1976–1977).

== Career ==
Mangual played one full season, in 1975 with the Expos. In that year he played in 140 games and hit .245 with a .340 on-base percentage. He also stole 33 bases, good for sixth place in the National League that year.

Midway through the 1976 season, on July 21, Mangual was traded by the Expos along with Jim Dwyer to the Mets for Wayne Garrett and Del Unser. Mangual was acquired to help the Mets in the play-off hunt, but only managed a .186 average the rest of the season. 8 At-bats into the next year Mangual was off the team. He toiled around in the minor leagues for another seven years until 1984 when he called it quits after spending the last seven years in the California Angels organization. Mangual's career minor league numbers were good, a .268 average with a .391 on-base percentage and 161 home runs and 303 stolen bases.

== Personal life ==
Pepe Mangual's brother is another former MLB player, Ángel Mangual. His cousin is Coco Laboy.
