= Greg Wells (baseball) =

American baseball player (born 1954)

Greg Wells Boomer
- First baseman
- Born: April 25, 1954 (age 72); McIntosh, Alabama, U.S.
- Batted: Right Threw: Right

Professional debut
- MLB: August 10, 1981, for the Toronto Blue Jays
- NPB: April 9, 1983, for the Hankyu Braves

Last appearance
- MLB: October 3, 1982, for the Minnesota Twins
- NPB: October 11, 1992, for the Fukuoka Daiei Hawks

MLB statistics
- Batting average: .228
- Home runs: 0
- Runs batted in: 8

NPB statistics
- Batting average: .317
- Home runs: 277
- Runs batted in: 901
- Stats at Baseball Reference

Teams
- Toronto Blue Jays (1981); Minnesota Twins (1982); Hankyu Braves / Orix Braves / Orix BlueWave (1983–1991); Fukuoka Daiei Hawks (1992)

Career highlights and awards
- Pacific League MVP (1984); Japanese Triple Crown (1984); 4x Best Nine Award (1984, 1986, 1987, 1989)

Gregory De Wayne "Boomer" Wells (born April 25, 1954) also known as "Boomer" is an American former professional baseball player. Wells played Major League Baseball for the Toronto Blue Jays in 1981 and for the Minnesota Twins in 1982. Wells also played Nippon Professional Baseball (NPB) for the Hankyu Braves/Orix Braves/Orix BlueWave and Fukuoka Daiei Hawks between 1983 and 1992.

He played 47 career Major League games in two seasons, batting .228, with 28 hits in 127 at-bats.

In more than ten NPB seasons he compiled a .317 batting average and a .555 slugging percentage, with 277 home runs and 901 RBI. In 1984, while playing for the Hankyu Braves, Wells won the NPB Triple Crown, with a batting average of .355, 37 home runs, and 130 runs batted in, also winning the Most Valuable Player award in the process. He was the first non-Japanese winner of the Triple Crown.
