= Marshall Brant =

American baseball player (born 1955)

- First baseman
- Born: September 17, 1955 (age 71); Garberville, California, U.S.
- Batted: Right Threw: Right

MLB debut
- October 1, 1980, for the New York Yankees

Last MLB appearance
- July 11, 1983, for the Oakland Athletics

MLB statistics
- Batting average: .100
- Home runs: 0
- Runs batted in: 2
- Stats at Baseball Reference

Teams
- New York Yankees (1980); Oakland Athletics (1983); Nippon Ham Fighters (1984–1985)

Marshall Lee Brant (born September 17, 1955) is an American former Major League Baseball player. Brant played for the New York Yankees in 1980 and the Oakland Athletics in 1983. In eight career games, he had two hits, two RBIs and a batting average of .100. Brant batted and threw right-handed.

Brant was selected by the New York Mets in the fourth round of the 1975 amateur draft. The Yankees designated him for assignment in October 1980. Brant was inducted into the Sonoma State University Athletics Hall of Fame in 1998. For his success in the minors, Brant became a 2015 inductee of the International League Hall of Fame.
