= Columbus Clippers =

Minor League Baseball team

- Founded in 1977; Columbus, Ohio
Team logo
Cap insignia

Minor league affiliations
- Class: Triple-A (1977–present)
- League: International League (1977–present)
- Division: West Division

Major league affiliations
- Team: Cleveland Indians / Guardians (2009–present)
- Previous teams: Washington Nationals (2007–2008); New York Yankees (1979–2006); Pittsburgh Pirates (1977–1978)

Minor league titles
- Class titles (2): 2010; 2011
- League titles (11): 1979; 1980; 1981; 1987; 1991; 1992; 1996; 2010; 2011; 2015; 2019
- Division titles (12): 1990; 1991; 1992; 1996; 1997; 1999; 2004; 2011; 2014; 2015; 2016; 2019
- Second-half titles (1): 2024
- Wild card berths (1): 2010

Team data
- Name: Columbus Clippers (1977–present)
- Colors: Navy, light blue, gray, white
- Mascots: Krash and Lou Seal
- Ballpark: Huntington Park (2009–present)
- Previous parks: Cooper Stadium (1977–2008)
- Owner/ Operator: Franklin County Government
- General manager: Tyler Parsons
- Manager: Andy Tracy
- Website: milb.com/columbus

The Columbus Clippers are a Minor League Baseball team of the International League (IL) and the Triple-A affiliate of the Cleveland Guardians. They are located in Columbus, Ohio, and are named for speedy merchant sailing vessels known as clippers. The team has played their home games at Huntington Park since 2009. They previously played at Cooper Stadium from 1977 to 2008.

The Clippers were established in 1977 as members of the Triple-A International League, and continue as such today. They won seven IL championships during a 28-year affiliation with the New York Yankees (1979–2006). Columbus has won four more IL titles and two Triple-A championships since affiliating with Cleveland in 2009.

== History ==
=== Before the Clippers ===
Professional baseball was first played in Columbus, Ohio, in 1877 by the Columbus Buckeyes of the International Association. It has been represented at the highest levels of Minor League Baseball nearly continuously since 1902, at first in the American Association by the Columbus Senators (1902–1930) and Columbus Red Birds (1931–1954) and then in the International League (IL) by the Columbus Jets (1955–1970). In 1971, the Jets moved to Charleston, West Virginia, as the Charleston Charlies, touching off a six-year drought of minor-league baseball in Columbus.

=== International League ===
==== Pittsburgh Pirates (1977–1978) ====
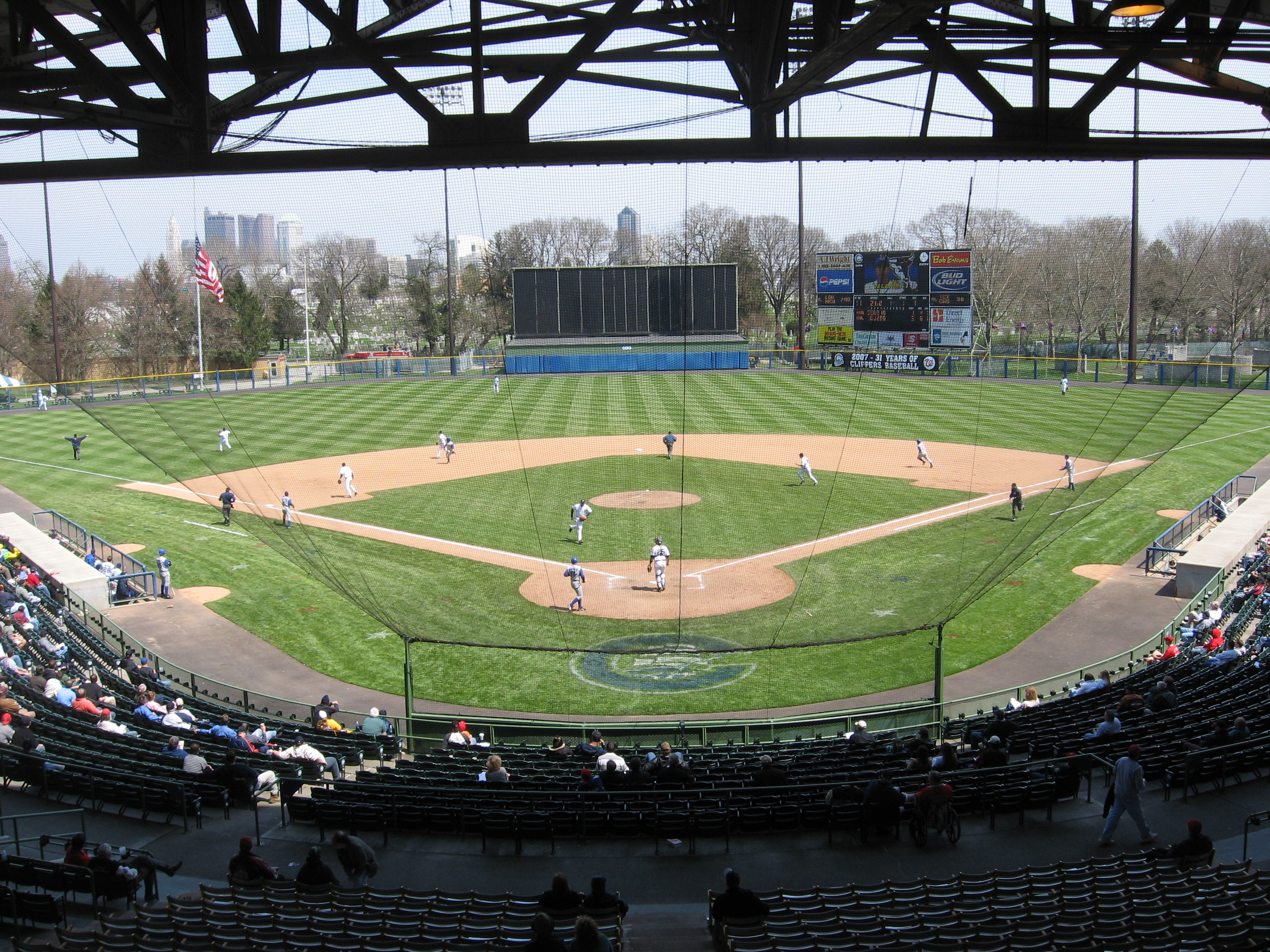
The Columbus Clippers played at Cooper Stadium from 1977 to 2008.

The Columbus Clippers began play in 1977 as the Triple-A affiliate of the Pittsburgh Pirates in the International League. They played their home games at Franklin County Stadium, which opened in 1932 as Red Bird Stadium and was renamed Cooper Stadium in 1985. The Clippers were named for speedy merchant sailing vessels known as clippers. Consecutive seventh-place finishes in their first two seasons kept the team out of the playoffs. Off the field, the franchise was recognized with the 1977 Larry MacPhail Award for outstanding minor league promotions.

==== New York Yankees (1979–2006) ====
Columbus changed its affiliation to the New York Yankees in 1979 in what would become a 28-year relationship and the most successful period in Clippers history. From 1979 to 1982, the Clippers finished atop the league standings and won three consecutive Governors' Cups, the International League championship. The 1979 team, managed by Gene Michael, won the league title by defeating the Syracuse Chiefs in the finals. Outfielder Bobby Brown was selected as the 1979 IL Most Valuable Player (MVP) and Rick Anderson as the Most Valuable Pitcher. Additionally, the franchise won its second Larry MacPhail Award. Joe Altobelli's 1980 Clippers won the next Governors' Cup over the Toledo Mud Hens. First baseman Marshall Brant won the league MVP Award, Bob Kammeyer won the top pitcher award, and Altobelli was chosen as the Manager of the Year. In 1981, Frank Verdi led Columbus to its third title over the Richmond Braves in a championship series that was shortened due to inclement weather.

Columbus qualified for the playoffs in each of the next three seasons but was eliminated in the semifinals each time. Several Clippers were recognized with league awards during this period. Third baseman Tucker Ashford won the 1982 IL MVP Award. In 1984, catcher Scott Bradley was the MVP and Rookie of the Year, and the Clippers won a third Larry MacPhail Award. Outfielder Dan Pasqua was a dual MVP and Rookie of the Year in 1985. The 1985 club reached the finals, but they lost the Governors' Cup to the Tidewater Tides. Though missing the postseason in 1986, first baseman Orestes Destrade won the Rookie of the Year Award. The 1987 Clippers, managed by Bucky Dent, swept the Rochester Red Wings in the semifinals and Tidewater in the finals to win their fourth IL championship. Brad Arnsberg won the 1987 Most Valuable Pitcher Award. Columbus next returned to the playoffs in 1990 via a Western Division title, but they lost the single round of playoffs and the championship to Rochester. Outfielder Hensley Meulens was the MVP of the 1990 season, and Dave Eiland was the top pitcher.

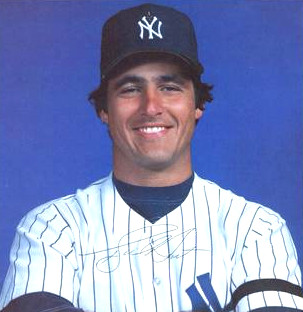
Bucky Dent led the 1987 Clippers to win the fourth IL championship in team history.

Manager Rick Down led the Clippers to back-to-back Governors' Cup championships in 1991 and 1992. The 1991 team defeated the Pawtucket Red Sox in the finals. They then advanced to the Triple-A Classic, a postseason championship series against the Denver Zephyrs, champions of the American Association, where they were defeated, 4–1. The 1992 squad won their championship over the Scranton/Wilkes-Barre Red Barons. First baseman J. T. Snow was selected as the MVP and Rookie of the Year, while Sam Militello was chosen as the Most Valuable Pitcher. In a 2001 ranking by baseball historians, the 1992 Clippers were recognized as the seventy-second greatest minor league team of all time.

The franchise was awarded the 1995 John H. Johnson President's Award, recognizing them as the "complete baseball franchise—based on franchise stability, contributions to league stability, contributions to baseball in the community, and promotion of the baseball industry." Columbus won its final IL championship as a Yankees affiliate in 1996 under Stump Merrill after winning the Western Division title, sweeping the Norfolk Tides in the semifinals, and sweeping Rochester in the championship round. They reached the finals in 1997 but lost in the final round to Rochester and were eliminated in the semifinals in 1999 and 2004. A pair of Clippers won awards in 1999: Ed Yarnall as the Most Valuable Pitcher and first baseman Kurt Bierek as Rookie of the Year. In 2003, first baseman Fernando Seguignol was selected as the league MVP.

==== Washington Nationals (2007–2008) ====
The Clippers became the Triple-A affiliate of the Washington Nationals in 2007. The partnership lasted two seasons, with Columbus finishing with losing records each season and failing to qualify for the Governors' Cup playoffs. On September 1, 2008, the Clippers played their final game at Cooper Stadium before moving into a new facility the following season. Over 16,000 people attended the game, a 3–0 loss to Toledo.

==== Cleveland Indians / Guardians (2009–present) ====
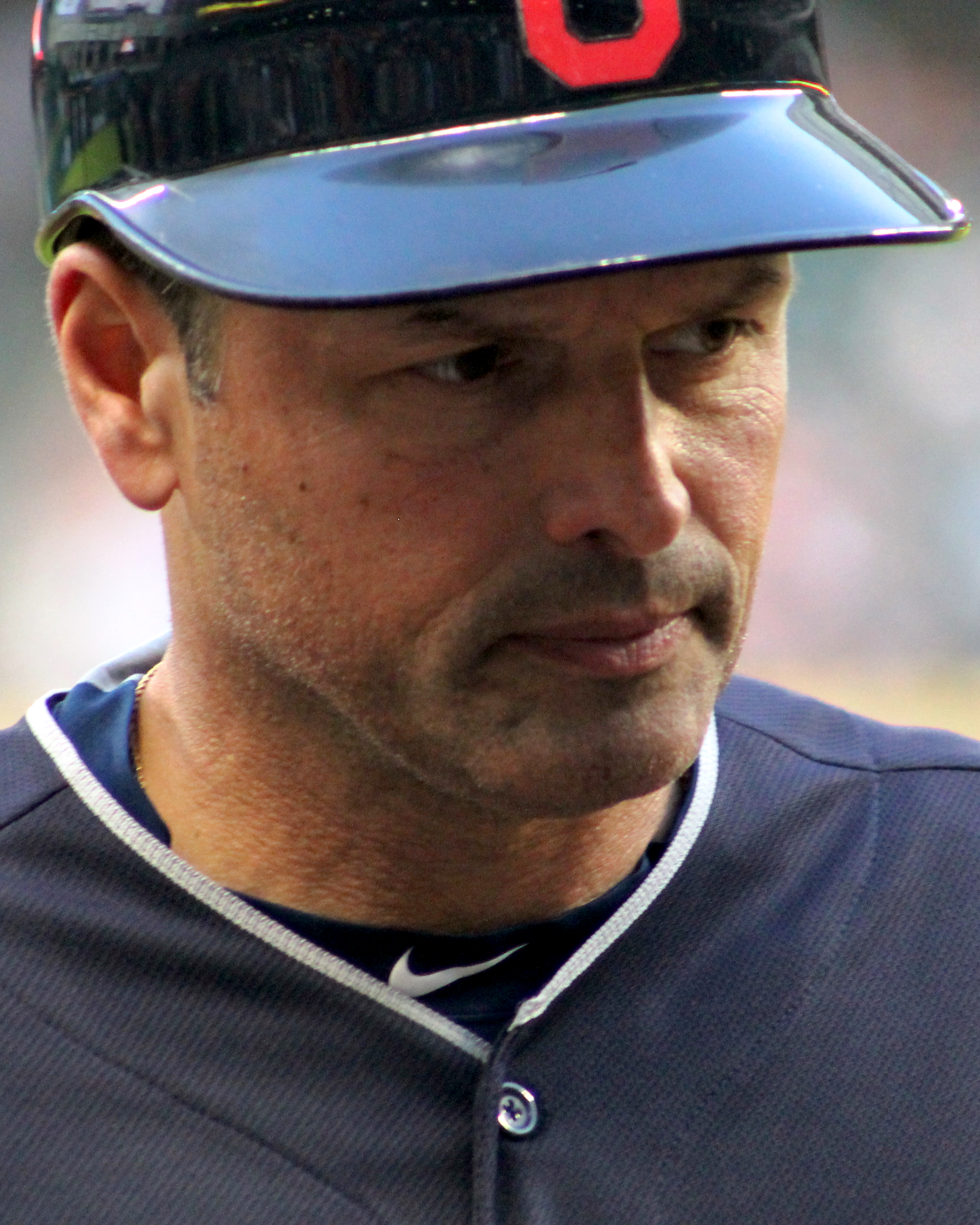
Mike Sarbaugh managed the Clippers to back-to-back IL and Triple-A championships in 2010 and 2011.

In 2009, Columbus began their affiliation with the Cleveland Indians. The Clippers also began playing at Huntington Park, a $56-million dollar, 10,000-seat stadium located at the corner of Neil Ave. and Nationwide Blvd. in the Columbus's Arena District. The inaugural home opener was played on April 18, 2009, when 11,950 people in attendance saw the Clippers lose to Toledo, 3–1.

Managed by Mike Sarbaugh, Columbus won consecutive IL championships in 2010 and 2011. After clinching a 2010 wild card berth, they defeated the Scranton/Wilkes-Barre Yankees in the semifinals then won the Governors' Cup against the Durham Bulls. The league title sent them to the Triple-A National Championship Game, a single game against the Tacoma Rainiers, champions of the Pacific Coast League (PCL), which was won by Columbus, 12–6. As the 2011 Western Division winners, Columbus advanced to the finals with a win over Scranton/Wilkes-Barre and won the Governors' Cup over Durham. In the Triple-A National Championship Game, they defeated the PCL's Omaha Storm Chasers, 8–3. Sarbaugh was recognized as the 2011 IL Manager of the Year.

The 2014 Clippers won the Western Division title but were ousted from the Governors' Cup playoffs by Durham in the semifinals. In 2015, Columbus was declared co-champion of the Western Division after finishing the season tied for first place with the Indianapolis Indians. They were seeded as the division champion for the playoffs by tie-breaking procedures. Defeating Norfolk in the semifinals, the Clippers met the Indians in the Governors' Cup finals and won the IL championship under manager Chris Tremie. They then lost the Triple-A Championship to the PCL's Fresno Grizzlies, 7–0. Columbus returned to the postseason in 2016 via a Western Division title, but they fell to the Gwinnett Braves in the semifinals. Outfielder Yandy Díaz was the 2016 IL Rookie of the Year. In 2019, under manager Tony Mansolino, the team captured its last International League championship. With another Western Division title and a semifinal win over the Gwinnett Stripers, they won the Governors' Cup against Durham. At the Triple-A National Championship Game they lost to the Sacramento River Cats, 4–0. The start of the 2020 season was initially postponed due to the COVID-19 pandemic before being cancelled altogether.

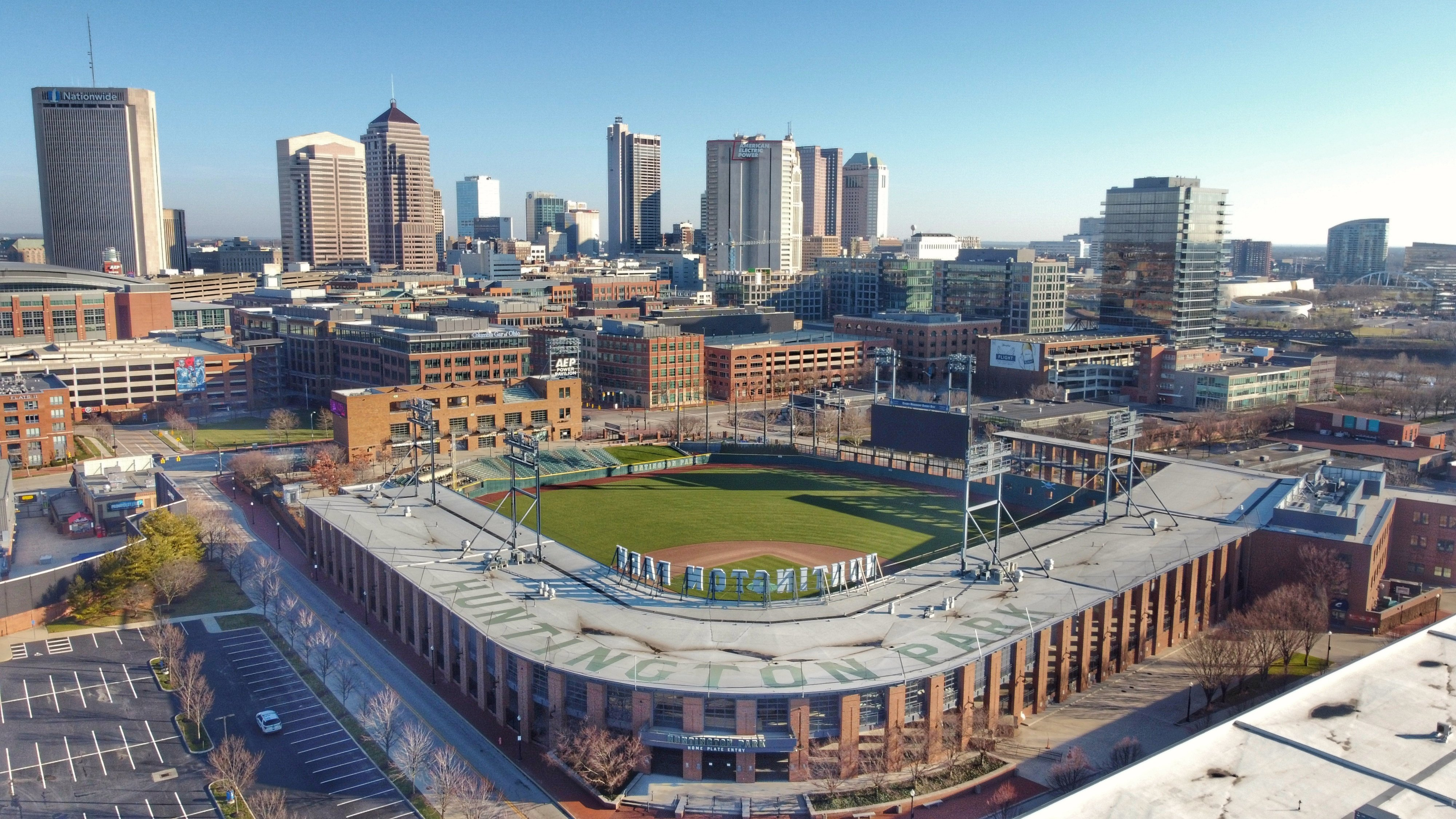
The Clippers have played at Huntington Park since 2009.

Following the 2020 season, Major League Baseball assumed control of Minor League Baseball in a move to increase player salaries, modernize facility standards, and reduce travel. The Clippers were organized into the Triple-A East and maintained their affiliation with the Cleveland Indians. Columbus ended the season in fifth place in the Midwestern Division with a 56–62 record. No playoffs were held to determine a league champion; instead, the team with the best regular-season record was declared the winner. However, 10 games that had been postponed from the start of the season were reinserted into the schedule as a postseason tournament called the Triple-A Final Stretch in which all 30 Triple-A clubs competed for the highest winning percentage. Columbus finished the tournament tied for 23rd place with a 3–6 record.

In 2022, the Triple-A East became known as the International League, the name historically used by the regional circuit prior to the 2021 reorganization, after Major League Baseball acquired the rights to the name. The Clippers won the second half of the 2024 season, giving them a playoff berth, but they lost the IL championship to the Omaha Storm Chasers, 2–1, in a best-of-three series. Their full season record was 80–68. Outfielder Johnathan Rodríguez won the IL MVP Award.

== Season-by-season records ==
Season-by-season records (last five seasons)
Season	League	Regular-season					Postseason			MLB affiliate	Ref.
Season	League	Record	Win %	League	Division	GB	Record	Win %	Result	MLB affiliate	Ref.
2022	IL	85–64	.570	4th	3rd	6	—	—	Result	—	Cleveland Guardians
2023	IL	68–79	.463	17th	10th	15 1/2	—	—	—	Cleveland Guardians	
2024	IL	80–68	.541	3rd	2nd	9	1–2	.333	Won second-half title Lost IL championship vs. Omaha Storm Chasers, 2–1	Cleveland Guardians	
2025	IL	64–81	.441	13th	7th	21	—	—	—	Cleveland Guardians	
2026	IL	78–69	.531	8th (tie)	4th	3 1/2	—	—	—	Cleveland Guardians	
Totals	—	375–361	.510	—	—	—	1–2	.333	—	—	—

== Roster ==
Columbus Clippers roster
Players	Coaches/Other
Pitchers: 50 Franco Aleman *; 26 Logan Allen *; 48 Shawn Armstrong *#; 41 Ryan Borucki; 45 Justin Campbell; 17 Trenton Denholm; 65 Yorman Gómez *; 47 Carlos Hernández; 44 Colin Holderman *#; 34 Jack Jasiak; 37 Jack Leftwich; 40 Ben Lively; 49 Rorik Maltrud; 12 Izaak Martinez; 16 Steven Pérez; 46 Austin Peterson *; 31 Hunter Stanley; 38 Trevor Stephan; -- Andrew Walters *; 44 Ryan Webb; Catchers: 6 Kody Huff; 2 Cooper Ingle *; 11 Dom Núñez; Infielders: 15 Dayan Frías; 24 Kyle Manzardo *; 4 Alex Mooney; 8 Milán Tolentino; 10 Tyresse Turner; 35 Ralphy Velazquez; Outfielders: 1 Blake Perkins *; 27 Alfonsin Rosario; 12 Daniel Schneemann *; 7 George Valera; 9 Kahlil Watson *	Manager: 28 Andy Tracy; Coaches: 9 Matt Angle (hitting); -- Andrew Moore (pitching); 23 Daniel Robertson (bench); 15 Mac Seibert (development); 4 Ordomar Valdez (hitting); -- Nick Wittgren (pitching); 60-day injured list: -- Aaron Davenport; 1 CJ Kayfus *; 7-day injured list; * On Cleveland Guardians 40-man roster; ~ Development list; # Rehab assignment; ∞ Reserve list; ‡ Restricted list; § Suspended list; † Temporarily inactive list; Roster updated September 18, 2026; Transactions; → More rosters: MiLB • International League; → Cleveland Guardians minor league players

== Awards ==
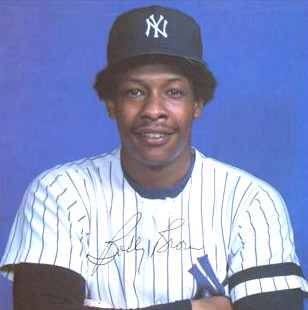
Bobby Brown won the International League Most Valuable Player Award in 1979.

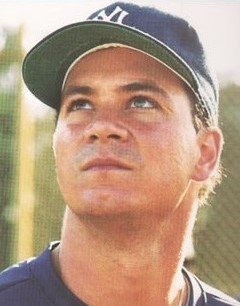
Dan Pasqua was the IL MVP and Rookie of the Year in 1985.

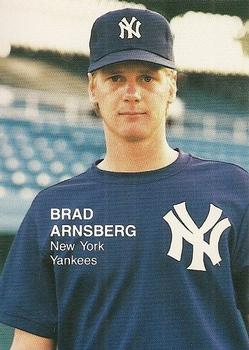
Brad Arnsberg won the IL Most Valuable Pitcher Award in 1987.

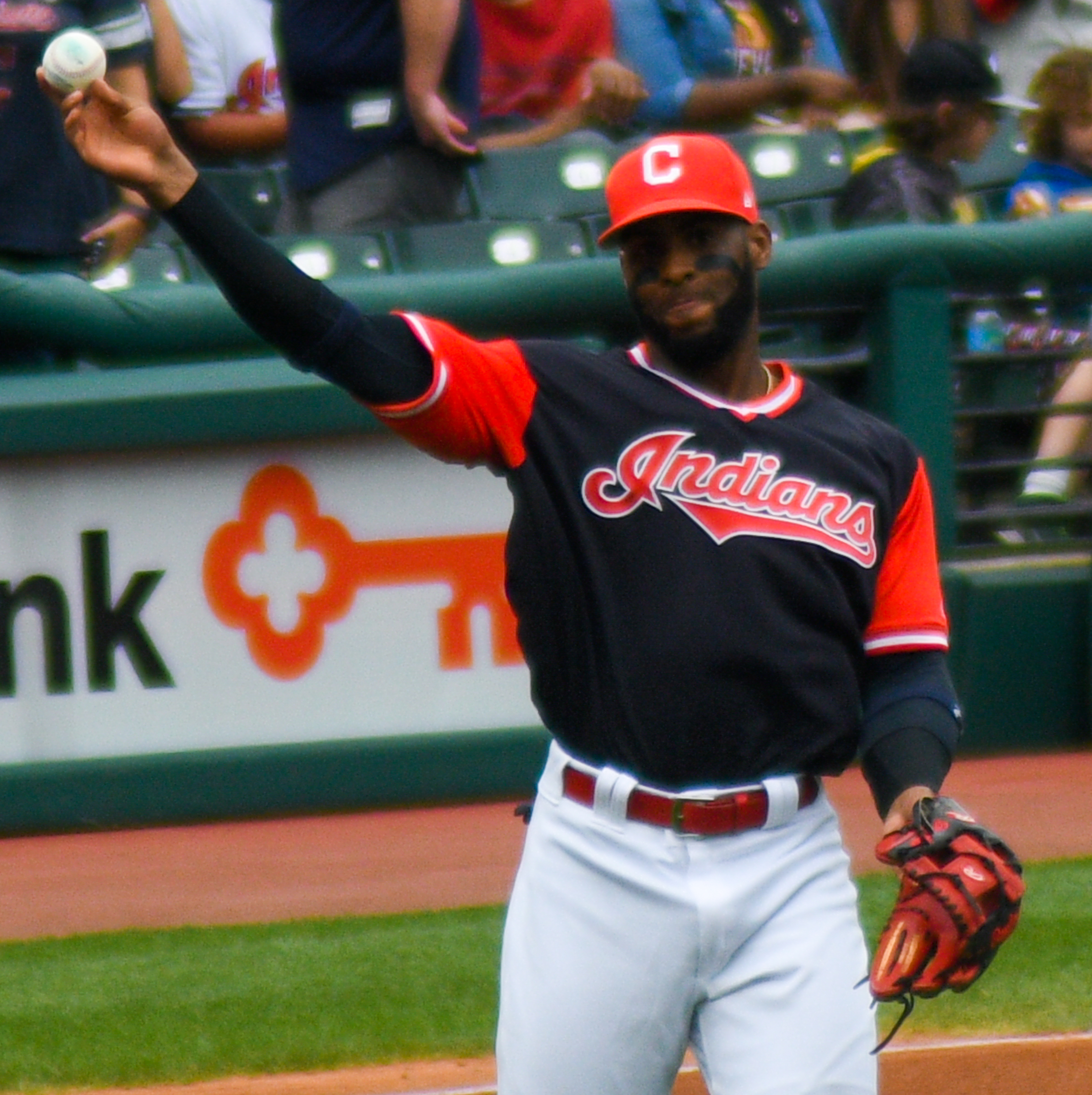
Yandy Díaz was the IL Rookie of the Year in 2016.

The franchise has been awarded these honors by Minor League Baseball.

Minor League Baseball Awards
Award	Season	Ref.
John H. Johnson President's Award	1995	
Larry MacPhail Award	1977	
Larry MacPhail Award	1979	
Larry MacPhail Award	1984	

Eighteen players, two managers, and two executives have won league awards in recognition for their performance with Columbus.

International League Awards
Award	Recipient	Season	Ref.
Most Valuable Player	Bobby Brown	1979	
Most Valuable Player	Marshall Brant	1980	
Most Valuable Player	Tucker Ashford	1982	
Most Valuable Player	Scott Bradley	1984	
Most Valuable Player	Dan Pasqua	1985	
Most Valuable Player	Hensley Meulens	1990	
Most Valuable Player	J. T. Snow	1992	
Most Valuable Player	Fernando Seguignol	2003	
Most Valuable Player	Johnathan Rodríguez	2024	
Most Valuable Pitcher	Rick Anderson	1979	
Most Valuable Pitcher	Bob Kammeyer	1980	
Most Valuable Pitcher	Brad Arnsberg	1987	
Most Valuable Pitcher	Dave Eiland	1990	
Most Valuable Pitcher	Sam Militello	1992	
Most Valuable Pitcher	Ed Yarnall	1999	
Rookie of the Year	Scott Bradley	1984	
Rookie of the Year	Dan Pasqua	1985	
Rookie of the Year	Orestes Destrade	1986	
Rookie of the Year	J. T. Snow	1992	
Rookie of the Year	Kurt Bierek	1999	
Rookie of the Year	Yandy Díaz	2016	
Manager of the Year	Joe Altobelli	1980	
Manager of the Year	Mike Sarbaugh	2011	
Executive of the Year	George H. Sisler Jr.	1977	
Executive of the Year	George H. Sisler Jr.	1979	
Executive of the Year	George H. Sisler Jr.	1980	
Executive of the Year	Ken Schnacke	1991	
Executive of the Year	Ken Schnacke	2011	
Executive of the Year	Ken Schnacke	2018	

== Radio and television ==
All Clippers home and road games are broadcast on WMNI AM 920. Live audio broadcasts are also available online through the station's website as well as on the team's website and the MiLB First Pitch app. Games can be viewed through the MiLB.TV subscription feature of the official website of Minor League Baseball.

As of 2021, Ryan Mitchell and Scott Leo serve as play-by-play announcers. Several former Clippers broadcasters have gone to work in Major League Baseball, including: John Gordon (1977–1981), Rick Rizzs (1981–1982), Pat Hughes (1982), Terry Smith (1983–2001), and Tom Hamilton (1987–1989).
