= Met Park =

Baseball stadium in Norfolk, Virginia

- Location within Virginia Location within the United States
- Interactive map of Met Park
- Full name: Metropolitan Memorial Park
- Address: Norfolk, Virginia
- Coordinates: 36.878°N 76.206°W
- Capacity: 6,100

Construction
- Built: 1969
- Opened: 1970
- Closed: 1992

Tenant
- Tidewater Tides (IL) 1970–1992

Metropolitan Memorial Park aka Met Park was a baseball stadium in Norfolk, Virginia. Built in 1969, it was the home to the Norfolk Tides (known at that time as the Tidewater Tides) until the construction of Harbor Park was completed for the Tides to play the 1993 season there.

Met Park sat 6,100, and was located near the end of the primary runway of the Norfolk International Airport. This often proved distracting to fans and players when aircraft flew overhead, but inadvertently proved strategic – as the AAA franchise of the New York Mets, players for the Tides could hope to someday be called to play in Shea Stadium, the location of which endured similar noise from nearby LaGuardia Airport.

After Met Park was demolished following the Tides' move to Harbor Park, the city built the Lake Wright Executive Center on the former Met Park land.
