= Watt Powell Park =

Demolished stadium in Charleston, WV, US

Coordinates: 38°19′40″N 81°36′00″W

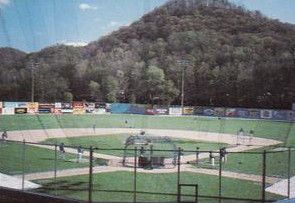
- Watt Powell Park in 1988

- Location within West Virginia Location within the United States
- Interactive map of Watt Powell Park
- Location: 3200 MacCorkle Avenue Charleston, West Virginia 25304
- Owner: City of Charleston
- Operator: City of Charleston
- Capacity: 4,474
- Field size: Left field: 340 ft Center field: 420 ft Right field: 330 ft

Construction
- Groundbreaking: 1948
- Built: 1948-1949
- Opened: April 28, 1949
- Closed: 2004
- Demolished: 2005
- Years active: 1949-2004
- Cost: $250,000 ($3.2 million in 2025 dollars)
- Builder: Kuhn Construction Company

Tenants
- Charleston Senators (1949-1960); Charleston Marlins (1961); Charleston Indians (1962-1964); Charleston Charlies (1971-1983); Charleston Wheelers/Alley Cats (1987-2004); WVSSAC Baseball State Tournament (1949-2004)

Watt Powell Park was a stadium, primarily used for baseball, in the Kanawha City neighborhood of Charleston, West Virginia. It opened in 1949, and was home to several Charleston minor-league franchises: the Charleston Senators of the Class A Central League (1949-1951) and the AAA American Association (1952-1960), the Charleston Marlins of the AAA International League (1961), the Charleston Indians of the AA Eastern League (1962-1964), the Charleston Charlies of the AAA International League (1971-1983) and Charleston Wheelers, later the Charleston Alley Cats of the Class A South Atlantic League (1987-2004). The state high school baseball tournament was held at Watt Powell Park in 1961, and annually from 1980-2024.

Watt Powell Park held 4,474 people, and was known for the scenic view of nearby hillsides. Watt Powell also was known for the CSX railroad line hard by the south wall of the stadium; some fans were known to watch games from there rather than pay to enter the stadium. A home run ball could reach the train tracks or even land in a moving train.

Watt Powell Park was bounded by MacCorkle Avenue on the front (north) side, 35th Street on the east, and South Park Road on the west. On the south side of the park, a ridge of hills formed a natural boundary.

The stadium earned a reputation as a pitchers' park due to the lack of power hitting over its lifespan. Part of this can be attributed to its dimensions; the field was 340 feet from home plate to the wall in left field, 330 feet in right, and a daunting 420 feet in deep center field. The outfield walls were also 12 feet high the whole distance around, higher than walls seen elsewhere in baseball. The center field wall included a 90-degree, inward facing angle, reminiscent of the old Griffith Stadium in Washington, DC.

Watt Powell Park closed in 2004 after the opening of Appalachian Power Park in Charleston's East End, near downtown. The Alley Cats moved to the new stadium and renamed themselves the West Virginia Power. The stadium was sold to the University of Charleston which then sold two thirds to the region's largest hospital, Charleston Area Medical Center, whose largest facility is a few blocks away. Demolition of the stadium began in late 2005 and in 2015 a new CAMC cancer clinic opened on the site.

Watt Powell Park Exterior

Watt Powell Park Grandstand
