= Charleston Charlies =

- 1971–1983; Charleston, West Virginia

Minor league affiliations
- Class: Triple-A (1971–1983)
- League: International League ((1971–1983))
- Division: South Division

Major league affiliations
- Team: Cleveland Indians (1981–1983); Texas Rangers (1980); Houston Astros (1977–1979); Pittsburgh Pirates (1971–1976)

Minor league titles
- League titles (1): 1977
- Division titles (2): 1973 • 1978
- Wild card berths (5): 1971 • 1972 • 1975 • 1977 • 1983

Team data
- Name: Charleston Charlies (1971–1983)
- Ballpark: Watt Powell Park
- Owner/ Operator: Bob Levine

The Charleston Charlies were a Triple-A minor league baseball team located in Charleston, West Virginia. Two separate Charlies franchises played in the International League from 1971 to 1983. The first team was the relocated Columbus Jets. In 1977 the franchise was returned to Columbus and Charlies owner Robert Levine purchased the Memphis Blues, moving the team to Charleston, assuming the Charlies name. The team was named for his father Charlie Levine who was also known as “Poor Charlie”. The Charlies were affiliated with the Pittsburgh Pirates (1971–76), Houston Astros (1977–79), Texas Rangers (1980), and Cleveland Indians (1981–83). The 1973 Charlies won the league's regular-season title. The original Charlies moved back to Columbus as the Columbus Clippers in 1977.

The new Charlies, which were the re-located Memphis Blues won the 1977 Governors' Cup, awarded to the IL's playoff championship, while the 1978 teams won the league's regular-season title. The franchise relocated in 1984 to Old Orchard Beach, Maine, playing as the Maine Guides. Today, the franchise is known as the Scranton/Wilkes-Barre RailRiders.

== History ==
The city of Charleston was without professional baseball from 1965 through 1970. The sport returned in 1971 when local businessman Bob Levine purchased the Columbus Jets of the Class AAA International League and relocated the franchise from Columbus, Ohio, to Charleston. Levine renamed the team the Charleston Charlies in honor of his father, Charlie Levine, an avid baseball fan.

The Charlies spent 13 seasons in the International League and served as the Triple-A affiliate of four Major League Baseball teams: the Pittsburgh Pirates (1971–1976), Houston Astros (1977–1979), Texas Rangers (1980), and Cleveland Indians (1981–1983). The franchise’s greatest success came in 1977, when the Charlies won the International League Championship as an affiliate of the Houston Astros. Charleston defeated the Tidewater Tides in the semifinals, 3–1, and then swept the Pawtucket Red Sox in the International League Finals, 4–0.

Many Charleston residents fondly remember the team’s logo—a smiling baseball character wearing a derby hat with a cigar in its mouth. After each game, the Charleston Gazette printed the logo on the front page: smiling after a win, frowning after a loss.

Bob Levine remained the owner throughout much of the Charlies’ time in Charleston. His father, Charlie Levine—who inspired the team’s name—was often seen watching games in a wheelchair, wearing a derby hat, and smoking a cigar. Known as “Poor Charlie” during his early years as a scrap-metal dealer in Beckley, West Virginia, Charlie Levine died in 1981 at the age of 89. Bob Levine died in 2011 at age 87.

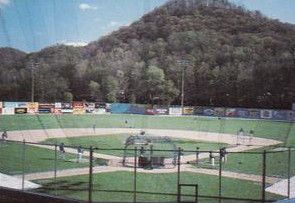
Watt Powell Park, home of the Charlies

In late 1976, the Pirates moved their Triple-A affiliate to Columbus, where the franchise became the Columbus Clippers. To keep baseball in Charleston, the Memphis Blues (International League) relocated to Charleston for the 1977 season and assumed the Charlies name and branding.

In August 1981, Levine announced he was putting the team up for sale and began seeking local buyers. The club was first sold to a group led by Carl Steinfeldt, and then later purchased by Jordan Kobritz in December 1982 and kept the team in Charleston for the 1983 season.

After that season, the franchise was relocated to Old Orchard Beach, Maine, and became the Maine Guides in 1984.

== Year-by-Year Record ==
Year	Regular season					Postseason			
Year	Manager	Won	Lost	Win %	Finish	Won	Lost	Win %	Result
1971	Joe Morgan	78	62	.557	3rd	0	3	.000	Lost semifinals vs Tidewater Tides, 0-3
1972	Red Davis	80	64	.556	2nd	1	2	.333	Lost semifinals vs Tidewater Tides, 1-2
1973	Joe Morgan †	85	60	.586	1st	5	3	.625	Won semifinals vs Tidewater Tides, 3-0; Lost IL Championship vs Pawtucket Red Sox, 2-3
1974	Steve Demeter	62	81	.434	6th	–	–	–	–
1975	Steve Demeter	72	67	.518	4th	0	3	.000	Lost Semifinals vs Tidewater Tides, 0-3
1976	Tim Murtaugh	62	73	.459	6th	–	–	–	–
1977	Jim Beauchamp	78	62	.557	2nd	7	1	.875	Won semifinals vs Tidewater Tides, 3-1'; Won Governors' Cup vs Pawtucket Red Sox, 4-0
1978	Jim Beauchamp ‡	85	55	.607	1st	1	3	.250	Lost Semifinals vs Richmond Braves, 1-3
1979	Jim Beauchamp	65	74	.468	6th	–	–	–	–
1980	Tom Burgess	67	71	.486	5th	–	–	–	–
1981	Cal Emery (22–31); Frank Lucchesi (45–41)	67	72	.482	5th	–	–	–	–
1982	Doc Edwards	59	81	.421	8th	–	–	–	–
1983	Doc Edwards	74	66	.529	3rd	0	3	.000	Lost Semifinals vs Richmond Braves, 0-3

†1973 International League Manager of the Year
‡1978 International League Manager of the Year

Legend
Postseason berth
League Championship

== Notable players and alumni ==
Many former Major League players spent time with the Charleston Charlies, particularly during the team’s affiliation with the Pittsburgh Pirates and Houston Astros. Notable alumni include:
• Dave Parker – 7× All-Star, 1978 National League MVP, and World Series champion with the Pirates.
• Richie Zisk – 2× All-Star outfielder and designated hitter.
• John Candelaria – 1977 All-Star and pitcher for the Pirates’ 1979 World Series team.
• Kent Tekulve – Renowned submarine-style reliever and key contributor to the Pirates’ 1979 championship.
• Gene Garber – Longtime MLB reliever with over 900 career appearances.
• Terry Puhl – Astros outfielder and 1978 All-Star.
• Rick Cerone – Yankees catcher and fan favorite during the early 1980s.
• Von Hayes – Outfielder/first baseman and 1989 All-Star with the Philadelphia Phillies.
• Tony Armas – 2× All-Star and 1984 American League home run champion.
• Tony La Russa – Hall of Fame manager who briefly played for Charleston during his playing career.
• Bob Coluccio – Former Milwaukee Brewers outfielder.
• Tim McCarver – 2× All-Star catcher, 2× World Series champion (1964, 1967), and longtime baseball broadcaster.
• Willie Randolph – 6× All-Star second baseman and later MLB manager, originally developed in the Pirates’ system.Baseball-Reference: Minor League Teams in Charleston, West Virginia

=== Former Charlies who became Major League managers ===
Six former Charleston Charlies players went on to manage in the Major Leagues:
• Tony La Russa – Managed the Chicago White Sox (1979–1986, 2021–2022), Oakland Athletics (1986–1995), and St. Louis Cardinals (1996–2011).
• Willie Randolph – Managed the New York Mets from 2005 to 2008.
• Bobby Valentine – Managed the Mets (1996–2002), Texas Rangers, and Boston Red Sox.
• Art Howe – Managed the Houston Astros, Mets (2003–2004), and Athletics (1996–2002).
• Luis Pujols – Interim manager of the Detroit Tigers (2002).
• Ken Macha – Managed the Athletics (2003–2006) and Milwaukee Brewers.

Notably, Valentine, Howe, and Randolph all managed the New York Mets, while La Russa, Howe, and Macha each managed the Oakland Athletics.

=== Managers ===
Former Major League player and longtime Atlanta Braves coach Jim Beauchamp managed the Charleston Charlies from 1977 to 1979 during the club’s affiliation with the Houston Astros.

== Earlier Charleston Minor League Clubs ==
Charleston's first Triple-A club, the Charleston Senators, moved to town on June 23, 1952, when the original Toledo Mud Hens franchise shifted there. The Senators played in the American Association through the 1960 season. They were farm clubs of the Chicago White Sox, Detroit Tigers and Washington Senators at various times during this period.

On May 19, 1961, after only five weeks of play, the St. Louis Cardinals abandoned their plans to place their Triple-A International League affiliate in San Juan, Puerto Rico, and moved the team, nicknamed the Marlins, to Charleston to finish out the season. This club – Charleston's second Triple-A franchise – stayed only those few months and relocated to Atlanta, for the 1962 season to become the Atlanta Crackers.

Charleston had a team, the West Virginia Power, in the Low A South Atlantic League until the 2020 reorganization of the Minor Leagues resulted in Charleston being left without an MLB affiliate. The franchise continues to operate as an Atlantic League team as the Charleston Dirty Birds. Historically, it has also been represented in the Eastern League and the mid-20th century Middle Atlantic League, among others.
