= 1984 Cleveland Indians season =

1984 Cleveland Indians
- League: American League
- Division: East
- Ballpark: Cleveland Municipal Stadium
- City: Cleveland, Ohio
- Record: 75–87 (.463)
- Divisional place: 6th
- Owners: Estate of F.J. "Steve" O'Neill
- General managers: Phil Seghi
- Managers: Pat Corrales
- Television: WUAB
- Radio: WWWE

The 1984 Cleveland Indians season was the 84th for the franchise.

== Offseason ==
- October 21, 1983: Brett Butler and Brook Jacoby were sent to the Indians by the Atlanta Braves to complete an earlier deal (the Indians traded Len Barker to the Braves for players to be named later and $150,000, and received Rick Behenna from the Braves on September 2) made on August 28, 1983.
- December 5, 1983: Kelly Gruber was drafted from the Indians by the Toronto Blue Jays in the 1983 rule 5 draft.
- January 14, 1984: DeWayne Buice was signed as a free agent by the Indians.
- February 5, 1984: Toby Harrah and a player to be named later were traded by the Indians to the New York Yankees for Otis Nixon, George Frazier and a player to be named later. The Indians and Yankees completed the deal on February 8, with the Indians sending Rick Browne (minors) to the Yankees and the Yankees sending Guy Elston (minors) to the Indians.

== Regular season ==
=== Season standings ===
AL East
Team	W	L	Pct.	GB	Home	Road
Detroit Tigers	104	58	.642	—	53‍–‍29	51‍–‍29
Toronto Blue Jays	89	73	.549	15	49‍–‍32	40‍–‍41
New York Yankees	87	75	.537	17	51‍–‍30	36‍–‍45
Boston Red Sox	86	76	.531	18	41‍–‍40	45‍–‍36
Baltimore Orioles	85	77	.525	19	44‍–‍37	41‍–‍40
Cleveland Indians	75	87	.463	29	41‍–‍39	34‍–‍48
Milwaukee Brewers	67	94	.416	36½	38‍–‍43	29‍–‍51

=== Record vs. opponents ===
1984 American League record Sources:
Team	BAL	BOS	CAL	CWS	CLE	DET	KC	MIL	MIN	NYY	OAK	SEA	TEX	TOR
Baltimore	—	6–7	8–4	7–5	7–6	7–6	5–7	7–6	5–7	5–8	6–6	9–3	9–3	4–9
Boston	7–6	—	9–3	7–5	10–3	7–6	3–9	9–4	6–6	7–6	7–5	4–8	5–7	5–8
California	4–8	3–9	—	8–5	8–4	4–8	6–7	8–4	4–9	8–4	7–6	9–4	5–8	7–5
Chicago	5–7	5–7	5–8	—	8–4	4–8	5–8	7–5	8–5	7–5	6–7	5–8	5–8	4–8
Cleveland	6–7	3–10	4–8	4–8	—	4–9	6–6	9–4	7–5	2–11	7–5	8–4	9–3	6–7–1
Detroit	6–7	6–7	8–4	8–4	9–4	—	7–5	11–2	9–3	7–6	9–3	6–6	10–2	8–5
Kansas City	7–5	9–3	7–6	8–5	6–6	5–7	—	6–6	6–7	5–7	5–8	9–4	6–7	5–7
Milwaukee	6–7	4–9	4–8	5–7	4–9	2–11	6–6	—	5–7	6–7	4–8	6–6	5–6	10–3
Minnesota	7–5	6–6	9–4	5–8	5–7	3–9	7–6	7–5	—	8–4	8–5	7–6	8–5	1–11
New York	8–5	6–7	4–8	5–7	11–2	6–7	7–5	7–6	4–8	—	8–4	7–5	6–6	8–5
Oakland	6–6	5–7	6–7	7–6	5–7	3–9	8–5	8–4	5–8	4–8	—	8–5	8–5	4–8
Seattle	3–9	8–4	4–9	8–5	4–8	6–6	4–9	6–6	6–7	5–7	5–8	—	10–3	5–7
Texas	3–9	7–5	8–5	8–5	3–9	2–10	7–6	6–5	5–8	6–6	5–8	3–10	—	6–6
Toronto	9–4	8–5	5–7	8–4	7–6–1	5–8	7–5	3–10	11–1	5–8	8–4	7–5	6–6	—

=== Notable transactions ===
- April 6, 1984: Jerry Ujdur was signed as a free agent by the Indians.
- April 7, 1984: DeWayne Buice was released by the Indians.
- May 8, 1984: Geno Petralli was purchased by the Indians from the Toronto Blue Jays.
- June 4, 1984: Cory Snyder was drafted by the Indians in the 1st round (4th pick) of the 1984 Major League Baseball draft.
- June 13, 1984: Rick Sutcliffe, George Frazier and Ron Hassey were traded by the Indians to the Chicago Cubs for Mel Hall, Joe Carter, Don Schulze, and Darryl Banks (minors).
- June 21, 1984: Dan Spillner was traded by the Indians to the Chicago White Sox for a player to be named later. The White Sox completed the deal by sending Jim Siwy to the Indians on June 26.
- September 24, 1984: Jamie Quirk was purchased by the Indians from the Chicago White Sox.

=== Opening Day Lineup ===
Opening Day Starters
#	Name	Position
2	Brett Butler	CF
4	Tony Bernazard	2B
14	Julio Franco	SS
29	Andre Thornton	DH
10	Pat Tabler	1B
26	Brook Jacoby	3B
9	Ron Hassey	C
24	George Vukovich	RF
20	Otis Nixon	LF
43	Rick Sutcliffe	P

=== Roster ===
1984 Cleveland Indians
Roster
Pitchers: 38 Luis Aponte; 49 Jeff Barkley; 32 Rick Behenna; 28 Bert Blyleven; 13 Ernie Camacho; 31 Steve Comer; 36 Jamie Easterly; 58,34 Steve Farr; 25 George Frazier; 44 Neal Heaton; 46 Mike Jeffcoat; 65 José Román; 50 Ramon Romero; 37 Don Schulze; 33 Roy Smith; 37 Dan Spillner; 43 Rick Sutcliffe; 43 Jerry Ujdur; 54 Tom Waddell	Catchers: 23 Chris Bando; 9 Ron Hassey; 9 Jamie Quirk; 53,16 Jerry Willard; Infielders: 4 Tony Bernazard; 22 Mike Fischlin; 14 Julio Franco; 21 Mike Hargrove; 26 Brook Jacoby; 11 Jeff Moronko; 17 Junior Noboa; 10 Pat Tabler	Outfielders: 2 Brett Butler; 30 Joe Carter; 8 Carmen Castillo; 27 Mel Hall; 20 Otis Nixon; 12 Kevin Rhomberg; 24 George Vukovich; Other batters: 15 Broderick Perkins; 29 Andre Thornton	Manager: 18 Pat Corrales; Coaches: 25 Bobby Bonds (Hitting); 45 John Goryl (Third Base); 47 Don McMahon (Pitching); 1 Ed Napoleon (First Base); 6 Dennis Sommers (Bullpen)

== Game log ==
=== Regular season ===
1984 regular season game log: 75–87–1 (Home: 41–39–1; Away: 34–48)
April: 10–9 (Home: 4–3; Away: 6–6)

#	Date	Time (ET)	Opponent	Score	Win	Loss	Save	Time of Game	Attendance	Record	Box/ Streak
16	April 27	7:35 p.m. EST	@ Tigers	8–4 (19)	**Aponte** (1–0)	Abbott (1–1)	—	5:44	34,112	10–6	W5
17	April 28	2:15 p.m. EST	@ Tigers	2–6	Morris (5–0)	**Behenna** (0–1)	—	2:25	28,253	10–7	L1
18	April 29	1:35 p.m. EDT	@ Tigers	1–6	Petry (3–1)	**Spillner** (0–1)	—	2:20	24,853	10–8	L2

May: 7–19–1 (Home: 3–8–1; Away: 4–11)

#	Date	Time (ET)	Opponent	Score	Win	Loss	Save	Time of Game	Attendance	Record	Box/ Streak
22	May 4	7:05 p.m. EDT	Tigers	2–9	Petry (4–1)	**Spillner** (0–2)	Hernández (3)	3:06	8,497	11–11	L1
23	May 5	1:35 p.m. EDT	Tigers	5–6	Abbott (2–1)	**Heaton** (2–3)	López (2)	2:57	9,282	11–12	L2
24	May 6	1:55 p.m. EDT	Tigers	5–6 (12)	López (3–0)	**Camacho** (0–2)	—	4:20	16,125	11–13	L3
29	May 13										

June: 14–14 (Home: 7–9; Away: 7–5)

#	Date	Time (ET)	Opponent	Score	Win	Loss	Save	Time of Game	Attendance	Record	Box/ Streak

July: 13–16 (Home: 5–7; Away: 8–9)

#	Date	Time (ET)	Opponent	Score	Win	Loss	Save	Time of Game	Attendance	Record	Box/ Streak
ASG	July 10	8:30 p.m. EDT	55th All-Star Game in San Francisco, CA	3 – 1 AL	—	—	—	2:29	57,756	—	ASG
96	July 23	7:05 p.m. EDT	Tigers	1–4	Morris (13–6)	**Blyleven** (9–4)	Bair (4)	3:09	16,576	41–54–1	L1
97	July 24	7:05 p.m. EDT	Tigers	5–9	Wilcox (10–6)	**Farr** (1–7)	—	3:21	15,578	41–55–1	L2
98	July 25	7:05 p.m. EDT	Tigers	4–1	**Smith** (4–2)	Rozema (7–2)	**Camacho** (12)	2:48	15,516	42–55–1	W1
—	July 26		Tigers	**Postponed (Rain; Site change)** (Makeup date: July 31)							
102	July 31 (1)	5:35 p.m. EDT	@ Tigers	1–5	Berenguer (5–7)	**Smith** (4–3)	—	2:30	—	43–58–1	L2
103	July 31 (2)	8:45 p.m. EDT	@ Tigers	6–4	**Heaton** (8–10)	Rozema (7–3)	**Waddell** (5)	2:50	32,158	44–58–1	W1

August: 16–18 (Home: 10–8; Away: 6–10)

#	Date	Time (ET)	Opponent	Score	Win	Loss	Save	Time of Game	Attendance	Record	Box/ Streak
104	August 1	7:35 p.m. EDT	@ Tigers	4–2	**Farr** (2–7)	Petry (14–5)	**Camacho** (13)	2:46	27,271	45–58–1	W2
105	August 2	1:30 p.m. EDT	@ Tigers	1–2	Morris (14–7)	**Blyleven** (10–5)	Hernández (22)	2:39	28,700	45–59–1	L1

September: 15–11 (Home: 10–4; Away: 5–7)

#	Date	Time (ET)	Opponent	Score	Win	Loss	Save	Time of Game	Attendance	Record	Box/ Streak

Legend: = Win = Loss = Eliminated from playoff race = Postponement
Bold = Indians team member

=== Detailed records ===
**American League**
Opponent	Home	Away	Total	Pct.	Runs scored	Runs allowed
**AL East**
**Cleveland Indians**	—	—	—	—	—	—
Detroit Tigers	1–5	3–4	4–9	.308	45	64
**Division Total**	**1–5**	**3–4**	**4–9**	**.308**	**45**	**64**
**AL West**
**Division Total**	**0–0**	**0–0**	**0–0**	–	**0**	**0**
**Season Total**	**1–5**	**3–4**	**4–9**	**.308**	**45**	**64**

== Player stats ==
=== Batting ===
Note: G = Games played; AB = At bats; R = Runs scored; H = Hits; 2B = Doubles; 3B = Triples; HR = Home runs; RBI = Runs batted in; AVG = Batting average; SB = Stolen bases

Player	G	AB	R	H	2B	3B	HR	RBI	AVG	SB
Chris Bando	75	220	38	64	11	0	12	41	.291	1
Tony Bernazard	140	439	44	97	15	4	2	38	.221	20
Brett Butler	159	602	108	162	25	9	3	49	.269	52
Joe Carter	66	244	32	67	6	1	13	41	.275	2
Carmelo Castillo	87	211	36	55	9	2	10	36	.261	1
Mike Fischlin	85	133	17	30	4	2	1	14	.226	2
Julio Franco	160	658	82	188	22	5	3	79	.286	19
Mel Hall	83	257	43	66	13	1	7	30	.257	1
Mike Hargrove	133	352	44	94	14	2	2	44	.267	0
Ron Hassey	48	149	11	38	5	1	0	19	.255	1
Brook Jacoby	126	439	64	116	19	3	7	40	.264	3
Jeff Moronko	7	19	1	3	1	0	0	3	.158	0
Otis Nixon	49	91	16	14	0	0	0	1	.154	12
Junior Noboa	23	11	3	4	0	0	0	0	.364	0
Broderick Perkins	58	66	5	13	1	0	0	4	.197	0
Jamie Quirk	1	1	1	1	0	0	1	1	1.000	0
Kevin Rhomberg	13	8	0	2	0	0	0	0	.250	0
Pat Tabler	144	473	66	137	21	3	10	68	.290	3
Andre Thornton	155	587	91	159	26	0	33	99	.271	6
George Vukovich	134	437	38	133	22	5	9	60	.304	1
Jerry Willard	87	246	21	55	8	1	10	37	.224	1
Team totals	162	5643	761	1498	222	39	123	704	.265	126

=== Pitching ===
Note: W = Wins; L = Losses; ERA = Earned run average; G = Games pitched; GS = Games started; SV = Saves; IP = Innings pitched; H = Hits allowed; R = Runs allowed; ER = Earned runs allowed; BB = Walks allowed; K = Strikeouts

Player	W	L	ERA	G	GS	SV	IP	H	R	ER	BB	K
Luis Aponte	1	0	4.11	25	0	0	50.1	53	25	23	15	25
Jeff Barkley	0	0	6.75	3	0	0	4.0	6	3	3	1	4
Rick Behenna	0	3	13.97	3	3	0	9.2	17	15	15	8	6
Bert Blyleven	19	7	2.87	33	32	0	245.0	204	86	78	74	170
Ernie Camacho	5	9	2.43	69	0	23	100.0	83	31	27	37	48
Steve Comer	4	8	5.68	22	20	0	117.1	146	80	74	39	39
Jamie Easterly	3	1	3.38	26	1	2	69.1	74	31	26	23	42
Steve Farr	3	11	4.58	31	16	1	116.0	106	61	59	46	83
George Frazier	3	2	3.65	22	0	1	44.1	45	19	18	14	24
Neal Heaton	12	15	5.21	38	34	0	198.2	231	128	115	75	75
Mike Jeffcoat	5	2	2.99	63	1	1	75.1	82	28	25	24	41
José Román	0	2	18.00	3	2	0	6.0	9	12	12	11	3
Ramon Romero	0	0	0.00	1	0	0	3.0	0	0	0	0	3
Don Schulze	3	6	4.83	19	14	0	85.2	105	53	46	27	39
Rick Sutcliffe	4	5	5.15	15	15	0	94.1	111	60	54	46	58
Jerry Ujdur	1	2	6.91	4	3	0	14.1	22	14	11	6	6
Tom Waddell	7	4	3.06	58	0	6	97.0	68	35	33	37	59
Team totals	75	87	4.26	162	162	35	1467.2	1523	766	694	545	803

== Awards and honors ==
All-Star Game

== Farm system ==
Level	Team	League	Manager
AAA	Maine Guides	International League	Doc Edwards
AA	Buffalo Bisons	Eastern League	Jack Aker
A	Waterloo Indians	Midwest League	Gomer Hodge
A-Short Season	Batavia Trojans	New York–Penn League	Eddie Bane
