= 1989 International League season =

- League: International League
- Sport: Baseball
- Duration: April 5 – September 9
- Games: 146
- Teams: 8

Regular season
- Season MVP: Tom O'Malley, Tidewater Tides

Governors' Cup Playoffs
- League champions: Richmond Braves
- Runners-up: Syracuse Chiefs

IL seasons
- ← 1988 1990 →

The 1989 International League was a Class AAA baseball season played between April 5 and September 9. Eight teams played a 146-game schedule, with the top team in each division qualifying for the Governors' Cup.

The Richmond Braves won the Governors' Cup, defeating the Syracuse Chiefs in the final round of the playoffs.

== Team changes ==
- The Maine Phillies relocated to Moosic, Pennsylvania, and were renamed the Scranton/Wilkes-Barre Red Barons. The club remained affiliated with the Philadelphia Phillies.
- The Richmond Braves and Tidewater Tides moved from the East Division to the West Division.
- The Rochester Red Wings and Syracuse Chiefs moved from the West Division to the East Division.

== Teams ==
1989 International League
Division	Team	City	MLB Affiliate	Stadium
East
East	Pawtucket Red Sox	Pawtucket, Rhode Island	Boston Red Sox	McCoy Stadium
East	Rochester Red Wings	Rochester, New York	Baltimore Orioles	Silver Stadium
East	Scranton/Wilkes-Barre Red Barons	Moosic, Pennsylvania	Philadelphia Phillies	Lackawanna County Stadium
East	Syracuse Chiefs	Syracuse, New York	Toronto Blue Jays	MacArthur Stadium
West
West	Columbus Clippers	Columbus, Ohio	New York Yankees	Cooper Stadium
West	Richmond Braves	Richmond, Virginia	Atlanta Braves	The Diamond
West	Tidewater Tides	Norfolk, Virginia	New York Mets	Met Park
West	Toledo Mud Hens	Toledo, Ohio	Detroit Tigers	Ned Skeldon Stadium

== Map of teams ==
East division West division

== Regular season ==
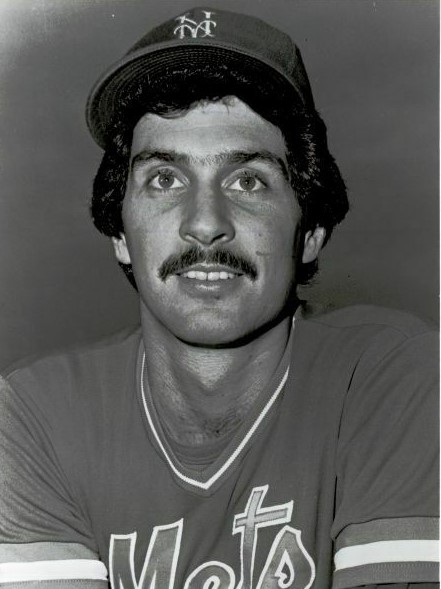
Charlie Puleo of the Richmond Braves pitched the first five innings in a combined no-hitter.

=== Summary ===
- The regular season scheduled was extended from 142-games to 146-games.
- The Syracuse Chiefs finished with the best record in the league for the first time since 1985.
- On June 27, Charlie Puleo and Steve Ziem of the Richmond Braves combined to pitch a no-hitter against the Oklahoma City 89ers.

=== Standings ===
East Division
Team	Win	Loss	%	GB
Syracuse Chiefs	83	62	.572	–
Rochester Red Wings	72	73	.497	11
Scranton/Wilkes-Barre Red Barons	64	79	.448	18
Pawtucket Red Sox	62	84	.425	21.5
West Division
Richmond Braves	81	65	.555	–
Columbus Clippers	77	69	.527	4
Tidewater Tides	77	69	.527	4
Toledo Mud Hens	69	76	.476	11.5

== League Leaders ==
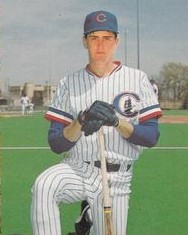
Hal Morris of the Columbus Clippers led the league with a .326 batting average.

=== Batting leaders ===
Stat	Player	Total
AVG	Hal Morris, Columbus Clippers	.326
H	Glenallen Hill, Syracuse Chiefs	155
R	Glenallen Hill, Syracuse Chiefs	86
2B	Tim Tolman, Syracuse Chiefs	33
3B	Glenallen Hill, Syracuse Chiefs	15
HR	Glenallen Hill, Syracuse Chiefs	21
RBI	Tom O'Malley, Tidewater Tides	84
SB	Tom Barrett, Scranton/Wilkes-Barre Red Barons	44

=== Pitching leaders ===
Stat	Player	Total
W	Gary Eave, Richmond Braves; Alex Sanchez, Syracuse Chiefs; Curt Schilling, Rochester Red Wings	13
ERA	José Núñez, Syracuse Chiefs	2.21
CG	Mike Rochford, Pawtucket Red Sox; Curt Schilling, Rochester Red Wings	9
SV	Dickie Noles, Columbus Clippers	19
SO	Kent Mercker, Richmond Braves	144
IP	Curt Schilling, Rochester Red Wings	185.1

== Playoffs ==
- The Richmond Braves won their third Governors' Cup, defeating the Syracuse Chiefs in four games.

=== Playoff bracket ===
Governors' Cup
E1	Syracuse	1
W1	Richmond	3

== Awards ==
International League awards
Award name	Recipient
Most Valuable Player	Tom O'Malley, Tidewater Tides
Pitcher of the Year	Alex Sanchez, Syracuse Chiefs
Rookie of the Year	Francisco Cabrera, Syracuse / Richmond
Manager of the Year	Bob Bailor, Syracuse Chiefs

== All-star team ==
International League all-star team
Position	All-star
Catcher	Francisco Cabrera, Syracuse / Richmond
First base	Hal Morris, Columbus Clippers
Second base	Mark Lemke, Richmond Braves
Shortstop	Randy Velarde, Columbus Clippers
Third base	Tom O'Malley, Tidewater Tides
Outfield	Butch Davis, Rochester Red Wings; Glenallen Hill, Syracuse Chiefs; Greg Tubbs, Richmond Braves
Designated hitter	Kevin Maas, Columbus Clippers
Starting pitcher	Alex Sanchez, Syracuse Chiefs
Relief pitcher	Mark Eichhorn, Richmond Braves

== See also ==
- 1989 Major League Baseball season
