= 1984 International League season =

- League: International League
- Sport: Baseball
- Duration: April 10 – September 13
- Games: 140
- Teams: 8

Regular season
- Season MVP: Scott Bradley, Columbus Clippers

Governors' Cup Playoffs
- League champions: Pawtucket Red Sox
- Runners-up: Maine Guides

IL seasons
- ← 1983 1985 →

The 1984 International League was a Class AAA baseball season played between April 10 and September 13. Eight teams played a 140-game schedule, with the top four teams qualifying for the post-season.

The Pawtucket Red Sox won the Governors' Cup, defeating the Maine Guides in the final round of the playoffs.

== Team changes ==
- The Charleston Charlies relocated to Old Orchard Beach, Maine and were renamed the Maine Guides. The club remained affiliated with the Cleveland Indians.

== Teams ==
1984 International League
Team	City	MLB Affiliate	Stadium
Columbus Clippers	Columbus, Ohio	New York Yankees	Franklin County Stadium
Maine Guides	Old Orchard Beach, Maine	Cleveland Indians	The Ball Park
Pawtucket Red Sox	Pawtucket, Rhode Island	Boston Red Sox	McCoy Stadium
Richmond Braves	Richmond, Virginia	Atlanta Braves	Parker Field
Rochester Red Wings	Rochester, New York	Baltimore Orioles	Silver Stadium
Syracuse Chiefs	Syracuse, New York	Toronto Blue Jays	MacArthur Stadium
Tidewater Tides	Norfolk, Virginia	New York Mets	Met Park
Toledo Mud Hens	Toledo, Ohio	Minnesota Twins	Lucas County Stadium

== Map of teams ==
International League teams

== Regular season ==
=== Summary ===
- The Columbus Clippers finished with the best record in the league for the fifth time in the past six seasons.

=== Standings ===
International League
Team	Win	Loss	%	GB
Columbus Clippers	82	57	.590	–
Maine Guides	77	59	.566	3.5
Toledo Mud Hens	74	63	.540	7
Pawtucket Red Sox	75	65	.536	7.5
Tidewater Tides	71	69	.507	11.5
Richmond Braves	66	73	.475	16
Syracuse Chiefs	58	81	.417	24
Rochester Red Wings	52	88	.371	30.5

== League Leaders ==
=== Batting leaders ===
Stat	Player	Total
AVG	Scott Bradley, Columbus Clippers	.335
H	Scott Bradley, Columbus Clippers	180
R	Milt Thompson, Richmond Braves; Chico Walker, Pawtucket Red Sox	91
2B	Dan Briggs, Columbus Clippers	33
3B	Bobby Meacham, Columbus Clippers; Vic Rodriguez, Rochester Red Wings; Paul Zuvella, Richmond Braves	6
HR	Jerry Keller, Syracuse Chiefs	28
RBI	Scott Bradley, Columbus Clippers; Jim Wilson, Maine Guides	84
SB	Tack Wilson, Toledo Mud Hens	48

=== Pitching leaders ===
Stat	Player	Total
W	Jerry Ujdur, Maine Guides	14
ERA	Jim Deshaies, Columbus Clippers	2.39
CG	Brad Havens, Toledo Mud Hens	12
SV	Wes Gardner, Tidewater Tides	20
SO	Brad Havens, Toledo Mud Hens	169
IP	Mike Morgan, Syracuse Chiefs	185.2

== Playoffs ==
- The Pawtucket Red Sox won their second Governors' Cup, defeating the Maine Guides in five games.

=== Playoff bracket ===
Semi-finals
1	Columbus	1
4	Pawtucket	3
2	Maine	3
3	Toledo	0

Governors' Cup
4	Pawtucket	3
2	Maine	2

== Awards ==
International League awards
Award name	Recipient
Most Valuable Player	Scott Bradley, Columbus Clippers
Pitcher of the Year	Brad Havens, Toledo Mud Hens
Rookie of the Year	Scott Bradley, Columbus Clippers
Manager of the Year	Tony Torchia, Pawtucket Red Sox

== All-star team ==
International League all-star team
Position	All-star
Catcher	Scott Bradley, Columbus Clippers
First base	Dan Briggs, Columbus Clippers
Second base	Rex Hudler, Columbus Clippers
Shortstop	Paul Zuvella, Richmond Braves
Third base	Steve Lyons, Pawtucket Red Sox
Outfield	John Christensen, Tidewater Tides; Milt Thompson, Richmond Braves; Mitch Webster, Syracuse Chiefs
Designated hitter	Jerry Keller, Syracuse Chiefs
Starting pitcher	Brad Havens, Toledo Mud Hens
Relief pitcher	Wes Gardner, Tidewater Tides

== See also ==
- 1984 Major League Baseball season
