= 1983 International League season =

- League: International League
- Sport: Baseball
- Duration: April 12 – September 11
- Games: 140
- Teams: 8

Regular season
- Season MVP: Tim Teufel, Toledo Mud Hens

Governors' Cup Playoffs
- League champions: Tidewater Tides
- Runners-up: Richmond Braves

IL seasons
- ← 1982 1984 →

The 1983 International League was a Class AAA baseball season played between April 12 and September 11. Eight teams played a 140-game schedule, with the top four teams qualifying for the post-season.

The Tidewater Tides won the Governors' Cup, defeating the Richmond Braves in the final round of the playoffs.

== Teams ==
1983 International League
Team	City	MLB Affiliate	Stadium
Charleston Charlies	Charleston, West Virginia	Cleveland Indians	Watt Powell Park
Columbus Clippers	Columbus, Ohio	New York Yankees	Franklin County Stadium
Pawtucket Red Sox	Pawtucket, Rhode Island	Boston Red Sox	McCoy Stadium
Richmond Braves	Richmond, Virginia	Atlanta Braves	Parker Field
Rochester Red Wings	Rochester, New York	Baltimore Orioles	Silver Stadium
Syracuse Chiefs	Syracuse, New York	Toronto Blue Jays	MacArthur Stadium
Tidewater Tides	Norfolk, Virginia	New York Mets	Met Park
Toledo Mud Hens	Toledo, Ohio	Minnesota Twins	Lucas County Stadium

== Map of teams ==
International League teams

== Regular season ==
=== Summary ===
- The Columbus Clippers finished with the best record in the league for the fourth time in the past five seasons.

=== Standings ===
International League
Team	Win	Loss	%	GB
Columbus Clippers	83	57	.593	–
Richmond Braves	80	59	.576	2.5
Charleston Charlies	74	66	.529	9
Tidewater Tides	71	68	.511	11.5
Toledo Mud Hens	68	72	.486	15
Rochester Red Wings	65	75	.464	18
Syracuse Chiefs	61	78	.439	21.5
Pawtucket Red Sox	56	83	.403	26.5

== League Leaders ==
=== Batting leaders ===
Stat	Player	Total
AVG	Jack Perconte, Charleston Charlies	.346
H	Otis Nixon, Columbus Clippers	162
R	Otis Nixon, Columbus Clippers	129
2B	Clint Hurdle, Tidewater Tides	33
3B	Albert Hall, Richmond Braves	11
HR	Brian Dayett, Columbus Clippers	35
RBI	Brian Dayett, Columbus Clippers	108
SB	Otis Nixon, Columbus Clippers	94

=== Pitching leaders ===
Stat	Player	Total
W	Mark Bomback, Syracuse Chiefs; Dennis Rasmussen, Columbus Clippers	13
ERA	Tom Brennan, Charleston Charlies	3.31
CG	Bob Walk, Richmond Braves	11
SV	Curt Kaufman, Columbus Clippers	25
SO	Dennis Rasmussen, Columbus Clippers	187
IP	Bob Walk, Richmond Braves	185

== Playoffs ==
- The Tidewater Tides won their second consecutive Governors' Cup, and fourth overall, defeating the Richmond Braves in four games.

=== Playoff bracket ===
Semi-finals
1	Columbus	2
4	Tidewater	3
2	Richmond	3
3	Charleston	0

Governors' Cup
4	Tidewater	3
2	Richmond	1

== Awards ==
International League awards
Award name	Recipient
Most Valuable Player	Tim Teufel, Toledo Mud Hens
Pitcher of the Year	Walt Terrell, Tidewater Tides
Rookie of the Year	Brad Komminsk, Richmond Braves
Manager of the Year	Doc Edwards, Charleston Charlies

== All-star team ==
International League all-star team
Position	All-star
Catcher	Geno Petralli, Syracuse Chiefs
First base	Gerald Perry, Richmond Braves
Second base	Tim Teufel, Toledo Mud Hens
Shortstop	Tony Fernández, Syracuse Chiefs
Third base	Brook Jacoby, Richmond Braves
Outfield	Brian Dayett, Columbus Clippers; Brad Komminsk, Richmond Braves; Otis Nixon, Columbus Clippers
Designated hitter	Karl Pagel, Charleston Charlies
Starting pitcher	Walt Terrell, Tidewater Tides
Relief pitcher	Don Cooper, Syracuse Chiefs
Manager	Doc Edwards, Charleston Charlies

== See also ==
- 1983 Major League Baseball season
