= 1986 International League season =

- League: International League
- Sport: Baseball
- Duration: April 11 – September 11
- Games: 140
- Teams: 8

Regular season
- Season MVP: Pat Dodson, Pawtucket Red Sox

Governors' Cup Playoffs
- League champions: Richmond Braves
- Runners-up: Rochester Red Wings

IL seasons
- ← 1985 1987 →

The 1986 International League was a Class AAA baseball season played between April 11 and September 11. Eight teams played a 140-game schedule, with the top four teams qualifying for the post-season.

The Richmond Braves won the Governors' Cup, defeating the Rochester Red Wings in the final round of the playoffs.

== Teams ==
1986 International League
Team	City	MLB Affiliate	Stadium
Columbus Clippers	Columbus, Ohio	New York Yankees	Cooper Stadium
Maine Guides	Old Orchard Beach, Maine	Cleveland Indians	The Ball Park
Pawtucket Red Sox	Pawtucket, Rhode Island	Boston Red Sox	McCoy Stadium
Richmond Braves	Richmond, Virginia	Atlanta Braves	The Diamond
Rochester Red Wings	Rochester, New York	Baltimore Orioles	Silver Stadium
Syracuse Chiefs	Syracuse, New York	Toronto Blue Jays	MacArthur Stadium
Tidewater Tides	Norfolk, Virginia	New York Mets	Met Park
Toledo Mud Hens	Toledo, Ohio	Minnesota Twins	Lucas County Stadium

== Map of teams ==
International League teams

== Regular season ==
=== Summary ===
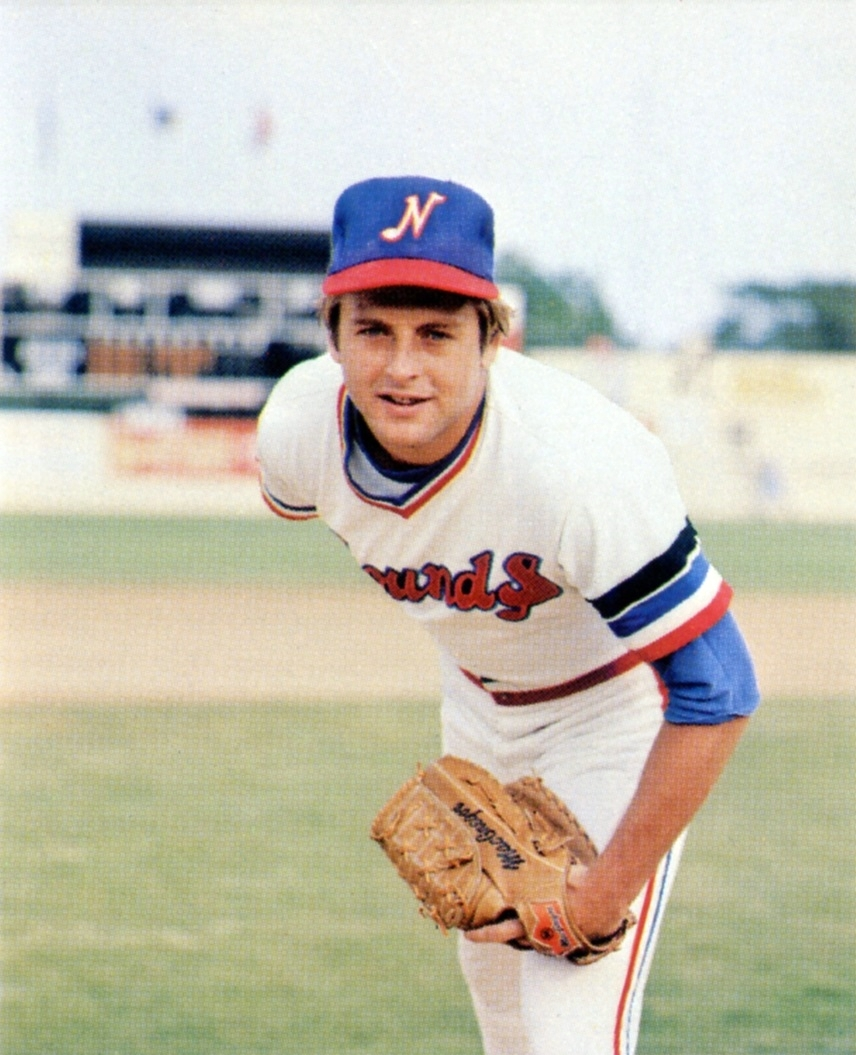
Don Cooper of the Syracuse Chiefs pitched five innings in a seven inning no-hitter against the Richmond Braves.

- The Richmond Braves finished with the best record in the league for the first time since 1982.
- On August 16, Don Cooper and Colin McLaughlin of the Syracuse Chiefs combined to pitch a seven inning no-hitter in a 4-0 win against the Richmond Braves at The Diamond in Richmond, Virginia.

=== Standings ===
International League
Team	Win	Loss	%	GB
Richmond Braves	80	60	.571	–
Rochester Red Wings	75	63	.543	4
Pawtucket Red Sox	74	65	.532	5.5
Tidewater Tides	74	66	.529	6
Syracuse Chiefs	72	67	.518	7.5
Columbus Clippers	62	77	.446	17.5
Toledo Mud Hens	62	77	.446	17.5
Maine Guides	58	82	.414	22

== League Leaders ==
=== Batting leaders ===
Stat	Player	Total
AVG	Andre David, Pawtucket Red Sox	.328
H	Mike Sharperson, Syracuse Chiefs	150
R	Mike Sharperson, Syracuse Chiefs	86
2B	Leo Hernández, Columbus Clippers	35
3B	Mike Sharperson, Syracuse Chiefs	9
HR	Ken Gerhart, Rochester Red Wings	28
RBI	Pat Dodson, Pawtucket Red Sox	102
SB	Albert Hall, Richmond Braves	72

=== Pitching leaders ===
Stat	Player	Total
W	Charlie Puleo, Richmond Braves	14
ERA	Doug Jones, Maine Guides	2.09
CG	Charlie Puleo, Richmond Braves; Bill Swaggerty, Rochester Red Wings	9
SV	Luis DeLeón, Rochester Red Wings	13
SO	Charlie Puleo, Richmond Braves; Steve Shields	124
IP	Brad Arnsberg, Columbus Clippers	177.1

== Playoffs ==
- The Richmond Braves won their second Governors' Cup, defeating the Rochester Red Wings in five games.

=== Playoff bracket ===
Semi-finals
1	Richmond	3
4	Tidewater	0
2	Rochester	3
3	Pawtucket	1

Governors' Cup
1	Richmond	3
2	Pawtucket	2

== Awards ==
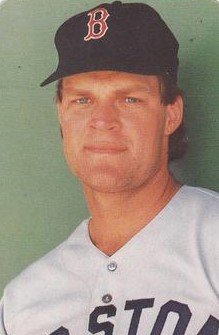
Pat Dodson of the Pawtucket Red Sox won the MVP Award and was named to the all-star team.

International League awards
Award name	Recipient
Most Valuable Player	Pat Dodson, Pawtucket Red Sox
Pitcher of the Year	John Mitchell, Tidewater Tides
Rookie of the Year	Orestes Destrade, Columbus Clippers
Manager of the Year	John Hart, Rochester Red Wings

== All-star team ==
International League all-star team
Position	All-star
Catcher	Pat Dempsey, Toledo Mud Hens
First base	Pat Dodson, Pawtucket Red Sox
Second base	Mike Sharperson, Syracuse Chiefs
Shortstop	Paul Zuvella, Richmond / Columbus
Third base	Dave Magadan, Tidewater Tides
Outfield	Mike Greenwell, Pawtucket Red Sox; Gerald Perry, Richmond Braves; La Schelle Tarver, Pawtucket Red Sox
Designated hitter	Pete Dalena, Columbus Clippers
Starting pitcher	John Mitchell, Tidewater Tides
Relief pitcher	Randy Myers, Tidewater Tides

== See also ==
- 1986 Major League Baseball season
