= 1987 International League season =

- League: International League
- Sport: Baseball
- Duration: April 10 – September 9
- Games: 140
- Teams: 8

Regular season
- Season MVP: Randy Milligan, Tidewater Tides

Governors' Cup Playoffs
- League champions: Columbus Clippers
- Runners-up: Tidewater Tides

IL seasons
- ← 1986 1988 →

The 1987 International League was a Class AAA baseball season played between April 10 and September 9. Eight teams played a 140-game schedule, with the top four teams qualifying for the post-season.

The Columbus Clippers won the Governors' Cup, defeating the Tidewater Tides in the final round of the playoffs.

== Team changes ==
- The Maine Guides ended their affiliation with the Cleveland Indians and began a new affiliation with the Philadelphia Phillies.
- The Toledo Mud Hens ended their affiliation with the Minnesota Twins and began a new affiliation with the Detroit Tigers.

== Teams ==
1987 International League
Team	City	MLB Affiliate	Stadium
Columbus Clippers	Columbus, Ohio	New York Yankees	Cooper Stadium
Maine Guides	Old Orchard Beach, Maine	Philadelphia Phillies	The Ball Park
Pawtucket Red Sox	Pawtucket, Rhode Island	Boston Red Sox	McCoy Stadium
Richmond Braves	Richmond, Virginia	Atlanta Braves	The Diamond
Rochester Red Wings	Rochester, New York	Baltimore Orioles	Silver Stadium
Syracuse Chiefs	Syracuse, New York	Toronto Blue Jays	MacArthur Stadium
Tidewater Tides	Norfolk, Virginia	New York Mets	Met Park
Toledo Mud Hens	Toledo, Ohio	Detroit Tigers	Lucas County Stadium

== Map of teams ==
International League teams

== Regular season ==
=== Summary ===
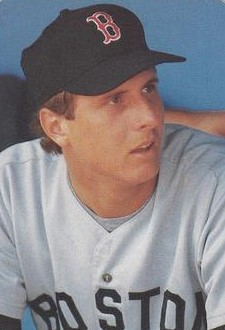
Steve Curry of the Pawtucket Red Sox pitched a no-hitter against the Richmond Braves.

- The Tidewater Tides finished with the best record in the league for the first time since 1975.
- On July 6, Steve Curry of the Pawtucket Red Sox pitched a no-hitter in an 11-0 win over the Richmond Braves.

=== Standings ===
International League
Team	Win	Loss	%	GB
Tidewater Tides	81	59	.579	–
Columbus Clippers	77	63	.550	4
Rochester Red Wings	74	65	.532	6.5
Pawtucket Red Sox	73	67	.521	8
Toledo Mud Hens	70	70	.500	11
Syracuse Chiefs	68	72	.486	13
Maine Guides	60	80	.429	21
Richmond Braves	56	83	.403	24.5

== League Leaders ==
=== Batting leaders ===
Stat	Player	Total
AVG	Randy Milligan, Tidewater Tides	.326
H	Kevin Elster, Tidewater Tides	170
R	Randy Milligan, Tidewater Tides	99
2B	Mark Carreon, Tidewater Tides	41
3B	Sil Campusano, Syracuse Chiefs; Rob Ducey, Syracuse Chiefs; Nelson Liriano, Syracuse Chiefs	10
HR	Jay Buhner, Columbus Clippers	31
RBI	Randy Milligan, Tidewater Tides	103
SB	Roberto Kelly, Columbus Clippers	51

=== Pitching leaders ===
Stat	Player	Total
W	Paul Gibson, Toledo Mud Hens	14
ERA	DeWayne Vaughn, Tidewater Tides	2.66
CG	Brad Arnsberg, Columbus Clippers	9
SV	Mike Kinnunen, Rochester Red Wings	16
SO	Odell Jones, Syracuse Chiefs	147
IP	Don Heinkel, Toledo Mud Hens	187.1

== Playoffs ==
- The Columbus Clippers won their fourth Governors' Cup, defeating the Tidewater Tides in three games.

=== Playoff bracket ===
Semi-finals
1	Tidewater	3
4	Pawtucket	1
2	Columbus	3
3	Rochester	0

Governors' Cup
1	Tidewater	0
2	Columbus	3

== Awards ==
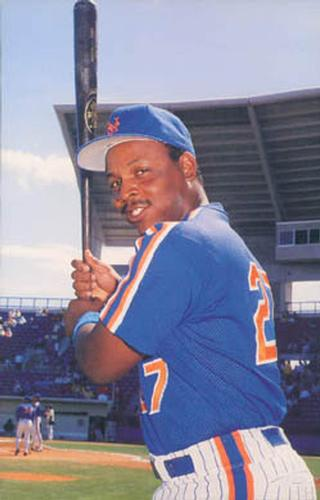
Randy Milligan of the Tidewater Tides was the Rookie of the Year and won the MVP Award.

International League awards
Award name	Recipient
Most Valuable Player	Randy Milligan, Tidewater Tides
Pitcher of the Year	Brad Arnsberg, Columbus Clippers
Rookie of the Year	Randy Milligan, Tidewater Tides
Manager of the Year	Ed Nottle, Pawtucket Red Sox

== All-star team ==
International League all-star team
Position	All-star
Catcher	Rey Palacios, Toledo Mud Hens
First base	Randy Milligan, Tidewater Tides
Second base	Nelson Liriano, Syracuse Chiefs
Shortstop	Kevin Elster, Tidewater Tides
Third base	Jeff Moronko, Columbus Clippers
Outfield	Jay Buhner, Columbus Clippers; Mark Carreon, Tidewater Tides; Roberto Kelly, Columbus Clippers
Designated hitter	Sam Horn, Pawtucket Red Sox
Starting pitcher	Brad Arnsberg, Columbus Clippers
Relief pitcher	Don Gordon, Syracuse Chiefs

== See also ==
- 1987 Major League Baseball season
