= 1985 International League season =

- League: International League
- Sport: Baseball
- Duration: April 10 – September 13
- Games: 140
- Teams: 8

Regular season
- Season MVP: Dan Pasqua, Columbus Clippers

Governors' Cup Playoffs
- League champions: Tidewater Tides
- Runners-up: Columbus Clippers

IL seasons
- ← 1984 1986 →

The 1985 International League was a Class AAA baseball season played between April 10 and September 13. Eight teams played a 140-game schedule, with the top four teams qualifying for the post-season.

The Tidewater Tides won the Governors' Cup, defeating the Columbus Clippers in the final round of the playoffs.

== Teams ==
1985 International League
Team	City	MLB Affiliate	Stadium
Columbus Clippers	Columbus, Ohio	New York Yankees	Cooper Stadium
Maine Guides	Old Orchard Beach, Maine	Cleveland Indians	The Ball Park
Pawtucket Red Sox	Pawtucket, Rhode Island	Boston Red Sox	McCoy Stadium
Richmond Braves	Richmond, Virginia	Atlanta Braves	The Diamond
Rochester Red Wings	Rochester, New York	Baltimore Orioles	Silver Stadium
Syracuse Chiefs	Syracuse, New York	Toronto Blue Jays	MacArthur Stadium
Tidewater Tides	Norfolk, Virginia	New York Mets	Met Park
Toledo Mud Hens	Toledo, Ohio	Minnesota Twins	Lucas County Stadium

== Map of teams ==
International League teams

== Regular season ==
=== Summary ===
- The Syracuse Chiefs finished with the best record in the league for the first time since 1970.

=== Standings ===
International League
Team	Win	Loss	%	GB
Syracuse Chiefs	79	61	.564	–
Maine Guides	76	63	.547	2.5
Tidewater Tides	75	64	.540	3.5
Columbus Clippers	75	64	.540	3.5
Richmond Braves	75	65	.536	4
Toledo Mud Hens	71	68	.511	7.5
Rochester Red Wings	58	81	.417	20.5
Pawtucket Red Sox	48	91	.345	30.5

== League Leaders ==
=== Batting leaders ===
Stat	Player	Total
AVG	Juan Bonilla, Columbus Clippers	.330
H	Mike Sharperson, Syracuse Chiefs	155
R	Mike Sharperson, Syracuse Chiefs	86
2B	Billy Beane, Tidewater Tides	34
3B	Mike Sharperson, Syracuse Chiefs	7
HR	Jim Wilson, Maine Guides	26
RBI	Jim Wilson, Maine Guides	101
SB	Dwight Taylor, Maine Guides	52

=== Pitching leaders ===
Stat	Player	Total
W	Dennis Burtt, Toledo Mud Hens; Stan Clarke, Syracuse Chiefs	14
ERA	Don Gordon, Syracuse Chiefs	2.07
CG	Bill Swaggerty, Rochester Red Wings	10
SV	Wes Gardner, Tidewater Tides; Tom Henke, Syracuse Chiefs	18
SO	Brad Havens, Rochester Red Wings	129
IP	Bill Swaggerty, Rochester Red Wings	189

== Playoffs ==
- The Tidewater Tides won their third Governors' Cup in four seasons, and their fifth overall, defeating the Columbus Clippers in four games.

=== Playoff bracket ===
Semi-finals
1	Syracuse	1
4	Columbus	3
2	Maine	2
3	Tidewater	3

Governors' Cup
4	Columbus	1
3	Tidewater	3

== Awards ==
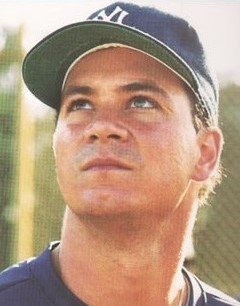
Dan Pasqua of the Columbus Clippers was named the Most Valuable Player, Rookie of the Year and to the International League all-star team.

International League awards
Award name	Recipient
Most Valuable Player	Dan Pasqua, Columbus Clippers
Pitcher of the Year	Tom Henke, Syracuse Chiefs
Rookie of the Year	Dan Pasqua, Columbus Clippers
Manager of the Year	Doug Ault, Syracuse Chiefs

== All-star team ==
International League all-star team
Position	All-star
Catcher	Larry Owen, Richmond Braves
First base	Jim Wilson, Maine Guides
Second base	Mike Sharperson, Syracuse Chiefs
Shortstop	Kelly Paris, Rochester Red Wings
Third base	Kelly Gruber, Syracuse Chiefs
Outfield	Billy Beane, Tidewater Tides; Rick Leach, Syracuse Chiefs; Dan Pasqua, Columbus Clippers
Designated hitter	Willie Aikens, Syracuse Chiefs
Pitcher	John Cerutti, Syracuse Chiefs; Stan Clarke, Syracuse Chiefs; Tom Henke, Syracuse Chiefs; Bill Latham, Tidewater Tides

== See also ==
- 1985 Major League Baseball season
