= 1990 International League season =

- League: International League
- Sport: Baseball
- Duration: April 6 – September 8
- Games: 146
- Teams: 8

Regular season
- Season MVP: Hensley Meulens, Columbus Clippers

Governors' Cup Playoffs
- League champions: Rochester Red Wings
- Runners-up: Columbus Clippers

IL seasons
- ← 1989 1991 →

The 1990 International League was a Class AAA baseball season played between April 6 and September 8. Eight teams played a 146-game schedule, with the top team in each division qualifying for the Governors' Cup.

The Rochester Red Wings won the Governors' Cup, defeating the Columbus Clippers in the final round of the playoffs.

== Teams ==
1990 International League
Division	Team	City	MLB Affiliate	Stadium
East
East	Pawtucket Red Sox	Pawtucket, Rhode Island	Boston Red Sox	McCoy Stadium
East	Rochester Red Wings	Rochester, New York	Baltimore Orioles	Silver Stadium
East	Scranton/Wilkes-Barre Red Barons	Moosic, Pennsylvania	Philadelphia Phillies	Lackawanna County Stadium
East	Syracuse Chiefs	Syracuse, New York	Toronto Blue Jays	MacArthur Stadium
West
West	Columbus Clippers	Columbus, Ohio	New York Yankees	Cooper Stadium
West	Richmond Braves	Richmond, Virginia	Atlanta Braves	The Diamond
West	Tidewater Tides	Norfolk, Virginia	New York Mets	Met Park
West	Toledo Mud Hens	Toledo, Ohio	Detroit Tigers	Ned Skeldon Stadium

== Map of teams ==
East division West division

== Regular season ==
=== Summary ===
- The Rochester Red Wings finished with the best record in the league for the first time since 1988.

=== Standings ===
East Division
Team	Win	Loss	%	GB
Rochester Red Wings	89	56	.614	–
Scranton/Wilkes-Barre Red Barons	68	78	.466	21.5
Syracuse Chiefs	62	83	.428	27
Pawtucket Red Sox	62	84	.425	27.5
West Division
Columbus Clippers	87	59	.596	–
Tidewater Tides	79	67	.541	8
Richmond Braves	71	74	.490	15.5
Toledo Mud Hens	58	86	.403	28

== League Leaders ==
=== Batting leaders ===
Stat	Player	Total
AVG	Jim Eppard, Syracuse Chiefs	.310
H	Jim Eppard, Syracuse Chiefs	143
R	Leo Gómez, Rochester Red Wings	97
2B	Torey Lovullo, Toledo Mud Hens	38
3B	Mickey Morandini, Scranton/Wilkes-Barre Red Barons	10
HR	Phil Plantier, Pawtucket Red Sox	33
RBI	Leo Gómez, Rochester Red Wings	97
SB	Milt Cuyler, Toledo Mud Hens	52

=== Pitching leaders ===
Stat	Player	Total
W	Dave Eiland, Columbus Clippers	16
ERA	Paul Marak, Richmond Braves	2.49
CG	Dave Eiland, Columbus Clippers	11
SV	Todd Frohwirth, Scranton/Wilkes-Barre Red Barons	21
SO	Manny Hernández, Tidewater Tides	157
IP	Doug Linton, Syracuse Chiefs	177.1

== Playoffs ==
- The Rochester Red Wings won their ninth Governors' Cup, defeating the Columbus Clippers in five games.

=== Playoff bracket ===
Governors' Cup
E1	Rochester	3
W1	Columbus	2

== Awards ==
International League awards
Award name	Recipient
Most Valuable Player	Hensley Meulens, Columbus Clippers
Pitcher of the Year	Dave Eiland, Columbus Clippers
Rookie of the Year	Phil Plantier, Pawtucket Red Sox
Manager of the Year	Greg Biagini, Rochester Red Wings

== All-star team ==
International League all-star team
Position	All-star
Catcher	Brian Dorsett, Columbus Clippers
First base	David Segui, Rochester Red Wings
Second base	Luis Sojo, Syracuse Chiefs
Shortstop	Tim Naehring, Pawtucket Red Sox
Third base	Leo Gómez, Rochester Red Wings
Outfield	Hensley Meulens, Columbus Clippers; Phil Plantier, Pawtucket Red Sox; Mark Whiten, Syracuse Chiefs
Designated hitter	Chris Hoiles, Rochester Red Wings
Starting pitcher	Dave Eiland, Columbus Clippers
Relief pitcher	Todd Frohwirth, Scranton/Wilkes-Barre Red Barons

== See also ==
- 1990 Major League Baseball season
