= Kevin Rhomberg =

American baseball player (born 1955)

- Left fielder
- Born: November 22, 1955 (age 70); Dubuque, Iowa, U.S.
- Batted: Right Threw: Right

MLB debut
- June 9, 1982, for the Cleveland Indians

Last MLB appearance
- June 5, 1984, for the Cleveland Indians

MLB statistics
- Batting average: .383
- Home runs: 1
- Runs batted in: 3
- Stats at Baseball Reference

Teams
- Cleveland Indians (1982–1984)

Kevin Jay Rhomberg (born November 22, 1955) is an American former left fielder in Major League Baseball (MLB). He was selected by the Cleveland Indians of the American League in the 14th round of the 1977 amateur draft, and made his major league debut on June 9, 1982. While Rhomberg's career consisted of just 41 games (his final game was on June 5, 1984) he batted an impressive .383 with an on-base percentage of .423. Not known for his defense, Rhomberg was considered primarily an outfielder.

Rhomberg was known not just for his hitting, but also for his compulsions. His main compulsion was the need to touch back someone who had just touched him.

== Early life ==
Rhomberg was born and raised in Dubuque, Iowa, where his father worked for a meatpacking company. He played basketball and baseball in high school and led his baseball team to the school's first state championship. It was during high school that he met Denice, his future wife.

In 1974, Rhomberg attended Lewis University in Illinois where he was a part of the NAIA World Series Championship baseball team. In 1976 he transferred to the University of St. Francis, where he was selected in the 1977 draft by the Cleveland Indians.

== Playing career ==
By 1981, Rhomberg was playing with the Class AA Chattanooga Lookouts of the Southern League. That year he led the Southern League in hits (187), triples (14), stolen bases (74), batting average (.366) and on-base percentage (.457); he finished second in runs scored (104). After the 1981 season, the Indians traded second baseman Duane Kuiper to the San Francisco Giants for pitcher Ed Whitson. Indians vice president Phil Seghi named Rhomberg as one of two players likely to become the starting second baseman on the 1982 Indians.

Rhomberg spent most of the 1982 season in Class AAA, and he was called up to the major leagues with the Indians in September of that year. In his major league debut on September 8, which Rhomberg said was the first birthday of his son Kevin Jr, Rhomberg hit a home run. Several players shared the second base duties that year for the Indians; Rhomberg appeared in 16 games, mostly as a left fielder or pinch runner. Before the 1983 season, the Indians sent Rhomberg back to the Class AAA Charleston Charlies. He was called back up to the Indians in September 1983. He finished his major league career with the 1984 Indians, playing in 13 games. Over his 41-game major league career, Rhomberg had 18 hits in 47 at bats for a .383 batting average. He retired after spending the 1985 season in Class AAA with the Phoenix Giants.

Cleveland teammates, including former player and manager Mike Hargrove, called Rhomberg, "Touch Me, Touch Me", and it is reported that opposing players and teammates, loved nothing more than to touch Rhomberg and then run off, sending him into a near panic. According to one story, former Indians teammate Rick Sutcliffe once reached under a bathroom stall to touch Rhomberg on the toe. Not knowing who the culprit was, Rhomberg went around the clubhouse and touched each player. Brook Jacoby tagged Rhomberg with a ball in the minors, then threw it out of the stadium. Jacoby said that Rhomberg spent two hours looking for the ball before finding it. An umpire once halted play during a game in New York to tell Yankees players to stop touching Rhomberg. If a person eluded his return touch, Rhomberg would send a letter that said, "This constitutes a touch."

Another compulsion was that Rhomberg refused to make any right-hand turns on the baseball field, reasoning that the allocation of the bases meant for players only to turn left. If the ball was hit to his right while playing in the outfield, Rhomberg would turn to the left and then make a full circle.

== Post-playing career ==
Following his playing career, Rhomberg was a scout for the Cleveland Indians. He spent most of the 1990s as a college baseball head coach, first at Cleveland State University and then at Lakeland Community College. Since then he owned, operated, and consulted for minor league baseball clubs. Rhomberg lives in Ohio and used to own the Lorain County Ironmen, a team in the Great Lakes Summer Collegiate League, a wood-bat league that gives college players the chance to play during the college off-season. The Ironmen were managed by Rhomberg's close friend, former Cleveland Indians teammate Joe Charboneau. Rhomberg's son, Joe Rhomberg, also used to be a member of the Ironmen coaching staff. The team plays its home games at the Pipe Yard in Lorain, Ohio. He also has a family in Ohio made up of his wife, four kids, and ten grandkids.

Rhomberg was named one of the Top 10 Most Superstitious Athletes by Men's Fitness.
