= 1988 International League season =

- League: International League
- Sport: Baseball
- Duration: April 7 – September 9
- Games: 142
- Teams: 8

Regular season
- Season MVP: Craig Worthington, Rochester Red Wings

Governors' Cup Playoffs
- League champions: Rochester Red Wings
- Runners-up: Tidewater Tides

IL seasons
- ← 1987 1989 →

The 1988 International League was a Triple-A baseball season played between April 7 and September 9. Eight teams played a 142-game schedule, with the top teams in each division qualifying for the Governors' Cup.

The Rochester Red Wings won the Governors' Cup, defeating the Tidewater Tides in the final round of the playoffs.

== League changes ==
- The league split into two four-team divisions, the East Division and the West Division. The top team in each division met for the Governors' Cup.
- This was the first year of the Triple-A Alliance in which the International League and American Association played 40 interleague games per team.

== Team changes ==
- The Maine Guides were renamed the Maine Phillies. They continued their affiliation with the Philadelphia Phillies.
- The Toledo Mud Hens ended their affiliation with the Minnesota Twins and began a new affiliation with the Detroit Tigers.

== Teams ==
1988 International League
Division	Team	City	MLB Affiliate	Stadium
East
East	Maine Phillies	Old Orchard Beach, Maine	Philadelphia Phillies	The Ball Park
East	Pawtucket Red Sox	Pawtucket, Rhode Island	Boston Red Sox	McCoy Stadium
East	Richmond Braves	Richmond, Virginia	Atlanta Braves	The Diamond
East	Tidewater Tides	Norfolk, Virginia	New York Mets	Met Park
West
West	Columbus Clippers	Columbus, Ohio	New York Yankees	Cooper Stadium
West	Rochester Red Wings	Rochester, New York	Baltimore Orioles	Silver Stadium
West	Syracuse Chiefs	Syracuse, New York	Toronto Blue Jays	MacArthur Stadium
West	Toledo Mud Hens	Toledo, Ohio	Detroit Tigers	Ned Skeldon Stadium

== Map of teams ==
East division West division

== Regular season ==
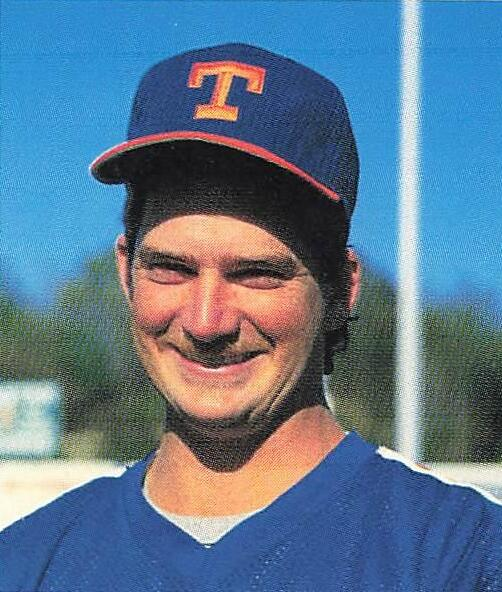
John Mitchell of the Tidewater Tides pitched a perfect game against the Indianapolis Indians.

=== Summary ===
- The regular season scheduled was extended from 140-games to 142-games.
- The Tidewater Tides and Rochester Red Wings tied for the best record in the league, with each team winning their division.
- On June 27, John Mitchell of the Tidewater Tides pitched a seven-inning perfect game against the Indianapolis Indians.
- On July 28, Marvin Freeman of the Maine Phillies pitched a seven-inning no-hitter against the Richmond Braves.

=== Standings ===
East Division
Team	Win	Loss	%	GB
Tidewater Tides	77	64	.546	–
Richmond Braves	66	75	.468	11
Pawtucket Red Sox	63	79	.444	14.5
Maine Phillies	62	80	.437	15.5
West Division
Rochester Red Wings	77	64	.546	–
Syracuse Chiefs	70	71	.496	7
Columbus Clippers	65	77	.458	12.5
Toledo Mud Hens	58	84	.408	19.5

== League Leaders ==
=== Batting leaders ===
Stat	Player	Total
AVG	Steve Finley, Rochester Red Wings	.314
H	Steve Finley, Rochester Red Wings	143
R	Tom Barrett, Maine Phillies; Jeff Wetherby, Richmond Braves; Eric Yelding, Syracuse Chiefs	69
2B	Gerónimo Berroa, Syracuse Chiefs; Dana Williams, Pawtucket Red Sox	29
3B	Kevin Ward, Maine Phillies	9
HR	Alan Griffin, Richmond Braves	21
RBI	Ron Jones, Maine Phillies	75
SB	Eric Yelding, Syracuse Chiefs	59

=== Pitching leaders ===
Stat	Player	Total
W	Scott Nielsen, Columbus Clippers; Steve Searcy, Toledo Mud Hens	13
ERA	David West, Tidewater Tides	1.80
CG	Bob Milacki, Rochester Red Wings	11
SV	Joe Boever, Richmond Braves	22
SO	Steve Searcy, Toledo Mud Hens	176
IP	John Mitchell, Tidewater Tides	190.0

== Playoffs ==
- The Rochester Red Wings won their eighth Governors' Cup, defeating the Tidewater Tides in four games.

=== Playoff bracket ===
Governors' Cup
E1	Tidewater	1
W1	Rochester	3

== Awards ==
International League awards
Award name	Recipient
Most Valuable Player	Craig Worthington, Rochester Red Wings
Pitcher of the Year	Steve Searcy, Toledo Mud Hens
Rookie of the Year	Steve Finley, Rochester Red Wings
Manager of the Year	Johnny Oates, Rochester Red Wings

== All-star team ==
International League all-star team
Position	All-star
Catcher	Bob Geren, Columbus Clippers
First base	Alan Griffin, Richmond Braves
Second base	Tom Barrett, Maine Phillies
Shortstop	Randy Velarde, Columbus Clippers
Third base	Craig Worthington, Rochester Red Wings
Outfield	Mark Carreon, Tidewater Tides; Steve Finley, Rochester Red Wings; Carlos Quintana, Pawtucket Red Sox
Designated hitter	Lonnie Smith, Richmond Braves
Starting pitcher	Steve Searcy, Toledo Mud Hens
Relief pitcher	Mark Huismann, Toledo Mud Hens

== See also ==
- 1988 Major League Baseball season
