= Leadoff hitter =

First batter in baseball

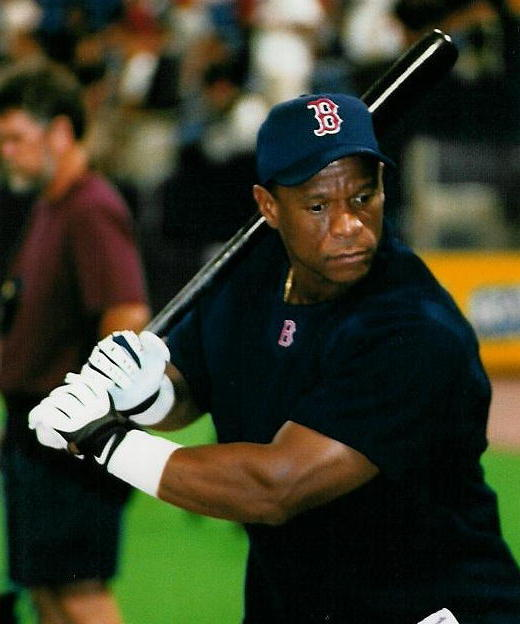
Rickey Henderson, career leader in Major League Baseball for leadoff home runs

In baseball, a leadoff hitter is a batter who bats first in the lineup. It can also refer to any batter who bats first in any inning.

== Strategy ==
Traditionally, the leadoff hitter has been utilized as a contact-oriented position. The leadoff hitter is usually tasked with being able to reach base at a proficient on-base percentage and generate runs for the team. Secondary goals for such a player include wearing down a pitcher's stamina and providing a dangerous presence along the basepaths to create more offensive opportunities. As a result, the prototypical leadoff hitter is small ball oriented, with elements such as contact ability, speed, patience, and occasionally defense elevated to an important level. Power hitters, instead, would be put in the third and fourth slots to drive in the leadoff hitter and produce more runs as a result, thus deemphasizing the necessity for power amongst leadoff hitters. The correlation between leadoff hitters and small ball stretches as far back as 1898 with mentions of a "small, active fellow who can hit, run and steal bases" as being fit for the position. Players such as Rickey Henderson, Ichiro Suzuki, and Kenny Lofton are often considered as archetypal leadoff hitters.

In recent years, however, leadoff hitters are shifting away from the traditional makeup to generally more well-rounded players. Numerous teams have opted to utilize hitters with strong on-base skills and power potential at the top of the batting order in exchange for speed and pure contact ability. Non-typical leadoff hitters such as Kyle Schwarber and George Springer have all seen time in the position in recent years.

== Records ==
Key
*	Member of the Baseball Hall of Fame.

=== Most times on base as leadoff hitter ===
Below is a list of Major League Baseball players with the most times on base from the leadoff spot as of the end of the 2020 season.

Rank	Player	TOB
1	Rickey Henderson *	5,412
2	Pete Rose	4,181
3	Eddie Yost	3,243
4	Brett Butler	3,237
5	Ichiro Suzuki *	3,202

Rank	Player	TOB
6	Lou Brock *	3,080
7	Kenny Lofton	3,018
8	Craig Biggio *	2,777
9	Paul Molitor *	2,732
10	Johnny Damon	2,701

=== Most games played as leadoff hitter ===
Below is a list of Major League Baseball players with the most games played in the leadoff spot as of the end of the 2020 season.

Rank	Player	G
1	Rickey Henderson *	2,886
2	Pete Rose	2,313
3	Lou Brock *	1,901
4	Brett Butler	1,858
5	Ichiro Suzuki *	1,827

Rank	Player	G
6	Eddie Yost	1,741
7	Kenny Lofton	1,711
8	Johnny Damon	1,584
9	Paul Molitor *	1,573
10	Harry Hooper *	1,568

=== Most plate appearances as leadoff hitter ===
Below is a list of Major League Baseball players with the most plate appearances from the leadoff spot as of the end of the 2020 season.

Rank	Player	PA
1	Rickey Henderson *	13,122
2	Pete Rose	10,710
3	Lou Brock *	8,653
4	Ichiro Suzuki *	8,451
5	Brett Butler	8,432

Rank	Player	PA
6	Eddie Yost	8,023
7	Kenny Lofton	7,929
8	Johnny Damon	7,411
9	Craig Biggio *	7,297
10	Paul Molitor *	7,291

== See also ==
- Opening batsmen
