= Field of Hope =

1997 book by Brett Butler

Field of Hope: An Inspiring Autobiography of a Lifetime of Overcoming Odds
- Author: Brett Butler
- Language: English
- Genre: Autobiography
- Publisher: Thomas Nelson Inc.
- Publication date: 1997
- Publication place: United States
- ISBN: 0-7852-7144-9

Field of Hope: An Inspiring Autobiography of a Lifetime of Overcoming Odds is a book by former Major League Baseball All-Star outfielder Brett Butler.
