= Geno Petralli =

American baseball player (born 1959)

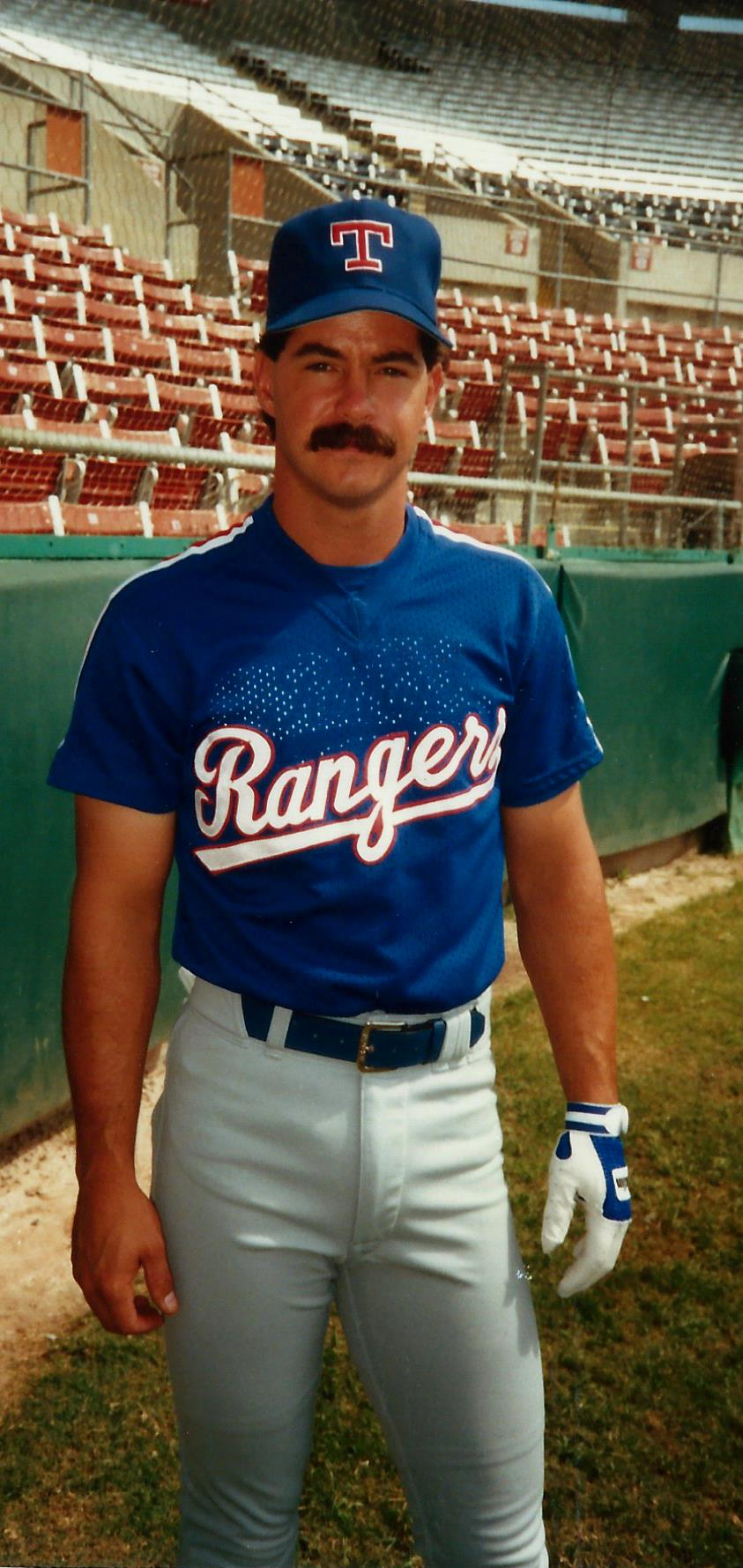
- Petralli as a Texas Ranger
- Catcher
- Born: September 25, 1959 (age 67); Sacramento, California, U.S.
- Batted: Left Threw: Right

MLB debut
- September 4, 1982, for the Toronto Blue Jays

Last MLB appearance
- October 2, 1993, for the Texas Rangers

MLB statistics
- Batting average: .267
- Home runs: 24
- Runs batted in: 192
- Stats at Baseball Reference

Teams
- Toronto Blue Jays (1982–1984); Texas Rangers (1985–1993)

Eugene James Petralli (born September 25, 1959) is an American former professional baseball player. He played as a catcher in Major League Baseball for the Toronto Blue Jays and the Texas Rangers from 1982 to 1993.

== Early life and education ==
Petralli graduated from John F. Kennedy High School in Sacramento, California, and went on to Sacramento City College. He was drafted by the Toronto Blue Jays in the third round (53rd overall pick) of the January regular phase of the 1978 Major League Baseball draft.

== Professional career ==
=== Toronto Blue Jays: 1978–1984 ===
Petralli made his professional debut in 1978 with the Medicine Hat Blue Jays of the rookie Pioneer Baseball League, where he batted .281 in 65 games, playing some third base as well as catching. The following season, he started the year with the class-A Dunedin Blue Jays, batting .288 in 52 games, then was promoted to the Triple-A Syracuse Chiefs, where he batted .232 in 18 games.

In 1980, Petralli was assigned to Double-A with the Knoxville Blue Jays. In his first full season all at one level, he played 116 games and batted .285 with three home runs. Petralli was promoted back to Syracuse in 1981, where he split time with fellow catching prospects, Dan Whitmer and Ramón Lora, and appeared in just 45 games and batted .265.

In 1982, Petralli was given the full-time job at Syracuse, and he responded with minor league career bests in batting average (.289), home runs (9) and runs batted in (58). This earned him a September call-up, and he made his debut on September 4, pinch-hitting for catcher Buck Martinez and striking out. He got his first major league hit the following day, a double off the Cleveland Indians' Len Barker at Cleveland Municipal Stadium. Petralli finished the season with a .364 average in 16 games.

With Ernie Whitt and Martinez still around to handle catching duties for Toronto, and designated hitter Cliff Johnson available for emergencies, Petralli returned to Syracuse in 1983. Although his numbers slipped to a .245 average, three home runs and 40 RBI, he was again called up in September. He received only four at bats over six games and did not record a hit.

In 1984, Petralli made the major league roster out of spring training, but appeared in just three games over the first month of the season, batting three times without a hit. On May 8, his contract was sold to the Cleveland Indians.

=== Cleveland Indians: 1985 ===
Petralli returned to Triple-A for the Indians, assigned to the Maine Guides. There, he served as backup to former New York Yankees prospect Juan Espino, playing in just 23 games and batting .217 without a home run. He started out the next year with Maine as well, this time behind former Rangers prospect Kevin Buckley. After just two games with the Guides in which he had one hit in seven at-bats, Petralli was released on April 23rd.

=== Texas Rangers: 1985–1993 ===
Petralli signed with the Rangers on May 17, and was assigned to the Triple-A Oklahoma City 89ers. In 27 games, he batted .263. In early July, he was called up to the Rangers to replace injured starting catcher Don Slaught.

Petralli made his first appearance for the Rangers on July 9 against the Indians, going 0-for-2. Petralli's first hit as a Ranger came in a 6–0 defeat at Yankee Stadium on July 12 against Yankees pitcher Ed Whitson. With Slaught missing most of the next two months, Petralli split time with Glenn Brummer, but when Slaught returned, he assumed Brummer's role as Slaught's primary backup. Brummer was released after the season. Petralli finished the season with what were, to that point, career highs in most categories, including his first major league stolen base. He batted .270 with 11 RBI in 42 games with the Rangers.

Petralli returned to the Rangers as Slaught's backup in 1986, but the Rangers had also signed Darrell Porter as a free agent to serve as third catcher and part-time DH. When Slaught again was injured in May, the Rangers added a fourth catcher, Orlando Mercado, to the roster, and continued to carry all four for the remainder of the season once Slaught returned.

Petralli's first appearance in the field in 1986 came not as a catcher, but at third base on April 14. He struggled at the plate early in the season, and on June 9 he still had not recorded his first RBI of the year. On June 10, however, he busted out with a five RBI game against the Minnesota Twins, in which he went 3-for-5, including two doubles, to lead the Rangers to a 14–10 win. He also improved his batting average on the season from .200 to .257.

On July 13, Petralli hit his first major league home run against Indians starter and future Hall of Famer Phil Niekro as the Rangers won 5–3. His only other home run of the year was a big one, a game tying two-run pinch-hit home run in the bottom of the eighth inning off Roger Clemens during a nationally televised Monday night baseball game against the first place Boston Red Sox on August 25, 1986, at Arlington Stadium. The blast allowed Rubén Sierra to win the game with a home run in the bottom of the ninth as the Rangers remained within three games of the California Angels in the American League West. The Rangers never got closer to the Angels, however, and were eliminated by being ten games back with nine games to go on September 26. The team ultimately finished in second place, five games back.

Petralli, who served as the Rangers' Union Player Representative in 1986, once again bettered his career highs to date that year. Although his batting average had slipped to .255, he set career highs in games played, at bats, RBI and stolen bases. He also demonstrated his versatility, playing second base for the first time professionally on May 14.

In 1987, the Rangers opened the season with four catchers again. Although Mercado had been traded to the Detroit Tigers, that only opened up room on the roster for prospect Mike Stanley. However, they found playing time for Petralli all over the field, as he appeared at six different positions, including his first-ever professional appearances at first base, left field and right field.

Petralli's most important task, however, was catching knuckleball pitcher Charlie Hough. Handling the difficult pitch put Petralli in the record books three times during the season. The first came on August 22, as Petralli committed four passed balls in one inning to tie the major league record Ray Katt had set while catching knuckleballer Hoyt Wilhelm in 1954. The record was later tied by Ryan Lavarnway of the Boston Red Sox in 2013, catching knuckleballer Steve Wright in his first major league start.

Eight days later, Petralli committed six passed balls in one game to tie another record. Overall, Petralli's 35 passed balls that year—32 with Hough pitching—were the most by a big league catcher since Jack Boyle committed 71 in 1892 (surpassing J. C. Martin's modern-day record of 33 in 1965), and as of 2011 remains the most by a catcher during that time.

Offensively, Petralli continued to improve, as he became the first catcher in Rangers franchise history to bat over .300, posting a .302 average. He played in 101 games with 202 at-bats, seven home runs and 31 RBIs, all career highs to that time.

On November 2, 1987, the Rangers traded Don Slaught to the Yankees for pitcher Brad Arnsberg, and on December 21 they released Porter, leaving Petralli and Stanley as the team's top two catchers for the 1988 season. The two split time fairly evenly until Stanley was injured in July. At that time, the Rangers reacquired Jim Sundberg, who had been released by the Chicago Cubs, to share time with Petralli. Sundberg, who had played ten years for the Rangers from 1974 to 1983, wound up taking over Stanley's half of the duties, while Petralli continued to play all over the infield.

In August, Petralli hit .342 (26 hits in 76 at-bats) over the course of 25 games and was named the Rangers Player of the Month. It was the highest honor he ever received. When Stanley came back, the Rangers continued to carry three catchers, and in September they again added a fourth, bringing prospect Chad Kreuter up from the minors. Kreuter wound up catching 15 of the last 18 games of the season, with Petralli serving as the DH and catching two games.

Overall, Petralli improved on defense while regressing on offense. Although he caught Hough in nine more games in 1988 than he had in 1987, Petralli had only 20 passed balls, which was still enough to lead the majors again. His batting average, while still respectable, especially for a catcher, slipped to .282. He hit seven home runs again, and increased his RBI total to a career high 36, but he did it in 351 at-bats, nearly twice as many as in 1987.

Prior to the 1989 season, Petralli filed for salary arbitration, settling his case with the Rangers on January 20, agreeing to a salary of $325,000. He opened the 1989 season as the Rangers primary starting catcher for the first time, although Stanley, Sundberg and Kreuter remained with the team as well. At the end of May, after the team released Buddy Bell, Petralli was moved to designated hitter, with Kreuter and Sundberg taking over catching duties.

This arrangement didn't last long, as Petralli suffered a left knee injury on June 26. After a brief rehabilitation assignment with the Tulsa Drillers - the first time Petralli had spent in the minors since 1985 - Petralli returned on August 19 and resumed his role as starting catcher. He got his average as high as .324 on September 6, but got just one hit in his next 14 at-bats, and did not play after September 17, finishing the year at .304.

In 1990, Petralli spent his first and last full season as the Rangers starting catcher. Sundberg had retired after the 1989 season, and Stanley was named Petralli's backup while also spending time at DH and first base. Kreuter, who started the year as the third catcher, started the season 0-for-18 and was sent to the minor leagues in mid-May, to be replaced by John Russell.

One of the highlights of Petralli's career came on July 31, 1990, when he caught Nolan Ryan's 300th career win on Ryan's second attempt to reach that milestone. Back in a full-time role for the entire season catching Hough, Petralli led all of Major League Baseball in passed balls for the third time in four years, matching his 1988 total of 20. While he played in a career-high 133 games, his offensive numbers also took a dive, as he batted just .255 and failed to hit a home run for the first time since 1985 while driving in just 21 runs.

Despite his off year, Petralli started 1991 as the Rangers' starter once again, with Stanley again serving as primary backup. Through the end of May, it appeared that Petralli was back in his pre-1990 form, as he batted .275 in 34 games. However, he went into a slump to start June, and soon went on the disabled list with a back injury. To replace him, the Rangers promoted 19-year-old Iván Rodríguez from Tulsa and immediately installed him as their starting catcher, a position he would not relinquish until he left the Rangers as a free agent after the 2002 season.

When Petralli came back at the end of July, he found himself relegated to backup catcher, with occasional duty at DH and as a pinch hitter. He finished the season batting .271 with 2 home runs and 20 RBI in 87 games.

After the 1991 season, Petralli was granted free agency. Despite knowing he would be backing up Rodríguez, he still re-signed with the Rangers on December 7. 1992 was a particularly rough season, as he saw his average slip below the Mendoza Line for the only time in his career at .198 in 94 games. He also saw occasional duty at DH, third base and second base.

In 1993, Petralli's playing time was cut back further, as Rodríguez played in 137 games. In 59 games at catcher, DH, and the infield, Petralli bounced back to hit .241, although that was still the second-lowest average of his career. His final major league game came on Saturday October 2, 1993, in front of over 41,000 fans as the Rangers lost to Tom Gordon and the Kansas City Royals by a score of 7–4. The game was the next to last game ever played at Arlington Stadium before the Rangers moved into their new Ballpark in Arlington the next year.

=== Later career ===
Petralli became a free agent for the second time after the 1993 season. This time the Rangers did not bring him back, opting instead to sign Mike Scioscia as their backup catcher. Petralli signed with the San Diego Padres in March 1994, but did not make their roster and was released.

Shortly afterwards, Petralli caught on with the Chicago Cubs organization, where he became a player-coach for the Orlando Cubs. He injured his ribs in a home plate collision and wound up playing just eight games between Orlando and the Iowa Cubs, ending his playing career.

== Career stats ==
Games	PA	AB	Runs	Hits	2B	3B	HR	RBI	SB	BB	SO	Avg.	Slg.	OBP	Fld%	PB	CS	CS%
809	2131	1874	184	501	83	9	24	192	8	216	263	.267	.360	.344	.984	95	167	32

Petralli led all of baseball in passed balls with 35 in 1987, 20 in 1988, and 20 in 1990. Overall, he ranks 141st as of 2011 in career passed balls despite appearing in just 574 games as a catcher. His best season was 1988, as he amassed 352 at-bats, seven home runs, 36 runs batted in and a .282 average. He hit over .300 in both 1987 & 1989.

== Personal life ==
Petralli is the son of former minor league baseball first baseman Gene Petralli, who played from 1948 to 1953, mostly in the Chicago White Sox organization. Petralli was married on September 22, 1979, to the former Susan Patterson. They have two sons, James Isiah and Ben Petralli, as well as one daughter, Mary Kathryn. James currently sings and plays guitar in the band White Denim.

Ben was drafted five different times. He was first chosen by the Los Angeles Dodgers in 2004, but chose to play at his father's alma mater, Sacramento City College. He was subsequently selected by the Detroit Tigers with their 15th round draft pick in 2005, and their 17th round pick in 2006, then by the Rangers in 2007 and again in 2008. He finally made his professional debut in 2010 with the Grand Prairie AirHogs of the American Association of Independent Professional Baseball, later playing with the Normal CornBelters of the Frontier League.
