= Brett Butler (baseball) =

American baseball player (born 1957)

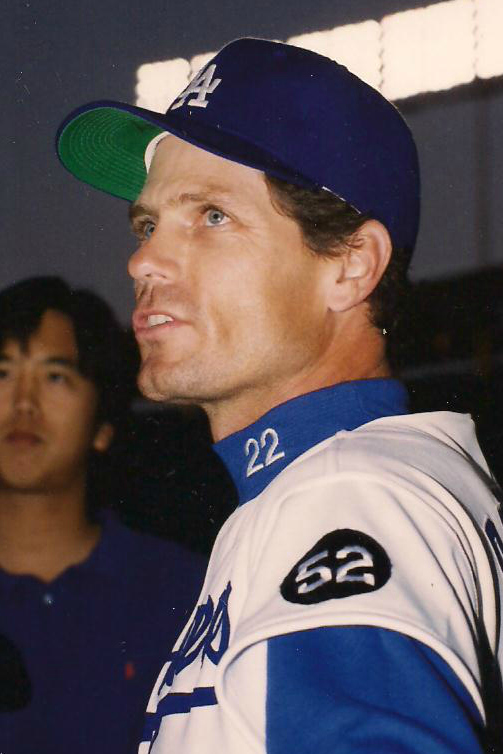
- Butler with the Los Angeles Dodgers in 1993
- Center fielder
- Born: June 15, 1957 (age 69); Los Angeles, California, U.S.
- Batted: Left Threw: Left

MLB debut
- August 20, 1981, for the Atlanta Braves

Last MLB appearance
- September 28, 1997, for the Los Angeles Dodgers

MLB statistics
- Batting average: .290
- Hits: 2,375
- Home runs: 54
- Runs batted in: 578
- Stolen bases: 558
- Stats at Baseball Reference

Teams
- As player: Atlanta Braves (1981–1983); Cleveland Indians (1984–1987); San Francisco Giants (1988–1990); Los Angeles Dodgers (1991–1994); New York Mets (1995); Los Angeles Dodgers (1995–1997); As coach: Arizona Diamondbacks (2005); Miami Marlins (2014–2015)

Career highlights and awards
- All-Star (1991)

Brett Morgan Butler (born June 15, 1957) is an American former center fielder in Major League Baseball and coach. He played for five different teams from 1981 through 1997. A leadoff hitter for the majority of his career, Butler led the league in triples four times, runs scored twice, walks once, and was named a National League All-Star in 1991. He was diagnosed with cancer in May 1996, received treatment and returned to the playing field four months later. He retired in 1997 and began a baseball coaching career. He has coached or managed numerous professional teams. He was the manager of the Reno Aces minor league team from late 2008 through 2013.

== Playing career ==
Butler spent his teenaged years in Libertyville, Illinois, where he was a starting outfielder on the Libertyville High School baseball team that finished in the top 16 teams in the state his senior year. Upon graduating, he announced plans to play baseball in college. Butler, who had explored walking on at baseball powerhouse Arizona State, made the team at Southeastern Oklahoma State University. The outfielder led the Savages to championships during all three years at Southeastern including an NAIA national runner-up finish in 1977. He was twice named to the NAIA All-America Baseball Team. Butler was the Savages' first .400 hitter with a .439 average in 1977. He set career records in home runs (31), runs (209), triples (15), hits (220), walks (162), and career batting average (.394).

After attending Southeastern Oklahoma, Butler was drafted in the 23rd round of the 1979 amateur draft by the Atlanta Braves. The Braves were building a contending team with players like Dale Murphy, Bob Horner, and Glenn Hubbard after years of losing, but they lacked a leadoff hitter with speed. After playing in the minor leagues, he made his major league debut with the Braves on August 20, 1981. Butler helped lead the Braves to a 13–0 start and the National League West Division title in 1982, their first division title since 1969. He had another fine year with the Braves in 1983, but they finished second in the West to the Los Angeles Dodgers.

In October 1983, Butler was sent to the Cleveland Indians (along with Brook Jacoby and Rick Behenna) to complete a deal in which the Braves had acquired Len Barker for cash, toward the end of the 1983 season. In 1984, he became the first batter Roger Clemens would face in the big leagues. He played with the Indians for four seasons, batting a career-high .311 in 1985.

Butler signed with the San Francisco Giants as a free agent after the 1987 season and established himself as one of the premier leadoff hitters in the National League. He helped the Giants to the NL pennant in 1989, as the leadoff hitter in a lineup that included Will Clark, Kevin Mitchell, and Matt Williams. Butler had just four hits in the NLCS versus Chicago but collected six runs. In his first and only World Series appearance, he batted .286 (4-for-14) with one RBI and two stolen bases as the Giants lost in a sweep to the Oakland Athletics.

Following the 1990 season, Butler signed a contract with the Los Angeles Dodgers. As a member of the Dodgers from 1991 to 1995, Butler reached the prime of his career. In 1991, Butler led the National League in runs scored and walks, earned a roster spot on the National League All-Star team, and finished seventh in MVP voting. During the 1995 season, Butler was signed as a free agent by the New York Mets. In August 1995, Butler rejoined the Dodgers in a trade for Dwight Manees and Scott Hunter. After finishing the season with the Dodgers, he again became a free agent and returned to the Dodgers.

In May 1996, Butler learned that he was suffering from squamous cell carcinoma of the tonsils, a type of cancer which only rarely involves the tonsils. Butler was not a smoker himself, but had grown up in a home where both parents smoked heavily, and thus had significant exposure to second-hand smoke for years, which his doctors speculated was the likely cause of his cancer. Following an operation to remove the tumor, and intensive treatment to combat the disease, he returned to the Dodgers' lineup in September of the same year—defying the predictions of those who had speculated he would never be able to play again. Butler finished the 1996 season with the Dodgers and played with them for one more year, participating in his final game on September 28, 1997.

In 1996, he was awarded the Branch Rickey Award, which honored his outstanding community service.

Over his career, Butler produced a .290 batting average, 2,375 hits, and 558 stolen bases. Many consider him to be one of the best leadoff hitters of the 1980s and early 1990s, due to his high on-base percentage, speed and dynamic bunting. However, he also led the league three times in being caught stealing. Butler currently ranks 130th on the list of career hits. He has the most bunt hits of all-time with 245. Butler finished in the top 25 voting for National League Most Valuable Player five times in his career (1988-1992 and 1994); in 1991, he finished seventh in NL MVP voting and was named an all-star. Butler recorded a .993 fielding percentage at center field in his major league career.

== Coaching career ==
Butler began his coaching career in the spring of 1998 as the assistant coach of the Duluth Youth Baseball and Softball Association's Minor League Dodgers team, the team on which his son was playing. He was able to secure and provide replica game and practice uniforms for the boys and coaches. Butler helped coach the Dodgers to a second-place finish in the Minor League championship game that season.

Butler was a coach with the Arizona Diamondbacks for the 2005 season. He was hired to manage the Lancaster JetHawks of the Class-A advanced club for the 2006 season. He was hired to manage the Mobile BayBears, a newly acquired Double-AA team for the Arizona Diamondbacks, for the 2007 season.

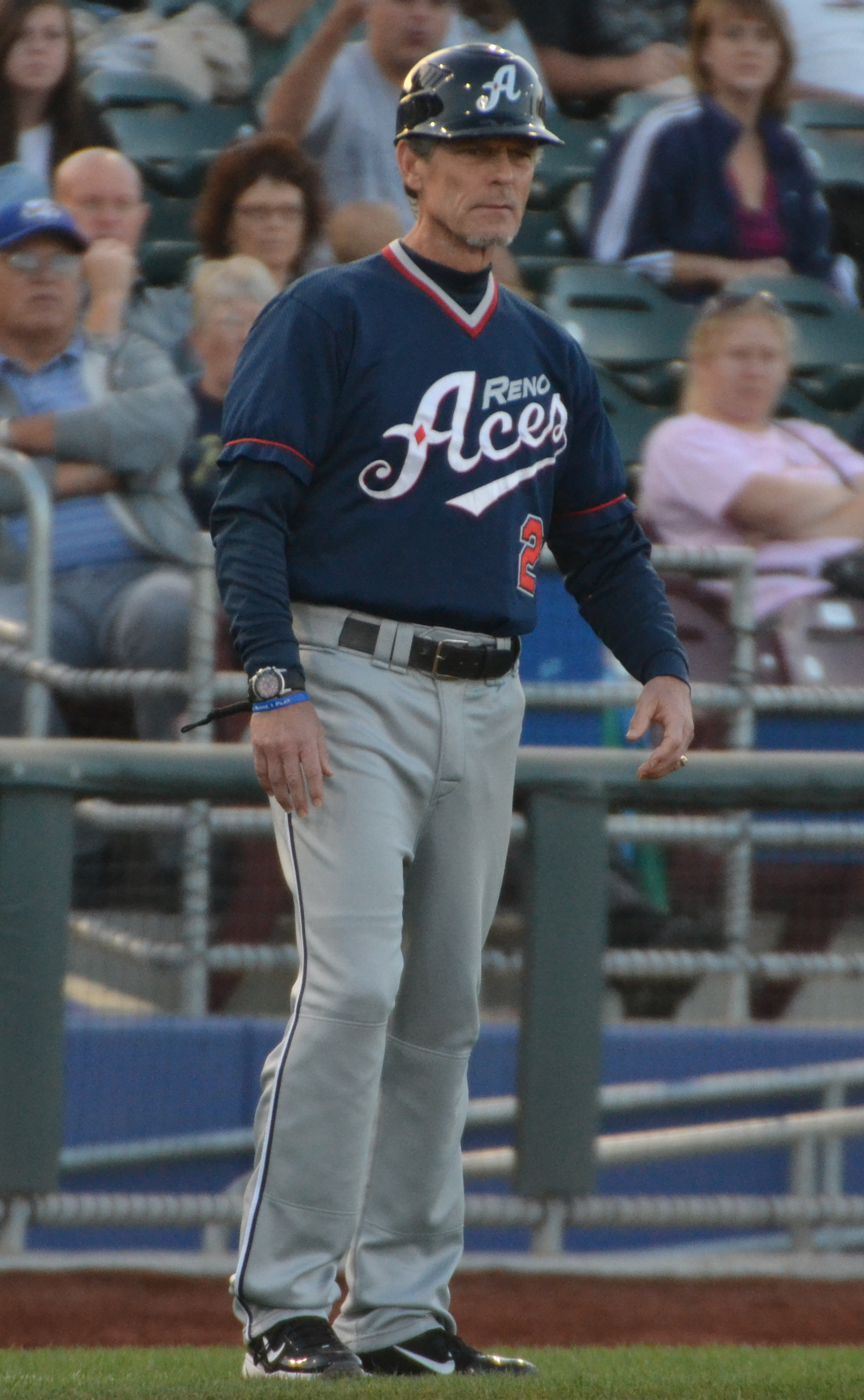
Butler as manager for the Reno Aces in 2012

In October 2008, it was announced that Butler was hired to manage the Reno Aces of the Class-AAA club for the Arizona Diamondbacks. Butler was named as a coach for the 2011 All-Star Futures Game. In 2012, Butler led the Reno Aces to their first ever Pacific Coast League Championship and also led them to the Triple-AAA National Championship in the same year, where they defeated the Pawtucket Red Sox 10-3.

On October 11, 2013, Butler was named the third base/outfield coach for the Miami Marlins. In 2025, Butler became the bunting instructor for the Cincinnati Reds.

== Personal life ==
Butler is a Christian. Butler's wife's name is Eveline, and they have four children, Blake, Abbi, Katie, and Stefanie.

On April 24, 2006, Butler was hospitalized with chest pains after a Lancaster JetHawks game he managed. Butler apparently did not have a heart attack, and underwent further tests. Butler returned to his coaching duties "after a week off due to a viral infection."

On July 29, 2007, Butler was hospitalized again after suffering a mild stroke.

== See also ==
- List of Major League Baseball career hits leaders
- List of Major League Baseball career triples leaders
- List of Major League Baseball career runs scored leaders
- List of Major League Baseball career stolen bases leaders
- List of Major League Baseball annual runs scored leaders
- List of Major League Baseball annual triples leaders
- List of Major League Baseball triples records

== Books ==
- Brett Butler (1997). Field of Hope: An Inspiring Autobiography of a Lifetime of Overcoming Odds. Thomas Nelson Inc. ISBN 0-7852-7144-9.

Awards and achievements
Preceded by Cory Snyder	National League Player of the Month; July, 1992	Succeeded by Gary Sheffield
Sporting positions
Preceded by Tommy Jones	Arizona Diamondbacks first base coach 2005	Succeeded by Lee Tinsley
Preceded by Joey Espada	Miami Marlins third base coach 2014–2015	Succeeded by Lenny Harris
