= Pat Dodson (baseball) =

American baseball player (born 1959)

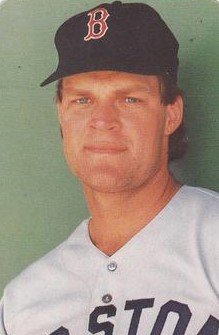
- First baseman
- Born: October 11, 1959 (age 66); Santa Monica, California, U.S.
- Batted: Left Threw: Left

Professional debut
- MLB: September 5, 1986, for the Boston Red Sox
- NPB: April 9, 1989, for the Kintetsu Buffaloes

Last appearance
- MLB: June 22, 1988, for the Boston Red Sox
- NPB: April 15, 1989, for the Kintetsu Buffaloes

MLB statistics
- Batting average: .202
- Home runs: 4
- Runs batted in: 10

NPB statistics
- Batting average: .313
- Home runs: 0
- Runs batted in: 1
- Stats at Baseball Reference

Teams
- Boston Red Sox (1986–1988); Kintetsu Buffaloes (1989)

Patrick Neal Dodson (born October 11, 1959) is an American former professional baseball first baseman. He played in Major League Baseball for the Boston Red Sox from 1986 to 1988. He was drafted in 1980 by the Red Sox in the sixth round, 153rd pick overall out of UCLA. Dodson was a former International League MVP in the minor leagues, but was never able to produce at the major league level. His first major league hit came as a pinch hitter against the Twins on September 6, 1986. His first MLB home run came on September 14, 1986 against Tim Stoddard.

Dodson also played six games for the Kintetsu Buffaloes in 1989, batting .313 with one RBI.

He is currently the Superintendent at Grove Public Schools in Grove, Oklahoma.
