= Ramón Romero (baseball) =

Dominican baseball player (1959–1988)

- Pitcher
- Born: January 8, 1959; San Pedro de Macorís, Dominican Republic
- Died: October 13, 1988 (aged 29); Bronx, New York, U.S.
- Batted: Left Threw: Left

MLB debut
- September 18, 1984, for the Cleveland Indians

Last MLB appearance
- September 21, 1985, for the Cleveland Indians

MLB statistics
- Win–loss record: 2–3
- Earned run average: 6.28
- Strikeouts: 41
- Stats at Baseball Reference

Teams
- Cleveland Indians (1984–1985)

Ramón Romero (January 8, 1959 – October 13, 1988) was a Dominican professional baseball pitcher. He pitched parts of two seasons in Major League Baseball, 1984 and 1985, both for the Cleveland Indians.

Romero died in the Bronx in 1988 while attempting to flee police via his apartment's fire escape. He was under suspicion of selling crack cocaine. His death was not reported in any baseball sources until more than two decades later.

== Sources ==
- Career statistics from MLB · Baseball Reference · Baseball Reference (Minors) · Retrosheet · Baseball Almanac
