= José Román (baseball) =

Dominican baseball player (born 1963)

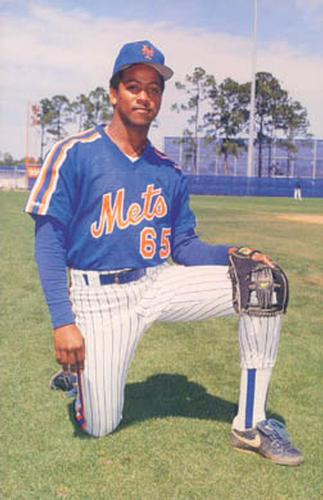
- Pitcher
- Born: May 21, 1963 (age 62); Santo Domingo, Dominican Republic
- Batted: Right Threw: Right

MLB debut
- September 5, 1984, for the Cleveland Indians

Last MLB appearance
- August 27, 1986, for the Cleveland Indians

MLB statistics
- Win–loss record: 1–8
- Earned run average: 8.12
- Strikeouts: 24

CPBL statistics
- Win–loss record: 15–21
- Earned run average: 3.38
- Strikeouts: 199
- Stats at Baseball Reference

Teams
- Cleveland Indians (1984–1986); Brother Elephants (1990–1992)

Career highlights and awards
- Taiwan Series champion (1992)

José Rafael Román Sarita (born May 21, 1963) is a Dominican former Major League Baseball pitcher who played for three seasons.

== Career ==
After spending 1981 to 1983 in the minors, Román pitched for the Cleveland Indians from 1984 to 1986, pitching in 14 career games. He would spend 1987 and 1988 in the minors for the Indians and New York Mets organizations, and played in the Chinese Professional Baseball League for the Brother Elephants from 1990 to 1992.
