= Alex Sanchez (pitcher) =

American baseball player (born 1966)

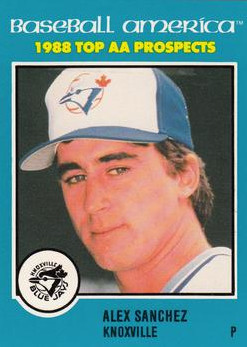
- Sanchez in 1988
- Pitcher
- Born: April 8, 1966 (age 60); Concord, California, U.S.
- Batted: Right Threw: Right

MLB debut
- May 23, 1989, for the Toronto Blue Jays

Last MLB appearance
- June 10, 1989, for the Toronto Blue Jays

MLB statistics
- Win–loss record: 0–1
- Earned run average: 10.03
- Strikeouts: 4
- Stats at Baseball Reference

Teams
- Toronto Blue Jays (1989)

Alex Anthony Sanchez (born April 8, 1966) is an American former professional baseball pitcher. He played in Major League Baseball (MLB) for the Toronto Blue Jays in 1989.

== Early life ==
Sanchez was born in Concord, California and attended Antioch High School. In high school, he was named A-East Bay and All-Northern California for two years. USA Today named Sanchez one of the top 25 pro prospects, and he was drafted by the Chicago Cubs out of high school. Sanchez elected to attend the University of California, Los Angeles (UCLA) instead.

== College career ==
At UCLA, he set a single season all-time record for having 16 wins in one season in 1986. He was named co-Player of the Year in the Pac 10, and first team All-America by Baseball America in 1986. After the 1986 season, he played collegiate summer baseball with the Harwich Mariners of the Cape Cod Baseball League and was named a league all-star.

== Professional career ==
Sanchez was drafted by the Toronto Blue Jays in the 1st round (17th pick overall) of the 1987 Major League Baseball draft. He was named International League Most Valuable Pitcher in 1989 while playing for the Syracuse Chiefs. He played for the Blue Jays for the 1989 season. On September 24, 1990, Sanchez was traded to the Cleveland Indians. He was traded back to the Blue Jays on November 6, 1990.

Sanchez signed with the Kansas City Royals in 1992 and played with their minor league affiliates until 1993. In 1994 and 1995, he played with the minor league affiliates of the San Diego Padres, Seattle Mariners and the Oakland Athletics.

== Awards and honors ==
He was inducted into the Antioch Sports Hall of Fame in 2010.

== Personal ==
Sanchez was high school teammates with Chicago Cubs pitcher Jeff Pico and PGA Tour golfer Larry Silveira.
