= Rick Behenna =

American baseball player (1960–2012)

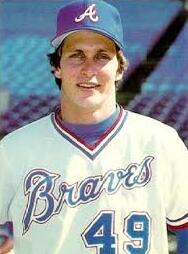
- Pitcher
- Born: March 6, 1960; Miami, Florida, U.S.
- Died: January 31, 2012 (aged 51); Sharpsburg, Georgia, U.S.
- Batted: Right Threw: Right

MLB debut
- April 12, 1983, for the Atlanta Braves

Last MLB appearance
- June 21, 1985, for the Cleveland Indians

MLB statistics
- Win–loss record: 3–10
- Earned run average: 6.12
- Strikeouts: 36
- Stats at Baseball Reference

Teams
- Atlanta Braves (1983); Cleveland Indians (1983–1985)

Richard Kipp Behenna (March 6, 1960 – January 31, 2012) was an American Major League Baseball pitcher for the Atlanta Braves in 1983 and the Cleveland Indians from 1983 to 1985. He was part of what was perhaps one of the worst trades ever made by the Braves. In that deal, the Braves dealt Behenna, third baseman Brook Jacoby, and center fielder Brett Butler to the Indians for their former ace, Len Barker. Barker had a dead arm and was never productive for the Braves.

After the end of his MLB career, Behenna remained active in the game. He served as the pitching coach for the East Coweta High School baseball team. He was also the owner of the Newnan Braves, a baseball team that plays in the Great South League. He died of cancer on January 31, 2012.
