= Brad Havens =

American baseball player (born 1959)

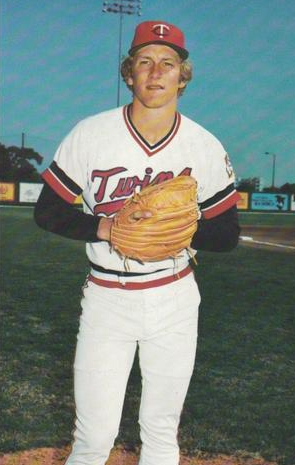
- Havens with the Minnesota Twins c. 1982
- Pitcher
- Born: November 17, 1959 (age 66); Highland Park, Michigan, U.S.
- Batted: Left Threw: Left

MLB debut
- June 5, 1981, for the Minnesota Twins

Last MLB appearance
- July 23, 1989, for the Detroit Tigers

MLB statistics
- Win–loss record: 24–37
- Earned run average: 4.81
- Strikeouts: 370
- Stats at Baseball Reference

Teams
- Minnesota Twins (1981–1983); Baltimore Orioles (1985–1986); Los Angeles Dodgers (1987–1988); Cleveland Indians (1988–1989); Detroit Tigers (1989)

Bradley David Havens (born November 17, 1959) is an American former Major League Baseball pitcher for the Minnesota Twins (1981–83), Baltimore Orioles (1985–86), Los Angeles Dodgers (1987–88), Cleveland Indians (1988–89) and Detroit Tigers (1989).

== Career ==
At Kimball High School, Brad Havens wore No. 26 and played for Coach Frank Clouser at Royal Oak Kimball High School. Havens threw a no-hitter in the 1977 district championship for Kimball, which went to four Class A title games in 10 years from 1971 to 1980. Havens formed a tough one-two left-handed pitching punch with fellow Kimball hurler Steve Manderfield during his years on the varsity at Kimball. Havens was selected in the 8th round by the California Angels and Manderfield was chosen by the Milwaukee Brewers in the 12th round of the 1977 Major League baseball amateur draft.

Havens was later acquired by the Minnesota Twins (along with outfielder Ken Landreaux, catcher/first baseman Dave Engle, and right-handed pitcher Paul Hartzell) in exchange for Rod Carew. He made his major league debut with the Twins at Tiger Stadium, just three weeks before the 1981 players' strike, and finished 9th in voting for 1981 American League Rookie of the Year for having a 3–6 win–loss record, 3.58 earned run average (ERA) and 43 strikeouts in 78 innings pitched. Havens was the opening day starter for the Twins in 1983, at home against the Detroit Tigers, but after posting a 5–8 record with an ERA of 8.18, he never appeared in a Twins uniform again.

Havens was voted a full-share bonus and awarded a player's ring by his fellow former teammates for his limited role (0–0, 4.66 ERA) in the Los Angeles Dodgers' 1988 championship season. Havens joined Kirk Gibson, who graduated from Waterford Kettering High School as two Metro Detroit natives on that World Series team.

In eight years, Havens had a 24–37 win–loss record, 4.81 ERA and 370 strikeouts in 205 games, 61 as a starter. Defensively, Havens handled 86 of 87 total chances successfully for a .989 fielding percentage.
