= Junior Noboa =

Dominican baseball player (born 1964)

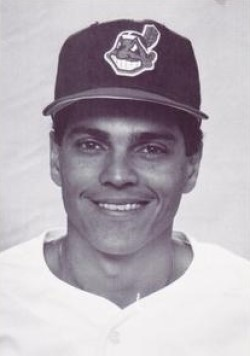
- Second baseman
- Born: November 10, 1964 (age 60); Azua, Dominican Republic
- Batted: Right Threw: Right

MLB debut
- August 22, 1984, for the Cleveland Indians

Last MLB appearance
- August 5, 1994, for the Pittsburgh Pirates

MLB statistics
- Batting average: .239
- Home runs: 1
- Runs batted in: 33
- Stats at Baseball Reference

Teams
- Cleveland Indians (1984, 1987); California Angels (1988); Montreal Expos (1989–1991); New York Mets (1992); Oakland Athletics (1994); Pittsburgh Pirates (1994)

Milciades Arturo "Junior" Noboa Díaz (born November 10, 1964) is a Dominican former professional baseball second baseman. He played in Major League Baseball (MLB) for the Cleveland Indians, California Angels, Montreal Expos, New York Mets, Oakland Athletics, and Pittsburgh Pirates.

Noboa also served as the hitting coach for the Dominican Republic National Team during the 2006, 2009, and 2017 World Baseball Classic.

He currently works in the Arizona Diamondbacks front office as Vice President, Latin Operations. In his current role, Noboa oversees the D-backs' baseball academy in Boca Chica in the Dominican Republic and serves as the team's liaison to its Latin American prospects. Under Noboa's tenure, he has aided in the signing of Miguel Montero, Gerardo Parra, Ender Inciarte, Carlos Gonzalez, and José Valverde. Noboa has also led a first of its kind education program for Latin American players and hosted Ken Kendrick, Derrick Hall, and other members of the Diamondbacks staff in the Dominican Republic for scouting purposes.

He is also the second cousin of Chris Noboa, producer formerly from The Howard Stern Channels and The Scott Ferrall Show on Sirius XM radio.
