= Jeff Moronko =

American baseball player (born 1959)

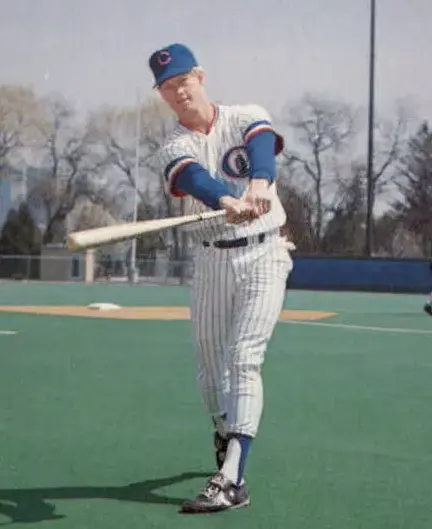
- Moronko with the Columbus Clippers c. 1988
- Third baseman
- Born: August 17, 1959 (age 66); Houston, Texas
- Batted: Right Threw: Right

MLB debut
- September 1, 1984, for the Cleveland Indians

Last MLB appearance
- July 19, 1987, for the New York Yankees

MLB statistics
- Hits: 4
- Batting average: .133
- Runs batted in: 3
- Stats at Baseball Reference

Teams
- Cleveland Indians (1984); New York Yankees (1987)

Jeffrey Robert Moronko (born August 17, 1959) is a former Major League Baseball player. During his major league career, he played for the Cleveland Indians (1984) and the New York Yankees (1987). He was born in Houston, Texas. He attended Texas Wesleyan University and is one of two Major League Baseball players to attend the college, the other being Tris Speaker, Baseball Hall of Famer.

== Career ==
Jeff Moronko was first drafted by the Toronto Blue Jays in the fifth round of the 1979 Major League Baseball draft on January 9, 1979, but did not sign. It wasn't until the Cleveland Indians drafted Moronko in the sixth round of the 1980 Major League Baseball draft on June 3, 1980 that he signed to play with a Major League Baseball organization. After playing in Minor League Baseball for four years, Moronko made his major league debut on September 1, 1984 with the Cleveland Indians. On that day, the Indians were playing the Boston Red Sox at Cleveland Stadium with 7,151 people attending the game. Moronko had his first at-bat at the bottom of the first inning but he struck out. By the time the game ended, Moronko had a total of four at-bats, but did not get any hits. The Indians lost the game by the score of 4–1. On April 29, 1985, Moronko was sent by the Indians to the Texas Rangers for Kevin Buckley to complete an earlier deal made on April 4, 1985. On October 15, 1986, he was granted free agency. On November 20, 1986, he was signed as a free agent with the New York Yankees. Moronko played his final game with the Yankees on July 19, 1987, a 20 to 3 loss to the Texas Rangers.
