= Jim Wilson (first baseman) =

American baseball player (born 1960)

- First baseman
- Born: December 29, 1960 (age 65); Corvallis, Oregon, U.S.
- Batted: Right Threw: Right

Professional debut
- MLB: September 13, 1985, for the Cleveland Indians
- NPB: May 15, 1990, for the Fukuoka Daiei Hawks

Last appearance
- MLB: September 29, 1989, for the Seattle Mariners
- NPB: May 23, 1990, for the Fukuoka Daiei Hawks

MLB statistics
- Batting average: .227
- Home runs: 0
- Runs batted in: 4

NPB statistics
- Batting average: .059
- Home runs: 1
- Runs batted in: 2
- Stats at Baseball Reference

Teams
- Cleveland Indians (1985); Seattle Mariners (1989); Fukuoka Daiei Hawks (1990)

James George Wilson (born December 29, 1960) is an American former professional baseball player. He played parts of two seasons in Major League Baseball, appearing most often defensively as a first baseman, but more often as a designated hitter. He also played one season in Nippon Professional Baseball in Japan.

== Career ==
Wilson attended Oregon State University where he played both baseball and football for the Beavers. In 1982, he set school records in home runs and slugging percentage. He was inducted into the school's athletics hall of fame in 2003.

He was selected by the Cleveland Indians in the 2nd round of the 1982 Major League Baseball draft, and played four games for the Indians in 1985.

He was released by the Indians following the 1986 season. After a brief tour in the Minnesota Twins organization, Wilson signed as a free agent with the Seattle Mariners on March 1, 1988, playing five games for them in the 1989 season.

In 1990, Wilson played in six games for the Fukuoka Daiei Hawks in the Japanese Pacific League. He returned to North America, playing in the minor leagues, Mexican League, and independent leagues until 1994, when he retired.

After his playing days were over, Wilson became a high school and legion coach and sportscaster, based in Vancouver, Washington. He is the color commentator for the Oregon State Beavers football team, working alongside longtime OSU radio voice Mike Parker. He also broadcasts all home OSU baseball games with Parker.
