= Tom Barrett (baseball) =

American baseball player (born 1960)

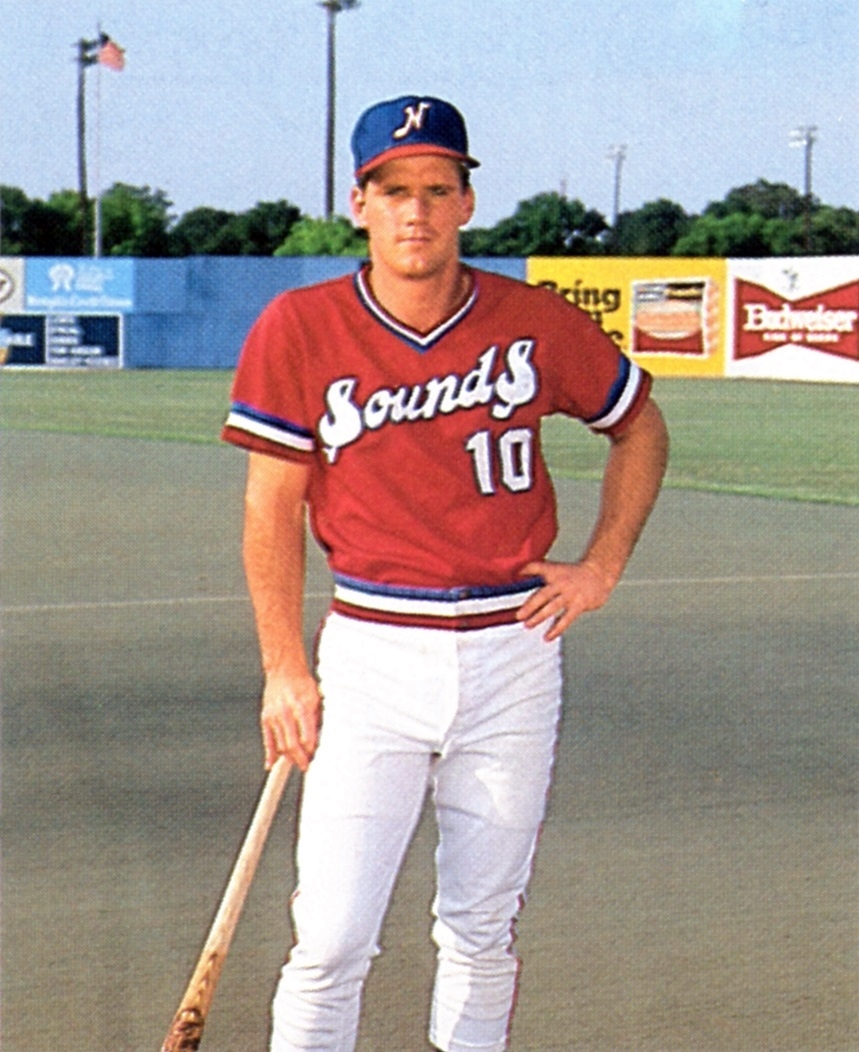
- Barrett with the Nashville Sounds in 1984
- Second baseman
- Born: April 2, 1960 (age 65); San Francisco, California, U.S.
- Batted: Both Threw: Right

MLB debut
- July 2, 1988, for the Philadelphia Phillies

Last MLB appearance
- August 16, 1992, for the Boston Red Sox

MLB statistics
- Batting average: .202
- Home runs: 0
- Runs batted in: 4
- Stats at Baseball Reference

Teams
- Philadelphia Phillies (1988–1989); Boston Red Sox (1992)

Thomas Loren Barrett (born April 2, 1960) is an American former second baseman who played in Major League Baseball (MLB) for the Philadelphia Phillies (1988–1989) and Boston Red Sox (1992). He was a switch-hitter and threw right-handed. In a three-season career, Barrett posted a .202 batting average with nine runs and four RBI in 54 games played.

He was drafted by the New York Yankees in the 26th round of the 1982 MLB draft from the University of Arizona. Barrett was selected to participate in the 1984 Southern League All-Star Game while playing for the Nashville Sounds, the Double-A affiliate of the Yankees. He remained in New York's farm system until being traded to the Philadelphia Phillies on December 11, 1986.

After his playing career, Barrett managed two seasons in the Red Sox organization. He managed the Sarasota Red Sox in 1995 and the Michigan Battle Cats in 1996.

Barrett's older brother, Marty Barrett, played with the Boston Red Sox and San Diego Padres between 1982 and 1991.
