= Otis Nixon =

American baseball player (born 1959)

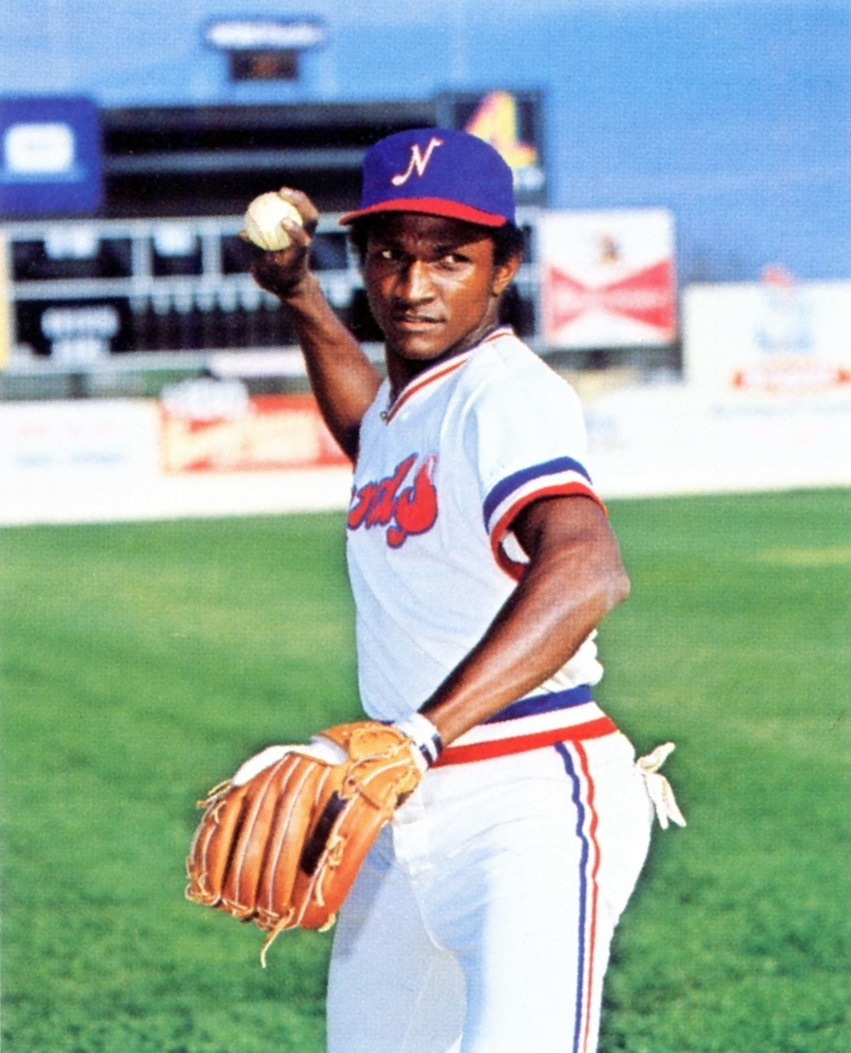
- Nixon with the Nashville Sounds in 1981
- Outfielder
- Born: January 9, 1959 (age 67); Evergreen, North Carolina, U.S.
- Batted: Switch Threw: Right

MLB debut
- June 16, 1983, for the New York Yankees

Last MLB appearance
- October 3, 1999, for the Atlanta Braves

MLB statistics
- Batting average: .270
- Home runs: 11
- Runs batted in: 318
- Stolen bases: 620
- Stats at Baseball Reference

Teams
- New York Yankees (1983); Cleveland Indians (1984–1987); Montreal Expos (1988–1990); Atlanta Braves (1991–1993); Boston Red Sox (1994); Texas Rangers (1995); Toronto Blue Jays (1996–1997); Los Angeles Dodgers (1997); Minnesota Twins (1998); Atlanta Braves (1999)

Otis Junior Nixon (born January 9, 1959) is an American former professional baseball center fielder. He played in Major League Baseball (MLB) for the New York Yankees (1983), Cleveland Indians (1984–87), Montreal Expos (1988–90), Atlanta Braves (1991–93, 1999), Boston Red Sox (1994), Texas Rangers (1995), Toronto Blue Jays (1996–97), Los Angeles Dodgers (1997), Minnesota Twins (1998), and a final return to the Atlanta Braves (1999), in a career that spanned from 1983 to 1999. Nixon stole more bases than any other player during the 1990s (478). He also has the most career stolen bases (620) for a player who never appeared in an MLB All-Star game since it began in 1933.

== Career ==
In the minor leagues, Nixon led the league twice in stolen bases (1980 in the South Atlantic League with 67 & 1983 in the International League with 94), runs scored (1980 in the South Atlantic League with 124 & 1983 in the International League with 129), hits (162 in 1983 in the International League), at bats (557 in 1983 in the International League) and walks (57 in 1979 in the Appalachian League, 113 in 1980 in the South Atlantic League and 110 in 1981 in the Southern League). He started out as an infielder but was switched to outfield in 1983 due to his superior speed and frequency of errors (56 in 127 games in 1981 at shortstop for the Nashville Sounds). In 1982, Nixon stole 107 bases in a combined season between the AA level Nashville Sounds and the AAA level Columbus Clippers.

In 17 seasons Nixon played with the New York Yankees (1983), Cleveland Indians (1984–87), Montreal Expos (1988–90), Atlanta Braves (1991–93. 1999), Boston Red Sox (1994), Texas Rangers (1995), Toronto Blue Jays (1996–97), Los Angeles Dodgers (1997) and Minnesota Twins (1998).

Nixon shares the single game stolen base Major League record with 6 on June 16, 1991. He held the Atlanta Braves single season record for stolen bases with 72 in 1991; the record was broken by Ronald Acuña Jr. in 2023.

On July 25, 1992, Nixon made a catch over the wall to rob Andy Van Slyke of a home run, a catch that was replayed many times on sports news programs. Nixon made the final out of the 1992 World Series attempting to bunt for a base hit with a runner on third and 2 out in extra innings of Game 6. Nixon had successfully bunted for base hits many times for the Braves. On his previous at-bat, Nixon had singled home the tying run (swinging, not bunting) with 2 out in the bottom of the ninth to send Game 6 to extra innings. It was the second World Series in history to end on a bunt. (Lee Lacy of the Dodgers popped out on a bunt attempt to end the 1977 World Series.)

In the 1999 National League Championship Series, 40-year-old Nixon made one of the key plays to save the series for the Braves. After the Braves had blown 5–0 and 7–3 leads in Game 6 and trailed 8–7 in the 8th inning, Nixon, a pinch runner at first base with one out, changed the momentum of the game and the series by stealing second and going to third when the throw went into center field. Nixon went on to score the tying run, and the Braves eventually won the game and series in extra innings.

In his career, Nixon batted .270 with 11 home runs, 318 RBI, 878 runs, 1,379 hits, 142 doubles, 27 triples, and 620 stolen bases in 1,709 games. In his postseason career, Nixon hit .321 with a .396 on-base percentage, 13 runs and 11 stolen bases in 24 games. In eight career World Series games, Nixon hit .310 with five stolen bases.

== Personal life ==
Nixon's younger brother, Donell Nixon, is also a former Major League Baseball player, playing from 1987 until 1990.

Nixon battled a cocaine habit for much of his career. He was arrested on drug charges in 1987 while a member of the Cleveland Indians organization. Nixon failed a drug test in September 1991 and was suspended for 60 days, which caused him to miss the 1991 World Series.

In 2000, he married former R&B singer Perri Reid. They divorced in 2004.

In an interview on February 11, 2010, on Hardcore Sports Radio on SiriusXM, Nixon discussed how he overcame his demons and conquered his drug and alcohol addiction.

Nixon married gospel artist Candi Staton in 2010. They divorced in 2012.

Nixon was arrested May 4, 2013, in Cherokee County, Georgia, after a crack rock and pipe were found in his vehicle during a traffic stop.

On April 9, 2017, Nixon was reported missing by the Woodstock Police Department in Woodstock, Georgia. He left his house that morning to go to a local golf course for a scheduled tee time, but did not arrive. On April 10, 2017, he was found safe by Woodstock Police.

== See also ==
- List of Major League Baseball stolen base records
- List of Major League Baseball career stolen bases leaders
