= Brad Arnsberg =

American baseball player (born 1963)

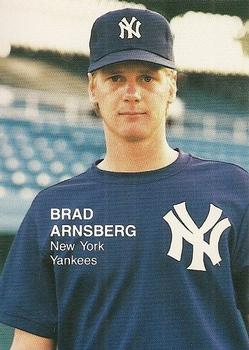
- Pitcher
- Born: August 20, 1963 (age 63); Seattle, Washington, U.S.
- Batted: Right Threw: Right

MLB debut
- September 6, 1986, for the New York Yankees

Last MLB appearance
- April 23, 1992, for the Cleveland Indians

MLB statistics
- Win–loss record: 9–6
- Earned run average: 4.26
- Strikeouts: 100
- Stats at Baseball Reference

Teams
- As player: New York Yankees (1986–1987); Texas Rangers (1989–1991); Cleveland Indians (1992); As coach: Montreal Expos (2000–2001); Florida Marlins (2002–2003); Toronto Blue Jays (2005–2009); Houston Astros (2010–2011)

Bradley James Arnsberg (born August 20, 1963) is an American Major League Baseball coach and a former pitcher. He has held the role of pitching coach for the Montreal Expos, Florida Marlins, Toronto Blue Jays, and Houston Astros, and is currently with the Arizona Diamondbacks.

== Playing career ==
Arnsberg graduated from high school in Medford, Oregon, and was drafted in the first round of the 1983 draft (ninth overall) out of Merced College. During his playing career, he played for the New York Yankees, Texas Rangers, and the Cleveland Indians. He made his debut on September 6, 1986, at the age of 23. While pitching for the Rangers, he earned the save for Nolan Ryan's 300th career win against the Milwaukee Brewers in Milwaukee on July 31, 1990 (when the Brewers played in the American League). He played the last game of his Major League career on April 23, 1992, and spent the next two seasons on various minor league teams before retiring.

== Coaching career ==
Arnsberg served as pitching coach for the Montreal Expos from 2000 to 2001 and the Florida Marlins in 2002 and 2003, but was fired along with manager Jeff Torborg in May 2003. After a year in AAA in 2004 with the Syracuse SkyChiefs, he served as the Toronto Blue Jays pitching coach from 2005 to 2009. In 2010, he was hired by the Houston Astros to serve as their pitching coach. He was fired on June 14, 2011. In 2013, Arnsberg was hired by the Arizona Diamondbacks as their rehab coordinator.

== Personal life ==
Arnsberg resides in Cave Creek, Arizona, with his wife, Shelley. They have two children.
