= Brook Jacoby =

American baseball player (born 1959)

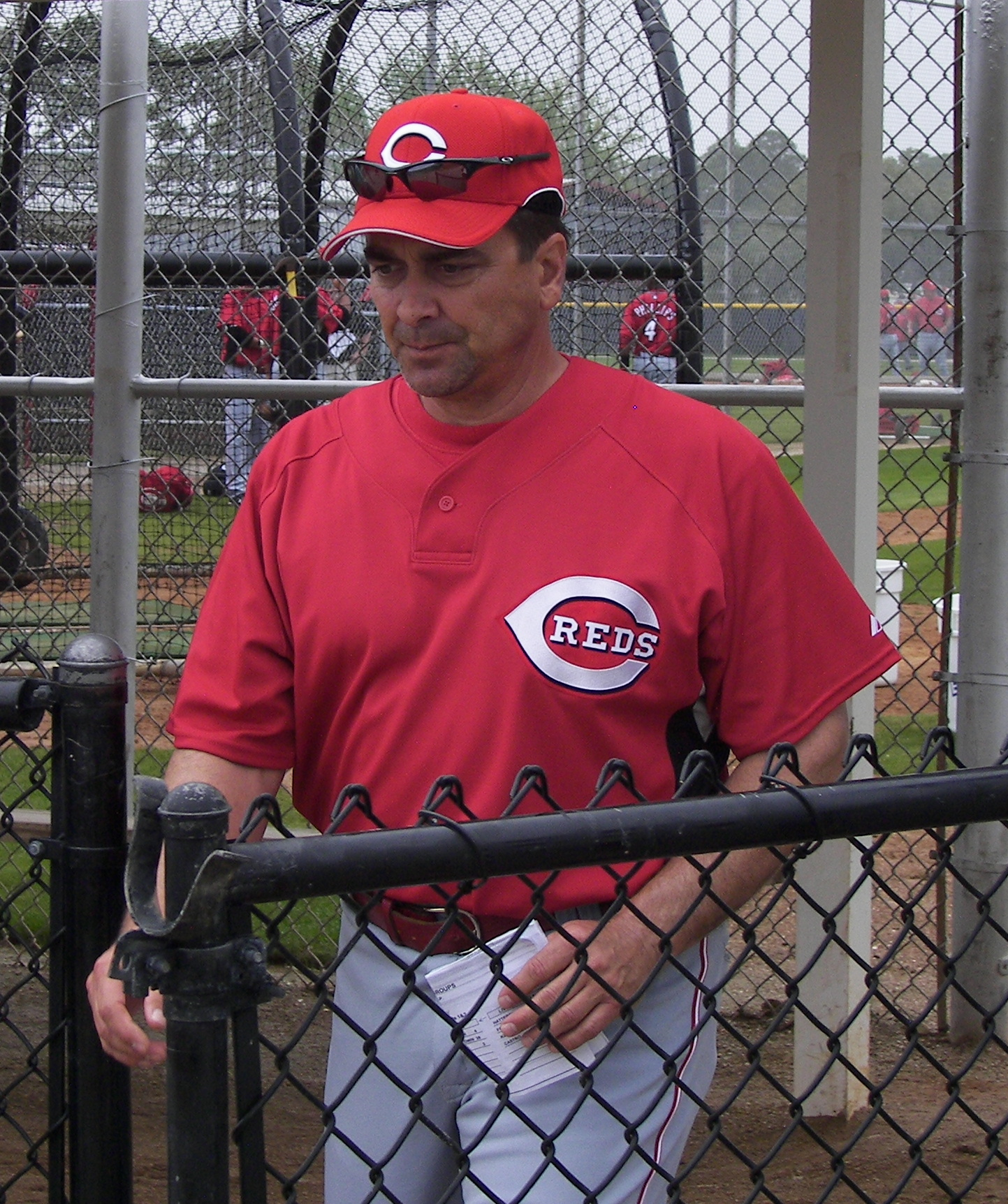
- Jacoby with the Cincinnati Reds
- Third baseman
- Born: November 23, 1959 (age 66); Philadelphia, Pennsylvania, U.S.
- Batted: Right Threw: Right

Professional debut
- MLB: September 13, 1981, for the Atlanta Braves
- NPB: April 10, 1993, for the Chunichi Dragons

Last appearance
- MLB: October 4, 1992, for the Cleveland Indians
- NPB: May 4, 1993, for the Chunichi Dragons

MLB statistics
- Batting average: .270
- Home runs: 120
- Runs batted in: 545

NPB statistics
- Batting average: .183
- Home runs: 2
- Runs batted in: 6
- Stats at Baseball Reference

Teams
- Atlanta Braves (1981, 1983); Cleveland Indians (1984–1991); Oakland Athletics (1991); Cleveland Indians (1992); Chunichi Dragons (1993)

Career highlights and awards
- 2× All-Star (1986, 1990)

Brook Wallace Jacoby (born November 23, 1959) is an American former third baseman. He played in the major leagues from 1981 through 1992, and in Japan in 1993. His father, Brook Wallace Jacoby Sr., played in the Philadelphia Phillies organization in 1956.

== Early career ==
Jacoby was drafted by the Atlanta Braves in the 7th round of the 1979 amateur draft. He played in the Braves' minor league system for five years, until being traded to the Cleveland Indians in 1983 along with Brett Butler and Rick Behenna for Cleveland pitcher Len Barker.

== Major league career ==
Jacoby had limited playing time in Atlanta in 1981 and 1983, only for a total of 15 games played. 1984 was his first full major league season; he finished the year with a .264 batting average, 116 hits, and seven home runs. All his statistics would improve in 1985; batting average to .274, 166 hits, 20 home runs, and a career high 87 RBI.

1986 was a landmark year for Jacoby. While his statistics only improved slightly over 1985 (his average went up to .288 and 168 hits, with fewer home runs and RBI - and more strike outs), he earned his first All-Star Game appearance.

In 1987, Jacoby set career highs with a .300 batting average and 32 home runs. In addition, he lowered his number of strikeouts to only 73. Jacoby's best season was one of only a few bright spots for a Cleveland team that finished with a record of 61–101. The team had such a hard time scoring runs that Jacoby had only 69 RBI, despite his 32 home runs.

Jacoby went into a slump in 1988, where he hit .241 and his offensive production on all levels decreased. 1989 would show a small improvement over the prior year, as he raised his average to .272 and increased his offensive production. Jacoby once again showed improvement in 1990, as his average was .293 and also had his lowest number of strikeouts (58) and earned his second All-Star appearance.

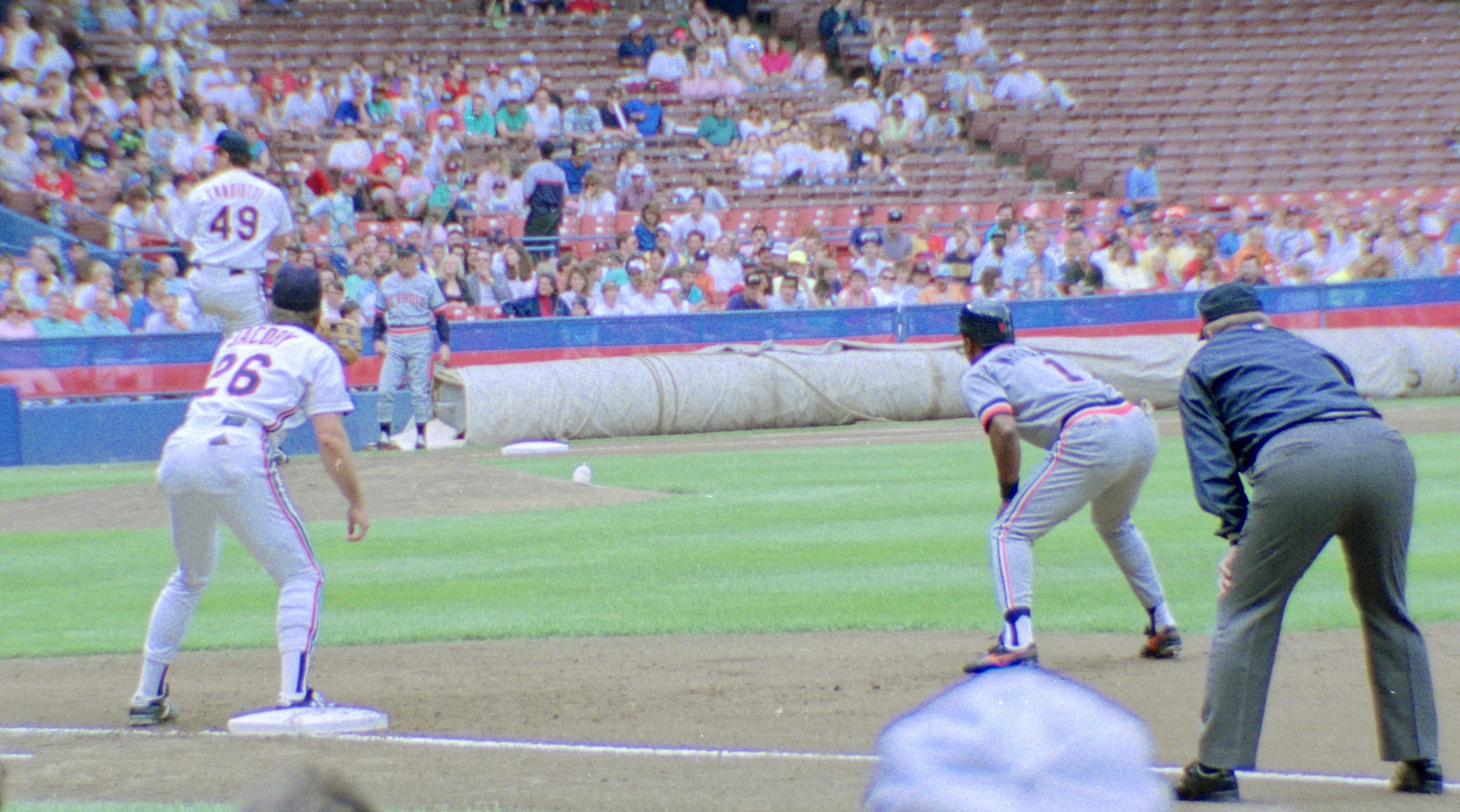
Jacoby (left) holding Lou Whitaker on at first base during a game on June 2, 1991 at Cleveland Stadium

1991 would turn out to be Jacoby's last full season. He suffered from an elbow injury, and in the middle of the year was traded to the Oakland Athletics for Lee Tinsley. In total, he hit .224 with only 94 hits and four home runs.

It was not long before Jacoby came back to Cleveland. He became a free agent after 1991, and signed with the Indians in 1992. Although he was signed to back-up starting third baseman Jim Thome, Thome broke his wrist and Jacoby took over the starting job. Sinking to career lows in hits, home runs, and RBIs, he was let go by the Indians at the end of the season.

== Coaching career ==
Jacoby was announced as the hitting coach for the Toronto Blue Jays on November 17, 2014. Prior to working with the Jays, Jacoby served as the major league hitting coach for the Cincinnati Reds for seven seasons. On May 4, 2015, MLB announced that Jacoby had been suspended for 14 days without pay due to his conduct toward the umpiring crew on April 29, after a game against the Boston Red Sox. The Blue Jays appealed the suspension. Jacoby was fired by the Blue Jays on November 3, 2018.
