= Maine Guides =

- 1984–1988; Old Orchard Beach, Maine
Team logo
Cap insignia

Minor league affiliations
- Class: Triple-A (1984–1988)
- League: International League (1984–1988)
- Division: East Division

Major league affiliations
- Team: Philadelphia Phillies (1987–1988); Cleveland Indians (1984–1986)

Minor league titles
- League titles: None

Team data
- Name: Maine Phillies (1988); Maine Guides (1984–1987)
- Colors: Navy, blue, white
- Ballpark: The Ballpark (1984–1988)

The Maine Guides were an American minor league baseball franchise that played in Old Orchard Beach, Maine, between 1984 and 1988. The Triple-A International League (IL) club was named for a classification of registered hunting and wilderness guides in the state called Maine Guides for its first four seasons, but changed to the Maine Phillies for its final campaign.

== History ==
In December 1982, Jordan Kobritz purchased the Charleston Charlies from Carl Steinfelt. The Charlies played in Charleston, West Virginia, in 1983 and Kobritz moved them to Maine ahead of the 1984 season. Sportscaster Gary Thorne was a co-owner of the team. Although Old Orchard Beach is not one of Maine's year-round population centers, it is a popular summer vacation destination. Kobritz oversaw the construction of a stadium, called The Ball Park, on the outskirts of town. Fans who visited the stadium complained of rampant mosquitos, and the team struggled at the turnstiles almost from the outset.

The Guides, top farm team of the Cleveland Indians at the time, drew 183,300 fans in their maiden season—fourth overall in the International League. They finished second in the standings and the runners-up in the IL playoffs. The Guides again placed second in 1985, but fell to 136,000 in total attendance—last in the eight-team league. The 1986 Guides placed last in the league, and last at the gate (105,600).

In 1987, the Indians departed and the club became an affiliate of the Philadelphia Phillies. In October 1987, John McGee won the franchise through a ruling of a three-judge panel of the 1st U.S. Circuit Court of Appeals. McGee made known his intention to move the club to a new ballpark in Lackawanna County, Pennsylvania. However the ballpark would not be ready until 1989. McGee chose to remain in Old Orchard Beach for the 1988 season and renamed the team the Phillies. The Guides' attendance had held steady in 1987, but hemorrhaged fans—almost a quarter of its dismal 1987 total—drawing only 80,000 people in 1988 while finishing last in their division. The franchise relocated to Pennsylvania for the 1989 season and was renamed the Scranton/Wilkes-Barre Red Barons, who are now the Scranton/Wilkes-Barre RailRiders.

The state of Maine has had the Portland Sea Dogs of the Double-A Eastern League in the city of Portland since 1994.

== Notable alumni ==
- Darren Daulton
- Steve Farr
- John Farrell
- Dave Gallagher
- Chris James
- Ricky Jordan
- Mike Maddux
- Otis Nixon
- Junior Noboa
- Geno Petralli
- Roy Smith
- Cory Snyder
- Jeff Stone
