= 1950 Brooklyn Dodgers season =

Major League Baseball season

1950 Brooklyn Dodgers
- League: National League
- Ballpark: Ebbets Field
- City: Brooklyn, New York
- Record: 89–65 (.578)
- League place: 2nd
- Owners: James & Dearie Mulvey, Walter O'Malley, Branch Rickey, John L. Smith
- President: Branch Rickey
- General managers: Branch Rickey
- Managers: Burt Shotton
- Television: WOR-TV
- Radio: WMGM; Red Barber, Connie Desmond, Vin Scully

The 1950 Brooklyn Dodgers struggled for much of the season, but still wound up pushing the Philadelphia Phillies to the last day of the season before falling two games short. Following the season, Branch Rickey was replaced as majority owner/team president by Walter O'Malley, who promptly fired manager Burt Shotton and replaced him with Chuck Dressen. Buzzie Bavasi was also hired as the team's first independent General Manager.

Vin Scully joined the Dodgers' radio and television crew as a play-by-play announcer in 1950; in 2016, Scully entered his 67th consecutive season with the club, the longest such tenure in the history of sports broadcasting; that season was the first wherein his voice, as well as of Red Barber's, was broadcast on television station WOR-TV, making the Dodgers the last New York City MLB team to introduce regular television broadcasts, 11 years following the first broadcasts of 1939.

== Offseason ==
- October 1, 1949: Danny O'Connell was traded by the Dodgers to the Pittsburgh Pirates for a player to be named later and cash. The Pirates completed the deal by sending Jack Cassini to the Dodgers on October 11.
- October 4, 1949: Sam Jethroe and Bob Addis were traded by the Dodgers to the Boston Braves for Don Thompson, Dee Phillips and Al Epperly.
- October 14, 1949: Marv Rackley was purchased from the Dodgers by the Cincinnati Reds.
- October 14, 1949: Paul Minner and Preston Ward were purchased from the Dodgers by the Chicago Cubs.
- November 4, 1949: Hank Schenz was purchased from the Dodgers by the Pittsburgh Pirates.
- November 14, 1949: Dick Whitman was purchased from the Dodgers by the Philadelphia Phillies.
- December 24, 1949: Luis Olmo was traded by the Dodgers to the Boston Braves for Jim Russell, Ed Sauer and cash.
- April 10, 1950: Nero Wolfe trains with the Dodgers as shortstop, but fails to make the roster.
- Prior to 1950 season (exact date unknown)
  - John Glenn was signed as an amateur free agent by the Dodgers.
  - Glenn Cox was signed as an amateur free agent by the Dodgers.

== Regular season ==
During the season, Duke Snider had a hitting streak of 22 games Another highlight was on August 31, when Gil Hodges hit four home runs in one game, becoming the first player in the 20th century to do so in his home park.

=== Season standings ===
National League
Team	W	L	Pct.	GB	Home	Road
Philadelphia Phillies	91	63	.591	—	48‍–‍29	43‍–‍34
Brooklyn Dodgers	89	65	.578	2	48‍–‍30	41‍–‍35
New York Giants	86	68	.558	5	44‍–‍32	42‍–‍36
Boston Braves	83	71	.539	8	46‍–‍31	37‍–‍40
St. Louis Cardinals	78	75	.510	12½	48‍–‍28	30‍–‍47
Cincinnati Reds	66	87	.431	24½	38‍–‍38	28‍–‍49
Chicago Cubs	64	89	.418	26½	35‍–‍42	29‍–‍47
Pittsburgh Pirates	57	96	.373	33½	33‍–‍44	24‍–‍52

=== Record vs. opponents ===
1950 National League record Sources:
Team	BSN	BRO	CHC	CIN	NYG	PHI	PIT	STL
Boston	—	9–13	9–13	17–5	13–9	9–13–1	15–7–1	11–11
Brooklyn	13–9	—	10–12	12–10	12–10	11–11–1	19–3	12–10
Chicago	13–9	12–10	—	4–17	5–17	9–13–1	11–11	10–12
Cincinnati	5–17	10–12	17–4	—	11–11	4–18	12–10	7–15
New York	9–13	10–12	17–5	11–11	—	12–10	16–6	11–11
Philadelphia	13–9–1	11–11–1	13–9–1	18–4	10–12	—	14–8	12–10
Pittsburgh	7–15–1	3–19	11–11	10–12	6–16	8–14	—	12–9
St. Louis	11–11	10–12	12–10	15–7	11–11	10–12	9–12	—

=== Notable transactions ===
- May 10, 1950: Willie Ramsdell was purchased from the Dodgers by the Cincinnati Reds.
- May 17, 1950: Spider Jorgensen was purchased from the Dodgers by the New York Giants.
- July 30, 1950: Glen Moulder was traded by the Dodgers to the St. Louis Cardinals for Johnny Lindell.
- September 10, 1950: Harry Taylor was purchased from the Dodgers by the Boston Red Sox.

=== Opening Day lineup ===
Opening Day Lineup
#	Name	Position
1	Pee Wee Reese	SS
8	George Shuba	LF
4	Duke Snider	CF
42	Jackie Robinson	2B
6	Carl Furillo	RF
14	Gil Hodges	1B
2	Bobby Morgan	3B
39	Roy Campanella	C
36	Don Newcombe	P

=== Roster ===
1950 Brooklyn Dodgers
Roster
Pitchers: 43 Dan Bankhead; 11 Jack Banta; 26 Rex Barney; 13 Ralph Branca; 11 Al Epperly; 17,11 Carl Erskine; 19 Joe Hatten; 41 Clem Labine; 11 Joe Landrum; 38 Billy Loes; 35 Mal Mallette; 23 Pat McGlothin; 36 Don Newcombe; 12 Erv Palica; 40 Bud Podbielan; 33 Willie Ramsdell; 28 Preacher Roe; 33 Jim Romano; 25 Chris Van Cuyk	Catchers: 39 Roy Campanella; 10 Bruce Edwards; 7 Steve Lembo; Infielders: 18 Wayne Belardi; 3 Billy Cox; 14 Gil Hodges; 21 Spider Jorgensen; 34 Eddie Miksis; 2 Bobby Morgan; 1 Pee Wee Reese; 42 Jackie Robinson	Outfielders: 8,32 Cal Abrams; 5 Tommy Brown; 6 Carl Furillo; 22 Gene Hermanski; 37 Jim Russell; 8 George Shuba; 4 Duke Snider	Manager: -- Burt Shotton; Coaches: 44 Sam Narron; 31 Jake Pitler; 27 Milt Stock; 15 Clyde Sukeforth

== Player stats ==
=== Batting ===
==== Starters by position ====
Note: Pos = Position; G = Games played; AB = At bats; H = Hits; Avg. = Batting average; HR = Home runs; RBI = Runs batted in

Pos	Player	G	AB	H	Avg.	HR	RBI
C	Roy Campanella	126	437	123	.281	31	89
1B	Gil Hodges	153	561	159	.283	32	113
2B	Jackie Robinson	144	518	170	.328	14	81
SS	Pee Wee Reese	141	531	138	.260	11	52
3B	Billy Cox	119	451	116	.257	8	44
OF	Duke Snider	152	620	199	.321	31	107
OF	Gene Hermanski	94	289	86	.298	7	34
OF	Carl Furillo	153	620	189	.305	18	106

==== Other batters ====
Note: G = Games played; AB = At bats; H = Hits; Avg. = Batting average; HR = Home runs; RBI = Runs batted in

Player	G	AB	H	Avg.	HR	RBI
Jim Russell	77	214	49	.229	10	32
Bobby Morgan	67	199	45	.226	7	21
Bruce Edwards	50	142	26	.183	8	16
George Shuba	34	111	23	.207	3	12
Tommy Brown	48	86	25	.291	8	20
Eddie Miksis	51	76	19	.250	2	10
Cal Abrams	38	44	9	.205	0	4
Wayne Belardi	10	6	1	.167	0	0
Steve Lembo	5	6	1	.167	0	0
Spider Jorgensen	2	2	0	.000	0	1

=== Pitching ===
==== Starting pitchers ====
Note: G = Games pitched; IP = Innings pitched; W = Wins; L = Losses; ERA = Earned run average; SO = Strikeouts

Player	G	IP	W	L	ERA	SO
Don Newcombe	40	267.1	19	11	3.70	130
Preacher Roe	36	250.2	19	11	3.30	125
Carl Erskine	22	103.0	7	6	4.72	50

==== Other pitchers ====
Note: G = Games pitched; IP = Innings pitched; W = Wins; L = Losses; ERA = Earned run average; SO = Strikeouts

Player	G	IP	W	L	ERA	SO
Erv Palica	43	201.1	13	8	3.58	131
Ralph Branca	43	142.0	7	9	4.69	100
Dan Bankhead	41	129.1	9	4	5.50	96
Bud Podbielan	20	72.2	5	4	5.33	28
Joe Hatten	23	68.2	2	2	4.59	29
Jack Banta	16	41.1	4	4	4.35	15
Chris Van Cuyk	12	33.1	1	3	4.86	21
Jim Romano	3	6.1	0	0	5.68	8

==== Relief pitchers ====
Note: G = Games pitched; W = Wins; L = Losses; SV = Saves; ERA = Earned run average; SO = Strikeouts

Player	G	W	L	SV	ERA	SO
Rex Barney	20	2	1	0	6.42	23
Billy Loes	10	0	0	0	7.82	2
Joe Landrum	7	0	0	1	8.10	5
Al Epperly	5	0	0	0	5.00	3
Willie Ramsdell	5	1	2	1	2.84	2
Mal Mallette	2	0	0	0	0.00	2
Clem Labine	1	0	0	0	4.50	0
Pat McGlothin	1	0	0	0	13.50	2

== Awards and honors ==
- 1950 Major League Baseball All-Star Game
  - Roy Campanella starter
  - Jackie Robinson starter
  - Gil Hodges reserve
  - Don Newcombe reserve
  - Pee Wee Reese reserve
  - Preacher Roe reserve
  - Duke Snider reserve
- TSN Major League All-Star Team
  - Jackie Robinson

== Farm system ==
Level	Team	League	Manager
AAA	Hollywood Stars	Pacific Coast League	Fred Haney
AAA	Montreal Royals	International League	Walter Alston
AAA	St. Paul Saints	American Association	Clay Hopper
AA	Ft. Worth Cats	Texas League	Bobby Bragan
AA	Mobile Bears	Southern Association	Paul Chervinko
A	Elmira Pioneers	Eastern League	Greg Mulleavy; George Fallon
A	Greenville Spinners	South Atlantic League	Oscar Grimes
A	Pueblo Dodgers	Western League	Ray Hathaway
B	Asheville Tourists	Tri-State League	Clay Bryant
B	Danville Dodgers	Illinois–Indiana–Iowa League	James Bivin
B	Lancaster Red Roses	Interstate League	Ed Head
B	Miami Sun Sox	Florida International League	Pepper Martin
B	Newport News Dodgers	Piedmont League	Al Campanis; Bud Metheny
C	Billings Mustangs	Pioneer League	Larry Shepard
C	Bisbee-Douglas Copper Kings	Southwest International League	Buck Elliott
C	Greenwood Dodgers	Cotton States League	Lou Rochelli
C	Santa Barbara Dodgers	California League	Bill Hart
D	Trois-Rivières Royals	Canadian–American League	George Scherger
D	Hazard Bombers	Mountain States League	Max Macon
D	Hornell Dodgers	Pennsylvania–Ontario–New York League	Doc Alexson
D	Ponca City Dodgers	Kansas–Oklahoma–Missouri League	Boyd Bartley
D	Sheboygan Indians	Wisconsin State League	Joe Hauser
D	Valdosta Dodgers	Georgia–Florida League	Stan Wasiak

LEAGUE CHAMPIONS: Billings
