= 1951 International League season =

- League: International League
- Sport: Baseball
- Duration: April 18 – September 21
- Games: 154
- Teams: 8

Regular season
- Season MVP: Archie Wilson, Buffalo Bisons

Governors' Cup Playoffs
- League champions: Montreal Royals
- Runners-up: Syracuse Chiefs

IL seasons
- ← 1950 1952 →

The 1951 International League was a Class AAA baseball season played between April 18 and September 21. Eight teams played a 154-game schedule, with the top four teams qualifying for the post-season.

The Montreal Royals won the Governors' Cup, defeating the Syracuse Chiefs in the final round of the playoffs.

== Team changes ==
- The Jersey City Giants relocated to Ottawa, Ontario and became the Ottawa Giants and would remain affiliated with the New York Giants.
- The Baltimore Orioles ended their affiliation with the St. Louis Browns and began an affiliation with the Philadelphia Phillies.
- The Toronto Maple Leafs ended their affiliation with the Philadelphia Phillies and began an affiliation with the St. Louis Browns.
- The Buffalo Bisons ended their affiliation with the Philadelphia Athletics.
- The Syracuse Chiefs ended their affiliation with the Cincinnati Reds.

== Teams ==
1951 International League
Team	City	MLB Affiliate	Stadium
Baltimore Orioles	Baltimore, Maryland	Philadelphia Phillies	Municipal Stadium
Buffalo Bisons	Buffalo, New York	None	Offermann Stadium
Montreal Royals	Montreal, Quebec	Brooklyn Dodgers	Delorimier Stadium
Ottawa Giants	Ottawa, Ontario	New York Giants	Lansdowne Park
Rochester Red Wings	Rochester, New York	St. Louis Cardinals	Red Wing Stadium
Springfield Cubs	Springfield, Massachusetts	Chicago Cubs	Pynchon Park
Syracuse Chiefs	Syracuse, New York	None	MacArthur Stadium
Toronto Maple Leafs	Toronto, Ontario	St. Louis Browns	Maple Leaf Stadium

== Map of teams ==
International League teams

== Regular season ==
=== Summary ===
- The Montreal Royals finished with the best record in the regular season for the first time since 1948.

=== Standings ===
International League
Team	Win	Loss	%	GB
Montreal Royals	95	59	.617	–
Rochester Red Wings	83	69	.546	11
Syracuse Chiefs	82	71	.536	12.5
Buffalo Bisons	79	75	.513	16
Toronto Maple Leafs	77	76	.503	17.5
Baltimore Orioles	69	82	.457	24.5
Ottawa Giants	62	88	.413	31
Springfield Cubs	63	90	.412	31.5

== League Leaders ==
=== Batting leaders ===
Stat	Player	Total
AVG	Don Richmond, Rochester Red Wings	.350
H	Archie Wilson, Buffalo Bisons	191
R	Jim Gilliam, Montreal Royals	117
2B	Jack Wallaesa, Springfield Cubs	40
3B	Carmen Mauro, Springfield Cubs	11
HR	Marv Rickert, Baltimore Orioles	35
RBI	Archie Wilson, Buffalo Bisons	112
SB	Héctor Rodríguez, Montreal Royals	26

=== Pitching leaders ===
Stat	Player	Total
W	Johnny Hetki, Toronto Maple Leafs	19
L	Jack Robinson, Syracuse Chiefs	15
ERA	Alex Konikowski, Ottawa Giants	2.30
CG	Karl Drews, Baltimore Orioles	21
SHO	Alex Konikowski, Ottawa Giants; Eddie Yuhas, Rochester Red Wings	5
SO	Bill Miller, Syracuse Chiefs	131
IP	Johnny Hetki, Toronto Maple Leafs	256.0

== Playoffs ==
- The Montreal Royals won their fifth Governors' Cup, defeating the Syracuse Chiefs in five games.

=== Playoff bracket ===
Semi-finals
1	Montreal	4
4	Buffalo	0
2	Rochester	1
3	Syracuse	4

Governors' Cup
1	Montreal	4
3	Syracuse	1

== Awards ==
Player awards
Award name	Recipient	Position
Most Valuable Player	Archie Wilson, Buffalo Bisons	Outfielder
Rookie of the Year	Héctor Rodríguez, Montreal Royals	Third baseman

== See also ==
- 1951 Major League Baseball season
