= 1947 International League season =

- League: International League
- Sport: Baseball
- Duration: April 17 – September 24
- Games: 154
- Teams: 8

Regular season
- Season MVP: Hank Sauer, Syracuse Chiefs

Governors' Cup Playoffs
- League champions: Syracuse Chiefs
- Runners-up: Buffalo Bisons

IL seasons
- ← 1946 1948 →

The 1947 International League was a Class AAA baseball season played between April 17 and September 24. Eight teams played a 154-game schedule, with the top four teams qualifying for the post-season.

The Syracuse Chiefs won the Governors' Cup, defeating the Buffalo Bisons in the final round of the playoffs.

== Team changes ==
- The Toronto Maple Leafs ended their affiliation with the Philadelphia Athletics and began an affiliation with the Boston Red Sox.

== Teams ==
1947 International League
Team	City	MLB Affiliate	Stadium
Baltimore Orioles	Baltimore, Maryland	Cleveland Indians	Municipal Stadium
Buffalo Bisons	Buffalo, New York	Detroit Tigers	Offermann Stadium
Jersey City Giants	Jersey City, New Jersey	New York Giants	Roosevelt Stadium
Montreal Royals	Montreal, Quebec	Brooklyn Dodgers	Delorimier Stadium
Newark Bears	Newark, New Jersey	New York Yankees	Ruppert Stadium
Rochester Red Wings	Rochester, New York	St. Louis Cardinals	Red Wing Stadium
Syracuse Chiefs	Syracuse, New York	Cincinnati Reds	MacArthur Stadium
Toronto Maple Leafs	Toronto, Ontario	Boston Red Sox	Maple Leaf Stadium

== Map of teams ==
International League teams

== Regular season ==
=== Summary ===
- The Jersey City Giants finished with the best record in the regular season for the first time since 1939.
- The Newark Bears miss the post-season for the first time since the playoff format was introduced in 1932.

=== Standings ===
International League
Team	Win	Loss	%	GB
Jersey City Giants	94	60	.610	–
Montreal Royals	93	60	.608	0.5
Syracuse Chiefs	88	65	.575	5.5
Buffalo Bisons	77	75	.507	16
Rochester Red Wings	68	86	.442	26
Baltimore Orioles	65	89	.422	29
Newark Bears	65	89	.422	29
Toronto Maple Leafs	64	90	.416	30

== League Leaders ==
=== Batting leaders ===
Stat	Player	Total
AVG	Nippy Jones, Rochester Red Wings	.337
H	Hank Sauer, Syracuse Chiefs	182
R	Hank Sauer, Syracuse Chiefs	130
2B	Nippy Jones, Rochester Red Wings	36
3B	Nippy Jones, Rochester Red Wings	12
HR	Howie Moss, Baltimore Orioles	53
RBI	Hank Sauer, Syracuse Chiefs	141
SB	Bobby Wilson, Baltimore Orioles	36

=== Pitching leaders ===
Stat	Player	Total
W	Jim Prendergast, Syracuse Chiefs	20
L	Glenn Gardner, Rochester Red Wings; Johnny Podgajny, Baltimore Orioles	18
ERA	Luke Hamlin, Toronto Maple Leafs	2.22
CG	Jim Prendergast, Syracuse Chiefs	24
SHO	Jack Banta, Montreal Royals	7
SO	Jack Banta, Montreal Royals	199
IP	Jim Prendergast, Syracuse Chiefs	257.0

== Playoffs ==
- The Syracuse Chiefs won their fourth Governors' Cup, defeating the Buffalo Bisons in seven games.

=== Playoff bracket ===
Semi-finals
1	Jersey City	0
4	Buffalo	4
2	Montreal	0
3	Syracuse	4

Governors' Cup
4	Buffalo	3
3	Syracuse	4

== See also ==
- 1947 Major League Baseball season
