= Olean Oilers =

- 1939–1962; Olean, New York

Minor league affiliations
- Previous classes: Class D
- League: New York–Penn League (1957–1962)
- Previous leagues: Pennsylvania–Ontario–New York League (1939–1956)

Major league affiliations
- Previous teams: Boston Red Sox (1961–1962); Kansas City Athletics (1959); Philadelphia Phillies (1956–1958); New York Giants (1954); New York Yankees (1952–1953); St. Louis Browns (1949); Brooklyn Dodgers (1939–1948)

Minor league titles
- League titles: 1939; 1940; 1950; 1961

Team data
- Previous names: Olean Red Sox (1961–1962); Olean A's (1959); Olean Oilers (1955–1958); Olean Giants (1954); Olean Yankees (1952–1953); Olean Oilers (1939–1951)
- Previous parks: Bradner Stadium; Fred Handler Park (2012)
- Website: www.oleanoilers.com

The Olean Oilers are a collegiate summer baseball team located in Olean, New York playing in the New York Collegiate Baseball League since 2012.

The Olean Oilers were a minor league baseball team which played primarily in the New York–Penn League from 1939 to 1966, with a hiatus in 1960. Starting in 1952, the team often shared nicknames with its major league affiliates.

Both teams played their home games at Bradner Stadium.

== History ==
=== Professional team ===
The Oilers were preceded in minor league play by the Olean Refiners. Between 1908 and 1916, The Refiners played as members of the Class D level Interstate League.

The Oilers resumed minor league play, playing in the New York–Pennsylvania League from 1939 to 1951 and from 1955 to 1958. The league was known as the Pennsylvania–Ontario–New York League from 1939 to 1956. Their inaugural home game on May 11, 1939, was played in front of 3,300 spectators.

The Oilers were a minor league affiliate of the Brooklyn Dodgers from 1939 to 1948, the St. Louis Browns in 1949, and the Philadelphia Phillies from 1956 to 1958. The Oilers played their home games at Bradner Stadium.

The Oilers' president, Josephine Ross, was the only female president of an affiliated minor league team in 1959.

=== Collegiate summer team ===
Starting in 2012, the Olean Oilers name has been revived as a member of the New York Collegiate Baseball League. The team began play in the summer of 2012, initially playing on the campus of Saint Bonaventure University before returning to a renovated Bradner Stadium in 2014; a crowd of nearly 2,000 fans watched the Oilers during their first game back at Bradner. In their fourth year of play as an amateur squad, the Oilers won the 2015 NYCBL championship; the next year, the team went on a 24-game winning streak near the beginning of the season, doubling the previous league record, en route to a league record 39 wins and a second consecutive championship, won before a league record 2,876 fans at Bradner. Despite concerns over competitive balance as well as admitted discussions with the Perfect Game Collegiate Baseball League, the Oilers have shown a general preference to stay in the NYCBL for 2017. The Oilers eventually agreed to jump to the PCGBL in 2025.

== Year-by-year professional record ==
Year	Record	Finish	Manager	Playoffs
1939	65-38	1st	Jake Pitler	League Champs
1940	65-39	1st	Jake Pitler	League Champs
1941	48-61	5th	Jake Pitler	
1942	82-42	2nd	Jake Pitler	Lost League Finals
1943	43-66	6th	Jake Pitler	
1944	57-66	5th	John Fitzpatrick	
1945	40-86	8th	John Fitzpatrick	
1946	69-56	3rd	Greg Mulleavy	Lost in 1st round
1947	66-58	3rd	Greg Mulleavy	Lost League Finals
1948	60-66	7th	George Scherger	
1949	39-86	8th	Shan Deniston / Lawrence Mancini	
1950	71-54	2nd	Len Schulte	League Champs
1951	79-48	1st	Orval Cott	Lost League Finals
1952	70-55	3rd	Bunny Mick	Lost in 1st round
1953	63-61	5th	Bill Davis / Walter Lance	
1954	46-80	7th	Austin Knickerbocker / Frank Genovese	
1955	46-80	8th	Paul Owens	
1956	65-58	3rd	Paul Owens	Lost League Finals
1957	52-65	5th	Paul Owens	
1958	67-57	3rd	Benny Zientara	Lost in 1st round
1959	57-69	6th	William Robertson	
1961	64-61	4th	Harold Holland	League Champs
1962	62-57	3rd (t)	Harold Holland	Lost League Finals

== Notable alumni ==
- Mike Andrews (1962) MLB All-Star
- Ralph Branca (1943) 3 x MLB All-Star
- Jim Coates (1951) 2 x MLB All-Star
- Hal Gregg (1941) MLB All-Star
- Jim Hannan (1961)
- Ken Harrelson (1959) MLB All-Star
- Gene Hermanski (1941)
- Bob Montgomery (1962)
- Bobby Morgan (1944)
- Danny Ozark (1942)
- Paul Owens (1951, 1955–1957)
- Bobby Richardson (1953) 8 x MLB All-Star; 1960 World Series Most Valuable Player
- Andre Rodgers (1954)
- Stan Rojek (1939)
- Mike Ryan (1961)
- José Santiago (1959) MLB All-Star
- Dick Stigman (1955) 2 x MLB All-Star
