= 1945 International League season =

- League: International League
- Sport: Baseball
- Duration: April 19 – October 4
- Games: 154
- Teams: 8

Regular season
- Season MVP: Sherm Lollar, Baltimore Orioles

Governors' Cup Playoffs
- League champions: Newark Bears
- Runners-up: Montreal Royals

IL seasons
- ← 1944 1946 →

The 1945 International League was a Class AA baseball season played between April 19 and October 4. Eight teams played a 154-game schedule, with the top four teams qualifying for the post-season.

The Newark Bears won the Governors' Cup, defeating the Montreal Royals in the final round of the playoffs.

== Team changes ==
- The Toronto Maple Leafs ended their affiliation with the Pittsburgh Pirates and began an affiliation with the Philadelphia Athletics.

== Teams ==
1945 International League
Team	City	MLB Affiliate	Stadium
Baltimore Orioles	Baltimore, Maryland	Cleveland Indians	Municipal Stadium
Buffalo Bisons	Buffalo, New York	Detroit Tigers	Offermann Stadium
Jersey City Giants	Jersey City, New Jersey	New York Giants	Roosevelt Stadium
Montreal Royals	Montreal, Quebec	Brooklyn Dodgers	Delorimier Stadium
Newark Bears	Newark, New Jersey	New York Yankees	Ruppert Stadium
Rochester Red Wings	Rochester, New York	St. Louis Cardinals	Red Wing Stadium
Syracuse Chiefs	Syracuse, New York	Cincinnati Reds	MacArthur Stadium
Toronto Maple Leafs	Toronto, Ontario	Philadelphia Athletics	Maple Leaf Stadium

== Map of teams ==
International League teams

== Regular season ==
=== Summary ===
- The Montreal Royals finished with the best record in the regular season for the first time since 1935.

=== Standings ===
International League
Team	Win	Loss	%	GB
Montreal Royals	95	58	.621	–
Newark Bears	89	64	.582	6
Toronto Maple Leafs	85	67	.559	9.5
Baltimore Orioles	80	73	.523	15
Jersey City Giants	71	82	.464	24
Buffalo Bisons	64	89	.418	31
Syracuse Chiefs	64	89	.418	31
Rochester Red Wings	64	90	.416	31.5

== League Leaders ==
=== Batting leaders ===
Stat	Player	Total
AVG	Sherm Lollar, Baltimore Orioles	.364
H	Walter Cazen, Syracuse Chiefs; Roland Gladu, Montreal Royals	204
R	Frank Skaff, Baltimore Orioles	128
2B	Roland Gladu, Montreal Royals	45
3B	Roland Gladu, Montreal Royals	14
HR	Frank Skaff, Baltimore Orioles	38
RBI	Frank Skaff, Baltimore Orioles	126
SB	Walter Cazen, Syracuse Chiefs	74

=== Pitching leaders ===
Stat	Player	Total
W	Jean-Pierre Roy, Montreal Royals	25
L	Frank Radler, Syracuse Chiefs	23
ERA	Frank Hiller, Newark Bears	2.58
CG	Jean-Pierre Roy, Montreal Royals	29
SHO	Karl Drews, Newark Bears	6
SO	Jean-Pierre Roy, Montreal Royals	139
IP	Jean-Pierre Roy, Montreal Royals	293.0

== Playoffs ==
- The Newark Bears won their fourth Governors' Cup, defeating the Montreal Royals in seven games.

=== Playoff bracket ===
Semi-finals
1	Montreal	4
4	Baltimore	3
2	Newark	4
3	Toronto	2

Governors' Cup
1	Montreal	3
2	Newark	4

== See also ==
- 1945 Major League Baseball season
