= 1933 International League season =

- League: International League
- Sport: Baseball
- Duration: April 12 – September 10
- Games: 168
- Teams: 8

Regular season
- Season MVP: Red Rolfe, Newark Bears

Governors' Cup Playoffs
- League champions: Buffalo Bisons
- Runners-up: Rochester Red Wings

IL seasons
- ← 1932 1934 →

The 1933 International League was a Class AA baseball season played between April 12 and September 10. Eight teams played a 168-game schedule, with the top four teams qualifying for the post-season.

The Buffalo Bisons won the Governors' Cup, defeating the Rochester Red Wings in the final round of the playoffs.

== Team changes ==
- The Jersey City Skeeters are no longer affiliated with the Brooklyn Dodgers.
- The Albany Senators play their first full season in Albany, New York.

== Teams ==
1933 International League
Team	City	MLB Affiliate	Stadium
Albany Senators	Albany, New York	None	Hawkins Stadium
Baltimore Orioles	Baltimore, Maryland	None	Oriole Park
Buffalo Bisons	Buffalo, New York	None	Bison Stadium
Jersey City Skeeters	Jersey City, New Jersey	None	West Side Park
Montreal Royals	Montreal, Quebec	None	Delorimier Stadium
Newark Bears	Newark, New Jersey	New York Yankees	Bear Stadium
Rochester Red Wings	Rochester, New York	St. Louis Cardinals	Red Wing Stadium
Toronto Maple Leafs	Toronto, Ontario	Detroit Tigers	Maple Leaf Stadium

== Map of teams ==
International League teams

== Regular season ==
=== Summary ===
- Frank Shaughnessy, general manager of the Montreal Royals, devised a playoff system that was used for the Governors' Cup playoffs to determine a league champion.
- Under the new playoff format, the top four teams in the league qualified for the post-season.

=== Standings ===
International League
Team	Win	Loss	%	GB
Newark Bears	102	62	.622	–
Rochester Red Wings	88	77	.533	14.5
Baltimore Orioles	84	80	.512	18
Buffalo Bisons	83	85	.494	21
Toronto Maple Leafs	82	85	.491	21.5
Montreal Royals	81	84	.491	21.5
Albany Senators	80	84	.488	22
Jersey City Skeeters	61	104	.370	41.5

== League Leaders ==
=== Batting leaders ===
Stat	Player	Total
AVG	Moose Solters, Baltimore Orioles	.391
H	Greg Mulleavy, Buffalo Bisons	206
R	Buzz Arlett, Baltimore Orioles	135
2B	Oscar Roettger, Montreal Royals	52
3B	Len Koenecke, Buffalo Bisons; George Selkirk, Newark/Rochester	15
HR	Buzz Arlett, Baltimore Orioles	39
RBI	Moose Solters, Baltimore Orioles	158
SB	Fresco Thompson, Jersey City/Buffalo	35

=== Pitching leaders ===
Stat	Player	Total
W	Jim Weaver, Newark Bears	25
L	Orlin Collier, Toronto Maple Leafs	17
ERA	Fritz Ostermueller, Rochester Red Wings	2.44
CG	Luke Hamlin, Toronto Maple Leafs	23
SHO	Charlie Devens, Newark Bears	4
SO	Jim Weaver, Newark Bears	175
IP	Jimmie DeShong, Newark Bears	269.0

== Playoffs ==
- The Buffalo Bisons won the first ever Governors' Cup, defeating the Rochester Red Wings in six games.

=== Playoff bracket ===
Semi-finals
1	Newark	1
2	Rochester	3
3	Baltimore	0
4	Buffalo	3

Governors' Cup
3	Rochester	2
4	Buffalo	4

== See also ==
- 1933 Major League Baseball season
