= 1946 International League season =

- League: International League
- Sport: Baseball
- Duration: April 17 – September 26
- Games: 154
- Teams: 8

Regular season
- Season MVP: Eddie Robinson, Baltimore Orioles

Governors' Cup Playoffs
- League champions: Montreal Royals
- Runners-up: Syracuse Chiefs

IL seasons
- ← 1945 1947 →

The 1946 International League was a Class AAA baseball season played between April 17 and September 26. Eight teams played a 154-game schedule, with the top four teams qualifying for the post-season.

The Montreal Royals won the Governors' Cup, defeating the Syracuse Chiefs in the final round of the playoffs.

== League changes ==
- Prior to this season, the top level of Minor League Baseball was Double-A, which had been established in 1912. The Triple-A classification was created beginning in the 1946 season.

== Teams ==
1946 International League
Team	City	MLB Affiliate	Stadium
Baltimore Orioles	Baltimore, Maryland	Cleveland Indians	Municipal Stadium
Buffalo Bisons	Buffalo, New York	Detroit Tigers	Offermann Stadium
Jersey City Giants	Jersey City, New Jersey	New York Giants	Roosevelt Stadium
Montreal Royals	Montreal, Quebec	Brooklyn Dodgers	Delorimier Stadium
Newark Bears	Newark, New Jersey	New York Yankees	Ruppert Stadium
Rochester Red Wings	Rochester, New York	St. Louis Cardinals	Red Wing Stadium
Syracuse Chiefs	Syracuse, New York	Cincinnati Reds	MacArthur Stadium
Toronto Maple Leafs	Toronto, Ontario	Philadelphia Athletics	Maple Leaf Stadium

== Map of teams ==
International League teams

== Regular season ==
=== Summary ===
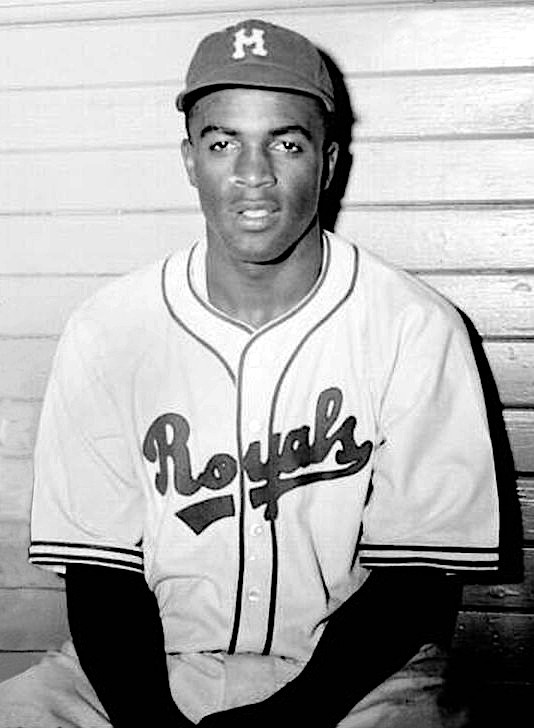
Jackie Robinson with the Montreal Royals in July 1946.

- The Montreal Royals finished with the best record in the regular season for the second consecutive season.
- Jackie Robinson, Roy Partlow and Johnny Wright of the Montreal Royals became the first African-American players in the minor leagues in 30 years.

=== Standings ===
International League
Team	Win	Loss	%	GB
Montreal Royals	100	54	.649	–
Syracuse Chiefs	81	72	.529	18.5
Baltimore Orioles	81	73	.526	19
Newark Bears	80	74	.519	20
Buffalo Bisons	78	75	.510	21.5
Toronto Maple Leafs	71	82	.464	28.5
Rochester Red Wings	65	87	.428	34
Jersey City Giants	57	96	.373	42.5

== League Leaders ==
=== Batting leaders ===
Stat	Player	Total
AVG	Jackie Robinson, Montreal Royals	.349
H	Bobby Brown, Newark Bears; Danny Murtaugh, Rochester Red Wings	174
R	Soup Campbell, Baltimore Orioles; Jackie Robinson, Montreal Royals	113
2B	Eddie Joost, Rochester Red Wings	35
3B	Marv Rackley, Montreal Royals	14
HR	Howie Moss, Baltimore Orioles	38
RBI	Eddie Robinson, Baltimore Orioles	123
SB	Marv Rackley, Montreal Royals	65

=== Pitching leaders ===
Stat	Player	Total
W	Steve Nagy, Montreal Royals; Jim Prendergast, Syracuse Chiefs	17
L	Max Surkont, Rochester Red Wings	17
ERA	Herb Karpel, Newark Bears	2.41
CG	Bud Byerly, Rochester Red Wings	21
SHO	Joe Coleman, Toronto Maple Leafs; Earl Harrist, Syracuse Chiefs	5
SO	Art Houtteman, Buffalo Bisons	147
IP	Art Houtteman, Buffalo Bisons	226.0

== Playoffs ==
- The Montreal Royals won their first Governors' Cup, defeating the Syracuse Chiefs in five games.

=== Playoff bracket ===
Semi-finals
1	Montreal	4
4	Newark	2
2	Syracuse	4
3	Baltimore	2

Governors' Cup
1	Montreal	4
2	Syracuse	1

== See also ==
- 1946 Major League Baseball season
