= 1950 International League season =

- League: International League
- Sport: Baseball
- Duration: April 20 – September 27
- Games: 154
- Teams: 8

Regular season
- Season MVP: Tom Poholsky, Rochester Red Wings

Governors' Cup Playoffs
- League champions: Baltimore Orioles
- Runners-up: Rochester Red Wings

IL seasons
- ← 1949 1951 →

The 1950 International League was a Class AAA baseball season played between April 20 and September 27. Eight teams played a 154-game schedule, with the top four teams qualifying for the post-season.

The Baltimore Orioles won the Governors' Cup, defeating the Rochester Red Wings in the final round of the playoffs.

== Team changes ==
- The Newark Bears relocated to Springfield, Massachusetts and became the Springfield Cubs and would be affiliated with the Chicago Cubs.
- The Buffalo Bisons ended their affiliation with the Detroit Tigers and began an affiliation with the Philadelphia Athletics.

== Teams ==
1950 International League
Team	City	MLB Affiliate	Stadium
Baltimore Orioles	Baltimore, Maryland	St. Louis Browns	Municipal Stadium
Buffalo Bisons	Buffalo, New York	Philadelphia Athletics	Offermann Stadium
Jersey City Giants	Jersey City, New Jersey	New York Giants	Roosevelt Stadium
Montreal Royals	Montreal, Quebec	Brooklyn Dodgers	Delorimier Stadium
Rochester Red Wings	Rochester, New York	St. Louis Cardinals	Red Wing Stadium
Springfield Cubs	Springfield, Massachusetts	Chicago Cubs	Pynchon Park
Syracuse Chiefs	Syracuse, New York	Cincinnati Reds	MacArthur Stadium
Toronto Maple Leafs	Toronto, Ontario	Philadelphia Phillies	Maple Leaf Stadium

== Map of teams ==
International League teams

== Regular season ==
=== Summary ===
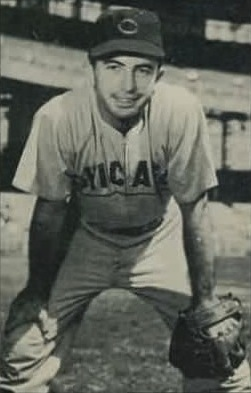
Randy Jackson of the Springfield Cubs, seen here with the Chicago Cubs, won the first ever International League Rookie of the Year award.

- The Rochester Red Wings finished with the best record in the regular season for the first time since 1940.
- Randy Jackson of the Springfield Cubs won the first ever International League Rookie of the Year award.

=== Standings ===
International League
Team	Win	Loss	%	GB
Rochester Red Wings	92	59	.609	–
Montreal Royals	86	67	.562	7
Baltimore Orioles	85	68	.556	8
Jersey City Giants	81	70	.536	11
Springfield Cubs	74	78	.487	18.5
Syracuse Chiefs	74	79	.484	19
Toronto Maple Leafs	60	90	.400	31.5
Buffalo Bisons	56	97	.366	37

== League Leaders ==
=== Batting leaders ===
Stat	Player	Total
AVG	Don Richmond, Rochester Red Wings	.333
H	Don Richmond, Rochester Red Wings	191
R	Don Richmond, Rochester Red Wings	126
2B	Dee Phillips, Montreal Royals	34
3B	George Byam, Baltimore Orioles	12
HR	Russ Derry, Rochester Red Wings	30
RBI	Russ Derry, Rochester Red Wings	102
SB	Pete Pavlick, Jersey City Giants	23

=== Pitching leaders ===
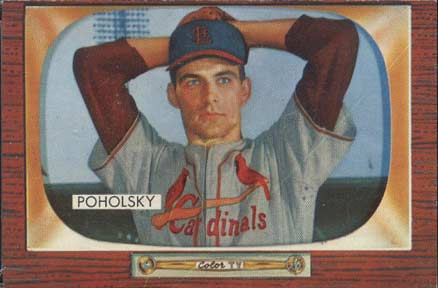
Tom Poholsky of the Rochester Red Wings, seen here with the St. Louis Cardinals in 1955, won the MVP Award.

Stat	Player	Total
W	Tom Poholsky, Rochester Red Wings	18
L	Harold Wood, Buffalo Bisons	16
ERA	Tom Poholsky, Rochester Red Wings	2.17
CG	Tom Poholsky, Rochester Red Wings	21
SHO	Carl Erskine, Montreal Royals; Bill Kennedy, Baltimore Orioles; Tom Poholsky, Rochester Red Wings	5
SO	Roger Bowman, Jersey City Giants	181
IP	Roger Bowman, Jersey City Giants	233.0

== Playoffs ==
- The Baltimore Orioles won their second Governors' Cup, defeating the Rochester Red Wings in six games.

=== Playoff bracket ===
Semi-finals
1	Rochester	4
4	Jersey City	2
2	Montreal	3
3	Baltimore	4

Governors' Cup
1	Rochester	2
3	Baltimore	4

== Awards ==
Player awards
Award name	Recipient	Position
Most Valuable Player	Tom Poholsky, Rochester Red Wings	Pitcher
Rookie of the Year	Randy Jackson, Springfield Cubs	Third baseman

== See also ==
- 1950 Major League Baseball season
