= Frank Genovese =

- Outfielder
- Born: November 23, 1914; Staten Island, New York, U.S.
- Died: February 12, 1981 (aged 66); Orlando, Florida, U.S.
- Batted: Left Threw: Right

Frank Charles "Chick" Genovese (November 23, 1914 – February 12, 1981) was an American professional baseball player, manager and scout. Genovese was a minor league outfielder standing 5 feet 9 inches (1.75 m) tall who threw right-handed and batted left-handed. He managed six different teams within the New York Giants farm system from 1949 to 1956, and worked as a scout for many years.

While managing the Giants' Class B farm team in Trenton in 1950, Genovese became the first professional manager of Willie Mays, and taught Mays his famous basket catch. Genovese was also credited with scouting and signing players including Felipe, Matty, and Jesús Alou, Juan Marichal, Tito Fuentes, and Manny Mota.

In 1954 he was the co-manager with Austin Knickerbocker of the Olean Giants, a minor league team affiliated with the New York Giants. The team had been known locally as the Olean Oilers in the Pennsylvania–Ontario–New York League and played their home games at Bradner Stadium in Olean, New York. He married Edith Broughton (b. 1918).

His brother George Genovese was also in baseball, as a player, minor league manager, and scout.

Chick Genovese died at age 66 on February 12, 1981, in Orlando, Florida.

Genovese was inducted into the Staten Island Sports Hall of Fame in 2005.

== See also ==
- List of people from Staten Island § Baseball
