= Lembo =

Lembo is a surname. Notable people with the surname include:

- Alejandro Lembo (born 1978), Uruguayan footballer
- Cláudio Lembo (born 1934), Brazilian lawyer, politician and academic
- Kevin Lembo (born 1963), American politician
- Pete Lembo (born 1970), American football player and coach
- Steve Lembo (1926–1989), American baseball player

== See also ==
- Lembos, Hellenistic-era light warship
