= Virginia True =

American painter (1900–1989)

- Born: February 7, 1900; St. Louis, Missouri, U.S.
- Died: January 4, 1989 (aged 88); Gillett, Pennsylvania, U.S.
- Education: Herron School of Art and Design; Cornell University (MFA)
- Known for: Painting
- Movement: Regionalism

Virginia True (February 7, 1900 – January 4, 1989) was an American painter and educator. She was said to "epitomize the pioneer spirit of the United States in the early twentieth century".

== Early life ==
True was born on February 7, 1900, in St. Louis. Although both parents were classical musicians, True herself exhibited her innate talent in the visual arts rather than the musical field.

She began her college education at Butler University's College of Education, but chose to complete her studies at the John Herron Art Institute (now known as the Herron School of Art and Design), in Indianapolis, Indiana. At the time, Indianapolis had an active arts community, which included noted artists, such as William Merritt Chase, Frank Duveneck and the renowned New Mexico printmaker, Gustave Baumann. True's education at the Herron was followed by a one-year scholarship to the Pennsylvania Academy of the Fine Arts.

True first visited the Southwest in 1928, when she and several friends from the Herron Institute took a road trip through Northern New Mexico. They traveled down the High Road from Taos into the Rio Grande Valley and Santa Fe. Her response to the culture and landscape of New Mexico was intense: "Might I preserve on canvas my thrill and deep feeling of the grand things of nature I have beheld today."

== Reception ==
In 1929, True accepted a position in the Fine Arts Department of the University of Colorado in Boulder. In 1931, she exhibited for the first time at the New Mexico Museum of Art. The Santa Fe New Mexican published positive reviews that same year of her work in a group exhibition for "non-Modernists", and again in 1932 for a solo show: "paints with a boldness and strength of purpose that leads one to think of a man's work."

Building on her success, True joined with fellow artists to embrace Regionalism, an artistic school of thought that placed great value on a sense of place and community. Calling themselves The Prospectors, the group of five participated in exhibitions around the country, where True was judged to be the most accomplished artist. Often featuring manmade structures in the landscape, True's watercolors and oil paintings demonstrate her keen powers of observation and artistic ability, and her appreciation for the natural environment is evident.

== Later life and death ==
In 1935, True recognized that she could go no further at the University of Colorado with a simple Bachelor of Arts, so she began a Master of Arts program at Cornell University. By the time she completed her studies, however, the University of Colorado had no position for her, so she stayed in the East and began teaching at Cornell.

There she was commissioned to paint a mural "The History of Home Economics" in 1937 and eventually became the chairman of the Department of Housing and Design. She spent the rest of her life in the East, retiring to Cape Cod where she taught art for several years and continued to paint and exhibit.

Virginia True's perception of the artist's life is amply demonstrated by her comment that "to be an artist is a very upsetting thing, because you must come to grips with what you really think and what is really basic and what is truly you."

She died on January 4, 1989, in Gillett, Pennsylvania, and was interred in Hannibal, Missouri.
