= 1949 International League season =

- League: International League
- Sport: Baseball
- Duration: April 21 – September 27
- Games: 154
- Teams: 8

Regular season
- Season MVP: Bobby Morgan, Montreal Royals

Governors' Cup Playoffs
- League champions: Montreal Royals
- Runners-up: Buffalo Bisons

IL seasons
- ← 1948 1950 →

The 1949 International League was a Class AAA baseball season played between April 21 and September 27. Eight teams played a 154-game schedule, with the top four teams qualifying for the post-season.

The Montreal Royals won the Governors' Cup, defeating the Buffalo Bisons in the final round of the playoffs.

== Team changes ==
- The Baltimore Orioles ended their affiliation with the Cleveland Indians and began an affiliation with the St. Louis Browns.

== Teams ==
1949 International League
Team	City	MLB Affiliate	Stadium
Baltimore Orioles	Baltimore, Maryland	St. Louis Browns	Municipal Stadium
Buffalo Bisons	Buffalo, New York	Detroit Tigers	Offermann Stadium
Jersey City Giants	Jersey City, New Jersey	New York Giants	Roosevelt Stadium
Montreal Royals	Montreal, Quebec	Brooklyn Dodgers	Delorimier Stadium
Newark Bears	Newark, New Jersey	New York Yankees	Ruppert Stadium
Rochester Red Wings	Rochester, New York	St. Louis Cardinals	Red Wing Stadium
Syracuse Chiefs	Syracuse, New York	Cincinnati Reds	MacArthur Stadium
Toronto Maple Leafs	Toronto, Ontario	Philadelphia Phillies	Maple Leaf Stadium

== Map of teams ==
International League teams

== Regular season ==
=== Summary ===
- The Buffalo Bisons finished with the best record in the regular season for the first time since 1936.

=== Standings ===
International League
Team	Win	Loss	%	GB
Buffalo Bisons	90	64	.584	–
Rochester Red Wings	85	67	.559	4
Montreal Royals	84	70	.545	6
Jersey City Giants	83	71	.539	7
Toronto Maple Leafs	80	72	.526	9
Syracuse Chiefs	73	80	.477	16.5
Baltimore Orioles	63	91	.409	27
Newark Bears	55	98	.359	34.5

== League Leaders ==
=== Batting leaders ===
Stat	Player	Total
AVG	Bobby Morgan, Montreal Royals	.337
H	Sam Jethroe, Montreal Royals	207
R	Sam Jethroe, Montreal Royals	154
2B	Bobby Morgan, Montreal Royals	38
3B	Sam Jethroe, Montreal Royals	19
HR	Russ Derry, Rochester Red Wings	42
RBI	Steve Bilko, Rochester Red Wings	125
SB	Sam Jethroe, Montreal Royals	89

=== Pitching leaders ===
Stat	Player	Total
W	Al Widmar, Baltimore Orioles	22
L	John Maldovan, Baltimore Orioles	16
ERA	Bubba Church, Toronto Maple Leafs	2.35
CG	Al Widmar, Baltimore Orioles	26
SHO	George Bamberger, Jersey City Giants; George Copeland, Rochester Red Wings	5
SO	Dan Bankhead, Montreal Royals	176
IP	Al Widmar, Baltimore Orioles	294.0

== Playoffs ==
- The Montreal Royals won their third Governors' Cup in four seasons, defeating the Buffalo Bisons in five games.

=== Playoff bracket ===
Semi-finals
1	Buffalo	4
4	Jersey City	1
2	Rochester	0
3	Montreal	4

Governors' Cup
1	Buffalo	1
3	Montreal	4

== See also ==
- 1949 Major League Baseball season
