= 1944 International League season =

- League: International League
- Sport: Baseball
- Duration: April 20 – October 4
- Games: 154
- Teams: 8

Regular season
- Season MVP: Howie Moss, Baltimore Orioles

Governors' Cup Playoffs
- League champions: Baltimore Orioles
- Runners-up: Newark Bears

IL seasons
- ← 1943 1945 →

The 1944 International League was a Class AA baseball season played between April 20 and October 4. Eight teams played a 154-game schedule, with the top four teams qualifying for the post-season.

The Baltimore Orioles won the Governors' Cup, defeating the Newark Bears in the final round of the playoffs.

== Teams ==
1944 International League
Team	City	MLB Affiliate	Stadium
Baltimore Orioles	Baltimore, Maryland	Cleveland Indians	Oriole Park; Municipal Stadium
Buffalo Bisons	Buffalo, New York	Detroit Tigers	Offermann Stadium
Jersey City Giants	Jersey City, New Jersey	New York Giants	Roosevelt Stadium
Montreal Royals	Montreal, Quebec	Brooklyn Dodgers	Delorimier Stadium
Newark Bears	Newark, New Jersey	New York Yankees	Ruppert Stadium
Rochester Red Wings	Rochester, New York	St. Louis Cardinals	Red Wing Stadium
Syracuse Chiefs	Syracuse, New York	Cincinnati Reds	MacArthur Stadium
Toronto Maple Leafs	Toronto, Ontario	Pittsburgh Pirates	Maple Leaf Stadium

== Map of teams ==
International League teams

== Regular season ==
=== Summary ===
- The Baltimore Orioles finished with the best record in the regular season for the first time since 1925.
- On the night of July 3, Oriole Park was burned down due to a fire. The Baltimore Orioles quickly arranged to move into a temporary home, Municipal Stadium for the remainder of the season. Due to the large crowds and motivated by the Orioles success, the City of Baltimore chose to renovate Municipal Stadium and it would become the Orioles permanent home.

=== Standings ===
International League
Team	Win	Loss	%	GB
Baltimore Orioles	84	68	.553	–
Newark Bears	85	69	.552	–
Toronto Maple Leafs	79	74	.516	5.5
Buffalo Bisons	78	76	.506	7
Jersey City Giants	74	79	.484	10.5
Montreal Royals	73	80	.477	11.5
Rochester Red Wings	71	82	.464	13.5
Syracuse Chiefs	68	84	.447	16

== League Leaders ==
=== Batting leaders ===
Stat	Player	Total
AVG	Mayo Smith, Buffalo Bisons	.340
H	Howie Moss, Baltimore Orioles	178
R	Blas Monaco, Baltimore Orioles	135
2B	Howie Moss, Baltimore Orioles	44
3B	Eddie Malone, Rochester Red Wings	21
HR	Howie Moss, Baltimore Orioles	27
RBI	Howie Moss, Baltimore Orioles	141
SB	Escal Burnett, Rochester Red Wings	41

=== Pitching leaders ===
Stat	Player	Total
W	Red Embree, Baltimore Orioles	19
L	Sid West, Baltimore Orioles	16
ERA	Woody Crowson, Toronto Maple Leafs	2.41
CG	Hod Lisenbee, Syracuse Chiefs	24
SHO	Frank Hiller, Newark Bears; Prince Oana, Buffalo Bisons	6
SO	Red Embree, Baltimore Orioles	225
IP	Hod Lisenbee, Syracuse Chiefs	248.0

== Playoffs ==
- The Baltimore Orioles won their first Governors' Cup, defeating the Newark Bears in seven games.

=== Playoff bracket ===
Semi-finals
1	Baltimore	4
4	Buffalo	3
2	Newark	4
3	Toronto	0

Governors' Cup
1	Baltimore	4
2	Newark	3

== See also ==
- 1944 Major League Baseball season
