= Carroll B. Land Stadium =

Ballpark in San Diego, California

- America's Most Scenic Ballpark
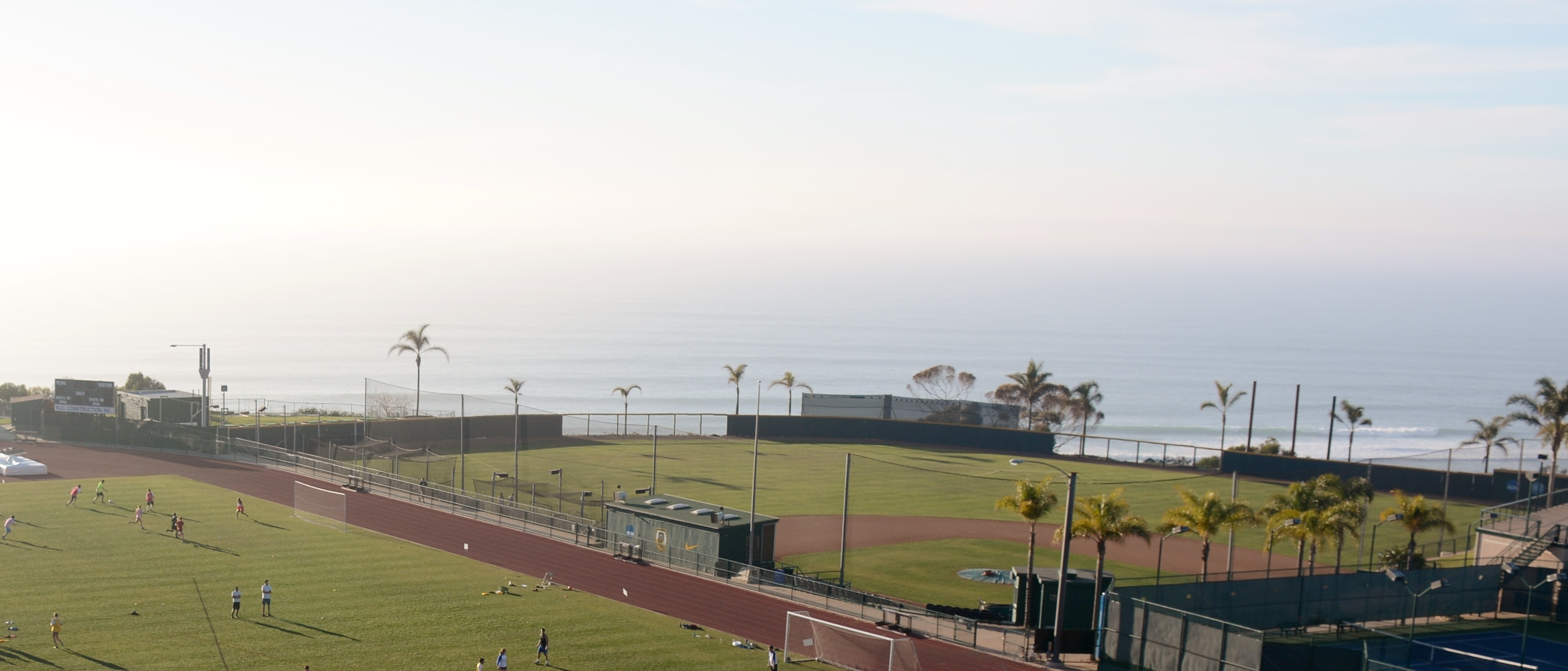
- Carroll B. Land Stadium in 2016, with the soccer field/running track in the lower left
- Interactive map of Carroll B. Land Stadium
- Address: 3900 Lomaland Drive; La Jolla, California; United States
- Coordinates: 32°42′58″N 117°15′9″W
- Owner: Point Loma Nazarene University
- Operator: Point Loma Nazarene University
- Surface: Grass

Tenants
- Cal Western / USIU Westerners (NAIA) (–1973); Point Loma Crusaders / Sea Lions (NCAA) (1973–present)

Website
- plnusealions.com/carroll-b-land-stadium

Carroll B. Land Stadium is a ballpark in San Diego, California, United States. Located on the campus of Point Loma Nazarene University (PLNU), it is the home of the Point Loma Sea Lions baseball team. The Sea Lions compete in NCAA Division II as a member of the Pacific West Conference (PacWest).

Known as "America's Most Scenic Ballpark", the venue is located on the cliffs of Point Loma overlooking the Pacific Ocean, providing spectators with views of the water through see-through chain-link fences in both the right-center and left-center field.

The stadium is named after Carroll Land, the longtime PLNU head baseball coach and athletic director who was instrumental in the development of both the stadium and the school's athletic program as a whole.

== History ==
=== Early history and renovations ===
The stadium site was previously used as a ballfield for the California Western University (later known as United States International University) baseball team, which won the 1973 NAIA World Series in their last season on campus. That year, the campus was sold to Pasadena College, which relocated to San Diego and was renamed Point Loma College (later becoming Point Loma Nazarene University). However, the Point Loma baseball team inherited "a beat up baseball field", or, as the The San Diego Union-Tribune put it, "barely a ballfield" at all. Head coach Carroll B. Land, who was a skilled carpenter himself, raised funds and gathered players, coaches, and administrators to help transform the field into a full-fledged ballpark. Land, according to future head coach Justin James, "basically built it by hand."

Retaining walls were installed along the foul lines to prevent the constant ground-rule doubles lost in the weeds that grew nearby, and the dilapidated wooden fences were reinforced. Six-foot tall "dug-ups" were replaced with proper dugouts. The improvements continued into the 1980s, when a concession stand and restrooms were built, and the wooden fence was replaced with a chain-link one. Later additions included batting cages, a simulated pitching zone, a new scoreboard, a new batter's eye, a new announcing booth, and box seats over the home dugout. Seats were also brought in from Angel Stadium to replace the concrete benches, and a 2,800 ft (850 m) observation deck was built over a new athletic training clinic. In 2015, more than 200 seats donated by Petco Park were installed to replace the old seats from Angel Stadium. That December, a windstorm knocked over the third iteration of the scoreboard. Its replacement, the first with an LED video board, was installed in partnership with Daktronics.

Extensive renovations were performed shortly after the conclusion of the 2016 season, starting with the removal of the 40-year-old turf around home plate and the 60-year-old outfield grass (which dated back to before the school's move to the San Diego campus). Dozens of truckloads of dirt were brought in to level the entire playing field, aiming to reduce flooding during heavy rains. The pitcher's mound was also rebuilt to professional standards. Paired with improvements to the irrigation system, the renovations were estimated to save 500,000 US gal (1,900,000 L; 420,000 imp gal) of water a year. Land said he was excited "to have the field back in pristine playing shape".

In 2023, a retaining wall was built along the northwest edge of the stadium to support the hillside beneath the venue, which had been identified as a concern due to erosion.

=== Other developments ===
In 1994, the stadium's pitching mound was the site of a wedding ceremony between a pitcher on the baseball team, Dan Auchard, and a pitcher on the softball team, Jackie Volkert.

In 1998, the ballpark was named Carroll B. Land Stadium to honor Carroll Land, the school's longtime head baseball coach and athletic director, following his induction into the American Baseball Coaches Association (ABCA) Hall of Fame.

The stadium has often hosted the Lions Tournament, the (self-proclaimed) oldest and largest high school baseball tournament in the country, which rotates between different local college fields. It was also used as part of the 2012 Perfect Game All-American Classic for practice, a scrimmage, and a home run derby. Additionally, the field has been used as a practice field by Major League Baseball players.

The stadium hosted its first NCAA Division II tournament regional in 2022.

== Description ==
Located on the southwestern side of the PLNU campus, the venue is perched on the Sunset Cliffs in San Diego. It overlooks the Pacific Ocean, which serves as a panoramic backdrop in the outfield. Despite appearing very close to the field ("like you might drop down into it if you take a step behind the fence"), the water is in fact located about 1/4 of a mile down, with trails leading down to the beach. An onshore breeze blows in on most days, reaching speeds of up to 20 miles per hour (32 km/h), which can make hitting home runs difficult. When the see-through chain-link fences in the outfield were replaced with padded fencing, portions of the chain-link in both the right-center and left-center field were left intact to provide views of the water down below; the school calls them "windows".

Aside from the normal seating, the stadium has a club-view seating box over the home dugout. A 2,800 ft (850 m) observation deck on the rooftop of the athletic training center provides unobstructed views of the field as well. Additionally, there are grassy seating areas down the foul lines, with Land noting: "Fans here are closer to the field than about anywhere you can imagine".

The beautiful view from Carroll B. Land Stadium seems nearly limitless, and when I think of Coach Land, that limitless view of life and its possibilities seems to characterize him best. – PLNU president Bob Brower after Land's 2021 death

The stadium is part of a larger athletic complex, which also includes tennis courts, a running track, and a soccer field, as well as a basketball and volleyball arena, Golden Gym, all of which overlook the ocean. It is also located just behind the historic Greek Amphitheatre, which became the first Greek theater built in the U.S. in 1901.

=== Reception ===
In 1993, San Diego Union-Tribune sportwriter Kevin Kernan was on the PLNU campus covering the NAIA women's volleyball championship when he spotted the baseball field and its picturesque views. This prompted him to write an article titled "America's Most Scenic Ballpark", which appeared in both the Union-Tribune and Baseball America, and the moniker stuck. The nickname is displayed on the scoreboard in right-center field, which is flanked by palm trees. The Quad-City Times wrote in 1994 that "the field sits majestically on Sunset Cliffs in a postcard-like setting more than 200 feet above the Pacific Ocean."

In 2013, it was listed as one of the top 50 notable sports sites in San Diego County by John Maffei of the San Diego Union-Tribune, who wrote: "There are bigger college ballparks. Ballparks with better amenities, more seating, bigger scoreboards and for sure more parking. But no ballpark in America - college or professional - has a better view.".

In 2017, it was voted the best stadium in NCAA Division II in a poll conducted by HERO Sports.

In 2022, the venue was discussed in a feature story titled "A look inside 'America's most scenic ballpark'" by MLB.com's Matt Monagan.

In 2024, it was ranked one of the 11 best stadium backdrops in college baseball by Sam Harrigan of NCAA.com, who wrote that it provided "some of the most breathtaking views the sport has to offer."

The facilities have been cited as a feature which helps convince potential recruits to commit to the school, including future MLB player Otto Kemp. In 2000, former PLNU player Josh Van Vessen spoke to his hometown paper, The Hammond Times: "Our baseball field was called America's most scenic ballpark. It overlooks the ocean. You could see sailboats in the background, people surfing. They flew me in for a recruiting visit and once I saw it, I was sold."
