= 1934 International League season =

- League: International League
- Sport: Baseball
- Duration: April 18 – September 9
- Games: 154
- Teams: 8

Regular season
- Season MVP: Ike Boone, Toronto Maple Leafs

Governors' Cup Playoffs
- League champions: Toronto Maple Leafs
- Runners-up: Rochester Red Wings

IL seasons
- ← 1933 1935 →

The 1934 International League was a Class AA baseball season played between April 18 and September 9. Eight teams played a 154-game schedule, with the top four teams qualifying for the post-season.

The Toronto Maple Leafs won the Governors' Cup, defeating the Rochester Red Wings in the final round of the playoffs.

== Team changes ==
- The Jersey City Skeeters relocated to Syracuse, New York and are renamed the Syracuse Chiefs.
- The Toronto Maple Leafs ended their affiliation with the Detroit Tigers and became an affiliate with the Cincinnati Reds.
- The Albany Senators became an affiliate with the Washington Senators.
- The Syracuse Chiefs became an affiliate with the Boston Red Sox.

== Teams ==
1934 International League
Team	City	MLB Affiliate	Stadium
Albany Senators	Albany, New York	Washington Senators	Hawkins Stadium
Baltimore Orioles	Baltimore, Maryland	None	Oriole Park
Buffalo Bisons	Buffalo, New York	None	Bison Stadium
Montreal Royals	Montreal, Quebec	None	Delorimier Stadium
Newark Bears	Newark, New Jersey	New York Yankees	Ruppert Stadium
Rochester Red Wings	Rochester, New York	St. Louis Cardinals	Red Wing Stadium
Syracuse Chiefs	Syracuse, New York	Boston Red Sox	Municipal Stadium
Toronto Maple Leafs	Toronto, Ontario	Cincinnati Reds	Maple Leaf Stadium

== Map of teams ==
International League teams

== Regular season ==
=== Summary ===
- The regular season was shortened from 168 games to match the Major League Baseball schedule of 154 games.
- The Newark Bears finished with the best regular season record for the third consecutive season.

=== Standings ===
International League
Team	Win	Loss	%	GB
Newark Bears	93	60	.608	–
Rochester Red Wings	88	63	.583	4
Toronto Maple Leafs	85	67	.559	7.5
Albany Senators	81	72	.529	12
Buffalo Bisons	76	77	.497	17
Montreal Royals	73	77	.487	18.5
Syracuse Chiefs	60	94	.390	33.5
Baltimore Orioles	53	99	.349	39.5

== League Leaders ==
=== Batting leaders ===
Stat	Player	Total
AVG	Ike Boone, Toronto Maple Leafs	.372
H	Jess Hill, Newark Bears	205
R	Greg Mulleavy, Buffalo Bisons	131
2B	Greg Mulleavy, Buffalo Bisons	38
3B	Tom Winsett, Rochester Red Wings	13
HR	Vince Barton, Newark Bears	35
RBI	Fred Sington, Albany Senators	144
SB	Hub Walker, Montreal Royals	33

=== Pitching leaders ===
Stat	Player	Total
W	Jumbo Brown, Newark Bears	20
L	Cliff Melton, Baltimore Orioles	20
ERA	Jumbo Brown, Newark Bears	2.56
CG	Jumbo Brown, Newark Bears	21
SHO	Jumbo Brown, Newark Bears	6
SO	Cy Blanton, Albany Senators	165
IP	Jumbo Brown, Newark Bears	2.39

== Playoffs ==
- The Toronto Maple Leafs won their first Governors' Cup, defeating the Rochester Red Wings in five games.

=== Playoff bracket ===
Semi-finals
1	Newark	3
3	Toronto	4
2	Rochester	4
4	Albany	1

Governors' Cup
3	Toronto	4
2	Rochester	1

== See also ==
- 1934 Major League Baseball season
