= 1948 International League season =

- League: International League
- Sport: Baseball
- Duration: April 22 – September 29
- Games: 154
- Teams: 8

Regular season
- Season MVP: Jimmy Bloodworth, Montreal Royals

Governors' Cup Playoffs
- League champions: Montreal Royals
- Runners-up: Syracuse Chiefs

IL seasons
- ← 1947 1949 →

The 1948 International League was a Class AAA baseball season played between April 22 and September 29. Eight teams played a 154-game schedule, with the top four teams qualifying for the post-season.

The Montreal Royals won the Governors' Cup, defeating the Syracuse Chiefs in the final round of the playoffs.

== Team changes ==
- The Toronto Maple Leafs ended their affiliation with the Boston Red Sox and began an affiliation with the Philadelphia Phillies.

== Teams ==
1948 International League
Team	City	MLB Affiliate	Stadium
Baltimore Orioles	Baltimore, Maryland	Cleveland Indians	Municipal Stadium
Buffalo Bisons	Buffalo, New York	Detroit Tigers	Offermann Stadium
Jersey City Giants	Jersey City, New Jersey	New York Giants	Roosevelt Stadium
Montreal Royals	Montreal, Quebec	Brooklyn Dodgers	Delorimier Stadium
Newark Bears	Newark, New Jersey	New York Yankees	Ruppert Stadium
Rochester Red Wings	Rochester, New York	St. Louis Cardinals	Red Wing Stadium
Syracuse Chiefs	Syracuse, New York	Cincinnati Reds	MacArthur Stadium
Toronto Maple Leafs	Toronto, Ontario	Philadelphia Phillies	Maple Leaf Stadium

== Map of teams ==
International League teams

== Regular season ==
=== Summary ===
- The Montreal Royals finished with the best record in the regular season for the second time in three seasons.

=== Standings ===
International League
Team	Win	Loss	%	GB
Montreal Royals	94	59	.614	–
Newark Bears	80	72	.526	13.5
Syracuse Chiefs	77	73	.513	15.5
Rochester Red Wings	78	75	.510	16
Toronto Maple Leafs	78	76	.506	16.5
Buffalo Bisons	71	80	.470	22
Jersey City Giants	69	83	.454	24.5
Baltimore Orioles	59	88	.401	32

== League Leaders ==
=== Batting leaders ===
Stat	Player	Total
AVG	Coaker Triplett, Buffalo Bisons	.353
H	Johnny Groth, Buffalo Bisons	199
R	Johnny Groth, Buffalo Bisons	124
2B	Johnny Groth, Buffalo Bisons	37
3B	Johnny Groth, Buffalo Bisons	16
HR	Howie Moss, Baltimore Orioles	33
RBI	Ed Sanicki, Toronto Maple Leafs	107
SB	Sam Jethroe, Montreal Royals; Johnny Welaj, Toronto Maple Leafs	18

=== Pitching leaders ===
Stat	Player	Total
W	Jack Banta, Montreal Royals; Bill Reeder, Rochester Red Wings	19
L	Bob Kuzava, Baltimore Orioles; Andy Tomasic, Jersey City Giants; Johnnie Wittig, Baltimore Orioles	16
ERA	Bob Porterfield, Newark Bears	2.17
CG	Dixie Howell, Syracuse Chiefs	27
SHO	Bob Porterfield, Newark Bears	6
SO	Jack Banta, Montreal Royals	193
IP	Dixie Howell, Syracuse Chiefs; Bill Reeder, Rochester Red Wings	247.0

== Playoffs ==
- The Montreal Royals won their second Governors' Cup in three seasons, defeating the Syracuse Chiefs in five games.

=== Playoff bracket ===
Semi-finals
1	Montreal	4
4	Rochester	3
2	Newark	3
3	Syracuse	4

Governors' Cup
1	Montreal	4
3	Syracuse	1

== See also ==
- 1948 Major League Baseball season
