= 1932 International League season =

- League: International League
- Sport: Baseball
- Duration: April 13 – September 18
- Games: 168
- Teams: 8

International League Pennant
- League champions: Newark Bears
- Runners-up: Baltimore Orioles
- Season MVP: Marv Owen, Toronto/Newark

IL seasons
- ← 1931 1933 →

The 1932 International League was a Class AA baseball season played between April 13 and September 18. Eight teams played a 168-game schedule, with the first place team winning the pennant.

The Newark Bears won the International League pennant, finishing in first place, fifteen-and-a-half games ahead of the second place Baltimore Orioles.

== Team changes ==
- The Jersey City Skeeters are affiliated with the Brooklyn Dodgers.
- The Newark Bears are affiliated with the New York Yankees.
- The Toronto Maple Leafs are affiliated with the Detroit Tigers.
- During the season, the Reading Keystones relocated to Albany, New York and are renamed the Albany Senators.

== Teams ==
1932 International League
Team	City	MLB Affiliate	Stadium
Baltimore Orioles	Baltimore, Maryland	None	Oriole Park
Buffalo Bisons	Buffalo, New York	None	Bison Stadium
Jersey City Skeeters	Jersey City, New Jersey	Brooklyn Dodgers	West Side Park
Montreal Royals	Montreal, Quebec	None	Delorimier Stadium
Newark Bears	Newark, New Jersey	New York Yankees	Bear Stadium
Reading Keystones; Albany Senators	Reading, Pennsylvania; Albany, New York	None	Lauer's Park; Hawkins Stadium
Rochester Red Wings	Rochester, New York	St. Louis Cardinals	Red Wing Stadium
Toronto Maple Leafs	Toronto, Ontario	Detroit Tigers	Maple Leaf Stadium

== Map of teams ==
International League teams

== Regular season ==
=== Summary ===
- The Newark Bears won the pennant for the first time in franchise history.
- The Reading Keystones relocated to Albany, New York on August 6, becoming the Albany Senators.
- Marv Owen, who split the season between the Toronto Maple Leafs and Newark Bears, became the first player to win the International League Most Valuable Player Award.

=== Standings ===
International League
Team	Win	Loss	%	GB
Newark Bears	109	59	.649	–
Baltimore Orioles	93	74	.557	15.5
Buffalo Bisons	91	75	.548	17
Montreal Royals	90	78	.536	19
Rochester Red Wings	88	79	.527	20.5
Jersey City Skeeters	73	94	.437	35.5
Reading Keystones/Albany Senators	71	97	.423	38
Toronto Maple Leafs	54	113	.323	54.5

== League Leaders ==
=== Batting leaders ===
Stat	Player	Total
AVG	George Puccinelli, Rochester Red Wings	.391
H	Johnny Neun, Newark Bears	212
R	Buzz Arlett, Baltimore Orioles	141
2B	Ollie Tucker, Buffalo Bisons	52
3B	Ivey Shiver, Montreal Royals	16
HR	Buzz Arlett, Baltimore Orioles	54
RBI	Buzz Arlett, Baltimore Orioles	144
SB	Johnny Neun, Newark Bears	25

=== Pitching leaders ===
Stat	Player	Total
W	Don Brennan, Newark Bears	26
L	Guy Cantrell, Toronto Maple Leafs; George Milstead, Reading/Albany; Carroll Yerkes, Reading/Albany	17
ERA	Don Brennan, Newark Bears	2.79
CG	Don Brennan, Newark Bears	21
SHO	Don Brennan, Newark Bears	6
SO	Beryl Richmond, Baltimore Orioles	155
IP	Gowell Claset, Montreal Royals	282.0

== See also ==
- 1932 Major League Baseball season
