= 1935 International League season =

- League: International League
- Sport: Baseball
- Duration: April 17 – September 23
- Games: 154
- Teams: 8

Regular season
- Season MVP: George Puccinelli, Baltimore Orioles

Governors' Cup Playoffs
- League champions: Syracuse Chiefs
- Runners-up: Montreal Royals

IL seasons
- ← 1934 1936 →

The 1935 International League was a Class AA baseball season played between April 17 and September 23. Eight teams played a 154-game schedule, with the top four teams qualifying for the post-season.

The Syracuse Chiefs won the Governors' Cup, defeating the Montreal Royals in the final round of the playoffs.

== Teams ==
1935 International League
Team	City	MLB Affiliate	Stadium
Albany Senators	Albany, New York	Washington Senators	Hawkins Stadium
Baltimore Orioles	Baltimore, Maryland	None	Oriole Park
Buffalo Bisons	Buffalo, New York	None	Offermann Stadium
Montreal Royals	Montreal, Quebec	None	Delorimier Stadium
Newark Bears	Newark, New Jersey	New York Yankees	Ruppert Stadium
Rochester Red Wings	Rochester, New York	St. Louis Cardinals	Red Wing Stadium
Syracuse Chiefs	Syracuse, New York	Boston Red Sox	Municipal Stadium
Toronto Maple Leafs	Toronto, Ontario	Cincinnati Reds	Maple Leaf Stadium

== Map of teams ==
International League teams

== Regular season ==
=== Summary ===
- The Montreal Royals finished with the best regular season record for the first time in team history.

=== Standings ===
International League
Team	Win	Loss	%	GB
Montreal Royals	92	62	.597	–
Syracuse Chiefs	87	67	.565	5
Buffalo Bisons	86	67	.562	5.5
Newark Bears	81	71	.533	10
Baltimore Orioles	78	74	.513	13
Toronto Maple Leafs	78	76	.506	14
Rochester Red Wings	61	91	.401	30
Albany Senators	49	104	.320	42.5

== League Leaders ==
=== Batting leaders ===
Stat	Player	Total
AVG	George Puccinelli, Baltimore Orioles	.359
H	George Puccinelli, Baltimore Orioles	209
R	George Puccinelli, Baltimore Orioles	135
2B	George Puccinelli, Baltimore Orioles	49
3B	Al Niemiec, Syracuse Chiefs	15
HR	George Puccinelli, Baltimore Orioles	53
RBI	George Puccinelli, Baltimore Orioles	172
SB	Ernie Koy, Newark Bears	33

=== Pitching leaders ===
Stat	Player	Total
W	Pete Appleton, Montreal Royals	23
L	Dutch Lieber, Albany Senators	19
ERA	Joe Cascarella, Syracuse Chiefs	2.35
CG	Pete Appleton, Montreal Royals; Harry Smythe, Montreal Royals	23
SHO	Ted Kleinhans, Newark Bears	6
SO	Bill Harris, Buffalo Bisons	137
IP	Ken Ash, Buffalo Bisons	279.0

== Playoffs ==
- The Syracuse Chiefs won their first Governors' Cup, defeating the Montreal Royals in seven games.

=== Playoff bracket ===
Semi-finals
1	Montreal	4
3	Buffalo	2
2	Syracuse	4
4	Newark	0

Governors' Cup
1	Montreal	3
2	Syracuse	4

== See also ==
- 1935 Major League Baseball season
