= Batter's eye =

Baseball-related feature of a stadium

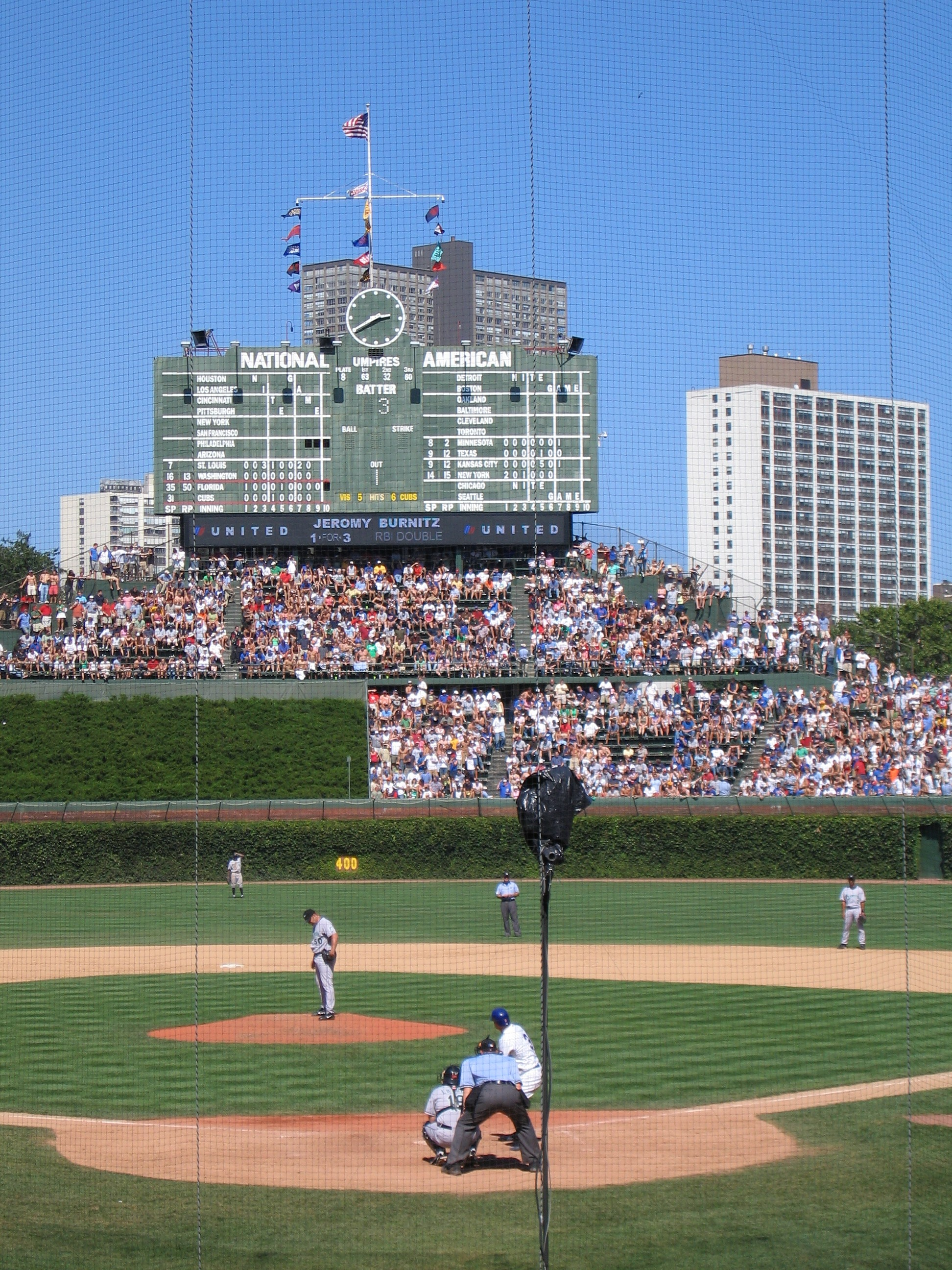
Wrigley Field, before the 2005–2006 remodeling, with juniper-filled batter's eye section visible.

The batter's eye or batter's eye screen is a solid-colored, usually dark area beyond the center field wall of a baseball park, that is the visual backdrop directly in the line of sight of a baseball batter, while facing the pitcher and awaiting a pitch. This dark surface allows the batter to see the pitched ball against a sharply contrasted and uncluttered background. Its purpose is the safety and hitting success of the batter. The use of a batter's background has been standard in baseball since at least the late 19th century. The batter's eye performs the same role in baseball as the sight screen does in cricket.

== Design and seating ==
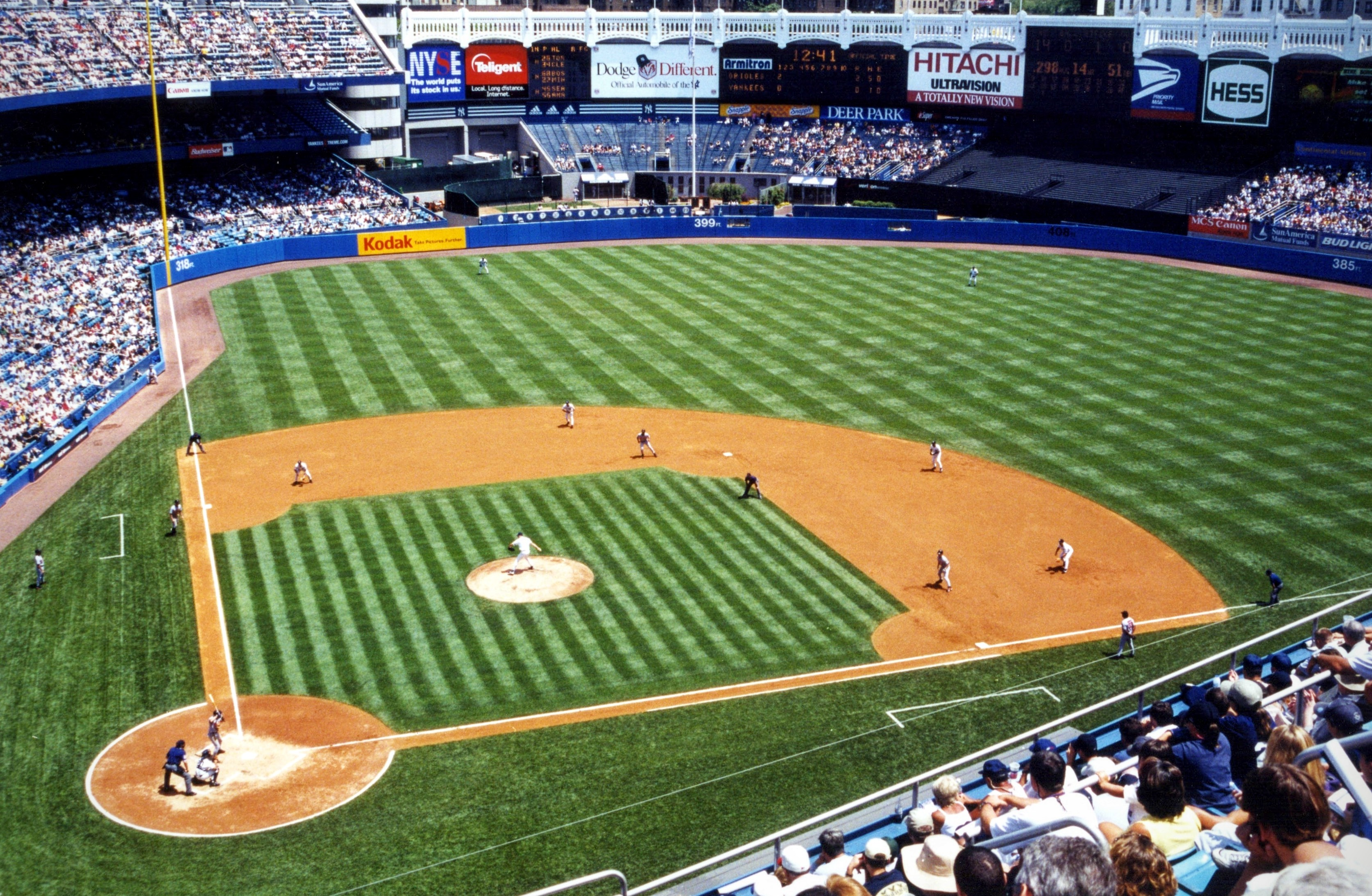
The old Yankee Stadium with batter's eye visible on upper right above the center field fence

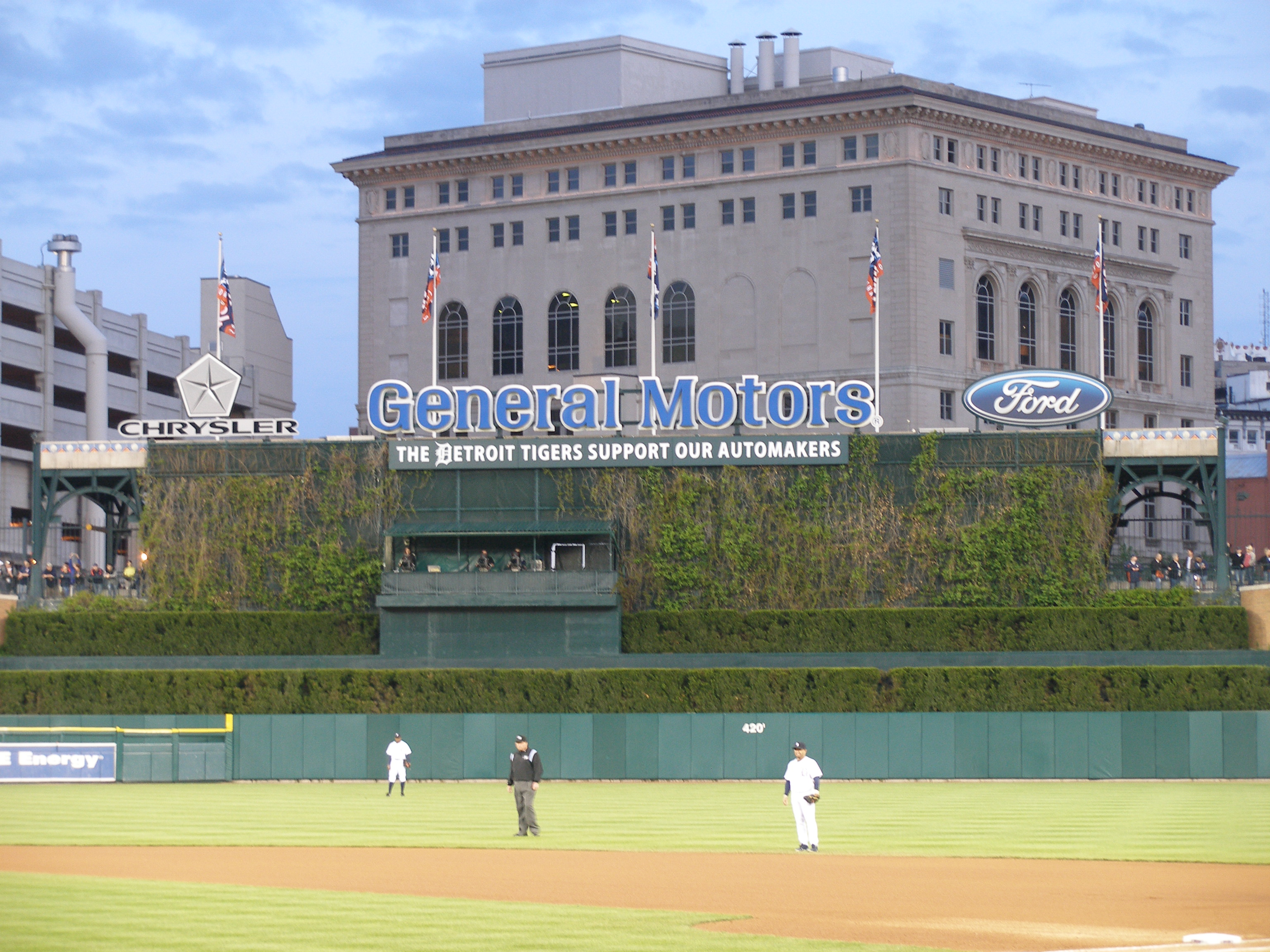
The batter's eye at Comerica Park is covered in shrubbery and has a fountain on top of it.

The batter's eye area is usually painted or otherwise decorated in black, dark green, or another color dark enough to allow batters to track the flight of the white ball. If there are seats behind center field, they are painted a dark color and are not occupied during baseball games, as the "black bleachers" section is directly in front of them. If fans were allowed to sit in this section, it would create a pitcher's advantage, in addition to raising the batter's exposure to danger, as it would make it more difficult for the batter to track the ball if a substantial number of fans were wearing white shirts.

One example of a batter's background is the black area in the center-field bleachers section of the original Yankee Stadium, known as the Black Seats. At one time, there were seats where the black area was, but because of distractions the seats were removed and the area painted black. (Before the stadium's mid-1970s renovation, a batter's eye screen was often put up in front of the section.)

At Fenway Park in Boston, the batter's eye is made by laying a tarp over a section of the center field bleachers. During day games, the seats will not be sold so the tarp can be laid down; however, during night games, when the batter is more likely to be able to see the ball regardless of the backdrop, the seats are sold. This has often created unusual seating arrangements during night games that are made up during part of a day-night doubleheader as the sections remain uncovered for the people who have purchased the seats. The Red Sox have solved this problem by handing out T-shirts of the same color to these fans to wear during the game. At Wrigley Field, the center field bleachers used to be closed off and covered by a tarpaulin, and later by juniper plants. There is now a shaded luxury suite there referred to by the Cubs as the "Bud Light Batter's Eye".

Some stadiums have rotating billboards in this area. In this case, advertisements are displayed in between innings, while a dark surface is rotated in while the game is in play. This method was used at Shea Stadium (and continues at Shea's replacement, Citi Field) in New York, Oracle Park in San Francisco, and at Petco Park in San Diego. Tropicana Field in St. Petersburg, Florida had a restaurant called the Batter's Eye Restaurant. The current Yankee Stadium has a restaurant with dark tinted glass that serves as the batter's eye.

The pitch clock, which was made compulsory in the 2023 Major League Baseball season and in NCAA Division I baseball in 2024, requires an outfield timer to be installed outside the batter's eye, but is positioned in such a manner to its left or right in centerfield where the batter is able to glance it, along with the umpire and catcher.

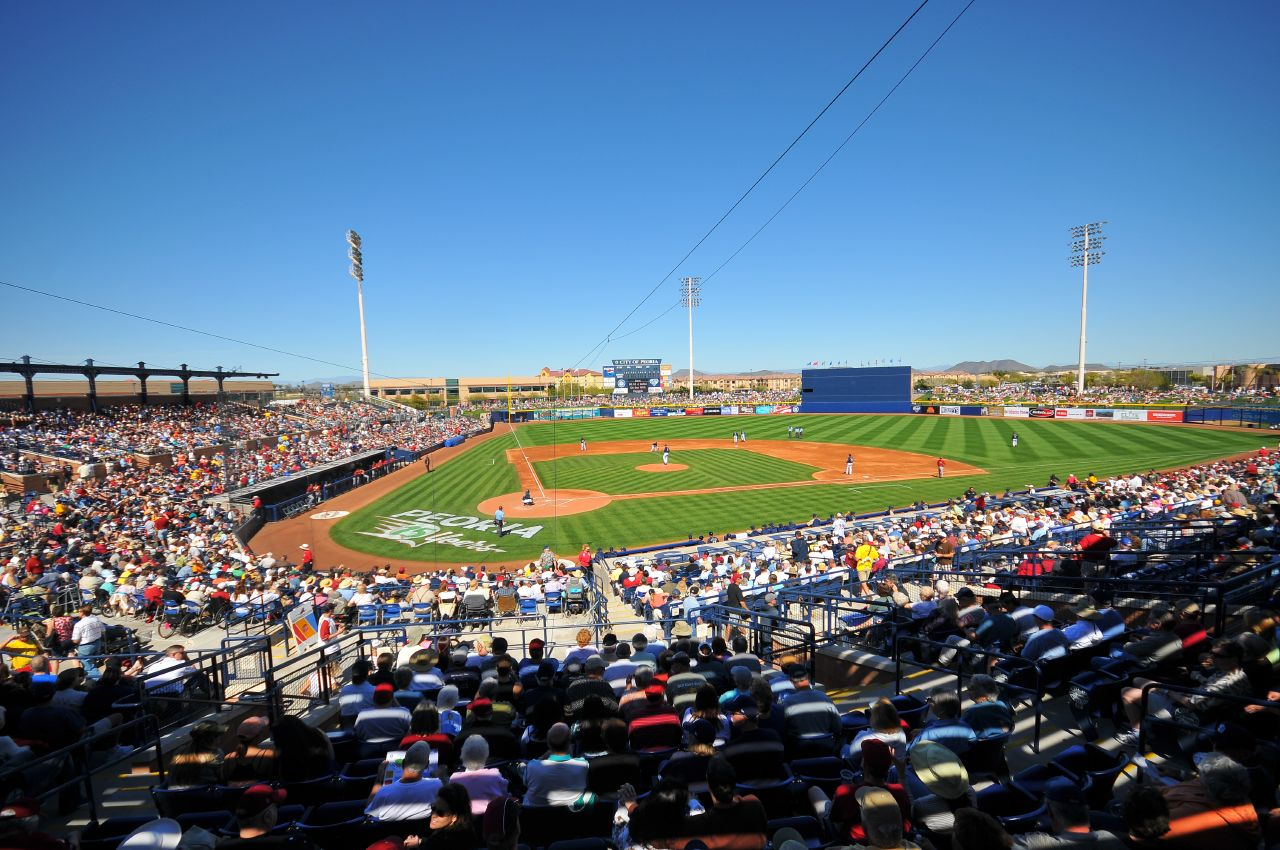
Peoria Sports Complex, a spring training and minor-league ballpark in Arizona, has a blue batter's eye in center field.

Ballparks in Minor League Baseball are normally much smaller than major-league parks, and the vast majority have no seats or other sections in the outfield that would distract batters or obstruct their view of the pitched ball. Bradner Stadium in Olean, New York, was notorious for its configuration that had batters facing directly into the sunset, requiring Olean Oilers games to temporarily stop for "sun breaks" and resume after sunset; the professional Oilers left Olean in the 1970s and when baseball returned in the 2010s, the stadium was reoriented to avoid this problem. Other minor or independent league stadiums have erected tall, dark, stand-alone batters-eye screens in center to ensure there is no interference with the batter's view. For example, beyond the batter's eye screen looming over center field in SIUH Community Park, home of the Staten Island FerryHawks, is Upper New York Bay. The batter's eye screen prevents, in day games, the glare of the hazy ocean air and, in night games, the lights from lower Manhattan, from being an impediment to batters. During intermission or between games, the screen can be retracted to allow the spectators to view the skyline of New York in the distance.
