= Al Epperly =

American baseball player (1918–2003)

- Pitcher
- Born: May 7, 1918; Glidden, Iowa, U.S.
- Died: April 14, 2003 (aged 84); McFarland, Wisconsin, U.S.
- Batted: Left Threw: Right

MLB debut
- April 25, 1938, for the Chicago Cubs

Last MLB appearance
- July 7, 1950, for the Brooklyn Dodgers

MLB statistics
- Win–loss record: 2–0
- Earned run average: 4.00
- Strikeouts: 13
- Stats at Baseball Reference

Teams
- Chicago Cubs (1938); Brooklyn Dodgers (1950)

Albert "Tub" Paul Epperly (May 7, 1918 – April 14, 2003) was an American pitcher in Major League Baseball. He played in nine games for the Chicago Cubs in 1938. He won his first start as a rookie. While he was with the Cubs, Epperly wore uniform number 56, had eight at-bats, two hits, one double, and two runs. He pitched five games for the Brooklyn Dodgers in 1950 wearing number 11 on his jersey. He worked for the sheriff's office in Scott County, Iowa from 1954 to 1984. He died at the age of 84, in McFarland, Wisconsin, where he lived with his daughter, and is buried in Davenport Memorial Park, Davenport, Iowa.
