= Walter Cazen =

- Outfielder
- Born: September 29, 1911; Niagara Falls, New York, U.S.
- Died: May 7, 1946 (aged 34); Lockport, New York, U.S.
- Batted: Right Threw: Right
- Stats at Baseball Reference

Walter E. Cazen (September 29, 1911 – May 7, 1946) was an American professional baseball player. An outfielder, Cazen played his entire career in minor league baseball.

== Hall of Fame ==
Cazen played from 1931 through 1945. He played in the International League for eight seasons as a member of the Baltimore Orioles, Rochester Red Wings, and Syracuse Chiefs. He set Chiefs records for stolen bases in a career (140) and for a single season (74), and the single season hits record. In December 1945, Cazen was diagnosed with tuberculosis. He died the following May at age 34.

In 2002, he was named to the Syracuse Baseball Wall of Fame. He was inducted into the International League Hall of Fame in 2009.
