= Bradner Stadium =

Multi-purpose stadium in Olean, NY, US

Coordinates: 42.077187°N 78.420576°W

Bradner Stadium is a multi-purpose stadium in Olean, New York. The stadium, which can accommodate both baseball and football, served as home to minor-league baseball teams including the Olean Oilers and Olean Yankees. The stadium was built in 1926 and was substantially renovated in 2013. It holds 4,000 people and primarily serves as the home stadium of the Olean Oilers collegiate baseball team for over 20 summer games as well as the Olean High School and Archbishop Walsh football teams in the fall. The stadium accommodates several community events as well.

The stadium was approved by a public vote on February 27, 1926, and was finished for the 1928 baseball season. The facility was named after patrons John H. & Marcia B. Bradner, who donated to the construction effort.

During the stadium's original baseball years, the field became notorious for its poor drainage and its configuration that had batters facing blinding sunlight when a game was played near sunset (the stadium lacked a batter's eye), which forced baseball games to be suspended until the sun set below the horizon. The stadium's baseball configuration was removed in the 1970s in what was then a successful effort to improve the drainage in the stadium, and when the stadium was again reconfigured for baseball decades later, the diamond was reoriented to avoid the "sun breaks".

In 2009, the semi-professional Southern Tier Diesel of the Northeastern Football Alliance relocated from Wayland to begin play at the stadium. The Diesel was evicted after the 2015 season, with the mayor of Olean saying that the team had damaged the playing field during a game in the 2015 season that was played in a rainstorm. The Diesel were able to negotiate a compromise before the 2016 season that limits their home appearances to one game per month during baseball season. A revived Olean Oilers, this version a member of the New York Collegiate Baseball League, took up residence at the stadium in 2013; as of 2026, this Oilers is in the Perfect Game Collegiate Baseball League.

== Notable events ==
In 1947, Hall-of-Fame player Jackie Robinson played at Bradner with the Brooklyn Dodgers.
