= Jake Pitler =

American baseball player and coach (1894–1968)

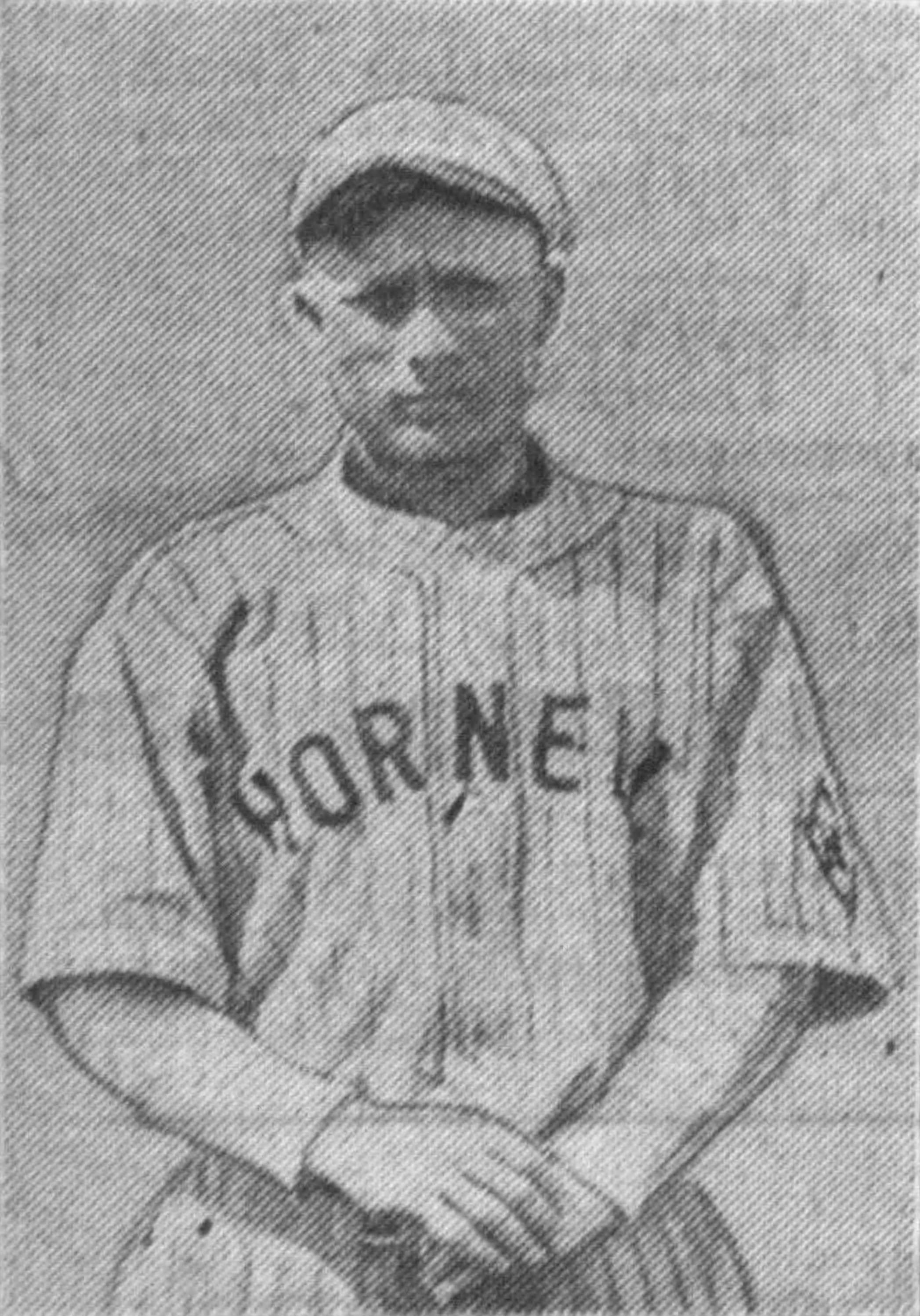
- Second baseman
- Born: April 22, 1894; New York City, U.S.
- Died: February 3, 1968 (aged 73); Binghamton, New York, U.S.
- Batted: Right Threw: Right

MLB debut
- May 30, 1917, for the Pittsburgh Pirates

Last MLB appearance
- May 24, 1918, for the Pittsburgh Pirates

MLB statistics
- Batting average: .232
- Home runs: 0
- Runs batted in: 23
- Stats at Baseball Reference

Teams
- As player: Pittsburgh Pirates (1917–1918); As coach: Brooklyn Dodgers (1947–1957)

Career highlights and awards
- World Series champion (1955)

Jacob Albert Pitler (April 22, 1894 – February 3, 1968) was an American second baseman and longtime coach in Major League Baseball. Born in New York City, and Jewish, he moved with his family to Western Pennsylvania when he was a boy, and he grew up in Beaver Falls and Pittsburgh.

== Baseball career ==
Pitler stood 5 feet 8 inches (1.73 m) tall, weighed 150 pounds (68 kg) and batted and threw right-handed. He began his professional playing career in 1913 at Jackson of the Class C Southern Michigan Association. When that league disbanded in 1915, Pitler was picked up by the Chattanooga Lookouts of the Class A Southern Association. He was batting a healthy .364 in 42 games when his contract was purchased by the Pittsburgh Pirates in the midseason of 1917 during the World War I manpower crisis. He played in 109 games for Pittsburgh that season, and two contests in 1918, compiling a .232 average in 383 at bats with no home runs and 23 runs batted in. Pitler holds the record for most putouts in a game by a second baseman, with 15, made in a 22-inning game on August 22, 1917. After rejecting a minor-league assignment in early 1918, Pitler left the ranks of "organized baseball" for almost a decade.

During much of the 1920s, Pitler played in semi-professional or "outlaw" leagues. But in 1928, he joined the Binghamton Triplets of the New York–Pennsylvania League and became a fixture in that circuit, playing also for Elmira and Hazleton, and beginning his managing career in 1934 with Scranton.

In 1939, Pitler joined the Brooklyn Dodgers as a minor league manager, winning back-to-back pennants with the Olean Oilers of the PONY League in 1939–40. He was promoted to the Dodger coaching staff in 1947 and remained a member of it through the end of the team's stay in Brooklyn in 1957 — through six National League championships and Brooklyn's lone world title, which came in 1955.

Pitler usually served as Brooklyn's first-base coach and worked under Dodger managers Leo Durocher, Burt Shotton, Chuck Dressen and Walter Alston. He appeared in Roger Kahn's memoir The Boys of Summer as a somewhat obsequious aide to Dressen. But with his minor league managing background, he was also hailed as a fatherly figure to Dodger rookies and young players. He was cited for that role in poet Marianne Moore's paean to the 1955 champions, Hometown Piece for Messrs. Alston and Reese.

Pitler retired as a coach after the 1957 season rather than move with the Dodgers to Los Angeles, but continued his association with the team as a scout. He died in Binghamton, New York, in 1968 at the age of 73. In 1991, he was inducted into the Jewish Sports Hall of Fame in Pittsburgh.

== See also ==
- List of Jewish Major League Baseball players
