= Jim Romano =

American baseball player (1927-1990)

- Pitcher
- Born: April 6, 1927; Brooklyn, New York, U.S.
- Died: September 12, 1990 (aged 63); New York City, U.S.
- Batted: Right Threw: Right

MLB debut
- September 21, 1950, for the Brooklyn Dodgers

Last MLB appearance
- September 29, 1950, for the Brooklyn Dodgers

MLB statistics
- Record: 0-0
- Earned run average: 5.68
- Strikeouts: 8
- Stats at Baseball Reference

Teams
- Brooklyn Dodgers (1950)

James King Romano (April 6, 1927 – September 12, 1990) was an American right-handed pitcher in Major League Baseball. Born in Brooklyn, New York, he pitched in three games for the Brooklyn Dodgers during the 1950 baseball season. He died at age 63 in New York City.
