= Archie Wilson (baseball) =

American baseball player (1923–2007)

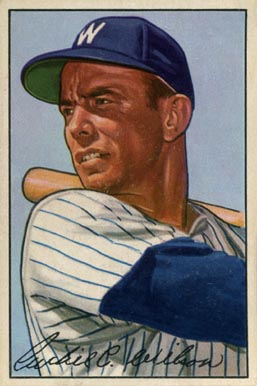
- Outfielder
- Born: November 25, 1923; Los Angeles, California, U.S.
- Died: April 28, 2007 (aged 83); Decatur, Alabama, U.S.
- Batted: Right Threw: Right

MLB debut
- September 18, 1951, for the New York Yankees

Last MLB appearance
- August 5, 1952, for the Boston Red Sox

MLB statistics
- Batting average: .221
- Home runs: 0
- Runs batted in: 17
- Stats at Baseball Reference

Teams
- New York Yankees (1951–1952); Washington Senators (1952); Boston Red Sox (1952)

Archibald Clifton Wilson (November 25, 1923 – April 28, 2007) was a professional baseball player. He played parts of two seasons in Major League Baseball for three teams from 1951 to 1952, primarily as an outfielder. Listed at 5 ft 11 in (1.80 m), 175 lb (79 kg), Wilson batted and threw right-handed. He was born in Los Angeles. He attended and graduated from Franklin High School in Los Angeles.

In 1951, Wilson was elected the International League MVP while playing for the Buffalo Bisons. He later would be inducted in the International League Hall of Fame.

Wilson entered the majors late in the year with the New York Yankees, playing for them in part of two seasons before being traded along with Jackie Jensen and Spec Shea to the Washington Senators in the same transaction that brought Irv Noren to the Yankees. His stay in Washington was brief because he was sent to the Boston Red Sox in exchange for Ken Wood.

In a 51-game Major League career, Wilson was a .221 hitter (31-for-140) with nine runs, five doubles, three triples, and 17 RBI without any home runs. After his Major League career, he returned to the minor leagues, where he played until 1962, including seven seasons for Triple-A Toronto Maple Leafs.

Wilson died in Decatur, Alabama, at the age of 83.

== Sources ==
- Career statistics from Baseball Reference, or Baseball Reference (Minors), or Retrosheet
