= Tom Poholsky =

American baseball player (1929–2001)

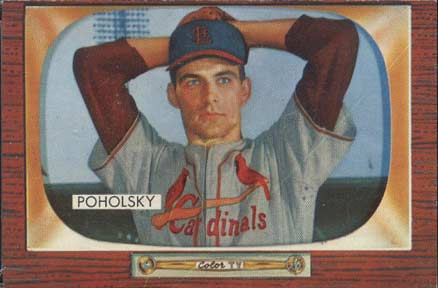
- Pitcher
- Born: August 26, 1929; Detroit, Michigan, U.S.
- Died: January 6, 2001 (aged 71); Kirkwood, Missouri, U.S.
- Batted: Right Threw: Right

MLB debut
- April 20, 1950, for the St. Louis Cardinals

Last MLB appearance
- September 11, 1957, for the Chicago Cubs

MLB statistics
- Win–loss record: 31–52
- Earned run average: 3.93
- Strikeouts: 316
- Stats at Baseball Reference

Teams
- St. Louis Cardinals (1950–1951, 1954–1956); Chicago Cubs (1957)

Thomas George Poholsky (August 26, 1929 – January 6, 2001) was an American professional baseball player, and a pitcher in Major League Baseball from 1950 to 1957.

Born in Detroit, Michigan, Poholsky appeared in 159 games, 104 as a starting pitcher, for the St. Louis Cardinals and Chicago Cubs. A right-hander, he stood 6 feet 3 inches (191 cm) tall and weighed 205 pounds (93 kg). He never had a winning season in the Majors, but had a stellar minor league baseball career, posting 16–3 and 18–6 seasons in the Cardinals' farm system and compiling an overall minor league record of 80–54 (.597). As a minor leaguer with the Rochester Red Wings, he won the International League Most Valuable Player Award in 1950.

== Pro career ==
During World War II, many of the minor leagues in America shut down, and the major leagues itself was full of career minor league players and cast offs, many of whom were for one reason or another 4F. The minor leagues that did stay in operation had to find players anyway they could. Because of this, Tom Poholsky made his professional debut for the Durham Bulls of the class C Carolina League at the age of 15. Though the team, led by career minor league player Pat Patterson, finished with a 59–77 record, Poholsky fashioned a respectable 5–3 record while appearing in 17 games, finishing fourth on the team in wins.

The next season, Poholsky spilt time between Durham and the Milford Red Sox of the East Shore League. Both Durham and Milford were part of the minor league chain of the Boston Red Sox. At the age of seventeen, Poholsky was released by the Red Sox. The year was 1947 and once again, the minor leagues were becoming full of players returning home from the war. Poholsky signed with the St. Louis Cardinals, who assigned him to Columbus of the South Atlantic League, which at times was called the Sally League. Over the course of the next two seasons, Poholsky went 37-11 combined and quickly a promotion to the top club in St Louis' chain, the Rochester Red Wings.

Over the course of the 1949 and 1950 seasons, Poholsky emerged as the ace of the staff, at one time during this tenure, he pitched in one of the longest games in baseball history. On August 13, 1950, Poholsky locked into a duel with Jersey City pitcher Andy Tomasic that lasted 22 innings, with Pholosky pitching 20 scoreless innings. Poholsky earned the win when Rochester's Don Richmond hit a Tomasic pitch that scored Dick Cole. This helped earn Poholsky a call-up to the major leagues.

The same success that Poholsky found in the minor leagues he could not replicate on the major league level, as his career was marred by double-digit losing seasons. After one final season in the minor leagues with the Houston Buffs of the American Association, Poholsky retired from baseball at the age of 29, but on the heels of a fourteen-year pro career. In 1990, Poholsky was inducted into the Rochester Red Wings hall of fame.
