= Ottawa Giants =

- Founded in 1951; Ottawa, Ontario

Minor league affiliations
- Class: AAA (1951)
- League: International League

Major league affiliations
- Team: New York Giants (1951)

Team data
- Ballpark: Lansdowne Park (1951)
- Owner/ Operator: New York Giants
- General manager: Charlie Stoneham (cousin of Horace Stoneham)
- Manager: Hugh Poland

The Ottawa Giants were a professional minor-league baseball team based in Ottawa, Ontario, Canada that operated in 1951 after the relocation of an existing Triple-A team, the Jersey City Giants. It played at Lansdowne Park in Ottawa and finished with a 62–88 record, in seventh place in the eight-team International League and 31 games in arrears of the regular season and playoff champion Montreal Royals. The Ottawa Giants drew 117,411 fans through the Lansdowne Park turnstiles, also seventh in the league.

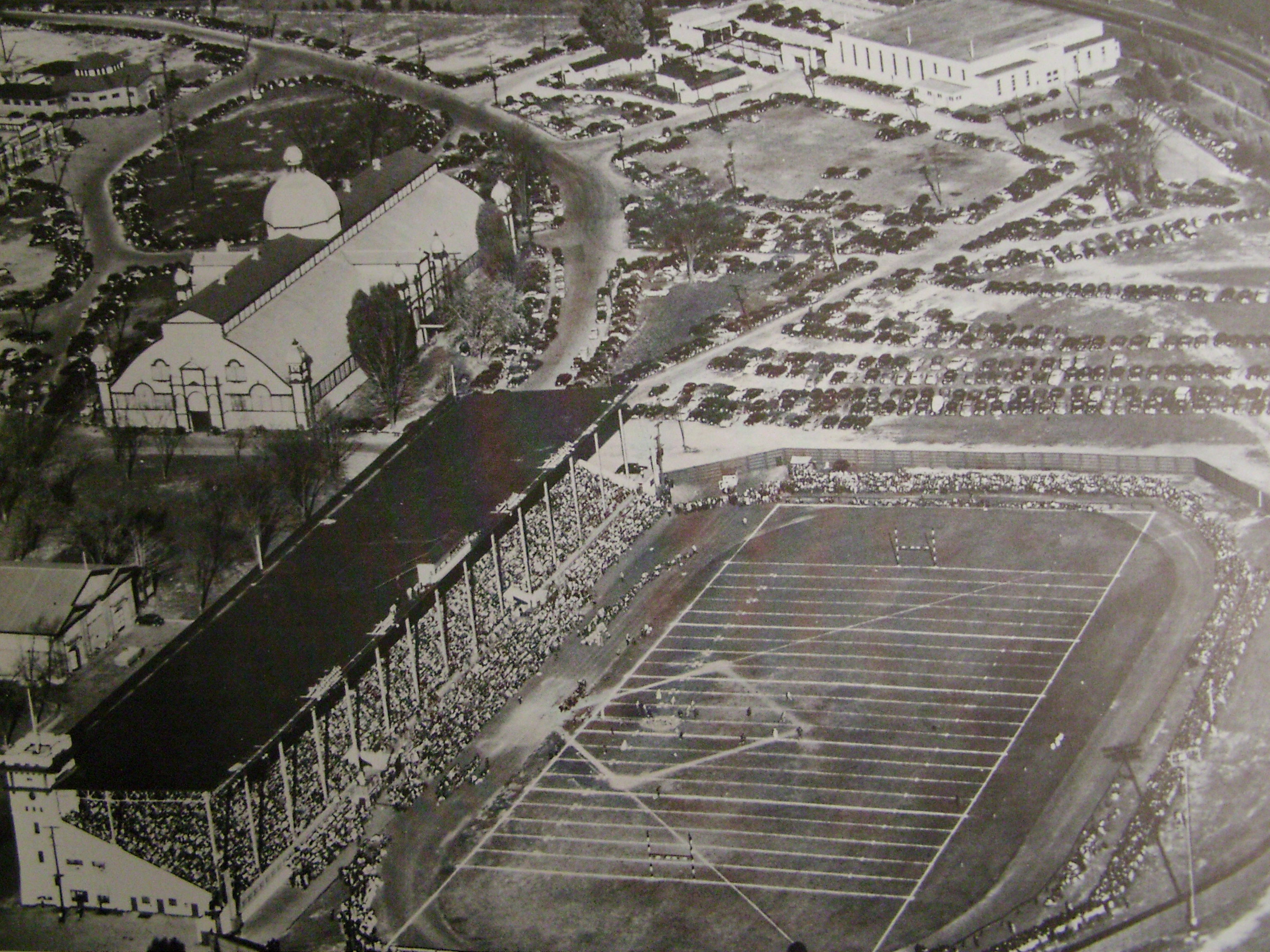
Lansdowne Park, 1950s

== History ==
As radio and television broadcasts of New York City area baseball teams increased, Jersey City's attendance plunged from 337,000 in 1947 to 63,000 in 1950. Ottawa had most recently hosted the Nationals and the Senators of the Class C Border League from 1947 to 1950, leading that league in attendance for three of its four seasons and making the playoffs each year.

The Jersey City team was owned by the New York Giants. Tommy Gorman, who held the exclusive rights to baseball at Lansdowne Park, engineered a deal to have the New Yorkers move their Jersey City team to Ottawa for the 1951 season. The Ottawa Giants and the Minneapolis Millers of the American Association were the two Triple-A farm clubs of the New York Giants in 1951. However, the parent club decided to scale back and only operate one Triple-A club in 1952. After one season, the Ottawa team was sold to the Philadelphia Athletics, who operated the team as the Ottawa Athletics from 1952 to 1954.

== Roster ==
- P George Bamberger
- OF Johnny Barrett
- P Charlie Bishop
- 1B Marv Blaylock
- P Roger Bowman
- P Pete Burnside
- 1B Lorenzo Cabrera
- P Al Corwin
- P Walter Cox
- 1B/2B/OF Piper Davis
- P Chuck Eisenmann
- P Jerry Fahr
- P Frank Fanovich
- 3B Billy Gardner
- OF Harvey Gentry
- 1B/OF Fred Gerken
- P Red Hardy
- P George Heller
- 2B Bobby Hofman
- SS Ziggy Jasinski
- OF Milt Joffe
- OF Stan Jok
- OF Pete Karpuk
- P Alex Konikowski
- P Dick Libby
- P Raúl López (Cuban)
- OF Paul Mauldin
- OF Dutch Mele
- OF John Metkovich
- 2B William Metzig
- P Harry Nicholas
- C Edward Sokol
- P Andy Tomasic
- C Pat Tomkinson
- 2B/SS Mylon Vukemire
- C Neal Watlington
- IF Artie Wilson
- P Ed Wright
