= Don Richmond =

American baseball player (1919–1981)

- Third baseman
- Born: October 27, 1919; Gillett, Pennsylvania, U.S.
- Died: May 24, 1981 (aged 61); Elmira, New York, U.S.
- Batted: Left Threw: Right

MLB debut
- September 16, 1941, for the Philadelphia Athletics

Last MLB appearance
- May 13, 1951, for the St. Louis Cardinals

MLB statistics
- Batting average: .211
- Home runs: 2
- Runs batted in: 22
- Stats at Baseball Reference

Teams
- Philadelphia Athletics (1941, 1946–1947); St. Louis Cardinals (1951)

Donald Lester Richmond (October 27, 1919 – May 24, 1981) was an American professional baseball third baseman.

== Minor leagues ==
Richmond began his playing career in 1940, but it was interrupted for four years due to World War II. He won the International League batting crown in 1950 and 1951 while playing for the Rochester Red Wings, posting an amazing .350 average in 1951.

Richmond served as player-manager for the Batavia Indians in 1959.

Richmond was elected to the Rochester Red Wings Hall of Fame in 1990, and to the International League Hall of Fame in 2013.

== Major leagues ==
Richmond played in the major leagues over parts of four seasons (1941, 1946–47, 1951) with the Philadelphia Athletics and St. Louis Cardinals. For his career, he compiled a .211 batting average in 152 at-bats, with two home runs and 22 runs batted in.

== Personal life ==
Richmond was born in Gillett, Pennsylvania and died in Elmira, New York at the age of 61.
