= Mal Mallette =

American baseball player (1922-2005)

- Pitcher
- Born: January 30, 1922; Syracuse, New York
- Died: November 25, 2005 (aged 83); Durham, North Carolina
- Batted: Left Threw: Left

MLB debut
- September 25, 1950, for the Brooklyn Dodgers

Last MLB appearance
- September 29, 1950, for the Brooklyn Dodgers

MLB statistics
- Record: 0–0
- Earned run average: 0.00
- Strikeouts: 2
- Stats at Baseball Reference

Teams
- Brooklyn Dodgers (1950)

Malcolm Francis Mallette (January 30, 1922 in Syracuse, New York – November 25, 2005) was a pitcher in Major League Baseball. He pitched in two games for the Brooklyn Dodgers in 1950.

He worked as a sportswriter after retiring, becoming a director of the American Press Institute and was inducted into the N.C. Journalism Hall of Fame.
