= Alex Konikowski =

American baseball player (1928-1997)

- Pitcher
- Born: June 8, 1928; Throop, Pennsylvania, U.S.
- Died: September 27, 1997 (aged 69); Seymour, Connecticut, U.S.
- Batted: Right Threw: Right

MLB debut
- June 16, 1948, for the New York Giants

Last MLB appearance
- July 29, 1954, for the New York Giants

MLB statistics
- Win–loss record: 2–3
- Earned run average: 6.93
- Innings pitched: 49 1/3
- Stats at Baseball Reference

Teams
- New York Giants (1948; 1951; 1954)

Alexander James Konikowski (June 8, 1928 – September 27, 1997) was an American professional baseball player, a right-handed pitcher who appeared in 35 games played for the New York Giants of Major League Baseball over three seasons (1948; 1951; 1954). Born in Throop, Pennsylvania, Konikowski stood 6 feet 1 inch (1.85 m) tall and weighed 187 pounds (85 kg).

Konikowski signed his first professional contract at the age of 16 during World War II, and spent all but 11 games of his 310-game minor league career (1944–1951; 1954–1956) in the Giants' farm system. He debuted with the Giants in June 1948 as a relief pitcher and received his only MLB starting assignment on the season's final day, allowing eight runs in 2 2/3 innings against the National League champion Boston Braves. The 1948 campaign was Konikowski's busiest MLB season, as he appeared in 22 games and pitched in 33 1/3 innings and collected all five decisions that year. He was credited with his only big league save that season, on July 31, as he preserved a 14–9 win for Larry Jansen against the Chicago Cubs.

Although he appeared in only three Major League games in 1951 and ten more in 1954, those were important years for the Giants, as they captured the NL pennant each season. Konikowski was recalled from the Triple-A Ottawa Giants in September 1951 and hurled four scoreless innings in three late-season games — all rare Giant losses during their famous surge that forced a three-game championship playoff with their archrivals, the Brooklyn Dodgers. He also pitched a scoreless ninth inning in Game 5 of the 1951 World Series, a 13–1 Giant defeat, although one out was recorded when the New York Yankees' Gene Woodling tried to stretch a triple into an inside-the-park home run.

Konikowski missed 1952 and 1953 while serving in the military during the Korean War. Then, in the midseason of 1954, he worked in ten games for the Giants as a reliever and was largely effective, until he was treated roughly in a July 18 outing against the Cincinnati Redlegs. He got into only one more MLB game before finishing his career in the minors.

As a Major Leaguer, Konikowski allowed 58 hits and 29 bases on balls in 49 1/3 innings of work, with 20 strikeouts.
