= Gillett, Pennsylvania =

Unincorporated community in Pennsylvania, US

- Unincorporated community
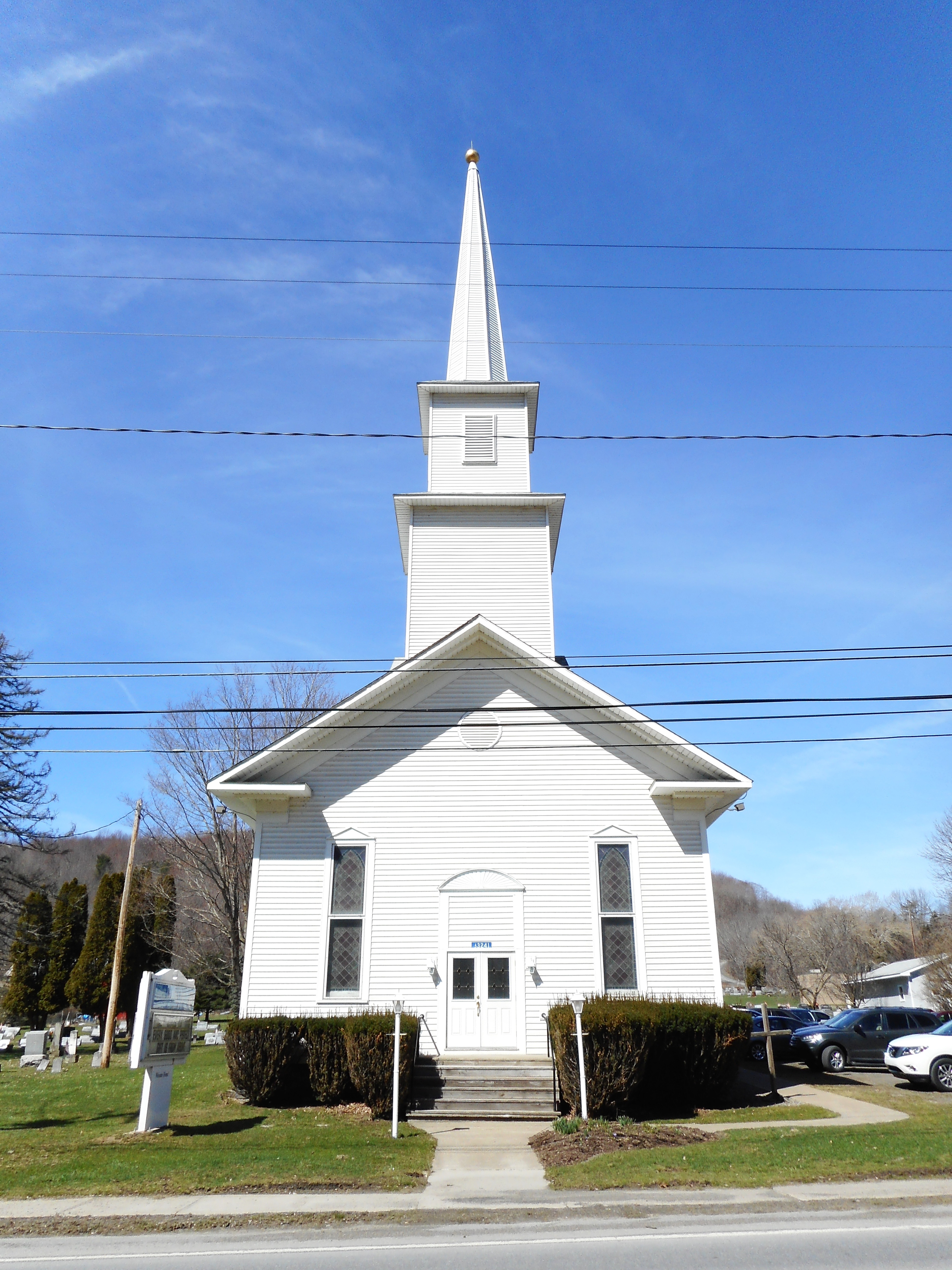
- The Gillett Baptist Church

- Location within Pennsylvania
- Coordinates: 41°57′04″N 76°47′40″W
- Country: United States
- State: Pennsylvania
- County: Bradford
- Elevation: 1,155 ft (352 m)

Population (2010)
  - Total: 3,272
- Time zone: UTC-5 (Eastern (EST))
  - Summer (DST): UTC-4 (EDT)
- ZIP code: 16925
- Area codes: 272 & 570
- GNIS feature ID: 1175617

Gillett is an unincorporated community in Bradford County, Pennsylvania, United States. The community is located along Pennsylvania Route 14, 9.6 miles (15.4 km) south of Elmira, New York. Gillett has a post office with ZIP code 16925.
