= Austin Knickerbocker =

American baseball player (1918-1997)

- Outfielder
- Born: October 15, 1918; Bangall, New York, U.S.
- Died: February 18, 1997 (aged 78); Clinton Corners, New York, U.S.
- Batted: Right Threw: Right

MLB debut
- April 19, 1947, for the Philadelphia Athletics

Last MLB appearance
- September 28, 1947, for the Philadelphia Athletics

MLB statistics
- Batting average: .250
- Home runs: 0
- Runs batted in: 2
- Stats at Baseball Reference

Teams
- Philadelphia Athletics (1947)

Austin Jay Knickerbocker (October 15, 1918 – February 18, 1997) was an American professional baseball player whose 11-season career included 21 Major League games played for the Philadelphia Athletics during the 1947 season. An outfielder, he threw and batted right-handed, stood 5 feet 11 inches (1.80 m) tall and weighed 185 pounds (84 kg).

== Career ==
Born in Bangall, a hamlet of Stanford, New York, Knickerbocker attended Duke University and began his professional career at age 21 in 1940. In 1941, he batted .406 to lead the Class C Canadian–American League in hitting; he also paced the circuit in hits (202) and runs batted in (135), as a member of the Oneonta Indians. (However, Leon Riley of the Rome Colonels led the league in home runs that season.) The performance earned Knickerbocker a promotion all the way to the top level of the minors, with the 1942 Jersey City Giants, but he played only 30 games that season, then spent 1943–1945 serving in the United States Army during World War II.

He resumed his playing career in the International League in 1946 and the following year made his only Major League appearances. In his April 19, 1947, debut for the Athletics, he was a pinch runner against the Boston Red Sox, and mostly languished on the bench in the early weeks of the campaign, getting only five at bats before the May cutdown date, when he was optioned to the Triple-A Toronto Maple Leafs. After batting .278 in 105 games for Toronto that season, he was recalled by Philadelphia in September and started eight games, playing all three outfield positions through season's end. He resumed his minor league career in 1948 and played through 1954, with the exception of the 1952 season.

In 48 Major League at bats, Knickerbocker registered 12 hits, including three doubles and two triples. He scored eight runs in his 21 games.
