= George Puccinelli =

American baseball player (1907–1956)

- Outfielder
- Born: June 22, 1907; San Francisco, California, U.S.
- Died: April 16, 1956 (aged 48); San Francisco, California, U.S.
- Batted: Right Threw: Right

MLB debut
- July 17, 1930, for the St. Louis Cardinals

Last MLB appearance
- September 27, 1936, for the Philadelphia Athletics

MLB statistics
- Batting average: .283
- Home runs: 19
- Runs batted in: 102
- Stats at Baseball Reference

Teams
- St. Louis Cardinals (1930, 1932); St. Louis Browns (1934); Philadelphia Athletics (1936)

George Lawrence Puccinelli (June 22, 1907 – April 16, 1956) was an American outfielder in Major League Baseball. He played for the St. Louis Cardinals, St. Louis Browns, and Philadelphia Athletics.

In 187 games over four seasons, Puccinelli posted a .283 batting average (172-for-607) with 109 runs, 19 home runs, 102 RBI and 78 bases on balls. He recorded a .947 fielding percentage playing at right and left field.

On April 16, 1956, at age 48, he suffered a fatal heart attack while playing golf.
