= Buzz Arlett =

American baseball player (1899-1964)

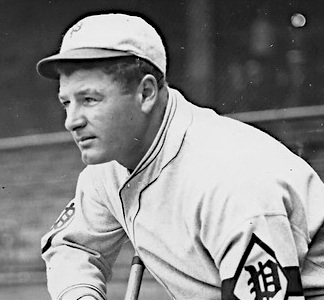
- Arlett in 1931 as a member of the Philadelphia Phillies.
- Outfielder / Pitcher
- Born: January 3, 1899; Elmhurst, California, U.S.
- Died: May 16, 1964 (aged 65); Minneapolis, Minnesota, U.S.
- Batted: Switch Threw: Right

Professional debut
- Minor league: 1918, for the Oakland Oaks
- MLB: April 14, 1931, for the Philadelphia Phillies

Last appearance
- MLB: September 27, 1931, for the Philadelphia Phillies
- Minor league: 1937, for the Syracuse Chiefs

Minor league statistics
- Batting average: .341
- Home runs: 432
- Runs batted in: 1786
- Win–loss record: 108–93
- Earned run average: 3.39
- Strikeouts: 513

MLB statistics
- Batting average: .313
- Home runs: 18
- Runs batted in: 72
- Stats at Baseball Reference

Teams
- Minor league: Oakland Oaks (1918–1930); Baltimore Orioles (1932–1933); Birmingham Barons (1934); Minneapolis Millers (1934–1936); Syracuse Chiefs (1937); Major league: Philadelphia Phillies (1931)

Career highlights and awards
- Hit four home runs in one game twice (June 2, 1932; July 4, 1932)

Russell Loris "Buzz" Arlett (January 3, 1899 – May 16, 1964), was an American professional baseball player, sometimes called "the Babe Ruth of the minor leagues." Arlett began his career as a pitcher with the Oakland Oaks until an arm injury caused him to move to the outfield, where he became a dominant home run hitter. He was for many decades the all-time home run leader in the minor leagues. His record would not be broken in North America until being surpassed by Héctor Espino of the Mexican League in 1977, or in the United States until Mike Hessman passed him in 2015. In 1984, the Society for American Baseball Research voted Arlett the most outstanding player in the history of minor league baseball.

== Early life ==
Arlett was the youngest of four sons (Al, Harry, Dick, and Russell) born to German immigrant Beny and his English wife Lillian. He also had a sister Evelyn. During their youth, the Arlett brothers would often play baseball from sunrise till sundown.

== Professional career ==
In 1918, Arlett began his professional career by joining his brother Al on the pitching staff of the Oakland Oaks of the Pacific Coast League. He received his nickname "Buzz" because he was known to cut through opposing batters like a buzz saw. He won 108 games as a pitcher.

In 1923, Arlett became a full-time outfielder. As a batter, Arlett was the best slugger of the Pacific Coast League, often leading the league in batting statistics and setting several records. In his 13 years in the PCL, Arlett set league records with 251 home runs and 1135 runs batted in (RBIs).

In 1929 (considered to be his best season as a batter), Arlett hit 39 home runs, earned a .374 batting average and drove in 189 runs. He played only for the Oakland Oaks through the 1930 season.

On January 26, 1931, the Philadelphia Phillies purchased Arlett's contract from Oakland. Already 32 years old, Arlett had an impressive season with Philadelphia as a hitter but was regarded as a poor fielder. Although Arlett began his career at about 185 pounds, he had gained approximately 50 pounds during his career and had become a sluggish fielder. He was used in 94 games as an outfielder and only 13 as a first baseman. Although he compiled a .313 batting average and hit 18 home runs — fourth in the National League — his lackluster fielding led the Phillies to use him as a pinch-hitter for much of the season.

In 1932, Philadelphia sold Arlett's contract to the Baltimore Orioles of the International League. On June 2, 1932, he hit four home runs for the Orioles against the Reading Keystones in a 14–13 win. He repeated the feat on July 4, 1932, again against Reading, in a 21–10 blowout win by the Orioles. He led the league that year with 54 home runs and 144 runs batted in. Arlett's record of 54 home runs in 1932 is the second-highest annual total in International League history, and through the 2003 season no International League batter has equalled or surpassed Arlett's 54 home runs.

In 1933, Arlett led the league again with 39 home runs for the Orioles. In 1934, Arlett started the season with the Birmingham Barons, but was soon after purchased by the Minneapolis Millers of the American Association. During his season with the Millers, he hit 41 home runs that year with 132 runs batted in and earned a .319 batting average.

In 1935, he raised his batting average to .360, hitting 25 home runs and driving in 101 runs. In 1936, Arlett hit .316, but was limited to 193 at bats. In 1937, Arlett played briefly for the Syracuse Chiefs, but then retired. He returned to Minneapolis to settle with his family.

Arlett finished his career as the all-time minor league home run and RBI leader with career totals of 432 home runs and 1786 runs batted in. He now ranks second in both categories among all minor-league players. (He was surpassed by Héctor Espino for home runs and Nick Cullop for RBIs.) In his career as a minor-league player, Arlett earned a .341 batting average and a .604 slugging percentage. Arlett retired with a 108–93 record and a 3.42 earned run average as a minor-league pitcher.

== Personal life ==
In 1927, Arlett married his first wife, Frances. They separated in 1932 and divorced in 1936. They had no children. In court papers, Arlett listed "desertion" as the cause for divorce. In 1936, Arlett married Vivian Johnson, who was secretary to Minneapolis Millers owner Mike Kelley. They had a son and a daughter.

After retiring from baseball, Arlett owned and operated a successful restaurant and bar in Minneapolis called Arlett's Place. Arlett's Place sponsored its own baseball team where Arlett participated as a player until the early 1940s.

== Death and legacy ==
On May 16, 1964, Arlett died of a heart attack in Minneapolis and was interred at Lakewood Cemetery. He was survived by his wife, son, daughter, and his older brothers Harry and Dick.

Arlett was inducted into the Pacific Coast League Hall of Fame in 1945. In 1984, the Society for American Baseball Research voted Arlett the most outstanding player in the history of minor league baseball.

In Harry Turtledove's 2011 alternate history short story "The House that George Built," Buzz Arlett instead achieves Babe Ruth's storied career since Ruth's career was derailed by mismanagement of his contract.
