= Steve Lembo =

American baseball player

- Catcher
- Born: November 13, 1926; Brooklyn, New York
- Died: December 4, 1989 (aged 63); Flushing, Queens, New York
- Batted: Right Threw: Right

MLB debut
- September 16, 1950, for the Brooklyn Dodgers

Last MLB appearance
- September 27, 1952, for the Brooklyn Dodgers

MLB statistics
- Batting average: .182
- Home runs: 0
- Runs batted in: 1
- Stats at Baseball Reference

Teams
- Brooklyn Dodgers (1950, 1952)

Stephen Neal Lembo (November 13, 1926 – December 4, 1989) was an American catcher in Major League Baseball. Born in Brooklyn, New York, he played seven games for the Brooklyn Dodgers during the 1950 and 1952 baseball seasons. He was also with the Dodgers late in the 1951 season, and though he did not appear in any games, he was a bullpen catcher warming up Carl Erskine and Ralph Branca in the deciding National League playoff game against the New York Giants that was ended by Bobby Thomson's "Shot Heard 'Round the World" (as revealed by author Joshua Prager in his book The Echoing Green).

After retiring as a ballplayer in 1954, Lembo became a scout for the Dodgers, serving in that role until his death. He died at age 63 in Flushing, Queens.
