= Jim Prendergast =

American baseball player (1917-1994)

- Pitcher
- Born: August 23, 1917; Brooklyn, New York, U.S.
- Died: August 23, 1994 (aged 77); Amherst, New York, U.S.
- Batted: Left Threw: Left

MLB debut
- April 25, 1948, for the Boston Braves

Last MLB appearance
- June 29, 1948, for the Boston Braves

MLB statistics
- Win–loss record: 1–1
- Earned run average: 10.26
- Strikeouts: 3
- Stats at Baseball Reference

Teams
- Boston Braves (1948)

James Bartholomew Prendergast (August 23, 1917 – August 23, 1994) was an American professional baseball player. He was a left-handed pitcher for one season (1948) in the major leagues, with the Boston Braves. Prendergast was born in Brooklyn, New York and died in Amherst, New York at the age of 77.

== Career ==
Prendergast started his professional career at the age of 18, in the Pennsylvania State Association. He bounced around the minor leagues for a few years before pitching 1939–1941 in Southern Association. He spent the following four years serving in the United States Army.

Prendergast returned to baseball in 1946 with the Syracuse Chiefs of the International League; in 1947, he had the best season of his career, going 20–15 with a 3.08 earned run average. Prendergast joined the Braves in early 1948. However, he did not pitch well and was released in mid-season. He compiled a major league record of 1–1, with a 10.26 earned run average and 3 strikeouts in 16 2/3 innings pitched.

Prendergast's pitching declined after 1948. In 1951, he sued Major League Baseball for $150,000 to test the legality of the reserve clause. He never played professionally again.
