= Bobby Morgan (baseball) =

American baseball player (1926–2023)

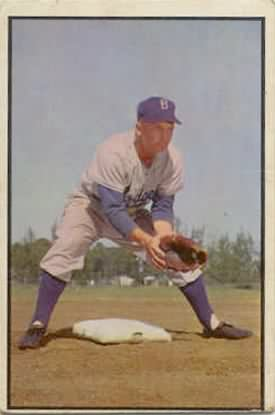
- Infielder
- Born: June 29, 1926; Oklahoma City, Oklahoma, U.S.
- Died: June 1, 2023 (aged 96); Oklahoma City, Oklahoma, U.S.
- Batted: Right Threw: Right

MLB debut
- April 18, 1950, for the Brooklyn Dodgers

Last MLB appearance
- April 20, 1958, for the Chicago Cubs

MLB statistics
- Batting average: .233
- Home runs: 53
- Runs batted in: 217
- Stats at Baseball Reference

Teams
- Brooklyn Dodgers (1950, 1952–1953); Philadelphia Phillies (1954–1956); St. Louis Cardinals (1956); Philadelphia Phillies (1957); Chicago Cubs (1957–1958)

Robert Morris Morgan (June 29, 1926 – June 1, 2023) was an American professional baseball infielder. He played eight seasons in Major League Baseball (MLB) between 1950 and 1958 for the Brooklyn Dodgers, Philadelphia Phillies, St. Louis Cardinals, and Chicago Cubs.

== Early life ==
Born in Oklahoma City, Oklahoma, Morgan played American Legion baseball on the same team as Roy Jarvis and Cal McLish, winning the Oklahoma state championship in 1943. He graduated from Classen High School in 1944.

== Playing career ==
Morgan began his professional career after he graduated from Classen in 1944, signing with the Brooklyn Dodgers. While at spring training in 1944, Morgan was drafted to fight in World War II, where he served in the European Theater of Operations. In 1949, he was named the most valuable player of the Triple-A International League That year, he won the league batting crown (.337) and collected 112 runs batted in (RBIs) with the Montreal Royals.

Morgan's days with the Dodgers were spent as a utility infielder, playing behind Hall of Famers Pee Wee Reese and Jackie Robinson, All-Star Gil Hodges, 1953 Rookie of the Year Jim Gilliam, and slick-fielding Billy Cox. He played in three World Series games for the Dodgers. In the 1952 series he was a defensive replacement in Game 4, and lined out as a pinch hitter in the ninth inning of Game 7 against Bob Kuzava of the New York Yankees. In the 1953 World Series, he again lined out as a pinch hitter, in the seventh inning of Game 6.

Traded to the Phillies in March 1954 for Dick Young, Morgan set personal bests in hits (119), doubles, home runs (14), RBIs (50) and batting average (.262) as the Phillies' starting shortstop in 1954, where he displaced veteran former "Whiz Kid" Granny Hamner. The following year, Morgan moved to second base, but slumped at the plate.

In May 1956, the Phillies traded Morgan to the St. Louis Cardinals for Solly Hemus. After the 1956 season, the Cardinals traded Morgan and Rip Repulski to the Phillies for Del Ennis. The Chicago Cubs purchased Morgan from the Phillies in May 1957.

Overall, as a big leaguer, Morgan collected 487 hits, with 96 doubles, 11 triples, and 53 home runs. He batted .233. Morgan's playing career continued in the minor leagues through 1963.

== Later life ==
Morgan managed for three seasons (1964–66) in the Phillies farm system and scouted for the Baltimore Orioles, Kansas City Royals, and Minnesota Twins.

Morgan died in Oklahoma City on June 1, 2023, at the age of 96.
