= Jack Banta (baseball) =

American baseball player (1925–2006)

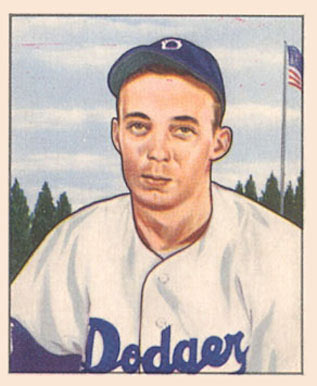
- Pitcher
- Born: June 24, 1925; Hutchinson, Kansas, U.S.
- Died: September 17, 2006 (aged 81); Hutchinson, Kansas, U.S.
- Batted: Left Threw: Right

MLB debut
- September 18, 1947, for the Brooklyn Dodgers

Last MLB appearance
- June 21, 1950, for the Brooklyn Dodgers

MLB statistics
- Win–loss record: 14–12
- Earned run average: 3.78
- Strikeouts: 116
- Stats at Baseball Reference

Teams
- Brooklyn Dodgers (1947–1950)

Jackie Kay Banta (June 24, 1925 – September 17, 2006) was an American professional baseball pitcher who appeared in 69 games in Major League Baseball for the Brooklyn Dodgers between 1947 and 1950. The native of Hutchinson, Kansas, threw right-handed and batted left-handed; he stood 6 feet 2 inches (1.88 m) tall and weighed 175 pounds (79 kg).

Banta's professional career, spent entirely in the Brooklyn organization, began in 1944. His only full MLB season occurred in 1949, when he worked in 48 games, with 12 starts, won ten of 16 decisions, and posted his only career shutout. Among his victories was the October 2 game that clinched the 1949 National League pennant for the Dodgers. On the regular season's closing day, against the Philadelphia Phillies at Shibe Park, Banta hurled 41/3 innings of two-hit, scoreless relief, preserving a 7–7 tie and enabling Brooklyn to win the contest in the top half of the tenth inning, 9–7, to outlast the second-place St. Louis Cardinals by a single game. He then appeared in relief in Games 3, 4 and 5 of the 1949 World Series against the New York Yankees, won by the Bombers in five games.

A shoulder injury suffered in 1950 curtailed Banta's MLB and professional career. Brooklyn demoted him to the minor leagues after a series of rough outings from May 30 to June 21, and he ended his active pitching career in 1952. In 69 major-league games, he posted a 14–12 won–lost record and a 3.78 earned run average, with three complete games in 19 starts and five saves. In 2042/3 innings pitched, he allowed 176 hits and 113 bases on balls, and struck out 116. In his lone World Series, in 1949, he posted a 0–0 (3.18) record in three games, permitting two earned runs, five hits, and one base on balls, and recording four strikeouts, in 52/3 innings.
