= Howie Moss =

American baseball player (1919–1989)

- Outfielder / Third baseman
- Born: October 17, 1919; Gastonia, North Carolina, U.S.
- Died: May 7, 1989 (aged 69); Baltimore, Maryland, U.S.
- Batted: Right Threw: Right

MLB debut
- April 14, 1942, for the New York Giants

Last MLB appearance
- September 29, 1946, for the Cleveland Indians

MLB statistics
- Batting average: .097
- Home runs: 0
- Runs batted in: 1
- Stats at Baseball Reference

Teams
- New York Giants (1942); Cincinnati Reds (1946); Cleveland Indians (1946)

Howard Glenn Moss (October 17, 1919 – May 7, 1989) was an American professional baseball player, an outfielder and third baseman who was a prodigious home run hitter in minor league baseball but who struggled in three Major League trials during the 1940s. Listed at 5 feet, 11 1/2 inches (1.82 m) tall and 185 pounds (84 kg), Moss batted and threw right-handed. He was born in Gastonia, North Carolina.

Moss, nicknamed "Howitzer", built his legacy as one of the most feared sluggers of the International League in the 1940s. In 1944, his batting prowess drove the Baltimore Orioles to the Governors' Cup championship title after he led the league hitters with 27 home runs, 141 RBI and 178 hits, while batting .306 with 122 runs and a .549 slugging percentage. For his heroics, he received the IL Most Valuable Player Award.

In 1945, Moss served for one year for the United States Coast Guard during World War II. After being discharged from service, he regained the IL home-run crown and held it for three consecutive seasons, hitting 38 blasts in 1946, 53 in 1947, and 33 in 1948. His single-season home run mark of 53 has not been reached since then in the International League. He also is the only player in IL history to lead the circuit in home runs four times. In 1960, Moss was inducted into the International League Hall of Fame.

Moss endured three failed Major League tryouts. He was held hitless in 14 at bats in his first MLB audition in 1942 for the New York Giants. Then, in 1946, playing for the Cincinnati Reds, he extended his hitless skein to 22 at bats by going 0–for–8 before collecting three singles in four at-bats on April 24 against ace St. Louis Cardinals left-hander Howie Pollet. Returned to the minor-league Orioles in May, he played in 130 games for Baltimore, then was called up by the parent Cleveland Indians in September. Moss started eight games for Cleveland but could only muster two hits in 32 at-bats (.063).

Altogether, in 22 Major League games, 75 plate appearances and 72 at-bats, Moss garnered only seven hits, none for extra bases, with 17 strikeouts, three bases on balls, and one run batted in, batting .097.

Moss died in Baltimore, Maryland, at the age of 69.
