= Greg Mulleavy =

American baseball player (1905–1980)

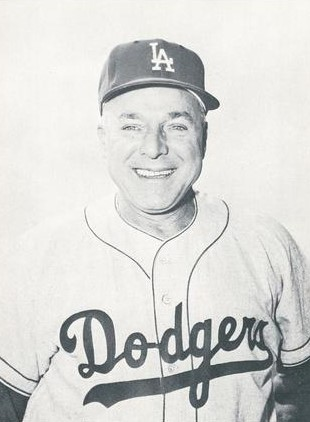
- Shortstop
- Born: September 25, 1905; Detroit, Michigan, U.S.
- Died: February 1, 1980 (aged 74); Arcadia, California, U.S.
- Batted: Right Threw: Right

MLB debut
- July 4, 1930, for the Chicago White Sox

Last MLB appearance
- April 13, 1933, for the Boston Red Sox

MLB statistics
- Batting average: .260
- Home runs: 0
- Runs batted in: 28
- Stats at Baseball Reference

Teams
- As player: Chicago White Sox (1930, 1932); Boston Red Sox (1933); As coach: Brooklyn / Los Angeles Dodgers (1957–1960, 1962–1964)

Career highlights and awards
- 2× World Series champion (1959, 1963)

Gregory Thomas "Moe" Mulleavy (September 25, 1905 – February 1, 1980) was an American professional baseball shortstop, manager, coach, and scout.

Born in Detroit, Michigan, his father, Thomas, was a machinist in a Detroit automobile factory, having moved from Canada to the United States in 1903 with his wife, Bertha (Freytag) Mulleavy. Gregory was born on September 25, 1905, their elder child. A daughter, Eleanor, was later born. He attended the University of Detroit Jesuit High School and Academy prior to beginning his baseball career in 1927.

== Playing career ==
Mulleavy threw and batted right-handed, stood 5 feet 9 inches (1.75 m) tall and weighed 167 pounds (76 kg). He played 79 games in Major League Baseball (MLB) for the Chicago White Sox and Boston Red Sox. His 76 big-league hits included 14 doubles and five triples. Mulleavy's minor league playing career lasted 20 seasons (1927–46), the last six as a playing manager.

== Coach and manager ==
He joined the Brooklyn Dodgers organization in 1946 and became a longtime member of the Dodger system in both Brooklyn and Los Angeles. Mulleavy managed the Triple-A Montreal Royals for the full seasons of 1955–56 and through the mid-season of 1957. On June 14, he was reassigned to the Major League coaching staff of the Brooklyn Dodgers, and he remained as an aide to Walter Alston after the franchise moved West (1958–60; 1962–64). He served on two world champions for Los Angeles (1959; 1963). Mulleavy was a scout for the Dodgers from 1950 to 1954, in 1961, and from 1965 until his death in 1980.

== Family ==
He married Doris Giroux in 1932. In 1939, their son Greg Mullavey (Gregory Thomas Mulleavy Jr.), who became an actor, was born. and is best known for his leading role in the TV sitcom Mary Hartman, Mary Hartman. He changed the spelling of his surname so as not to be confused with his father.
