= 1939 International League season =

- League: International League
- Sport: Baseball
- Duration: April 20 – September 10
- Games: 154
- Teams: 8

Regular season
- Season MVP: Mickey Witek, Newark Bears

Governors' Cup Playoffs
- League champions: Rochester Red Wings
- Runners-up: Newark Bears

IL seasons
- ← 1938 1940 →

The 1939 International League was a Class AA baseball season played between April 20 and September 10. Eight teams played a 154-game schedule, with the top four teams qualifying for the post-season.

The Rochester Red Wings won the Governors' Cup, defeating the Newark Bears in the final round of the playoffs.

== Team changes ==
- The Buffalo Bisons become an affiliate for the Cleveland Indians.
- The Montreal Royals end their affiliation with the Pittsburgh Pirates and become an affiliate for the Brooklyn Dodgers.
- The Syracuse Chiefs end their affiliation with the Cincinnati Reds.

== Teams ==
1939 International League
Team	City	MLB Affiliate	Stadium
Baltimore Orioles	Baltimore, Maryland	None	Oriole Park
Buffalo Bisons	Buffalo, New York	Cleveland Indians	Offermann Stadium
Jersey City Giants	Jersey City, New Jersey	New York Giants	Roosevelt Stadium
Montreal Royals	Montreal, Quebec	Brooklyn Dodgers	Delorimier Stadium
Newark Bears	Newark, New Jersey	New York Yankees	Ruppert Stadium
Rochester Red Wings	Rochester, New York	St. Louis Cardinals	Red Wing Stadium
Syracuse Chiefs	Syracuse, New York	None	Municipal Stadium
Toronto Maple Leafs	Toronto, Ontario	None	Maple Leaf Stadium

== Map of teams ==
International League teams

== Regular season ==
=== Summary ===
- The Jersey City Giants finished with the best record in the regular season for the first time in team history.
- The Newark Bears defeated the Syracuse Chiefs in a tie-breaker game to qualify for the post-season.

=== Standings ===
International League
Team	Win	Loss	%	GB
Jersey City Giants	89	64	.582	–
Rochester Red Wings	84	67	.556	4
Buffalo Bisons	82	72	.532	7.5
Newark Bears	82	73	.529	8
Syracuse Chiefs	81	74	.523	9
Baltimore Orioles	68	85	.444	21
Montreal Royals	64	88	.421	24.5
Toronto Maple Leafs	63	90	.412	26

== League Leaders ==
=== Batting leaders ===
Stat	Player	Total
AVG	Johnny Dickshot, Jersey City Giants	.356
H	Mickey Witek, Newark Bears	204
R	Johnnie Tyler, Buffalo Bisons	124
2B	Dusty Cooke, Rochester Red Wings	42
3B	Johnny Dickshot, Jersey City Giants	16
HR	Ollie Carnegie, Buffalo Bisons	29
RBI	Ollie Carnegie, Buffalo Bisons	112
SB	Ed Levy, Newark Bears	22

=== Pitching leaders ===
Stat	Player	Total
W	Si Johnson, Rochester Red Wings	22
L	Earl Caldwell, Toronto Maple Leafs; Kemp Wicker, Montreal Royals	18
ERA	Roy Joiner, Jersey City Giants	2.53
CG	Mike Ryba, Rochester Red Wings	25
SO	Ted Kleinhans, Syracuse Chiefs	138
IP	Ted Kleinhans, Syracuse Chiefs	253.0

== Playoffs ==
- The Rochester Red Wings won their first Governors' Cup, defeating the Newark Bears in seven games.

=== Playoff bracket ===
Semi-finals
1	Jersey City	2
4	Newark	4
2	Rochester	4
3	Buffalo	1

Governors' Cup
4	Newark	3
2	Rochester	4

== See also ==
- 1939 Major League Baseball season
