= 1938 International League season =

- League: International League
- Sport: Baseball
- Duration: April 21 – September 11
- Games: 154
- Teams: 8

Regular season
- Season MVP: Ollie Carnegie, Buffalo Bisons

Governors' Cup Playoffs
- League champions: Newark Bears
- Runners-up: Buffalo Bisons

IL seasons
- ← 1937 1939 →

The 1938 International League was a Class AA baseball season played between April 21 and September 11. Eight teams played a 154-game schedule, with the top four teams qualifying for the post-season.

The Newark Bears won the Governors' Cup, defeating the Buffalo Bisons in the final round of the playoffs.

== Teams ==
1938 International League
Team	City	MLB Affiliate	Stadium
Baltimore Orioles	Baltimore, Maryland	None	Oriole Park
Buffalo Bisons	Buffalo, New York	None	Offermann Stadium
Jersey City Giants	Jersey City, New Jersey	New York Giants	Roosevelt Stadium
Montreal Royals	Montreal, Quebec	Pittsburgh Pirates	Delorimier Stadium
Newark Bears	Newark, New Jersey	New York Yankees	Ruppert Stadium
Rochester Red Wings	Rochester, New York	St. Louis Cardinals	Red Wing Stadium
Syracuse Chiefs	Syracuse, New York	Cincinnati Reds	Municipal Stadium
Toronto Maple Leafs	Toronto, Ontario	None	Maple Leaf Stadium

== Map of teams ==
International League teams

== Regular season ==
=== Summary ===
- The Newark Bears finished with the best record in the regular season for the second consecutive season.

=== Standings ===
International League
Team	Win	Loss	%	GB
Newark Bears	104	48	.684	–
Syracuse Chiefs	87	67	.565	18
Rochester Red Wings	80	74	.519	25
Buffalo Bisons	79	74	.516	25.5
Toronto Maple Leafs	72	81	.471	32.5
Montreal Royals	69	84	.451	35.5
Jersey City Giants	68	85	.444	36.5
Baltimore Orioles	52	98	.347	51

== League Leaders ==
=== Batting leaders ===
Stat	Player	Total
AVG	Charlie Keller, Newark Bears	.365
H	Charlie Keller, Newark Bears	211
R	Charlie Keller, Newark Bears	149
2B	Jim Gleeson, Newark Bears	50
3B	Joe Gantenbein, Toronto Maple Leafs; Johnny Hopp, Rochester Red Wings; Lou Vezilich, Rochester Red Wings	10
HR	Ollie Carnegie, Buffalo Bisons	45
RBI	Ollie Carnegie, Buffalo Bisons	136
SB	George Myatt, Jersey City Giants	45

=== Pitching leaders ===
Stat	Player	Total
W	Joe Sullivan, Toronto Maple Leafs	18
L	Tom Baker, Jersey City Giants	22
ERA	Red Barrett, Syracuse Chiefs	2.34
CG	Jake Mooty, Syracuse Chiefs	21
SHO	Rollie Stiles, Jersey City Giants	5
SO	Atley Donald, Newark Bears	133
IP	Rollie Stiles, Jersey City Giants	248.0

== Playoffs ==
- The Newark Bears won their second consecutive Governors' Cup, defeating the Buffalo Bisons in five games.

=== Playoff bracket ===
Semi-finals
1	Newark	4
3	Rochester	3
2	Syracuse	0
4	Buffalo	4

Governors' Cup
1	Newark	4
4	Buffalo	1

== See also ==
- 1938 Major League Baseball season
