= 1937 International League season =

- League: International League
- Sport: Baseball
- Duration: April 22 – September 12
- Games: 154
- Teams: 8

Regular season
- Season MVP: Buck Crouse, Buffalo/Baltimore

Governors' Cup Playoffs
- League champions: Newark Bears
- Runners-up: Baltimore Orioles

IL seasons
- ← 1936 1938 →

The 1937 International League was a Class AA baseball season played between April 22 and September 12. Eight teams played a 154-game schedule, with the top four teams qualifying for the post-season.

The Newark Bears won the Governors' Cup, defeating the Baltimore Orioles in the final round of the playoffs.

== Team changes ==
- The Albany Senators relocated to Jersey City, New Jersey and became the Jersey City Giants and became affiliated with the New York Giants.
- The Montreal Royals became affiliated with the Pittsburgh Pirates.
- The Toronto Maple Leafs ended their affiliation with the Cincinnati Reds.
- The Syracuse Chiefs ended their affiliation with the Boston Red Sox and became affiliated with the Cincinnati Reds.

== Teams ==
1937 International League
Team	City	MLB Affiliate	Stadium
Baltimore Orioles	Baltimore, Maryland	None	Oriole Park
Buffalo Bisons	Buffalo, New York	None	Offermann Stadium
Jersey City Giants	Jersey City, New Jersey	New York Giants	Roosevelt Stadium
Montreal Royals	Montreal, Quebec	Pittsburgh Pirates	Delorimier Stadium
Newark Bears	Newark, New Jersey	New York Yankees	Ruppert Stadium
Rochester Red Wings	Rochester, New York	St. Louis Cardinals	Red Wing Stadium
Syracuse Chiefs	Syracuse, New York	Cincinnati Reds	Municipal Stadium
Toronto Maple Leafs	Toronto, Ontario	None	Maple Leaf Stadium

== Map of teams ==
International League teams

== Regular season ==
=== Summary ===
- The Newark Bears set the league record for wins in a 154-game schedule with 109 victories.

=== Standings ===
International League
Team	Win	Loss	%	GB
Newark Bears	109	43	.717	–
Montreal Royals	82	67	.550	25.5
Syracuse Chiefs	78	74	.513	31
Baltimore Orioles	76	75	.503	32.5
Buffalo Bisons	74	79	.484	35.5
Rochester Red Wings	74	80	.481	36
Toronto Maple Leafs	63	88	.417	45.5
Jersey City Giants	50	100	.333	58

== League Leaders ==
=== Batting leaders ===
Stat	Player	Total
AVG	Charlie Keller, Newark Bears	.353
H	Charlie Keller, Newark Bears	189
R	Charlie Keller, Newark Bears	120
2B	Jim Gleeson, Newark Bears	47
3B	Johnny Hopp, Rochester Red Wings; Charlie Keller, Newark Bears	14
HR	Ab Wright, Baltimore Orioles	37
RBI	Ab Wright, Baltimore Orioles	127
SB	Johnny Hopp, Rochester Red Wings	33

=== Pitching leaders ===
Stat	Player	Total
W	Joe Beggs, Newark Bears; Marvin Duke, Montreal Royals	21
L	Glen Gabler, Jersey City Giants	24
ERA	Ben Cantwell, Jersey City Giants	1.65
CG	Harry Smythe, Montreal Royals	24
SHO	Rip Sewell, Buffalo Bisons	6
SO	Nubs Kleinke, Rochester Red Wings	150
IP	Bill Harris, Buffalo Bisons	257.0

== Playoffs ==
- The Newark Bears won their first Governors' Cup, defeating the Baltimore Orioles in four games. The Bears became the first team to go undefeated in the playoffs.

=== Playoff bracket ===
Semi-finals
1	Newark	4
3	Syracuse	0
2	Montreal	1
4	Baltimore	4

Governors' Cup
1	Newark	4
4	Baltimore	0

== See also ==
- 1937 Major League Baseball season
