= 1941 International League season =

- League: International League
- Sport: Baseball
- Duration: April 17 – September 7
- Games: 154
- Teams: 8

Regular season
- Season MVP: Fred Hutchinson, Buffalo Bisons

Governors' Cup Playoffs
- League champions: Montreal Royals
- Runners-up: Newark Bears

IL seasons
- ← 1940 1942 →

The 1941 International League was a Class AA baseball season played between April 17 and September 7. Eight teams played a 154-game schedule, with the top four teams qualifying for the post-season.

The Montreal Royals won the Governors' Cup, defeating the Newark Bears in the final round of the playoffs.

== Team changes ==
- The Baltimore Orioles are no longer affiliated with the Philadelphia Phillies.
- The Syracuse Chiefs are no longer affiliated with the Pittsburgh Pirates.

== Teams ==
1941 International League
Team	City	MLB Affiliate	Stadium
Baltimore Orioles	Baltimore, Maryland	None	Oriole Park
Buffalo Bisons	Buffalo, New York	Detroit Tigers	Offermann Stadium
Jersey City Giants	Jersey City, New Jersey	New York Giants	Roosevelt Stadium
Montreal Royals	Montreal, Quebec	Brooklyn Dodgers	Delorimier Stadium
Newark Bears	Newark, New Jersey	New York Yankees	Ruppert Stadium
Rochester Red Wings	Rochester, New York	St. Louis Cardinals	Red Wing Stadium
Syracuse Chiefs	Syracuse, New York	None	Municipal Stadium
Toronto Maple Leafs	Toronto, Ontario	Philadelphia Athletics	Maple Leaf Stadium

== Map of teams ==
International League teams

== Regular season ==
=== Summary ===
- The Newark Bears finished with the best record in the regular season for the first time since 1938.
- The schedule was decreased from 162 games back to 154 games after one season.

=== Standings ===
International League
Team	Win	Loss	%	GB
Newark Bears	100	54	.649	–
Montreal Royals	90	64	.584	10
Buffalo Bisons	88	65	.575	11.5
Rochester Red Wings	84	68	.553	15
Jersey City Giants	74	76	.493	24
Syracuse Chiefs	70	83	.458	29.5
Baltimore Orioles	58	94	.382	41
Toronto Maple Leafs	47	107	.305	53

== League Leaders ==
=== Batting leaders ===
Stat	Player	Total
AVG	Gene Corbett, Baltimore/Newark	.306
H	Tommy Holmes, Newark Bears	190
R	Frankie Kelleher, Newark Bears	106
2B	Woody Jensen, Montreal Royals	33
3B	Whitey Kurowski, Rochester Red Wings	11
HR	Frankie Kelleher, Newark Bears	37
RBI	Frankie Kelleher, Newark Bears	125
SB	Paul Campbell, Montreal Royals	24

=== Pitching leaders ===
Stat	Player	Total
W	Fred Hutchinson, Buffalo Bisons	26
L	Carl Fischer, Toronto Maple Leafs	17
ERA	Johnny Lindell, Newark Bears	2.05
CG	Fred Hutchinson, Buffalo Bisons	31
SHO	Max Surkont, Rochester Red Wings; Hy Vandenberg, Rochester Red Wings; Hal White, Buffalo Bisons	5
SO	Virgil Trucks, Buffalo Bisons	204
IP	Fred Hutchinson, Buffalo Bisons	284.0

== Playoffs ==
- The Montreal Royals won their first Governors' Cup, defeating the Newark Bears in seven games.

=== Playoff bracket ===
Semi-finals
1	Newark	4
4	Rochester	1
2	Montreal	4
3	Buffalo	3

Governors' Cup
1	Newark	3
2	Montreal	4

== See also ==
- 1941 Major League Baseball season
