= 1940 International League season =

- League: International League
- Sport: Baseball
- Duration: April 18 – September 15
- Games: 162
- Teams: 8

Regular season
- Season MVP: Mike Ryba, Rochester Red Wings

Governors' Cup Playoffs
- League champions: Newark Bears
- Runners-up: Baltimore Orioles

IL seasons
- ← 1939 1941 →

The 1940 International League was a Class AA baseball season played between April 18 and September 15. Eight teams played a 162-game schedule, with the top four teams qualifying for the post-season.

The Newark Bears won the Governors' Cup, defeating the Baltimore Orioles in the final round of the playoffs.

== Team changes ==
- The Baltimore Orioles become an affiliate for the Philadelphia Phillies.
- The Buffalo Bisons end their affiliation with the Cleveland Indians and become an affiliate for the Detroit Tigers.
- The Syracuse Chiefs become an affiliate for the Pittsburgh Pirates.
- The Toronto Maple Leafs become an affiliate for the Philadelphia Athletics.

== Teams ==
1940 International League
Team	City	MLB Affiliate	Stadium
Baltimore Orioles	Baltimore, Maryland	Philadelphia Phillies	Oriole Park
Buffalo Bisons	Buffalo, New York	Detroit Tigers	Offermann Stadium
Jersey City Giants	Jersey City, New Jersey	New York Giants	Roosevelt Stadium
Montreal Royals	Montreal, Quebec	Brooklyn Dodgers	Delorimier Stadium
Newark Bears	Newark, New Jersey	New York Yankees	Ruppert Stadium
Rochester Red Wings	Rochester, New York	St. Louis Cardinals	Red Wing Stadium
Syracuse Chiefs	Syracuse, New York	Pittsburgh Pirates	Municipal Stadium
Toronto Maple Leafs	Toronto, Ontario	Philadelphia Athletics	Maple Leaf Stadium

== Map of teams ==
International League teams

== Regular season ==
=== Summary ===
- The Rochester Red Wings finished with the best record in the regular season for the first time since 1931.
- For the first time in league history, every team was affiliated with a Major League Baseball team.
- The schedule was increased from 154-games to 162-games.

=== Standings ===
International League
Team	Win	Loss	%	GB
Rochester Red Wings	96	61	.611	–
Newark Bears	95	65	.594	2.5
Jersey City Giants	81	78	.509	16
Baltimore Orioles	81	79	.506	16.5
Montreal Royals	80	80	.500	17.5
Buffalo Bisons	76	83	.478	21
Syracuse Chiefs	71	90	.441	27
Toronto Maple Leafs	57	101	.361	39.5

== League Leaders ==
=== Batting leaders ===
Stat	Player	Total
AVG	Red Howell, Baltimore Orioles	.359
H	Tommy Holmes, Newark Bears	211
R	Tommy Holmes, Newark Bears	126
2B	Gene Corbett, Baltimore Orioles; Nick Etten, Baltimore Orioles; George Staller, Montreal Royals	40
3B	George Staller, Montreal Royals	12
HR	Bill Nagel, Baltimore Orioles	37
RBI	Nick Etten, Baltimore Orioles	128
SB	Eddie Collins Jr., Baltimore Orioles	21

=== Pitching leaders ===
Stat	Player	Total
W	Mike Ryba, Rochester Red Wings	24
L	Floyd Giebell, Buffalo Bisons; Ted Kleinhans, Syracuse Chiefs	17
ERA	Hal White, Buffalo Bisons	2.43
CG	Mike Ryba, Rochester Red Wings	25
SHO	Mike Ryba, Rochester Red Wings; Hank Gornicki, Rochester Red Wings	5
SO	George Washburn, Newark Bears	145
IP	Mike Ryba, Rochester Red Wings	272.0

== Playoffs ==
- The Newark Bears won their third Governors' Cup in four seasons, defeating the Baltimore Orioles in seven games.

=== Playoff bracket ===
Semi-finals
1	Rochester	2
4	Baltimore	4
2	Newark	4
3	Jersey City	0

Governors' Cup
4	Baltimore	3
2	Newark	4

== See also ==
- 1940 Major League Baseball season
