= 1936 International League season =

- League: International League
- Sport: Baseball
- Duration: April 16 – September 7
- Games: 154
- Teams: 8

Regular season
- Season MVP: Beauty McGowan, Buffalo Bisons

Governors' Cup Playoffs
- League champions: Buffalo Bisons
- Runners-up: Baltimore Orioles

IL seasons
- ← 1935 1937 →

The 1936 International League was a Class AA baseball season played between April 16 and September 7. Eight teams played a 154-game schedule, with the top four teams qualifying for the post-season.

The Buffalo Bisons won the Governors' Cup, defeating the Baltimore Orioles in the final round of the playoffs.

== Teams ==
1936 International League
Team	City	MLB Affiliate	Stadium
Albany Senators	Albany, New York	Washington Senators	Hawkins Stadium
Baltimore Orioles	Baltimore, Maryland	None	Oriole Park
Buffalo Bisons	Buffalo, New York	None	Offermann Stadium
Montreal Royals	Montreal, Quebec	None	Delorimier Stadium
Newark Bears	Newark, New Jersey	New York Yankees	Ruppert Stadium
Rochester Red Wings	Rochester, New York	St. Louis Cardinals	Red Wing Stadium
Syracuse Chiefs	Syracuse, New York	Boston Red Sox	Municipal Stadium
Toronto Maple Leafs	Toronto, Ontario	Cincinnati Reds	Maple Leaf Stadium

== Map of teams ==
International League teams

== Regular season ==
=== Summary ===
- The Buffalo Bisons finished with the best regular season record for the first time since 1927.

=== Standings ===
International League
Team	Win	Loss	%	GB
Buffalo Bisons	94	60	.610	–
Rochester Red Wings	89	66	.574	5.5
Newark Bears	88	67	.568	6.5
Baltimore Orioles	81	72	.529	12.5
Toronto Maple Leafs	77	76	.503	16.5
Montreal Royals	71	81	.467	22
Syracuse Chiefs	59	95	.383	35
Albany Senators	56	98	.364	38

== League Leaders ==
=== Batting leaders ===
Stat	Player	Total
AVG	Smead Jolley, Albany Senators	.373
H	Smead Jolley, Albany Senators	221
R	Woody Abernathy, Baltimore Orioles	132
2B	Smead Jolley, Albany Senators	52
3B	Babe Dahlgren, Syracuse Chiefs	21
HR	Woody Abernathy, Baltimore Orioles	42
RBI	Buster Mills, Rochester Red Wings	134
SB	Johnny Dickshot, Buffalo Bisons	33

=== Pitching leaders ===
Stat	Player	Total
W	Bob Weiland, Rochester Red Wings	23
L	Leon Pettit, Albany Senators	22
ERA	Steve Sundra, Newark Bears	2.84
CG	Sheriff Blake, Baltimore Orioles; Lauri Myllykangas, Montreal Royals	18
SHO	Si Johnson, Toronto Maple Leafs; Kemp Wicker, Newark Bears	5
SO	Bob Weiland, Rochester Red Wings	171
IP	Cliff Melton, Baltimore Orioles	271.0

== Playoffs ==
- The Buffalo Bisons won their second Governors' Cup, defeating the Baltimore Orioles in six games.

=== Playoff bracket ===
Semi-finals
1	Buffalo	4
3	Newark	1
2	Rochester	2
4	Baltimore	4

Governors' Cup
1	Buffalo	4
4	Baltimore	2

== See also ==
- 1936 Major League Baseball season
