= 1942 International League season =

- League: International League
- Sport: Baseball
- Duration: April 16 – September 7
- Games: 154
- Teams: 8

Regular season
- Season MVP: Red Barrett, Syracuse Chiefs

Governors' Cup Playoffs
- League champions: Syracuse Chiefs
- Runners-up: Jersey City Giants

IL seasons
- ← 1941 1943 →

The 1942 International League was a Class AA baseball season played between April 16 and September 7. Eight teams played a 154-game schedule, with the top four teams qualifying for the post-season.

The Syracuse Chiefs won the Governors' Cup, defeating the Jersey City Giants in the final round of the playoffs.

== Team changes ==
- The Baltimore Orioles begin an affiliation with the Cleveland Indians.
- The Syracuse Chiefs begin an affiliation with the Cincinnati Reds.
- The Toronto Maple Leafs are no longer affiliated with the Philadelphia Athletics.

== Teams ==
1942 International League
Team	City	MLB Affiliate	Stadium
Baltimore Orioles	Baltimore, Maryland	Cleveland Indians	Oriole Park
Buffalo Bisons	Buffalo, New York	Detroit Tigers	Offermann Stadium
Jersey City Giants	Jersey City, New Jersey	New York Giants	Roosevelt Stadium
Montreal Royals	Montreal, Quebec	Brooklyn Dodgers	Delorimier Stadium
Newark Bears	Newark, New Jersey	New York Yankees	Ruppert Stadium
Rochester Red Wings	Rochester, New York	St. Louis Cardinals	Red Wing Stadium
Syracuse Chiefs	Syracuse, New York	Cincinnati Reds	Municipal Stadium
Toronto Maple Leafs	Toronto, Ontario	None	Maple Leaf Stadium

== Map of teams ==
International League teams

== Regular season ==
=== Summary ===
- The Newark Bears finished with the best record in the regular season for the second consecutive season and the seventh time in the past 11 seasons.

=== Standings ===
International League
Team	Win	Loss	%	GB
Newark Bears	92	61	.601	–
Montreal Royals	82	71	.536	10
Syracuse Chiefs	78	74	.513	13.5
Jersey City Giants	77	75	.507	14.5
Baltimore Orioles	75	77	.493	16.5
Toronto Maple Leafs	74	79	.484	18
Buffalo Bisons	73	80	.477	19
Rochester Red Wings	59	93	.388	32.5

== League Leaders ==
=== Batting leaders ===
Stat	Player	Total
AVG	Hank Majeski, Newark Bears	.345
H	Hank Majeski, Newark Bears	198
R	Gene Moore, Montreal Royals	114
2B	Johnny Rucker, Jersey City Giants	34
3B	Gene Moore, Montreal Royals	12
HR	Lester Burge, Montreal Royals	28
RBI	Hank Majeski, Newark Bears	121
SB	Snuffy Stirnweiss, Newark Bears	73

=== Pitching leaders ===
Stat	Player	Total
W	Red Barrett, Syracuse Chiefs	20
L	Max Surkont, Rochester Red Wings	18
ERA	Bobby Coombs, Jersey City Giants	1.99
CG	Red Barrett, Syracuse Chiefs	25
SHO	Nate Andrews, Syracuse Chiefs; Red Barrett, Syracuse Chiefs	7
SO	Jack Hallett, Toronto Maple Leafs	187
IP	Red Barrett, Syracuse Chiefs	268.0

== Playoffs ==
- The Syracuse Chiefs won their second Governors' Cup, defeating the Jersey City Giants in four games.

=== Playoff bracket ===
Semi-finals
1	Newark	2
4	Jersey City	4
2	Montreal	1
3	Syracuse	4

Governors' Cup
4	Jersey City	0
3	Syracuse	4

== See also ==
- 1942 Major League Baseball season
