= 1929 International League season =

- League: International League
- Sport: Baseball
- Duration: April 17 – September 23
- Games: 168
- Teams: 8

International League Pennant
- League champions: Rochester Red Wings
- Runners-up: Toronto Maple Leafs

IL seasons
- ← 1928 1930 →

The 1929 International League was a Class AA baseball season played between April 17 and September 23. Eight teams played a 168-game schedule, with the first place team winning the pennant.

The Rochester Red Wings won the International League pennant, finishing in first place, eleven games ahead of the second place Toronto Maple Leafs.

== Team changes ==
- The Rochester Red Wings moved into a new home ballpark, Silver Stadium.

== Teams ==
1929 International League
Team	City	MLB Affiliate	Stadium
Baltimore Orioles	Baltimore, Maryland	None	Oriole Park
Buffalo Bisons	Buffalo, New York	None	Bison Stadium
Jersey City Skeeters	Jersey City, New Jersey	None	West Side Park
Montreal Royals	Montreal, Quebec	None	Delorimier Stadium
Newark Bears	Newark, New Jersey	None	Davids' Stadium
Reading Keystones	Reading, Pennsylvania	Chicago Cubs	Lauer's Park
Rochester Red Wings	Rochester, New York	St. Louis Cardinals	Red Wing Stadium
Toronto Maple Leafs	Toronto, Ontario	None	Maple Leaf Stadium

== Map of teams ==
International League teams

== Regular season ==
=== Summary ===
- The Rochester Red Wings won their second consecutive pennant, finishing eleven games ahead of the Toronto Maple Leafs.
- George Quellich of the Reading Keystones set a professional league record as he had hits in 15 straight at-bats, which included a double and five home runs during his streak.

=== Standings ===
International League
Team	Win	Loss	%	GB
Rochester Red Wings	103	65	.613	–
Toronto Maple Leafs	92	76	.548	11
Baltimore Orioles	90	78	.536	13
Montreal Royals	88	79	.527	14.5
Buffalo Bisons	83	84	.497	20.5
Newark Bears	81	85	.488	21
Reading Keystones	80	86	.482	22
Jersey City Skeeters	51	115	.307	51

== League Leaders ==
=== Batting leaders ===
Stat	Player	Total
AVG	Danny Taylor, Reading Keystones	.371
H	Rabbit Whitman, Reading Keystones	230
R	Specs Toporcer, Rochester Red Wings	142
2B	Chicken Hawks, Reading Keystones	44
3B	Joe Rabbitt, Toronto Maple Leafs	18
HR	Ripper Collins, Rochester Red Wings	38
RBI	Ripper Collins, Rochester Red Wings	146
SB	Joe Rabbitt, Toronto Maple Leafs	46

=== Pitching leaders ===
Stat	Player	Total
W	Chief Hogsett, Montreal Royals	22
L	Jess Bream, Jersey City Skeeters	20
ERA	Hub Pruett, Newark Bears	2.43
CG	Chief Hogsett, Montreal Royals	28
SHO	Al Mamaux, Newark Bears	7
SO	Carl Fischer, Newark Bears	191
IP	Chief Hogsett, Montreal Royals	288.0

== See also ==
- 1929 Major League Baseball season
