= 1930 International League season =

- League: International League
- Sport: Baseball
- Duration: April 16 – September 21
- Games: 168
- Teams: 8

International League Pennant
- League champions: Rochester Red Wings
- Runners-up: Baltimore Orioles

IL seasons
- ← 1929 1931 →

The 1930 International League was a Class AA baseball season played between April 16 and September 21. Eight teams played a 168-game schedule, with the first place team winning the pennant.

The Rochester Red Wings won the International League pennant, finishing in first place, eight games ahead of the second place Baltimore Orioles.

== Teams ==
1930 International League
Team	City	MLB Affiliate	Stadium
Baltimore Orioles	Baltimore, Maryland	None	Oriole Park
Buffalo Bisons	Buffalo, New York	None	Bison Stadium
Jersey City Skeeters	Jersey City, New Jersey	None	West Side Park
Montreal Royals	Montreal, Quebec	None	Delorimier Stadium
Newark Bears	Newark, New Jersey	None	Davids' Stadium
Reading Keystones	Reading, Pennsylvania	Chicago Cubs	Lauer's Park
Rochester Red Wings	Rochester, New York	St. Louis Cardinals	Red Wing Stadium
Toronto Maple Leafs	Toronto, Ontario	None	Maple Leaf Stadium

== Map of teams ==
International League teams

== Regular season ==
=== Summary ===
- The Rochester Red Wings won their third consecutive pennant, finishing eight games ahead of the Baltimore Orioles.
- Joe Hauser of the Baltimore Orioles set a league record with 63 home runs.
- Ripper Collins of the Rochester Red Wings set a league record with 180 RBI.

=== Standings ===
International League
Team	Win	Loss	%	GB
Rochester Red Wings	105	62	.629	–
Baltimore Orioles	97	70	.581	8
Montreal Royals	96	72	.571	9.5
Toronto Maple Leafs	87	80	.521	18
Newark Bears	80	88	.476	25.5
Buffalo Bisons	74	91	.448	30
Reading Keystones	68	98	.410	36.5
Jersey City Skeeters	59	105	.360	44.5

== League Leaders ==
=== Batting leaders ===
Stat	Player	Total
AVG	Ripper Collins, Rochester Red Wings	.376
H	Ripper Collins, Rochester Red Wings	234
R	Joe Hauser, Baltimore Orioles	173
2B	Specs Toporcer, Rochester Red Wings	49
3B	Ripper Collins, Rochester Red Wings	19
HR	Joe Hauser, Baltimore Orioles	63
RBI	Ripper Collins, Rochester Red Wings	180
SB	Hinkey Haines, Montreal Royals	45

=== Pitching leaders ===
Stat	Player	Total
W	Paul Derringer, Rochester Red Wings	23
L	Jess Bream, Jersey City Skeeters	22
ERA	Jack Berly, Rochester Red Wings	2.49
CG	Marty Griffin, Montreal Royals; Hank Thormahlen, Montreal Royals	18
SO	Paul Derringer, Rochester Red Wings	164
IP	Paul Derringer, Rochester Red Wings	289.0

== See also ==
- 1930 Major League Baseball season
