= 1943 International League season =

- League: International League
- Sport: Baseball
- Duration: April 22 – September 12
- Games: 154
- Teams: 8

Regular season
- Season MVP: Red Schoendienst, Rochester Red Wings

Governors' Cup Playoffs
- League champions: Syracuse Chiefs
- Runners-up: Toronto Maple Leafs

IL seasons
- ← 1942 1944 →

The 1943 International League was a Class AA baseball season played between April 22 and September 12. Eight teams played a 154-game schedule, with the top four teams qualifying for the post-season.

The Syracuse Chiefs won the Governors' Cup, defeating the Toronto Maple Leafs in the final round of the playoffs.

== Team changes ==
- The Toronto Maple Leafs begin an affiliation with the Pittsburgh Pirates.

== Teams ==
1943 International League
Team	City	MLB Affiliate	Stadium
Baltimore Orioles	Baltimore, Maryland	Cleveland Indians	Oriole Park
Buffalo Bisons	Buffalo, New York	Detroit Tigers	Offermann Stadium
Jersey City Giants	Jersey City, New Jersey	New York Giants	Roosevelt Stadium
Montreal Royals	Montreal, Quebec	Brooklyn Dodgers	Delorimier Stadium
Newark Bears	Newark, New Jersey	New York Yankees	Ruppert Stadium
Rochester Red Wings	Rochester, New York	St. Louis Cardinals	Red Wing Stadium
Syracuse Chiefs	Syracuse, New York	Cincinnati Reds	MacArthur Stadium
Toronto Maple Leafs	Toronto, Ontario	Pittsburgh Pirates	Maple Leaf Stadium

== Map of teams ==
International League teams

== Regular season ==
=== Summary ===
- The Toronto Maple Leafs finished with the best record in the regular season for the first time since 1926.

=== Standings ===
International League
Team	Win	Loss	%	GB
Toronto Maple Leafs	95	57	.625	–
Newark Bears	85	68	.556	10.5
Syracuse Chiefs	82	71	.536	13.5
Montreal Royals	76	76	.500	19
Rochester Red Wings	74	78	.487	21
Baltimore Orioles	73	81	.474	23
Buffalo Bisons	66	87	.431	29.5
Jersey City Giants	60	93	.392	35.5

== League Leaders ==
=== Batting leaders ===
Stat	Player	Total
AVG	Red Schoendienst, Rochester Red Wings	.337
H	Red Schoendienst, Rochester Red Wings	187
R	Frankie Zak, Toronto Maple Leafs	101
2B	Roberto Ortiz, Montreal Royals	40
3B	Luis Olmo, Montreal Royals	12
HR	Ed Kobesky, Buffalo Bisons	18
RBI	George Staller, Baltimore Orioles	98
SB	Roland Harrington, Syracuse Chiefs	52

=== Pitching leaders ===
Stat	Player	Total
W	Ed Klieman, Baltimore Orioles	23
L	Bill Voiselle, Jersey City Giants	21
ERA	Lou Polli, Jersey City Giants	1.81
CG	Rufe Gentry, Buffalo Bisons	27
SHO	Luke Hamlin, Toronto Maple Leafs	8
SO	Steve Gromek, Baltimore Orioles	188
IP	Rufe Gentry, Buffalo Bisons	285.0

== Playoffs ==
- The Syracuse Chiefs won their second consecutive Governors' Cup, and third overall, defeating the Toronto Maple Leafs in six games.

=== Playoff bracket ===
Semi-finals
1	Toronto	4
4	Montreal	0
2	Newark	1
3	Syracuse	4

Governors' Cup
1	Toronto	2
3	Syracuse	4

== See also ==
- 1943 Major League Baseball season
