= 1931 International League season =

- League: International League
- Sport: Baseball
- Duration: April 15 – September 20
- Games: 168
- Teams: 8

International League Pennant
- League champions: Rochester Red Wings
- Runners-up: Newark Bears

IL seasons
- ← 1930 1932 →

The 1931 International League was a Class AA baseball season played between April 15 and September 20. Eight teams played a 168-game schedule, with the first place team winning the pennant.

The Rochester Red Wings won the International League pennant, finishing in first place, two games ahead of the second place Newark Bears.

== Team changes ==
- The Reading Keystones are no longer affiliated with the Chicago Cubs.

== Teams ==
1931 International League
Team	City	MLB Affiliate	Stadium
Baltimore Orioles	Baltimore, Maryland	None	Oriole Park
Buffalo Bisons	Buffalo, New York	None	Bison Stadium
Jersey City Skeeters	Jersey City, New Jersey	None	West Side Park
Montreal Royals	Montreal, Quebec	None	Delorimier Stadium
Newark Bears	Newark, New Jersey	None	Davids' Stadium
Reading Keystones	Reading, Pennsylvania	None	Lauer's Park
Rochester Red Wings	Rochester, New York	St. Louis Cardinals	Red Wing Stadium
Toronto Maple Leafs	Toronto, Ontario	None	Maple Leaf Stadium

== Map of teams ==
International League teams

== Regular season ==
=== Summary ===
- The Rochester Red Wings won their fourth consecutive pennant, finishing two games ahead of the Newark Bears.

=== Standings ===
International League
Team	Win	Loss	%	GB
Rochester Red Wings	101	67	.601	–
Newark Bears	99	69	.589	2
Baltimore Orioles	94	70	.573	6
Montreal Royals	85	80	.515	14.5
Toronto Maple Leafs	83	84	.497	17.5
Reading Keystones	79	88	.473	21.5
Jersey City Skeeters	65	102	.389	35.5
Buffalo Bisons	61	105	.367	39

== League Leaders ==
=== Batting leaders ===
Stat	Player	Total
AVG	Ike Boone, Newark Bears	.356
H	Ray Pepper, Rochester Red Wings	233
R	Ray Pepper, Rochester Red Wings	123
2B	Johnny Gill, Baltimore Orioles	46
3B	Ray Pepper, Rochester Red Wings	20
HR	Joe Hauser, Baltimore Orioles	31
RBI	Jim Poole, Reading Keystones	180
SB	Denny Sothern, Baltimore Orioles	33

=== Pitching leaders ===
Stat	Player	Total
W	Monte Weaver, Baltimore Orioles	21
L	Jimmie DeShong, Jersey City Skeeters; John Wilson, Buffalo Bisons	18
ERA	Ray Starr, Rochester Red Wings	2.83
CG	Johnny Allen, Jersey City/Toronto	24
SHO	Ira Smith, Rochester Red Wings	6
SO	Don Brennan, Newark Bears	143
IP	Don Brennan, Newark Bears	250.0

== See also ==
- 1931 Major League Baseball season
