= 1928 International League season =

- League: International League
- Sport: Baseball
- Duration: April 18 – September 23
- Games: 168
- Teams: 8

International League Pennant
- League champions: Rochester Red Wings
- Runners-up: Buffalo Bisons

IL seasons
- ← 1927 1929 →

The 1928 International League was a Class AA baseball season played between April 18 and September 23. Eight teams played a 168-game schedule, with the first place team winning the pennant.

The Rochester Red Wings won the International League pennant, finishing in first place with a .001 better winning percentage than the second place Buffalo Bisons.

== Team changes ==
- The Syracuse Stars moved to the New York-Pennsylvania League.
- The Montreal Royals returned to the league following an 11-year hiatus.
- The Rochester Tribe are renamed the Rochester Red Wings and are affiliated with the St. Louis Cardinals.

== Teams ==
1928 International League
Team	City	MLB Affiliate	Stadium
Baltimore Orioles	Baltimore, Maryland	None	Oriole Park
Buffalo Bisons	Buffalo, New York	None	Bison Stadium
Jersey City Skeeters	Jersey City, New Jersey	None	West Side Park
Montreal Royals	Montreal, Quebec	None	Delorimier Stadium
Newark Bears	Newark, New Jersey	None	Davids' Stadium
Reading Keystones	Reading, Pennsylvania	Chicago Cubs	Lauer's Park
Rochester Red Wings	Rochester, New York	St. Louis Cardinals	Bay Street Ball Grounds
Toronto Maple Leafs	Toronto, Ontario	None	Maple Leaf Stadium

== Map of teams ==
International League teams

== Regular season ==
=== Summary ===
- The Rochester Red Wings won the pennant due to having a winning percentage of .001 higher than the Buffalo Bisons.

=== Standings ===
International League
Team	Win	Loss	%	GB
Rochester Red Wings	90	74	.549	–
Buffalo Bisons	92	76	.548	–
Toronto Maple Leafs	86	80	.518	5
Reading Keystones	84	83	.503	7.5
Montreal Royals	84	84	.500	8
Baltimore Orioles	82	82	.500	8
Newark Bears	81	84	.491	9.5
Jersey City Skeeters	66	102	.393	26

== League Leaders ==
=== Batting leaders ===
Stat	Player	Total
AVG	Dale Alexander, Toronto Maple Leafs	.380
H	Dale Alexander, Toronto Maple Leafs	236
R	Joe Brown, Rochester Red Wings	137
2B	Dale Alexander, Toronto Maple Leafs	49
3B	Johnny Moore, Reading Keystones	18
HR	Dale Alexander, Toronto Maple Leafs	31
RBI	Dale Alexander, Toronto Maple Leafs	144
SB	Joe Rabbitt, Toronto Maple Leafs	42

=== Pitching leaders ===
Stat	Player	Total
W	Socks Seibold, Reading Keystones	22
L	Nick Harrison, Reading Keystones	20
ERA	Jess Bream, Jersey City Skeeters	2.32
CG	Augie Prudhomme, Toronto Maple Leafs	27
SHO	Socks Seibold, Reading Keystones	7
SO	Guy Cantrell, Buffalo Bisons	165
IP	Guy Cantrell, Buffalo Bisons	290.0

== See also ==
- 1928 Major League Baseball season
