= Woody Abernathy =

Woody Abernathy may refer to:

- Woody Abernathy (pitcher) (1915–1994), American Major League Baseball player
- Woody Abernathy (outfielder) (1908–1961), minor league baseball player
