= George Washburn (baseball) =

American baseball player (1914-1979)

- Pitcher
- Born: October 6, 1914; Solon, Maine, U.S.
- Died: January 5, 1979 (aged 64); Baton Rouge, Louisiana, U.S.
- Batted: Left Threw: Right

MLB debut
- May 4, 1941, for the New York Yankees

Last MLB appearance
- May 4, 1941, for the New York Yankees

MLB statistics
- Won–lost record: 0–1
- Earned run average: 13.50
- Strikeouts: 1
- Stats at Baseball Reference

Teams
- New York Yankees (1941)

George Edward Washburn (October 6, 1914 – January 5, 1979) was an American professional baseball player whose 18-season pro career (16 as a pitcher) included but one game in Major League Baseball on May 4, 1941, as a member of the New York Yankees.

Born in Solon, Maine, he threw right-handed, batted left-handed, and was listed as 6 feet 1 inch (1.85 m) tall and 175 pounds (79 kg).

Washburn's Organized Baseball tenure stretched from 1935 to 1952, and included the war years of 1942–1945. He debuted in the Yankees' farm system and by 1938 he was pitching at the top level of the minor leagues. In 1940, he won 18 games, losing eight, for the Newark Bears of the International League. The following season, at age 26, he made what would be his lone MLB appearance.

On Sunday, May 4, Washburn took the ball from manager Joe McCarthy as the starting pitcher against the defending American League champion Detroit Tigers at Briggs Stadium. He retired Detroit in order in the first inning—getting Baseball Hall of Famer Charlie Gehringer on a ground ball to first base. Staked to a 1–0 lead by a Charlie Keller home run, Washburn unraveled in the second inning. He walked four men, including Hall of Famer Hank Greenberg, threw a wild pitch, and surrendered three runs, all earned. He remained in the game, however, and, batting in the top of the third inning, he struck out against Bobo Newsom in what would be his only MLB at bat. Then, in the bottom of the third, Washburn gave up a leadoff triple to Barney McCosky and walked Gehringer. He was relieved by Marv Breuer with none out and the Yankees trailing 3–1. Breuer struck out both Rudy York and Greenberg, but gave up an unearned tally when McCosky scored on a two-out error by Phil Rizzuto.

That closed the book on Washburn's major-league pitching career. In two-plus innings pitched, he allowed only two hits but five bases on balls, three earned runs and a wild pitch, striking out one. He was charged with the Yanks' eventual 10–1 defeat for his one big-league decision. Washburn returned to Newark for the balance of 1941, then played another 11 seasons. Sent to the high-level New Orleans Pelicans of the Southern Association in 1944, he found a home in Louisiana, eventually spending almost six full seasons in the lower-level Evangeline League as a player-manager, appearing as a first baseman and outfielder as well as taking on mound duties.

He died in Baton Rouge on January 5, 1979, aged 64.
