= Ruppert Stadium =

Ruppert Stadium may refer to:

- Ruppert Stadium (Newark) in Newark, New Jersey
- Municipal Stadium (Kansas City, Missouri), which was once called Ruppert Stadium
