= Ollie Carnegie =

Italian-American professional baseball player

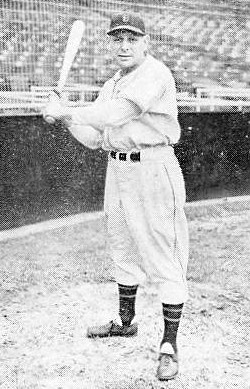
- Outfielder / Manager
- Born: June 29, 1899; Pittsburgh, Pennsylvania, U.S.
- Died: October 4, 1976 (aged 77); Buffalo, New York, U.S.
- Batted: Right Threw: Right

MiLB statistics
- Batting average: .309
- Hits: 1665
- Doubles: 302
- Home runs: 297
- Stats at Baseball Reference

Managerial statistics
- Wins: 70
- Losses: 54

Teams
- As player: Flint Vehicles (MION, 1922); Hazleton Mountaineers (NYPL, 1931); Lockport White Sox (PONY, 1942); Jamestown Falcons (PONY, 1944); Buffalo Bisons (IL, 1931–1941, 1945); As manager: Jamestown Falcons (PONY, 1944)

Career highlights and awards
- Led the International League in home runs (1938, 1939); International League MVP (1938); Greater Buffalo Sports Hall of Fame (1992); Buffalo Baseball Hall of Fame (1985); Buffalo Bisons #6 retired; International League all-time RBI leader; Other awards and accomplishments

Member of the International League

Baseball Hall of Fame
- Induction: 1947

Oliver Angelo Carnegie (June 29, 1899 [or 1898] – October 4, 1976) was an Italian American professional baseball player whose playing career spanned 15 seasons. Over that time, Carnegie played in the minor leagues with the Class-B Flint Vehicles (1922) of the Michigan–Ontario League; the Class-B Hazleton Mountaineers (1931) of the New York–Penn League; the Double-A Buffalo Bisons (1931–1941, 1945) of the International League; and the Class-D Lockport White Sox (1942) and the Class-D Jamestown Falcons (1944) of the Pennsylvania–Ontario–New York League (PONY League). In 1,539 career games played, Carnegie batted .309 with 1665 hits, 302 doubles, 48 triples and 297 home runs. Carnegie batted and threw right-handed. Carnegie also managed the Class-D Jamestown Falcons in 1944. Officially a player-manager since he also played 96 games that season, Carnegie led the Falcons to a 70–54 record which was good enough for second overall in the PONY League.

In 1921, Carnegie started playing professional baseball. He later left the professional circuit to play in a semi-professional baseball league based in Allegheny County, where he was from. Over those years, Carnegie played for teams representing Dormont, Pennsylvania, McKeesport, Pennsylvania, Johnstown, Pennsylvania, Beaver Falls, Pennsylvania, Pitcairn, Pennsylvania and others. The Pittsburgh Press, which covered the league, nicknamed Carnegie the "Bambino" and described him as the "sandlot Babe Ruth". Carnegie returned to professional baseball in 1931 after accepting a contract with the Hazleton Mountaineers, a minor league team owned by the Pittsburgh Pirates.

The Buffalo Bisons purchased Carnegie from the Hazleton Mountaineers in 1931. This would be the beginning of a tenure which would last for 12 nonconsecutive seasons. Carnegie is the Bisons career record holder in hits, home runs, runs batted in and games played. He also holds the Bisons' single-season record in home runs with 42. Carnegie led the International League in home runs in 1938 and 1939. Carnegie has won multiple accolades during his career and after. In 1938, he won the International League Most Valuable Player Award. Carnegie was the career International League leader in home runs with 258, until Mike Hessman hit his 259th on June 30, 2014. He is the career leader in runs batted in (1,044) for the International League. He was also an inaugural member of the International League Hall of Fame and the Buffalo Baseball Hall of Fame. Carnegie is also a Greater Buffalo Sports Hall of Fame member, inducted in 1992. Among many fans and professionals, Carnegie is widely renowned as one of the best Buffalo baseball players ever.

== Early life ==
On June 29, 1899 (or 1898), Oliver Angelo "Ollie" Carnegie was born in Pittsburgh, Pennsylvania to Benjamin and Rose Carnegie, who were both from Italy.

Carnegie was offered professional contracts by the Pittsburgh Pirates and Washington Senators in 1920 and 1921, respectively, but declined both times. He officially started his professional baseball career in 1922 at the age of 23 with the Class-B Flint Vehicles of the Michigan–Ontario League. In seven games that season, Carnegie batted .219 with seven hits, one double and one home run. A case of appendicitis forced Carnegie to quit baseball for the next several years.

Carnegie returned to baseball in 1927, when he joined the Dormont, Pennsylvania baseball team. The team was a member of the Allegheny County semi-professional baseball league. On June 5, 1927, he was batting .456 with eight doubles and one triple. Fellow teammates of the Dormont team included former Major League Baseball (MLB) players Frank Mills and Ed Barney. Later that June, Carnegie joined the McKeesport, Pennsylvania baseball team who were members of the same semi-pro league. The Pittsburgh Press noted that Carnegie started slow with the McKeesport team; however, he started playing better going into July. Through July 19, 1927, Carnegie led the league with nine doubles and 14 runs. He joined the Johnstown, Pennsylvania baseball team after they issued an SOS for an emergency outfielder in late-July. Carnegie finished the season second in the league in extra base hits with 24.

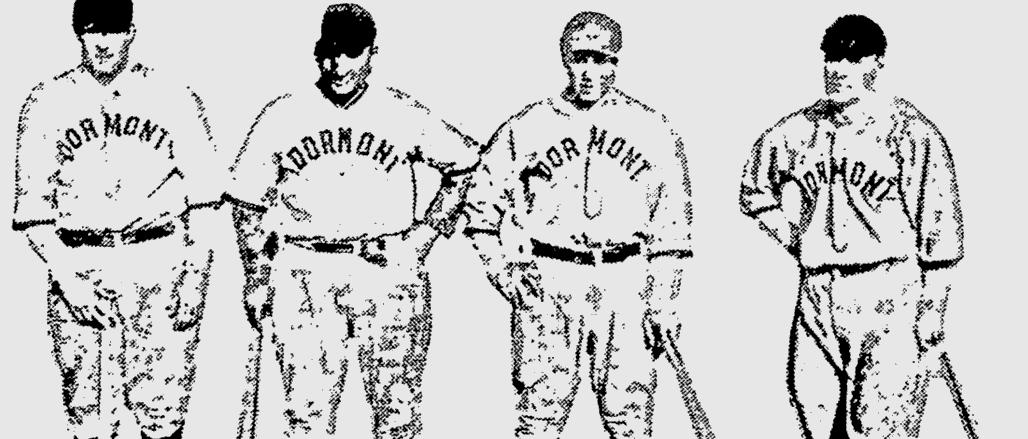
Ollie Carnegie (third from the left) pictured with teammates of the Dormont, Pennsylvania semi-professional baseball team.

In 1928, Carnegie continued his tenure in the semi-professional Allegheny County league after he signed with the Beaver Falls Elks. The Elks represented Beaver Falls, Pennsylvania. On June 22, 1928, The Pittsburgh Press noted that Carnegie was a "home run idol" to fans. On July 5, 1928, Carnegie hit two home runs and two singles in a game against the Canton, Pennsylvania baseball team. In September 1928, Carnegie joined the South Hills baseball team. In March 1929, it was announced that Carnegie would join the Pitcairn, Pennsylvania baseball team. In June 1929, as a member of the Homewood baseball team, Carnegie hit the longest home run ever at Dormont High Field according to The Pittsburgh Press. In 1930, he continued playing with the Pitcairn Tossers of the Allegheny County league. During his time in Allegheny County's sandlot league, Carnegie received the nickname "Bambino" and they described him as the "sandlot 'Babe Ruth'". Also during his tenure, Carnegie was described as the "most dangerous and longest clouter in the City semi-pro baseball loop" by The Pittsburgh Press.

Carnegie was reportedly highly sought after by many MLB and minor league teams during his time in the Allegheny County league. It was said that he refused to leave the Pittsburgh area. The Pittsburgh Press said that Carnegie did play in the Middle Atlantic League after the Johnstown Johnnies' requested an emergency outfielder after their regular player went out with an illness. They also reported that Carnegie had a chance to stay in the Middle Atlantic League, but returned home instead.

== Professional career ==
=== Hazleton Mountaineers ===
On March 30, 1931, it was announced the Pittsburgh Pirates owned Class-B Hazleton Mountaineers offered Carnegie a contract. Carnegie, who turned down professional baseball contracts before, had to think about the deal before announcing his decision. Initially, Carnegie declined to join professional baseball and planned to return to the Allegheny County semi-professional league. Later in the season, he decided to join Hazleton. A reason later given for why Carnegie accepted the Hazleton contract was because he lost his job with Pennsylvania Railroad in the midst of the Great Depression. With the Mountaineers in 1931, he batted .354 with 80 hits, 15 doubles and 18 home runs in 58 games played. Despite having only 226 at-bats, Carnegie's 18 home runs were the second most on the team behind Pat Wright, who had 19 home runs in twice as many at-bats. Carnegie led the New York–Penn League in slugging percentage that season with a .659 percentage total.

=== Buffalo Bisons ===
On September 8, 1931, Carnegie was sold to the Double-A Buffalo Bisons of the International League for an undisclosed amount of money, some of which Carnegie received. Carnegie played 15 games with Buffalo that season and batted .345 with 19 hits five doubles and two triples. During the 1931 off-season, one day after finishing his season with the Bisons, he re-joined the Allegheny County semi-professional league with the Dormont, Pennsylvania baseball team. Before the 1932 season, Carnegie re-signed with the Bisons and received an increase in pay. After signing his contract, he reported to Fort Lauderdale, Florida for spring training. While the team was in spring training, The Gazette described Carnegie as the "greatest find to appear in the camp of the Buffalo Bisons in the last decade". During the season, Bisons' manager Ray Schalk said that Carnegie would soon get a promotion to Major League Baseball and it was reported that the Chicago White Sox were interested in Carnegie. Also that season, Bisons' president, Frank J. Offermann, said of Carnegie that "a finer character has never donned a ball uniform". In 1932, Carnegie batted .333 with 169 hits, 31 doubles, three triples and 36 home runs in 137 games played. Carnegie was third in the International League that season in home runs and slugging percentage (.618).

In February 1933, Carnegie re-signed with the Buffalo Bisons, but was initially "dissatisfied" with his contract. On the season, Carnegie batted .317 with 164 hits, 33 doubles, six triples and 29 home runs in 147 games played. Carnegie was third in the International League that season in home runs and fourth in slugging percentage (.573). During the 1934 season, Carnegie did not report to Buffalo until May and played with the Dormont, Pennsylvania semi-professional team in the mean time. With the Bisons that season, Carnegie batted .335 with 154 hits, 26 doubles, five triples and 31 home runs. He was third in the International League in home runs that season. After the season, Carnegie was a member of a Pittsburgh-area all-star team which included Dizzy Dean and Paul Dean who played against the Pittsburgh Crawfords, a Negro league baseball team.

On May 29, 1935, Carnegie drove in five runs against the Toronto Maple Leafs. On the season, Carnegie batted .293 with 171 hits, 39 doubles, five triples and 37 home runs in 154 games. Amongst International League hitters in 1935, Carnegie was second in home runs and was fifth in doubles. Carnegie was sidelined for much of the 1936 season due to an ankle injury. He was replaced in the Bisons lineup by Johnny Dickshot. Despite the injury, Carnegie did manage to play 74 games and batted .244 with 47 hits, six doubles, one triple and four home runs. In 1937, Carnegie batted .308 with 151 hits, 23 doubles, six triples and 21 home runs in 134 games played. Carnegie was tied for fifth in the league in home runs with Woody Abernathy, George McQuinn and Les Powers.

Before the 1938 regular season, while with the Bisons in spring training, Carnegie was straggling to meet expectations. However, during the season, The Beaver County Times noted that Carnegie was once again one of the premier players in the International League. On the season, Carnegie batted .330 with 182 hits, 35 doubles, three triples and 45 home runs in 142 games. Amongst all International League batters that season, Carnegie was first in home runs, runs batted in (136) and total bases (358); second in slugging percentage (.649); third in hits; and sixth in doubles. His 45 home runs were, at the time, the fourth highest home run total in the International League's history. It was asserted by The Pittsburgh Press that if Carnegie had started playing professional baseball in the mid-1920s when he was younger, he would have been "sensational". Carnegie won the 1938 International League Most Valuable Player Award after the season.

On April 4, 1939, it was announced Carnegie would re-sign with the Bisons, making it his ninth season with the team. During the 1939 season, in a game against the Newark Bears on August 5, Carnegie was formally presented with the 1938 International League Most Valuable Player Award. Carnegie batted .294 with 146 hits, 25 doubles, three triples and 29 home runs in 143 games played during the 1939 season. He led the International League in home runs that season. On March 13, 1940, Carnegie signed his tenth contract with the Bisons. On the season, Carnegie batted .281 with 93 hits, 16 doubles, three triples and 15 home runs in 97 games played. In 1942, Carnegie continued playing with Buffalo and batted .257 with 38 hits, five doubles, one triple and seven home runs in 71 games played. On January 22, 1942, Carnegie was given an unconditional release from the Bisons, a move in which Buffalo general manager John Stiglmeier said "was the hardest thing I ever had to do".

=== Later career ===
On March 23, 1942, Carnegie signed with the Class-D Lockport White Sox of the PONY League. The 43-year-old Carnegie batted .310 with 119 hits, 20 doubles, five triples and 16 home runs in 105 games played that season, finishing sixth in the league in home runs that campaign. After an absence from professional baseball in 1943, Carnegie returned in 1944 with the Class-D Jamestown Falcons as a player-manager. It was Carnegie's managerial debut. In 96 game that season, Carnegie batted .305 with 97 hits, 17 doubles, four triples and four home runs. As a team, the Falcons went 70–54, good enough for second place. They swept the Lockport Cubs 4–0 in the post-season finals. In 1945, Carnegie returned to the Double-A Buffalo Bisons. The New York Times reported that Carnegie was brought in to coach. In 39 games that year, Carnegie batted .301 with 20 runs, 28 hits, five doubles, one triple, four home runs and 21 runs batted in. That season would prove to be Carnegie's final season as a player, however, he did stay around the game in Buffalo as a scout for the Bisons.

== Later life ==
Carnegie, who resided in Buffalo, New York after his playing career, was hospitalized at Millard Fillmore Hospital in September 1967 for unknown reasons. On October 4, 1976, Carnegie died in Buffalo, New York at the age of 77.

== Legacy ==
Carnegie has been noted by many, including the Artvoice and the Society for American Baseball Research, as one of the best players to ever play for the Buffalo Bisons. Over Carnegie's professional career, he batted .309 with 1,665 hits, 302 doubles, 48 triples, 297 home runs, a .548 slugging percentage and 2954 total bases. Carnegie only played outfield in his career. Carnegie is the International League all-time leader in home runs with 258 and runs batted in with 1,044. He received the International League's Most Valuable Player Award in 1938 and is the only winner since to have never had an appearance in Major League Baseball. Pettibones Grille, a Buffalo, New York restaurant, serves a cheesesteak sandwich called "The Ollie Carnegie", which is located on their "Hall of Fame Bistro" menu.

Carnegie has been enshrined in the International League Hall of Fame, the Greater Buffalo Sports Hall of Fame and the Buffalo Baseball Hall of Fame. He was an inaugural member of the International League Hall of Fame and the Buffalo Baseball Hall of Fame in 1942 and 1985 respectively. The number six Carnegie wore while he was a member of the Buffalo Bisons was retired by the team. Carnegie is the Buffalo Bisons all-time leader in home runs (285), runs batted in (1,044), games played (1,273) and hits (1,362). He is also tied for first all-time on the Bisons in doubles (249). Carnegie led the Bisons in home runs and runs batted in seven times.

During his tenure in the Allegheny County semi-professional baseball league, local papers described Carnegie as the "sandlot Babe Ruth" and nicknamed him the "Bambino". In Close Shave: The Life and Times of Baseball's Sal Maglie, author James Szalontai compared Carnegie to Ted Williams. Carnegie never played in Major League Baseball. Carnegie did; however, spark some major league team's interest, but was eventually written off as too old since he did not start playing professional baseball regularly until he was 32 years old. The duo of Carnegie and Bisons teammate Ollie Tucker were known as "The Italian Connection" and "The Home Run Twins". The Pittsburgh Press described Carnegie as "one of Western Pennsylvania's greatest batters".

=== Accomplishments and awards ===
- International League and Buffalo Bisons all-time leader in home runs (258)
- International League and Buffalo Bisons all-time leader in runs batted in (1,044)
- Buffalo Bisons all-time leader in doubles (249)
- Buffalo Bisons all-time leader in games played (1,273)
- Buffalo Bisons all-time leader in hits (1,362)
- Buffalo Bisons single-season leader in home runs (45)
- 1931 New York–Penn League leader in slugging percentage (.659)
- Member of the 1933 Governors' Cup champion Buffalo Bisons
- Member of the 1936 International League Pennant winning Buffalo Bisons
- 1938 International League leader in home runs (45)
- 1939 International League leader in runs batted in (136)
- 1938 International League Most Valuable Player
- 1939 International League leader in home runs (29)
- 1942 International League Hall of Fame inductee
- 1985 Buffalo Baseball Hall of Fame inductee
- 1992 Buffalo Sports Hall of Fame inductee
- Buffalo Bisons #6 retired

== Personal ==
Carnegie resided in Hays, a district in Pittsburgh, Pennsylvania. Carnegie was from Italian American ancestry. Carnegie married Anna Polasko of Braddock, Pennsylvania and with her, he fathered two children; Ollie Carnegie, Jr. and Elaine Carnegie. During the off-seasons, Carnegie hunted and fished. Also during the off-season, Carnegie worked in a steel mill and received the nickname the "Iron Man". During the 1941 off-season, the Pittsburgh Post-Gazette interviewed Carnegie about his winter job at Republic Steel patrolling the plant equipped with a Colt Single Action Army. Carnegie told the newspaper, "this is the kind of a job a player should have in the off-season—lots of walking".

== See also ==
- List of International League Hall of Fame inductees
