= Johnny Dickshot =

American baseball player (1910–1997)

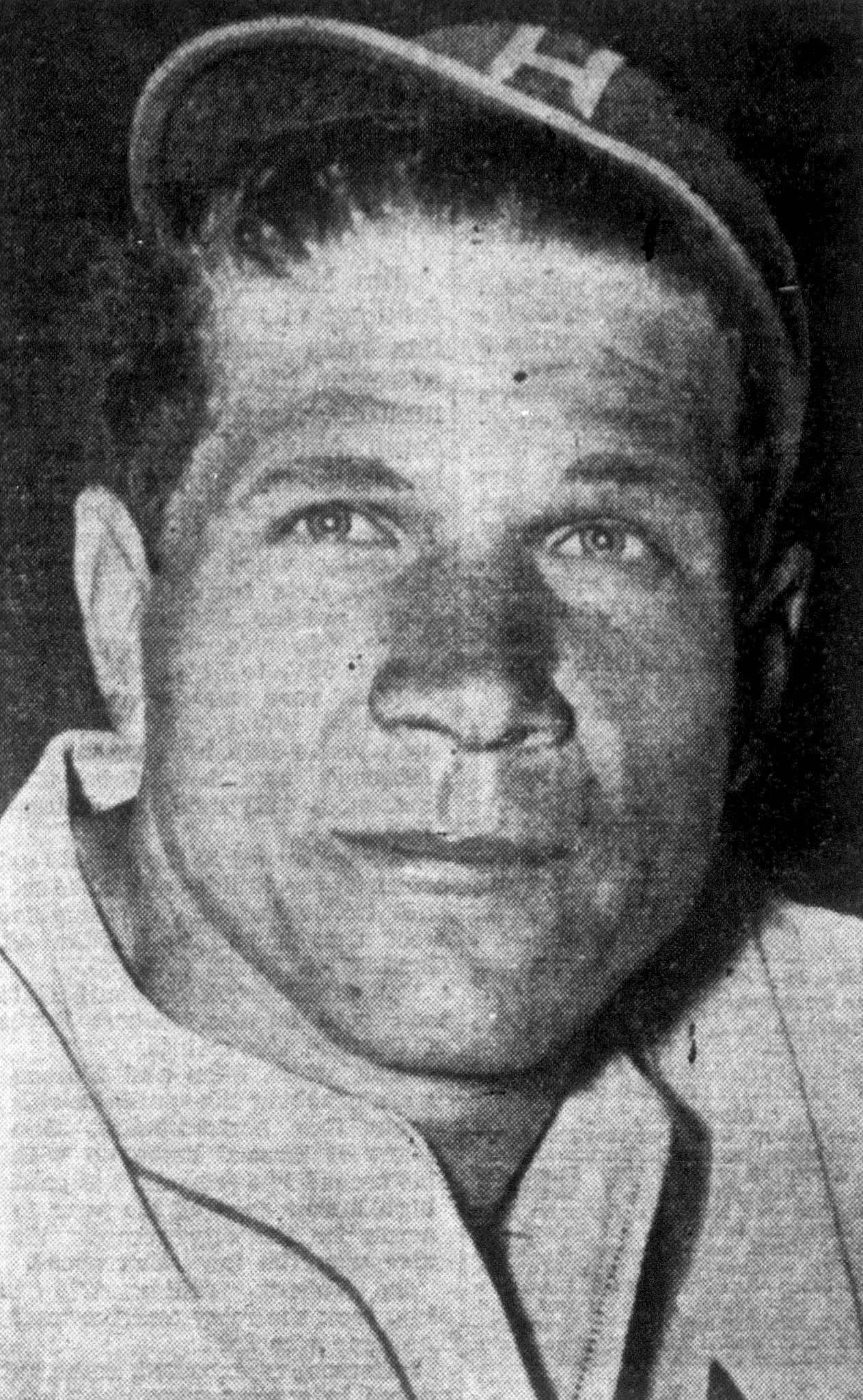
- Dickshot, circa 1942
- Left fielder
- Born: January 24, 1910; Waukegan, Illinois, U.S.
- Died: November 4, 1997 (aged 87); Waukegan, Illinois, U.S.
- Batted: Right Threw: Right

MLB debut
- April 16, 1936, for the Pittsburgh Pirates

Last MLB appearance
- September 25, 1945, for the Chicago White Sox

MLB statistics
- Batting average: .276
- Home runs: 7
- Runs batted in: 116
- Stats at Baseball Reference

Teams
- Pittsburgh Pirates (1936–1938); New York Giants (1939); Chicago White Sox (1944–1945)

John Oscar Dickshot (born John Oscar Dicksus, (Note: Dickshot's original last name is listed in The Baseball Encyclopedia as "Dicksus". The name has also been given as "Diksus" and "Dicksas".) January 24, 1910 (Note: Though Dickshot's date of birth was reported as January 24, 1912, and his high school graduation as 1930 during his playing career, The Baseball Encyclopedia lists his date of birth as January 24, 1910, and contemporary reports indicated that he graduated from high school in 1928.) – November 4, 1997), nicknamed "Ugly" Johnny Dickshot, was an American professional baseball left fielder. He played in Major League Baseball for the Pittsburgh Pirates, the New York Giants, and the Chicago White Sox. His professional career, including the seasons he spent in Minor League Baseball, ran from 1930 to 1947. He received the nickname "Ugly" because he proclaimed himself to be "the ugliest man in baseball" during his career.

From Waukegan, Illinois, Dickshot began playing as a semi-professional and in the minor leagues in the early 1930s. He was scouted and signed by the Pirates in 1934, and they promoted him to the major leagues in 1936. The Pirates gave Dickshot a significant role in 1937, but played him sparingly in 1938. A strong season in the minor leagues in 1939 earned him a brief trial with the Giants. Dickshot played in the minor leagues until the White Sox acquired him for the 1944 and 1945 seasons. He returned to the minor leagues in 1946 and his career ended in 1947.

== Early life ==
John Oscar Dicksus was born in Waukegan, Illinois, on January 24, 1910. He was of German and Lithuanian heritage. His father worked as a foreman in a local steel mill, where the timekeepers misheard his last name, registering him as "Dickshot". The family adopted it as their new surname. (Note: According to other stories told, an announcer mispronounced his name or sportswriters misheard and misreported his last name, and after he tried without success to correct it, he adopted it as his last name.) He had a sister, Martha, who also played baseball in Waukegan.

When he was young, Dickshot's skull was fractured by older children throwing bottles in his backyard; he lost consciousness for three days and doctors inserted a metal plate in his head. During his youth, Dickshot worked a number of jobs, starting with delivering newspapers when he was in grammar school. He also worked in the steel mill with his father, and spent some of his free time watching the Chicago Cubs play at Wrigley Field.

Dickshot attended Waukegan High School. He did not participate in sports until his senior year, as his father had insisted until then that he should work after school. As a senior, he lettered in baseball, football, basketball, and swimming. In football, Dickshot was named All-State as a halfback. He graduated from high school in 1928.

== Career ==
=== Early career (1930–1935) ===
Dickshot began playing professional baseball in 1930 with the Dubuque Tigers of the Class D Mississippi Valley League. He had a .309 batting average in 19 games played with Dubuque. He did not play professionally in 1931, staying in Waukegan to work for his family in the steel mill during the Great Depression as his father had fallen ill. He played semi-professional baseball locally in 1931, and Nick Keller, the Illinois State Representative from Waukegan who also coached the team, scouted Dickshot for the Milwaukee Brewers of the Class AA American Association. The Brewers signed Dickshot to a contract in September 1931, and Dickshot attended spring training with the Brewers in 1932. The Brewers assigned him to the Fort Smith Twins of the Class C Western Association. In July, the Twins relocated to Muskogee, Oklahoma, as the Muskogee Chiefs, and a week later, the Brewers reassigned Dickshot to the Rock Island Islanders of the Mississippi Valley League. Dickshot batted .262 with 11 stolen bases in 71 games for Fort Smith / Muskogee, and batted .264 with 34 stolen bases in 66 games for Rock Island.

Milwaukee exercised its option on Dickshot after the 1932 season, and assigned him to the San Antonio Missions of the Class A Texas League at the start of the 1933 season. Though he was batting .397, the Missions released him in late April to make room on their roster for Larry Bettencourt, and he signed with the Fort Worth Cats of the Texas League. The Cats sent Dickshot to the Waco Bruins of the Class C Dixie League in late-May, but Dickshot refused to report to Waco. He returned to Waukeagan, where he played semi-professional baseball.

A free agent heading into the 1934 season, Dickshot signed with Rock Island, now in the Class A Western League. At the end of May, Dickshot was released by Rock Island, and he signed with Cedar Rapids Raiders, also of the Western League. He batted .343 with 16 home runs and 20 stolen bases for Rock Island and Cedar Rapids. While he played for Cedar Rapids, a scout for the Pittsburgh Pirates of Major League Baseball's National League noticed Dickshot, and signed him. Cedar Rapids sold Dickshot to the Little Rock Travelers of the Class A Southern Association for the 1935 season, and he batted .309 for Little Rock. The Pirates recalled Dickshot to their roster after the 1935 season.

=== Pittsburgh Pirates (1936–1938) ===
Dickshot made the Pirates' Opening Day roster for the 1936 season as a reserve outfielder, as Lloyd Waner was recovering from pneumonia. He made his major league debut as a pinch hitter on April 16, and batted 2-for-9 (.222) in nine games for the Pirates. With a May 15 deadline to reduce their roster size, Pittsburgh demoted Dickshot to the Buffalo Bisons of the International League. Dickshot batted .365 for the Bisons, the third-highest average in the league behind only Phil Weintraub and Smead Jolley, and led the International League in stolen bases with 35. After the Bisons won the league's championship, the Pirates promoted Dickshot back to the major leagues. He did not appear in another game for Pittsburgh during the 1936 season.

In spring training with the Pirates in 1937, Dickshot competed with Woody Jensen to be the starting left fielder, and Pie Traynor, the Pirates' manager, chose Dickshot over Jensen. Traynor wanted Dickshot, who was right-handed, in the lineup for balance, as Jensen, Lloyd and Paul Waner, Gus Suhr, and Arky Vaughan all were left-handed batters. Dickshot struggled early in the season and was benched after he dropped a fly ball that cost the Pirates the game on May 23. He was put back in the lineup in late June. Dickshot collided with Vaughan, the shortstop, in a game in July, resulting in Vaughan tearing cartilage in his knee. When Vaughan returned to the Pirates lineup in August, he replaced Dickshot in left field. Dickshot batted .254 with three home runs, but no stolen bases, in 84 games. His .950 fielding percentage was the third-lowest in the National League, ahead of Chuck Klein and Johnny Moore.

After Dickshot's disappointing 1937 season, the Pirates acquired Johnny Rizzo to compete with Dickshot for playing time in left field. Dickshot played sparingly for Pittsburgh in 1938, batting .229 in 29 games, with three stolen bases and no home runs. After the 1938 season, the Pirates traded Dickshot and Al Todd with $30,000 to the Boston Bees for Ray Mueller.

=== New York Giants and minors (1939–1943) ===
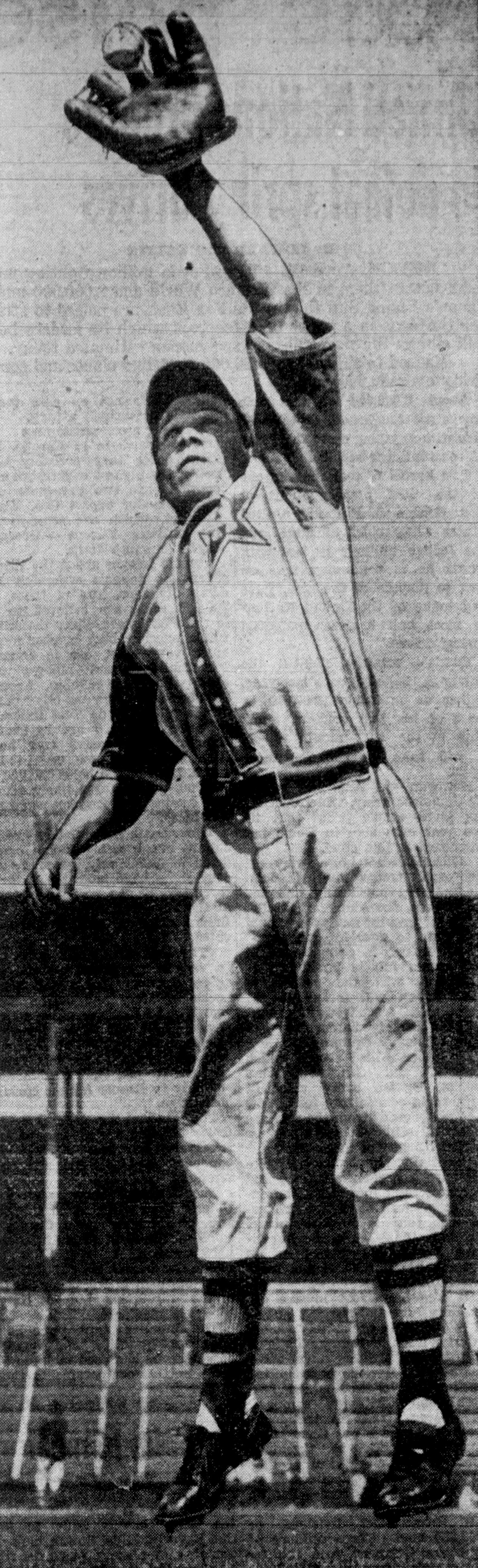
Dickshot in 1942

The Bees gave Dickshot the opportunity to compete to be their starting center fielder in spring training. However, Johnny Cooney, Max West, and Debs Garms, the Bees starting outfielders in the 1938 season, returned for the 1939 season, and the Bees also acquired Al Simmons and Jimmy Outlaw during the offseason. Before the 1939 season began, Dickshot went unclaimed in waivers and the Bees sold him to the Jersey City Giants of the International League.

With Jersey City in 1939, Dickshot won the International League batting championship with a .355 average, and also led the league with 16 triples. He finished in third place in balloting for the International League Most Valuable Player Award, behind Mickey Witek and Estel Crabtree. The New York Giants promoted Dickshot to the major leagues before the end of the 1939 season, and he batted .235 in 10 games for the Giants. The Giants invited Dickshot to spring training in 1940, and he competed with Jo-Jo Moore for playing time. The Giants returned Dickshot to Jersey City for the 1940 season, and he batted .290 for Jersey City that year.

After the 1940 season, the Giants sold Dickshot and Roy Joiner to the Hollywood Stars of the Pacific Coast League (PCL) for $15,000 and the rights to Joe Hoover. Dickshot batted .298 in 1941, and batted .302 in 1942. During the 1943 season, Dickshot had a 33-game hitting streak, which earned him the Helms Athletic Foundation Athlete of the Month Award for May 1943. He finished the season with a .356 batting average, two percentage points behind Andy Pafko for the PCL batting championship. He also finished second to Pafko in the PCL Most Valuable Player Award balloting. Dickshot attributed his success in 1943 to losing 20 pounds (9.1 kg) during the previous offseason.

=== Chicago White Sox and later career (1944–1947) ===
In September 1943, the Chicago White Sox purchased him from Hollywood for $1,500 on a conditional contract for the 1944 season; Chicago would return Dickshot to Hollywood by May 1944 if he did not make the team. Dickshot had been classified as 4-F by the Selective Service System, ruling him ineligible for military service, due to the metal plate in his head. With outfielder Thurman Tucker set to join the United States Navy, and fellow outfielders Wally Moses and Guy Curtright eligible to be drafted, the White Sox added Dickshot, Hal Trosky, and Grey Clarke to add power hitting.

Dickshot had a .253 batting average with two stolen bases and no home runs in 62 games for the White Sox in 1944. The next season, Dickshot batted .302 with 18 stolen bases in 130 games; he also tied Curtright for the team lead with four home runs. His batting average was the third-best in the American League, behind Snuffy Stirnweiss and Tony Cuccinello. However, with major leaguers returning from military service at the end of World War II, the White Sox sold Dickshot back to Hollywood after the season, as they were reportedly looking for outfielders with better defensive skills.

With Hollywood in 1946, Dickshot batted .214 while playing in a reserve role. Hollywood sold him to Milwaukee in May 1946. Dickshot competed for the American Association batting championship with Milwaukee, and finished the season in fifth place with a .326 average. Dickshot played for Milwaukee in 1947. He batted .253 in 37 games, until they released him in June.

=== "Ugliest man in baseball" ===
Dickshot often referred to himself as the "ugliest man in baseball" during his career. According to one story told about him, a fan in Little Rock asked to shake Dickshot's hand and approach the stands with him, telling him "I want my wife to see you, so she'll appreciate me". Dickshot had a sense of humor about this, once saying: "Don't mind my looks; I've got personality". When people joked about his looks while he was with the Giants, Dickshot said, "Boys, I'm like a mountain, big, rugged and in my way – beautiful!"

Choosing the "All-Ugly Team" for each league was an annual tradition in minor league baseball, and Dickshot was named to the Southern Association's All-Ugly team in 1935. The next year, Dickshot named the members of the International League's "All-Ugly" team; he chose himself as the left fielder and team captain. When he played for Pittsburgh, the media began to call him "The Ugly Duckling". Mike Ryba named Dickshot to the International League's "All-Ugly" team in 1939. Dickshot continued the tradition in the PCL in 1941 and 1943.

== Personal life ==
Dickshot married Julie (née Kuzmickus) of Waukegan on October 12, 1936. They had one son and four daughters. During the baseball offseasons, Dickshot continued to work in the steel mill in Waukegan. After his retirement, Dickshot operated a tavern in Waukegan called Dickshot's Dugout and organized slowpitch exhibitions.

Dickshot died in his home on November 4, 1997.
