= Ray Pepper =

American baseball player (1905–1996)

- Outfielder
- Born: August 5, 1905; Decatur, Alabama, U.S.
- Died: March 24, 1996 (aged 90); Belle Mina, Alabama, U.S.
- Batted: Right Threw: Right

MLB debut
- April 15, 1932, for the St. Louis Cardinals

Last MLB appearance
- September 25, 1936, for the St. Louis Browns

MLB statistics
- Batting average: .281
- Home runs: 14
- Runs batted in: 170
- Stats at Baseball Reference

Teams
- St. Louis Cardinals (1932–1933); St. Louis Browns (1934–1936)

Raymond Watson Pepper (August 5, 1905 – March 24, 1996) was an American Major League Baseball outfielder. He played all or part of five seasons in the majors, from 1932 until 1936, for the St. Louis Cardinals and St. Louis Browns. Pepper's only season as a regular was 1934, when he finished 10th in the American League in runs batted in with 101 and batted .298. However, he only had 69 RBI in the rest of his career combined. Pepper holds the record for the least RBIs in a career for a player with a 100 RBI season.
