= Frankie Kelleher =

American baseball player (1916–1979)

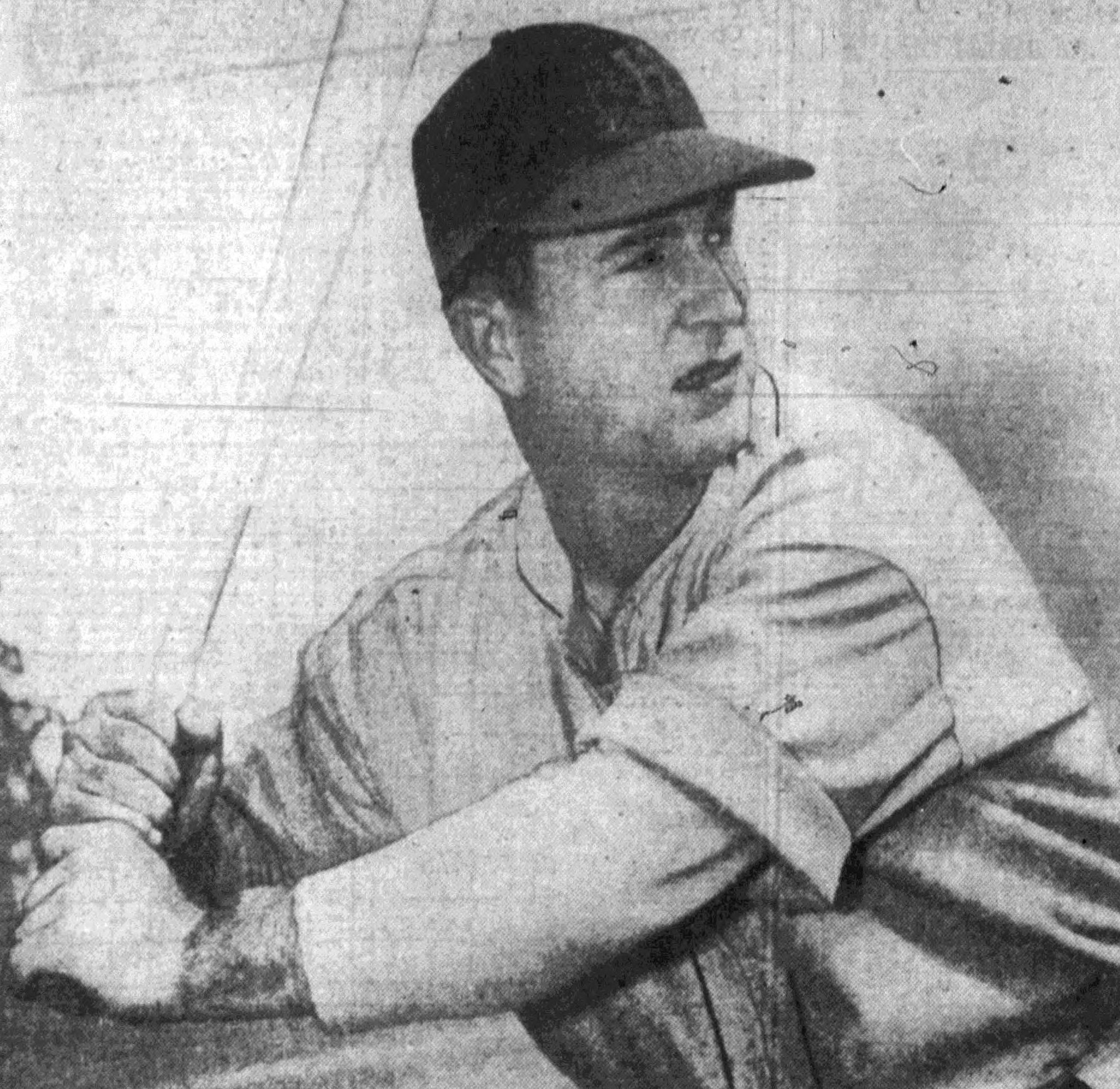
- Kelleher, circa 1947
- Outfielder
- Born: August 22, 1916; San Francisco, California, U.S.
- Died: April 13, 1979 (aged 62); Stockton, California, U.S.
- Batted: Right Threw: Right

MLB debut
- July 18, 1942, for the Cincinnati Reds

Last MLB appearance
- June 14, 1943, for the Cincinnati Reds

MLB statistics
- Batting average: .167
- Home runs: 3
- Runs batted in: 12
- Stats at Baseball Reference

Teams
- Cincinnati Reds (1942–1943)

Francis Eugene Kelleher (August 22, 1916 – April 13, 1979) was an American outfielder in Major League Baseball. He played for the Cincinnati Reds.

For his success in the minor leagues, Kelleher is a member of the Pacific Coast League Hall of Fame.
