= Red Barrett =

American baseball player (1915–1990)

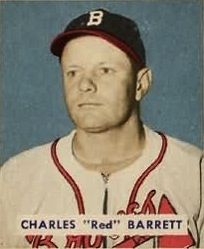
- Barrett's 1949 Bowman Gum baseball card
- Pitcher
- Born: February 14, 1915; Santa Barbara, California, U.S.
- Died: July 28, 1990 (aged 75); Wilson, North Carolina, U.S.
- Batted: Right Threw: Right

MLB debut
- September 15, 1937, for the Cincinnati Reds

Last MLB appearance
- September 29, 1949, for the Boston Braves

MLB statistics
- Win–loss record: 69–69
- Earned run average: 3.53
- Strikeouts: 333
- Stats at Baseball Reference

Teams
- Cincinnati Reds (1937–1940); Boston Braves (1943–1945); St. Louis Cardinals (1945–1946); Boston Braves (1947–1949)

Career highlights and awards
- All-Star (1945); NL wins leader (1945)

Charles Henry "Red" Barrett (February 14, 1915 – July 28, 1990) was an American Major League Baseball pitcher who played 11 total career seasons in the National League. He played for the Cincinnati Reds, Boston Braves and St. Louis Cardinals. He once pitched the shortest complete game by fewest pitches (58) in history.

Barrett died at the age of 75 in Wilson, North Carolina.

== Career ==
Barrett was right-handed. He stood 5'11". Playing for three teams over 11 years, Barrett was a .500 pitcher, winning and losing 69 games. Career totals for 253 games include 149 games started, 67 complete games, 11 shutouts, 62 games finished, and 7 saves. His lifetime ERA was 3.53.

On August 10, 1944, throwing for the Boston Braves against his former team the Cincinnati Reds, Barrett pitched a 2–0 shutout at Crosley Field. He faced 29 batters (two more than the minimum, having surrendered two hits, walked no one and struck out no one, with no defensive errors behind him), setting a complete game (and a nine-inning game) record by throwing only 58 pitches, an average of exactly two pitches per batter. It was also the shortest night game in history, and the shortest road-team win in history, lasting just 1 hour and 15 minutes. The game was umpired behind home plate by the noted umpire Jocko Conlan.

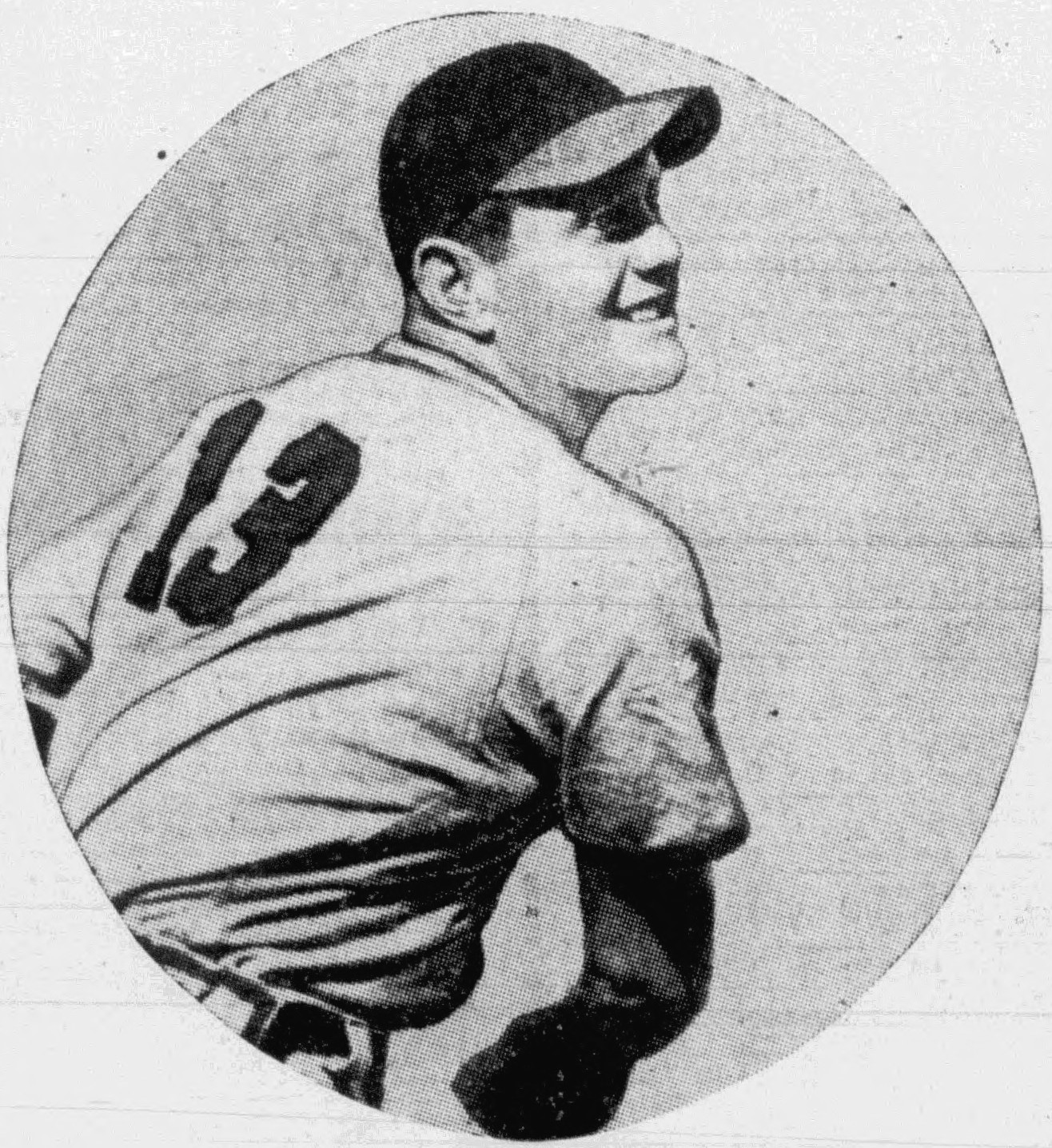
Barrett, circa 1946

In 1945, he led the Cardinals to second place in the National League, posting a team best 21 wins and 9 losses. For the year, his combined 23–12 record for the Braves and Cardinals with a 3.00 earned run average led the league in wins. He was named to the AP National League All-Star team and finished third in NL Most Valuable Player voting.

As a member of the St. Louis Cardinals, Barrett appeared on the cover of Life Magazine on April 1, 1946.

In 1948, Barrett was a relief pitcher for the Braves in two games of the World Series, allowing no runs in 3 2/3 innings.

== See also ==
- List of Major League Baseball annual wins leaders
