= Ripper Collins (baseball) =

American baseball player (1904–1970)

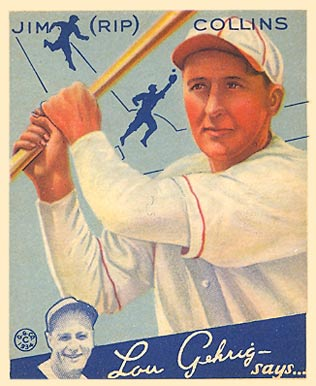
- First baseman
- Born: March 30, 1904; Altoona, Pennsylvania, U.S.
- Died: April 15, 1970 (aged 66); New Haven, New York, U.S.
- Batted: Switch Threw: Left

MLB debut
- April 18, 1931, for the St. Louis Cardinals

Last MLB appearance
- September 28, 1941, for the Pittsburgh Pirates

MLB statistics
- Batting average: .296
- Home runs: 135
- Runs batted in: 659
- Stats at Baseball Reference

Teams
- St. Louis Cardinals (1931–1936); Chicago Cubs (1937–1938); Pittsburgh Pirates (1941)

Career highlights and awards
- 3× All-Star (1935–1937); 2× World Series champion (1931, 1934); NL home run leader (1934)

James Anthony "Ripper" Collins (March 30, 1904 – April 15, 1970) was an American professional baseball player, coach and scout. He played in Major League Baseball as a first baseman for the St. Louis Cardinals, Chicago Cubs, and the Pittsburgh Pirates. A switch hitter who threw left-handed, Collins was listed as 5 feet 9 inches (1.75 m) tall and weighed 165 pounds (75 kg), during his playing days. Despite his stature, he was a power hitter who in 1934 co-led the National League (NL) with 35 home runs (HR).

The nickname "Ripper" developed during an on-field incident that occurred when Jimmy was a young player. A ball rocketed off his bat and struck a nail protruding from the outfield fence; it caused the cover to partially tear. When asked who hit the ball, the retrieving outfielder saw the ball hanging and said, "It was the ripper."

== Baseball career ==
Born in Altoona, Pennsylvania, Collins grew up in nearby Nanty Glo, where he was a standout in sandlot baseball, in his youth. He started his Minor League Baseball career in 1923, playing in various leagues for eight seasons. Then, in 1930, Collins hit .376 with 40 HR for the Rochester Red Wings of the International League (IL). His 180 runs batted in (RBI) set an IL record.

For that performance, Collins was called up to the big league St. Louis Cardinals, in 1931. As a member of the Gashouse Gang Cardinals teams, Collins had a breakout season in 1934 with 35 homers (sharing the league's long-ball championship with future Baseball Hall of Famer Mel Ott), 128 RBI, and a .333 batting average (BA). That year, he also hit .367 in the World Series, which the Cardinals won in seven games.

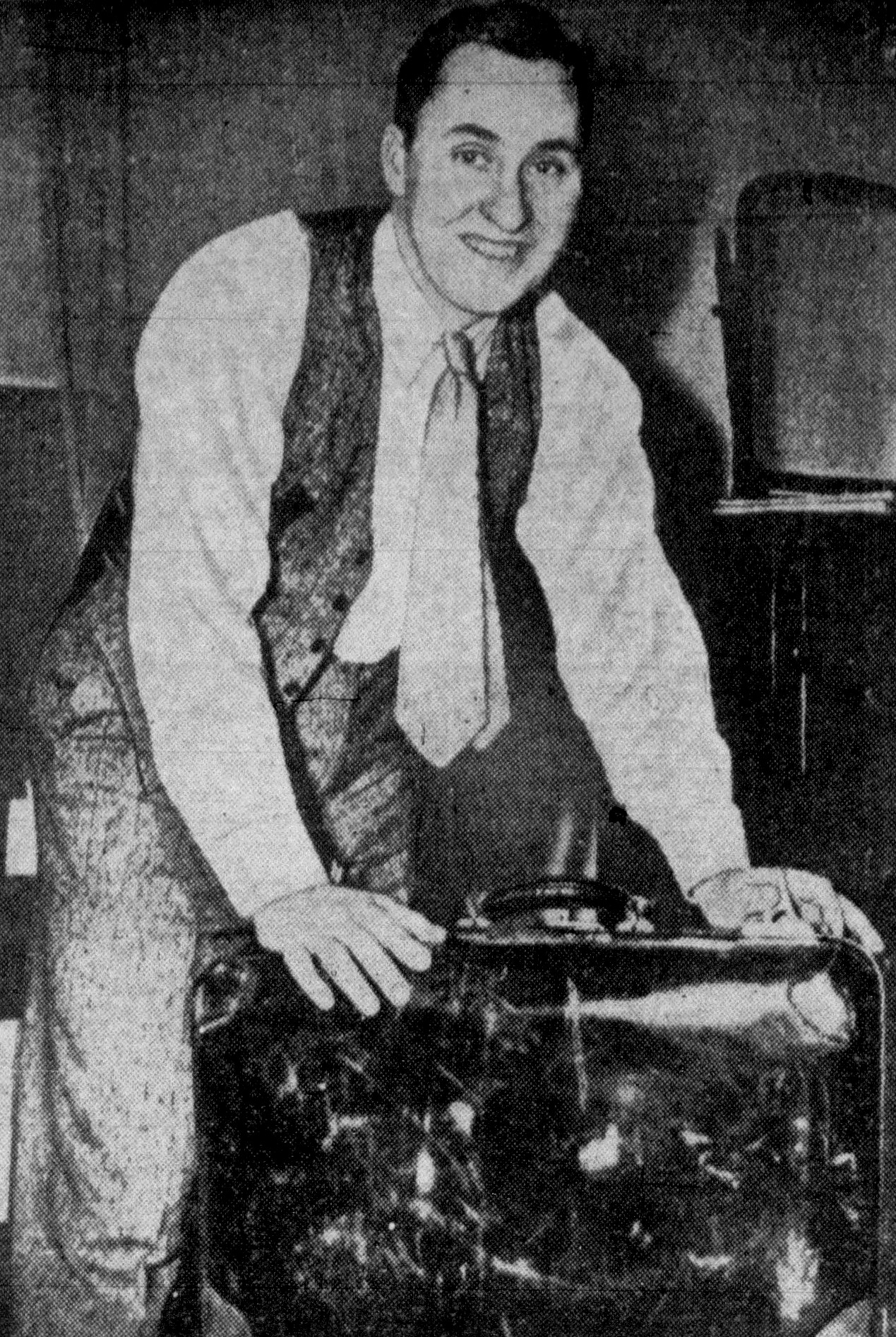
Collins unpacking his bags in Albany, New York after being named manager of the Albany Senators in 1942.

Collins is the only first baseman to have twice recorded no putouts in a nine-inning game – once for the 1935 Cardinals and again for the 1937 Chicago Cubs. Between his time with the Cubs and the Pirates, Collins spent two years with the Los Angeles Angels, playing in 346 games, during that time.

In 1,084 games played, Collins compiled a .296 BA (1,121 for 3,784), with 615 runs scored, 135 HR, and 659 RBI with 205 doubles, 65 triples and 356 bases on balls. His on-base percentage (OBP) was .360, with a .492 slugging percentage (SLG). Collins hit better than .300 four times in a nine-year major league career. In 13 World Series games, he batted .277 (13 for 47). Defensively, Collins recorded a .991 regular season fielding percentage.

Collins played in the Pacific Coast League and Eastern League, after his big league career was over. In 1944, he was named Minor League Player of the Year as the player-manager of the Albany Senators of the Eastern League. That season — at the age of 40 — Collins hit .396 with a league-leading 40 doubles.

Collins returned to the major leagues as a member of the Cubs' College of Coaches from 1961–63, and was a scout for the Cardinals at the time of his death (in 1970, at age 66).

== See also ==
- List of Major League Baseball annual home run leaders
