= Jim Gleeson =

American baseball player (1912–1996)

- Outfielder
- Born: March 5, 1912; Kansas City, Missouri, U.S.
- Died: May 1, 1996 (aged 84); Kansas City, Missouri, U.S.
- Batted: Switch Threw: Right

MLB debut
- April 25, 1936, for the Cleveland Indians

Last MLB appearance
- May 5, 1942, for the Cincinnati Reds

MLB statistics
- Batting average: .263
- Home runs: 16
- Runs batted in: 154
- Stats at Baseball Reference

Teams
- Cleveland Indians (1936); Chicago Cubs (1939–1940); Cincinnati Reds (1941–1942)

James Joseph Gleeson (March 5, 1912 – May 1, 1996) was an American outfielder, scout and coach in Major League Baseball. A native of Kansas City, Missouri, and a 1927 Rockhurst High School graduate, he attended Rockhurst University. As a player, he was a switch-hitter who threw right-handed, stood 6 ft 1 in (1.85 m) (185 cm) tall and weighed 190 pounds (86 kg).

Gleeson played all or parts of five seasons (1936; 1939–42) in Major League Baseball for the Cleveland Indians, Chicago Cubs and Cincinnati Reds. In his best season, for the 1940 Cubs, Gleeson appeared in 129 games, batted 485 times and made 152 hits, including 39 doubles, 11 triples, five home runs and 61 runs batted in; he batted .313 that season. Overall, Gleeson appeared in 392 Major-League games, batting .263 with 16 home runs and 154 RBI. Defensively, he posted a .972 fielding percentage playing at all three outfield positions.

He remained in the game after his playing career ended as a minor league manager, and Major League scout and coach. Although he worked for a time for his "hometown" Kansas City Athletics as a scout and Major League coach (1957), he spent much of his career in the New York Yankees' organization, serving as the first-base coach on Yogi Berra's staff during the Yanks' 1964 pennant-winning season.

He died in Kansas City at the age of 84.

| Preceded by Yogi Berra | New York Yankees first-base coach 1964 | Succeeded by Vern Benson |
