= Roy Joiner =

American baseball player (1906–1989)

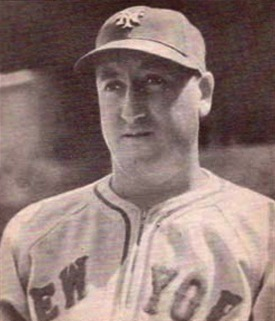
- Pitcher
- Born: October 30, 1906; Red Bluff, California, U.S.
- Died: December 26, 1989 (aged 83); Red Bluff, California, U.S.
- Batted: Left Threw: Left

MLB debut
- April 30, 1934, for the Chicago Cubs

Last MLB appearance
- September 15, 1940, for the New York Giants

MLB statistics
- Win–loss record: 3–3
- Earned run average: 5.28
- Strikeouts: 34
- Stats at Baseball Reference

Teams
- Chicago Cubs (1934–1935); New York Giants (1940)

Roy Merrill Joiner (October 30, 1906 – December 26, 1989), nicknamed "Pop", was an American professional baseball player who played pitcher in the Major Leagues from 1934 to 1940. He played for the Chicago Cubs and New York Giants. Joiner was involved in a multi-player fight during the 1935 season resulting in the only ejection of his Major League Baseball (MLB) career.

Born in Red Bluff, California, Joiner later died in the same city on December 26, 1989.
