= Mickey Witek =

American baseball player (1915-1990)

- Second baseman
- Born: December 19, 1915; Luzerne, Pennsylvania, U.S.
- Died: August 24, 1990 (aged 74); Kingston, Pennsylvania, U.S.
- Batted: Right Threw: Right

MLB debut
- April 16, 1940, for the New York Giants

Last MLB appearance
- May 1, 1949, for the New York Yankees

MLB statistics
- Batting average: .277
- Home runs: 22
- Runs batted in: 196
- Stats at Baseball Reference

Teams
- New York Giants (1940–1943, 1946–1947); New York Yankees (1949)

Nicholas Joseph "Mickey" Witek (December 19, 1915 – August 24, 1990) was an American professional baseball player. He played all or part of seven seasons in Major League Baseball during the 1940s for the New York Giants and New York Yankees, primarily as a second baseman. A native of Luzerne, Pennsylvania, he threw and batted right-handed and was listed as 5 feet 10 inches (1.78 m) tall, and weighing 170 pounds (77 kg).

== Biography ==
Witek started and ended his career with the Yankee organization, but played all but two of his 581 MLB games as a member of the National League Giants, as a second baseman, shortstop and third baseman. In 1943, as the Giants' regular second baseman, he appeared in 153 games, batting .314 (fifth in the NL), and amassing 195 hits (second in the league). He led the Senior Circuit in singles (172) and finished 12th in the National League Most Valuable Player voting. Defensively, he led NL second basemen in fielding percentage in 1942, and although he topped the league's second basemen in errors with 31 in 1943, he also led the NL in putouts and assists that season.

In 1944–45 Witek's career was interrupted while he served in the United States Coast Guard during World War II. His playing time diminished with the Giants in 1946 as Buddy Blattner claimed the regular second base job, and Witek finished his major league career with one at bat for the 1949 Yankees, as a pinch hitter, singling against Mel Parnell of the Boston Red Sox. He played one more season in the minor leagues in 1950 before retiring.
