= Woody Abernathy (outfielder) =

American baseball player (1908–1961)

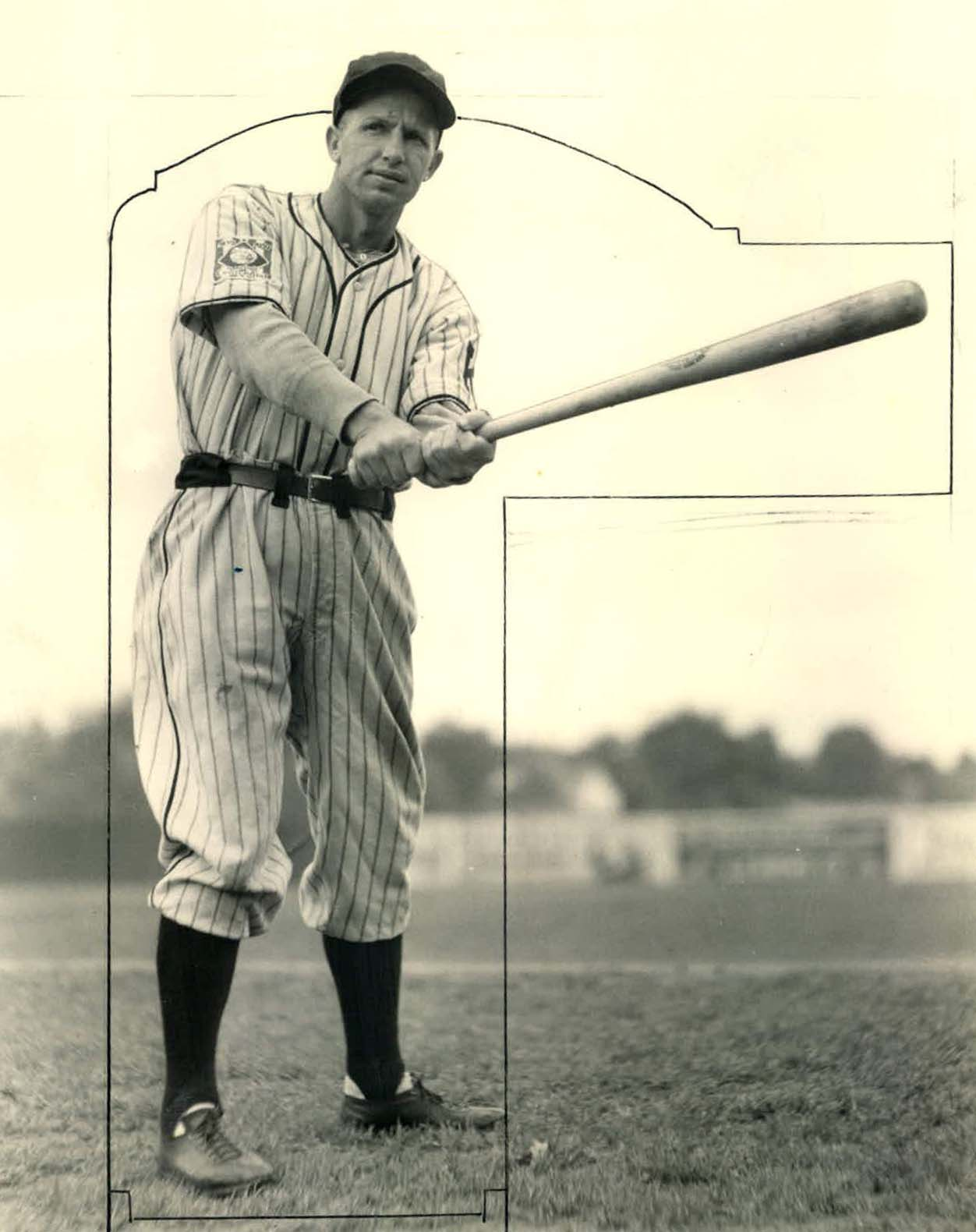
- Outfielder / First baseman
- Born: October 16, 1908; Athens, Alabama, U.S.
- Died: February 11, 1961 (aged 52)
- Batted: Left Threw: Right

MiLB statistics
- Batting average: .315
- Hits: 1997
- Home runs: 210
- Doubles: 345
- Triples: 106
- Stats at Baseball Reference

Teams
- Vicksburg Hill Billies (CSTL, 1928); Montgomery Lions (SEAL, 1929–1930); Birmingham Barons (SOUA, 1931–1933); Baltimore Orioles (IL, 1934–1937); Buffalo Bisons (IL, 1938); Knoxville Smokies (SOUA, 1939); Milwaukee Brewers (AA, 1940); St. Paul Saints (AA, 1940)

Career highlights and awards
- Led the International League in home runs (1934, 1936)

Thomas Woodley "Woody" Abernathy (October 16, 1908 – February 11, 1961) was an American professional baseball player whose career spanned 13 seasons in minor league baseball. Over that time, Abernathy played for multiple teams in multiple leagues including the Class-D Vicksburg Hill Billies (1928) of the Cotton States League; the Class-B Montgomery Lions (1929–1930) of the Southeastern League; the Class-A Birmingham Barons (1931–1933) of the Southern Association; the Double-A Baltimore Orioles (1934–1937) and the Double-A Buffalo Bisons (1938) of the International League; the Class-A1 Knoxville Smokies (1939) of the Southern Association; and the Double-A Milwaukee Brewers (1940) and the St. Paul Saints (1940) of the American Association. During his career in the minors, Abernathy batted .315 with 1997 hits, 345 doubles, 106 triples and 210 home runs in 1713 games.

For college, Abernathy attended Auburn University, where he played football. During his tenure in the International League, Abernathy ranked in the top-five in home runs hit in all of his four seasons in the league, including leading twice (1934, 1936). Although Abernathy never played in Major League Baseball, his contract was purchased by the Philadelphia Phillies from the Baltimore Orioles in 1935 and spent spring training with the Phillies in 1936. During the 1938 season, while playing with the Buffalo Bisons, Abernathy suffered a fractured skull after being stuck in the head by a pitch and was hospitalized for nearly a month. Abernathy batted left-handed and threw right-handed.

== Early life ==
Thomas Woodley "Woody" Abernathy was born on October 16, 1908, in Athens, Alabama, to Thomas H. and Hortence Abernathy of Tennessee and Texas, respectively. Thomas H. Abernathy worked as a meat cutter in Jefferson, Alabama. Woody Abernathy attended Auburn University in Auburn, Alabama. While at Auburn, Abernathy was described as a "football star" by the Associated Press; however, he chose to play baseball professionally instead.

== Professional career ==
=== Early career ===
Abernathy began his professional career with the Class-D Vicksburg Hill Billies of the Cotton States League in 1928. With the Hill Billies, Abernathy batted .358 with 60 runs, 169 hits, 33 doubles, 16 triples, two home runs and six stolen bases in 123 games played. On the defensive side, Abernathy played 63 games at first base and 57 games in the outfield. He was second in the Cotton States League in triples, third in hits, sixth in doubles and ninth in batting average. In 1929, Abernathy began his tenure with the Class-B Montgomery Lions. With the Lions, he batted .339 with 172 hits, 30 doubles, 13 triples and three home runs in 138 games. Abernathy was tied for third in the Southeastern League in triples, fourth in doubles, fifth in hits and tied for seventh in batting average. During the 1930 season, while playing with the Montgomery Lions, Abernathy batted .339 with 172 hits, 22 doubles, 11 triples and four home runs in 136 games played. He finished third in the Southeastern League in hits and fourth in hits.

=== Southern Association ===
In 1931, Abernathy began playing for the Class-A Birmingham Barons of the Southern Association. In 118 games that season, Abernathy batted .311 with 133 hits, 17 doubles, 12 triples and 10 home runs. On the defensive side, Abernathy played 69 games at first base and 40 games in the outfield. Abernathy's play was noted as "some of the finest fielding and hitting in the Dixie Series" by the Associated Press after the Barons won the championship that season. During the 1932 season, with the Barons, Abernathy batted .320 with 91 hits, 12 doubles, six triples and eight home runs in 78 game. In his final season with Birmingham, 1933, Abernathy batted .322 with 186 hits, 35 doubles, 12 doubles and 10 home runs in 150 games. Abernathy played all of his defensive games (112) at first base. Abernathy was fifth in the Southern Association in hits during the 1933 season.

=== International League ===
Abernathy began his tenure in the International League with the Double-A Baltimore Orioles in 1934. Before the season, The Gazette described Abernathy as a "straight away hitter". When the Orioles were playing the Montreal Royals in a double-header in July 1934, Abernathy hit two home runs in each games, giving him four combined home runs in one day. On the season, Abernathy batted .309 with 174 hits, 24 doubles, nine triples and 32 home runs in 151 games played. He led the International League in home runs, tied with Vince Barton. During the 1935 season, still with the Baltimore team, the Philadelphia Phillies of Major League Baseball's National League traded for the rights to Abernathy. In exchange, the Orioles received US$15,000 ($352,245 in today's standards) and pitcher Harry Gumbert. Abernathy was to report to the Phillies in 1936 for spring training. At the end of the 1935 season, Abernathy batted .276 with 150 hits, 25 doubles, nine triples and 31 home runs in 149 games played. Abernathy was third in the International League in home runs.

Abernathy's signature, along with other professional player's signatures, including Tom Oliver.

In 1935, Abernathy sustained a "severe charley horse", as described by The Milwaukee Journal, while playing with the Philadelphia Phillies during spring training. In April, still with the Phillies, it was noted by the Spartanburg Herald-Journal that Abernathy's stats repeated themselves. For instance, Abernathy batted .339 in 1929 and 1930. After spring training, Abernathy returned to the Orioles as he did not make the final 25-man roster. Abernathy batted .309 with 171 hits, 24 doubles, three triples and 43 home runs in 554 games played with the Orioles in 1936. He led the International League in home runs that season. Abernathy spent his final season with the Orioles in 1937. In 148 games, he batted .284 with 155 hits, 29 doubles, two triples and 21 home runs. Abernathy was tied for fifth in the International League in home runs.

After the 1937 season, the Baltimore Orioles sold Abernathy to the Buffalo Bisons, also of the International League. During a game on August 5, 1938, while playing with the Bisons, Abernathy was stuck in the head by a baseball from the opposing pitcher and was sent to St. Joseph Hospital in Syracuse, New York, where he was initially in critical condition. The opposing pitcher who threw the injury-inflicting pitch, Jon Gee of the Syracuse Chiefs, went to the hospital after the game to see Abernathy. Abernathy, whose head was wrapped in bandages, told Gee that he knew he did not throw the pitch at him on purpose. Officially diagnosed with a fractured skull, Abernathy underwent surgery performed by Dr. Brooks McCain and was reportedly in an "improved" condition immediately afterwards. While recovering from his injuries, the Bisons and Chiefs played a benefit game for Abernathy and raised $4,000 ($91,489 in today's standards) to pay his medical bills. On September 3, 1939, Abernathy left the hospital and returned home. During the 1938 season, Abernathy batted .323 with 121 hits, 27 doubles, five triples and 21 home runs. Despite being out of play after his injury in 1938, Abernathy still managed to hit the fourth most home runs in the International League.

=== Later career ===
Abernathy made his return to the Southern Association, a league in which he played with from 1931 to 1933 with the Birmingham Barons, in 1939. With the Double-A Knoxville Smokies that season, who were affiliated with the Pittsburgh Pirates, Abernathy batted .332 with 161 hits, 32 doubles, four triples and 16 home runs in 135 games. On the defensive side, Abernathy played 129 games in the outfield and committed six errors in 273 total chances. Abernathy ended the season sixth amongst batters in the Southern Association in home runs. In December 1939, the Smokies traded Abernathy and sent cash considerations to the American Association's St. Paul Saints franchise in exchange for pitcher Sugar Cain and outfielder Bitt McCulloch. During the 1940 season, after playing for the Saints, Abernathy was acquired by the Milwaukee Brewers, also of American Association. On the season, between the two American Association teams, Abernathy batted .281 with 142 hits, 35 doubles, four triples and 10 home runs in 135 games. Abernathy finished fifth in the American Association in doubles. After staying out of baseball in 1941, Abernathy attempted to stage a comeback with the Brewers in 1942; however he never made an appearance.

== Legacy ==
Although Abernathy never played in Major League Baseball during regular season, he did play 13 seasons in the minor leagues. In 1713 career games played, Abernathy batted .315 with a .502 slugging percentage, 1997 hits, 345 doubles, 106 triples and 210 home runs in 1713 games. On the defensive side, Abernathy played 1218 games in the outfield and 244 games at first base. As an outfielder, Abernathy committed 61 errors in 2,600 total chances. He also made 2,439 putouts and 106 assists as an outfielder. Abernathy's fielding percentage in the outfield was .977. At first base, Abernathy finished his career with a .991 fielding percentage; and made 2,316 putouts, 125 assists and 23 errors. His career highs include 42 home runs (1936), 186 hits (1933), 35 doubles (1933, 1940), 16 triples (1928), .358 batting average (1928) and .590 slugging percentage (1936).

=== Accomplishments ===
- Pennant winner with the Vicksburg Hill Billies (1928)
- Pennant winner with the Montgomery Lions (exact year unknown, circa 1929–1930)
- Dixie Series champion with the Birmingham Barons (1931)
- Two-time leader of the International League in home runs (1934, 1936)

== Personal ==
Abernathy was born on October 16, 1908, in Athens, Alabama. His mother's name was T. H. Abernathy. Woody Abernathy had a son named Thomas Abernathy who is still living and resides in Austin, Texas.
