= Charlie Keller =

American baseball player (1916–1990)

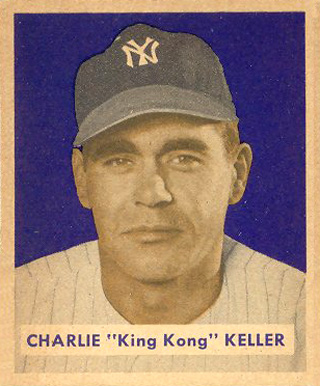
- Outfielder
- Born: September 12, 1916; Middletown, Maryland, U.S.
- Died: May 23, 1990 (aged 73); Frederick, Maryland, U.S.
- Batted: Left Threw: Right

MLB debut
- April 22, 1939, for the New York Yankees

Last MLB appearance
- September 14, 1952, for the New York Yankees

MLB statistics
- Batting average: .286
- Home runs: 189
- Runs batted in: 760
- Stats at Baseball Reference

Teams
- As player: New York Yankees (1939–1943, 1945–1949); Detroit Tigers (1950–1951); New York Yankees (1952); As coach: New York Yankees (1957–1958)

Career highlights and awards
- 5× All-Star (1940, 1941, 1943, 1946, 1947); 4× World Series champion (1939, 1941, 1943, 1958)

Charles Ernest Keller (September 12, 1916 – May 23, 1990) was an American professional baseball player. He played as a left fielder in Major League Baseball from 1939 through 1952 for the New York Yankees (1939–1943, 1945–1949, 1952) and Detroit Tigers (1950–1951). A native of Middletown, Maryland, he batted left-handed and threw right-handed. His ability to hit massive fly balls and home runs earned him the nickname "King Kong".

== Career ==
Keller was an all-round athlete at the University of Maryland, where he earned a degree in agricultural economics in 1937. Keller joined the Yankees in 1939 and quickly became the regular left fielder, with Tommy Henrich patrolling right field and Joe DiMaggio in center field. For much of ten American League seasons, Keller, DiMaggio, and Henrich formed one of the best-hitting outfields in baseball history.

Through much of his career, Keller was a feared slugger and a competent fielder. In his rookie season he hit .334 with 11 home runs and 83 RBI in 111 games. Keller hit three homers and batted .438 as the Yankees swept four games from the Cincinnati Reds in the World Series.

In his second MLB season, Keller hit .286 with 21 home runs, 93 RBI, 18 doubles and a career-high 15 triples. His most productive season came in 1941, when he hit .298 and posted career-highs in home runs (33) and RBI (122), while also hitting 10 triples and 24 doubles, making it his first 30–20–10 season. In 1942, he scored over 100 runs and walked over 100 times for the third straight season, slashing .292/.417/.513/.930, while also stealing a career-high 14 bases.

Following service with the United States Merchant Marine in 1944 and 1945, Keller returned as a regular with the Yankees for the 1946 season. He collected 30 home runs, 29 doubles, and 10 triples, the second of his two 30–20–10 seasons.

Keller played part-time from 1947 to 1949 while troubled by a ruptured disc in his back. He was released by the Yankees before the 1950 season and signed a two-year contract with the Detroit Tigers, serving mostly as a pinch-hitter. In 1952, Keller re-signed with New York in September, appearing in two games, then was released in October, marking the end of his career.

== Legacy ==
In a 13-season career, Keller was a .286 hitter with 189 home runs and 760 RBI in 1,170 games. A five-time All-Star selection, he compiled a career .410 on-base percentage and a .518 slugging average for a combined .928 OPS. He recorded a career .980 fielding percentage. In his four World Series appearances, he batted .306 with five home runs, and 18 RBI in 19 games. Keller led the American League in walks twice (1940 and 1943), batting strikeouts once (1946), and on-base plus slugging percentage once (1943).

His adjusted on-base percentage plus slugging (OPS+) of 152, the sum of his on-base percentage plus slugging average adjusted for era, stadium, and other cross-time considerations, is tied for 34th on the all-time list of players, ahead of more than a dozen Hall of Famers, although they had more plate appearances than Keller (4,604).

Following his retirement as a player, Keller founded Yankeeland Farm and had a successful career as a horse breeder – pacers and trotters – near his hometown of Middletown, Maryland. He also benefited by owning syndicated shares of several stallions, which entitled him to free stud fees. He returned to his New York Yankees uniform as a coach from mid-1957 through 1959. During his brief tenure coaching, the Yankees lost to the Hank Aaron-led Milwaukee Braves in the 1957 World Series but the next year to the World Series as the 1958 world championship team beat Milwaukee this time.

Keller was elected to the Frederick County and Maryland Sports Hall of Fame, the Kingston Professional Baseball Hall of Fame, the International League Hall of Fame and the University of Maryland Hall of Fame. A younger brother, Hal, had only a brief big-league career as a catcher but was a long-time front-office executive.

Charlie Keller died at his Frederick, Maryland, farm at the age of 73.
