= Jersey City Giants =

Minor-league baseball team in Jersey City, New Jersey (1937-1950)

- 1937–1950; Jersey City, New Jersey

Minor league affiliations
- Class: Class AAA (1946-1950); Class AA (1937-1945)
- League: International League (1937–1950)

Major league affiliations
- Team: New York Giants (1937-1950)

Minor league titles
- League titles (2): 1939; 1947

Team data
- Name: Jersey City Giants (1937–1950)
- Ballpark: Roosevelt Stadium (1937-1950)

The Jersey City Giants were an American minor league baseball franchise that played at Roosevelt Stadium in Jersey City, New Jersey, as the top farm system affiliate of the New York Giants from 1937 through 1950. The Jersey City club played in the International League (Class AA 1912–1945 and Class AAA since 1946). They were commonly referred to as the Little Giants.

== History ==
Jersey City hosted numerous minor league teams before and since the Giants, including 1½ seasons (from July 13, 1960, through the end of 1961) as the home of the relocated Havana Sugar Kings International League franchise; that club, a Cincinnati Reds affiliate, was nicknamed the Jersey City Jerseys and included many Cuban players who had taken the field in Havana.

The city's earliest IL team, which played from 1912–1933 (except for a four-year hiatus during the Federal League period and the outbreak of World War I), was called the Skeeters. But the Jersey City Giants were a notable team because they sent several star players (including Sal Maglie, Whitey Lockman, and Monte Irvin) across the river to their Major-League namesake.

In addition, the baseball color line was broken in Jersey City's Roosevelt Stadium when Jackie Robinson of the Montreal Royals made his organized baseball debut there as a visitor on April 18, 1946. Robinson made a spectacular playing debut with four hits in five at-bats, including a home run in a game that ended with a 14-1 win for the Royals.

A decade later, in 1956–1957, Roosevelt Stadium would host select Brooklyn Dodger home games as owner Walter O'Malley parried with public officials over a new stadium in Brooklyn. The Dodgers (and the New York Giants) ultimately left New York for California in 1958.

Roosevelt Stadium

== Demise ==
Although they won league titles in 1939 and 1947, the Jersey City Giants usually struggled to reach .500. And, like their neighbors, the Newark Bears, they found it impossible to compete when the three New York Major League teams began mass radio and television broadcasts of their games. Jersey City's attendance plunged from 337,000 in 1947 to 63,000 in 1950. The franchise moved to Ottawa, Ontario, in 1951 and became the Ottawa Giants, and now play as the Scranton/Wilkes-Barre Railriders.

== Notable former players of Jewish Descent ==
- Morrie Arnovich – Major League Baseball All-Star outfielder
- Harry Feldman - Major League Baseball pitcher
- Sid Gordon - 2x Major League Baseball All-Star
- Saul Rogovin - Major League Baseball pitcher; 1951 AL ERA leader
- Goody Rosen – Major League Baseball All-Star outfielder
- Phil Weintraub - Major League Baseball first baseman and outfielder

== See also ==
- Jersey City Skeeters
