= Offermann Stadium =

Former baseball and football stadium in Buffalo, New York

- Interactive map of Offermann Stadium
- Former names: Bison Stadium (1924–1934)
- Address: 1515 Michigan Ave.
- Location: Buffalo, New York, US
- Coordinates: 42.915114°N 78.862009°W
- Owner: Sportservice
- Capacity: 15,012
- Surface: Natural grass
- Record attendance: Overall: 25,000; Alf Landon rally, 8/28/1936; Sports: 23,386; Bisons vs. Red Wings, 9/22/1933
- Field size: Left field: 321 ft (98 m); Left-center field: 346 ft (105 m); Center field: 400 ft (120 m); Right-center field: 366 ft (112 m); Right field: 297 ft (91 m); Backstop: 21 ft (6.4 m)

Construction
- Groundbreaking: 1923
- Opened: April 30, 1924
- Closed: September 17, 1960
- Demolished: 1961
- Cost: US$265,000 ($4.98 million in 2025 dollars)

Tenants
- Buffalo Bisons (IL) 1924–1960; Buffalo Bisons/Rangers (NFL) 1924–1929; Indianapolis Clowns (NAL) 1951–1955

Offermann Stadium was an outdoor baseball and football stadium in Buffalo, New York, United States. Opened in 1924 as Bison Stadium, it was home to the Buffalo Bisons (IL), Buffalo Bisons/Rangers (NFL) and Indianapolis Clowns (NAL).

The stadium hosted the Little World Series (1927) and the Junior World Series (1933, 1936 and 1957). The venue also hosted summer boxing cards, most famously the 1930 bout between future International Boxing Hall of Fame members Jimmy Slattery and Maxie Rosenbloom.

The venue was demolished in 1961 and is now the site of Buffalo Academy for Visual and Performing Arts.

== History ==
=== Planning and construction ===
Bison Stadium was built on the former site of Buffalo Baseball Park for $265,000. The wooden grandstands from the prior venue, designed by famed architect Louise Blanchard Bethune, were preserved and incorporated into the new steel and concrete facility.

The ballpark was built in the middle of a residential neighborhood on a rectangular block, and was known as a hitter's park because of its small dimensions.

National Baseball Hall of Fame member Tommy Lasorda described how the small dimensions of the venue were unfavorable to pitchers like himself in a May 1997 interview:

I used to curse Offermann Stadium. I'd look over my shoulder and the left-field wall was right behind me.

Homeowners on Masten Avenue behind left field and Woodlawn Avenue behind right field erected "bootleg bleachers" on their rooftops, charging fans admission to watch games.

=== Opening and reception ===
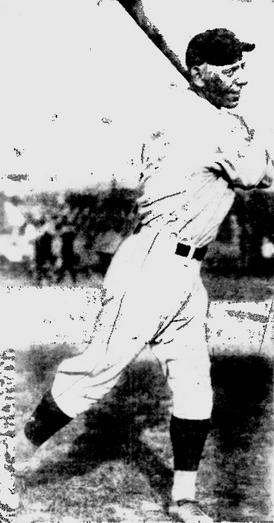
Ollie Carnegie

The first event at the venue was a baseball game between the Buffalo Bisons and Baltimore Orioles on April 30, 1924. John H. Meahl, commissioner of the Buffalo Parks Department, threw out the ceremonial first pitch.

The 1927 Bisons were recognized as one of The National Baseball Association's top 100 minor league teams of all time after amassing a 112–56 record, winning the International League championship, and appearing in the Little World Series.

The Buffalo Bisons/Rangers of the National Football League called the stadium home from 1924 to 1927, and again in 1929 before ceasing operations.

During a June 1930 boxing card at the venue, reigning NBA Light Heavyweight Champion Maxie Rosenbloom upset Jimmy Slattery to become undisputed champion, winning the NYSAC Light Heavyweight Title and vacant The Ring Light Heavyweight Title.

The first night game in International League history took place at the venue in July 1930, and saw the Montreal Royals defeat the Buffalo Bisons 5–4.

The Buffalo Bisons defeated the Rochester Red Wings in Game 6 of their best-of-seven series to win the International League championship before a record crowd of 23,386 at the venue in September 1933.

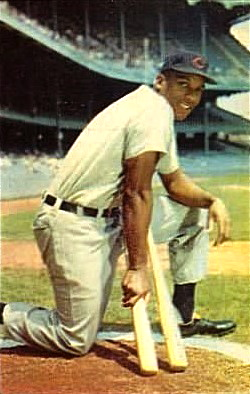
Luke Easter in Yankee Stadium

The venue was renamed to Offermann Stadium in 1935 following the death of Bisons owner Frank J. Offermann.

Alf Landon drew a record crowd of 25,000 for a political rally in August 1936 to promote his candidacy in the 1936 United States presidential election.

Ollie Carnegie of the Buffalo Bisons led the International League in home runs in 1938 and 1939, and was named league MVP for the 1938 season.

The Indianapolis Clowns of the Negro American League played at Offermann Stadium from 1951 to 1955. Hank Aaron was discovered while playing for the Clowns in 1952, and his contract was bought out by the Boston Braves for $10,000. Toni Stone signed with the Clowns in 1953 for $12,000, becoming the first woman to sign a professional baseball contract.

Luke Easter of the Bisons became the first player to hit a home run over the venue's center field scoreboard on June 14, 1957. The Bisons would win the International League championship that season, and Easter was named league MVP.

The inaugural Buffalo Jazz Festival was held at the venue over two nights in August 1960, headlined by Louis Armstrong, Duke Ellington, Dave Brubeck and Count Basie.

The venue's final event was an International League playoff game between the Buffalo Bisons and Toronto Maple Leafs on September 17, 1960. The Bisons lost Game 4 of their best-of-seven series and were eliminated from the playoffs.

=== Closing and demolition ===
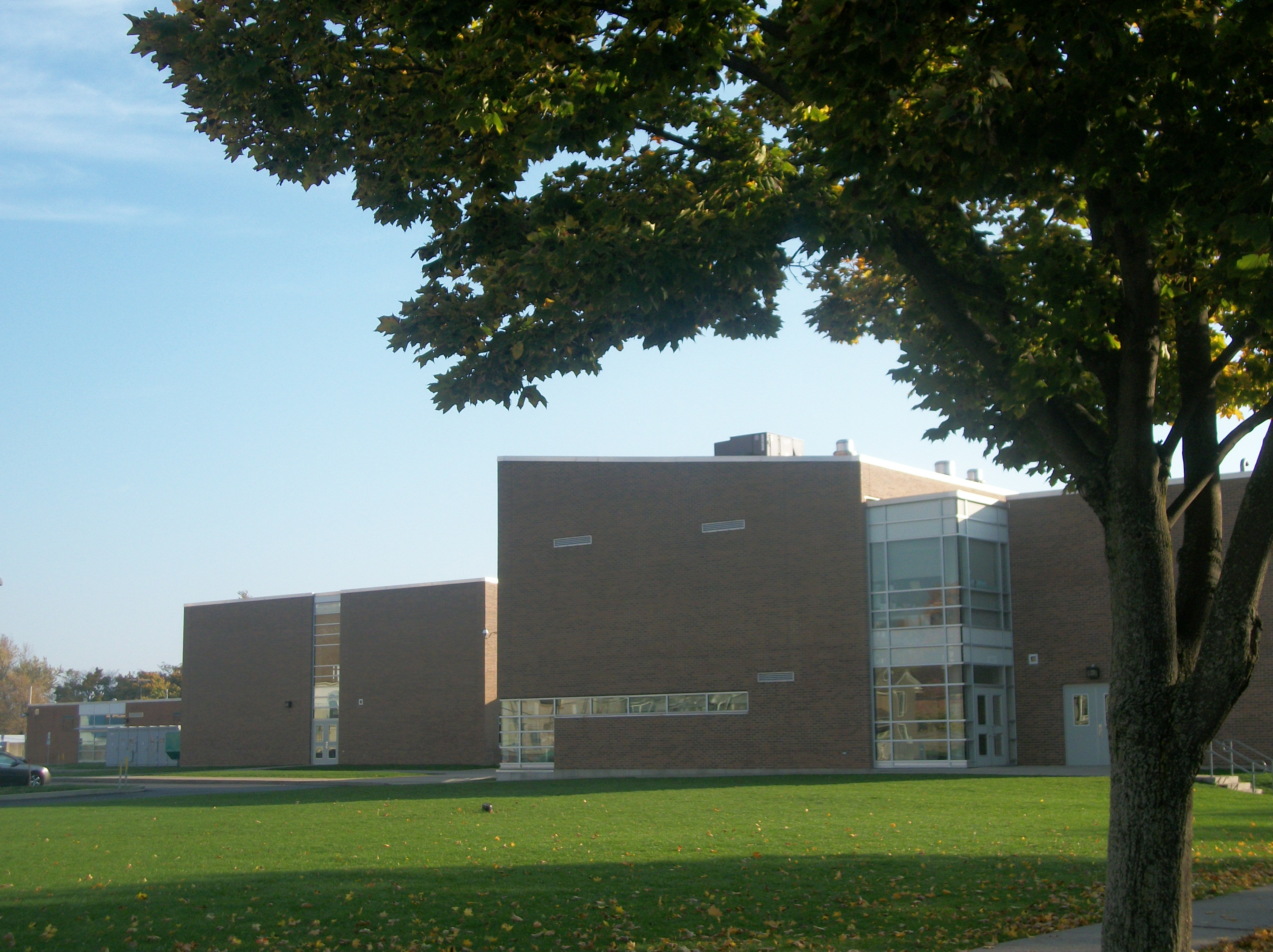
Buffalo Academy for Visual and Performing Arts

In January 1960, the City of Buffalo condemned Offermann Stadium and ordered its demolition. The stadium was demolished in 1961. Woodlawn Junior High School was built in its place, later becoming Buffalo Traditional School in 1977 and Buffalo Academy for Visual and Performing Arts in 2007.

The closure left Buffalo with only one large stadium, Civic Stadium, which at the time had been operating as an auto racetrack. A hasty renovation removed the stadium's racetrack and refit the stadium for the Bisons baseball team as well as the incoming Buffalo Bills of the American Football League; with the renovations, the venue became War Memorial Stadium and hosted the Bills until 1972 and the Bisons until 1970 (and again from 1979 until Pilot Field was finished in 1988).

In August 2012, a historical marker was placed at the school in remembrance of the site's 72-year history of hosting professional baseball by Buffalo Sports Historian John Boutet of the Greater Buffalo Sports Hall of Fame.

Events and tenants
Preceded by Buffalo Baseball Park	Home of the Buffalo Bisons; 1924 – 1960	Succeeded by War Memorial Stadium
Preceded by Buffalo Baseball Park	Home of the Buffalo Bisons/Rangers; 1924 – 1929	Succeeded by –
Preceded by Victory Field	Home of the Indianapolis Clowns; 1951 – 1955	Succeeded by Various
