= Delorimier Stadium =

Former Canadian baseball venue

Coordinates: 45°31′42″N 73°33′27″W

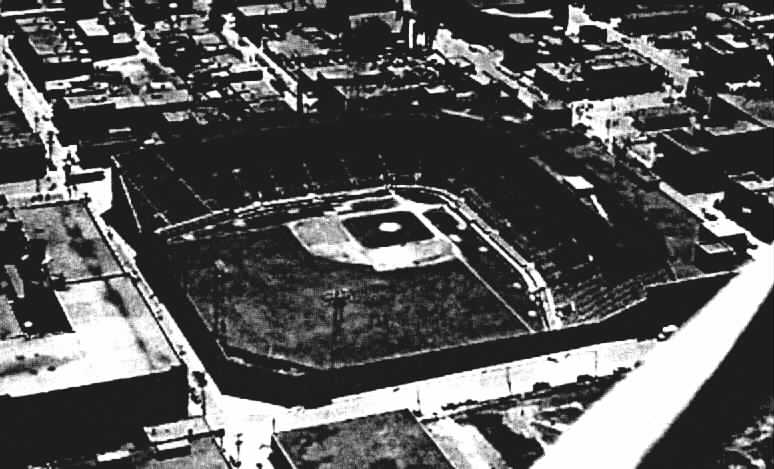
Delorimier Stadium seen here in 1950. Ontario Street East runs behind the first base side, and De Lorimier Avenue runs along the third base side.

Delorimier Stadium (French pronunciation: [dəlɔʁimje]; also known as Montreal Stadium, Hector Racine Stadium and Delorimier Downs) was a 20,000-seat sports stadium in Montreal, Quebec, Canada. It was located at 2101 Ontario Street East, at the corner of De Lorimier Avenue in the present-day Montreal borough of Ville-Marie. The stadium was home to the Montreal Royals of the International League, as the top farm club of the Brooklyn Dodgers from 1928 to 1960. The stadium was additionally home to the Montreal Alouettes of the Canadian Football League (CFL) from 1946 to 1953. The site of the former stadium is now occupied by École des Métiers des Faubourgs-de-Montréal, a trade school.

== History ==
Delorimier Downs, as it was originally called, was built by former Major League Baseball manager George Stallings, Montreal lawyer and politician Athanase David, and Montreal businessman Ernest Savard. Among the stadium's other local affluent financiers were close friends Lucien Beauregard, Romeo Gauvreau, Hector H. Racine, and Charles E. Trudeau. The stadium opened in May 1928 following a parade and a large inauguration ceremony. Royals' general manager Frank Shaughnessy had a lighting system installed in the stadium for the 1933 season.

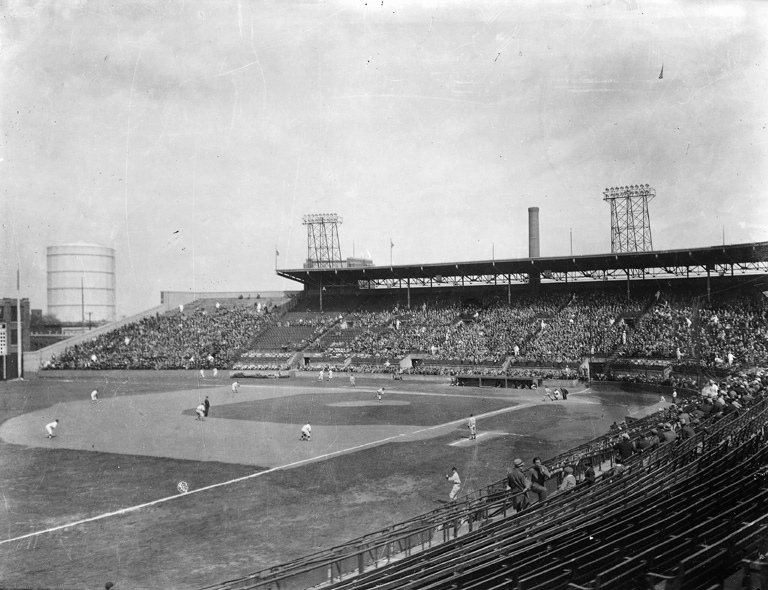
Delorimier Stadium, circa 1933.

The stadium saw the launching of the baseball career of Gene Mauch, who later came back to manage the Montreal Expos, plus future Hall of Fame members Sparky Anderson, Roberto Clemente and Jackie Robinson, the latter debuting in professional baseball with the Montreal Royals in 1946, and who went on to break baseball's color barrier with the Brooklyn Dodgers in 1947. Other Royals' players of note include player-turned-actor Chuck Connors and Hall of Fame members Duke Snider, Don Drysdale, Walter Alston, Roy Campanella and Tommy Lasorda.

The Montreal Alouettes were founded in 1946 and played there to capacity crowds until 1953 when the team moved to larger facilities. It is where Canadian Football Hall of Fame quarterback Sam Etcheverry made his CFL debut.

In 1951, several association football teams toured North America. Celtic played an exhibition match at Delorimier Stadium on May 20 against Fulham. In 1957 Celtic returned to Delorimier for a June 9 exhibition match against Tottenham Hotspur. Although six years apart, on both occasions the ticket price was 15¢.

Delorimier Stadium was also the site of a number of professional boxing and wrestling matches.

In June 1952, Dodgers owner Walter O'Malley travelled to Delorimier Stadium to dedicate a plaque to Hector Racine, who was not only the owner of the Royals, but a member of the Dodgers board. With Racine in the Delorimier Stadium president's office, the Royals won more pennants, playoffs and Little World Series than any club in International League history to date. Four years later O'Malley returned for Hector Racine Memorial Night with a high-ranking delegation of Brooklyn Dodgers, International League and Major League Baseball executives to dedicate another plaque for Racine, who had died that day in Miami after watching the Brooklyn Dodgers lose to the Boston Red Sox in an exhibition game.

== Location and dimensions ==
The ballpark's address was 2101 Ontario Street East (the east border of the park, on the first base side). Other bordering streets were Parthenais Street (north, right field); Lariviere Street (west, left field); and De Lorimier Avenue (south, third base).

The outfield was basically rectangular. There are some uncertainties about the precise dimensions of the outfield:

- The book Baseball's Fabulous Montreal Royals, by William Brown, Robert Davies Publishing, Montreal, 1996, p. 28, has the left field line as 341 feet (103.9 m), center field 441 feet (134.4 m), and right field line 293 feet (89.3 m), with a wall 12 feet (3.7 m) high surrounding the outfield.
- The book Green Cathedral, by Phil Lowrey (several editions) has left field as 340 feet (103.6 m), center field 440 feet (134.1 m), and right field 293 feet (89.3 m).
- The Baltimore Sun for May 2, 1935, p. 30, has a drawing comparing Oriole Park's dimensions with those of the Montreal ballpark. The article has it as left field 340 feet (103.6 m), center field 440 feet (134.1 m), and right field 320 feet (97.5 m).

== Legacy ==
After the Montreal Royals disbanded in 1960, the stadium saw limited use. It was briefly considered as a home for the major league Expos when that team launched in 1969. However, it could not be renovated or expanded because it was in the middle of a residential area, and was thus deemed unsuitable even for temporary use. It was eventually torn down. Prior to the demolition of the stadium, the building was torn down in bits, and the interior was used to house makeshift classrooms by the Montreal Catholic School Commission (as the student population in Quebec grew rapidly in the late 1960s). There is a small stone memorial surrounded by a red batting cage at the corner of the park at Ontario and Delorimier with a bronze plaque honouring Jackie Robinson's accomplishments.

== See also ==
- Jarry Park
