= Newark Bears (International League) =

- 1926–1949; Newark, New Jersey

Minor league affiliations
- Class: Class AAA (1946–1949); Class AA (1926–1945)
- League: International League (1926–1949)

Major league affiliations
- Team: New York Yankees (1932–1949)

Minor league titles
- Class titles (3): 1932; 1937; 1940
- League titles (5): 1932; 1937; 1938; 1940; 1945

Team data
- Name: Newark Bears (1926–1949)
- Ballpark: Ruppert Stadium (1926–1949)

The Newark Bears were an American Minor League Baseball team that played in the top-level International League from 1917 through the 1949 season, with the exception of the 1920 campaign and part of 1925. The Bears succeeded the Newark Indians, originally the Sailors, who played in the same circuit (known as the Eastern League prior to 1912) from 1902. During the Bears' lifetime, the International League was graded one step below the Major League Baseball level, Class AA through 1945 and Triple-A starting in 1946. The franchise played its home games at Ruppert Stadium in what is now known as the Ironbound section of Newark, New Jersey; the stadium was demolished in 1967. The 1932, 1937, 1938, and 1941 Bears were recognized as being among the 100 greatest minor league teams of all time.

Players in the Bears' early years who had Major League careers include Eddie Rommel, who pitched for the International League Newark Bears in 1918 and 1919. Harry Baldwin played three seasons for the Newark Bears (1921–1923) before playing for the New York Giants. Fred Brainard, who also played for the New York Giants 1914–1916, later played for the Newark Bears between 1922–1924 and was the Bears' player-manager in 1923 and 1924. Other former Major League players who managed the Newark Bears include Hall of Fame members Walter Johnson in 1928 and player-manager Tris Speaker in 1929–1930.

Newark was a hotbed of minor league baseball from the time of the formation of the Sailors, and the addition of the Newark Eagles of the Negro National Leagues in 1936. A Federal League team, the Newark Peppers, played in 1915. The Bears, however, temporarily relocated twice, in 1920 as the Akron Buckeyes and from May 16 through September 27, 1925 as the Providence Grays.

In 1931, Jacob Ruppert, owner of the New York Yankees, bought the Bears and made them the top club in the Yankees' growing farm system; they would remain one of the Bombers' top-level minor-league clubs for the rest of their existence. In 1937, the Bears featured one of the most potent lineups in baseball, including Charlie Keller, Joe Gordon, Spud Chandler and George McQuinn, among others. During this time frame, the team held their Spring Training in Sebring, Florida They won the pennant by 25½ games to become known as one of the greatest minor league teams of all time. Their legacy was ensured when, after trailing 3 games to 0, they won the last four games against the Columbus Red Birds of the American Association to capture the Junior World Series.

Following the 1949 season, the Bears moved to Springfield, Massachusetts. Their departure, and the departure of the Eagles a year before, left Newark without professional baseball for nearly 50 years, until the formation of the Atlantic League Bears (see above).

One of the Bears' players, veteran pitcher George Earl Toolson, was reassigned by the Yankees to the AA Binghamton Triplets for the 1950 season. He refused to report and sued, challenging baseball's reserve clause in Toolson v. New York Yankees, which went all the way to the U.S. Supreme Court. The justices upheld the clause and baseball's antitrust exemption, 7–2.

== Season-by-season records ==
Newark Bears – 1926–1949
Season	Affiliation	Manager	Record
1926	None	Fred Burchell	99–66, 3rd place
1927	None	John Egan	90–77, 3rd place
1928	None	Walter Johnson	81–84, 7th place
1929	None	Tris Speaker	81–85, 7th place
1930	None	Tris Speaker/Al Mamaux	80–88, 5th place
1931	None	Al Mamaux	99–69, 2nd place
1932	Yankees	Al Mamaux	109–59, 1st place
1933	Yankees	Al Mamaux	102–62, 1st place South
1934	Yankees	Bob Shawkey	93–60, 1st place
1935	Yankees	Bob Shawkey	81–71, 4th place
1936	Yankees	Ossie Vitt	88–67, 3rd place
1937	Yankees	Ossie Vitt	109–43, 1st place
1938	Yankees	Johnny Neun	104–48, 1st place
1939	Yankees	Johnny Neun	82–73, 4th place
1940	Yankees	Johnny Neun	95–65, 2nd place
1941	Yankees	Johnny Neun	100–54, 1st place
1942	Yankees	Billy Meyer	92–61, 1st place
1943	Yankees	Billy Meyer	85–68, 2nd place
1944	Yankees	Billy Meyer	85–69, 2nd place
1945	Yankees	Billy Meyer	89–64, 2nd place
1946	Yankees	George Selkirk	80–74, 4th place
1947	Yankees	George Selkirk	65–89, 6th place
1948	Yankees	Bill Skiff	80–72, 2nd place
1949	Yankees	Buddy Hassett	55–98, 8th place

Totals	Overall record	Winning percentage
(1926–1949)	2,039–1,586	.562

=== Post-season results ===
- 1932: Defeated Minneapolis Millers (American Association), 4 games to 2, in Junior World Series
- 1933: Lost to Rochester Red Wings, 3 games to 1, in opening round
- 1934: Lost to Toronto Maple Leafs, 4 games to 3, in opening round
- 1935: Lost to Syracuse Chiefs, 4 games to 0, in opening round
- 1936: Lost to Buffalo Bisons, 4 games to 1, in opening round
- 1937: Defeated Syracuse Chiefs, 4 games to 0; defeated Baltimore Orioles, 4 games to 0, for league championship; defeated Columbus Red Birds, 4 games to 3, in Junior World Series
- 1938: Defeated Rochester Red Wings, 4 games to 3; defeated Buffalo Bisons, 4 games to 1, for league championship; lost to Kansas City Blues, 4 games to 3, in Junior World Series
- 1939: Defeated Jersey City Giants, 4 games to 2; lost to Rochester Red Wings, 4 games to 3, in championship round
- 1940: Defeated Jersey City Giants, 4 games to 0; defeated Baltimore Orioles, 4 games to 3, for league championship; defeated Louisville Colonels, 4 games to 2, in Junior World Series
- 1941: Defeated Rochester Red Wings, 4 games to 1; lost to Montreal Royals, 4 games to 3, in championship round
- 1942: Lost to Jersey City Giants, 4 games to 2, in opening round
- 1943: Lost to Syracuse Chiefs, 4 games to 2, in opening round
- 1944: Defeated Toronto Maple Leafs, 4 games to 0; lost to Baltimore Orioles, 4 games to 3, in championship round
- 1945: Defeated Toronto Maple Leafs, 4 games to 2; defeated Montreal Royals, 4 games to 3, for league championship; lost to Louisville Colonels, 4 games to 2, in Junior World Series
- 1946: Lost to Montréal Royals, 4 games to 2, in opening round
- 1948: Lost to Syracuse Chiefs, 4 games to 3, in opening round

=== Titles ===
The Bears won the Governors' Cup, the championship of the IL, 4 times, and played in the championship series 7 times.

- 1937 – Defeated Baltimore
- 1938 – Defeated Buffalo
- 1939 – Lost to Rochester
- 1940 – Defeated Baltimore
- 1941 – Lost to Montreal
- 1944 – Lost to Baltimore
- 1945 – Defeated Montreal

=== Other historical Newark teams ===
Other teams hailing from Newark include:

- Newark Domestics, played in the Eastern League from 1884 to 1885.
- Newark Little Giants, played in the Eastern League in 1886, and the International League in 1887.
- Newark, played in the Central League in 1888, and the Atlantic Association from 1889 to 1890.
- Newark Colts, played in the Atlantic League from 1896 to 1900.
- Newark, played in the 1908 Pennsylvania-New Jersey League
- Newark Indians, played in the Eastern League from 1902 to 1911, and the International League from 1912 to the middle of the 1915 season. They were the International League champions in 1913.
- Newark Stars, played in the Eastern Colored League in 1926.
- Newark Browns, played in the East-West League in 1932.
- Newark Dodgers, played in the Negro National League from 1934 to 1935.
- Newark Peppers, played in the Federal League in 1915.
- Newark Bears, played in the New York–Penn League in 1950 to 1952.
