= Ruppert Stadium (New Jersey) =

Baseball stadium in Newark, New Jersey, US

Coordinates: 40.7199°N 74.1466°W

- Interactive map of Ruppert Stadium
- Former names: Davids' Stadium (1926–1931); Bear Stadium (1932–1933)
- Location: 258 Wilson Avenue, Newark, New Jersey
- Owner: New York Yankees (1931–1952); City of Newark (1952–1967)
- Capacity: 12,000 (1926); 19,000 (1936)
- Surface: Grass
- Field size: (1923) Left Field – 305 ft Left Center – 365 ft Center Field – 410 ft Right Center – 365 ft Right Field – 305 ft

Construction
- Groundbreaking: 1926
- Opened: 1926
- Demolished: 1967
- Cost: US$125,000

Tenants
- Newark Bears (AFL-1926); Newark Bears (IL) (1926–1949); Newark Stars (ECL) (1926); Newark Eagles (NNL) (1936–1948)

Ruppert Stadium was a baseball stadium in Newark, New Jersey, in the area now known as the Ironbound.

The ballpark was built adjacent to the site of an earlier Newark facility known as Wiedenmayer's Park, which served as the home field of the Newark Indians from 1902 through 1916. It was also used for other events until being destroyed by fire in 1925.

A new ballpark was built, originally named Davids' Stadium after Charles L. Davids, owner of the Newark Bears, it was home to the minor league Newark Bears of the International League from 1926 to 1949, and to the Negro leagues Newark Stars in 1926 and Newark Eagles from 1936 to 1948. It was also the home field of the short-lived Newark Bears of the first American Football League in 1926.

In January 1932, the stadium was renamed for Jacob Ruppert, a baseball team owner who built the farm system of the New York Yankees.

In October 1952, the Yankees organization announced their intention to tear down the 14,000-seat stadium and sell the land for real estate development. The local Board of Education stepped in to purchase the stadium for $275,000 and converted the property into a school recreation center. In 1967 the stadium was demolished and the land was sold again the following year to the Vita Food Products company, which built a food plant on the site.

== See also ==
- History of sports in Newark, New Jersey
- Hinchliffe Stadium
