= 1964 International League season =

- League: International League
- Sport: Baseball
- Duration: April 22 – September 26
- Games: 154
- Teams: 8

Regular season
- Season MVP: Joe Morgan, Jacksonville Suns

Governors' Cup Playoffs
- League champions: Rochester Red Wings
- Runners-up: Syracuse Chiefs

IL seasons
- ← 1963 1965 →

The 1964 International League was a Class AAA baseball season played between April 22 and September 26. Eight teams played a 154-game schedule, with the top four teams qualifying for the post-season.

The Rochester Red Wings won the Governors' Cup, defeating the Syracuse Chiefs in the final round of the playoffs.

== Team changes ==
- The Arkansas Travelers left the league and joined the Pacific Coast League.
- The Indianapolis Indians left the league and joined the Pacific Coast League.
- With eight teams in the league, the league to a single-division, eight-team format.
- The Atlanta Crackers ended their affiliation with the St. Louis Cardinals and began a new affiliation with the Minnesota Twins.
- The Jacksonville Suns ended their affiliation with the Cleveland Indians and began a new affiliation with the St. Louis Cardinals.
- The Toronto Maple Leafs began a new affiliation with the Milwaukee Braves as well as continuing to be an affiliate of the Washington Senators.

== Teams ==
1964 International League
Team	City	MLB Affiliate	Stadium
Atlanta Crackers	Atlanta, Georgia	Minnesota Twins	Ponce de Leon Park
Buffalo Bisons	Buffalo, New York	New York Mets	War Memorial Stadium
Columbus Jets	Columbus, Ohio	Pittsburgh Pirates	Jets Stadium
Jacksonville Suns	Jacksonville, Florida	St. Louis Cardinals	Jacksonville Baseball Park
Richmond Virginians	Richmond, Virginia	New York Yankees	Parker Field
Rochester Red Wings	Rochester, New York	Baltimore Orioles	Red Wing Stadium
Syracuse Chiefs	Syracuse, New York	Detroit Tigers	MacArthur Stadium
Toronto Maple Leafs	Toronto, Ontario	Milwaukee Braves; Washington Senators	Maple Leaf Stadium

== Map of teams ==
International League teams

== Regular season ==
=== Summary ===
- The Jacksonville Suns finished with the best record in the league for the second time in the past three seasons.

=== Standings ===
International League
Team	Win	Loss	%	GB
Jacksonville Suns	89	62	.589	–
Syracuse Chiefs	88	66	.571	2.5
Buffalo Bisons	80	69	.537	8
Rochester Red Wings	82	72	.532	8.5
Toronto Maple Leafs	80	72	.526	9.5
Columbus Jets	68	85	.444	22
Richmond Virginians	65	88	.425	25
Atlanta Crackers	55	93	.372	32.5

== League Leaders ==
=== Batting leaders ===
Stat	Player	Total
AVG	Sandy Valdespino, Atlanta Crackers	.337
H	Sandy Valdespino, Atlanta Crackers	179
R	Mack Jones, Syracuse Chiefs	109
2B	Jack Damaska, Jacksonville Suns	30
3B	Mack Jones, Syracuse Chiefs	18
HR	Mack Jones, Syracuse Chiefs	39
RBI	Mack Jones, Syracuse Chiefs	102
SB	Ted Savage, Columbus Jets	26

=== Pitching leaders ===
Stat	Player	Total
W	Bruce Brubaker, Syracuse Chiefs	15
L	Jim Merritt, Atlanta Crackers; Chuck Nieson, Atlanta Crackers	17
ERA	Mel Stottlemyre, Richmond Virginians	1.42
CG	Jim Merritt, Atlanta Crackers	12
SHO	Mel Stottlemyre, Richmond Virginians	6
SO	Jim Merritt, Atlanta Crackers	174
IP	Jim Merritt, Atlanta Crackers	200.0

== Playoffs ==
- The Rochester Red Wings won their fifth Governors' Cup, defeating the Syracuse Chiefs in six games.

=== Playoff bracket ===
Semi-finals
1	Jacksonville	0
4	Rochester	4
2	Syracuse	4
3	Buffalo	3

Governors' Cup
4	Rochester	4
2	Syracuse	2

== Awards ==
Player awards
Award name	Recipient
Most Valuable Player	Joe Morgan, Jacksonville Suns
Pitcher of the Year	Mel Stottlemyre, Richmond Virginians
Rookie of the Year	Jim Northrup, Syracuse Chiefs

== See also ==
- 1964 Major League Baseball season
