= 1965 International League season =

- League: International League
- Sport: Baseball
- Duration: April 17 – September 14
- Games: 148
- Teams: 8

Regular season
- Season MVP: Joe Foy, Toronto Maple Leafs

Governors' Cup Playoffs
- League champions: Toronto Maple Leafs
- Runners-up: Columbus Jets

IL seasons
- ← 1964 1966 →

The 1965 International League was a Class AAA baseball season played between April 17 and September 14. Eight teams played a 148-game schedule, with the top four teams qualifying for the post-season.

The Toronto Maple Leafs won the Governors' Cup, defeating the Columbus Jets in the final round of the playoffs.

== Team changes ==
- The Richmond Virginians relocated to Toledo, Ohio and were renamed the Toledo Mud Hens. The club would remain affiliated with the New York Yankees.
- The Atlanta Crackers ended their affiliation with the Minnesota Twins and began a new affiliation with the Milwaukee Braves.
- The Toronto Maple Leafs ended their affiliations with the Milwaukee Braves and Washington Senators and began an affiliation with the Boston Red Sox.

== Teams ==
1965 International League
Team	City	MLB Affiliate	Stadium
Atlanta Crackers	Atlanta, Georgia	Milwaukee Braves	Atlanta Stadium
Buffalo Bisons	Buffalo, New York	New York Mets	War Memorial Stadium
Columbus Jets	Columbus, Ohio	Pittsburgh Pirates	Jets Stadium
Jacksonville Suns	Jacksonville, Florida	St. Louis Cardinals	Wolfson Park
Rochester Red Wings	Rochester, New York	Baltimore Orioles	Red Wing Stadium
Syracuse Chiefs	Syracuse, New York	Detroit Tigers	MacArthur Stadium
Toledo Mud Hens	Toledo, Ohio	New York Yankees	Lucas County Stadium
Toronto Maple Leafs	Toronto, Ontario	Boston Red Sox	Maple Leaf Stadium

== Map of teams ==
International League teams

== Regular season ==
=== Summary ===
- The Columbus Jets finished with the best record in the league for the first time since 1961.
- The regular season schedule was shortened from 154-games to 148-games.

=== Standings ===
International League
Team	Win	Loss	%	GB
Columbus Jets	85	61	.582	–
Atlanta Crackers	83	64	.565	2.5
Toronto Maple Leafs	81	64	.559	3.5
Syracuse Chiefs	74	73	.503	11.5
Rochester Red Wings	73	74	.497	12.5
Jacksonville Suns	71	76	.483	14.5
Toledo Mud Hens	68	78	.466	17
Buffalo Bisons	51	96	.347	34.5

== League Leaders ==
=== Batting leaders ===
Stat	Player	Total
AVG	Joe Foy, Toronto Maple Leafs	.302
H	Steve Demeter, Syracuse Chiefs	165
R	Bob Saverine, Rochester Red Wings	91
2B	Steve Demeter, Syracuse Chiefs	28
3B	John Ryan, Syracuse Chiefs; Bobby Tolan, Jacksonville Suns	10
HR	Pancho Herrera, Columbus Jets	21
RBI	Steve Demeter, Syracuse Chiefs	90
SB	George Spriggs, Columbus Jets	66

=== Pitching leaders ===
Stat	Player	Total
W	Dick LeMay, Jacksonville Suns	17
L	Chuck Estrada, Rochester Red Wings	14
ERA	Dooley Womack, Toledo Mud Hens	2.17
CG	Frank Bertaina, Rochester Red Wings; Jack Curtis, Toledo Mud Hens	12
SHO	Jack Curtis, Toledo Mud Hens	5
SO	Frank Bertaina, Rochester Red Wings	188
IP	Dick LeMay, Jacksonville Suns	209.0

== Playoffs ==
- The Toronto Maple Leafs won their third Governors' Cup, defeating the Columbus Jets in five games.

=== Playoff bracket ===
Semi-finals
1	Columbus	4
4	Syracuse	2
2	Atlanta	0
3	Toronto	4

Governors' Cup
1	Columbus	1
3	Toronto	4

== Awards ==
Player awards
Award name	Recipient
Most Valuable Player	Joe Foy, Toronto Maple Leafs
Pitcher of the Year	Sam Jones, Columbus Jets
Rookie of the Year	Joe Foy, Toronto Maple Leafs

== See also ==
- 1965 Major League Baseball season
