= 1962 International League season =

- League: International League
- Sport: Baseball
- Duration: April 25 – September 25
- Games: 154
- Teams: 8

Regular season
- Season MVP: Tony Martínez, Jacksonville Suns

Governors' Cup Playoffs
- League champions: Atlanta Crackers
- Runners-up: Jacksonville Suns

IL seasons
- ← 1961 1963 →

The 1962 International League was a Class AAA baseball season played between April 25 and September 25. Eight teams played a 154-game schedule, with the top four teams qualifying for the post-season.

The Atlanta Crackers won the Governors' Cup, defeating the Jacksonville Suns in the final round of the playoffs.

== Team changes ==
- The Charleston Marlins relocated to Atlanta, Georgia and were renamed the Atlanta Crackers. The club remained affiliated with the St. Louis Cardinals.
- The Jersey City Jerseys relocated to Jacksonville, Florida and were renamed the Jacksonville Suns. The club also ended their affiliation with the Cincinnati Reds and began a new affiliation with the Cleveland Indians.
- The Syracuse Chiefs ended their affiliation with the Minnesota Twins and began an affiliation with the New York Mets and Washington Senators.
- The Toronto Maple Leafs began an affiliation with the Milwaukee Braves.

== Teams ==
1962 International League
Team	City	MLB Affiliate	Stadium
Atlanta Crackers	Atlanta, Georgia	St. Louis Cardinals	Ponce de Leon Park
Buffalo Bisons	Buffalo, New York	Philadelphia Phillies	War Memorial Stadium
Columbus Jets	Columbus, Ohio	Pittsburgh Pirates	Jets Stadium
Jacksonville Suns	Jacksonville, Florida	Cleveland Indians	Jacksonville Baseball Park
Richmond Virginians	Richmond, Virginia	New York Yankees	Parker Field
Rochester Red Wings	Rochester, New York	Baltimore Orioles	Red Wing Stadium
Syracuse Chiefs	Syracuse, New York	New York Mets; Washington Senators	MacArthur Stadium
Toronto Maple Leafs	Toronto, Ontario	Milwaukee Braves	Maple Leaf Stadium

== Map of teams ==
International League teams

== Regular season ==
=== Summary ===
- The Jacksonville Suns finished with the best record in the league in their first season after relocating from Jersey City, New Jersey.

=== Standings ===
International League
Team	Win	Loss	%	GB
Jacksonville Suns	94	60	.610	–
Toronto Maple Leafs	91	62	.595	2.5
Atlanta Crackers	83	71	.539	11
Rochester Red Wings	82	72	.532	12
Columbus Jets	80	74	.519	14
Buffalo Bisons	73	80	.477	20.5
Richmond Virginians	59	95	.383	35
Syracuse Chiefs	53	101	.344	41

== League Leaders ==
=== Batting leaders ===
Stat	Player	Total
AVG	Vic Davalillo, Jacksonville Suns	.346
H	Vic Davalillo, Jacksonville Suns	200
R	Pete Ward, Rochester Red Wings	114
2B	Pete Ward, Rochester Red Wings	34
3B	Vic Davalillo, Jacksonville Suns	18
HR	Pancho Herrera, Buffalo Bisons	32
RBI	Bob Bailey, Columbus Jets; Pancho Herrera, Buffalo Bisons	108
SB	Vic Davalillo, Jacksonville Suns	24

=== Pitching leaders ===
Stat	Player	Total
W	Joe Schaffernoth, Jacksonville Suns	18
L	Hal Stowe, Richmond Virginians	15
ERA	Jim Constable, Toronto Maple Leafs	2.56
CG	Joe Schaffernoth, Jacksonville Suns	12
SHO	Orlando Peña, Toronto Maple Leafs	5
SO	Harry Fanok, Atlanta Crackers	192
IP	Joe Schaffernoth, Jacksonville Suns	219.0

== Playoffs ==
- The Atlanta Crackers won their first Governors' Cup in their inaugural season, defeating the Jacksonville Suns in seven games.

=== Playoff bracket ===
Semi-finals
1	Jacksonville	4
4	Rochester	3
2	Toronto	2
3	Atlanta	4

Governors' Cup
1	Jacksonville	3
3	Atlanta	4

== Awards ==
Player awards
Award name	Recipient
Most Valuable Player	Tony Martínez, Jacksonville Suns
Pitcher of the Year	Joe Schaffernoth, Jacksonville Suns
Rookie of the Year	Bob Bailey, Columbus Jets

== See also ==
- 1962 Major League Baseball season
