= 1961 International League season =

- League: International League
- Sport: Baseball
- Duration: April 17 – September 22
- Games: 154
- Teams: 8

Regular season
- Season MVP: Ted Savage, Buffalo Bisons

Governors' Cup Playoffs
- League champions: Buffalo Bisons
- Runners-up: Rochester Red Wings

IL seasons
- ← 1960 1962 →

The 1961 International League was a Class AAA baseball season played between April 17 and September 22. Eight teams played a 154-game schedule, with the top four teams qualifying for the post-season.

The Buffalo Bisons won the Governors' Cup, defeating the Rochester Red Wings in the final round of the playoffs.

== Team changes ==
- The Rochester Red Wings ended their affiliation with the St. Louis Cardinals and began an affiliation with the Baltimore Orioles.
- The Montreal Royals relocated to Syracuse, New York and were renamed the Syracuse Chiefs. The club also ended their affiliation with the Los Angeles Dodgers and began an affiliation with the Minnesota Twins.
- The Miami Marlins relocated to San Juan, Puerto Rico and were renamed the San Juan Marlins. The club also ended their affiliation with the Baltimore Orioles and began an affiliation with the St. Louis Cardinals. The Marlins would eventually relocate once again during the season to Charleston, West Virginia and be renamed the Charleston Marlins.
- The Toronto Maple Leafs ended their affiliation with the Cleveland Indians.

== Teams ==
1961 International League
Team	City	MLB Affiliate	Stadium
Buffalo Bisons	Buffalo, New York	Philadelphia Phillies	War Memorial Stadium
Columbus Jets	Columbus, Ohio	Pittsburgh Pirates	Jets Stadium
Jersey City Jerseys	Jersey City, New Jersey	Cincinnati Reds	Roosevelt Stadium
Richmond Virginians	Richmond, Virginia	New York Yankees	Parker Field
Rochester Red Wings	Rochester, New York	Baltimore Orioles	Red Wing Stadium
San Juan Marlins; Charleston Marlins	San Juan, Puerto Rico; Charleston, West Virginia	St. Louis Cardinals	Sixto Escobar Stadium; Watt Powell Park
Syracuse Chiefs	Syracuse, New York	Minnesota Twins	MacArthur Stadium
Toronto Maple Leafs	Toronto, Ontario	None	Maple Leaf Stadium

== Map of teams ==
International League teams

== Regular season ==
=== Summary ===
- The Columbus Jets finished with the best record in the league for the first time in franchise history.
- On May 19, The San Juan Marlins relocated to Charleston, West Virginia and became the Charleston Marlins.
- On September 11, the Rochester Red Wings and Toronto Maple Leafs held a one-game playoff for the final playoff position. The Red Wings defeated the Maple Leafs 12-11 in ten innings to clinch the final post-season berth.

=== Standings ===
International League
Team	Win	Loss	%	GB
Columbus Jets	92	62	.597	–
San Juan Marlins/Charleston Marlins	88	66	.571	4
Buffalo Bisons	85	67	.559	6
Rochester Red Wings	77	78	.497	15.5
Toronto Maple Leafs	76	79	.490	16.5
Richmond Virginians	71	83	.461	21
Jersey City Jerseys	70	82	.461	21
Syracuse Chiefs	56	98	.364	36

== League Leaders ==
=== Batting leaders ===
Stat	Player	Total
AVG	Ted Savage, Buffalo Bisons	.325
H	Ted Savage, Buffalo Bisons	178
R	Ted Savage, Buffalo Bisons	111
2B	Jim Pendleton, Jersey City Jerseys	33
3B	Lou Jackson, Toronto Maple Leafs	18
HR	Boog Powell, Rochester Red Wings	32
RBI	Félix Torres, Buffalo Bisons	97
SB	Ted Savage, Buffalo Bisons	31

=== Pitching leaders ===
Stat	Player	Total
W	Ray Washburn, San Juan / Charleston	16
L	Fred Kipp, Richmond Virginians	16
ERA	Ray Washburn, San Juan / Charleston	2.34
CG	Al Jackson, Columbus Jets; Dave Stenhouse, Jersey City Jerseys; Ray Washburn, San Juan / Charleston	12
SHO	Herb Moford, Rochester Red Wings	5
SO	Bob Veale, Columbus Jets	208
IP	Herb Moford, Rochester Red Wings	219.0

== Playoffs ==
- The Buffalo Bisons won their fourth Governors' Cup, defeating the Rochester Red Wings in five games.

=== Playoff bracket ===
Semi-finals
1	Columbus	1
4	Rochester	4
2	Charleston	0
3	Buffalo	4

Governors' Cup
4	Rochester	1
3	Buffalo	4

== Awards ==
Player awards
Award name	Recipient
Most Valuable Player	Ted Savage, Buffalo Bisons
Pitcher of the Year	Diomedes Olivo, Columbus Jets
Rookie of the Year	Tom Tresh, Richmond Virginians

== See also ==
- 1961 Major League Baseball season
