= 1970 International League season =

- League: International League
- Sport: Baseball
- Duration: April 17 – September 12
- Games: 140
- Teams: 8

Regular season
- Season MVP: Roger Freed, Rochester Red Wings; George Kopacz, Columbus Jets

Governors' Cup Playoffs
- League champions: Syracuse Chiefs
- Runners-up: Columbus Jets

IL seasons
- ← 1969 1971 →

The 1970 International League was a Class AAA baseball season played between April 17 and September 12. Eight teams played a 140-game schedule, with the top four teams qualifying for the post-season.

The Syracuse Chiefs won the Governors' Cup, defeating the Columbus Jets in the final round of the playoffs.

== Team changes ==
- The Buffalo Bisons ended their affiliation with the Washington Senators and began an affiliation with the Montreal Expos.
- During the season, the Buffalo Bisons relocated to Winnipeg, Manitoba and were renamed the Winnipeg Whips.

== Teams ==
1970 International League
Team	City	MLB Affiliate	Stadium
Buffalo Bisons; Winnipeg Whips	Buffalo, New York; Winnipeg, Manitoba	Montreal Expos	War Memorial Stadium; Winnipeg Stadium
Columbus Jets	Columbus, Ohio	Pittsburgh Pirates	Jets Stadium
Louisville Colonels	Louisville, Kentucky	Boston Red Sox	Fairgrounds Stadium
Richmond Braves	Richmond, Virginia	Atlanta Braves	Parker Field
Rochester Red Wings	Rochester, New York	Baltimore Orioles	Silver Stadium
Syracuse Chiefs	Syracuse, New York	New York Yankees	MacArthur Stadium
Tidewater Tides	Norfolk, Virginia	New York Mets	Met Park
Toledo Mud Hens	Toledo, Ohio	Detroit Tigers	Lucas County Stadium

== Map of teams ==
International League teams

== Regular season ==
=== Summary ===
- The Syracuse Chiefs finished with the best record in the league for the first time in franchise history.
- On June 4, the Buffalo Bisons relocated to Winnipeg, Manitoba and were renamed the Winnipeg Whips.

=== Standings ===
International League
Team	Win	Loss	%	GB
Syracuse Chiefs	84	56	.600	–
Columbus Jets	81	59	.579	3
Rochester Red Wings	76	64	.543	8
Tidewater Tides	74	66	.529	10
Richmond Braves	73	67	.521	11
Louisville Colonels	69	71	.493	15
Buffalo Bisons/Winnipeg Whips	52	88	.371	32
Toledo Mud Hens	51	89	.364	33

== League Leaders ==
=== Batting leaders ===
Stat	Player	Total
AVG	Ralph Garr, Richmond Braves	.386
H	Roger Freed, Rochester Red Wings	168
R	Don Baylor, Rochester Red Wings	127
2B	Don Baylor, Rochester Red Wings	34
3B	Don Baylor, Rochester Red Wings	15
HR	Hal Breeden, Richmond Braves	37
RBI	Roger Freed, Rochester Red Wings	130
SB	Ralph Garr, Richmond Braves	39

=== Pitching leaders ===
Stat	Player	Total
W	Rob Gardner, Syracuse Chiefs	16
ERA	Rob Gardner, Syracuse Chiefs	2.93
CG	Ernie McAnally, Buffalo / Winnipeg	14
SHO	Rob Gardner, Syracuse Chiefs	4
SO	Ernie McAnally, Buffalo / Winnipeg	178
IP	Rob Gardner, Syracuse Chiefs; Ernie McAnally, Buffalo / Winnipeg	192.0

== Playoffs ==
- The Governors' Cup finals was reduced from a best-of-seven series to a best-of-five series.
- The Syracuse Chiefs won their second consecutive Governors' Cup, and seventh overall, defeating the Columbus Jets in four games.
- This was the fourth consecutive season that the Columbus Jets lost in the final round.

=== Playoff bracket ===
Semi-finals
1	Syracuse	3
4	Tidewater	0
2	Columbus	3
3	Rochester	2

Governors' Cup
1	Syracuse	3
2	Columbus	1

== Awards ==
International League awards
Award name	Recipient
Most Valuable Player	Roger Freed, Rochester Red Wings; George Kopacz, Columbus Jets
Pitcher of the Year	Rob Gardner, Syracuse Chiefs
Rookie of the Year	Roger Freed, Rochester Red Wings
Manager of the Year	Frank Verdi, Syracuse Chiefs

== All-star team ==
International League all-star team
Position	All-star
Catcher	Milt May, Columbus Jets; Bob Montgomery, Louisville Colonels
First base	George Kopacz, Columbus Jets
Second base	Len Boehmer, Syracuse Chiefs
Shortstop	Frank Baker, Syracuse Chiefs
Third base	Mike Ferraro, Rochester Red Wings
Outfield	Don Baylor, Rochester Red Wings; Roger Freed, Rochester Red Wings; Ralph Garr, Richmond Braves
Pitcher	Rob Gardner, Syracuse Chiefs; Ernie McAnally, Buffalo / Winnipeg; Hal Reniff, Syracuse Chiefs
Manager	Frank Verdi, Syracuse Chiefs

== See also ==
- 1970 Major League Baseball season
