= 1968 International League season =

- League: International League
- Sport: Baseball
- Duration: April 20 – September 18
- Games: 148
- Teams: 8

Regular season
- Season MVP: Merv Rettenmund, Rochester Red Wings

Governors' Cup Playoffs
- League champions: Jacksonville Suns
- Runners-up: Columbus Jets

IL seasons
- ← 1967 1969 →

The 1968 International League was a Class AAA baseball season played between April 20 and September 18. Eight teams played a 148-game schedule, with the top four teams qualifying for the post-season.

The Jacksonville Suns won the Governors' Cup, defeating the Columbus Jets in the final round of the playoffs.

== Team changes ==
- The Toronto Maple Leafs relocated to Louisville, Kentucky and were renamed the Louisville Colonels. The club remained affiliated with the Boston Red Sox.
- The Buffalo Bisons ended their affiliation with the Cincinnati Reds and began an affiliation with the Washington Senators.
- The Toledo Mud Hens ended their affiliations with the New York Yankees and began an affiliation with the Detroit Tigers.

== Teams ==
1968 International League
| Team | City | MLB Affiliate | Stadium |
| Buffalo Bisons | Buffalo, New York | Washington Senators | War Memorial Stadium |
| Columbus Jets | Columbus, Ohio | Pittsburgh Pirates | Jets Stadium |
| Jacksonville Suns | Jacksonville, Florida | New York Mets | Wolfson Park |
| Louisville Colonels | Louisville, Kentucky | Boston Red Sox | Fairgrounds Stadium |
| Richmond Braves | Richmond, Virginia | Atlanta Braves | Parker Field |
| Rochester Red Wings | Rochester, New York | Baltimore Orioles | Red Wing Stadium |
| Syracuse Chiefs | Syracuse, New York | New York Yankees | MacArthur Stadium |
| Toledo Mud Hens | Toledo, Ohio | Detroit Tigers | Lucas County Stadium |

== Map of teams ==
International League teams

== Regular season ==
=== Summary ===
- The Toledo Mud Hens finished with the best record in the league for the first time in franchise history.

=== Standings ===
International League
| Team | Win | Loss | % | GB |
|---|---|---|---|---|
| Toledo Mud Hens | 83 | 64 | .565 | – |
| Columbus Jets | 82 | 64 | .562 | 0.5 |
| Rochester Red Wings | 77 | 69 | .527 | 5.5 |
| Jacksonville Suns | 75 | 71 | .514 | 7.5 |
| Louisville Colonels | 72 | 75 | .490 | 11 |
| Syracuse Chiefs | 72 | 75 | .490 | 11 |
| Buffalo Bisons | 66 | 81 | .449 | 17 |
| Richmond Braves | 59 | 87 | .404 | 23.5 |

== League Leaders ==
=== Batting leaders ===
| Stat | Player | Total |
|---|---|---|
| AVG | Merv Rettenmund, Rochester Red Wings | .331 |
| H | Elvio Jiménez, Columbus Jets; Bobby Pfeil, Jacksonville Suns | 157 |
| R | Merv Rettenmund, Rochester Red Wings | 104 |
| 2B | George Thomas, Louisville Colonels | 33 |
| 3B | Bobby Mitchell, Louisville Colonels | 15 |
| HR | Dave Nicholson, Richmond Braves | 34 |
| RBI | Dave Nicholson, Richmond Braves | 86 |
| SB | George Spriggs, Columbus Jets | 46 |

=== Pitching leaders ===
| Stat | Player | Total |
|---|---|---|
| W | Dave Roberts, Columbus Jets | 18 |
| L | Jack Jenkins, Buffalo Bisons | 14 |
| ERA | Galen Cisco, Louisville Colonels | 2.21 |
| CG | Mike Marshall, Toledo Mud Hens | 16 |
| SHO | Galen Cisco, Louisville Colonels | 6 |
| SO | Jim Rooker, Toledo Mud Hens | 206 |
| IP | Mike Marshall, Toledo Mud Hens | 211.0 |

== Playoffs ==
- The Jacksonville Suns won their first Governors' Cup, defeating the Columbus Jets in four games.

=== Playoff bracket ===
Semi-finals
1 | Toledo | 1
4 | Jacksonville | 3
2 | Columbus | 3
3 | Rochester | 1

Governors' Cup
4 | Jacksonville | 4
2 | Columbus | 0

== Awards ==
International League awards
| Award name | Recipient |
|---|---|
| Most Valuable Player | Merv Rettenmund, Rochester Red Wings |
| Pitcher of the Year | Dave Roberts, Columbus Jets |
| Rookie of the Year | Merv Rettenmund, Rochester Red Wings |
| Manager of the Year | Jack Tighe, Toledo Mud Hens |

== All-star team ==
International League all-star team
| Position | All-star |
|---|---|
| Catcher | Duffy Dyer, Jacksonville Suns; Manny Sanguillén, Columbus Jets |
| First base | Al Oliver, Columbus Jets |
| Second base | Dave Campbell, Toledo Mud Hens |
| Shortstop | Gil Garrido, Richmond Braves |
| Third base | Mike Ferraro, Syracuse Chiefs |
| Outfield | Bob Christian, Toledo Mud Hens; Amos Otis, Jacksonville Suns; Merv Rettenmund, Rochester Red Wings |
| Pitcher | Mike Marshall, Toledo Mud Hens; Dave Roberts, Columbus Jets |
| Manager | Jack Tighe, Toledo Mud Hens |

== See also ==
- 1968 Major League Baseball season
