= 1967 International League season =

- League: International League
- Sport: Baseball
- Duration: April 26 – September 15
- Games: 140
- Teams: 8

Regular season
- Season MVP: Tommie Aaron, Richmond Braves

Governors' Cup Playoffs
- League champions: Toledo Mud Hens
- Runners-up: Columbus Jets

IL seasons
- ← 1966 1968 →

The 1967 International League was a Class AAA baseball season played between April 25 and September 15. Eight teams played a 140-game schedule, with the top four teams qualifying for the post-season.

The Toledo Mud Hens won the Governors' Cup, defeating the Columbus Jets in the final round of the playoffs.

== Team changes ==
- The Syracuse Chiefs ended their affiliate with the Detroit Tigers and began an affiliation with the New York Yankees.
- The Toledo Mud Hens ended their affiliations with the New York Yankees and began an affiliation with the Detroit Tigers.

== Teams ==
1967 International League
Team	City	MLB Affiliate	Stadium
Buffalo Bisons	Buffalo, New York	Cincinnati Reds	War Memorial Stadium
Columbus Jets	Columbus, Ohio	Pittsburgh Pirates	Jets Stadium
Jacksonville Suns	Jacksonville, Florida	New York Mets	Wolfson Park
Richmond Braves	Richmond, Virginia	Atlanta Braves	Parker Field
Rochester Red Wings	Rochester, New York	Baltimore Orioles	Red Wing Stadium
Syracuse Chiefs	Syracuse, New York	New York Yankees	MacArthur Stadium
Toledo Mud Hens	Toledo, Ohio	Detroit Tigers	Lucas County Stadium
Toronto Maple Leafs	Toronto, Ontario	Boston Red Sox	Maple Leaf Stadium

== Map of teams ==
International League teams

== Regular season ==
=== Summary ===
- The Richmond Braves and Rochester Red Wings finished the season tied for first, so a one-game playoff took place to determine the winner. The Braves shutout the Red Wings 2-0 to clinch first place.
- The Richmond Braves finished with the best record in the league for the first time in franchise history.
- Jack Tighe of the Toledo Mud Hens was awarded the first ever International League Manager of the Year Award.

=== Standings ===
International League
Team	Win	Loss	%	GB
Richmond Braves	81	60	.574	–
Rochester Red Wings	80	61	.567	1
Toledo Mud Hens	73	66	.525	7
Columbus Jets	69	71	.493	11.5
Jacksonville Suns	66	73	.475	14
Toronto Maple Leafs	64	75	.460	16
Buffalo Bisons	63	76	.453	17
Syracuse Chiefs	63	77	.450	17.5

== League Leaders ==
=== Batting leaders ===
Stat	Player	Total
AVG	Elvio Jiménez, Columbus Jets	.340
H	Elvio Jiménez, Columbus Jets	164
R	Wayne Comer, Toledo Mud Hens	86
2B	Steve Demeter, Rochester Red Wings	32
3B	Tom Shopay, Syracuse Chiefs	13
HR	Jim Beauchamp, Richmond Braves	25
RBI	Curt Motton, Rochester Red Wings	70
SB	Freddie Patek, Columbus Jets	42

=== Pitching leaders ===
Stat	Player	Total
W	Dave Leonhard, Rochester Red Wings	15
L	Ernie Broglio, Buffalo Bisons	13
ERA	Tug McGraw, Jacksonville Suns	1.99
CG	Ron Reed, Richmond Braves	17
SHO	Tom Fisher, Rochester Red Wings; Ron Reed, Richmond Braves	5
SO	Jerry Koosman, Jacksonville Suns	183
IP	Ron Reed, Richmond Braves	222.0

== Playoffs ==
- The Toledo Mud Hens won their first Governors' Cup, defeating the Columbus Jets in five games.

=== Playoff bracket ===
Semi-finals
1	Richmond	2
3	Toledo	3
2	Rochester	1
4	Columbus	3

Governors' Cup
3	Toledo	4
4	Columbus	1

== Awards ==
International League awards
Award name	Recipient
Most Valuable Player	Tommie Aaron, Richmond Braves
Pitcher of the Year	Dave Leonhard, Rochester Red Wings
Rookie of the Year	Curt Motton, Rochester Red Wings
Manager of the Year	Jack Tighe, Toledo Mud Hens

== All-star team ==
International League all-star team
Position	All-star
Catcher	Johnny Bench, Buffalo Bisons; Chris Cannizzaro, Toledo Mud Hens
First base	Jim Beauchamp, Richmond Braves
Second base	Félix Millán, Richmond Braves
Shortstop	Tom Matchick, Toledo Mud Hens
Third base	Steve Demeter, Rochester Red Wings
Outfield	Tommie Aaron, Richmond Braves; Elvio Jiménez, Columbus Jets; Curt Motton, Rochester Red Wings
Pitcher	Dave Leonhard, Rochester Red Wings; Ron Reed, Richmond Braves; Bill Short, Columbus Jets
Manager	Jack Tighe, Toledo Mud Hens

== See also ==
- 1967 Major League Baseball season
