= 1963 International League season =

- League: International League
- Sport: Baseball
- Duration: April 16 – September 13
- Games: 152
- Teams: 10

Regular season
- Season MVP: Don Buford, Indianapolis Indians

Governors' Cup Playoffs
- League champions: Indianapolis Indians
- Runners-up: Atlanta Crackers

IL seasons
- ← 1962 1964 →

The 1963 International League was a Class AAA baseball season played between April 16 and September 13. Ten teams played a 152-game schedule, with the top two teams in each division qualifying for the playoffs.

The Indianapolis Indians won the Governors' Cup, defeating the Atlanta Crackers in the final round of the playoffs.

== Team changes ==
- The Indianapolis Indians joined the league after the American Association disbanded. The club was affiliated with the Chicago White Sox.
- The Arkansas Travelers join the league as an expansion team and begin an affiliation with the Philadelphia Phillies.
- With 10 teams in the league, the league split into two divisions, the North Division and South Division.
- The Buffalo Bisons ended their affiliation with the Philadelphia Phillies and began a new affiliation with the New York Mets.
- The Syracuse Chiefs ended their affiliation with the New York Mets and Washington Senators and began a new affiliation with the Detroit Tigers.
- The Toronto Maple Leafs ended their affiliation with the Milwaukee Braves and began a new affiliation with the Washington Senators.

== Teams ==
1963 International League
| Division | Team | City | MLB Affiliate | Stadium |
North
| North | Buffalo Bisons | Buffalo, New York | New York Mets | War Memorial Stadium |
| North | Richmond Virginians | Richmond, Virginia | New York Yankees | Parker Field |
| North | Rochester Red Wings | Rochester, New York | Baltimore Orioles | Red Wing Stadium |
| North | Syracuse Chiefs | Syracuse, New York | Detroit Tigers | MacArthur Stadium |
| North | Toronto Maple Leafs | Toronto, Ontario | Washington Senators | Maple Leaf Stadium |
South
| South | Arkansas Travelers | Little Rock, Arkansas | Philadelphia Phillies | Travelers Field |
| South | Atlanta Crackers | Atlanta, Georgia | St. Louis Cardinals | Ponce de Leon Park |
| South | Columbus Jets | Columbus, Ohio | Pittsburgh Pirates | Jets Stadium |
| South | Indianapolis Indians | Indianapolis, Indiana | Chicago White Sox | Victory Field |
| South | Jacksonville Suns | Jacksonville, Florida | Cleveland Indians | Jacksonville Baseball Park |

== Map of teams ==
North Division South Division

== Regular season ==
=== Summary ===
- The Atlanta Crackers and Indianapolis Indians finished tied for first place in the South Division and held a tie-breaking game to decide who finished in first place. The Indians defeated the Crackers 1–0 to win the South Division.
- The Indianapolis Indians finished with the best record in the league in their first season after joining from the American Association.

=== Standings ===
North Division
| Team | Win | Loss | % | GB |
|---|---|---|---|---|
| Syracuse Chiefs | 80 | 70 | .533 | – |
| Toronto Maple Leafs | 76 | 75 | .503 | 4.5 |
| Rochester Red Wings | 75 | 76 | .497 | 5.5 |
| Buffalo Bisons | 74 | 77 | .490 | 6.5 |
| Richmond Virginians | 66 | 81 | .449 | 12.5 |

South Division
| Team | Win | Loss | % | GB |
|---|---|---|---|---|
| Indianapolis Indians | 86 | 67 | .562 | – |
| Atlanta Crackers | 85 | 68 | .556 | 1 |
| Arkansas Travelers | 78 | 73 | .517 | 7 |
| Columbus Jets | 75 | 73 | .507 | 8.5 |
| Jacksonville Suns | 56 | 91 | .381 | 27 |

== League Leaders ==
=== Batting leaders ===
| Stat | Player | Total |
|---|---|---|
| AVG | Don Buford, Indianapolis Indians | .336 |
| H | Don Buford, Indianapolis Indians | 206 |
| R | Don Buford, Indianapolis Indians | 114 |
| 2B | Don Buford, Indianapolis Indians | 41 |
| 3B | Dick Allen, Arkansas Travelers | 12 |
| HR | Dick Allen, Arkansas Travelers | 33 |
| RBI | Dick Allen, Arkansas Travelers | 97 |
| SB | Don Buford, Indianapolis Indians | 42 |

=== Pitching leaders ===
| Stat | Player | Total |
|---|---|---|
| W | Fritz Ackley, Indianapolis Indians | 18 |
| L | John Miller, Rochester Red Wings; Tom Parsons, Columbus Jets | 15 |
| ERA | Willie Smith, Syracuse Chiefs | 2.11 |
| CG | Willie Smith, Syracuse Chiefs | 14 |
| SHO | Paul Brown, Arkansas Travelers; Nelson Chittum, Rochester Red Wings | 6 |
| SO | Frank Kreutzer, Indianapolis Indians | 157 |
| IP | Frank Kreutzer, Indianapolis Indians | 213.0 |

== Playoffs ==
- The Indianapolis Indians won their first Governors' Cup in their inaugural season, defeating the Atlanta Crackers in five games.

=== Playoff bracket ===
Semi-finals
S1 | Indianapolis | 4
N1 | Syracuse | 1
S2 | Atlanta | 4
N2 | Toronto | 0

Governors' Cup
S1 | Indianapolis | 4
S2 | Atlanta | 1

== Awards ==
Player awards
| Award name | Recipient |
|---|---|
| Most Valuable Player | Don Buford, Indianapolis Indians |
| Pitcher of the Year | Fritz Ackley, Indianapolis Indians |
| Rookie of the Year | Don Buford, Indianapolis Indians |

== See also ==
- 1963 Major League Baseball season
