= 1966 International League season =

- League: International League
- Sport: Baseball
- Duration: April 22 – September 16
- Games: 148
- Teams: 8

Regular season
- Season MVP: Mike Epstein, Rochester Red Wings

Governors' Cup Playoffs
- League champions: Toronto Maple Leafs
- Runners-up: Richmond Braves

IL seasons
- ← 1965 1967 →

The 1966 International League was a Class AAA baseball season played between April 22 and September 16. Eight teams played a 148-game schedule, with the top four teams qualifying for the post-season.

The Toronto Maple Leafs won the Governors' Cup, defeating the Richmond Braves in the final round of the playoffs.

== Team changes ==
- In Major League Baseball, the Milwaukee Braves relocated to Atlanta, Georgia and were renamed the Atlanta Braves. The Braves moved their International League team, the Atlanta Crackers, to Richmond, Virginia, and were renamed the Richmond Braves.
- The Buffalo Bisons ended their affiliations with the New York Mets and began an affiliation with the Cincinnati Reds.
- The Jacksonville Suns ended their affiliate with the St. Louis Cardinals and began an affiliation with the New York Mets.

== Teams ==
1966 International League
| Team | City | MLB Affiliate | Stadium |
| Buffalo Bisons | Buffalo, New York | Cincinnati Reds | War Memorial Stadium |
| Columbus Jets | Columbus, Ohio | Pittsburgh Pirates | Jets Stadium |
| Jacksonville Suns | Jacksonville, Florida | New York Mets | Wolfson Park |
| Richmond Braves | Richmond, Virginia | Atlanta Braves | Parker Field |
| Rochester Red Wings | Rochester, New York | Baltimore Orioles | Red Wing Stadium |
| Syracuse Chiefs | Syracuse, New York | Detroit Tigers | MacArthur Stadium |
| Toledo Mud Hens | Toledo, Ohio | New York Yankees | Lucas County Stadium |
| Toronto Maple Leafs | Toronto, Ontario | Boston Red Sox | Maple Leaf Stadium |

== Map of teams ==
International League teams

== Regular season ==
=== Summary ===
- The Rochester Red Wings finished with the best record in the league for the first time since 1953.

=== Standings ===
International League
| Team | Win | Loss | % | GB |
|---|---|---|---|---|
| Rochester Red Wings | 83 | 64 | .565 | – |
| Columbus Jets | 82 | 65 | .558 | 1 |
| Toronto Maple Leafs | 82 | 65 | .558 | 1 |
| Richmond Braves | 75 | 72 | .510 | 8 |
| Buffalo Bisons | 72 | 74 | .493 | 10.5 |
| Toledo Mud Hens | 71 | 75 | .486 | 11.5 |
| Jacksonville Suns | 68 | 79 | .463 | 15 |
| Syracuse Chiefs | 54 | 93 | .367 | 29 |

== League Leaders ==
=== Batting leaders ===
| Stat | Player | Total |
|---|---|---|
| AVG | Reggie Smith, Toronto Maple Leafs | .320 |
| H | Steve Demeter, Rochester Red Wings | 166 |
| R | Mike Andrews, Toronto Maple Leafs | 97 |
| 2B | Steve Demeter, Rochester Red Wings | 32 |
| 3B | Mike Hegan, Toledo Mud Hens | 11 |
| HR | Mike Epstein, Rochester Red Wings | 29 |
| RBI | Mike Epstein, Rochester Red Wings | 102 |
| SB | George Spriggs, Columbus Jets | 34 |

=== Pitching leaders ===
| Stat | Player | Total |
|---|---|---|
| W | Gary Waslewski, Toronto Maple Leafs | 18 |
| L | Bill Graham, Syracuse Chiefs | 16 |
| ERA | Dick Kelley, Richmond Braves | 2.08 |
| CG | Wilbur Wood, Columbus Jets | 15 |
| SHO | Wilbur Wood, Columbus Jets | 8 |
| SO | Tom Phoebus, Rochester Red Wings | 208 |
| IP | Wilbur Wood, Columbus Jets | 224.0 |

== Playoffs ==
- The Toronto Maple Leafs won their second consecutive Governors' Cup, and fourth overall, defeating the Richmond Braves in five games.
- The semi-finals were shortened from a best-of-seven series to a best-of-five.

=== Playoff bracket ===
Semi-finals
1 | Rochester | 1
4 | Richmond | 3
2 | Columbus | 2
3 | Toronto | 3

Governors' Cup
4 | Richmond | 1
3 | Toronto | 4

== Awards ==
Player awards
| Award name | Recipient |
|---|---|
| Most Valuable Player | Mike Epstein, Rochester Red Wings |
| Pitcher of the Year | Gary Waslewski, Toronto Maple Leafs |
| Rookie of the Year | Mike Epstein, Rochester Red Wings |

== See also ==
- 1966 Major League Baseball season
