= 1969 International League season =

- League: International League
- Sport: Baseball
- Duration: April 18 – September 12
- Games: 140
- Teams: 8

Regular season
- Season MVP: Luis Alvarado, Louisville Colonels

Governors' Cup Playoffs
- League champions: Syracuse Chiefs
- Runners-up: Columbus Jets

IL seasons
- ← 1968 1970 →

The 1969 International League was a Class AAA baseball season played between April 18 and September 12. Eight teams played a 140-game schedule, with the top four teams qualifying for the post-season.

The Syracuse Chiefs won the Governors' Cup, defeating the Columbus Jets in the final round of the playoffs.

== Team changes ==
- The Jacksonville Suns relocated to Norfolk, Virginia and were renamed the Tidewater Tides. The club remained affiliated with the New York Mets.

== Teams ==
1969 International League
Team	City	MLB Affiliate	Stadium
Buffalo Bisons	Buffalo, New York	Washington Senators	War Memorial Stadium
Columbus Jets	Columbus, Ohio	Pittsburgh Pirates	Jets Stadium
Louisville Colonels	Louisville, Kentucky	Boston Red Sox	Fairgrounds Stadium
Richmond Braves	Richmond, Virginia	Atlanta Braves	Parker Field
Rochester Red Wings	Rochester, New York	Baltimore Orioles	Silver Stadium
Syracuse Chiefs	Syracuse, New York	New York Yankees	MacArthur Stadium
Tidewater Tides	Norfolk, Virginia	New York Mets	Frank D. Lawrence Stadium
Toledo Mud Hens	Toledo, Ohio	Detroit Tigers	Lucas County Stadium

== Map of teams ==
International League teams

== Regular season ==
=== Summary ===
- The Tidewater Tides finished with the best record in the league for their inaugural season.

=== Standings ===
International League
Team	Win	Loss	%	GB
Tidewater Tides	76	59	.563	–
Louisville Colonels	77	63	.550	1.5
Syracuse Chiefs	75	65	.536	3.5
Columbus Jets	74	66	.529	4.5
Rochester Red Wings	71	69	.507	7.5
Toledo Mud Hens	68	72	.486	10.5
Buffalo Bisons	58	78	.426	18.5
Richmond Braves	56	83	.403	22

== League Leaders ==
=== Batting leaders ===
Stat	Player	Total
AVG	Ralph Garr, Richmond Braves	.329
H	Luis Alvarado, Louisville Colonels	166
R	Luis Alvarado, Louisville Colonels	89
2B	Luis Alvarado, Louisville Colonels	30
3B	Dave Cash, Columbus Jets	12
HR	Bob Robertson, Columbus Jets	34
RBI	Roy Foster, Tidewater Tides	92
SB	Ralph Garr, Richmond Braves	63

=== Pitching leaders ===
Stat	Player	Total
W	Fred Beene, Rochester Red Wings; Gerry Janeski, Louisville Colonels; Ron Klimkowski, Syracuse Chiefs	15
ERA	Ron Klimkowski, Syracuse Chiefs	2.18
CG	Gerry Janeski, Louisville Colonels	14
SHO	Fred Beene, Rochester Red Wings	4
SO	Mike Adamson, Rochester Red Wings	133
IP	Fred Beene, Rochester Red Wings	193.0

== Playoffs ==
- The Syracuse Chiefs won their sixth Governors' Cup, defeating the Columbus Jets in five games.

=== Playoff bracket ===
Semi-finals
1	Tidewater	1
4	Columbus	3
2	Louisville	2
3	Syracuse	3

Governors' Cup
4	Columbus	1
3	Syracuse	4

== Awards ==
International League awards
Award name	Recipient
Most Valuable Player	Luis Alvarado, Louisville Colonels
Pitcher of the Year	Ron Klimkowski, Syracuse Chiefs
Rookie of the Year	Luis Alvarado, Louisville Colonels
Manager of the Year	Clyde McCullough, Tidewater Tides

== All-star team ==
International League all-star team
Position	All-star
Catcher	Hal King, Louisville Colonels; Bob Montgomery, Louisville Colonels
First base	Bob Robertson, Columbus Jets
Second base	Dave Cash, Columbus Jets
Shortstop	Luis Alvarado, Louisville Colonels
Third base	Mike Ferraro, Rochester Red Wings
Outfield	Terry Crowley, Rochester Red Wings; Roy Foster, Tidewater Tides; Ralph Garr, Richmond Braves
Pitcher	Ron Klimkowski, Syracuse Chiefs; Jon Matlack, Tidewater Tides
Manager	Clyde McCullough, Tidewater Tides

== See also ==
- 1969 Major League Baseball season
