= 1971 International League season =

- League: International League
- Sport: Baseball
- Duration: April 16 – September 13
- Games: 140
- Teams: 8

Regular season
- Season MVP: Bobby Grich, Rochester Red Wings

Governors' Cup Playoffs
- League champions: Rochester Red Wings
- Runners-up: Tidewater Tides

IL seasons
- ← 1970 1972 →

The 1971 International League was a Class AAA baseball season played between April 16 and September 13. Eight teams played a 140-game schedule, with the top four teams qualifying for the post-season.

The Rochester Red Wings won the Governors' Cup, defeating the Tidewater Tides in the final round of the playoffs.

== Team changes ==
- The Columbus Jets relocated to Charleston, West Virginia and were renamed the Charleston Charlies. The club remained affiliated with the Pittsburgh Pirates.

== Teams ==
1971 International League
Team	City	MLB Affiliate	Stadium
Charleston Charlies	Charleston, West Virginia	Pittsburgh Pirates	Watt Powell Park
Louisville Colonels	Louisville, Kentucky	Boston Red Sox	Fairgrounds Stadium
Richmond Braves	Richmond, Virginia	Atlanta Braves	Parker Field
Rochester Red Wings	Rochester, New York	Baltimore Orioles	Silver Stadium
Syracuse Chiefs	Syracuse, New York	New York Yankees	MacArthur Stadium
Tidewater Tides	Norfolk, Virginia	New York Mets	Met Park
Toledo Mud Hens	Toledo, Ohio	Detroit Tigers	Lucas County Stadium
Winnipeg Whips	Winnipeg, Manitoba	Montreal Expos	Winnipeg Stadium

== Map of teams ==
International League teams

== Regular season ==
=== Summary ===
- The Rochester Red Wings finished with the best record in the league for the first time since 1966.
- On June 24, 1971, an International League all-star team beat the New York Yankees, 15–13, in an exhibition game at Silver Stadium in Rochester, New York, before a crowd of 11,001—notable players on the all-star squad included Don Baylor, Carlton Fisk, and Bobby Grich.

=== Standings ===
International League
Team	Win	Loss	%	GB
Rochester Red Wings	86	54	.614	–
Tidewater Tides	79	61	.564	7
Charleston Charlies	78	62	.557	8
Syracuse Chiefs	73	67	.521	13
Louisville Colonels	71	69	.507	15
Richmond Braves	69	71	.493	17
Toledo Mud Hens	60	80	.429	26
Winnipeg Whips	44	96	.314	42

== League Leaders ==
=== Batting leaders ===
Stat	Player	Total
AVG	Bobby Grich, Rochester Red Wings	.336
H	Johnny Jeter, Charleston Charlies	168
R	Bobby Grich, Rochester Red Wings	124
2B	Don Baylor, Rochester Red Wings; Leroy Stanton, Tidewater Tides	31
3B	Juan Beníquez, Louisville Colonels	16
HR	Bobby Grich, Rochester Red Wings	32
RBI	Richie Zisk, Charleston Charlies	109
SB	Johnny Jeter, Charleston Charlies	36

=== Pitching leaders ===
Stat	Player	Total
W	Jim Bibby, Tidewater Tides; Roric Harrison, Rochester Red Wings	15
ERA	Buzz Capra, Tidewater Tides	2.19
CG	Lynn McGlothen, Louisville Colonels	13
SHO	Buzz Capra, Tidewater Tides	6
SV	Don Koonce, Tidewater Tides	15
SO	Roric Harrison, Rochester Red Wings	182
IP	Gary Neibauer, Richmond Braves	194.0

== Playoffs ==
- The Rochester Red Wings won their sixth Governors' Cup, defeating the Tidewater Tides in five games.

=== Playoff bracket ===
Semi-finals
1	Rochester	3
4	Syracuse	1
2	Tidewater	3
3	Charleston	0

Governors' Cup
1	Rochester	3
2	Tidewater	2

== Awards ==
International League awards
Award name	Recipient
Most Valuable Player	Bobby Grich, Rochester Red Wings
Pitcher of the Year	Roric Harrison, Rochester Red Wings
Rookie of the Year	Rusty Torres, Syracuse Chiefs
Manager of the Year	Joe Altobelli, Rochester Red Wings

== All-star team ==
International League all-star team
Position	All-star
Catcher	Johnny Oates, Rochester Red Wings; George Pena, Syracuse Chiefs
First base	Dave McDonald, Winnipeg Whips
Second base	Rennie Stennett, Charleston Charlies
Shortstop	Bobby Grich, Rochester Red Wings
Third base	Len Boehmer, Syracuse Chiefs
Outfield	Don Baylor, Rochester Red Wings; Johnny Jeter, Charleston Charlies; Leroy Stanton, Tidewater Tides
Pitcher	Roric Harrison, Rochester Red Wings; Brent Strom, Tidewater Tides
Manager	Joe Altobelli, Rochester Red Wings

== See also ==
- 1971 Major League Baseball season
