= Cal Ermer =

American baseball player, manager, and scout (1923–2009)

- Second baseman / Manager
- Born: November 10, 1923; Baltimore, Maryland, U.S.
- Died: August 8, 2009 (aged 85); Chattanooga, Tennessee, U.S.
- Batted: Right Threw: Right

MLB debut
- September 26, 1947, for the Washington Senators

Last MLB appearance
- September 26, 1947, for the Washington Senators

MLB statistics
- Batting average: .000
- At bats: 3
- Hits: 0
- Managerial record: 145–129 (.529)
- Stats at Baseball Reference
- Managerial record at Baseball Reference

Teams
- As player: Washington Senators (1947); As manager: Minnesota Twins (1967–1968)

Calvin Coolidge Ermer (November 10, 1923 – August 8, 2009) was an American second baseman, manager, coach and scout in Major League Baseball. He was born in Baltimore, Maryland, the youngest of seven children, attended Patterson High School, and served in the United States Marine Corps during World War II. As a player, Ermer threw and batted right-handed, stood 6 feet (1.8 m) tall and weighed 175 pounds (79 kg).

== Longtime employee of Senators and Twins ==
Ermer played in the minor leagues from 1942 to 1951, losing three seasons (1943–1945) to wartime military service. Most of Ermer's 60-plus-year career in baseball was spent as an employee of the Minnesota Twins and its predecessor franchise (before 1961), the Washington Senators. His only major league game as a player, on September 26, 1947, came with Washington; he was hitless in three at bats against Bill McCahan of the Philadelphia Athletics at Griffith Stadium, and handled seven fielding chances flawlessly as a second baseman. Washington won the game, 4–3.

Ermer also played and managed in the club's farm system, handling Senators/Twins farm clubs over five different decades, beginning with the Charlotte Hornets in 1947 and ending with the Toledo Mud Hens in 1985. He also served as a skipper in the minor league systems of the Pittsburgh Pirates and New York Yankees, and in 1958 won The Sporting News Minor League Manager of the Year award while with the Birmingham Barons, then a farm team of the Detroit Tigers. His minor league teams won championships in 1947 and 1958.

== Major league manager ==
On June 9, 1967, Ermer was promoted from the Twins' Triple-A affiliate, the Denver Bears of the Pacific Coast League, to replace Minnesota manager Sam Mele. Under Ermer, the Twins won 66 of 112 games and jumped into a four-team American League pennant race (with the Tigers, Boston Red Sox and Chicago White Sox) that went down to the season's final weekend. Needing only one win in two games at Boston's Fenway Park to clinch a tie for the championship, the Twins lost both contests to the Red Sox, who became improbable league champions.

Ermer was brought back for 1968, but a big off-season trade with the Los Angeles Dodgers backfired, Baseball Hall of Fame slugger Harmon Killebrew suffered a serious hamstring injury during the 1968 Major League Baseball All-Star Game, nearly ending his career, and the Twins tumbled to 79–83 and a seventh-place finish. At season's end, Ermer was fired and replaced by his former coach Billy Martin. It was Martin's first big-league managing assignment.

== Late career ==
The Twins' job (his final record: 145–129, .529) was his only Major League managerial opportunity, but Ermer also served as an MLB coach for the Baltimore Orioles (1962), Milwaukee Brewers (1970–1972) and Oakland Athletics (1977). He ultimately returned to the Twins to manage their Triple-A farm club, then the Toledo Mud Hens, from 1978–1985 before spending many years as a Minnesota scout. As a minor league pilot, Ermer won 1,906 games, losing 1,728 (.524) over 26 seasons.

Cal Ermer died at age 85 in Chattanooga, Tennessee, on August 8, 2009. Almost a year before, on August 30, 2008, the Chattanooga Lookouts (which he managed from 1952–1857 and led to the 1952 Southern Association pennant) dedicated their press box to Ermer. He had met and married Gloria Williams (Miss Chattanooga and Miss Tennessee of 1952) and had two sons, David and Michael. He lived in Chattanooga for 57 years. Ermer was also soccer coach for the University of Baltimore and managed baseball teams in the winter leagues. He was buried in Chattanooga's National Cemetery.

Sporting positions
Preceded by Jack Onslow	Chattanooga Lookouts manager 1952–1957	Succeeded by Red Marion
Preceded by Johnny Pesky	Birmingham Barons manager 1958	Succeeded by Skeeter Newsome
Preceded by Clyde King	Columbus Jets manager 1959–1960	Succeeded by Larry Shepard
Preceded by Steve Souchock	Richmond Virginians manager 1961	Succeeded by Sheriff Robinson
Preceded by Lum Harris	Baltimore Orioles third base coach 1962	Succeeded by Luke Appling
Preceded by Bill Adair	Denver Bears manager 1965–1967	Succeeded by Johnny Goryl
Preceded by Frankie Crosetti (Seattle Pilots)	Milwaukee Brewers third base coach 1970–1972	Succeeded by Joe Nossek
Preceded by Kerby Farrell	Tacoma Twins manager 1974–1976	Succeeded by Del Wilber
Preceded by Joe Lonnett	Oakland Athletics third base coach 1977	Succeeded by Jack McKeon
Preceded by Jack Cassini	Toledo Mud Hens manager 1978–1985	Succeeded by Charlie Manuel
