= Tommie Aaron =

American baseball player and coach (1939–1984)

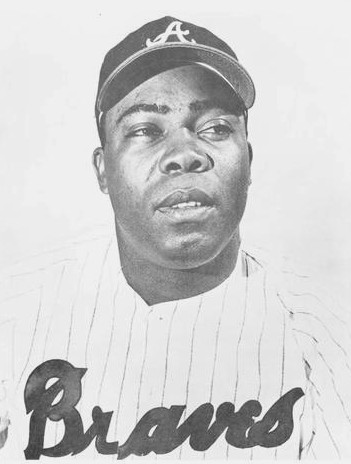
- Aaron with the Atlanta Braves in 1968
- Outfielder
- Born: August 5, 1939; Mobile, Alabama, U.S.
- Died: August 16, 1984 (aged 45); Atlanta, Georgia, U.S.
- Batted: Right Threw: Right

MLB debut
- April 10, 1962, for the Milwaukee Braves

Last MLB appearance
- September 24, 1971, for the Atlanta Braves

MLB statistics
- Batting average: .229
- Home runs: 13
- Runs batted in: 94
- Stats at Baseball Reference

Teams
- As player: Milwaukee / Atlanta Braves (1962–1965, 1968–1971); As coach: Atlanta Braves (1978–1984)

Tommie Lee Aaron (August 5, 1939 – August 16, 1984) was an American professional baseball player and coach. He played as a first baseman and left fielder in Major League Baseball. Aaron was the younger brother of Hall of Fame member Hank Aaron. They were the first siblings to appear in a League Championship Series as teammates.

== Baseball career ==
Born in Mobile, Alabama, Aaron was signed by the Milwaukee Braves on May 28, 1958, at the age of 18. He played for both the Milwaukee Braves (1962–1963, 1965) and the Atlanta Braves (1968–1971). During the course of his development as a player, Tommie Aaron played for the Richmond Braves of the International League in the mid-1960s, where he was International League MVP in 1967. After his playing days, he worked for the organization as a minor league manager (1973–1978) and major league coach (1979–1984).

Aaron hit a total of 13 major league home runs, with eight of them coming in his first year of 1962. Along with his brother's then Major League record 755, they hold the Major League record for the most career home runs by two brothers (768). The only other brother of a 500-home run man to play in the majors was Rich Murray (brother of Eddie Murray), who hit four home runs in a brief major league career.

Aaron finished his career with a lifetime batting average of .229, 13 HR, 94 RBI, and 102 runs scored in 437 games.

== Personal life ==
Aaron was married to Carolyn Davenporte on October 13, 1962. They had three children: Efrem, Tommie Jr., and Veleeta.

== Death ==
Aaron died from leukemia on August 16, 1984, and was buried in the Catholic Cemetery of Mobile, Alabama. Tommie Aaron was 45 years old.

== Legacy ==
Posthumously, the Richmond Braves minor league baseball team established the Tommie Aaron Memorial Award for the team's most valuable player, awarded annually until the affiliate relocated to Georgia for the 2009 season. The Braves' AAA club (now the Gwinnett Stripers), have retired his No. 23.

== Career statistics ==
Career Hitting
G	AB	H	2B	3B	HR	R	RBI	SB	BB	SO	AVG	OBP	SLG	OPS
437	944	216	42	6	13	102	94	9	86	145	.229	.292	.327	.619
