= Rob Gardner (baseball) =

American baseball player (1944–2023)

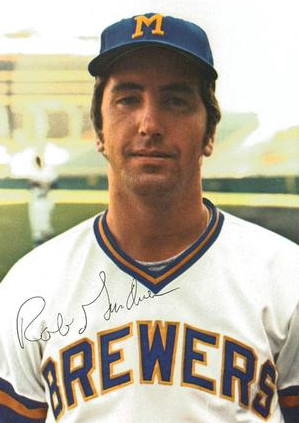
- Gardner in 1973
- Pitcher
- Born: December 19, 1944; Binghamton, New York, U.S.
- Died: October 21, 2023 (aged 78); Binghamton, New York, U.S.
- Batted: Right Threw: Left

MLB debut
- September 1, 1965, for the New York Mets

Last MLB appearance
- July 13, 1973, for the Milwaukee Brewers

MLB statistics
- Win–loss record: 14–18
- Earned run average: 4.35
- Strikeouts: 193
- Stats at Baseball Reference

Teams
- New York Mets (1965–1966); Chicago Cubs (1967); Cleveland Indians (1968); New York Yankees (1970); Oakland Athletics (1971); New York Yankees (1971–1972); Oakland Athletics (1973); Milwaukee Brewers (1973)

Richard Frank Gardner (December 19, 1944 – October 21, 2023) was an American professional baseball pitcher. He played in Major League Baseball for the New York Mets, Chicago Cubs, Cleveland Indians, New York Yankees, Oakland Athletics, and Milwaukee Brewers from 1965 to 1973.

== Early years ==
Gardner originally signed with the Minnesota Twins in 1963 upon graduation from Binghamton High School in Binghamton, New York. He went 17–11 with a 2.46 earned run average his only season in their farm system. Following the season, he was drafted by the New York Mets in the 1963 first-year draft.

== New York Mets ==
Gardner went 20–10 with a 3.51 ERA over two seasons in the Mets' farm system to earn a call up to the majors in September 1965. He lasted just three innings in his first major league start, giving up seven runs (five earned) in an 8–5 loss to the Houston Astros. However, his most memorable start of the season was his final, in which he pitched fifteen innings of shutout ball against the Philadelphia Phillies in a game that was eventually declared a 0–0 tie after eighteen innings.

After getting off to a 2–0 start in 1966, Gardner lost his next six decisions, and was moved into the bullpen. He earned his first major league save July 26 against the Astros, and finished the season at 4–8 with a 5.12 ERA. He started the 1967 season in the minors, and was shipped to the Chicago Cubs on June 12 with a minor league player to be named later for Bob Hendley.

== Cubs and Indians ==
Gardner spent one season in Chicago, going 0–2 with a 3.98 ERA for the Cubs. Just prior to the start of the 1968 season, he was traded to the Cleveland Indians for Bobby Tiefenauer. He went 9–6 with a 4.32 ERA for the Portland Beavers, and made five appearances for the Indians that September.

Gardner was 0–6 with Portland in 1969 when the Indians struck a deal with the New York Yankees for John Orsino.

== Two trades for two Alou brothers ==
Gardner finished the 1969 season with the Yankees' triple A affiliate, the Syracuse Chiefs. He went 16–5 with a 2.53 ERA for Syracuse in 1970, and appeared in one game for the Yankees that September.

Gardner was traded along with Ron Klimkowski from the Yankees to the Oakland Athletics for Felipe Alou on April 9, 1971. He was sent back to the Yankees with Darrell Osteen for Curt Blefary on May 25, 1971.

Gardner appeared in twenty games and pitched 97 innings for the Yankees in 1972, which was the most he'd pitched since 1966 with the Mets. Following the season, the Yankees traded him back to the A's with a player to be named later for Matty Alou.

Gardner appeared in three games for the A's in 1973 when his contract was purchased by the Milwaukee Brewers. He appeared in ten games for the Brewers, the last of which, he lasted just a third of an inning and gave up four runs to the A's. Following the game, he was returned to the A's. He spent 1974 in the Detroit Tigers' organization at Triple-A, then in 1975 was back in the Yankees' farm system with the Syracuse Chiefs as pitching coach for manager Bobby Cox and even appeared in 10 games before announcing his retirement as an active player.

== Later life and death ==
Gardner returned to Binghamton where he worked as a fireman and paramedic. He died in Binghamton, New York, on October 21, 2023, at the age of 78, and was survived by his two children, three grandchildren, sister, niece and great nephew.
