= Ted Savage =

American baseball player (1937–2023)

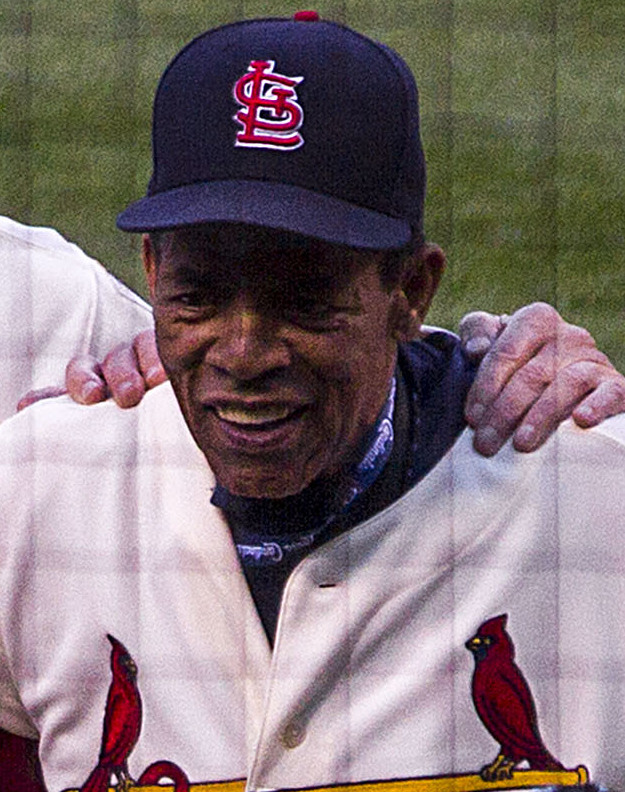
- Savage in 2017
- Outfielder
- Born: February 21, 1937; Venice, Illinois, U.S.
- Died: January 12, 2023 (aged 85); St. Louis, Missouri, U.S.
- Batted: Right Threw: Right

MLB debut
- April 9, 1962, for the Philadelphia Phillies

Last MLB appearance
- July 3, 1971, for the Kansas City Royals

MLB statistics
- Batting average: .233
- Home runs: 34
- Runs batted in: 163
- Stats at Baseball Reference

Teams
- Philadelphia Phillies (1962); Pittsburgh Pirates (1963); St. Louis Cardinals (1965–1967); Chicago Cubs (1967–1968); Los Angeles Dodgers (1968); Cincinnati Reds (1969); Milwaukee Brewers (1970–1971); Kansas City Royals (1971)

Theodore Savage Jr. (born Ephesian Savage; February 21, 1937 – January 12, 2023) was an American professional baseball outfielder who played in Major League Baseball (MLB) from 1962 to 1971. He played for the Philadelphia Phillies, Pittsburgh Pirates, St. Louis Cardinals, Chicago Cubs, Los Angeles Dodgers, Cincinnati Reds, Milwaukee Brewers, and Kansas City Royals.

== Early life ==
Savage was born in Venice, Illinois, in 1937. He graduated from East St. Louis Lincoln High School in East St. Louis, Illinois, where he starred in baseball, basketball, and football. Savage then attended Lincoln University in Jefferson City, Missouri, before serving for three years in the U.S. Army.

== Major league career ==
Savage signed as an amateur free agent in 1960 with the Philadelphia Phillies. He played for the Buffalo Bisons of the International League in 1961, batting .325, which led the league. He won the International League Most Valuable Player Award.

Savage made his major league debut with the Phillies on April 9, 1962, in a 12–4 road win over the Cincinnati Reds at Crosley Field. Pinch-hitting for Wes Covington against Bob Miller, he grounded out but stayed in the game, playing left field. After grounding out again, in the seventh inning he notched his first major league hit and RBI with a single off pitcher Dave Hillman that drove in Tony Gonzalez. He later had another RBI single that scored Gonzalez again, off pitcher Jim Brosnan.

On November 28, 1962, Savage was traded to the Pittsburgh Pirates along with Pancho Herrera in exchange for Don Hoak. In 85 games with the Pirates, he batted .195 with five home runs and 14 runs batted in (RBI). After the 1964 season, the Pirates traded Savage and Earl Francis to the St. Louis Cardinals for Jack Damaska and Ron Cox.

On May 14, 1967, the Chicago Cubs acquired Savage from the Cardinals with John Kindl for Don Young and Jim Procopio. On April 23, 1968, the Cubs traded Savage and Jim Ellis to the Los Angeles Dodgers for Phil Regan and Jim Hickman. He batted .209 in 64 games in the 1968 season. Before the 1969 season, the Dodgers traded Savage to the Cincinnati Reds for Jimmie Schaffer. The Reds sold Savage to the Milwaukee Brewers before the 1970 season. Savage had perhaps the best season of his career in 1970, playing in 114 games and batting .279 with 12 home runs, 50 RBI and a .402 slugging percentage in 343 plate appearances.

On May 11, 1971, the Brewers traded Savage to the Kansas City Royals for Tommy Matchick. Savage's final game was on July 3, 1971, in a 1–0 home loss to the Chicago White Sox. In the game, he recorded his final career hit, a single off Tommy John. He ended his playing career with 642 games played, posting a .233 average with 34 home runs and 163 RBI.

== Personal life and death ==
After his baseball career ended, he earned a PhD in urban studies from Saint Louis University and spent nine years as athletic director at Harris–Stowe State University in St. Louis. In 1987, Savage was hired by the St. Louis Cardinals as assistant director of community relations and a minor-league instructor.

In 2006, Savage was inducted into the Lincoln University Alumni Hall of Fame. The Buffalo Bisons inducted Savage into their team's hall of fame in 2016.

After a 25-year career with the Cardinals, Savage retired in 2012 as director of target marketing in the Cardinals Care and community relations department. In 2013, the 24th annual golf Cardinals Care tournament hosted by Savage was renamed the Ted Savage RBI Golf Classic to raise funds for the Reviving Baseball in Inner Cities (RBI) program.

Savage died on January 12, 2023, at age 85.
