= Pancho Herrera =

Cuban baseball player (1934-2005)

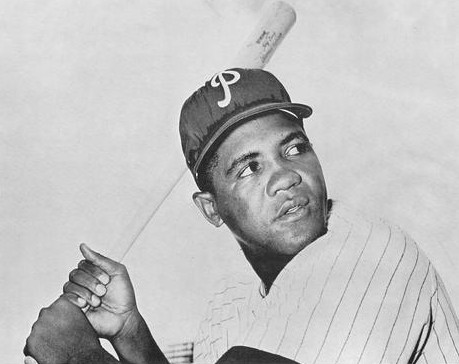
- Herrera in 1961
- First baseman
- Born: June 16, 1934; Santiago de Las Vegas, Cuba
- Died: April 28, 2005 (aged 70); Miami, Florida, U.S.
- Batted: Right Threw: Right

MLB debut
- April 15, 1958, for the Philadelphia Phillies

Last MLB appearance
- October 1, 1961, for the Philadelphia Phillies

MLB statistics
- Batting average: .271
- Home runs: 31
- Runs batted in: 128
- Stats at Baseball Reference

Teams
- Philadelphia Phillies (1958, 1960–1961)

Juan Francisco Herrera Villavicencio (June 16, 1934 – April 28, 2005), nicknamed "Pancho" and "Frank", was a Cuban-born professional baseball player. He appeared in exactly 300 games over all or part of three seasons in Major League Baseball for the Philadelphia Phillies between 1958 and 1961, primarily as a first baseman. He also played for the Kansas City Monarchs in the Negro American League, from whom he was purchased by the Phillies in 1954. A prodigious minor-league slugger, Herrera was listed at 6 feet 3 inches (1.91 m) tall and 220 pounds (100 kg); he threw and batted right-handed. He was the first Afro-Latino to play for the Phillies.

== Early career ==
Born in Santiago de las Vegas, near Havana, Herrera began his organized baseball career in the higher levels of the Phillies' farm system in 1955. As a 23-year-old prospect, he spent 1957 with the Miami Marlins of the International League, where he, Woody Smith, Mickey Micelotta and Bobby Young were considered to be one of the best infields in the circuit; one writer said, "They make plays the Phillies couldn't make." That season, Herrera batted .306 with 173 hits, 17 home runs and 93 runs batted in.

== With the Phillies ==
He began 1958 on Philadelphia's 28-man National League roster, but went hitless in 11 at bats and was sent back to Miami in May when rosters were cut to 25. After batting .282 with 20 homers for the 1958 Marlins, he was recalled to the Phillies in September when squads could carry 40 players. He started 15 late-season games at third base, and got untracked at the plate in a five-game stretch from September 13–17, going 12 for 19, raising his average from .053 to .342, and hitting his first major-league home run off left-hander Bill Henry of the Chicago Cubs on the 16th at Connie Mack Stadium. He finished his first MLB season with a respectable batting mark of .270 and 17 hits.

But Herrera could not make the 1959 Phillies. A December 1958 leg injury sidelined him during Cuba's winter league season, and he gained unneeded weight. Although his leg had healed by the time the 1959 campaign began, Herrera was back in the International League, this time as a member of the Buffalo Bisons, the Phils' new Triple-A affiliate. Herrera proceeded to win the league's Most Valuable Player award and its Triple Crown, pacing all hitters in home runs (37), runs batted in (128), and batting average (.329), as well as in hits (187). He was also elected to the league's All-Star team as a first baseman.

That banner year at Triple-A set the stage for 1960, Herrera's most productive campaign as a major leaguer. He appeared in 145 games, starting the season in the unlikely role of the Phillies' regular second baseman before permanently shifting to first base in May. He collected 144 hits, homered 17 times, added 26 doubles and six triples, and batted .281 for the season; he posted an OPS of .803. He also led National League batters with 136 strikeouts, a league record at the time (it would be broken by Dick Allen four years later). Herrera also committed more errors (13) than any other first baseman in the league. Still, Herrera finished a distant second to Frank Howard in that year's Rookie of the Year balloting. But he couldn't build on that success. Although he started 1961 as the Phillies' regular first baseman, his production seriously declined: his OPS dropped to .759 on 32 extra-base hits (including 13 home runs) and his batting average dipped 23 points to .258. He continued to strike out at an alarming rate, with 120 whiffs, second in the National League. That off-season, Philadelphia traded for veteran American League slugger Roy Sievers to take over as the club's first baseman for 1962, and Herrera played the rest of his career in the minor leagues.

== Minor league slugger ==
He had another strong season for Buffalo in 1962, making the All-Star team and leading the International League in home runs (32) and tying for the RBI title (108). At season's end, the Phillies used him and outfielder Ted Savage in a trade with the Pittsburgh Pirates for veteran third baseman Don Hoak. He played another seven years of minor league baseball, including four more seasons in the International League, before retiring in 1969, although he continued to play sporadically until 1974. After that he managed in both the Mexican and Florida State leagues. He continued to hit the long ball, especially late in his career in the Class A Mexican Southeast League, where he was a player-manager in the late 1960s.

As a big leaguer, Herrera collected 264 hits, with 46 doubles, eight triples, 31 homers and 128 career RBIs. He struck out 270 times, and batted .271 lifetime.

In 1980, Herrera managed the Colombia national baseball team in the qualifiers for the 1980 Amateur World Series; former Colombia skipper Antonio Torres (baseball) was on his coaching staff.

He died in Miami from a heart attack at age 70 in 2005.

Herrera was elected to the International League Hall of Fame in 2008.
