= George Spriggs (baseball) =

American baseball player (1937–2020)

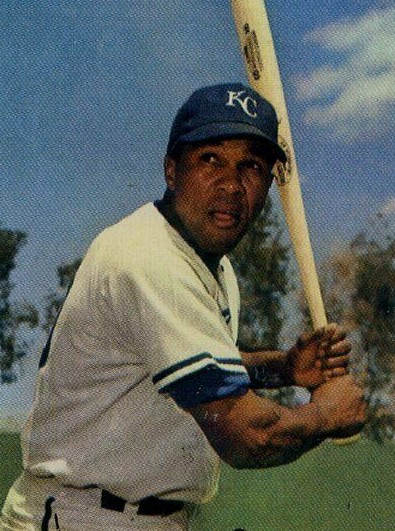
- Outfielder
- Born: May 22, 1937; Jewell, Maryland, U.S.
- Died: December 22, 2020 (aged 83); Prince Frederick, Maryland, U.S.
- Batted: Left Threw: Right

MLB debut
- September 15, 1965, for the Pittsburgh Pirates

Last MLB appearance
- October 1, 1970, for the Kansas City Royals

MLB statistics
- At bats: 225
- RBI: 12
- Home runs: 1
- Batting average: .191
- Stats at Baseball Reference

Teams
- Pittsburgh Pirates (1965–1967); Kansas City Royals (1969–1970)

George Herman Spriggs (May 22, 1937 – December 22, 2020) was an American professional baseball outfielder. He played in Major League Baseball for the Pittsburgh Pirates and the Kansas City Royals in parts of four seasons spanning from 1965 to 1970.

He was signed as an amateur free agent prior to the 1963 season by the Pittsburgh Pirates, after attending Wiley H. Bates High School in Annapolis, Maryland.

Previously, Spriggs played for various Negro league clubs, most prominently with the Detroit-New Orleans Stars in 1960.

In 1966, during his minor league career, Spriggs led the International League with 34 stolen bases and hit .300 for the Columbus Jets. Overall, in seasons with the Jets, he stole 170 bases.

In 1967, he was selected by the Boston Red Sox during the Rule 5 draft, but was returned to the Pirates in April 1968 when he did not make the Red Sox major league roster. His contract was purchased by the Kansas City Royals in October from the Pirates. Afterwards, the New York Mets purchased his contract in 1971, but he never played a major league game with them.

Spriggs won the 1970 American Association Most Valuable Player Award with the Omaha Royals.
