= Jack Damaska =

American baseball player (born 1937)

- Second baseman / Left fielder
- Born: August 21, 1937 (age 88); Beaver Falls, Pennsylvania, U.S.
- Batted: Right Threw: Right

MLB debut
- July 3, 1963, for the St. Louis Cardinals

Last MLB appearance
- July 20, 1963, for the St. Louis Cardinals

MLB statistics
- Batting average: .200
- At bats: 5
- Hits: 1
- Runs batted in: 1
- Stats at Baseball Reference

Teams
- St. Louis Cardinals (1963)

Jack Lloyd Damaska (born August 21, 1937) is an American former professional baseball player. He appeared as a pinch hitter, second baseman and left fielder in five Major League games for the 1963 St. Louis Cardinals. Listed at 5 feet 11 inches (1.80 m) tall and 168 pounds (76 kg), Damaska batted and threw right-handed. He was born in Beaver Falls, Pennsylvania.

Signed by the Cardinals in 1957, Damaska played in 1,902 games during a 17-year-long minor league playing career but his five appearances for the Cardinals all occurred in July of 1963. He took the field only twice, once at second base and once in the outfield; in four innings on defense, he recorded no chances. He had a total of five at bats, with four strikeouts and one hit, a pinch single off Denny Lemaster of the Milwaukee Braves on July 11 in the first game of a doubleheader. His hit, however, sparked a five-run seventh-inning rally to enable the Cardinals to defeat the Braves, 6–3. He notched his only MLB run scored and run batted in during that rally.

As late as 1973, Damaska was playing for the Québec Carnavals of the Double-A Eastern League. He spent one year as a minor league manager in 1974 for the Kinston Expos of the Class-A Carolina League, a Montreal affiliate that folded at the end of its only season of play.

When a member of the International League All-Stars against the Milwaukee Braves in 1965, Damaska went three-for-four at the plate, drove in two runs and scored another to lead the All-Stars to a 6–2 upset win over the MLB Braves.
