= Richmond Virginians =

- 1954–1964; Richmond, Virginia

Team logo	Cap insignia

Minor league affiliations
- Class: Triple-A (1954–1964)
- League: International League (1954–1964)

Major league affiliations
- Team: New York Yankees (1956–1964)

Team data
- Ballpark: Parker Field
- Manager: Luke Appling (1954–1955); Eddie Lopat (1956–1958); Steve Souchock (1959–1960); Cal Ermer (1961); Sheriff Robinson (1962); Preston Gómez (1963–1964)

The Richmond Virginians was the name of a minor league baseball franchise that played in Richmond, Virginia, from 1954 through 1964. The team competed at the Triple-A level as members of the International League, and were affiliated with the New York Yankees for nine of their 11 seasons.

== History ==
The minor-league Virginians were the transplanted version of the International League edition of the Baltimore Orioles, who were uprooted from their Maryland home when the St. Louis Browns of Major League Baseball transferred there for the 1954 season. (The 1954 transfer was the second time the Orioles had moved to the Virginia capital. The Orioles played there during 1915–1917 when the Federal League, the outlaw "third major league", chased them temporarily from Baltimore.)

The Virginians were unaffiliated with a major league farm system during 1954 and 1955, and—despite being managed by a Hall of Famer, Luke Appling—they wallowed at the bottom of league standings. The team's fortunes improved in 1956, when it affiliated with the New York Yankees. The Virginians, the Yankees' sole Triple-A farm club after 1958, sent several key players (including Tom Tresh, Al Downing and Joe Pepitone) to the major league team, but the club's attendance figures were usually in the bottom tier of the league.

At one point, the Virginians were the only minor league affiliate of the Yankees allowed to keep their nickname instead of adopting the Yankees name. For instance, the Columbus Confederate Yankees, based in Columbus, Georgia, were forced to adopt the "Yankees" name, but made use of the Confederate flag on its uniforms.

After the 1964 season, the Virginians were transferred to Toledo, Ohio, and were renamed as the Toledo Mud Hens.

Richmond was without baseball in 1965, but gained its longtime IL franchise, the Richmond Braves, when the Atlanta Crackers transferred there the following season. After 43 seasons in Richmond, the club moved to Gwinnett County, Georgia, for the 2009 campaign. In 2010, Virginia's capital joined the Double-A Eastern League with the creation of the Richmond Flying Squirrels—formerly the Connecticut Defenders of Norwich, Connecticut—an affiliate of the San Francisco Giants.
