= List of International League champions =

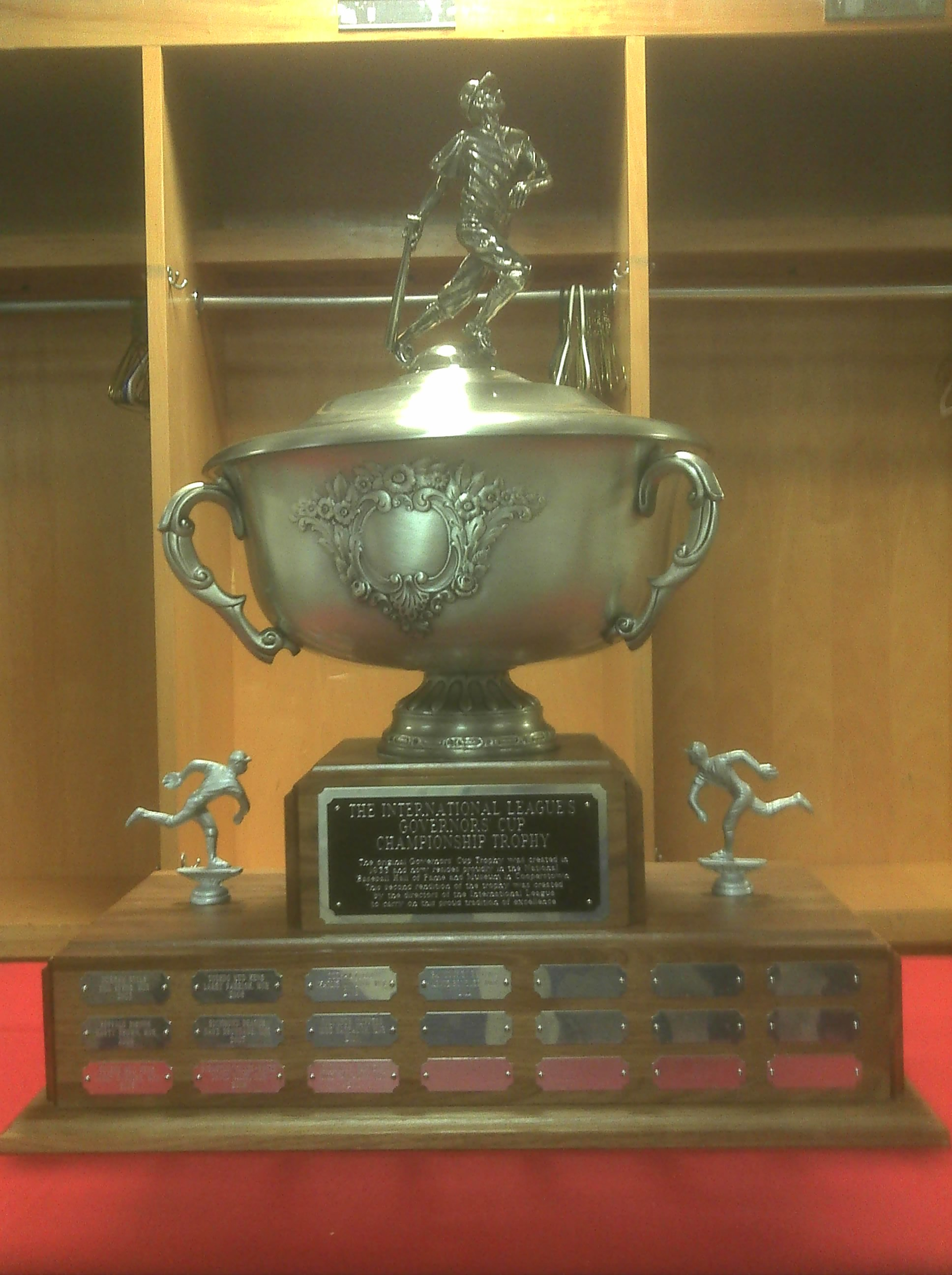
The Governors' Cup, awarded to winners of the International League playoffs from 1933 to 2020

The International League (IL) is a Minor League Baseball league that operates in the United States at the Triple-A level, which is one grade below Major League Baseball. A champion has been determined at the end of each season since the league was formed in 1884.

Through 1932, champions were usually the regular-season pennant winners—the team with the best win–loss record at the conclusion of the season. From 1933 to 2020, postseason playoffs were held to determine champions. Participants from 1933 to 1987 were usually the four teams with the highest winning percentages. From 1988 to 2020, the four qualifiers were the division winners and one or two wild card teams. The winner of each season's playoffs was awarded the Governors' Cup. These playoffs and the issuing of trophy were discontinued in 2021, when the winner was the team with the best regular-season record. In 2022, the league championship was determined by a single playoff game between the East and West division winners. Beginning with the 2023 season, the league adopted a split season format, in which the league championship is determined by a best-of-three playoff series between the winners of each half of the season, with the winner meeting the champion of the Pacific Coast League in the Triple-A National Championship Game.

The Rochester Red Wings have won 20 International League championships, more than any other team, followed by the Columbus Clippers (11) and the Baltimore Orioles, original Buffalo Bisons, and Toronto Maple Leafs (10). Among active IL franchises, Rochester has won 20 championships, the most of all teams, followed by Columbus (11) and the Durham Bulls and Syracuse Mets (8). During the era of the Governors' Cup playoffs from 1933 to 2020, the most cup titles were won by Columbus (11), followed by Rochester (10) and Syracuse (8).

== History ==
=== Pre-playoff era (1884–1932) ===
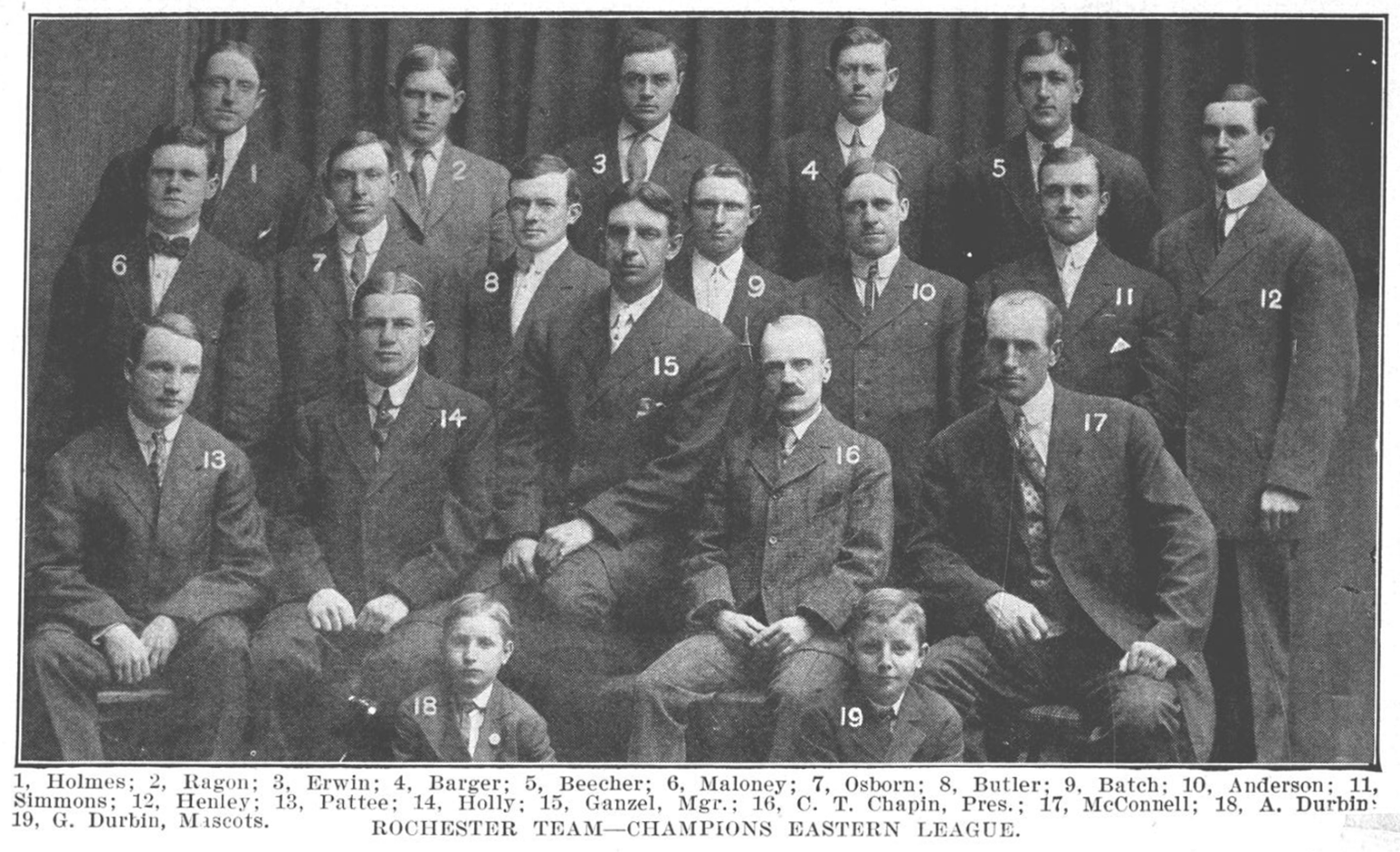
The Rochester Red Wings, known as the Hustlers in 1909, won nine championships during the pre-playoff era (1884–1932), more than any other team.

The International League was founded in 1884. The modern circuit traces its roots from several predecessor leagues: the Eastern League (1884), New York State League (1885), International League (1886–1887), International Association (1888–1890), Eastern Association (1891), and Eastern League (1892–1911). It adopted consistent use of the International League name in 1912. After the cancellation of the 2020 season due to the COVID-19 pandemic, the league was known as the Triple-A East in 2021 before reverting to the International League moniker in 2022.

A league champion has been determined at the end of each season. With few exceptions, champions from 1884 to 1932 were simply the regular-season pennant winners—the team with the best win–loss record at the conclusion of the regular championship season. The first league champions were the Trenton Trentonians, who won by four games over the Lancaster Ironsides in 1884. The 1891 and 1892 seasons were contested as split seasons or "double seasons". Under this format, the schedule was split into two parts. The team with the best record at the end of the first season won the first pennant. Standings were then reset so that all clubs had clean records to begin the second season. If the same team won both seasons, they were declared the league champion. This was the case in 1891 when the original Buffalo Bisons won both halves. If a different team won the second season, the two winners would meet in a playoff series to determine the champion. This happened in 1892 when the Binghamton Bingoes, winners of the second season, defeated the Providence Clamdiggers, winners of the first season, four games to two. In 1932, the Newark Bears became the last team to win the championship by virtue of winning the regular-season pennant before a recurring series of playoffs were instituted.

=== Governors' Cup era (1933–2020) ===
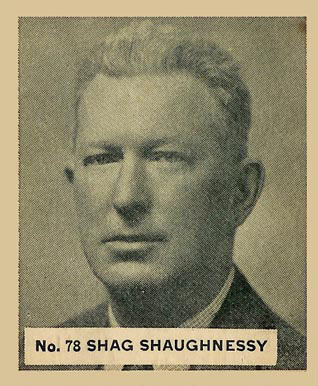
Frank Shaughnessy devised a playoff system that was used for the Governor's Cup playoffs to determine a league champion.

Frank Shaughnessy, general manager of the International League's Montreal Royals, was interested in developing a way for multiple clubs to share in the excitement of postseason play. His new playoff format, devised to maintain the interest of fans and players alike during the Great Depression, provided an opportunity for four teams to compete for the league's championship. In 1933, he introduced his plan to league president Charles H. Knappe, and the result was the Governors' Cup playoffs. Several other leagues noticed the success of the "Shaughnessy Plan" and began using the system as well.

The governors of Maryland, New Jersey, and New York and the lieutenant governors of the provinces of Quebec and Ontario, in which the league's eight teams were located at the time, sponsored a trophy to be awarded annually to the winner of the International League playoffs. The original trophy, designed by the supervisor of the league's umpires and silversmith W. B. Carpenter, was created out of solid silver. In 1988, IL president Harold Cooper donated the trophy to the Baseball Hall of Fame in Cooperstown, New York, where it is on permanent display. A new trophy was minted in its place to be presented to the winner of the Governors' Cup playoffs.

Under this system, the top four teams in the league, based on winning percentage, competed for the championship. From 1933 to 1987, the first round typically consisted of a best-of-seven-games series between the first and fourth-place teams and a series between the second and third-place teams. The winners of these semifinals then faced one another for the championship in a best-of-seven series. The first Governors' Cup was won in 1933 by the original Buffalo Bisons, who defeated the Rochester Red Wings, 4–2. Sporadically from 1966 to 1980, one or both rounds were reduced to best-of-five series. From 1981 to 2020, both rounds were the best-of-five.

The IL utilized a divisional alignment for the first time in 1963. The first-place teams from each division, North and South, met in the first round, as did the second-place teams, with the winners meeting in the finals. The circuit reverted to having no divisions in 1964 but returned to the same playoff format with North and South Divisions for 1973 and 1974.

From 1988 to 1991, the International League held an interleague partnership with the American Association, called the Triple-A Alliance, in which they played an interlocking schedule, and the leagues' champions met in the Triple-A Classic. During this period, the IL was divided into East and West Divisions, and the division winners faced off in a best-of-five series to determine champions. After the dissolution of the Triple-A Alliance following the 1991 season, the International League maintained this divisional alignment but returned to having a semifinal round wherein the top two teams in each division played each other to qualify for the Governors' Cup finals.

The league was split into three divisions, North, South, and West, from 1998 to 2020. Under this arrangement, the three division winners and a wild card team, the team with the best second-place record, qualified for the playoffs. The best-of-five semifinals pitted the North Division winner against the wild card team, and the South and West Division winners against each other. The winners then played in a best-of-five round to determine the champion. The last team to win the championship this way was the Columbus Clippers, who won the last Governors' Cup in 2019. The 2020 season was canceled due to the COVID-19 pandemic.

=== Current era (2021–present) ===
The International League ceased operations before the 2021 season in conjunction with Major League Baseball's (MLB) reorganization of Minor League Baseball. In place of the International League, MLB created the Triple-A East, a circuit divided into three divisions, Northeast, Midwest, and Southeast. Prior to the 2022 season, MLB renamed the Triple-A East the International League, and it carried on the history of the IL prior to reorganization. Rather than hold playoffs for its championship, the Triple-A East's 2021 title was awarded to the team with the best regular-season record. The Durham Bulls won this championship by four-and-a-half games ahead of the Buffalo Bisons.

Along with these changes, all references to the Governors' Cup as the championship of the International League were discontinued and a different trophy was awarded. In 2022, the league was reorganized in East and West Divisions. Under this alignment, the winners of each division met in a single game to determine the league champion.

Beginning in 2023, the regular-season was split into two halves, and the winners of each half meet in a best-of-three series for the league championship.

== Champions ==
=== Pre-playoff champions (1884–1932) ===
Key
Record	Regular-season win–loss record
GA	Games ahead of the second-place team

Champions
Year	Champion	Record	GA	Runner-up	Ref.
1884	Trenton Trentonians	46–39	4	Lancaster Ironsides	
1885	Syracuse Stars	52–37	3 1/2	Utica Pent-Ups	
1886	Utica Pent-Ups	62–34	5 1/2	Rochester Maroons	
1887	Toronto Canucks	65–36	3	Buffalo Bisons	
1888	Syracuse Stars	81–30	5 1/2	Toronto Canucks	
1889	Detroit Wolverines	72–39	6 1/2	Syracuse Stars	
1890	Detroit Wolverines (Note: The league disbanded on July 9. Of the teams remaining in the league at the time, Detroit was in first place, making them the de facto champions.)	31–19	1	Toronto Canucks	
1891	Buffalo Bisons	— (Note: The 1891 season was contested as a double season. Buffalo won the championship by virtue of having won both halves.)	—	—	
1892	Binghamton Bingoes	— (Note: The 1892 season was contested as a double season. Providence won the first half, and Binghamton won the second. In the championship series, Binghamton defeated Providence, 4–2.)	—	Providence Clamdiggers	
1893	Erie Blackbirds	63–41	1	Springfield Ponies	
1894	Providence Grays	78–34	18	Erie Blackbirds	
1895	Springfield Maroons	79–36	6 1/2	Providence Grays	
1896	Providence Grays	71–47	3 1/2	Buffalo Bisons	
1897	Syracuse Stars	83–50	3 1/2	Toronto Maple Leafs	
1898	Montreal Royals	68–48	3	Wilkes-Barre Coal Barons	
1899	Rochester Bronchos	72–43	9	Montreal Royals	
1900	Providence Clamdiggers	84–52	5 1/2	Rochester Bronchos	
1901	Rochester Bronchos	89–49	9	Toronto Maple Leafs	
1902	Toronto Maple Leafs	85–42	— (Note: Toronto won the championship with a winning percentage of .669 (85–42) versus Buffalo's .662 (88–45).)	Buffalo Bisons	
1903	Jersey City Skeeters	92–33	11 1/2	Buffalo Bisons	
1904	Buffalo Bisons	88–46	8	Baltimore Orioles	
1905	Providence Clamdiggers	83–47	1/2	Baltimore Orioles	
1906	Buffalo Bisons	85–55	3 1/2	Jersey City Skeeters	
1907	Toronto Maple Leafs	83–51	9	Buffalo Bisons	
1908	Baltimore Orioles	83–57	2	Providence Grays	
1909	Rochester Hustlers	90–61	5	Newark Indians	
1910	Rochester Bronchos	92–61	4 1/2	Newark Indians	
1911	Rochester Hustlers	98–54	3 1/2	Baltimore Orioles	
1912	Toronto Maple Leafs	91–62	5	Rochester Hustlers	
1913	Newark Indians	95–57	4	Rochester Hustlers	
1914	Providence Grays	95–59	5 1/2	Buffalo Bisons	
1915	Buffalo Bisons	86–50	2	Providence Grays	
1916	Buffalo Bisons	82–58	5	Providence Grays	
1917	Toronto Maple Leafs	93–61	1 1/2	Providence Grays	
1918	Toronto Maple Leafs	88–39	1	Binghamton Bingoes	
1919	Baltimore Orioles	100–49	8	Toronto Maple Leafs	
1920	Baltimore Orioles	110–43	2 1/2	Toronto Maple Leafs	
1921	Baltimore Orioles	119–47	20	Rochester Colts	
1922	Baltimore Orioles	115–52	10	Rochester Tribe	
1923	Baltimore Orioles	111–53	11	Rochester Tribe	
1924	Baltimore Orioles	117–48	19	Toronto Maple Leafs	
1925	Baltimore Orioles	105–61	4	Toronto Maple Leafs	
1926	Toronto Maple Leafs	109–57	8	Baltimore Orioles	
1927	Buffalo Bisons	112–56	10	Syracuse Stars	
1928	Rochester Red Wings	90–74	— (Note: Rochester won the championship with a winning percentage of .549 (90–74) versus Buffalo's .548 (92–76).)	Buffalo Bisons	
1929	Rochester Red Wings	103–65	11	Toronto Maple Leafs	
1930	Rochester Red Wings	105–62	8	Baltimore Orioles	
1931	Rochester Red Wings	101–67	2	Newark Bears	
1932	Newark Bears	109–59	15 1/2	Baltimore Orioles	

=== Governors' Cup champions (1933–2020) ===
Key
Score	Score of the Governors' Cup championship series
P	Regular-season pennant winner (1933–1962, 1964–1972, 1975–1987)
N	North Division winner (1963, 1973–1974, 1998–2020)
S	South Division winner (1963, 1973–1974, 1998–2020)
E	East Division winner (1988–1997)
W	West Division winner (1988–2020)

Champions
Year	Champion	Score	Runner-up	Other playoff teams	Ref.
1933	Buffalo Bisons	4–2	Rochester Red Wings	Baltimore Orioles & Newark Bears^{P}	
1934	Toronto Maple Leafs	4–1	Rochester Red Wings	Albany Senators & Newark Bears^{P}	
1935	Syracuse Chiefs	4–3	Montreal Royals^{P}	Buffalo Bisons & Newark Bears	
1936	Buffalo Bisons^{P}	4–2	Baltimore Orioles	Newark Bears & Rochester Red Wings	
1937	Newark Bears^{P}	4–0	Baltimore Orioles	Montreal Royals & Syracuse Chiefs	
1938	Newark Bears^{P}	4–1	Buffalo Bisons	Rochester Red Wings & Syracuse Chiefs	
1939	Rochester Red Wings	4–3	Newark Bears	Buffalo Bisons & Jersey City Giants^{P}	
1940	Newark Bears	4–3	Baltimore Orioles	Jersey City Giants & Rochester Red Wings^{P}	
1941	Montreal Royals	4–3	Newark Bears^{P}	Buffalo Bisons & Rochester Red Wings	
1942	Syracuse Chiefs	4–0	Jersey City Giants	Montreal Royals & Newark Bears^{P}	
1943	Syracuse Chiefs	4–2	Toronto Maple Leafs^{P}	Montreal Royals & Newark Bears	
1944	Baltimore Orioles^{P}	4–3	Newark Bears	Buffalo Bisons & Toronto Maple Leafs	
1945	Newark Bears	4–3	Montreal Royals^{P}	Baltimore Orioles & Toronto Maple Leafs	
1946	Montreal Royals^{P}	4–1	Syracuse Chiefs	Baltimore Orioles & Newark Bears	
1947	Syracuse Chiefs	4–3	Buffalo Bisons	Jersey City Giants^{P} & Montreal Royals	
1948	Montreal Royals^{P}	4–1	Syracuse Chiefs	Newark Bears & Rochester Red Wings	
1949	Montreal Royals^{P}	4–1	Buffalo Bisons	Jersey City Giants & Rochester Red Wings	
1950	Baltimore Orioles	4–2	Rochester Red Wings^{P}	Jersey City Giants & Montreal Royals	
1951	Montreal Royals^{P}	4–1	Syracuse Chiefs	Buffalo Bisons & Rochester Red Wings	
1952	Rochester Red Wings	4–2	Montreal Royals^{P}	Syracuse Chiefs & Toronto Maple Leafs	
1953	Montreal Royals	4–0	Rochester Red Wings^{P}	Baltimore Orioles & Buffalo Bisons	
1954	Syracuse Chiefs	4–3	Montreal Royals	Rochester Red Wings & Toronto Maple Leafs^{P}	
1955	Rochester Red Wings	4–0	Toronto Maple Leafs	Havana Sugar Kings & Montreal Royals^{P}	
1956	Rochester Red Wings	4–3	Toronto Maple Leafs^{P}	Miami Marlins & Montreal Royals	
1957	Buffalo Bisons	4–1	Miami Marlins	Richmond Virginians & Toronto Maple Leafs^{P}	
1958	Montreal Royals^{P}	4–1	Toronto Maple Leafs	Columbus Jets & Rochester Red Wings	
1959	Havana Sugar Kings	4–2	Richmond Virginians	Buffalo Bisons^{P} & Columbus Jets	
1960	Toronto Maple Leafs^{P}	4–1	Rochester Red Wings	Buffalo Bisons & Richmond Virginians	
1961	Buffalo Bisons	4–1	Rochester Red Wings	Charleston Marlins & Columbus Jets^{P}	
1962	Atlanta Crackers	4–3	Jacksonville Suns^{P}	Rochester Red Wings & Toronto Maple Leafs	
1963	Indianapolis Indians^{S}	4–2	Atlanta Crackers	Syracuse Chiefs^{N} & Toronto Maple Leafs	
1964	Rochester Red Wings	4–2	Syracuse Chiefs	Buffalo Bisons & Jacksonville Suns^{P}	
1965	Toronto Maple Leafs	4–1	Columbus Jets^{P}	Atlanta Crackers & Syracuse Chiefs	
1966	Toronto Maple Leafs	4–1	Richmond Braves	Columbus Jets & Rochester Red Wings^{P}	
1967	Toledo Mud Hens	4–1	Columbus Jets	Richmond Braves^{P} & Rochester Red Wings	
1968	Jacksonville Suns	4–0	Columbus Jets	Rochester Red Wings & Toledo Mud Hens^{P}	
1969	Syracuse Chiefs	4–1	Columbus Jets	Louisville Colonels & Tidewater Tides^{P}	
1970	Syracuse Chiefs^{P}	3–1	Columbus Jets	Rochester Red Wings & Tidewater Tides	
1971	Rochester Red Wings^{P}	3–2	Tidewater Tides	Charleston Charlies & Syracuse Chiefs	
1972	Tidewater Tides	3–2	Louisville Colonels^{P}	Charleston Charlies & Rochester Red Wings	
1973	Pawtucket Red Sox	3–2	Charleston Charlies^{S}	Rochester Red Wings^{N} & Tidewater Tides	
1974	Rochester Red Wings^{N}	4–3	Syracuse Chiefs	Memphis Blues^{S} & Richmond Braves	
1975	Tidewater Tides^{P}	3–1	Syracuse Chiefs	Charleston Charlies & Rochester Red Wings	
1976	Syracuse Chiefs	3–1	Richmond Braves	Memphis Blues & Rochester Red Wings^{P}	
1977	Charleston Charlies	4–0	Pawtucket Red Sox^{P}	Richmond Braves & Tidewater Tides	
1978	Richmond Braves	4–3	Pawtucket Red Sox	Charleston Charlies^{P} & Toledo Mud Hens	
1979	Columbus Clippers^{P}	4–3	Syracuse Chiefs	Richmond Braves & Tidewater Tides	
1980	Columbus Clippers^{P}	4–1	Toledo Mud Hens	Richmond Braves & Rochester Red Wings	
1981	Columbus Clippers^{P}	2–1 (Note: Columbus, with a 2–1 series lead, was declared the champion after the playoffs were canceled due to rain and unplayable field conditions.)	Richmond Braves	Rochester Red Wings & Tidewater Tides	
1982	Tidewater Tides	3–0	Rochester Red Wings	Columbus Clippers & Richmond Braves^{P}	
1983	Tidewater Tides	3–1	Richmond Braves	Charleston Charlies & Columbus Clippers^{P}	
1984	Pawtucket Red Sox	3–2	Maine Guides	Columbus Clippers^{P} & Toledo Mud Hens	
1985	Tidewater Tides	3–1	Columbus Clippers	Maine Guides & Syracuse Chiefs^{P}	
1986	Richmond Braves^{P}	3–2	Rochester Red Wings	Pawtucket Red Sox & Tidewater Tides	
1987	Columbus Clippers	3–0	Tidewater Tides^{P}	Pawtucket Red Sox & Rochester Red Wings	
1988	Rochester Red Wings^{W}	3–1	Tidewater Tides^{E}	—	
1989	Richmond Braves^{W}	3–1	Syracuse Chiefs^{E}	—	
1990	Rochester Red Wings^{E}	3–2	Columbus Clippers^{W}	—	
1991	Columbus Clippers^{W}	3–0	Pawtucket Red Sox^{E}	—	
1992	Columbus Clippers^{W}	3–2	Scranton/Wilkes-Barre Red Barons^{E}	Pawtucket Red Sox & Richmond Braves	
1993	Charlotte Knights^{W}	3–2	Rochester Red Wings^{E}	Ottawa Lynx & Richmond Braves	
1994	Richmond Braves^{W}	3–0	Syracuse Chiefs	Charlotte Knights & Pawtucket Red Sox^{E}	
1995	Ottawa Lynx	3–1	Norfolk Tides^{W}	Richmond Braves & Rochester Red Wings^{E}	
1996	Columbus Clippers^{W}	3–0	Rochester Red Wings	Norfolk Tides & Pawtucket Red Sox^{E}	
1997	Rochester Red Wings^{E}	3–2	Columbus Clippers^{W}	Charlotte Knights & Pawtucket Red Sox	
1998	Buffalo Bisons^{N}	3–2	Durham Bulls^{S}	Louisville Redbirds^{W} & Syracuse SkyChiefs	
1999	Charlotte Knights	3–1	Durham Bulls^{S}	Columbus Clippers^{W} & Scranton/Wilkes-Barre Red Barons^{N}	
2000	Indianapolis Indians^{W}	3–2	Scranton/Wilkes-Barre Red Barons	Buffalo Bisons^{N} & Durham Bulls^{S}	
2001	Louisville RiverBats^{W}	1–0 (Note: Louisville, with a 1–0 series lead, was declared the champion after the playoffs were canceled in the wake of the September 11 terrorist attacks.)	Scranton/Wilkes-Barre Red Barons	Buffalo Bisons^{N} & Norfolk Tides^{S}	
2002	Durham Bulls^{S}	3–0	Buffalo Bisons	Scranton/Wilkes-Barre Red Barons^{N} & Toledo Mud Hens^{W}	
2003	Durham Bulls^{S}	3–0	Pawtucket Red Sox^{N}	Louisville Bats^{W} & Ottawa Lynx	
2004	Buffalo Bisons^{N}	3–1	Richmond Braves^{S}	Columbus Clippers^{W} & Durham Bulls	
2005	Toledo Mud Hens^{W}	3–0	Indianapolis Indians	Buffalo Bisons^{N} & Norfolk Tides^{S}	
2006	Toledo Mud Hens^{W}	3–2	Rochester Red Wings	Charlotte Knights^{S} & Scranton/Wilkes-Barre Red Barons^{N}	
2007	Richmond Braves	3–2	Durham Bulls^{S}	Scranton/Wilkes-Barre Yankees^{N} & Toledo Mud Hens^{W}	
2008	Scranton/Wilkes-Barre Yankees^{N}	3–1	Durham Bulls^{S}	Louisville Bats^{W} & Pawtucket Red Sox	
2009	Durham Bulls^{S}	3–0	Scranton/Wilkes-Barre Yankees^{N}	Gwinnett Braves & Louisville Bats^{N}	
2010	Columbus Clippers	3–1	Durham Bulls^{S}	Louisville Bats^{W} & Scranton/Wilkes-Barre Yankees^{N}	
2011	Columbus Clippers^{W}	3–1	Lehigh Valley IronPigs	Durham Bulls^{S} & Pawtucket Red Sox^{N}	
2012	Pawtucket Red Sox	3–0	Charlotte Knights^{S}	Indianapolis Indians^{W} & Scranton/Wilkes-Barre Yankees^{N}	
2013	Durham Bulls^{S}	3–1	Pawtucket Red Sox^{N}	Indianapolis Indians^{W} & Rochester Red Wings	
2014	Pawtucket Red Sox	3–2	Durham Bulls^{S}	Columbus Clippers^{W} & Syracuse Chiefs^{N}	
2015	Columbus Clippers^{W}	3–2	Indianapolis Indians	Norfolk Tides^{S} & Scranton/Wilkes-Barre RailRiders^{N}	
2016	Scranton/Wilkes-Barre RailRiders^{N}	3–1	Gwinnett Braves^{S}	Columbus Clippers^{W} & Lehigh Valley IronPigs	
2017	Durham Bulls^{S}	3–1	Scranton/Wilkes-Barre RailRiders^{N}	Indianapolis Indians^{W} & Lehigh Valley IronPigs	
2018	Durham Bulls^{S}	3–2	Scranton/Wilkes-Barre RailRiders	Lehigh Valley IronPigs^{N} & Toledo Mud Hens^{W}	
2019	Columbus Clippers^{W}	3–0	Durham Bulls	Gwinnett Stripers^{S} & Scranton/Wilkes-Barre RailRiders^{N}	
2020	None (season canceled due to COVID-19 pandemic)				

=== 2021–present ===
Key
Score	Score of the championship series

Champions
Year	Champion	Score	Runner-up	Ref.
2021	Durham Bulls	— (Note: No playoffs were held. Durham won the championship by virtue of having the league's best regular-season record (77–43). They finished 4 1/2 games ahead of Buffalo.)	Buffalo Bisons	
2022	Durham Bulls	1–0	Nashville Sounds	
2023	Norfolk Tides	2–1	Durham Bulls	
2024	Omaha Storm Chasers	2–1	Columbus Clippers	
2025	Jacksonville Jumbo Shrimp	2–1	Scranton/Wilkes-Barre RailRiders	
2026	Rochester Red Wings	2–1	Memphis Redbirds	

== Wins by team ==
Active International League teams appear in bold.

Team	Wins	Year(s)
**Rochester Red Wings** (Rochester Bronchos/Hustlers)	20	1899, 1901, 1909, 1910, 1911, 1928, 1929, 1930, 1931, 1939, 1952, 1955, 1956, 1964, 1971, 1974, 1988, 1990, 1997, 2026
**Columbus Clippers**	11	1979, 1980, 1981, 1987, 1991, 1992, 1996, 2010, 2011, 2015, 2019
Baltimore Orioles	10	1908, 1919, 1920, 1921, 1922, 1923, 1924, 1925, 1944, 1950
Buffalo Bisons (1886–1970)	10	1891, 1904, 1906, 1915, 1916, 1927, 1933, 1936, 1957, 1961
Toronto Maple Leafs	10	1902, 1907, 1912, 1917, 1918, 1926, 1934, 1960, 1965, 1966
**Durham Bulls**	8	2002, 2003, 2009, 2013, 2017, 2018, 2021, 2022
Montreal Royals	8	1898, 1941, 1946, 1948, 1949, 1951, 1953, 1958
**Syracuse Mets** (Syracuse Chiefs)	8	1935, 1942, 1943, 1947, 1954, 1969, 1970, 1976
**Norfolk Tides** (Tidewater Tides)	6	1972, 1975, 1982, 1983, 1985, 2023
Newark Bears	5	1932, 1937, 1938, 1940, 1945
Providence Grays (Providence Clamdiggers)	5	1894, 1896, 1900, 1905, 1914
Richmond Braves	5	1978, 1986, 1989, 1994, 2007
Pawtucket Red Sox	4	1973, 1984, 2012, 2014
Syracuse Stars	3	1885, 1888, 1897
**Toledo Mud Hens**	3	1967, 2005, 2006
**Buffalo Bisons** (1979–present)	2	1998, 2004
**Charlotte Knights**	2	1993, 1999
Detroit Wolverines	2	1889, 1890
**Indianapolis Indians**	2	1963, 2000
**Jacksonville Jumbo Shrimp** (Jacksonville Suns)	2	1968, 2025
**Scranton/Wilkes-Barre Highlanders** (Scranton/Wilkes-Barre Yankees/RailRiders)	2	2008, 2016
Atlanta Crackers	1	1962
Binghamton Bingoes	1	1892
Charleston Charlies	1	1977
Erie Blackbirds	1	1893
Havana Sugar Kings	1	1959
Jersey City Skeeters	1	1903
**Louisville Bats** (Louisville RiverBats)	1	2001
Newark Indians	1	1913
**Omaha Storm Chasers**	1	2024
Ottawa Lynx	1	1995
Springfield Maroons	1	1895
Toronto Canucks	1	1887
Trenton Trentonians	1	1884
Utica Pent-Ups	1	1886

=== Governors' Cup wins by team ===
Team	Governors' Cup wins	Year(s)
Columbus Clippers	11	1979, 1980, 1981, 1987, 1991, 1992, 1996, 2010, 2011, 2015, 2019
Rochester Red Wings	10	1939, 1952, 1955, 1956, 1964, 1971, 1974, 1988, 1990, 1997
Syracuse Mets (Syracuse Chiefs)	8	1935, 1942, 1943, 1947, 1954, 1969, 1970, 1976
Montreal Royals	7	1941, 1946, 1948, 1949, 1951, 1953, 1958
Durham Bulls	6	2002, 2003, 2009, 2013, 2017, 2018
Norfolk Tides (Tidewater Tides)	5	1972, 1975, 1982, 1983, 1985
Richmond Braves	5	1978, 1986, 1989, 1994, 2007
Buffalo Bisons (1886–1970)	4	1933, 1936, 1957, 1961
Newark Bears	4	1937, 1938, 1940, 1945
Pawtucket Red Sox	4	1973, 1984, 2012, 2014
Toronto Maple Leafs	4	1934, 1960, 1965, 1966
Toledo Mud Hens	3	1967, 2005, 2006
Baltimore Orioles	2	1944, 1950
Buffalo Bisons (1979–present)	2	1998, 2004
Charlotte Knights	2	1993, 1999
Indianapolis Indians	2	1963, 2000
Scranton/Wilkes-Barre Highlanders (Scranton/Wilkes-Barre Yankees/RailRiders)	2	2008, 2016
Atlanta Crackers	1	1962
Charleston Charlies	1	1977
Havana Sugar Kings	1	1959
Jacksonville Jumbo Shrimp (Jacksonville Suns)	1	1968
Louisville Bats (Louisville RiverBats)	1	2001
Ottawa Lynx	1	1995

== See also ==
- List of American Association champions
- List of Pacific Coast League champions
