= Parker Field (Richmond) =

Multi-use outdoor stadium in Virginia, USA

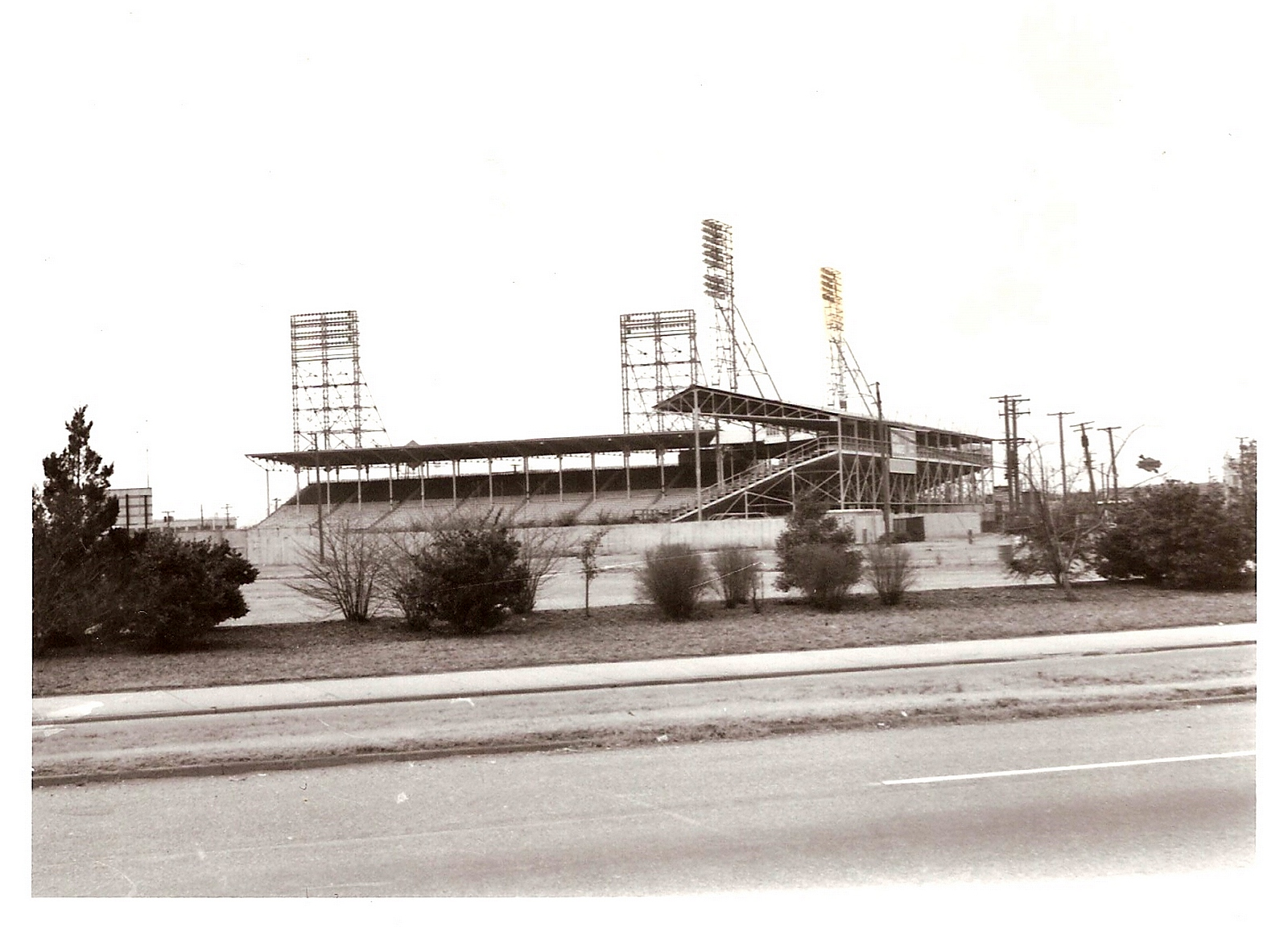
- Parker Field in 1976
- Interactive map of Parker Field
- Full name: William H. Parker Field
- Location: 3001 N. Boulevard; Richmond, Virginia
- Coordinates: 37°34′18.5″N 77°27′49.4″W
- Capacity: 9,500

Construction
- Opened: 1934
- Renovated: 1954
- Closed: 1984
- Demolished: 1984

Tenants
- Richmond Virginians (1954-1964); Richmond Braves (1966-1984)

Parker Field was a multi-use outdoor stadium in Richmond, Virginia, with a seating capacity of 9,500. The field was built in 1934, as part of the fair grounds, and was named after William H. Parker, who helped with the construction of the field. It was converted for minor league baseball in 1954, replacing Mooers Field.

== Richmond Virginians ==
Parker Field was the home field of the Richmond Virginians (1954–64) of the Class AAA International League. The team was moved south from Baltimore, which gained a major league team in 1954 when the St. Louis Browns moved east. Unaffiliated for the first two seasons, the Virginians became a farm club of the New York Yankees in 1956. Following the 1964 season, the team relocated northwest to Toledo, Ohio, to become the Mud Hens.

== Richmond Braves ==
After an idle year in 1965, the International League returned with the Richmond Braves, who occupied the stadium for its final 19 seasons (1966–84). The team was previously the Atlanta Crackers, the AAA affiliate of the Milwaukee Braves. When the major league team moved south to Atlanta in 1966, the farm team moved north to become the Richmond Braves. Parker Field was demolished after the 1984 season and replaced by The Diamond in 1985. After 24 seasons at The Diamond and 43 years in Richmond, the Richmond Braves relocated back to Georgia following the 2008 season and became the Gwinnett Braves.
