= MacArthur Stadium =

Stadium in Syracuse, New York

- Big Mac
- Interactive map of MacArthur Stadium
- Former names: Municipal Stadium (1934–1942)
- Location: 820 Second North Street, Syracuse, NY
- Coordinates: 43.076657°N 76.162959°W
- Owner: City of Syracuse; transferred to County of Onondaga in mid 1970s
- Operator: City of Syracuse; County of Onondaga operated effective mid 1970s
- Capacity: 8,416 (1934–1941); 10,006 (1942–1984); 10,500 (1985–1996)
- Surface: Grass
- Field size: Left field: 320 feet (98 m); Center field: 434 feet (132 m); Right field: 320 feet (98 m)

Construction
- Groundbreaking: March 1, 1934
- Opened: April 18, 1934
- Renovated: 1976 and 1988
- Closed: September 3, 1996
- Demolished: 1997
- Cost: $284,000 ($6.84 million in 2025 dollars)

Tenants
- Syracuse Chiefs (MiLB) (1934–1996); Syracuse Braves (AFL II) (1936)

MacArthur Stadium was a stadium in Syracuse, New York. Opened in 1934 as Municipal Stadium, it was used primarily for baseball and was the home of Syracuse Chiefs before they moved to P&C Stadium, (now NBT Bank Stadium) in 1997. The ballpark had an initial capacity of 8,416 people; its capacity was increased to 10,006 before it was renamed in honor of General Douglas MacArthur in 1942. The stadium was razed in 1997 to provide a parking lot for the newly built P&C Stadium (now named NBT Bank Stadium).

== Center field ==
MacArthur Stadium was noted for having one of the deepest center field fences in minor league baseball, at 434 feet (132 m), and no ball had ever cleared that high wall until 1971, with Richie Zisk becoming the first batter to accomplish that feat while playing with the Charleston Charlies.

== Football ==
In 1936, Municipal Stadium was the home field of the Syracuse Braves of the American Football League.

== Fire ==
MacArthur Stadium was severely damaged by a spectacular fire (arson) on May 14, 1969, where the center portion of the grandstand, the main entrance, press box, offices and concession area all burned, while portions of the seating overlooking left and right field were saved. The Chiefs were forced to play some home games in Oneonta and Auburn, NY, while repairs were being made, returning to the stadium on June 14 to a now wide-open gap behind home plate where the grandstand had been. (Management of the Rochester Red Wings rejected an urgent plea from Syracuse team management to move some home games to Silver Stadium). Months later it was discovered the fire had been started by some teenagers who were using a flare in an attempt to burn their way into a safe.

== See also ==
- Newell Park
- Star Park
