= Silver Stadium =

Baseball stadium in Rochester, New York

- "The Taj Mahal" "Wrigley Field of Rochester"
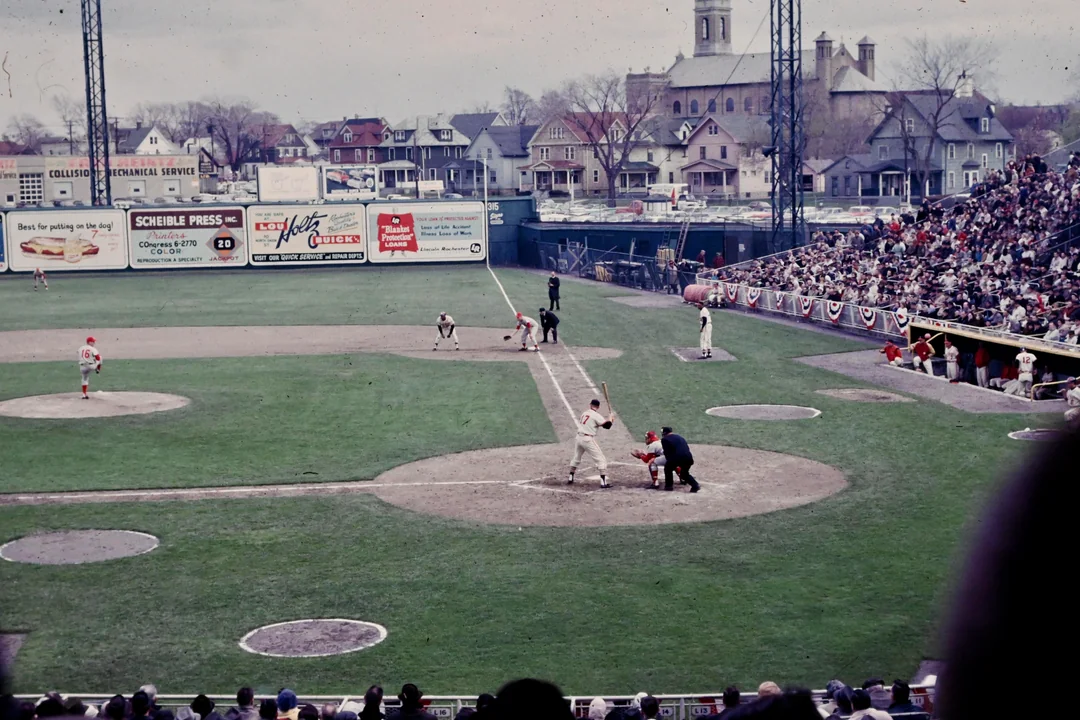
- Silver Stadium, then Red Wings Stadium, in 1963
- Interactive map of Silver Stadium
- Former names: Red Wing Stadium (1929–1968)
- Location: 500 Norton Street; Rochester, NY 14621
- Coordinates: 43.18755°N 77.61099°W
- Owner: Rochester Community Baseball, Inc.
- Operator: Rochester Community Baseball, Inc.
- Capacity: 15,000 (1929–1987); 12,503 (1987–1994); 11,502 (1995–1996)
- Surface: Grass
- Field size: Left field: 320 feet (98 m); Center field: 420 feet (130 m); Right field: 315 feet (96 m)

Construction
- Groundbreaking: 1928
- Opened: May 2, 1929
- Renovated: 1987
- Closed: September 10, 1996
- Demolished: Late 1997 – early 1998
- Cost: $415,000 ($7.78 million in 2025 dollars)
- Architect: George W. Thompson
- General contractor: Harrison Dann

Tenants
- Rochester Red Wings (IL) (1929–1996); Rochester Braves (AFL) (1936); Rochester Tigers (AFL) (1936–1937); New York Black Yankees (NNL) (1948)

Silver Stadium was a baseball stadium located at 500 Norton Street in Rochester, New York. It was the home stadium for the Rochester Red Wings of the International League from 1929 to 1996, and for the New York Black Yankees of the Negro National League for their final season in 1948. The ballpark also briefly hosted professional football as it was the home field for the Rochester Braves (second American Football League) in 1936 and the Rochester Tigers (second American Football League) in 1936 and 1937.

The facility opened on May 2, 1929, as Red Wing Stadium. It was renamed to Silver Stadium on August 19, 1968, for Morrie Silver, then the president of Rochester Community Baseball, Inc. Silver Stadium hosted its final event, a Governors' Cup playoff game between the Columbus Clippers and the Red Wings, on September 10, 1996, and was demolished in late 1997 and early 1998. The site is now an industrial and office park. The stadium's nickname was "The Taj Mahal" of minor league ballparks for its grandeur. The stadium was often referred to as the "Wrigley Field of Rochester" due to its similar charm and historical significance to the Chicago Cubs' stadium, Wrigley Field.

== History ==
Silver Stadium cost $415,000 to construct and opened on May 2, 1929, as Red Wing Stadium. At the time, the stadium had a maximum capacity of 15,000. The park was built in the middle of a thriving urban residential neighborhood, which like most suffered a decline in the latter half of the century. Plentiful parking for automobiles, not a huge concern at the time it was built, became an issue as more and more fans drove their cars to the ballpark.

In late 1956, the St. Louis Cardinals, then the major league affiliate of the Rochester Red Wings and also the owners of Red Wing Stadium and the Red Wings, were exploring the possibility of removing the franchise from their minor league system. In response, Morrie Silver, a Rochester businessman, spearheaded an effort to purchase both assets from the Cardinals. A total of 8,222 stockholders, including Silver, came together to form Rochester Community Baseball, Inc. (RCB) The effort was ultimately successful as RCB purchased both assets on February 27, 1957, ensuring that the team would remain in Rochester for the 1957 season and beyond. Red Wing Stadium was renamed Silver Stadium in Silver's honor on August 19, 1968.

Major League Baseball mandated changes to minor league ballparks in the 1990s to both upgrade the field of play and the facilities that the players used. Even though it was renovated in the mid-1980s, Silver was deficient in a number of these areas. Like most old ballparks of its era, it did not have any corporate luxury suites. The official story is that public sentiment in Rochester was in favor of building a new ballpark somewhere closer to the downtown area, with plenty of parking and access to expressways. However, at various times, proposals were made to build the new stadium in one of Rochester's suburbs, namely Greece, Avon and Victor.

Ground was broken on Frontier Field, a new stadium located in downtown Rochester next to Eastman Kodak's world headquarters, in 1995. Frontier Field opened on July 11, 1996, allowing Silver Stadium to close on September 10, 1996. Silver Stadium was demolished in late 1997 and early 1998, and the site is now an industrial and office park.

== Events ==
The Rochester Red Wings of the International League moved from the Bay Street Ball Grounds to Red Wing Stadium following the 1928 season. Red Wing Stadium opened May 2, 1929, with a regular season game between the Red Wings and the Reading Keystones. Rochester lost, 3–0. The Wings continued to play at the facility until the 1996 season. On August 31, 1996, the Red Wings lost, 8–5, to the Ottawa Lynx in the final regular season game at Silver Stadium in front of a crowd 12,756. Rochester also lost the final game ever at Silver Stadium, game two of the Governors' Cup Finals on September 10, 1996, by a margin of 4–0 to the Columbus Clippers. The Red Wings moved to Frontier Field for the 1997 season.

The New York Black Yankees of the Negro National League played at Red Wing Stadium in 1948. The season was the last in the team's history.

Outside of baseball, the ballpark briefly hosted professional football as Red Wing Stadium was the home field for the Rochester Braves (second American Football League) in 1936 and the Rochester Tigers (second American Football League) in 1936 and 1937.

Johnny Antonelli, a Rochester native who won the 1954 World Series as part of the New York Giants, ran a local Firestone business which sponsored "Johnny Antonelli Night" each year at the ballpark. As part of the festivities, the company would give away tires and televisions during the games.

Jim Kelly held his fourth-annual StarGaze charity event at the stadium in June 1995.

The largest attendance at the stadium was 31,000, for a concert by The Grateful Dead on June 30, 1988, eclipsing their previous record of 30,100, on July 2, 1987. The second largest attendance corresponded to a “Billy Graham Crusade” in September 1988 which featured Christian artist Steve Green.

Events and tenants
Preceded by Bay Street Ball Grounds	Home of the Rochester Red Wings; 1929–1996	Succeeded by Frontier Field
Preceded by University at Buffalo Stadium	StarGaze; 1995	Succeeded by Final event
