= Buffalo Bisons (1886–1970) =

Former Minor League Baseball team in Buffalo, New York from 1886–1970

- 1886–1970; Buffalo, New York

Minor league affiliations
- Class: Class AAA (1946–1970)
- Previous classes: Class AA (1912–1945); Class A (1891, 1895–1911); Unclassified (1886–1890, 1892–1894)
- League: International League (1912–1970)
- Previous leagues: Eastern League (1901–1911); American League (1900); Western League (1899); Eastern League (1891–1898); International Association (1888–1890); International League (1887); Eastern League (1886)

Major league affiliations
- Team: Montreal Expos (1970); Washington Senators (1968–1969); Cincinnati Reds (1966–1967); New York Mets (1963–1965); Philadelphia Phillies (1959–1962); Kansas City Athletics (1957–1958); Detroit Tigers (1952–1955); Philadelphia Athletics (1950); Detroit Tigers (1941–1949); Cleveland Indians (1939)

Minor league titles
- Class titles (3): 1904; 1906; 1961
- League titles (10): 1891; 1904; 1906; 1915; 1916; 1927; 1933; 1936; 1957; 1961

Team data
- Ballpark: War Memorial Stadium (1961–1970); Hyde Park Stadium (1967–1968); Offermann Stadium (1924–1960); Buffalo Baseball Park (1889–1923); Olympic Park (1884–1888); Riverside Park (1879–1883)
- Owner(s)/ Operator(s): Buffalo Baseball Club, Inc. (1914–1927); Frank J. Offermann (1928–1935); Offermann family & estate (1935–1952); Detroit Tigers (1952–1955); Buffalo Community Baseball (1956–1970); Montreal Expos (June 1970)

The Buffalo Bisons were a professional Triple-A minor league baseball team based in Buffalo, New York, that was founded in 1886 and last played in the International League from 1912 to 1970.

Over the course of their existence, the Bisons won the Junior World Series three times (1904, 1906, and 1961). They also won 10 league championships, including the inaugural Governors' Cup in 1933. The 1927 Bisons were recognized as one of the 100 greatest minor league teams of all time.

Buffalo Baseball Park got a new grandstand in time for the 1923 season.

The team was last affiliated with the Montreal Expos of Major League Baseball and played its home games at War Memorial Stadium. The franchise moved to Winnipeg, Manitoba, in the middle of the 1970 season to become the Winnipeg Whips.

== History ==
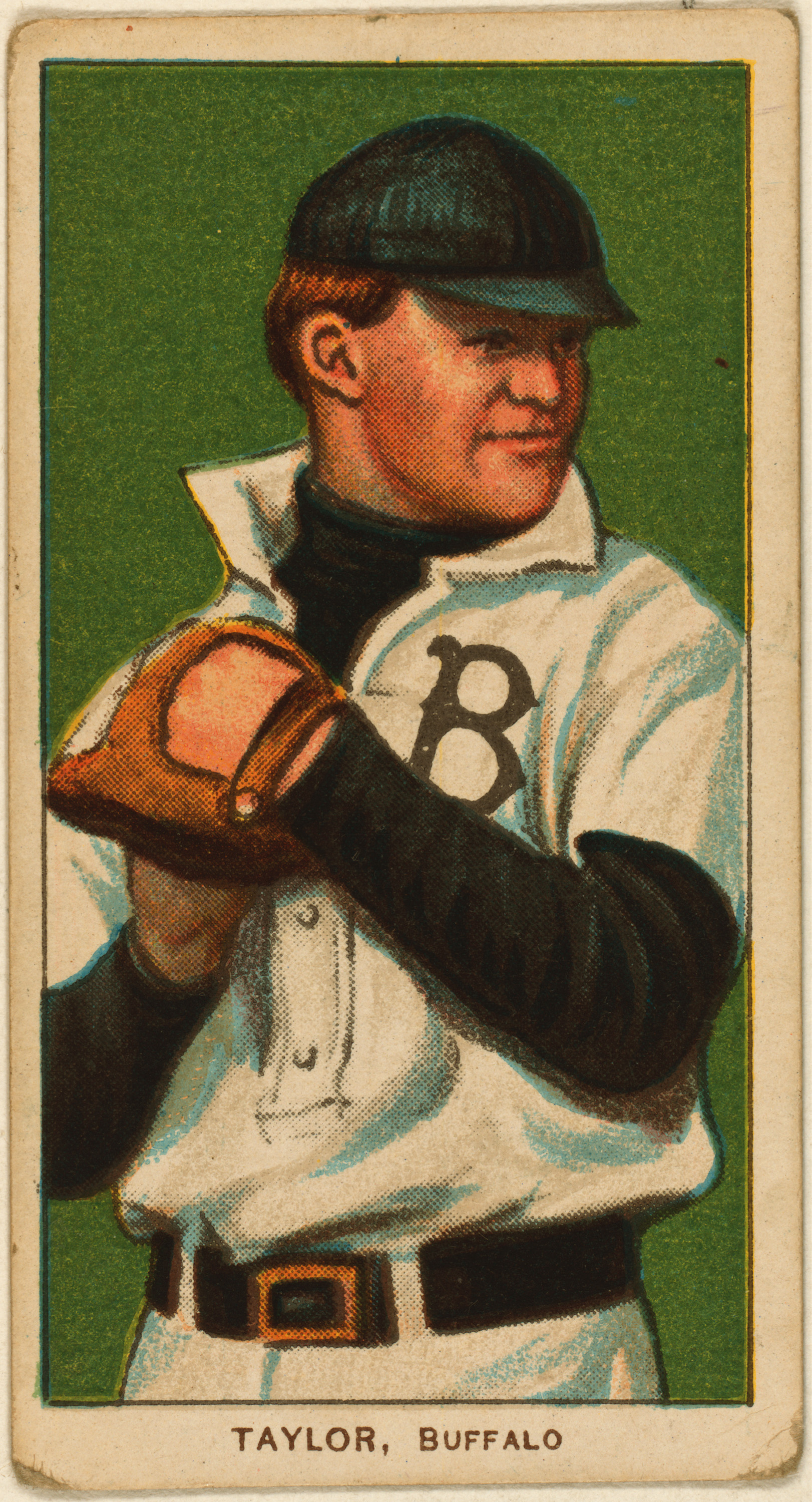
T206 Baseball Card for Buffalo Bisons Pitcher Dummy Taylor, circa 1909-11

Organized baseball in Buffalo had existed since at least 1859, when the Niagara baseball club of the National Association of Base Ball Players played its first season. The first professional team to play in Buffalo began in 1877 as a member of the League Alliance; this team was invited to become a major league club, the Buffalo Bisons of the National League, and played from 1879 to 1885. In 1886, the Bisons moved into minor league baseball as members of the original International League, then known as the Eastern League. (An "outlaw" team also known as the Buffalo Bisons played in the Players' League, an upstart third major league, in 1890, but that team is not considered part of the Bisons history.) This team joined the Western League in 1899, and was within weeks of becoming a major league team when the Western League announced it was becoming a major league and changing its name to the American League in 1900. However, by the start of the 1901 season, Buffalo had been bumped from the league in favor of the Boston Americans; the Bisons returned to the minors and the Eastern League that year.

In 1969, Héctor López became the first black manager at the Triple-A level while managing Buffalo—six years before Frank Robinson became the first black manager in Major League Baseball.

On June 4, 1970, the International League rejected the team's bid to keep the team in Buffalo, and move its home games from War Memorial Stadium to All-High Stadium. The league subsequently stripped Buffalo Community Baseball, Inc. of the team's ownership. The IL awarded the franchise to the team's MLB affiliate, the Montreal Expos, who moved the franchise to Winnipeg, Manitoba, as the Winnipeg Whips.

The reasons for the team relocating was due to poor attendance, stadium woes, the Expos affiliating with the franchise, and an increasingly saturated Buffalo sports market that saw the Buffalo Sabres of the NHL and Buffalo Braves of the NBA established the same year. (The team had narrowly avoided relocation in 1955, but an idea of selling common stock in the team by John Stiglmeir prevented the team from leaving; it nonetheless was forced to move into a football venue, Buffalo War Memorial Stadium, a few years later, after its existing ballpark closed.)

After stops in Winnipeg and Hampton, Virginia, the team was suspended after the 1973 season to make way for the Memphis Blues, who were moving up from Double-A only to move to Charleston as the reborn Charleston Charlies, before picking up stakes again to become the Maine Guides/Phillies. The team moved one more time in 1989, becoming the Scranton-Wilkes/Barre Red Barons - today, the RailRiders.

Buffalo mayor James D. Griffin and an investment group launched the current Buffalo Bisons franchise in 1979, returning professional baseball to Buffalo. Robert E. Rich Jr. purchased the franchise from the city in 1983, and continues to operate the team to this very day.

== National Baseball Hall of Fame members ==
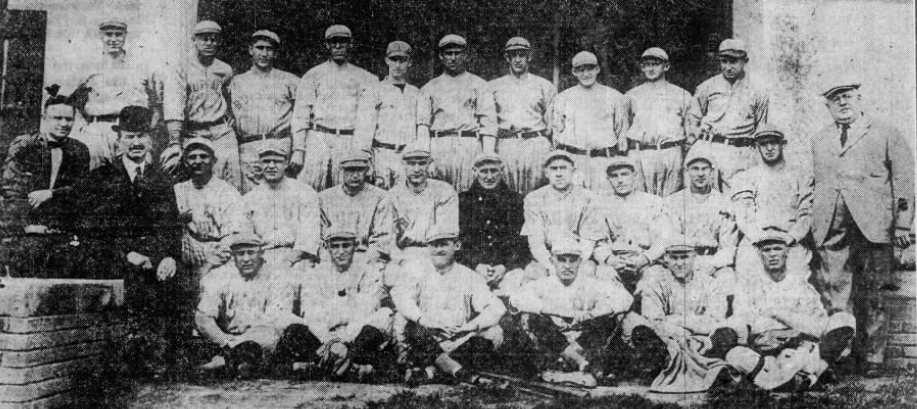
Buffalo Bisons at spring training in 1922

Player/Manager	Year inducted	Years with the Bisons
Jimmy Collins	1945	1893–1894
Joe Tinker	1946	1930 (Coach)
Herb Pennock	1948	1916
Bill Dickey	1954	1928
Gabby Hartnett	1955	1946 (Manager)
Ray Schalk	1955	1932–1937, 1950 (Manager)
Joe McCarthy	1957	1914–1915
Pud Galvin	1965	1894
Lou Boudreau	1970	1939
Bucky Harris	1975	1918–1919, 1944–1945 (Manager)
Johnny Bench	1989	1966–1967
Ferguson Jenkins	1991	1962
Jim Bunning	1996	1953, 1955
Frank Grant	2006	1886–1888
