= Columbus Jets =

- 1955–1970; Columbus, Ohio

Minor league affiliations
- Class: Triple-A (1955–1970)
- League: International League (1955–1970)

Major league affiliations
- Team: Pittsburgh Pirates (1957–1970); Kansas City Athletics (1955–1956)

Minor league titles
- League titles: None

Team data
- Name: Columbus Jets (1955–1970)
- Ballpark: Jets Stadium (1955–1970)
- General manager: Harold Cooper (1955-1968); Charles Wareham (1969-1970)

The Columbus Jets were a Minor League baseball team that played in Columbus, Ohio, from 1955 to 1970. The team moved from Ottawa, Ontario, Canada where they were known as the Ottawa Athletics. The Jets were a member of the Triple-A International League.

The Jets' name came from Columbus' role in manufacturing aircraft by North American Aviation for World War II.

They were the Triple-A affiliate of the Kansas City Athletics (1955–56) and Pittsburgh Pirates (1957–70). The Jets played their home games at Jets Stadium.

In 1971 the franchise moved to Charleston, West Virginia, and became the Charleston Charlies, leaving Columbus without organized baseball for the first time since 1894. In 1977 the Columbus Clippers returned baseball to Ohio's capital.

== Notable alumni ==
- Steve Arlin
- Bob Bailey
- Steve Blass
- Donn Clendenon
- Dock Ellis
- Johnny Lipon
- Bob Kuzava
- Julián Javier
- Román Mejías
- Pat Gillick
- Manny Mota
- Gene Michael
- Richie Hebner
- Milt May
- Al Oliver
- Freddie Patek
- Dave Roberts
- Manny Sanguillén
- Billy Shantz
- Willie Stargell
- Bob Veale
- Frank Verdi
- Wilbur Wood

== Yearly record ==
Year	Record	Finish Full Season	Attendance	Manager	Postseason
1955	64–89	Seventh	202,854	Nick Cullop	DNQ
1956	69–84	Seventh	163,128	Nick Cullop	DNQ
1957	69–85	Seventh	180,418	Frank Oceak	DNQ
1958	77–77	Fourth	196,644	Clyde King	Lost to Montreal in first round
1959	84–70	Second	204,157	Cal Ermer	Lost to Havana in first round
1960	69–84	Sixth	136,195	Cal Ermer	DNQ
1961	92–62	First	187,471	Larry Shepard	Lost to Rochester in first round
1962	80–74	Fifth	191,730	Larry Shepard	DNQ
1963	75–73	Fourth (South Division)	167,121	Larry Shepard	DNQ
1964	68–85	Sixth	134,448	Larry Shepard	DNQ
1965	85–61	First	197,680	Larry Shepard	Lost to Toronto in finals
1966	82–65	Second (tied)	193,881	Larry Shepard	Lost to Toronto in first round
1967	69–71	Fourth	148,365	Harding "Pete" Peterson	Lost to Toledo in finals
1968	82–64	Second	178,003	Johnny Pesky	Lost to Jacksonville in finals
1969	74–66	Fourth	153,802	Don Hoak	Lost to Syracuse in finals
1970	81–59	Second	140,700	Joe Morgan	Lost to Syracuse in finals
