= 1926 International League season =

- League: International League
- Sport: Baseball
- Duration: April 14 – September 19
- Games: 168
- Teams: 8

International League Pennant
- League champions: Toronto Maple Leafs
- Runners-up: Baltimore Orioles

IL seasons
- ← 1925 1927 →

The 1926 International League was a Class AA baseball season played from April 14 to September 19. Eight teams competed in a 168-game schedule, with the first place team winning the pennant.

The Toronto Maple Leafs won the International League pennant, finishing in first place, eight games ahead of the second place Baltimore Orioles.

== Team changes ==
- The Newark Bears returned to Newark, New Jersey following a temporary relocation to Providence, Rhode Island during the 1925 season. The Bears will play at a newly built ballpark, Davids' Stadium.
- The Toronto Maple Leafs moved into a new ballpark, Maple Leaf Stadium.

== Teams ==
1926 International League
Team	City	MLB Affiliate	Stadium
Baltimore Orioles	Baltimore, Maryland	None	Oriole Park
Buffalo Bisons	Buffalo, New York	None	Bison Stadium
Jersey City Skeeters	Jersey City, New Jersey	None	West Side Park
Newark Bears	Newark, New Jersey	None	Davids' Stadium
Reading Keystones	Reading, Pennsylvania	None	Lauer's Park
Rochester Tribe	Rochester, New York	None	Bay Street Ball Grounds
Syracuse Stars	Syracuse, New York	None	Star Park
Toronto Maple Leafs	Toronto, Ontario	None	Maple Leaf Stadium

== Map of teams ==
International League teams

== Regular season ==
=== Summary ===
- The Toronto Maple Leafs won the pennant, snapping the Baltimore Orioles streak of seven consecutive pennants. The Maple Leafs finished the season with a 38-6 record, overtaking Baltimore late in the season to finish with the best record in the league.
- The Reading Keystones had the worst season in league history, as the club had a record of 31-129, finishing with a .194 winning percentage.
- Bill Kelly of the Buffalo Bisons hit a league record 44 home runs.

=== Standings ===
International League
Team	Win	Loss	%	GB
Toronto Maple Leafs	109	57	.657	–
Baltimore Orioles	101	65	.608	8
Newark Bears	99	65	.604	9
Buffalo Bisons	92	72	.561	16
Rochester Tribe	81	83	.494	27
Jersey City Skeeters	72	92	.439	36
Syracuse Stars	70	91	.435	36.5
Reading Keystones	31	129	.194	75

== League Leaders ==
=== Batting leaders ===
Stat	Player	Total
AVG	Jimmy Walsh, Buffalo Bisons	.388
H	Fresco Thompson, Buffalo Bisons	217
R	Fresco Thompson, Buffalo Bisons	150
2B	George Burns, Newark Bears	49
3B	Blackie Carter, Newark Bears; Herman Layne, Toronto Maple Leafs	16
HR	Bill Kelly, Buffalo Bisons	44
RBI	Bill Kelly, Buffalo Bisons	151
SB	George Burns, Newark Bears	38

=== Pitching leaders ===
Stat	Player	Total
W	Jack Ogden, Baltimore Orioles	24
L	Moose Swaney, Reading Keystones	29
ERA	Al Mamaux, Newark Bears	2.22
CG	Moose Swaney, Reading Keystones	28
SHO	Lefty Stewart, Toronto Maple Leafs	6
SO	Roy Chesterfield, Newark Bears	141
IP	Moose Swaney, Reading Keystones	311.0

== See also ==
- 1926 Major League Baseball season
