= 1921 International League season =

- League: International League
- Sport: Baseball
- Duration: April 20 – September 25
- Games: 168
- Teams: 8

International League Pennant
- League champions: Baltimore Orioles
- Runners-up: Rochester Colts

IL seasons
- ← 1920 1922 →

The 1921 International League was a Class AA baseball season played between April 20 and September 25. Eight teams played a 168-game schedule, with the first place team winning the pennant.

The Baltimore Orioles won the International League pennant, finishing in first place, twenty games ahead of the second place Rochester Colts.

== Team changes ==
- The Akron Buckeyes folded.
- The Newark Bears rejoined the league.
- The Reading Marines are renamed the Reading Aces.
- The Rochester Hustlers are renamed the Rochester Colts.

== Teams ==
1921 International League
Team	City	MLB Affiliate	Stadium
Baltimore Orioles	Baltimore, Maryland	None	Oriole Park
Buffalo Bisons	Buffalo, New York	None	Buffalo Baseball Park
Jersey City Skeeters	Jersey City, New Jersey	None	West Side Park
Newark Bears	Newark, New Jersey	None	Harrison Park
Reading Aces	Reading, Pennsylvania	None	Lauer's Park
Rochester Colts	Rochester, New York	None	Bay Street Ball Grounds
Syracuse Stars	Syracuse, New York	None	Star Park
Toronto Maple Leafs	Toronto, Ontario	None	Hanlan's Point Stadium

== Map of teams ==
International League teams

== Regular season ==
=== Wins record ===
The Baltimore Orioles won an International League record 119 games and their third consecutive pennant.

=== Standings ===
International League
Team	Win	Loss	%	GB
Baltimore Orioles	119	47	.717	–
Rochester Colts	100	68	.595	20
Buffalo Bisons	99	69	.589	21
Toronto Maple Leafs	89	77	.536	30
Newark Bears	72	92	.439	46
Syracuse Stars	71	96	.425	48.5
Jersey City Skeeters	59	106	.358	59.5
Reading Aces	56	110	.337	63

== League Leaders ==
=== Batting leaders ===
Stat	Player	Total
AVG	Jack Bentley, Baltimore Orioles	.412
H	Jack Bentley, Baltimore Orioles	246
2B	Jack Bentley, Baltimore Orioles	47
3B	Bob Fothergill, Rochester Colts; Norm McMillan, Rochester Colts	23
HR	Jack Bentley, Baltimore Orioles	24

=== Pitching leaders ===
Stat	Player	Total
W	Jack Ogden, Baltimore Orioles	31
L	Clarence Fisher, Reading Aces	25
ERA	Johnny Enzmann, Toronto Maple Leafs	2.25
CG	Jack Ogden, Baltimore Orioles	33
SHO	Jack Ogden, Baltimore Orioles	6
SO	Lefty Grove, Baltimore Orioles	254
IP	Jack Ogden, Baltimore Orioles	318.0

== See also ==
- 1921 Major League Baseball season
