= 1923 International League season =

- League: International League
- Sport: Baseball
- Duration: April 18 – September 23
- Games: 168
- Teams: 8

International League Pennant
- League champions: Baltimore Orioles
- Runners-up: Rochester Tribe

IL seasons
- ← 1922 1924 →

The 1923 International League was a Class AA baseball season played between April 18 and September 23. Eight teams played a 168-game schedule, with the first place team winning the pennant.

The Baltimore Orioles won the International League pennant, finishing in first place, eleven games ahead of the second place Rochester Tribe.

== Team changes ==
- The Reading Aces are renamed the Reading Keystones.

== Teams ==
1923 International League
Team	City	MLB Affiliate	Stadium
Baltimore Orioles	Baltimore, Maryland	None	Oriole Park
Buffalo Bisons	Buffalo, New York	None	Buffalo Baseball Park
Jersey City Skeeters	Jersey City, New Jersey	None	West Side Park
Newark Bears	Newark, New Jersey	None	Harrison Park
Reading Keystones	Reading, Pennsylvania	None	Lauer's Park
Rochester Tribe	Rochester, New York	None	Bay Street Ball Grounds
Syracuse Stars	Syracuse, New York	None	Star Park
Toronto Maple Leafs	Toronto, Ontario	None	Hanlan's Point Stadium

== Map of teams ==
International League teams

== Regular season ==
=== Summary ===
- The Baltimore Orioles won their fifth consecutive pennant, finishing eleven games ahead of the Rochester Tribe.
- Lefty Grove of the Baltimore Orioles set a league record with 330 strikeouts.
- Harrison Park, the home field of the Newark Bears, was destroyed by a fire following a game played there on August 18. The Bears completed the season on the road.

=== Standings ===
International League
Team	Win	Loss	%	GB
Baltimore Orioles	111	53	.677	–
Rochester Tribe	101	65	.608	11
Reading Keystones	85	79	.518	26
Buffalo Bisons	83	81	.506	28
Toronto Maple Leafs	81	79	.506	28
Syracuse Stars	73	92	.442	38.5
Newark Bears	60	101	.373	49.5
Jersey City Skeeters	61	105	.367	51

== League Leaders ==
=== Batting leaders ===
Stat	Player	Total
AVG	Maurice Archdeacon, Rochester Tribe	.357
H	Maurice Archdeacon, Rochester Tribe	228
R	Maurice Archdeacon, Rochester Tribe	162
2B	Fred Merkle, Rochester Tribe	54
3B	Fred Thomas, Reading Keystones	17
HR	Max Bishop, Baltimore Orioles; Bill Webb, Buffalo Bisons	22
RBI	Fred Merkle, Rochester Tribe	166
SB	Otis Lawry, Baltimore Orioles	41

=== Pitching leaders ===
Stat	Player	Total
W	Rube Parnham, Baltimore Orioles	33
L	Ollie Hanson, Jersey City Skeeters	22
ERA	Joe Lucey, Jersey City Skeeters	2.73
CG	Jack Wisner, Rochester Tribe	33
SHO	Lefty Grove, Baltimore Orioles	6
SO	Lefty Grove, Baltimore Orioles	330
IP	Jack Wisner, Rochester Tribe	338.0

== See also ==
- 1923 Major League Baseball season
