= 1925 International League season =

- League: International League
- Sport: Baseball
- Duration: April 16 – September 28
- Games: 168
- Teams: 8

International League Pennant
- League champions: Baltimore Orioles
- Runners-up: Toronto Maple Leafs

IL seasons
- ← 1924 1926 →

The 1925 International League was a Class AA baseball season played between April 16 and September 28. Eight teams played a 168-game schedule, with the first place team winning the pennant.

The Baltimore Orioles won the International League pennant, finishing in first place, four games ahead of the second place Toronto Maple Leafs.

== Team changes ==
- The Newark Bears temporarily relocated to Providence, Rhode Island during the season, becoming the Providence Grays, as Newark was awaiting for a new stadium to be built.

== Teams ==
1925 International League
Team	City	MLB Affiliate	Stadium
Baltimore Orioles	Baltimore, Maryland	None	Oriole Park
Buffalo Bisons	Buffalo, New York	None	Bison Stadium
Jersey City Skeeters	Jersey City, New Jersey	None	West Side Park
Newark Bears; Providence Grays	Newark, New Jersey; Providence, Rhode Island	None	Meadowbrook Oval; Kinsley Park
Reading Keystones	Reading, Pennsylvania	None	Lauer's Park
Rochester Tribe	Rochester, New York	None	Bay Street Ball Grounds
Syracuse Stars	Syracuse, New York	None	Star Park
Toronto Maple Leafs	Toronto, Ontario	None	Hanlan's Point Stadium

== Map of teams ==
International League teams

== Regular season ==
=== Summary ===
- The Baltimore Orioles won their seventh consecutive pennant, finishing four games ahead of the Toronto Maple Leafs.

=== Standings ===
International League
Team	Win	Loss	%	GB
Baltimore Orioles	105	61	.633	–
Toronto Maple Leafs	99	63	.611	4
Rochester Tribe	83	77	.519	19
Buffalo Bisons	78	84	.481	25
Reading Keystones	78	90	.464	28
Syracuse Stars	74	87	.460	28.5
Jersey City Skeeters	74	92	.446	31
Newark Bears/Providence Grays	63	100	.387	40.5

== League Leaders ==
=== Batting leaders ===
Stat	Player	Total
AVG	Jimmy Walsh, Buffalo Bisons	.357
H	Vern Spencer, Buffalo Bisons	227
R	Fritz Maisel, Baltimore Orioles	141
2B	Polly McLarry, Reading Keystones	46
3B	George Quellich, Rochester Tribe	21
HR	Joe Kelly, Toronto Maple Leafs	28
RBI	Bill Kelly, Buffalo Bisons	125
SB	Snooks Dowd, Jersey City Skeeters	38

=== Pitching leaders ===
Stat	Player	Total
W	Tommy Thomas, Baltimore Orioles	32
L	Reid Zellars, Jersey City Skeeters	24
ERA	Lefty Stewart, Toronto Maple Leafs	2.51
CG	Tommy Thomas, Baltimore Orioles; Jack Ogden, Baltimore Orioles; Myles Thomas, Toronto Maple Leafs	28
SHO	Jack Ogden, Baltimore Orioles	7
SO	Tommy Thomas, Baltimore Orioles	268
IP	Tommy Thomas, Baltimore Orioles	354.0

== See also ==
- 1925 Major League Baseball season
