= 1920 International League season =

- League: International League
- Sport: Baseball
- Duration: April 21 – September 19
- Games: 154
- Teams: 8

International League Pennant
- League champions: Baltimore Orioles
- Runners-up: Toronto Maple Leafs

IL seasons
- ← 1919 1921 →

The 1920 International League was a Class AA baseball season played between April 21 and September 19. Eight teams played a 154-game schedule, with the first place team winning the pennant.

The Baltimore Orioles won the International League pennant, finishing in first place, one-and-a-half games ahead of the second place Toronto Maple Leafs.

== Team changes ==
- The Binghamton Bingoes relocated to Syracuse, New York and became the Syracuse Stars.
- The Newark Bears relocated to Akron, Ohio and became the Akron Buckeyes.
- The Reading Coal Barons are renamed the Reading Marines.

== Teams ==
1920 International League
Team	City	MLB Affiliate	Stadium
Akron Buckeyes	Akron, Ohio	None	League Park
Baltimore Orioles	Baltimore, Maryland	None	Oriole Park
Buffalo Bisons	Buffalo, New York	None	Buffalo Baseball Park
Jersey City Skeeters	Jersey City, New Jersey	None	West Side Park
Reading Marines	Reading, Pennsylvania	None	Lauer's Park
Rochester Hustlers	Rochester, New York	None	Bay Street Ball Grounds
Syracuse Stars	Syracuse, New York	None	Star Park
Toronto Maple Leafs	Toronto, Ontario	None	Hanlan's Point Stadium

== Map of teams ==
International League teams

== Regular season ==
=== Standings ===
International League
Team	Win	Loss	%	GB
Baltimore Orioles	109	44	.712	–
Toronto Maple Leafs	108	46	.701	1.5
Buffalo Bisons	96	57	.627	13
Akron Buckeyes	89	62	.589	19
Reading Marines	65	85	.433	42.5
Jersey City Skeeters	62	91	.405	47
Rochester Hustlers	45	106	.298	63
Syracuse Stars	33	116	.221	74

== League Leaders ==
=== Batting leaders ===
Stat	Player	Total
AVG	Merwin Jacobson, Baltimore Orioles	.405
H	Merwin Jacobson, Baltimore Orioles	235
R	Merwin Jacobson, Baltimore Orioles	161
2B	Bill Holden, Baltimore Orioles	49
3B	Al White, Rochester Hustlers	17
HR	Frank Brower, Reading Marines; Mike Konnick, Reading Marines	22
RBI	Jack Bentley, Baltimore Orioles	161
SB	Snooks Dowd, Buffalo Bisons	59

=== Pitching leaders ===
Stat	Player	Total
W	Jack Ogden, Baltimore Orioles; Red Shea, Toronto Maple Leafs	27
L	Virgil Barnes, Rochester Hustlers	23
ERA	Red Shea, Toronto Maple Leafs	1.97
CG	Jack Ogden, Baltimore Orioles	31
SHO	Red Shea, Toronto Maple Leafs	7
SO	Virgil Barnes, Rochester Hustlers	142
IP	Red Shea, Toronto Maple Leafs	398.0

== See also ==
- 1920 Major League Baseball season
