= 1922 International League season =

- League: International League
- Sport: Baseball
- Duration: April 12 – September 24
- Games: 168
- Teams: 8

International League Pennant
- League champions: Baltimore Orioles
- Runners-up: Rochester Tribe

IL seasons
- ← 1921 1923 →

The 1922 International League was a Class AA baseball season played between April 12 and September 24. Eight teams played a 168-game schedule, with the first place team winning the pennant.

The Baltimore Orioles won the International League pennant, finishing in first place, ten games ahead of the second place Rochester Tribe.

== Team changes ==
- The Rochester Hustlers are renamed the Rochester Tribe.

== Teams ==
1922 International League
Team	City	MLB Affiliate	Stadium
Baltimore Orioles	Baltimore, Maryland	None	Oriole Park
Buffalo Bisons	Buffalo, New York	None	Buffalo Baseball Park
Jersey City Skeeters	Jersey City, New Jersey	None	West Side Park
Newark Bears	Newark, New Jersey	None	Harrison Park
Reading Aces	Reading, Pennsylvania	None	Lauer's Park
Rochester Tribe	Rochester, New York	None	Bay Street Ball Grounds
Syracuse Stars	Syracuse, New York	None	Star Park
Toronto Maple Leafs	Toronto, Ontario	None	Hanlan's Point Stadium

== Map of teams ==
International League teams

== Regular season ==
=== Summary ===
- The Baltimore Orioles won their fourth consecutive pennant, finishing ten games ahead of the Rochester Tribe.
- Al Wingo of the Toronto Maple Leafs set a new league record for home runs, as he hit 34.

=== Standings ===
International League
Team	Win	Loss	%	GB
Baltimore Orioles	115	52	.689	–
Rochester Tribe	105	62	.629	10
Buffalo Bisons	95	72	.569	20
Jersey City Skeeters	83	82	.503	31
Toronto Maple Leafs	76	88	.463	37.5
Reading Aces	71	93	.433	42.5
Syracuse Stars	64	102	.386	50.5
Newark Bears	54	112	.325	60.5

== League Leaders ==
=== Batting leaders ===
Stat	Player	Total
AVG	Bob Fothergill, Rochester Tribe	.383
H	Frank Gilhooley, Reading Aces	230
R	Maurice Archdeacon, Rochester Tribe	151
2B	Jimmy Walsh, Baltimore Orioles	47
3B	Johnny Jacobs, Jersey City Skeeters	20
HR	Al Wingo, Toronto Maple Leafs	34
RBI	Fred Merkle, Rochester Tribe	155
SB	Maurice Archdeacon, Rochester Tribe	55

=== Pitching leaders ===
Stat	Player	Total
W	Jack Ogden, Baltimore Orioles	24
L	Luther Barnes, Newark Bears	23
ERA	Chief Bender, Reading Aces	2.41
CG	Dean Barnhardt, Newark Bears	30
SHO	Bill Hughes, Rochester Tribe	6
SO	Lefty Grove, Baltimore Orioles	205
IP	Jack Ogden, Baltimore Orioles	310.0

== See also ==
- 1922 Major League Baseball season
