= 1918 International League season =

- League: International League
- Sport: Baseball
- Duration: May 8 – September 15
- Games: 130
- Teams: 8

International League Pennant
- League champions: Toronto Maple Leafs
- Runners-up: Binghamton Bingoes

IL seasons
- ← 1917 1919 →

The 1918 International League was a Class AA baseball season played between May 8 and September 15. Eight teams played a 130-game schedule, with the first place team winning the pennant.

The Toronto Maple Leafs won the International League pennant, finishing in first place, one game ahead of the second place Binghamton Bingoes.

== Team changes ==
- The Montreal Royals leave the league due to their stadium, Atwater Park, burning down.
- The Providence Grays moved to the Eastern League.
- The Richmond Virginians fold.
- The Binghamton Bingoes join the league from the New York State League.
- The Jersey City Skeeters rejoin the league.
- The Syracuse Stars join the league from the New York State League. The team would relocate to Hamilton, Ontario during the season and become the Hamilton Tigers.

== Teams ==
1918 International League
| Team | City | MLB Affiliate | Stadium |
| Baltimore Orioles | Baltimore, Maryland | None | Oriole Park |
| Binghamton Bingoes | Binghamton, New York | None | Johnson Field |
| Buffalo Bisons | Buffalo, New York | None | Buffalo Baseball Park |
| Jersey City Skeeters | Jersey City, New Jersey | None | West Side Park |
| Newark Bears | Newark, New Jersey | None | Harrison Park |
| Rochester Hustlers | Rochester, New York | None | Bay Street Ball Grounds |
| Syracuse Stars; Hamilton Tigers | Syracuse, New York; Hamilton, Ontario | None | Star Park; Hamilton AAA Grounds |
| Toronto Maple Leafs | Toronto, Ontario | None | Hanlan's Point Stadium |

== Map of teams ==
International League teams

== Regular season ==
=== Standings ===
International League
| Team | Win | Loss | % | GB |
|---|---|---|---|---|
| Toronto Maple Leafs | 88 | 39 | .693 | – |
| Binghamton Bingoes | 85 | 38 | .691 | 1 |
| Baltimore Orioles | 74 | 53 | .583 | 14 |
| Newark Bears | 64 | 63 | .504 | 24 |
| Rochester Hustlers | 60 | 61 | .496 | 25 |
| Buffalo Bisons | 53 | 68 | .438 | 32 |
| Syracuse Stars/Hamilton Tigers | 38 | 76 | .333 | 43.5 |
| Jersey City Skeeters | 30 | 94 | .242 | 56.5 |

== League Leaders ==
=== Batting leaders ===
| Stat | Player | Total |
|---|---|---|
| AVG | Polly McLarry, Binghamton Bingoes | .385 |
| H | Emmett Mulvey, Baltimore Orioles; Otis Lawry, Baltimore Orioles | 149 |
| 2B | Polly McLarry, Binghamton Bingoes | 26 |
| 3B | Earl Smith, Rochester Hustlers | 14 |
| HR | Fred Lear, Toronto Maple Leafs | 5 |
| SB | Otis Lawry, Baltimore Orioles | 35 |

=== Pitching leaders ===
| Stat | Player | Total |
|---|---|---|
| W | Ralph Worrell, Baltimore Orioles | 25 |
| L | Godfrey Brogan, Rochester Hustlers | 18 |
| ERA | Harry Heitmann, Rochester Hustlers | 1.32 |
| SO | Godfrey Brogan, Rochester Hustlers | 157 |

== See also ==
- 1918 Major League Baseball season
