= 1924 International League season =

- League: International League
- Sport: Baseball
- Duration: April 16 – September 28
- Games: 168
- Teams: 8

International League Pennant
- League champions: Baltimore Orioles
- Runners-up: Toronto Maple Leafs

IL seasons
- ← 1923 1925 →

The 1924 International League was a Class AA baseball season played between April 16 and September 28. Eight teams played a 168-game schedule, with the first place team winning the pennant.

The Baltimore Orioles won the International League pennant, finishing in first place, nineteen games ahead of the second place Toronto Maple Leafs.

== Team changes ==
- The Buffalo Bisons moved into a new stadium, Bison Stadium.
- The Newark Bears moved into a temporary new home, Meadowbrook Oval, after Harrison Park was destroyed by a fire in August 1923.

== Teams ==
1924 International League
Team	City	MLB Affiliate	Stadium
Baltimore Orioles	Baltimore, Maryland	None	Oriole Park
Buffalo Bisons	Buffalo, New York	None	Bison Stadium
Jersey City Skeeters	Jersey City, New Jersey	None	West Side Park
Newark Bears	Newark, New Jersey	None	Meadowbrook Oval
Reading Keystones	Reading, Pennsylvania	None	Lauer's Park
Rochester Tribe	Rochester, New York	None	Bay Street Ball Grounds
Syracuse Stars	Syracuse, New York	None	Star Park
Toronto Maple Leafs	Toronto, Ontario	None	Hanlan's Point Stadium

== Map of teams ==
International League teams

== Regular season ==
=== Summary ===
- The Baltimore Orioles won their sixth consecutive pennant, finishing nineteen games ahead of the Toronto Maple Leafs.

=== Standings ===
International League
Team	Win	Loss	%	GB
Baltimore Orioles	117	48	.709	–
Toronto Maple Leafs	98	67	.594	19
Buffalo Bisons	84	83	.503	34
Rochester Tribe	83	84	.497	35
Newark Bears	80	83	.491	36
Syracuse Stars	79	83	.488	36.5
Reading Keystones	63	98	.391	52
Jersey City Skeeters	53	111	.323	63.5

== League Leaders ==
=== Batting leaders ===
Stat	Player	Total
AVG	Dick Porter, Baltimore Orioles	.364
H	Jocko Conlan, Rochester Tribe	214
R	Billy Zitzmann, Newark Bears	137
2B	Red Holt, Jersey City Skeeters	57
3B	Dutch Wetzel, Syracuse Stars	17
HR	Bill Kelly, Buffalo Bisons	28
RBI	Bill Kelly, Buffalo Bisons	155
SB	Mel Silva, Syracuse/Reading	41

=== Pitching leaders ===
Stat	Player	Total
W	Lefty Grove, Baltimore Orioles	26
L	Dean Barnhardt, Jersey City Skeeters	25
ERA	Walter Beall, Rochester Tribe	2.76
CG	Lefty Stewart, Toronto Maple Leafs	31
SHO	Lefty Grove, Baltimore Orioles	5
SO	Lefty Grove, Baltimore Orioles	231
IP	Walter Beall, Rochester Tribe	310.0

== See also ==
- 1924 Major League Baseball season
