= 1927 International League season =

- League: International League
- Sport: Baseball
- Duration: April 13 – September 18
- Games: 168
- Teams: 8

International League Pennant
- League champions: Buffalo Bisons
- Runners-up: Syracuse Stars

IL seasons
- ← 1926 1928 →

The 1927 International League was a Class AA baseball season played between April 13 and September 18. Eight teams played a 168-game schedule, with the first place team winning the pennant.

The Buffalo Bisons won the International League pennant, finishing in first place, ten games ahead of the second place Syracuse Stars.

== Team changes ==
- This was the first season in which an International League team was affiliated with a Major League Baseball team, as the Reading Keystones were affiliated with the Chicago Cubs and the Syracuse Stars with the St. Louis Cardinals.

== Teams ==
1927 International League
| Team | City | MLB Affiliate | Stadium |
| Baltimore Orioles | Baltimore, Maryland | None | Oriole Park |
| Buffalo Bisons | Buffalo, New York | None | Bison Stadium |
| Jersey City Skeeters | Jersey City, New Jersey | None | West Side Park |
| Newark Bears | Newark, New Jersey | None | Davids' Stadium |
| Reading Keystones | Reading, Pennsylvania | Chicago Cubs | Lauer's Park |
| Rochester Tribe | Rochester, New York | None | Bay Street Ball Grounds |
| Syracuse Stars | Syracuse, New York | St. Louis Cardinals | Star Park |
| Toronto Maple Leafs | Toronto, Ontario | None | Maple Leaf Stadium |

== Map of teams ==
International League teams

== Regular season ==
=== Summary ===
- The Buffalo Bisons won the pennant for the first time since the 1916 season.

=== Standings ===
International League
| Team | Win | Loss | % | GB |
|---|---|---|---|---|
| Buffalo Bisons | 112 | 56 | .667 | – |
| Syracuse Stars | 102 | 66 | .607 | 10 |
| Newark Bears | 90 | 77 | .539 | 21.5 |
| Toronto Maple Leafs | 89 | 78 | .533 | 22.5 |
| Baltimore Orioles | 85 | 82 | .509 | 26.5 |
| Rochester Tribe | 81 | 86 | .485 | 30.5 |
| Jersey City Skeeters | 66 | 100 | .398 | 45 |
| Reading Keystones | 43 | 123 | .259 | 68 |

== League Leaders ==
=== Batting leaders ===
| Stat | Player | Total |
|---|---|---|
| AVG | Dick Porter, Baltimore Orioles | .376 |
| H | Del Bissonette, Buffalo Bisons | 229 |
| R | Del Bissonette, Buffalo Bisons | 168 |
| 2B | Del Bissonette, Buffalo Bisons | 46 |
| 3B | Del Bissonette, Buffalo Bisons | 20 |
| HR | Dick Porter, Baltimore Orioles | 25 |
| RBI | Del Bissonette, Buffalo Bisons | 167 |
| SB | Harry Layne, Syracuse Stars | 50 |

=== Pitching leaders ===
| Stat | Player | Total |
|---|---|---|
| W | Al Mamaux, Newark Bears | 25 |
| L | George Earnshaw, Baltimore Orioles; Joe Zubris, Newark Bears | 18 |
| ERA | Al Mamaux, Newark Bears | 2.61 |
| CG | Al Mamaux, Newark Bears | 30 |
| SHO | Leo Mangum, Buffalo Bisons | 5 |
| SO | Bill Hallahan, Syracuse Stars | 195 |
| IP | Al Mamaux, Newark Bears | 318.0 |

== See also ==
- 1927 Major League Baseball season
