= 1919 International League season =

- League: International League
- Sport: Baseball
- Duration: April 30 – September 14
- Games: 154
- Teams: 8

International League Pennant
- League champions: Baltimore Orioles
- Runners-up: Toronto Maple Leafs

IL seasons
- ← 1918 1920 →

The 1919 International League was a Class AA baseball season played between April 30 and September 14. Eight teams played a 154-game schedule, with the first place team winning the pennant.

The Baltimore Orioles won the International League pennant, finishing in first place, eight games ahead of the second place Toronto Maple Leafs.

== Team changes ==
- The Hamilton Tigers moved to the Michigan-Ontario League.
- The Reading Coal Barons join the league.

== Teams ==
1919 International League
| Team | City | MLB Affiliate | Stadium |
| Baltimore Orioles | Baltimore, Maryland | None | Oriole Park |
| Binghamton Bingoes | Binghamton, New York | None | Johnson Field |
| Buffalo Bisons | Buffalo, New York | None | Buffalo Baseball Park |
| Jersey City Skeeters | Jersey City, New Jersey | None | West Side Park |
| Newark Bears | Newark, New Jersey | None | Harrison Park |
| Reading Coal Barons | Reading, Pennsylvania | None | Lauer's Park |
| Rochester Hustlers | Rochester, New York | None | Bay Street Ball Grounds |
| Toronto Maple Leafs | Toronto, Ontario | None | Hanlan's Point Stadium |

== Map of teams ==
International League teams

== Regular season ==
=== Baltimore Orioles ===
The Baltimore Orioles became the first team in league history to win 100 games in a season.

=== Standings ===
International League
| Team | Win | Loss | % | GB |
|---|---|---|---|---|
| Baltimore Orioles | 100 | 49 | .671 | – |
| Toronto Maple Leafs | 92 | 57 | .617 | 8 |
| Buffalo Bisons | 81 | 67 | .547 | 18.5 |
| Binghamton Bingoes | 75 | 71 | .514 | 23.5 |
| Newark Bears | 71 | 80 | .470 | 30 |
| Rochester Hustlers | 67 | 83 | .447 | 33.5 |
| Jersey City Skeeters | 56 | 93 | .376 | 44 |
| Reading Coal Barons | 51 | 93 | .354 | 46.5 |

== League Leaders ==
=== Batting leaders ===
| Stat | Player | Total |
|---|---|---|
| AVG | Otis Lawry, Baltimore Orioles | .364 |
| H | Merwin Jacobson, Baltimore Orioles | 203 |
| R | Fritz Maisel, Baltimore Orioles | 135 |
| 2B | Fritz Maisel, Baltimore Orioles | 44 |
| 3B | Joe Shannon, Binghamton Bingoes; Frank Wigglesworth, Jersey City Skeeters | 15 |
| HR | George Kelly, Rochester Hustlers | 15 |
| SB | Ed Miller, Newark Bears | 87 |

=== Pitching leaders ===
| Stat | Player | Total |
|---|---|---|
| W | Rube Parnham, Baltimore Orioles | 28 |
| L | Reid Zellars, Jersey City Skeeters | 23 |
| ERA | Rip Jordan, Buffalo Bisons | 1.43 |
| SO | Rube Parnham, Baltimore Orioles | 187 |

== See also ==
- 1919 Major League Baseball season
