= Archbold Stadium =

Former football stadium at Syracuse University

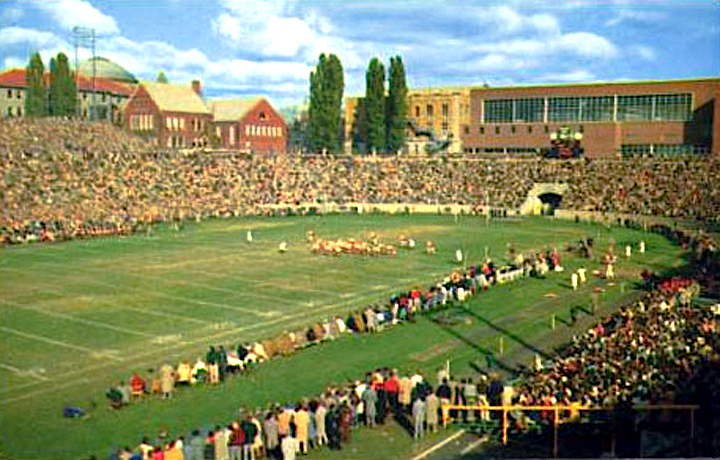
- Interactive map of Archbold Stadium
- Location: Irving Avenue; Syracuse, NY 13244
- Coordinates: 43°2′10″N 76°8′11″W
- Owner: Syracuse University
- Operator: Syracuse University
- Capacity: 30,000 (original); 40,001 (maximum); 26,000 (final)

Construction
- Groundbreaking: May 1, 1905
- Built: August 20, 1906
- Opened: September 25, 1907
- Closed: November 11, 1978
- Demolished: 1979
- Architects: Frederick Revels & Earl Hallenback
- Builders: Consolidated Engineering & Construction Company
- Project manager: Ivar Kreuger

Tenant
- 1907-1978 Syracuse Orangemen

Archbold Stadium was a multi-purpose stadium in Syracuse, New York. It opened in 1907 and was home to the Syracuse Orangemen (Note: The school did not adopt its current nickname of "Orange" until 2004.) football team prior to the opening of the Carrier Dome in 1980.

== History ==
After organizing athletics events at various Star Parks around the city, the university wanted the center of athletics on campus, and created the Old Oval. The athletics program quickly outgrew the multi-purpose field and the Oval was no longer considered a suitable location for such events.

The stadium was named for John D. Archbold, who donated $600,000 for the project. He was also responsible for funding towards the building of Archbold Gymnasium, located just to the east overlooking the stadium. The stadium was built entirely of concrete in the excavated hill side and seated over 25,000 spectators.

Ground broke on construction of the stadium after funding announcement on May 1, 1905. The Consolidated Engineering & Construction Company of New York City began construction in August 1906 and most work was done by June 1908. Upon its completion in 1907, Archbold Stadium was touted as the "Greatest Athletic Arena in America". The stadium displaced Harvard Stadium as the largest concrete stadium in the nation. At the time of its construction, it was one of only three concrete stadiums in the world.

In the first game played at the stadium on September 25, 1907, the Orangemen beat rival Hobart by a score of 28-0. Syracuse went 265-112-20 all-time (from 1907 until 1978), and at times were nearly unbeatable. From 1915 to 1927, Syracuse achieved a remarkable home record of 61-10-6. Then, during the 11-year stretch from 1958 to 1968, the Orangemen won 47 and lost only 6 games played at Archbold Stadium.

The stadium was occasionally used to stage Syracuse Stars minor league baseball games, such as in 1920 while the Stars were awaiting the completion of Star Park.

== Description ==
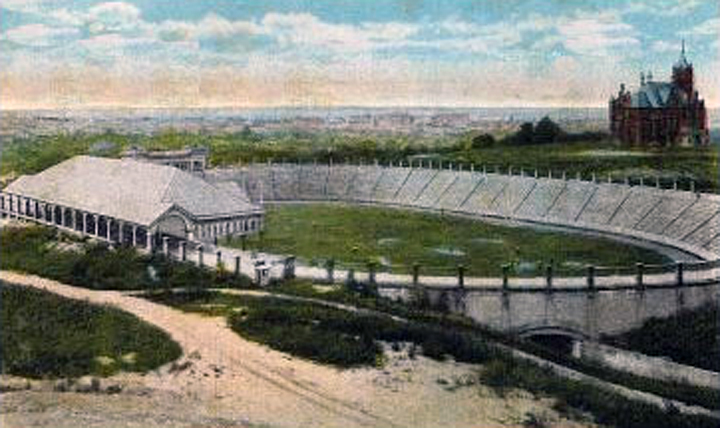
Archbold Stadium in 1919.

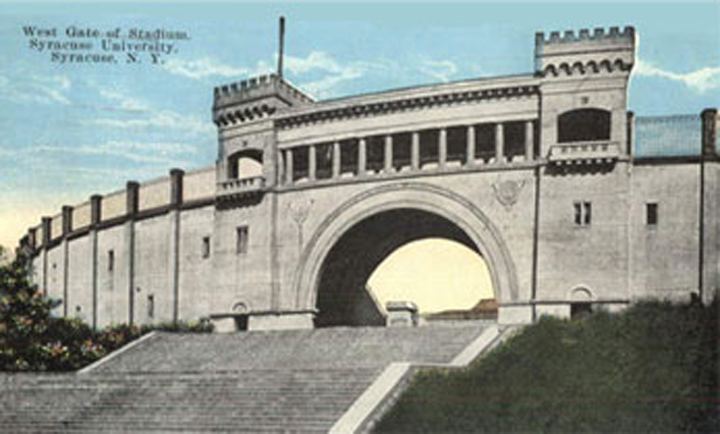
The Syracuse University - Archbold Stadium - West entrance - 1922

The stadium contained over 20,000 cubic yards of concrete over six acres, cost approximately $400,000 (≈$12 million in 2020 dollars) and was built in just over a year.

The 800' x 475' stadium was oval-shaped, with a track (originally dirt) and a natural grass football field. The west end zone, the stadium's main entrance, was marked by a grand castle-like façade with two turrets framing the gateway concrete arch. There was originally a wooden roof over the central section of the south grandstands for the reserved seating.

In the 1950s, the stadium was expanded to the north and south, bringing the capacity up to 40,000. However, by the 1970s, stricter fire codes forced a reduction in capacity to 26,000.

== Final years ==
Toward the end of the 1970s, Syracuse University was under pressure to improve its football facilities in order to remain a Division I-A football school. The stadium could not be expanded due to fire codes. It was closed following the 1978 season, and Syracuse University decided to build a new stadium on the former footprint of Archbold, which, appropriately for Syracuse's often cold weather, was to have a domed Teflon-coated, fiberglass inflatable roof. The new stadium was named Carrier Dome (now JMA Wireless Dome).

In the final game at Archbold Stadium, on November 11, 1978, the Orangemen defeated nationally ranked Navy, 20-17. A 2009 documentary titled Archbold Stadium: The Story of '78 captures the story of this game as told by the players, coaches, and fans.

Events and tenants
Preceded by Old Oval	Home of Syracuse Orange football 1905 – 1978	Succeeded by Carrier Dome
