= International League Hall of Fame =

- Established: 1947
- Dissolved: 2021
- Type: Professional sports hall of fame
- Website: Official website

The International League Hall of Fame was an American baseball hall of fame which honored players, managers, and executives of the International League (IL). It was created by the International League Baseball Writers' Association in 1947 to honor those individuals who made significant contributions to the league.

The Hall of Fame inducted its first class of nine former players, managers, and league officials in 1947. A plaque was unveiled at the IL's New York City offices located in the Ruppert Building at 535 Fifth Avenue. Unlike the Baseball Hall of Fame in Cooperstown the hall of fame did not have a permanent home, and only existed as a barnstorming display which visited a number of the league's ballparks each season.

From 1949 through 1960, the league inducted up to three new members each year. Only one member was inducted annually from 1961 to 1963. After the cessation of the league's Baseball Writers' Association, the Hall of Fame became dormant from 1964 to 2006. The Hall was reestablished in 2007 to commemorate the League's 125th season of play in 2008. Two new members were inducted in 2007, and plans were made to elect up to 28, 14, and 7 inductees, respectively, over the next three years. In the seasons that followed, up to three inductees were to be voted into the Hall annually. As of 2020, 129 individuals had been inducted into the International League Hall of Fame. Following the 2020 season, which was cancelled due to the COVID-19 pandemic before it began, Major League Baseball assumed control of Minor League Baseball. The Hall of Fame has since become dormant.

== Table key ==
†	Indicates a member of the National Baseball Hall of Fame and Museum
Year	Indicates the year of induction
Position(s)	Indicates the inductee's primary playing position(s) or association with the league

== Inductees ==
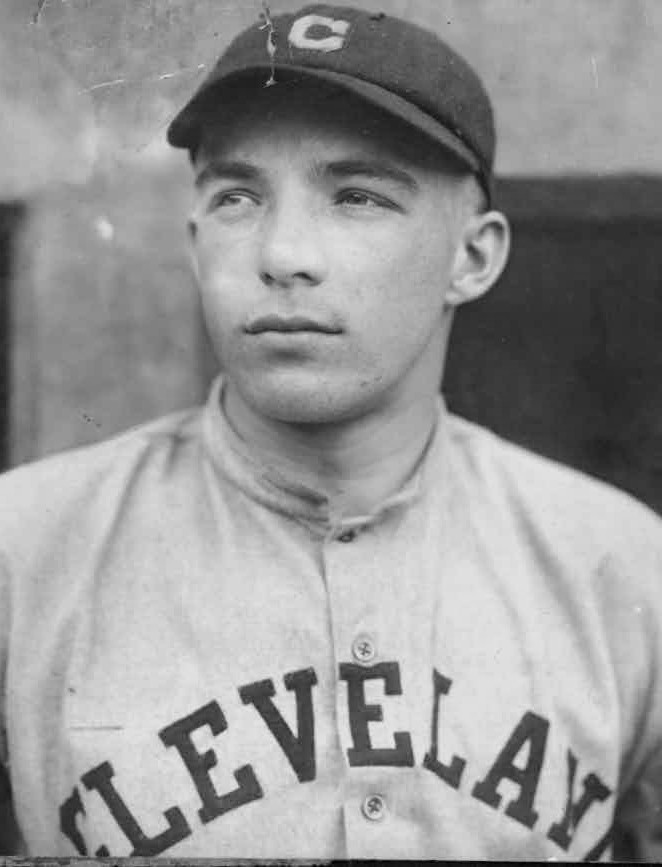
Billy Southworth led the Rochester Red Wings to four pennant-winning seasons.

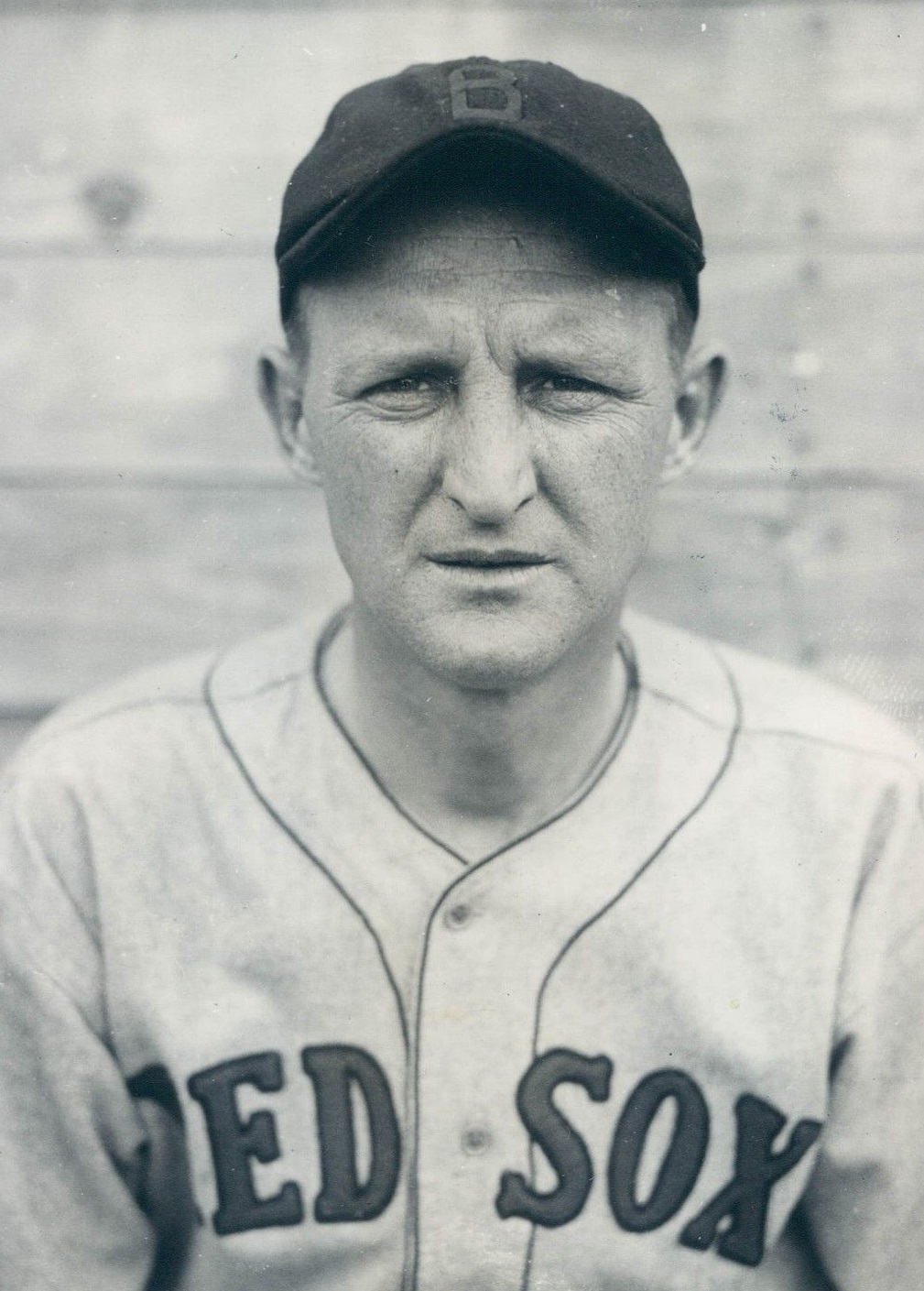
Herb Pennock was elected to the National Baseball Hall of Fame in 1948.

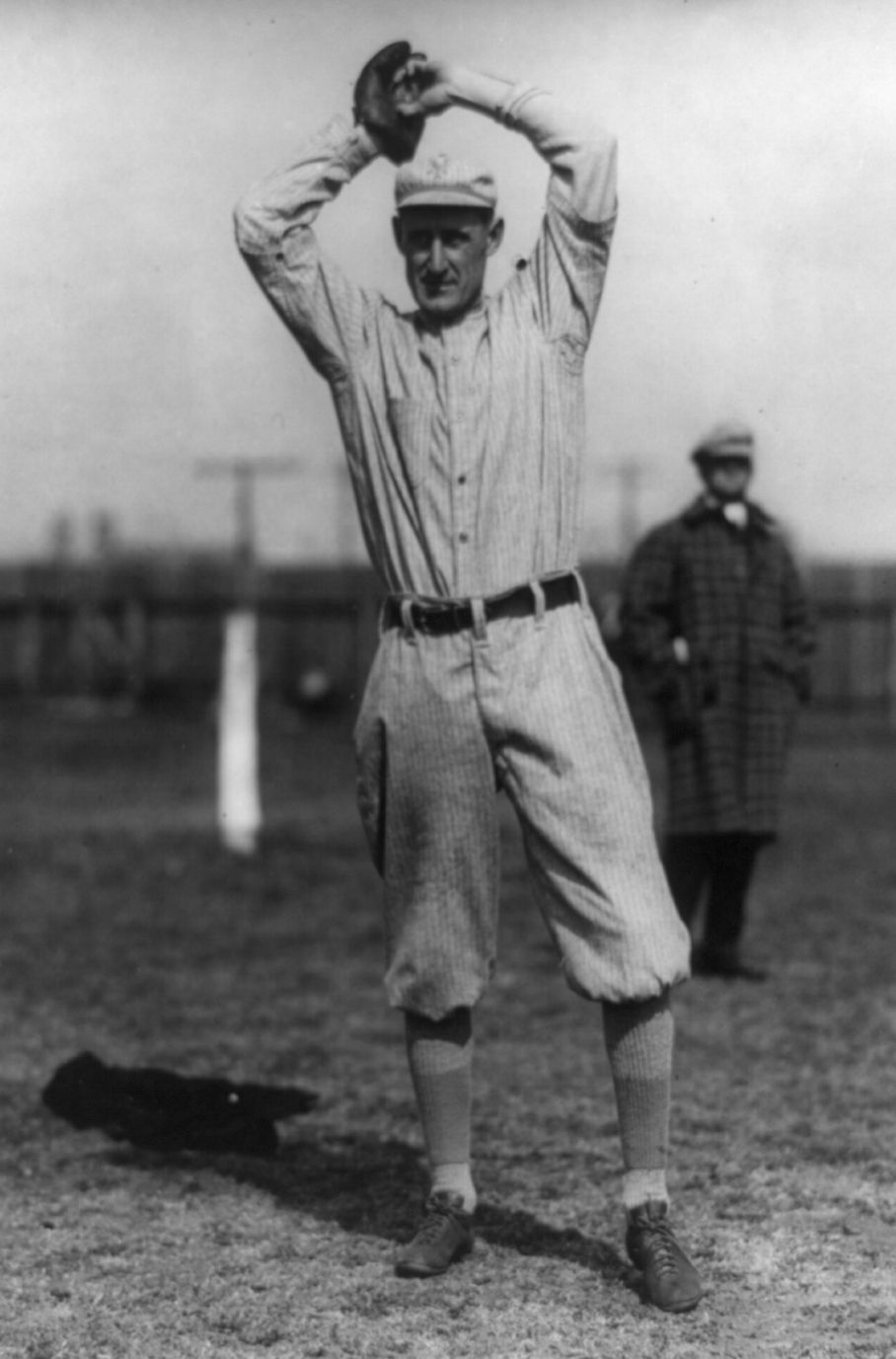
Hooks Wiltse managed the original Buffalo Bisons to six-straight winning seasons from 1919 to 1924.

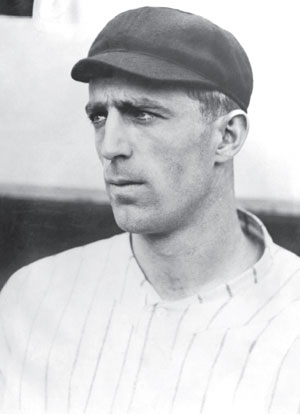
Fred Merkle's baserunning error in a 1908 game is infamously known as Merkle's Boner.

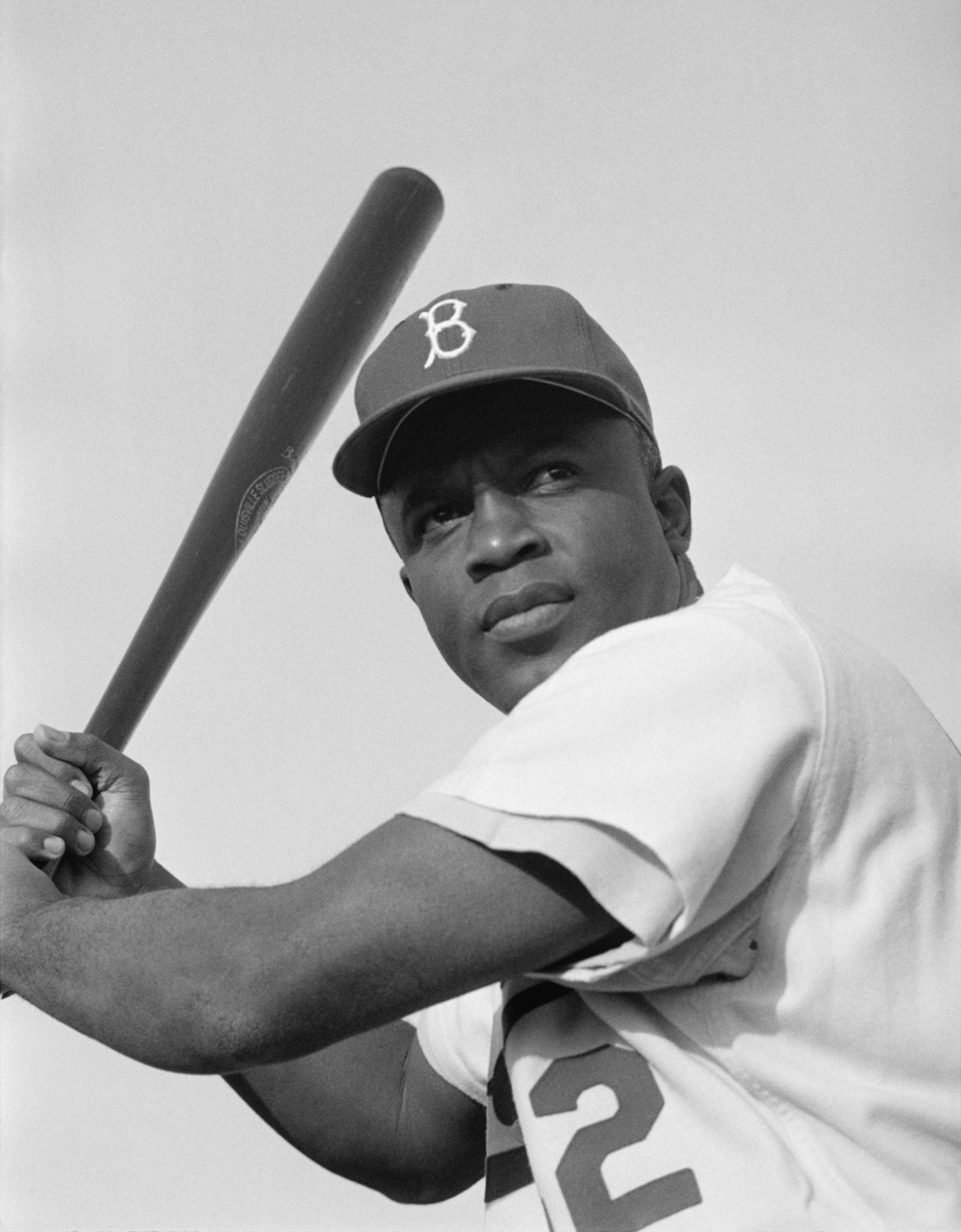
Jackie Robinson led the IL in batting average (.349) and runs scored (113) in 1946.

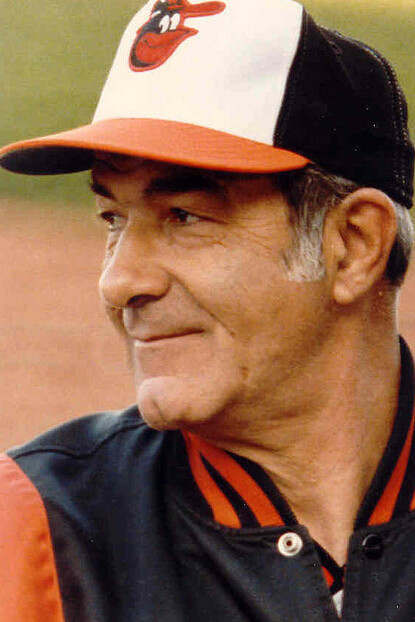
Joe Altobelli managed three Governors' Cup Champions and won the IL Manager of the Year Award in 1971, 1976, and 1980.

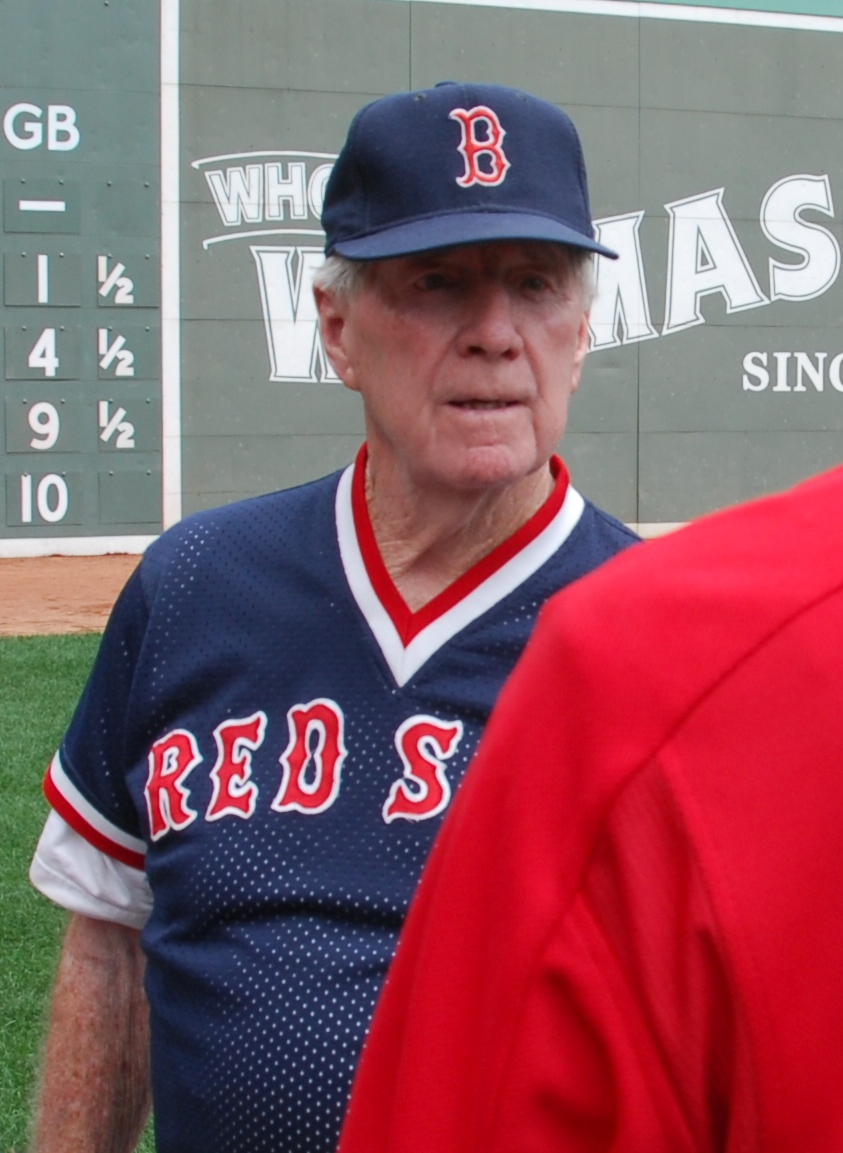
Joe Morgan won the 1964 IL Most Valuable Player Award and the IL Manager of the Year Award in 1973 and 1977.

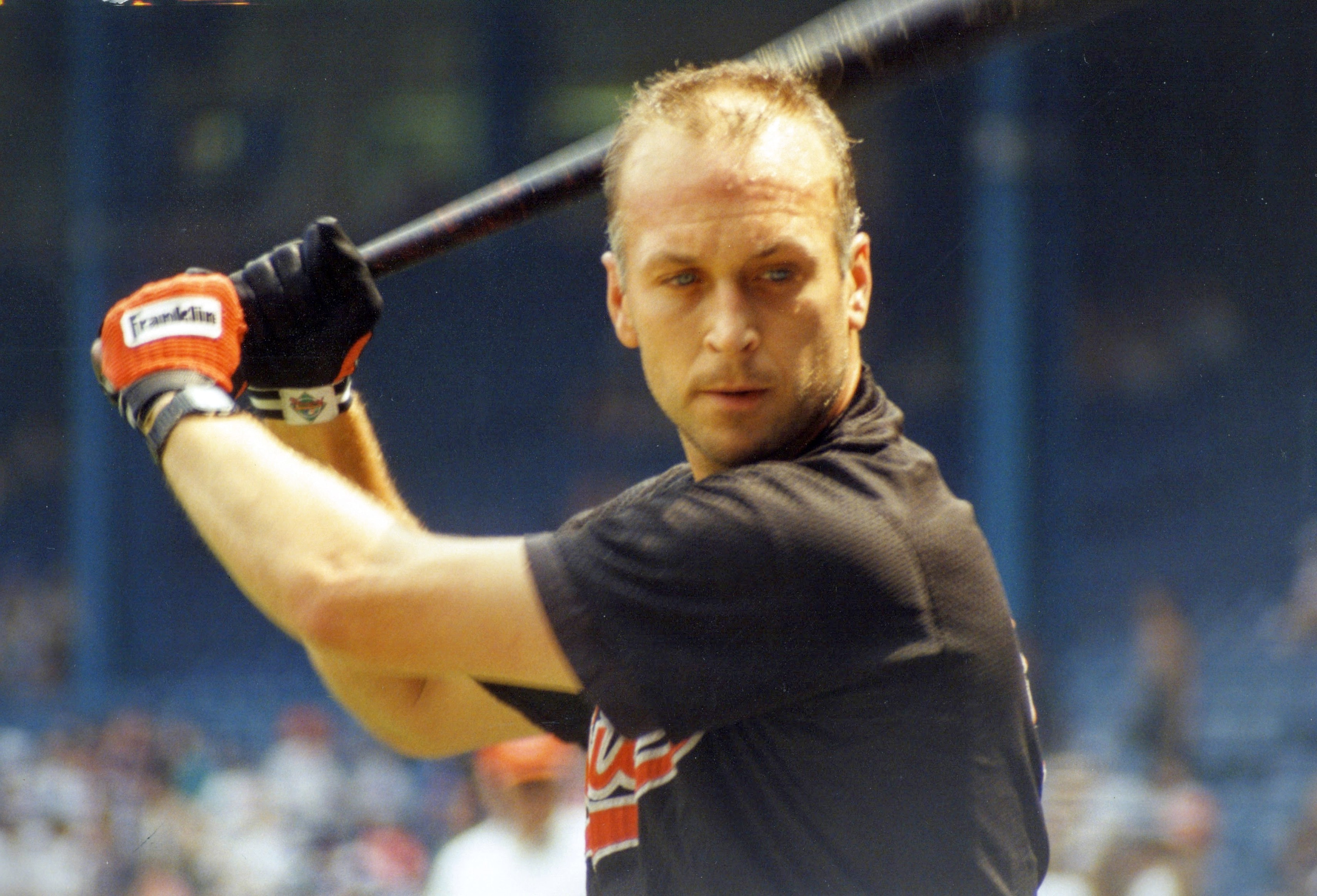
Cal Ripken Jr. won the 1981 IL Rookie of the Year Award and was named a postseason All-Star in his only season at the Triple-A level.

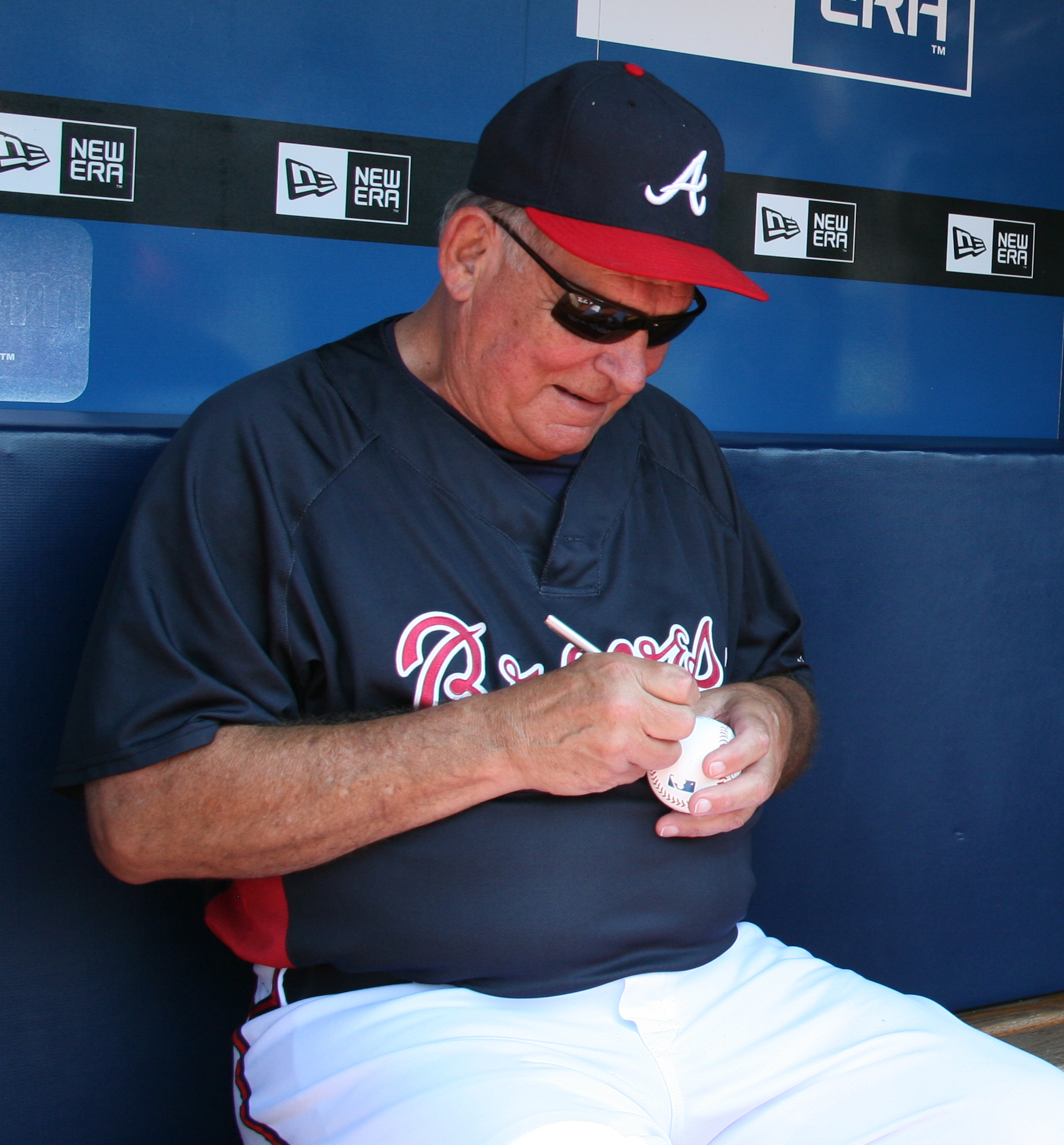
Bobby Cox was elected to the National Baseball Hall of Fame in 2014.

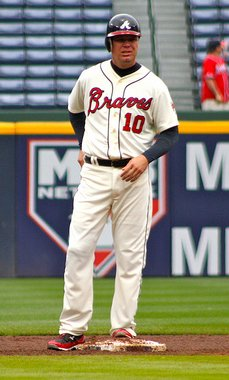
Chipper Jones was elected to the National Baseball Hall of Fame in 2018.

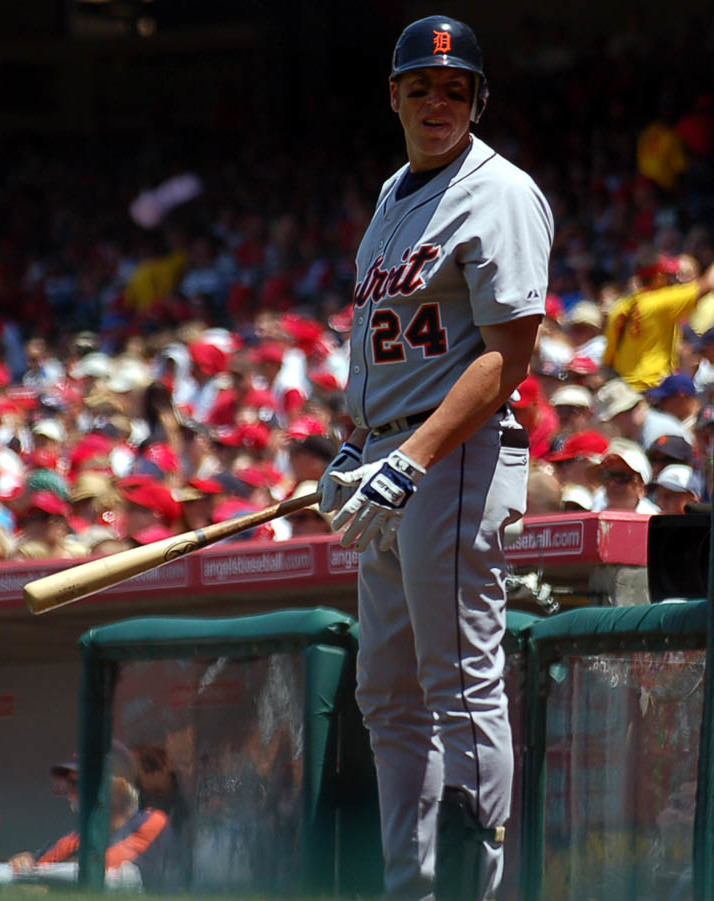
Mike Hessman International League and Minor League Baseball's all time home leader inducted in 2018.

Year	Name	Position(s)	Ref.
1947	Ollie Carnegie	Outfielder	
1947	Charlie Keller	Outfielder	
1947	Ernest Lanigan	Executive	
1947	Frank McGowan	Outfielder/Manager	
1947	Steve O'Neill	Catcher/Manager	
1947	Ben Sankey	Shortstop	
1947	Frank Shaughnessy	First baseman/Manager/Executive	
1947	Billy Southworth^{†}	Outfielder/Manager	
1947	Dixie Walker	Outfielder/Manager	
1948	Herb Pennock^{†}	Pitcher	
1948	Dick Rudolph	Pitcher	
1948	Tommy Thomas	Pitcher/Manager	
1949	Ed Holly	Shortstop/Manager	
1949	Billy Meyer	Manager	
1949	Specs Toporcer	Second baseman/Manager	
1950	Jack Dunn	Second baseman/Manager	
1950	Jewel Ens	Third baseman/Manager	
1950	Dan Howley	Catcher/Manager	
1951	Ripper Collins	First baseman	
1951	Al Mamaux	Pitcher/Manager	
1951	Eddie Onslow	First baseman/Manager	
1952	Bill Murray	Outfielder/Manager	
1952	Jack Ogden	Pitcher	
1952	Hooks Wiltse	Pitcher/First baseman/Manager	
1953	Estel Crabtree	Outfielder/Manager	
1953	William Manley	Executive	
1953	Fred Merkle	First baseman/Manager	
1954	Joe Boley	Shortstop	
1954	Fred Hutchinson	Pitcher	
1954	Bill Kelly	First baseman/Manager/Umpire	
1955	Jack Berly	Pitcher	
1955	Luke Hamlin	Pitcher	
1955	Merwin Jacobson	Outfielder	
1956	George Earnshaw	Pitcher	
1956	Joe McCarthy^{†}	Second baseman	
1956	Jimmy Ripple	Outfielder	
1957	Bruno Betzel	Manager	
1957	Ike Boone	Outfielder/Manager	
1957	Rube Parnham	Pitcher	
1958	Jack Bentley	First baseman/Pitcher	
1958	George Selkirk	Outfielder/Manager	
1958	Jimmy Walsh	Outfielder/Manager	
1959	Fritz Maisel	Third baseman/Manager	
1959	Harry Smythe	Pitcher/Manager	
1959	George Stallings	Catcher/Manager	
1960	Howie Moss	Outfielder/Third baseman	
1960	Rocky Nelson	First baseman	
1960	Jackie Robinson^{†}	Second baseman	
1961	Patrick T. Powers	Manager/Executive	
1962	Joe Brown	Third baseman	
1963	Dick Porter	Outfielder/Second baseman/Manager	
2007	Harold Cooper	Executive	
2007	George Sisler Jr.	Executive	
2008	Tommie Aaron	Third baseman/Manager	
2008	Dale Alexander	First baseman	
2008	Joe Altobelli	First baseman/Manager/Executive	
2008	Don Buford	Third baseman	
2008	Gene Cook	Executive	
2008	Russ Derry	Outfielder	
2008	Luke Easter	First baseman	
2008	Ralph Garr	Outfielder	
2008	Frank Gilhooley	Outfielder/Manager	
2008	Lefty Grove^{†}	Pitcher	
2008	Joe Hauser	First baseman	
2008	Pancho Herrera	First baseman	
2008	Tommy Lasorda^{†}	Pitcher	
2008	Ben Mondor	Executive	
2008	Joe Morgan	Infielder/Manager	
2008	George Puccinelli	Outfielder	
2008	George Quellich	Outfielder	
2008	Jim Rice^{†}	Outfielder	
2008	Dave Rosenfield	Executive	
2008	Hank Sauer	First baseman/Outfielder	
2008	Morrie Silver	Executive	
2008	Tex Simone	Executive	
2008	Bobby Tiefenauer	Pitcher	
2008	Ollie Tucker	Outfielder	
2008	Frank Verdi	Infielder/Manager	
2008	Rabbit Whitman	Outfielder	
2008	Archie Wilson	Outfielder	
2009	Buzz Arlett	Outfielder	
2009	Red Barrett	Pitcher	
2009	Walter Cazen	Outfielder	
2009	Steve Demeter	Third baseman/Manager	
2009	Clay Hopper	Manager	
2009	Rube Kisinger	Pitcher	
2009	Joe Knight	Outfielder	
2009	Dutch Mele	Outfielder	
2009	Stump Merrill	Manager	
2009	Roberto Petagine	First baseman	
2009	Red Schoendienst^{†}	Shortstop	
2009	Bill Short	Pitcher	
2009	Ed Stevens	First baseman	
2009	Harry Walker	Outfielder/Manager	
2010	Walter Alston^{†}	Infielder/Manager	
2010	Don Baylor	Outfielder	
2010	Frank Carswell	Outfielder/Manager	
2010	Bobby Grich	Shortstop/Second baseman	
2010	Mike Ryba	Pitcher	
2010	Bob Seeds	Outfielder	
2010	Coaker Triplett	Outfielder/Manager	
2011	Steve Balboni	First baseman	
2011	Wade Boggs^{†}	Third baseman	
2011	Cal Ripken Jr.^{†}	Third baseman	
2012	Dave Eiland	Pitcher/Coach	
2012	Bill Evers	Manager	
2012	Mike Tamburro	Executive	
2013	Mack Jones	Outfielder	
2013	Larry Parrish	Manager	
2013	Don Richmond	Third baseman	
2014	Jeff Manto	Third baseman/First baseman/Outfielder	
2014	Dave Miley	Manager	
2014	Jim Weber	Broadcaster	
2015	Marc Bombard	Manager	
2015	Marshall Brant	First baseman	
2015	Don Labbruzzo	Executive	
2016	Hensley Meulens	Third baseman/Outfielder	
2016	Charlie Montoyo	Manager	
2017	Lee Gardner	Pitcher	
2017	Max Schumacher	Executive	
2018	Mike Hessman	Third baseman	
2018	Ken Schnacke	Executive	
2019	Bobby Cox^{†}	Third baseman/Manager	
2019	Sam Jethroe	Outfielder	
2019	Billy McMillon	Outfielder	
2019	Lou Schwechheimer	Executive	
2020	Chipper Jones^{†}	Shortstop	
2020	Chad Mottola	Outfielder	
2020	Johnny Neun	First baseman/Manager	

== See also ==
- International League baseball awards
- Pacific Coast League Hall of Fame
