= Newell Park =

Baseball park in Syracuse, New York

- Star Park (I)
- Interactive map of Newell Park
- Location: Syracuse, New York
- Coordinates: 43°02′06″N 76°08′54″W
- Surface: grass

Tenant
- Syracuse Stars (NL) (1879)

Newell Park was a baseball playing field located in Syracuse, New York. The ground was home to the Syracuse Stars of the National League for the 1879 season. Historians also refer to it as Star Park (I). It had been opened in 1878 for minor league ball. The 1879 major league team played poorly and drew poorly, and folded in early September. A revived Syracuse Stars played here in 1883 and 1884 before moving to a new Star Park a couple of long blocks north of Newell Park on Salina Street.

The location of Newell Park was the southeast corner of East Raynor Street (originally Croton Street) and South Salina Street, extending east toward Montgomery Street and State Street, and about one half-mile west of the Carrier Dome at Syracuse University.

== See also ==
- MacArthur Stadium
- Star Park
