= Virgil Barnes =

American baseball player

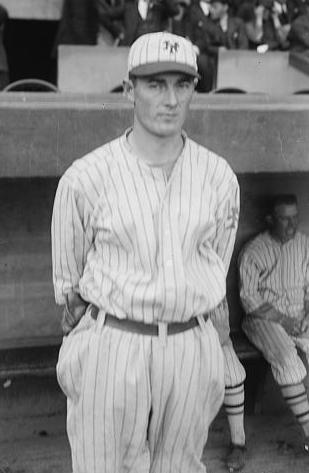
- Pitcher
- Born: March 5, 1897; Ontario, Kansas, U.S.
- Died: July 24, 1958 (aged 61); Wichita, Kansas, U.S.
- Batted: Right Threw: Right

MLB debut
- September 25, 1919, for the New York Giants

Last MLB appearance
- September 15, 1928, for the Boston Braves

MLB statistics
- Win–loss record: 61–59
- Earned run average: 3.66
- Strikeouts: 275
- Stats at Baseball Reference

Teams
- New York Giants (1919–1928); Boston Braves (1928)

Virgil Jennings Barnes (March 5, 1897 – July 24, 1958) was an American professional baseball player who was a pitcher in the Major Leagues from 1919 to 1928. He played for the New York Giants from 1919 to 1928, and also played for the Boston Braves in 1928 after being traded to the Braves in mid-season. His brother Jesse also pitched in the major leagues and was Virgil's teammate on the Giants from 1919 through 1923. On September 24, 1922, St. Louis Cardinals outfielder Rogers Hornsby hit two home runs, one off each brother, when both were pitching for the Giants.
