= George Quellich =

American baseball player (1903–1958)

- Outfielder
- Born: February 10, 1903; Johnsville, California, U.S.
- Died: August 31, 1958 (aged 55); Johnsville, California, U.S.
- Batted: Right Threw: Right

MLB debut
- August 1, 1931, for the Detroit Tigers

Last MLB appearance
- August 16, 1931, for the Detroit Tigers

MLB statistics
- Batting average: .222
- Home runs: 1
- Runs batted in: 11
- Stats at Baseball Reference

Teams
- Detroit Tigers (1931)

George William Quellich (February 10, 1903 – August 31, 1958) was an American Major League Baseball player. Quellich played for the Detroit Tigers in 1931. He batted and threw right-handed.

Quellich is a member of the International League Hall of Fame.

He was born in and died in Johnsville, California.
