= Maurice Archdeacon =

American baseball player (1898–1954)

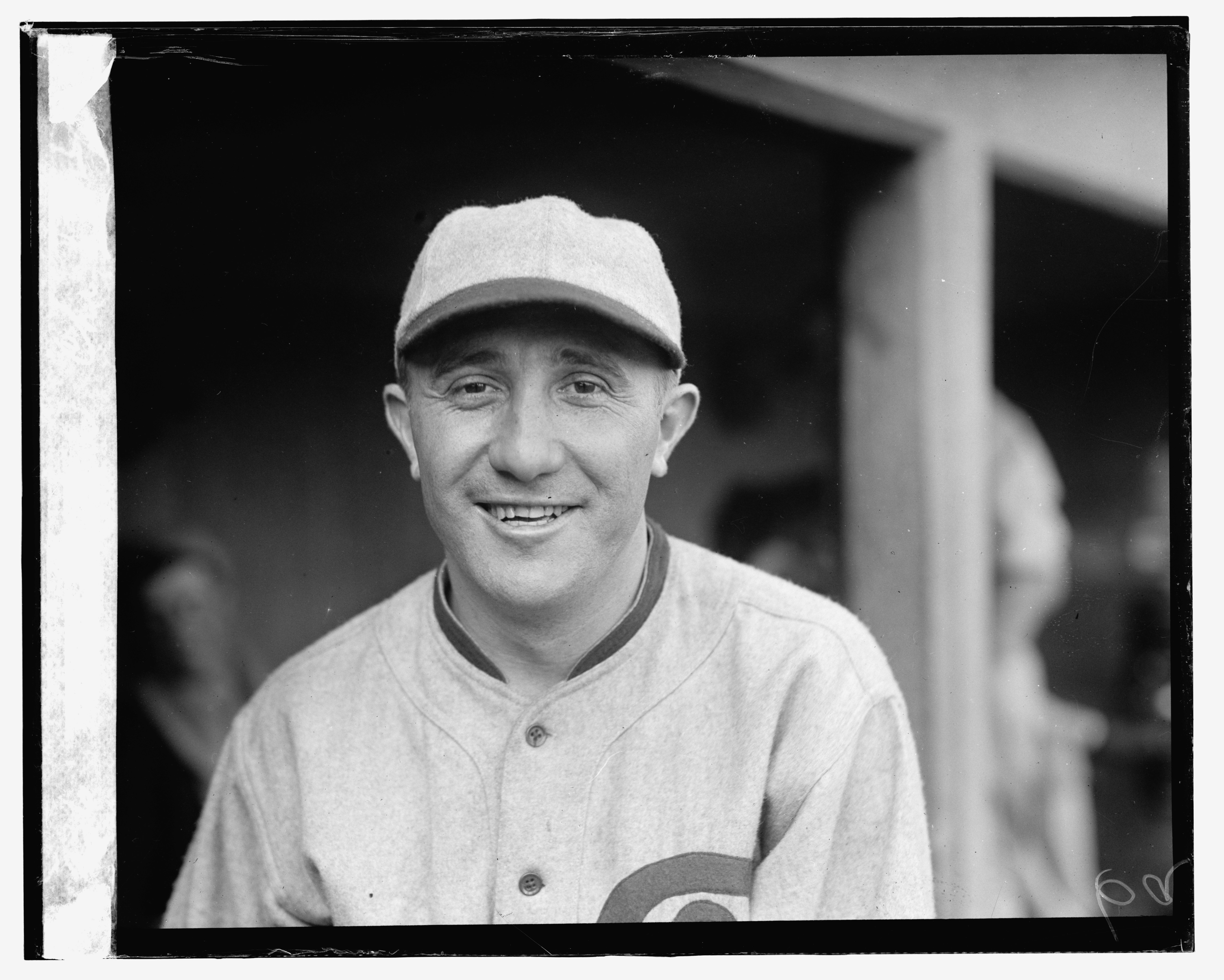
- Center fielder
- Born: December 14, 1898; St. Louis, Missouri, U.S.
- Died: September 5, 1954 (aged 55); St. Louis, Missouri, U.S.
- Batted: Left Threw: Left

MLB debut
- September 17, 1923, for the Chicago White Sox

Last MLB appearance
- May 29, 1925, for the Chicago White Sox

MLB statistics
- Batting average: .333
- Runs: 84
- Runs batted in: 29
- Stats at Baseball Reference

Teams
- Chicago White Sox (1923–1925)

Maurice John Archdeacon (December 14, 1898 – September 5, 1954), nicknamed "Flash", was an American Major League Baseball center fielder who played for the Chicago White Sox from 1923 to 1925. He stood 5'8" and weighed 153 lb.

Archdeacon had two nicknames, "Flash" and "Comet". While a player for Rochester of the International League in 1921, he set a speed record by circling the bases in 13.4 seconds during a pre-game exhibition (the record was broken by Evar Swanson in 1932). He was purchased for $50,000 by the White Sox from Rochester on September 13, 1923, after having stolen 225 bases in his last five minor league seasons.

He made his major league debut four days later against the Boston Red Sox at Fenway Park. Archdeacon went on to hit .402 in 22 games for Chicago that year by getting 35 hits in 87 at bats. He drove in four runs and scored 23.

Archdeacon played in 95 games for the last-place White Sox in 1924, batting .319 with 25 RBI, 59 runs scored, and 11 stolen bases. In 1925 he played in only 10 big league games, the last being on May 29. He was 1-for-9 with two runs scored.

His career totals include 127 games played, 128 hits, zero home runs, 29 RBI, 84 runs, and a lifetime batting average of .333. He drew 48 walks and was hit by pitches four times, giving him an on-base percentage of .413. He stole 13 bases and was caught 10 times.

Archdeacon was a longtime scout for the St. Louis Browns until they moved to Baltimore and became the Orioles in October, 1953.

He died in his hometown of St. Louis, Missouri, at the age of 55.
