= Otis Lawry =

American baseball player (1893-1965)

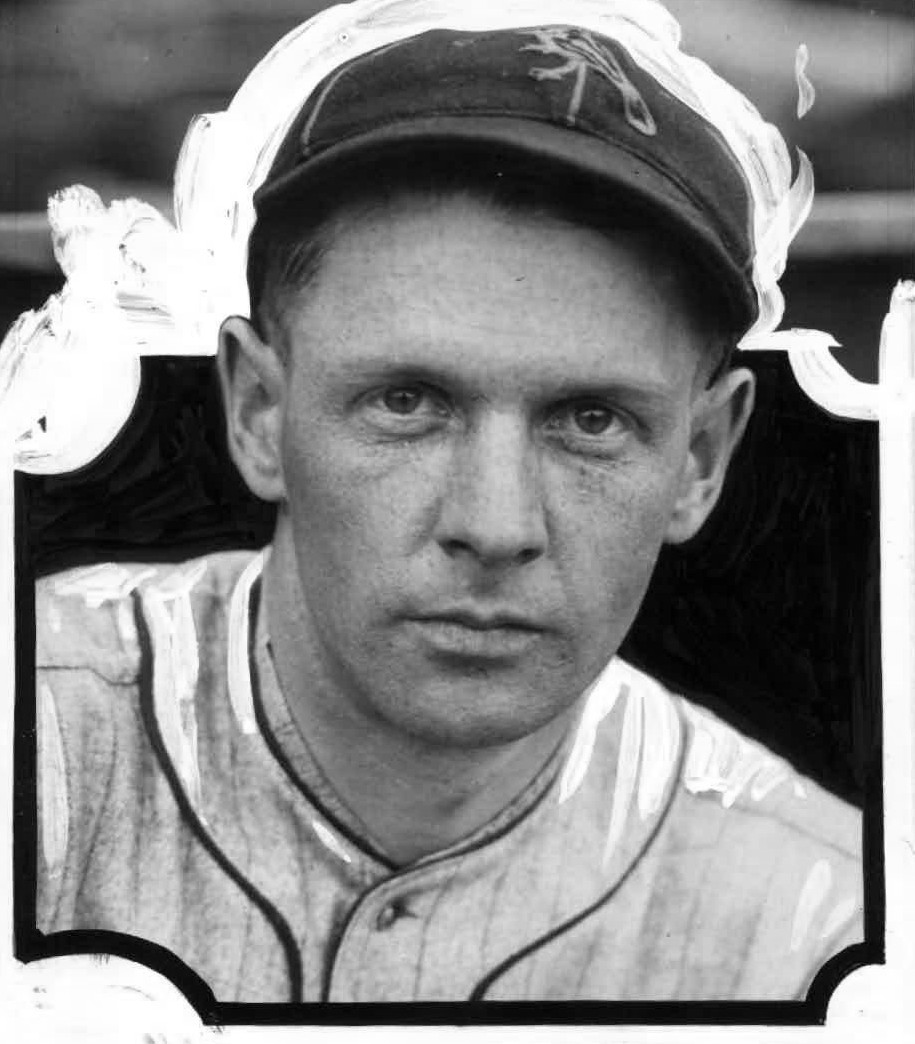
- Second baseman / Outfielder
- Born: November 1, 1893; Fairfield, Maine, U.S.
- Died: October 23, 1965 (aged 71); China, Maine, U.S.
- Batted: Left Threw: Right

MLB debut
- June 28, 1916, for the Philadelphia Athletics

Last MLB appearance
- September 29, 1917, for the Chicago White Sox

MLB statistics
- Games: 71
- Batting average: .191
- Hits: 34
- Runs Batted In: 5
- Stats at Baseball Reference

Teams
- Philadelphia Athletics (1916–1917)

Otis Carroll Lawry (November 1, 1893 – October 23, 1965) was an American professional baseball infielder with the Philadelphia Athletics of Major League Baseball. Nicknamed "Rabbit", he played in MLB during World War I from 1916 to 1917. Lawry was born in Fairfield, Maine, and died in China, Maine. He is buried in Maplewood Cemetery in Fairfield. Lawry attended the University of Maine, where he played college baseball for the Black Bears from 1914 to 1916.
