= Al Mamaux =

American baseball player (1894–1962)

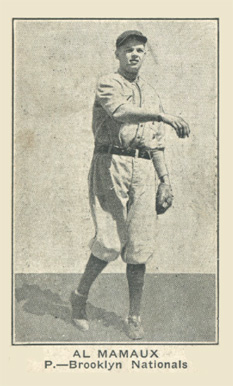
- Pitcher
- Born: May 30, 1894; Pittsburgh, Pennsylvania, U.S.
- Died: December 31, 1962 (aged 68); Santa Monica, California, U.S.
- Batted: Right Threw: Right

MLB debut
- September 23, 1913, for the Pittsburgh Pirates

Last MLB appearance
- September 2, 1924, for the New York Yankees

MLB statistics
- Win–loss record: 76–67
- Earned run average: 2.90
- Strikeouts: 625
- Stats at Baseball Reference

Teams
- Pittsburgh Pirates (1913–1917); Brooklyn Robins (1918–1923); New York Yankees (1924)

Albert Leon Mamaux (May 30, 1894 – December 31, 1962) was an American professional baseball player and manager.

== Biography ==
A right-handed pitcher over parts of twelve seasons (1913–1924), Mamaux played mainly with the Pittsburgh Pirates and Brooklyn Robins. He led Pittsburgh with 21 wins in 1915 and 1916. During his career, he compiled a 76–67 with a 2.90 ERA. Mamaux played on one National League pennant winner, the Robins, in 1920. He pitched four innings in the 1920 World Series for Brooklyn.

In 1924, he starred in the George M. Cohan musical, "Mary," at the Academy of Music. Mamaux's wife was also a member of the cast.

From 1926 to 1933, Mamaux pitched for the Newark Bears of the International League. During the 1930 season, he replaced Tris Speaker as team manager, and in 1932 led the Bears to the league title. The 1932 team, which featured 15 former and future New York Yankees, had a record of 109–59 and is regarded as one of the best minor league teams in history. Mamaux also coached the Albany Senators from 1935 to 1936 and the Seton Hall Pirates baseball team from 1937 to 1942.

Mamaux, who was born in Pittsburgh, attended Duquesne University. He died in Santa Monica, California.
