= Bill Kelly (first baseman) =

American baseball player (1898-1990)

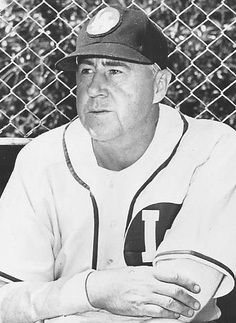
- Kelly, circa 1947
- First baseman
- Born: December 28, 1898; Syracuse, New York, U.S.
- Died: April 8, 1990 (aged 91); Syracuse, New York, U.S.
- Batted: Right Threw: Right

MLB debut
- September 6, 1920, for the Philadelphia Athletics

Last MLB appearance
- May 12, 1928, for the Philadelphia Phillies

MLB statistics
- Batting average: .179
- Home runs: 0
- Runs batted in: 5
- Stats at Baseball Reference

Teams
- Philadelphia Athletics (1920); Philadelphia Phillies (1928)

William Henry Kelly (December 28, 1898 – April 8, 1990) was an American first baseman and scout in Major League Baseball, and a star power-hitter, umpire and manager in minor league baseball. The native of Syracuse, New York, threw and batted right-handed, stood 6' (183 cm) tall and weighed 190 pounds (86 kg) as a player.

Kelly played only 32 games at the major league level for the 1920 Philadelphia Athletics and the 1928 Philadelphia Phillies, hitting only .179 in 84 at bats with no home runs and five runs batted in. But in between, he led the top-level International League in RBI for three consecutive seasons (1924–26) while he played for the Buffalo Bisons, racking up 155, 125 and 151 RBI in that span. He also led the IL in homers in 1924 (with 28) and 1926 (with 44). As a minor leaguer from 1921 to 1931, Kelly batted .308 and slugged 207 home runs.

In 1932, he began his umpiring career in the higher minors, eventually working in all three top-level minor leagues through 1941. After World War II, he moved into the dugout as a manager in the Chicago Cubs farm system, piloting top-level farm teams with the Los Angeles Angels of the Pacific Coast League (1947–50) and the Springfield Cubs of the International League (1951–52). His 1947 Angels won the regular-season and playoff PCL titles. After hanging up his uniform in 1954, Kelly scouted for the Cubs, Phillies and New York Mets through 1974 and his retirement.

Kelly died in his home city of Syracuse at the age of 91. He was elected to the International League Hall of Fame in 1954.
