= Jack Bentley (baseball) =

American baseball player (1895-1969)

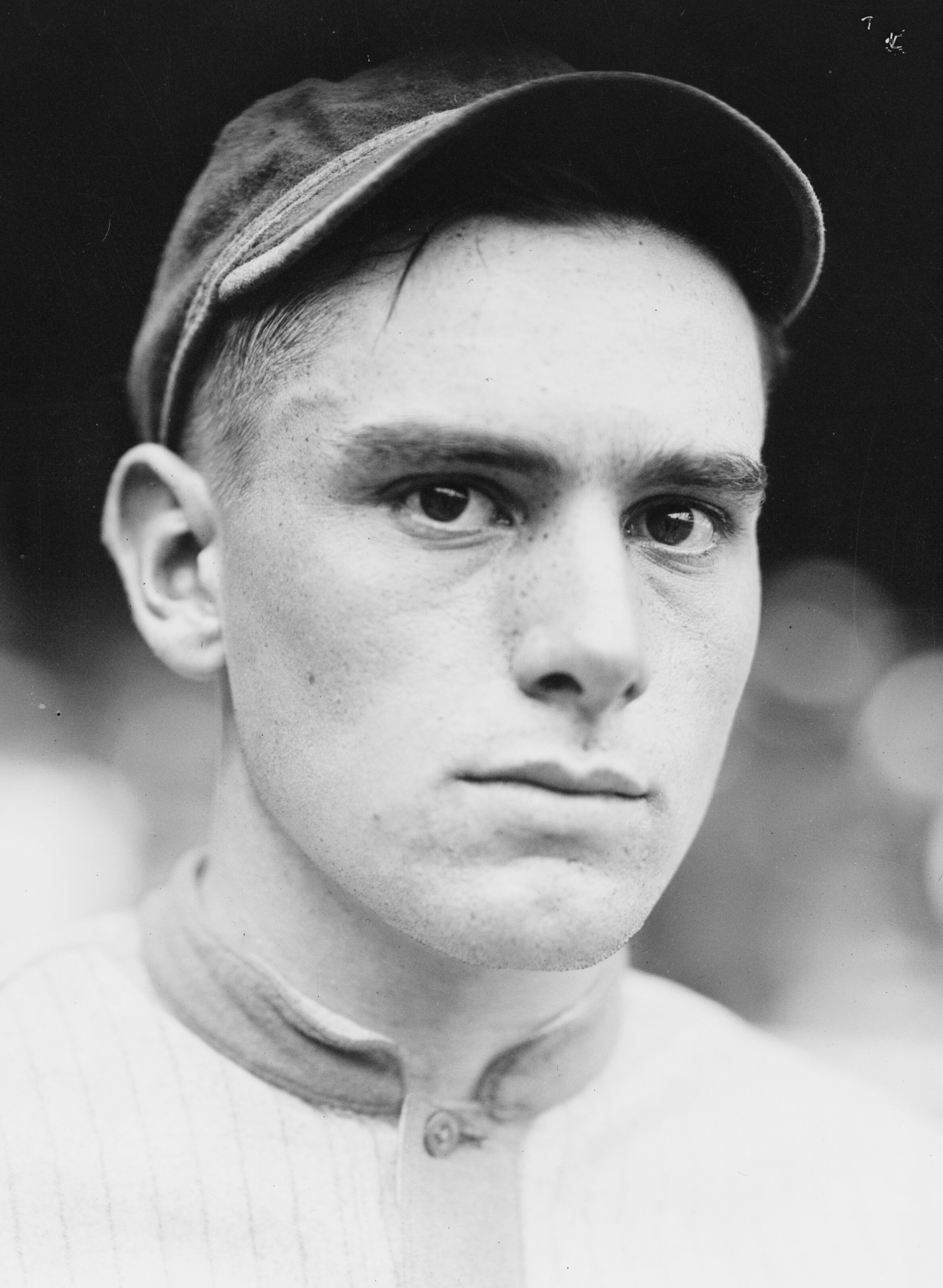
- Bentley in 1914
- Pitcher
- Born: March 8, 1895; Sandy Spring, Maryland, U.S.
- Died: October 24, 1969 (aged 74); Olney, Maryland, U.S.
- Batted: Left Threw: Left

MLB debut
- September 6, 1913, for the Washington Senators

Last MLB appearance
- May 20, 1927, for the New York Giants

MLB statistics
- Win–loss record: 46–33
- Earned run average: 4.01
- Strikeouts: 259
- Stats at Baseball Reference

Teams
- Washington Senators (1913–1916); New York Giants (1923–1925); Philadelphia Phillies (1926); New York Giants (1926–1927)

John "Needles" Bentley (March 8, 1895 – October 24, 1969) was an American professional baseball player. He was a left-handed pitcher over parts of nine seasons (1913–1916, 1923–1927) with the Washington Senators, New York Giants and Philadelphia Phillies. For his career, he compiled a 46–33 record in 138 appearances, with a 4.01 ERA (earned run average) and 259 strikeouts. Bentley was a member of the Giants' pennant-winning teams in 1923 and 1924. He was 1–3 with a 4.94 ERA and 11 strikeouts in World Series play.

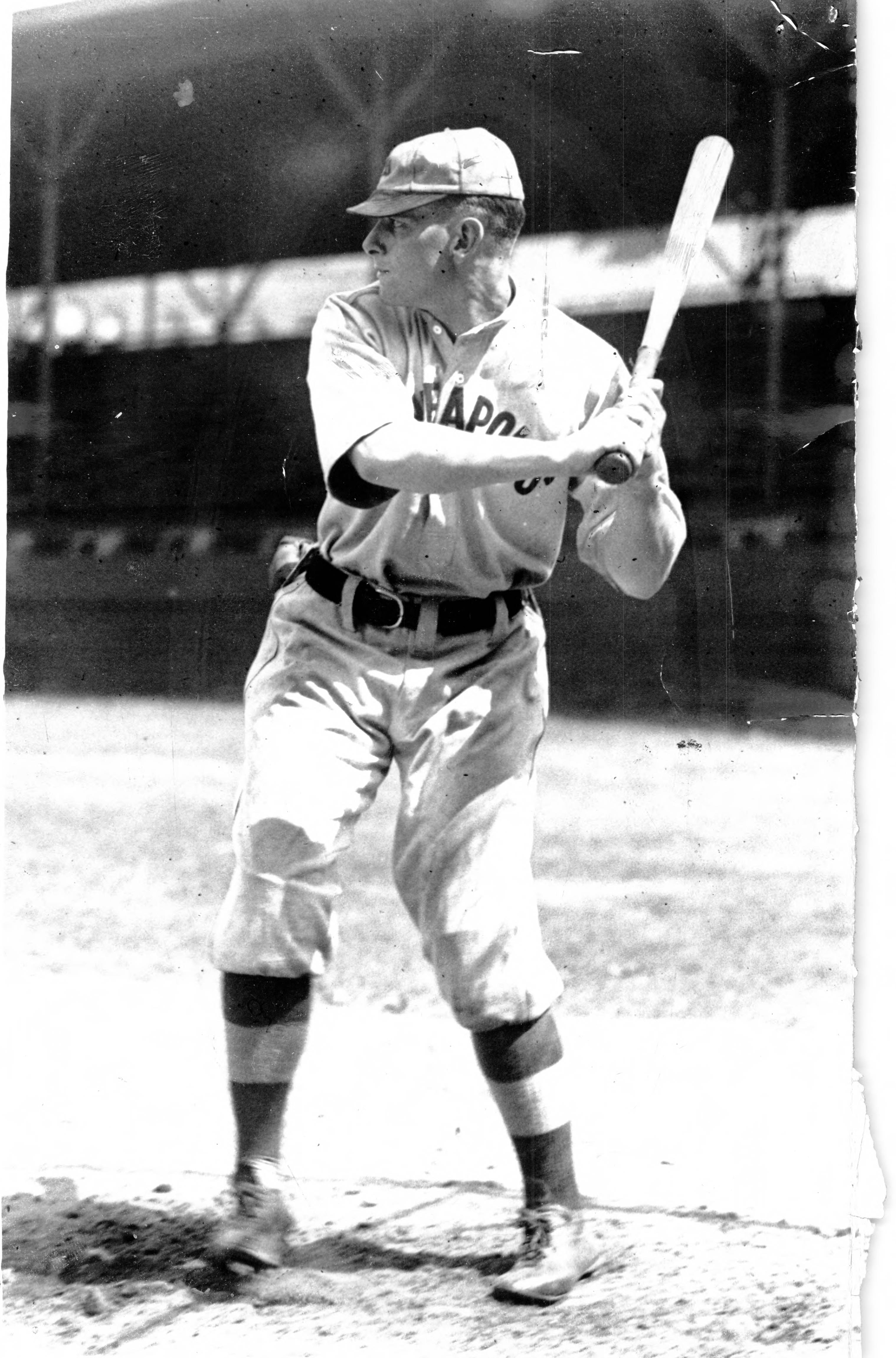
The Senators sent Bentley to play for the minor league Minneapolis Millers briefly in 1915-16.

He was a good hitting pitcher in his major league career. In nine seasons, he compiled a .291 average (170-584) with 7 home runs and 71 RBI. In 1923 Bentley batted .427 (38-89) for the New York Giants. In the 1923 and 1924 World Series, he hit .417 (5-12) with one home run and 2 RBI. He would be the last pitcher to pinch-hit in the World Series until Zack Greinke, who pinch-hit in the 2021 World Series. He also played 59 games at first base and 3 games in right field in the majors.

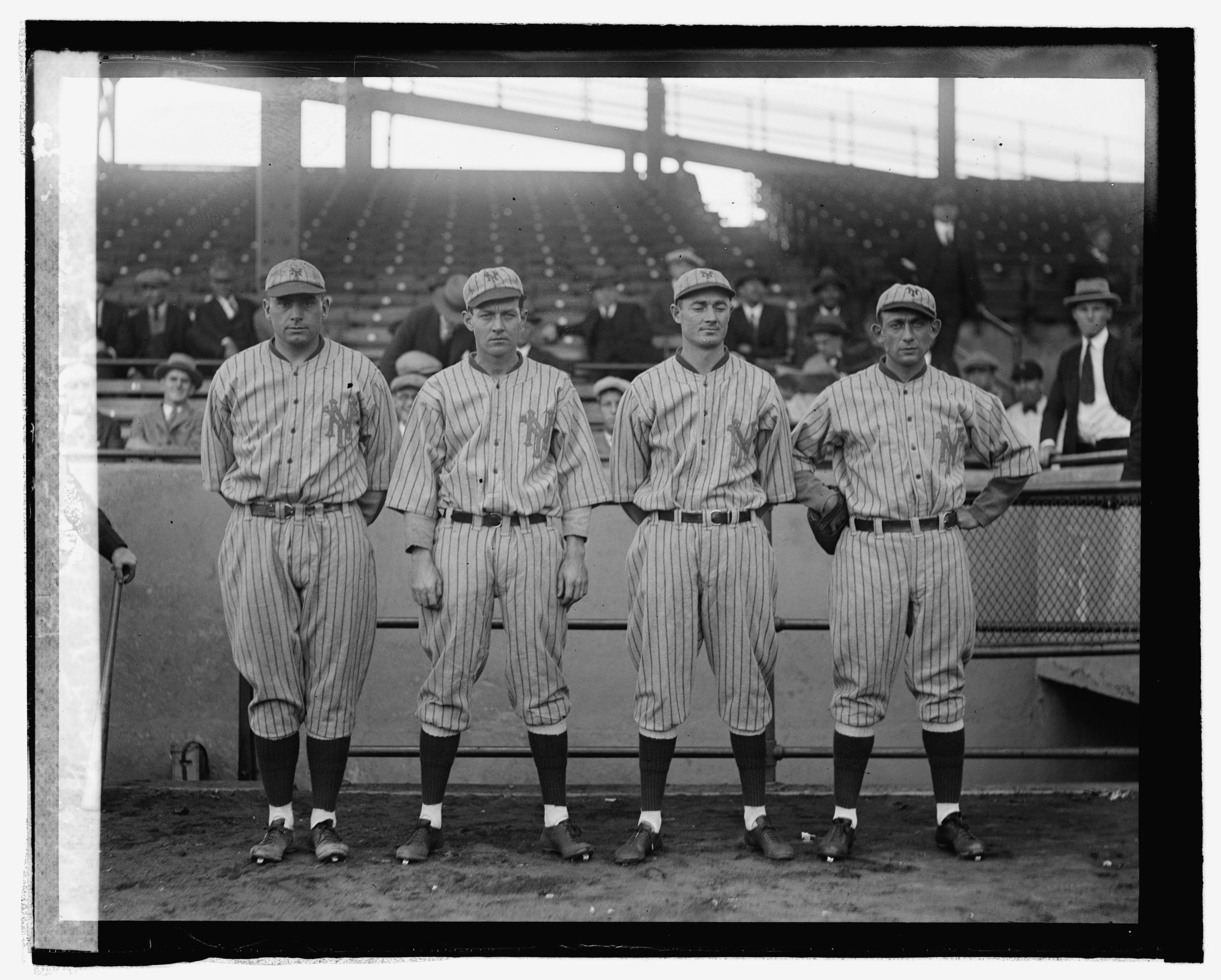
Bentley (left

In 1922, Bentley pitched for the minor league Baltimore Orioles in the International League, going 13–2 with a 1.73 ERA before he was called up again to the Big Leagues by the New York Giants.

He was born in Sandy Spring, Maryland, and later died in Olney, Maryland, at the age of 74.

Bentley was drafted into the military in July 1917. It was thought that he would claim exemption from military service as a conscientious objector due to his religious faith, yet he chose to enlist in the army and serve his country in World War I. In March 1918, Bentley was stationed at Fort Meade, Maryland. Shortly thereafter, he was deployed to France with the 313th Infantry. He documented his experiences through letters sent home throughout his 19 months of service.

== See also ==
- List of Major League Baseball annual saves leaders
