= Jack Ogden (baseball) =

American baseball player (1897–1977)

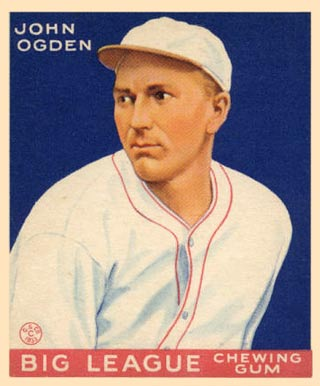
- Jack Ogden 1933 Goudey baseball card
- Pitcher
- Born: November 5, 1897; Ogden, Pennsylvania, U.S.
- Died: November 9, 1977 (aged 80); Wynnewood, Pennsylvania, U.S.
- Batted: Right Threw: Right

MLB debut
- June 22, 1918, for the New York Giants

Last MLB appearance
- September 9, 1932, for the Cincinnati Reds

MLB statistics
- Win–loss record: 25–34
- Strikeouts: 144
- Earned run average: 4.24
- Stats at Baseball Reference

Teams
- New York Giants (1918); St. Louis Browns (1928–1929); Cincinnati Reds (1931–1932)

John Mahlon Ogden (November 5, 1897 – November 9, 1977) was an American Major League Baseball pitcher. He played five seasons in the majors, between 1918 and 1932, for the Cincinnati Reds, New York Giants, and St. Louis Browns. He played several seasons with the then minor league Baltimore Orioles, became a baseball executive and a scout after his retirement and is a member of the International League Hall of Fame.

== Early life and education ==
Ogden was born in Ogden, Pennsylvania. The town is named after Ogden's family who lived on the land now known as Upper Chichester, Southwest of Philadelphia for generations. Ogden's ancestor had come to America from England on the same ship as William Penn. Ogden was a three-sport athlete at Chester High School.

Ogden attended Swarthmore College, where he played baseball and was a member of Phi Psi.

== Career ==
Ogden was signed out of college by the Giants in 1918, but pitched just five games in relief before being sent to the minor league Newark Bears of the International League. In January 1919, he was traded along with four other players—including future Hall of Famer Waite Hoyt—to the Rochester Hustlers for catcher Earl Smith.

After spending one season with Rochester, Ogden joined the Baltimore Orioles, for whom he was a rotation mainstay for eight seasons, leading the International League in wins four times.

Ogden finally returned to the majors in 1928, ten years after his debut, with the St. Louis Browns. He pitched two seasons in St. Louis, then missed the entire 1930 season before pitching two more seasons for the Reds. He was traded to the St. Louis Cardinals in 1933, playing briefly for their minor league team the Rochester Red Wings. Ogden returned to Baltimore in 1934 and retired as an Oriole.

After his retirement from playing baseball, Ogden accepted the position of Vice President and General Manager of the Orioles. From 1935 to 1938, he was also the head basketball coach at the University of Baltimore. He became assistant to Philadelphia Phillies President Gerald Nugent in 1939.

In 1941, Ogden became the owner of the Elmira Pioneers, a minor league baseball team in the Pennsylvania–Ontario–New York League (PONY League).

Ogden was a scout for the Boston Braves and the Philadelphia Phillies best known for signing Dick Allen.

== Awards ==
In 1952, Ogden was elected to the International League Hall of Fame.

In 1956, Ogden was inducted into the Delaware County Athletes Hall of Fame.

In 1968, Ogden was inducted into Baltimore baseball's Shrine of Immortals.

== Personal life ==
Ogden's brother, Warren "Curly" Ogden, was also a pitcher for Swarthmore and went on to play in Major League Baseball for the Philadelphia Athletics and the Washington Senators.

Ogden married Swarthmore College classmate Dorothy Young in April 1920. Together they had one son, John. M. Ogden Jr., in July 1923.

Ogden died at Lankenau Medical Center in Wynnewood, Pennsylvania, on November 9, 1977, and is interred at the Oxford Cemetery in Oxford, Pennsylvania.
