= Harrison Park (New Jersey) =

Baseball ground in Harrison, New Jersey

Coordinates: 40.7399°N 74.1581°W

- Peppers Park
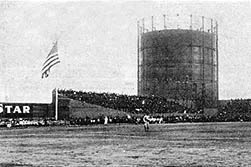
- Interactive map of Harrison Park
- Former names: Federal Baseball Park
- Address: Harrison, NJ; U.S.
- Owner: City of Harrison
- Capacity: 21,000
- Type: Ballpark
- Surface: Grass
- Current use: Baseball; Soccer

Construction
- Demolished: 1923; 103 years ago (destroyed by fire)

Tenants
- Newark Peppers (1915); West Hudson A.A. (NAFL); American Cup finals (1920, 1921); National Challenge Cup finals (1918, 1923); Newark Bears (MiLB)

Harrison Park is a former ballpark located in Harrison, New Jersey, a town adjacent to Newark, New Jersey. The ground was home to the Newark Peppers of the Federal League in 1915. The field was also known as "Peppers Park" or "Peps Park".

The stadium also hosted soccer games, being host to the American Cup final twice and the National Challenge Cup finals twice.

In publications such as city directories and newspapers, it was often called "Federal Baseball Park" even during its International League days.

== Location ==
The ballpark was located within the city limits of Harrison, a block and a half east of the Passaic River and a block and a half west of the former Harrison Hudson and Manhattan Railroad (now PATH) station. Home plate was in the northwest corner. The ballpark was bounded by Middlesex Street [now Angelo Cifelli Drive] (north, third base); South 3rd Street (east, left field); Burlington Avenue (south, right field); and South 2nd Street (west, first base).

There were (and are) railroad yards skirting the southeast corner of the property; Public Service Corporation oil tanks were visible behind the right-center field seating, adjacent to the rail yards. An Otis Elevator Company factory stood across the street to the west, near the river.

== Baseball ==
Map of Harrison showing the ballpark

The stadium had a seating capacity of around 21,000. It was a large ballpark, with dimensions of 375 feet in left, 450 feet to center and 375 feet in right; these dimensions, and the fact that baseball was still in its "dead ball" era, made it difficult to hit for power.

Just six home runs were hit in Federal League play in Harrison, and only one left the ballpark, hit by the Peps' Emil Huhn (his only career home run). Huhn would be better known as Fred Toney's catcher in the "double no-hit" game on May 2, 1917, where both Toney and Hippo Vaughn tossed no-hitters through nine innings. A crowd of 26,032 attended the opener on April 16, 1915; subsequent crowds were in the 5,000-10,000 range.

Hal Chase, the "Black Prince of Baseball", was involved in an altercation just outside Harrison Park after a game on Sunday, April 25, 1915. Chase, playing for the Federal League team in Buffalo, came to blows with Newark fan Billy Quinn, who had been heckling Chase. Saloon owner (and former boxer) Patrick McGuigan joined the fray and landed a few blows before police broke up the brawl. Chase was uninjured and played the next two days in Harrison.

After the Federal League disbanded at the end of the 1915 season, the American and National Leagues acquired the ballpark. After "Wiedenmayer's Park" closed the next year, MLB rented Harrison Park to the minor league Newark Bears of the International League until it burned in 1923.

== Soccer ==
Harrison Park also hosted several soccer matches in its day and was the home field of West Hudson A.A. of the National Association Football League for their final few seasons.

The U.S. Open Cup (then, "National Challenge Cup" competition twice held its final match there, in 1918 and again in 1923. On May 4, 1918, after a 2–2 draw between the Fall River Rovers and Bethlehem Steel F.C. in Fall River, the replay was held in Harrison on May 19; Bethlehem Steel won, 3–0, in front of a crowd of 10,000. Five years later, on April 1, 1923, local side Paterson F.C. played St. Louis Scullin Steel F.C. to a 2–2 draw in Harrison with 15,000 in attendance. Scullin declined a rematch, however, as much of their roster were also pro baseball players who had joined their teams; Paterson was awarded the Cup by default.

The site of the ballpark is only a few blocks northwest of the present-day Sports Illustrated Stadium. Opened in 2010, it is home to the New York Red Bulls of Major League Soccer and Gotham FC of the National Women's Soccer League. The site previously was used as a parking lot for the stadium.

== Fate ==
Harrison Park was destroyed by a fire a couple of hours after the game played on August 18, 1923. The Bears played on the road for the remaining six weeks or so of the season. In 1924, they moved to Meadowbrook Oval in Newark, a site previously used for local semi-pro teams. In 1926, they moved to the new Ruppert Stadium in Newark's Ironbound neighborhood.

The site of Harrison Park is now home to a luxury apartment building and a Montessori school.

== Bibliography ==
- Marc Okkonen, The Federal League of 1914-1915: Baseball's Third Major League, SABR, 1989.
