= Star Park =

Baseball ground in Syracuse, New York, US

Coordinates: 43.03958°N 76.15030°W

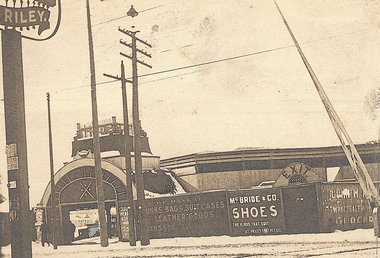
- Star Park in 1885.
- Interactive map of Star Park
- Location: Syracuse, New York
- Capacity: 6,000 (American football)
- Surface: Grass

Tenants
- Syracuse Stars (AA) (1885–1890); Syracuse Pros (APFA) (1921); Syracuse Athletic Club (Ind.) (1890–1900); Syracuse Stars (MiLB) (1877–1889, 1891–1929)

Starr Park is the name applied to several former sports stadiums in Syracuse, New York. The name referred to the Syracuse professional baseball teams, which were called the Stars beginning around 1870 and continuing in most seasons until the last Stars team was fielded in 1929.

- The first of these venues was an alternate name of Newell Park, at the southeast corner of South Salina Street and what is now East Raynor Avenue. It was the home field of Stars teams from 1878 through 1884, including the Syracuse Stars of the National League in 1879.
- The second, and longest-lived, Star Park opened in 1885, a couple of long blocks north of Newell Park. It was bounded by Salina, Taylor, Oneida and Temple Streets, with the Delaware, Lackawanna and Western Railroad tracks running through a corner of the block. In addition to various Syracuse Stars minor league clubs through its two decades of existence, the field was the home of the Syracuse Stars of the major league American Association during the 1890 season. After 20 years of use, the city decided not to renew the ball club's lease, and ran what is now South Clinton Street through the property
- The next Star Park was initially called Athletic Park. It was first the home of the Syracuse Stars minor league team in the Eastern League during 1900 and part of 1901. The Stars returned to the Salina and Taylor location during 1902 through 1904, after which the city closed it. The Stars then resumed play at Athletic Park, redubbing it New Star Park, which they used as members of the New York State League during the 1905 and 1906 seasons. Athletic Park / New Star Park was bordered by Marsh Street (later Hiawatha Boulevard) to the south, and by Pulaski and Liberty Streets.
- After the 1906 season, the Stars moved again, about a mile northward, to a field called Hallock Park or First Ward Park or, again, Star Park. The Stars fielded teams in the New York State League from 1907 through 1917, then had another try with the International League, for 1918 only. This ballpark has been described as near the end of North Salina Street "not far from" Onondaga Lake, and Hiawatha Boulevard toward the southeast. What is now Park Street was to the northeast, across which there is now a Regional Market. The ballpark site itself was eventually swallowed by ramps for Interstate Highway 81.
- The final version of Star Park, also known as Syracuse Athletic Park and International League Park, opened in 1920, and closed after the 1929 season. It was located at 1420 West Genesee Street, on the north side of that street between State Fair Boulevard and the New York Central tracks. It was the home of Stars teams in the International League during 1920 through 1927, and then a short-lived Stars entry in the New York–Pennsylvania League during 1928, and part way through the 1929 season.

This last Star Park was also the home of the short-lived Syracuse Pros football team, who were "possible" members of the American Professional Football Association (later renamed the National Football League), in 1921.

Syracuse was without minor league ball until Municipal Stadium opened in 1934, for a newly transferred International League club that was named the Syracuse Chiefs.

== See also ==
- MacArthur Stadium
- Newell Park
- NBT Bank Stadium
