= Oriole Park =

Baseball stadium in Baltimore, Maryland

- Terrapin Park
- Terrapin Park at NW Greenmount Ave and 29th St (1938)
- Former names: Terrapin Park (1914–1915)
- Location: NW Greenmount Ave and 29th St
- Capacity: 16,000 (1914); 14,000 (1940)
- Surface: grass
- Field size: Left – 290 ft.; Center – 412 ft.; Right – 313 ft. (1935)

Construction
- Opened: 1914
- Closed: July 3, 1944
- Architect: Otto G. Simonson

Tenants
- Baltimore Orioles (AL) (1901–1902); Baltimore Terrapins (FL) (1914–1915); Baltimore Orioles (IL) (1916–1944); Baltimore Elite Giants (NNL) (1938–1944)

Oriole Park was the name of multiple baseball parks in Baltimore, Maryland between 1883 and 1944, all built within a few blocks of each other. They were all home to the Baltimore Orioles from the American Association and National League in the 19th century, through the American League in 1901 and 1902, and International League. The parks were also home to the Federal League Baltimore Terrapins and Negro National League Baltimore Elite Giants.

== Oriole Park I, 1883–1888 ==
The first field called Oriole Park I was built on the southwest corner of Sixth Street and Huntingdon Avenue (later renamed 25th Street), to the north; and York Road (later Greenmount Avenue) to the east. The park was also variously known as Huntingdon Avenue Park and American Association Park. It was the first home of the major league American Association professional baseball franchise, the first to bear the name of the Baltimore Orioles I, during 1882–1888.

== Oriole Park II, 1889–1891 ==
Diagram of the 1889 ballpark

The Orioles moved four blocks north and opened new Oriole Park, retroactively called Oriole Park II. The ballpark sat on a roughly rectangular block bounded by 10th Street (later renamed 29th Street) on the north and York Road (later Greenmount Avenue) on the east, 9th Street (later renamed 28th Street) was to the south, and Barclay Street on the west. The field in the then-suburban village of Waverly, a community then just outside the northeast city limits of Baltimore at North Avenue (then Boundary Avenue), from 1816, served as the home of the American Association Orioles entry from 1889 through the first month of the spring season in 1891.

A rough diagram of the ballpark which appeared in the Baltimore Sun on March 21, 1889, showed the diamond and the stands in the northern portion of the block, with the outfield in the southern portion.

The first game scheduled for the new park was an exhibition against the Philadelphia Phillies on March 28, 1889, that was cancelled due to the muddy field. The ballpark's first game was March 29, 1889, in which the Phillies defeated the Orioles 4–2.

The club's reason for abandoning the park after just two full seasons is implied in another Baltimore Sun article on April 27, 1891, which described the upcoming Union Park as "better and more convenient". Coincidentally, Oriole Park II was one city block south of two later Oriole Parks at 29th Street and Greenmount Avenue in the early 20th century, 1901–1915 and 1916–1944.

== Union Park II / Oriole Park III, 1891–1899 ==
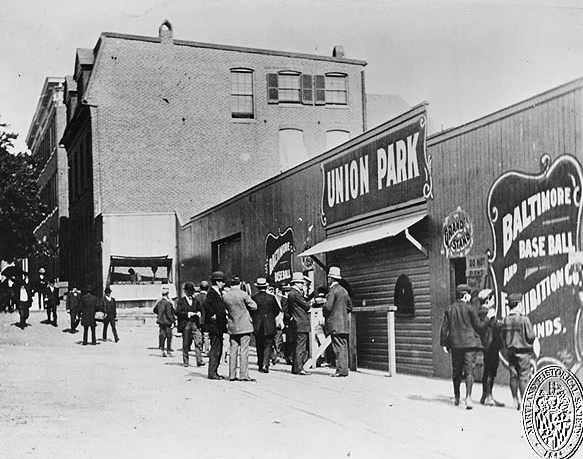
Union Park entrance

The club opened Union Park, sometimes called Oriole Park, and retroactively designated Oriole Park III, on May 11, 1891, also south of Waverly at Greenmount Avenue and Sixth Street (also called Huntingdon Avenue, and today known as 25th Street). The team joined the National League in 1892 after the American Association folded. Union Park was the Orioles' home when the club won three straight National League pennants and the championship Temple Cup twice. Baltimore was dropped when the National League contracted from 12 to eight teams in 1900.

== American League Park / Oriole Park IV, 1901–1914 ==
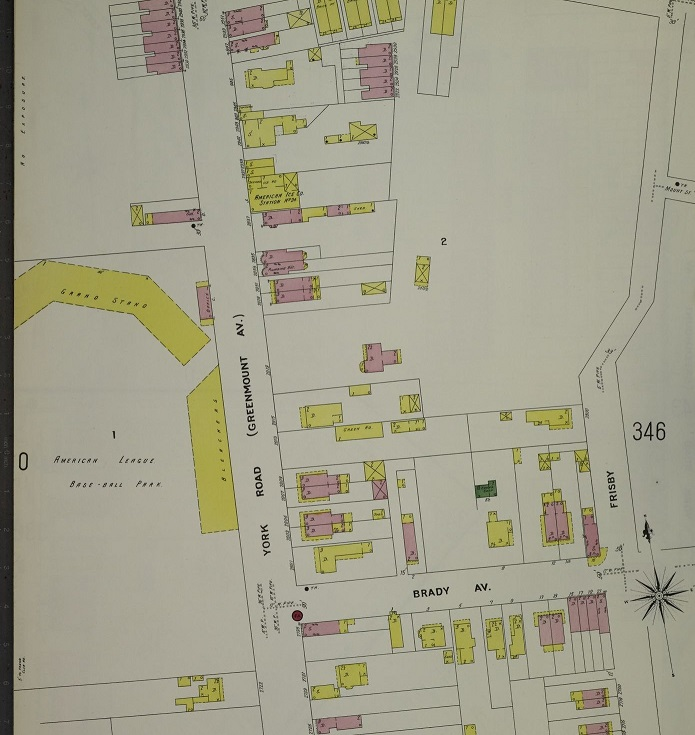
Oriole Park in its original configuration

The American League was formed in 1901 as a reorganization of the Western League, under its new president Ban Johnson, adding some of the dropped cities while directly challenging the National League in other cities. They opened a new Oriole Park (retroactively called Oriole Park IV, as well as being dubbed American League Park by the contemporary media). It was on the same site but slightly farther north as the 1889–91 field site (located at 39°19′22″N 76°36′37″W) from the last years of the old American Association.

The American League's new Orioles and charter member team played for two seasons before they folded and were replaced for the 1903 season with the New York City team, the New York Highlanders (or the New York Americans), as part of a peace pact and recognition agreement between the two competing baseball leagues, and to give the American League a foothold in the nation's largest city. That Highlanders team soon became known as the New York Yankees. Baltimore revived professional baseball as a minor league club, an entry in the Eastern League (later renamed International League), which began play at this same ballpark, which they renamed Oriole Park. There they were very successful, producing some remarkable and marketable players, including the local star Babe Ruth, who was sold to the Boston Red Sox as a pitcher, and later gained even greater fame as a home run slugger with that same New York Yankees franchise which had begun in Baltimore.

The block was rectangular, with home plate in the northwest corner. A Baltimore Sun piece about the new Terrapin Park on May 29, 1914, gave the dimensions of Oriole Park (IV) as left field 322 feet (98 m), center field 475 feet (145 m), right field 318 feet (97 m).

== Terrapin Park / Oriole Park V, 1914–1944 ==
Terrapin Park diagram

The last and by far the best known Oriole Park prior to Camden Yards was the fifth one, which started life as Terrapin Park. It was the home field of the Baltimore Terrapins of the short-lived Federal League of 1914–1915. Some of the "Fed" facilities, such as the eventual Wrigley Field, in Chicago (which later became home of the Chicago Cubs) were made of steel and concrete. Terrapin Park was made of wood, which would prove to be its undoing, but its eventual demise would boost Baltimore's chances of returning to the major leagues.

Terrapin Park was built on a wedge-shaped block bounded by 10th Street (later renamed 29th Street), York Road (later Greenmount Avenue), 11th Street (later renamed 30th Street) and the angling small alley-like Vineyard Lane (originally Gilmore Lane).

The park known as both Terrapin Park and then Oriole Park was located at the coordinates 39°19′26″N 76°36′40″W. Home plate was toward the southwest corner, in the "vee" of the wedge-shaped block. The playing field was smaller by contemporary standards.

The two ballparks in 1915 on Sanborn insurance map

The ballpark was across the street, to the north and west, from the existing Oriole Park, also known as American League Park. The competition proved too much for the Orioles, who left Baltimore after their home game of August 22, 1914. The Federal League closed after two seasons, and a revived Orioles club acquired the newer park to the north in 1916, renaming it Oriole Park, (Oriole Park V). The abandoned Oriole Park IV property became the site of a Billy Sunday tabernacle.

Terrapin Park (circled) and old Oriole Park vacant lot in 1916

Following the demise of the "Fed", the Baltimore professional baseball interests became a primary party in an antitrust legal suit filed against Major League Baseball and involving the Commissioner of Baseball. This resulted in the landmark 1922 U.S. Supreme Court decision, in Federal Baseball Club v. National League, that exempted baseball from antitrust laws.

This fifth Oriole Park was the club's home for 28½ seasons. The Orioles enjoyed great success at this ballpark, especially from 1919 through 1925 when they won seven consecutive International League pennants.

Due to World War II travel restrictions, the 1944 Boston Red Sox held spring training at the park, rather than traveling to Florida.

Great care was always taken to protect the aging wooden structure, such as hosing it down after games. Nonetheless, a fire on the night of July 3, 1944, destroyed the ballpark and forced the Orioles to find another home field.

== 1944 fire and Memorial Stadium ==
On the night of July 3, 1944, a fire of uncertain origin (speculated to have been a discarded cigarette) consumed the ballpark and every object the team had on-site, including uniforms and trophies.

The club quickly arranged their temporary home in Municipal Stadium, the city's football field which had opened in 1922. The Orioles went on to win the 1944 International League championship, and the Junior World Series over the Louisville Colonels. The large post-season crowds in 1944 at Municipal Stadium, which would not have been possible at the old wooden Oriole Park, caught the attention of the major leagues, and Baltimore soon became a viable option for struggling teams who were considering moving to other cities.

Motivated by the Orioles' success, the city chose to rebuild the old Municipal Stadium as a multi-purpose facility of major league caliber, which they renamed Memorial Stadium. Two new tenants were the National Football League's newly relocated Baltimore Colts in 1953, and then the American League Orioles, when the St. Louis Browns transferred to the city in 1954.

== Oriole Park at Camden Yards VI, 1992–present ==
After operating for nearly four decades at Memorial Stadium, in 1992 the club moved downtown to a new baseball-only facility which revived the traditional local ballpark name as Oriole Park at Camden Yards.

== Sources ==
- House of Magic, by the Baltimore Orioles.
- Green Cathedrals, by Phil Lowry.
- The Home Team, by James H. Bready.
