= Syracuse Stars (minor league baseball) =

Defunct USA minor league baseball team

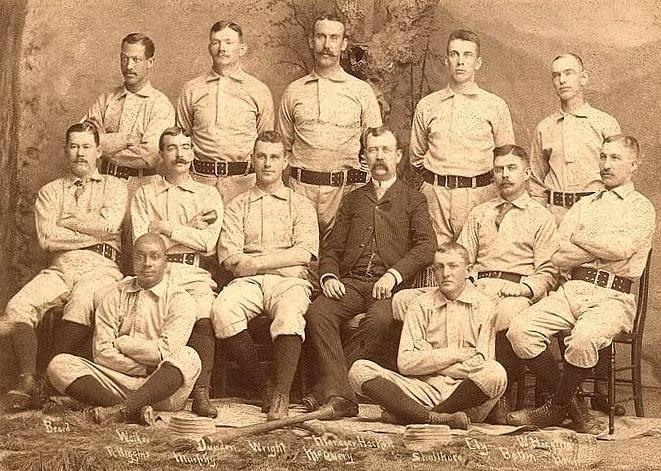
1888 Syracuse Stars

The Syracuse Stars was the name of several Minor league baseball teams who played between 1877 and 1929. The Stars were based in Syracuse, New York, and played in the International League, affiliated with the League Alliance; the New York State League (1885, 1902–1917), Eastern Association (1891), Eastern League (1892, 1894–1901), International League (1886–1887), International Association (1888–1889), and New York-Pennsylvania League (1928–1929).

== Season-by-season standings ==
Year	League	Record	Finish	Manager	Notes
1877	IL	20–9		Dick Higham	League Alliance tournament winner
1885	NYSL	52–37	1st	Henry Ormsbee; John Humphries	
1886	IL	46–47	6th	Henry Ormsbee; Frank Olin; James Gifford	
1887	IL	61–40	3rd	James Gifford	
1888	INTA	81–30	1st	Charles Hackett	Playoffs Championship
1889	INTA	63–44	2nd	Jack Chapman	
1891	EASA	56–42	–	George Frazier	Team disbanded on August 25
1892	EL	24–36	–	Jay Faatz	Team disbanded on July 22
1894	EL	63–56	3rd	Jay Faatz	
1895	EL	62–53	4th	Sandy Griffin	
1896	EL	59–62	5th	Charlie Reilly; George Kuntsch	
1897	EL	83–50	1st	Al Buckenberger	Title awarded to the Toronto Maple Leafs
1898	EL	52–63	6th	George Kuntzsch	
1899	EL	39–68	8th	Lew Whistler; Sandy Griffin	
1900	EL	43–84	8th	Arthur Irwin	none
1901	EL	45–87 (overall)	–	Frank Leonard	Team became the Brockton B's on July 25
1902	NYSL	61–55	4th	Sandy Griffin	
1903	NYSL	80–54	2nd	Sandy Griffin	
1904	NYSL	91–44	1st	Sandy Griffin	League Champion Team
1905	NYSL	70–51	2nd	Sandy Griffin	
1906	NYSL	70–65	3rd	Sandy Griffin	
1907	NYSL	61–75	6th	Sandy Griffin	
1908	NYSL	76–64	4th	Sandy Griffin	
1909	NYSL	60–78	7th	Sandy Griffin	
1910	NYSL	78–57	2nd	Edward Ashenbach	
1911	NYSL	65–74	6th	Edward Ashenbach; Snake Deal	
1912	NYSL	54–82	7th	Edward McCafferty; Fred Burchell	
1913	NYSL	61–78	6th	Fred Burchell; Fred Payne	
1914	NYSL	48–79	7th	Fred Payne	
1915	NYSL	60–60	5th	Mike O'Neill	
1916	NYSL	81–52	1st	Mike O'Neill	League Champion Team
1917	NYSL	64–51	3rd	Mike O'Neill	
1918	IL	38–76 (overall)	–	Patsy Donovan	Team became the Hamilton Tigers on August 6
1920	IL	33–116	8th	Tony Cummings; Amby McConnell; John Engman; Tom Madden	
1921	IL	71–96	6th	Tom Madden; Frank Shaughnessy	
1922	IL	64–102	7th	Frank Shaughnessy	
1923	IL	73–92	6th	Frank Shaughnessy	
1924	IL	79–83	6th	Frank Shaughnessy	
1925	IL	74–87	6th	Frank Shaughnessy; Harry Myers	
1926	IL	70–91	7th	Burt Shotton	
1927	IL	102–66	2nd	Burt Shotton	
1928	NYPL	64–74	6th	Mike O'Neill	
1929	NYPL	19–23 (63–74 overall)	–	Kaiser Wilhelm	Team joined the Hazleton Mountaineers on June 16

== See also ==
- 1876 in baseball
- Moses Fleetwood Walker
