= Baltimore Orioles (minor league) =

- 1903–1953; (1903–1914, 1916–1953); Baltimore, Maryland

Minor league affiliations
- Previous classes: Triple-A (1946–1953); Double-A (1912–1945); Single-A (1903–1911)
- League: International League (1912–1914, 1916–1953); Eastern League (1903–1911)

Major league affiliations
- Previous teams: Philadelphia Phillies (1951–1953); St. Louis Browns (1949–1950); Cleveland Indians (1942–1948); Philadelphia Phillies (1940)

Minor league titles
- League titles: 10 (1908, 1919, 1920, 1921, 1922, 1923, 1924, 1925, 1944, 1950)

Team data
- Previous parks: Memorial Stadium (1944–1953); Oriole Park V (1916–1943); Oriole Park IV (1901–1914)

The city of Baltimore, Maryland, has been home to two Minor League Baseball teams called the Baltimore Orioles, in addition to the three Major League Baseball teams that have used the name (the first of which played in the American Association in 1882 to 1891, then joined the National League from 1892 to 1899, the second being the American League charter franchise which played for two seasons in 1901 and 1902, and the modern AL team since April 1954.)

== Name history ==
"Orioles" is a traditional name for baseball clubs in Baltimore, after the state bird of Maryland, with the colors of black and orange/gold/yellow. It was used by major league teams representing the city from 1882 through 1899 in the old American Association and the original National League two decades after its founding in 1876, and by a charter team franchise member of the new American League from 1901 through 1902. The original American League franchise was replaced by a team in New York City in 1903 and eventually became known as the New York Yankees.

== First minor league team, 1903–1914 ==
In 1903, an Oriole minor league team joined the Eastern League (renamed the International League in 1911, and not to be confused with the present day Double-A level, minor league Eastern League). This Orioles team stayed mediocre for the first few years of its existence, but after the arrival of Jack Dunn (1872–1928), as manager, it won the Eastern League pennant in 1908. This E.L./I.L. Orioles team played at the old American League Park (a.k.a. Oriole Park) at the southwest corner of Greenmount Avenue and 29th Street in the Waverly neighborhood of northeast Baltimore.

The 1914 season featured the professional debut of local son George Herman "Babe" Ruth, but competition from the Baltimore Terrapins of the new Federal League, which challenged the existing major league in status, with their more modern steel-beamed ballpark across the street, forced Dunn to sell Ruth (to the Boston Red Sox) later in the 1914 season and many of his other players, and eventually temporarily relocate the team to Richmond, Virginia, as the Richmond Climbers, for the 1915 and 1916 seasons.

== Second minor league team, 1916–1953 ==
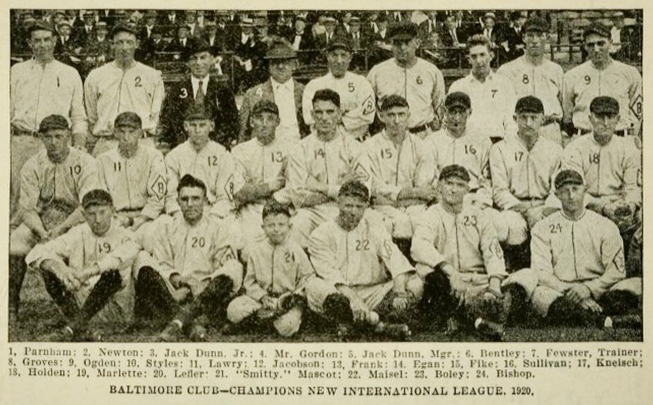
The 1920 Baltimore Orioles

After the Federal League's demise, Dunn returned with an Orioles team in 1916. This team, later in the 1919 I.L. Baseball Season won the International League pennant with 100 victories, the first team to win that many games and went on a championship spree, seldom seen in major or minor league baseball ever since. Featuring another future Hall-of-Fame pitcher in Lefty Grove, the Orioles improved on that in 1920 by winning 110 games, including the last 25 of the season. In 1921, the Orioles won 27 straight games (a record for consecutive victories by a minor league team that would stand until the Salt Lake City Trappers won 29 in 1987). The Orioles won the League by 20 games over the second place team, and had a home record of 70 wins and 18 losses. Despite their impressive record, however, they lost the "Little World Series" to the American Association's champion Louisville Colonels, 4 games to 1. The Orioles actually led the fourth game, 12–4, but a riot broke out among the Louisville home crowd in the top of the 9th inning, and the game was forfeited to Baltimore, 9–0. The I.L. Orioles continued to roll over International League opposition for several more seasons straight through to the 1925 Baseball Season.

The team entered the Governors' Cup playoffs in the International circuit in 1936, 1937, and 1940, but did not win another pennant until the "war year" of 1944. The team was leading the League on July 4 of that year, when their home wooden and steel beamed stadium, Oriole Park (formerly Terrapin Park of 1914), burned down. Even after relocating several blocks northwest to the old 1922 football bowl of Municipal Stadium on 33rd Street Boulevard (also known as "Baltimore Stadium"), the team seemed to have a hard time recovering from that loss, playing lackluster ball through the rest of the season and losing their last game, only to strangely "back into the championship" when the second place team, the Newark Bears, also lost their recent games. The Orioles, under manager Alphonse "Tommy" Thomas, went on to win the Junior World Series that year, four games to two, against Louisville.

The 1944 postseason was notable for the largest crowds drawn by the Orioles, as 32,913 turned out for a playoff matchup against Buffalo, which would then be dwarfed by a record 52,833 fans that showed up to Game 4 of the Junior World Series against Louisville, setting an all-time record for a Minor League Baseball postseason game.

With the shackles of war-time baseball cast off, the Orioles drew 620,726 fans in 1946, setting an International League attendance record that endured for nearly four decades. In 1950, under manager Nick Cullop, Baltimore won the league championship again, only to lose the "Junior World Series" to the Columbus Red Birds of Ohio, four games to one.

In 2001, the Orioles teams of 1919, 1920, 1921, 1922, 1923, and 1924 were recognized as being among the 100 greatest minor league teams of all time.

== Back to the majors ==
The huge crowds of the 1944 postseason suddenly sprung Baltimore into the conversation for a future MLB franchise. The success of the minor league Orioles ironically hastened their demise, as it helped spur the city of Baltimore to re-build Municipal Stadium into a major league-caliber venue.

After the 1953 season, the St. Louis Browns moved to Baltimore and took the name of the Baltimore Orioles. The last minor league/International League Orioles team (of 1916–1953) re-located to Richmond (coincidentally just as had the earlier Orioles team in 1914), this time as the Richmond Virginians from 1954 to 1964, later relocating as today's Toledo Mud Hens franchise in northwest Ohio since 1965.

== Championships ==
The Orioles won the Governors' Cup, the championship of the International League 2 times, and played in the Little World Series 5 times.

- 1936 – Lost to Buffalo
- 1937 – Lost to Newark
- 1940 – Lost to Newark
- 1944 – Defeated Newark
- 1950 – Defeated Rochester

== Notable players ==
- Hughie Jennings - 1903–06; Hall of Fame shortstop and manager
- Wilbert Robinson - 1903–06; Hall of Fame catcher and manager
- Jack Dunn - 1907–11, 1919; second baseman, later manager and owner of the club
- Home Run Baker - 1908; Hall of Fame third baseman
- Sammy Strang - 1908–10; Major League Baseball third baseman and outfielder
- Cy Seymour - 1910–11; Major League Baseball pitcher and outfielder
- Fritz Maisel - 1911–13, 1919–28; Major League Baseball third baseman, longest-tenured player in Orioles history
- Bob Shawkey - 1912–13; Major League Baseball pitcher
- Babe Ruth - 1914; Hall of Fame pitcher and outfielder
- Jack Bentley - 1916–17, 1919–22; Major League Baseball pitcher and first baseman
- Max Bishop - 1918–23, 1936; Major League Baseball second baseman
- Lefty Grove - 1920–24; Hall of Fame pitcher
- Chief Bender - 1923; Hall of Fame pitcher
- George Earnshaw - 1924–28; Major League Baseball pitcher
- Sherry Magee - 1925–26; Major League Baseball outfielder
- Joe Hauser - 1930–31; Major League Baseball first baseman and outfielder
- Buzz Arlett - 1932–33; Major League Baseball outfielder
- Phil Weintraub - 1938; Major League Baseball first baseman and outfielder
- Sherm Lollar - 1943–46; Major League Baseball catcher
- Bobby Ávila - 1948; Major League Baseball second baseman
