= 1955 International League season =

- League: International League
- Sport: Baseball
- Duration: April 19 – September 18
- Games: 154
- Teams: 8

Regular season
- Season MVP: Rocky Nelson, Montreal Royals

Governors' Cup Playoffs
- League champions: Rochester Red Wings
- Runners-up: Toronto Maple Leafs

IL seasons
- ← 1954 1956 →

The 1955 International League was a Class AAA baseball season played between April 19 and September 18. Eight teams played a 154-game schedule, with the top four teams qualifying for the post-season.

The Rochester Red Wings won the Governors' Cup, defeating the Toronto Maple Leafs in the final round of the playoffs.

== Team changes ==
- The Ottawa Athletics relocated to Columbus, Ohio and were renamed the Columbus Jets. The club continued their affiliation with the Kansas City Athletics.
- The Havana Sugar Kings began an affiliation with the Cincinnati Reds.

== Teams ==
1955 International League
Team	City	MLB Affiliate	Stadium
Buffalo Bisons	Buffalo, New York	Detroit Tigers	Offermann Stadium
Columbus Jets	Columbus, Ohio	Kansas City Athletics	Jets Stadium
Havana Sugar Kings	Havana, Cuba	Cincinnati Reds	Gran Stadium
Montreal Royals	Montreal, Quebec	Brooklyn Dodgers	Delorimier Stadium
Richmond Virginians	Richmond, Virginia	None	Parker Field
Rochester Red Wings	Rochester, New York	St. Louis Cardinals	Red Wing Stadium
Syracuse Chiefs	Syracuse, New York	Philadelphia Phillies	MacArthur Stadium
Toronto Maple Leafs	Toronto, Ontario	None	Maple Leaf Stadium

== Map of teams ==
International League teams

== Regular season ==
=== Summary ===
- The Montreal Royals finished with the best record in the regular season for the first time since 1952.
- Rocky Nelson of the Montreal Royals became the first player in league history to win the International League Most Valuable Player Award twice. He previously won the award in the 1953 season.

=== Standings ===
International League
Team	Win	Loss	%	GB
Montreal Royals	95	59	.617	–
Toronto Maple Leafs	94	59	.614	0.5
Havana Sugar Kings	87	66	.569	7.5
Rochester Red Wings	76	77	.497	18.5
Syracuse Chiefs	74	79	.484	20.5
Buffalo Bisons	65	89	.422	30
Columbus Jets	64	89	.418	30.5
Richmond Virginians	58	95	.379	36.5

== League Leaders ==
=== Batting leaders ===
Stat	Player	Total
AVG	Rocky Nelson, Montreal Royals	.364
H	Bob Wilson, Montreal Royals	190
R	Rocky Nelson, Montreal Royals	118
2B	Bob Wilson, Montreal Royals	41
3B	Charlie Neal, Montreal Royals	14
HR	Rocky Nelson, Montreal Royals	37
RBI	Rocky Nelson, Montreal Royals	130
SB	Jackie Brandt, Rochester Red Wings; Joe Caffie, Syracuse Chiefs; Sam Jethroe, Toronto Maple Leafs	24

=== Pitching leaders ===
Stat	Player	Total
W	Ken Lehman, Montreal Royals	22
L	Bob Habenicht, Richmond Virginians	18
ERA	Jack Crimian, Toronto Maple Leafs	2.10
CG	Ed Roebuck, Montreal Royals	20
SHO	Ken Lehman, Montreal Royals	6
SO	Jim Owens, Syracuse Chiefs	161
IP	Ken Lehman, Montreal Royals	241.0

== Playoffs ==
- The Rochester Red Wings won their third Governors' Cup, defeating the Toronto Maple Leafs in four games.

=== Playoff bracket ===
Semi-finals
1	Montreal	1
4	Rochester	4
2	Toronto	4
3	Havana	1

Governors' Cup
4	Syracuse	4
2	Toronto	0

== Awards ==
Player awards
Award name	Recipient
Most Valuable Player	Rocky Nelson, Montreal Royals
Pitcher of the Year	Jack Crimian, Toronto Maple Leafs
Rookie of the Year	Jackie Brandt, Rochester Red Wings

== See also ==
- 1955 Major League Baseball season
