= 1954 International League season =

- League: International League
- Sport: Baseball
- Duration: April 20 – October 2
- Games: 154
- Teams: 8

Regular season
- Season MVP: Elston Howard, Toronto Maple Leafs

Governors' Cup Playoffs
- League champions: Syracuse Chiefs
- Runners-up: Montreal Royals

IL seasons
- ← 1953 1955 →

The 1954 International League was a Class AAA baseball season played between April 20 and October 2. Eight teams played a 154-game schedule, with the top four teams qualifying for the post-season.

The Syracuse Chiefs won the Governors' Cup, defeating the Montreal Royals in the final round of the playoffs.

== Team changes ==
- The Baltimore Orioles relocated to Richmond, Virginia and were renamed the Richmond Virginians. The club also ended their affiliation with the Philadelphia Phillies.
- The Springfield Cubs fold.
- The Havana Sugar Kings join the league as an expansion team.
- The Syracuse Chiefs ended their affiliation with the New York Yankees and began an affiliation with the Philadelphia Phillies.

== Teams ==
1954 International League
| Team | City | MLB Affiliate | Stadium |
| Buffalo Bisons | Buffalo, New York | Detroit Tigers | Offermann Stadium |
| Havana Sugar Kings | Havana, Cuba | None | Gran Stadium |
| Montreal Royals | Montreal, Quebec | Brooklyn Dodgers | Delorimier Stadium |
| Ottawa Athletics | Ottawa, Ontario | Philadelphia Athletics | Lansdowne Park |
| Richmond Virginians | Richmond, Virginia | None | Parker Field |
| Rochester Red Wings | Rochester, New York | St. Louis Cardinals | Red Wing Stadium |
| Syracuse Chiefs | Syracuse, New York | Philadelphia Phillies | MacArthur Stadium |
| Toronto Maple Leafs | Toronto, Ontario | None | Maple Leaf Stadium |

== Map of teams ==
International League teams

== Regular season ==
=== Summary ===
- The Toronto Maple Leafs finished with the best record in the regular season for the first time since 1943.
- The Syracuse Chiefs and Havana Sugar Kings played a one-game tie-breaking game in Syracuse, New York for the final playoff position. The Chiefs defeated the Sugar Kings 13-4.

=== Standings ===
International League
| Team | Win | Loss | % | GB |
|---|---|---|---|---|
| Toronto Maple Leafs | 97 | 57 | .630 | – |
| Montreal Royals | 88 | 66 | .571 | 9 |
| Rochester Red Wings | 86 | 68 | .558 | 11 |
| Syracuse Chiefs | 79 | 76 | .510 | 18.5 |
| Havana Sugar Kings | 78 | 77 | .503 | 19.5 |
| Buffalo Bisons | 71 | 83 | .461 | 26 |
| Richmond Virginians | 60 | 94 | .390 | 37 |
| Ottawa Athletics | 58 | 96 | .377 | 39 |

== League Leaders ==
=== Batting leaders ===
| Stat | Player | Total |
|---|---|---|
| AVG | Bill Virdon, Rochester Red Wings | .333 |
| H | Sam Jethroe, Toronto Maple Leafs | 181 |
| R | Sam Jethroe, Toronto Maple Leafs | 113 |
| 2B | Chico Fernández, Montreal Royals | 44 |
| 3B | Elston Howard, Toronto Maple Leafs | 16 |
| HR | Rocky Nelson, Montreal Royals | 31 |
| RBI | Ed Stevens, Toronto Maple Leafs | 113 |
| SB | Don Nicholas, Havana Sugar Kings | 37 |

=== Pitching leaders ===
| Stat | Player | Total |
|---|---|---|
| W | Jack Faszholz, Rochester Red Wings; Ken Lehman, Montreal Royals; Ed Roebuck, Montreal Royals | 18 |
| ERA | Jim Owens, Syracuse Chiefs | 2.87 |
| CG | Ed Roebuck, Montreal Royals | 20 |
| SHO | Ken Johnson, Buffalo Bisons; Jim Owens, Syracuse Chiefs; Ed Roebuck, Montreal Royals | 5 |
| SO | Jack Meyer, Syracuse Chiefs | 173 |
| IP | Jack Faszholz, Rochester Red Wings | 225.0 |

== Playoffs ==
- The Syracuse Chiefs won their fifth Governors' Cup, defeating the Montreal Royals in seven games.

=== Playoff bracket ===
Semi-finals
1 | Toronto | 2
4 | Syracuse | 4
2 | Montreal | 4
3 | Rochester | 2

Governors' Cup
4 | Syracuse | 4
2 | Montreal | 3

== Awards ==
Player awards
| Award name | Recipient |
|---|---|
| Most Valuable Player | Elston Howard, Toronto Maple Leafs |
| Pitcher of the Year | Jim Owens, Syracuse Chiefs |
| Rookie of the Year | Jim Owens, Syracuse Chiefs |

== See also ==
- 1954 Major League Baseball season
