= 1953 International League season =

- League: International League
- Sport: Baseball
- Duration: April 22 – September 28
- Games: 154
- Teams: 8

Regular season
- Season MVP: Rocky Nelson, Montreal Royals

Governors' Cup Playoffs
- League champions: Montreal Royals
- Runners-up: Rochester Red Wings

IL seasons
- ← 1952 1954 →

The 1953 International League was a Class AAA baseball season played between April 22 and September 28. Eight teams played a 154-game schedule, with the top four teams qualifying for the post-season.

The Montreal Royals won the Governors' Cup, defeating the Rochester Red Wings in the final round of the playoffs.

== Team changes ==
- The Syracuse Chiefs became affiliated with the New York Yankees.
- The Toronto Maple Leafs ended their affiliation with the St. Louis Browns.

== Teams ==
1953 International League
| Team | City | MLB Affiliate | Stadium |
| Baltimore Orioles | Baltimore, Maryland | Philadelphia Phillies | Municipal Stadium |
| Buffalo Bisons | Buffalo, New York | Detroit Tigers | Offermann Stadium |
| Montreal Royals | Montreal, Quebec | Brooklyn Dodgers | Delorimier Stadium |
| Ottawa Athletics | Ottawa, Ontario | Philadelphia Athletics | Lansdowne Park |
| Rochester Red Wings | Rochester, New York | St. Louis Cardinals | Red Wing Stadium |
| Springfield Cubs | Springfield, Massachusetts | Chicago Cubs | Pynchon Park |
| Syracuse Chiefs | Syracuse, New York | New York Yankees | MacArthur Stadium |
| Toronto Maple Leafs | Toronto, Ontario | None | Maple Leaf Stadium |

== Map of teams ==
International League teams

== Regular season ==
=== Summary ===
- The Rochester Red Wings finished with the best record in the regular season for the first time since 1950.

=== Standings ===
International League
| Team | Win | Loss | % | GB |
|---|---|---|---|---|
| Rochester Red Wings | 97 | 57 | .630 | – |
| Montreal Royals | 89 | 63 | .586 | 7 |
| Buffalo Bisons | 87 | 65 | .572 | 9 |
| Baltimore Orioles | 82 | 72 | .532 | 15 |
| Toronto Maple Leafs | 78 | 76 | .506 | 19 |
| Ottawa Athletics | 71 | 83 | .461 | 26 |
| Syracuse Chiefs | 58 | 95 | .379 | 38.5 |
| Springfield Cubs | 51 | 102 | .333 | 45.5 |

== League Leaders ==
=== Batting leaders ===
| Stat | Player | Total |
|---|---|---|
| AVG | Sandy Amorós, Montreal Royals | .353 |
| H | Sandy Amorós, Montreal Royals | 190 |
| R | Sandy Amorós, Montreal Royals | 128 |
| 2B | Sandy Amorós, Montreal Royals | 40 |
| 3B | Herb Adams, Springfield Cubs | 12 |
| HR | Rocky Nelson, Montreal Royals | 34 |
| RBI | Rocky Nelson, Montreal Royals | 136 |
| SB | Walter Rogers, Ottawa Athletics | 30 |

=== Pitching leaders ===
| Stat | Player | Total |
|---|---|---|
| W | Bob Trice, Ottawa Athletics | 21 |
| L | Jim Brosnan, Springfield Cubs; Don Elston, Springfield Cubs; Duke Markell, Syracuse Chiefs | 17 |
| ERA | Don Johnson, Toronto Maple Leafs | 2.67 |
| CG | Don Elston, Springfield Cubs; Bob Trice, Ottawa Athletics | 20 |
| SHO | Bob Trice, Ottawa Athletics | 4 |
| SO | Don Johnson, Don Johnson | 156 |
| IP | Duke Markell, Syracuse Chiefs | 247.0 |

== Playoffs ==
- The Montreal Royals won their sixth Governors' Cup, defeating the Rochester Red Wings in four games.

=== Playoff bracket ===
Semi-finals
1 | Rochester | 4
4 | Baltimore | 3
2 | Montreal | 4
3 | Buffalo | 2

Governors' Cup
1 | Rochester | 0
2 | Montreal | 4

== Awards ==
Player awards
| Award name | Recipient |
|---|---|
| Most Valuable Player | Rocky Nelson, Montreal Royals |
| Pitcher of the Year | Bob Trice, Ottawa Athletics |
| Rookie of the Year | Bob Trice, Ottawa Athletics |

== See also ==
- 1953 Major League Baseball season
