= 1952 International League season =

- League: International League
- Sport: Baseball
- Duration: April 16 – September 25
- Games: 154
- Teams: 8

Regular season
- Season MVP: Jim Gilliam, Montreal Royals

Governors' Cup Playoffs
- League champions: Rochester Red Wings
- Runners-up: Montreal Royals

IL seasons
- ← 1951 1953 →

The 1952 International League was a Class AAA baseball season played between April 16 and September 25. Eight teams played a 154-game schedule, with the top four teams qualifying for the post-season.

The Rochester Red Wings won the Governors' Cup, defeating the Montreal Royals in the final round of the playoffs.

== Team changes ==
- The Ottawa Giants would be renamed the Ottawa Athletics as the club ended their affiliation with the New York Giants and became an affiliate with the Philadelphia Athletics.
- The Buffalo Bisons became an affiliate with the Detroit Tigers.

== Teams ==
1952 International League
Team	City	MLB Affiliate	Stadium
Baltimore Orioles	Baltimore, Maryland	Philadelphia Phillies	Municipal Stadium
Buffalo Bisons	Buffalo, New York	Detroit Tigers	Offermann Stadium
Montreal Royals	Montreal, Quebec	Brooklyn Dodgers	Delorimier Stadium
Ottawa Athletics	Ottawa, Ontario	Philadelphia Athletics	Lansdowne Park
Rochester Red Wings	Rochester, New York	St. Louis Cardinals	Red Wing Stadium
Springfield Cubs	Springfield, Massachusetts	Chicago Cubs	Pynchon Park
Syracuse Chiefs	Syracuse, New York	None	MacArthur Stadium
Toronto Maple Leafs	Toronto, Ontario	St. Louis Browns	Maple Leaf Stadium

== Map of teams ==
International League teams

== Regular season ==
=== Summary ===
- The Montreal Royals finished with the best record in the regular season for the second consecutive season.

=== Standings ===
International League
Team	Win	Loss	%	GB
Montreal Royals	95	56	.629	–
Syracuse Chiefs	88	66	.571	8.5
Rochester Red Wings	80	74	.519	16.5
Toronto Maple Leafs	78	76	.506	18.5
Buffalo Bisons	71	83	.461	25.5
Baltimore Orioles	70	84	.455	26.5
Ottawa Athletics	65	85	.433	29.5
Springfield Cubs	65	88	.425	31

== League Leaders ==
=== Batting leaders ===
Stat	Player	Total
AVG	Frank Carswell, Buffalo Bisons	.344
H	Don Richmond, Rochester Red Wings	190
R	Jim Gilliam, Montreal Royals	111
2B	Don Richmond, Rochester Red Wings	40
3B	Don Hoak, Montreal Royals	15
HR	Frank Carswell, Buffalo Bisons	30
RBI	Ed Stevens, Toronto Maple Leafs	113
SB	John Metkovich, Ottawa Athletics	23

=== Pitching leaders ===
Stat	Player	Total
W	Bob Keegan, Syracuse Chiefs	20
L	Fred Martin, Rochester Red Wings; Jocko Thompson, Baltimore Orioles	14
ERA	Marion Fricano, Ottawa Athletics	2.26
CG	Bob Keegan, Syracuse Chiefs	27
SHO	Bob Keegan, Syracuse Chiefs	7
SO	Duke Markell, Toronto Maple Leafs	120
IP	Bob Keegan, Syracuse Chiefs	273.0

== Playoffs ==
- The Rochester Red Wings won their second Governors' Cup, defeating the Montreal Royals in six games.

=== Playoff bracket ===
Semi-finals
1	Montreal	4
4	Toronto	3
2	Syracuse	0
3	Rochester	4

Governors' Cup
1	Montreal	2
3	Rochester	4

== Awards ==
Player awards
Award name	Recipient	Position
Most Valuable Player	Jim Gilliam, Montreal Royals	Second baseman
Rookie of the Year	Ray Jablonski, Rochester Red Wings	Shortstop

== See also ==
- 1952 Major League Baseball season
