= International League Top MLB Prospect Award =

- Sport: Baseball
- League: International League
- Awarded for: Best regular-season rookie in the International League
- Country: United States; Canada; Cuba
- Presented by: International League

History
- First award: Randy Jackson (1950)
- Most recent: Max Clark (2026)

The International League Top MLB Prospect Award is an annual award given to the best rookie player in Minor League Baseball's International League based on their regular-season performance as voted on by league managers. Broadcasters, Minor League Baseball executives, members of the media, coaches, and other representatives from the league's clubs have previously voted as well. Though the circuit was founded in 1884, it did not become known as the International League on a consistent basis until 1912. The first Rookie of the Year Award, as it was originally known, was not issued until 1950. After the cancellation of the 2020 season, the league was known as the Triple-A East in 2021 before reverting to the International League name in 2022. The Top MLB Prospect Award began to be issued instead of the Rookie of the Year Award in 2021.

Twenty-seven outfielders have won the award, the most of any position. First basemen, with 13 winners, have won the most among infielders, followed by third basemen and shortstops (10), and second basemen (4). Nine pitchers and three catchers have won the award.

Seventeen players who have won the Top MLB Prospect Award also won the International League Most Valuable Player Award (MVP) in the same season: Don Buford (1963), Joe Foy (1965), Mike Epstein (1966), Merv Rettenmund (1968), Luis Alvarado (1969), Roger Freed (1970), Jim Rice (1974), Mike Vail (1975), Rich Dauer (1976), Scott Bradley (1984), Dan Pasqua (1985), Randy Milligan (1987), J. T. Snow (1992), Chris Colabello (2013), Steven Souza Jr. (2014), Rhys Hoskins (2017), and Joey Meneses (2018). The only player to win the Top MLB Prospect Award and then later win the MVP Award is Ben Gamel, who was the 2015 Rookie of the Year and 2016 MVP. Of the nine pitchers who have won Top MLB Prospect, five also won the league's Pitcher of the Year Award (formerly the Most Valuable Pitcher Award) in the same season: Bob Trice (1953), Jason Isringhausen (1995), Brian Rose (1997), Brandon Duckworth (2001), and Julio Teherán (2011).

Seventeen players from the Rochester Red Wings have been selected for the Top MLB Prospect Award, more than any other team in the league, followed by the Syracuse Mets (7); the Columbus Clippers and Norfolk Tides (6); the Richmond Braves (5); the Scranton/Wilkes-Barre Highlanders (4); the Charlotte Knights, Gwinnett Stripers, and Pawtucket Red Sox (3); the original Buffalo Bisons, Durham Bulls, Lehigh Valley IronPigs, Louisville Bats, Memphis Redbirds, and Montreal Royals (2); and the Columbus Jets, Havana Sugar Kings, Indianapolis Indians, Louisville Colonels, Omaha Storm Chasers, Ottawa Athletics, Richmond Virginians, Springfield Cubs, Toledo Mud Hens, and Toronto Maple Leafs (International League) (1).

Twelve players from the Baltimore Orioles Major League Baseball (MLB) organization have won the award, more than any other, followed by the New York Yankees organization (10); the Atlanta Braves organization (8); the Philadelphia Phillies organization (6); the Boston Red Sox and St. Louis Cardinals organizations (5); the Minnesota Twins and New York Mets organizations (4); the Chicago White Sox and Cincinnati Reds organizations (3); the Detroit Tigers, Los Angeles Dodgers, Oakland Athletics, Tampa Bay Rays, and Toronto Blue Jays organizations (2); and the Chicago Cubs, Cleveland Guardians, Kansas City Royals, Miami Marlins, Pittsburgh Pirates, and Washington Nationals organizations (1).

== Winners ==
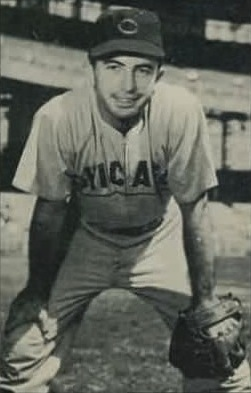
Randy Jackson won the first Rookie of the Year Award in 1950.

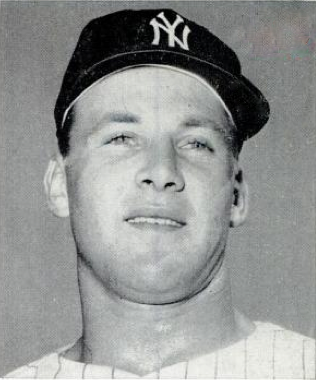
Tom Tresh, the 1961 winner, was selected as the 1962 American League Rookie of the Year.

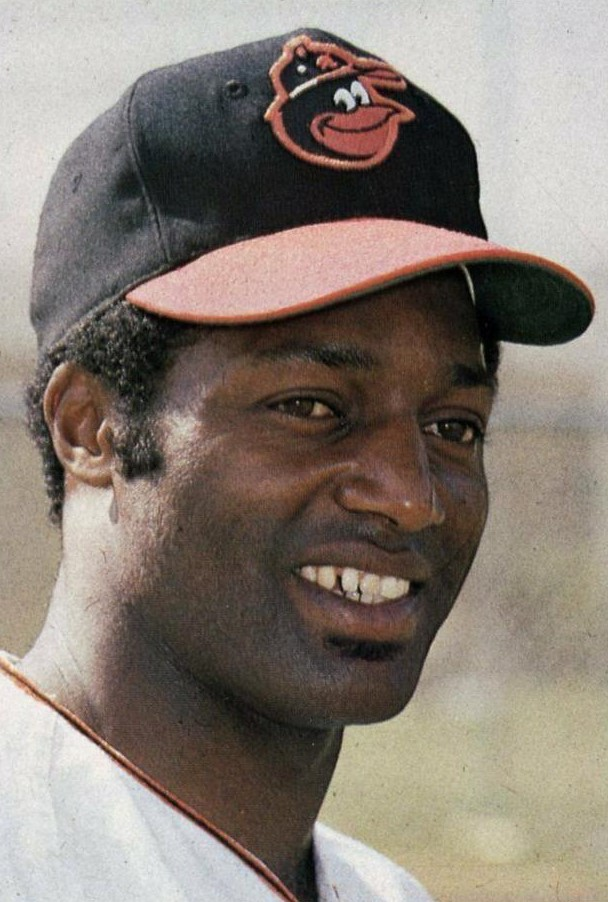
Don Buford was the first to win Rookie of the Year and the MVP Award in the same season (1963).

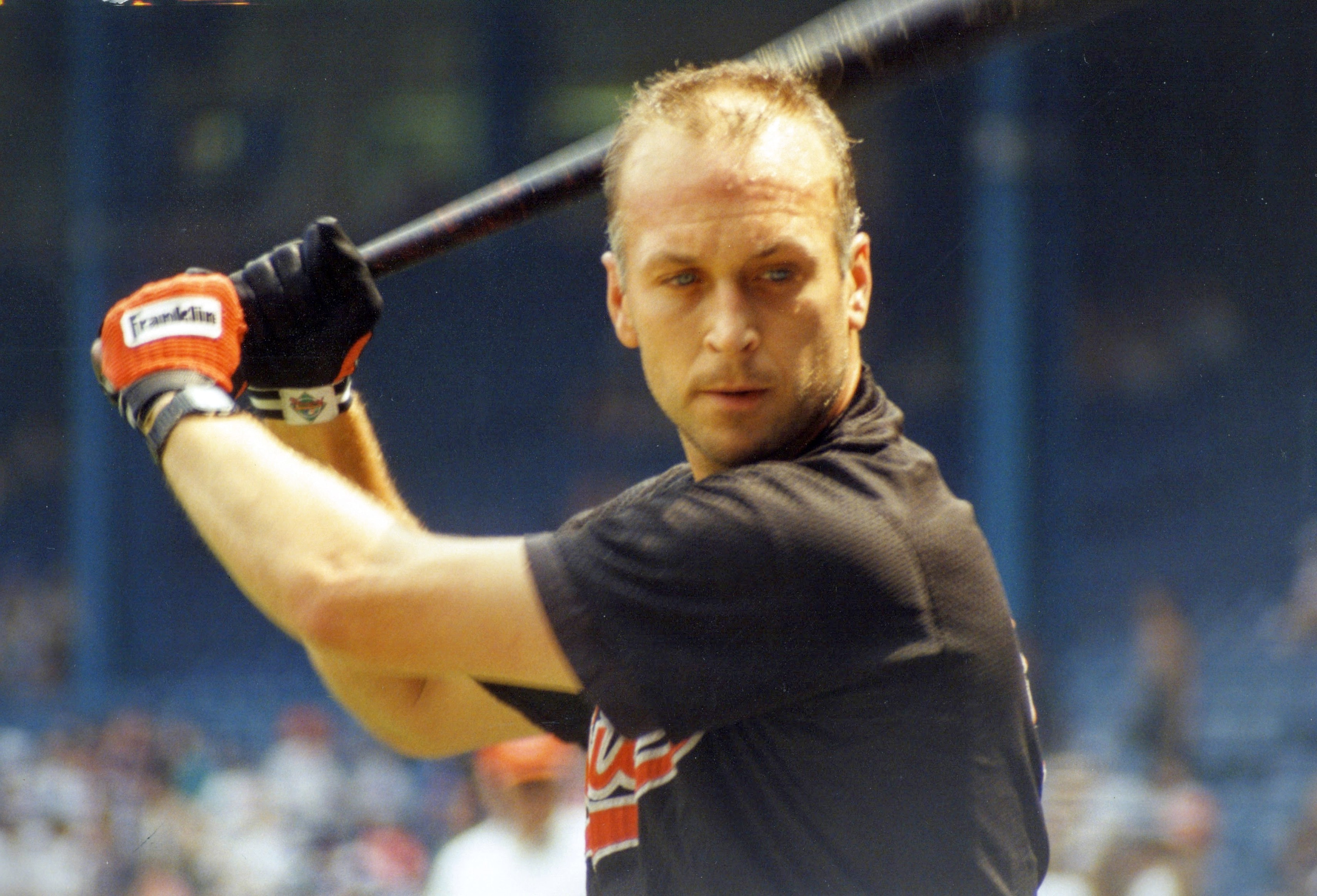
Cal Ripken Jr., the 1981 winner, won the 1982 American League Rookie of the Year Award.

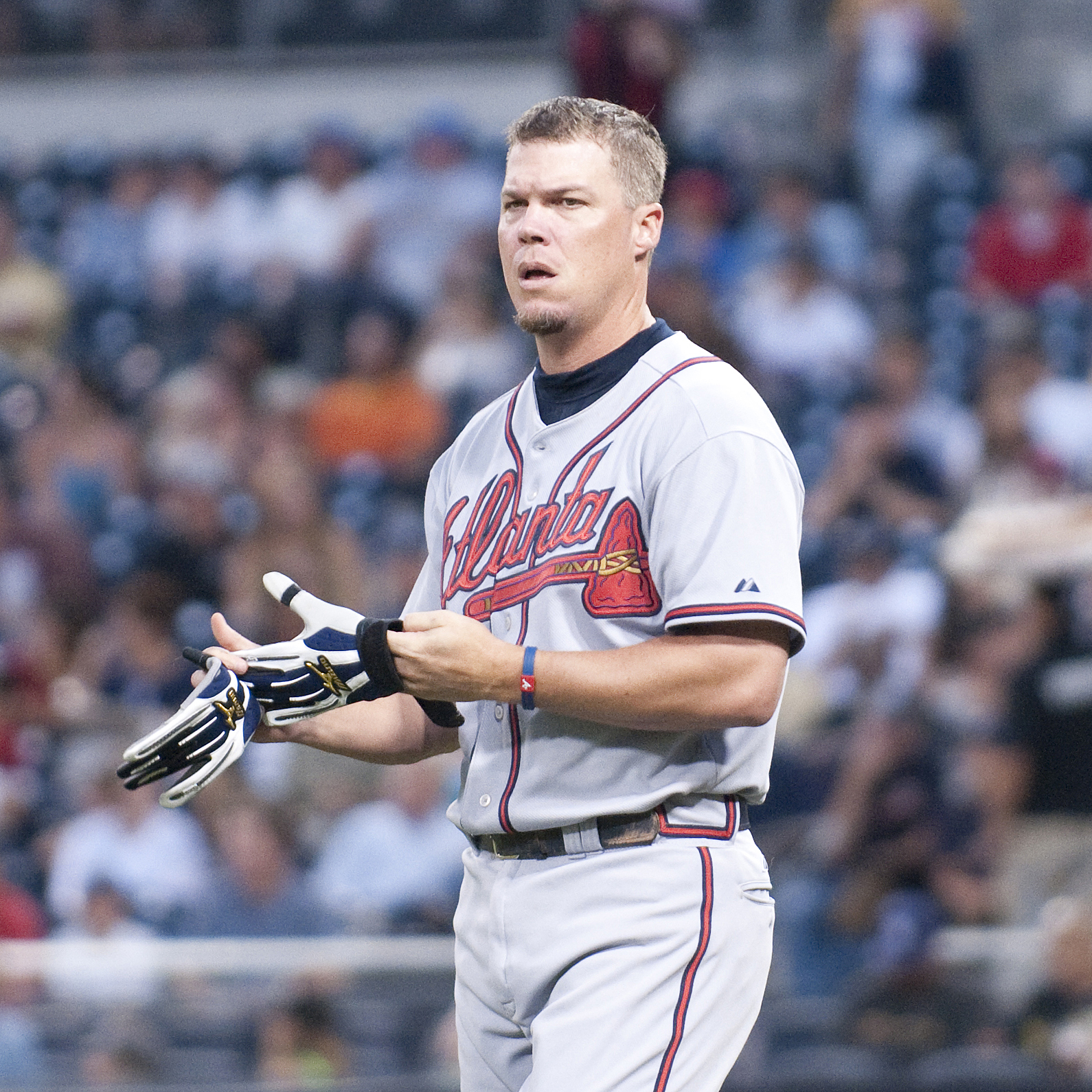
Chipper Jones, the 1993 Rookie of the Year, won the 1999 National League MVP Award and was inducted into the Baseball Hall of Fame in 2018.

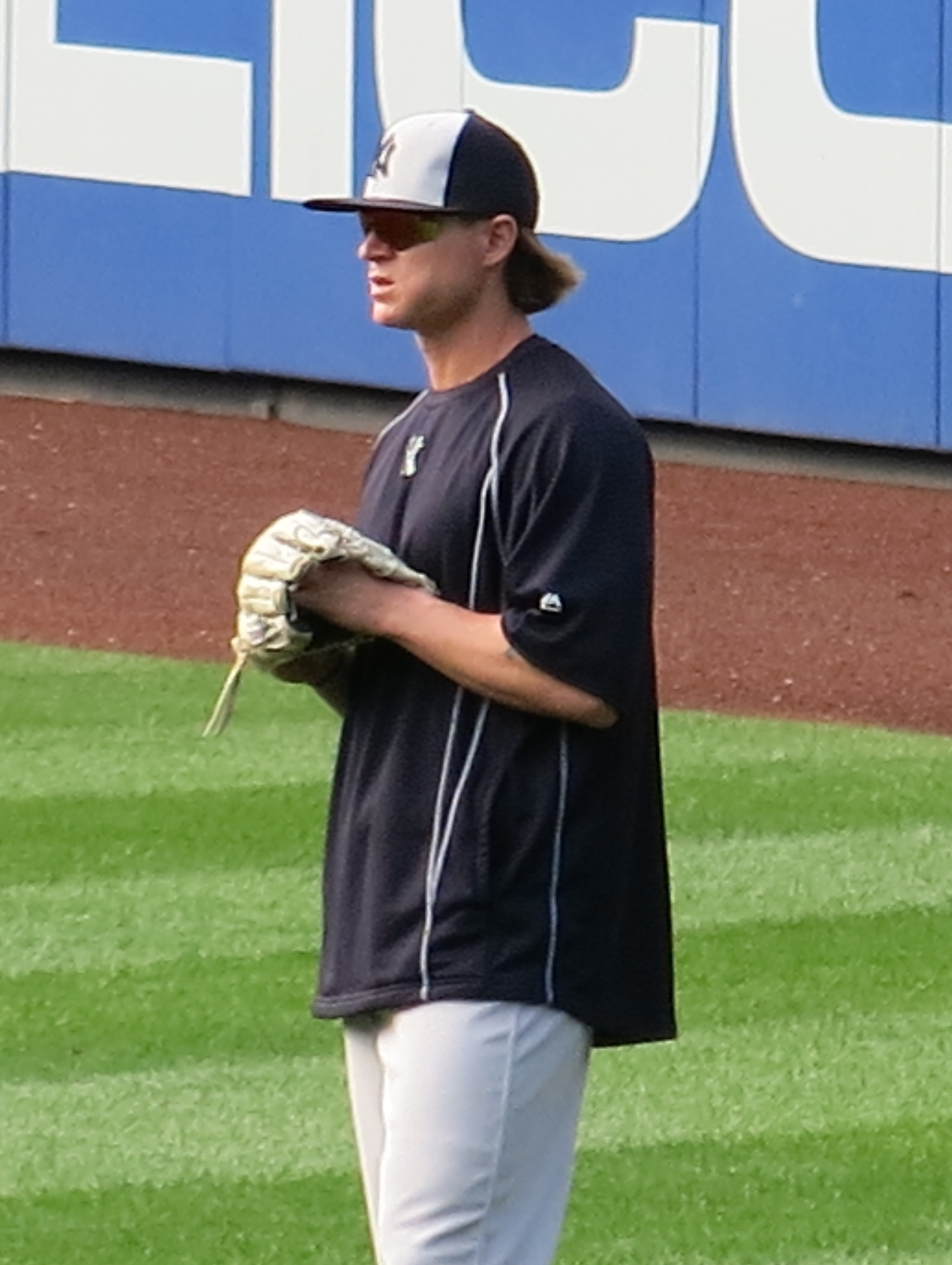
Ben Gamel was selected as Rookie of the Year in 2015 and won the MVP Award the next season.

Key
Position	Indicates the player's primary position

Winners
Year	Winner	Team	Organization	Position	Ref(s).
1950	Randy Jackson	Springfield Cubs	Chicago Cubs	Third baseman	
1951	Héctor Rodríguez	Montreal Royals	Brooklyn Dodgers	Third baseman	
1952	Ray Jablonski	Rochester Red Wings	St. Louis Cardinals	Shortstop	
1953	Bob Trice	Ottawa Athletics	Philadelphia Athletics	Pitcher	
1954	Jim Owens	Syracuse Chiefs	Philadelphia Phillies	Pitcher	
1955	Jackie Brandt	Rochester Red Wings	St. Louis Cardinals	Outfielder	
1956	Fred Kipp	Montreal Royals	Brooklyn Dodgers	Pitcher	
1957	Walt Craddock	Buffalo Bisons	Kansas City Athletics	Pitcher	
1958	Rogelio Álvarez	Havana Sugar Kings	Cincinnati Redlegs	First baseman	
1959	Charlie James	Rochester Red Wings	St. Louis Cardinals	Outfielder	
1960	Bobby Wine	Buffalo Bisons	Philadelphia Phillies	Shortstop	
1961	Tom Tresh	Richmond Virginians	New York Yankees	Shortstop	
1962	Bob Bailey	Columbus Jets	Pittsburgh Pirates	Third baseman	
1963	Don Buford	Indianapolis Indians	Chicago White Sox	Third baseman	
1964	Jim Northrup	Syracuse Chiefs	Detroit Tigers	Outfielder	
1965	Joe Foy	Toronto Maple Leafs	Boston Red Sox	Third baseman	
1966	Mike Epstein	Rochester Red Wings	Baltimore Orioles	First baseman	
1967	Curt Motton	Rochester Red Wings	Baltimore Orioles	Outfielder	
1968	Merv Rettenmund	Rochester Red Wings	Baltimore Orioles	Outfielder	
1969	Luis Alvarado	Louisville Colonels	Boston Red Sox	Shortstop	
1970	Roger Freed	Rochester Red Wings	Baltimore Orioles	Outfielder	
1971	Rusty Torres	Syracuse Chiefs	New York Yankees	Outfielder	
1972	Al Bumbry	Rochester Red Wings	Baltimore Orioles	Outfielder	
1973	Otto Vélez	Syracuse Chiefs	New York Yankees	Outfielder	
1974	Jim Rice	Pawtucket Red Sox	Boston Red Sox	Outfielder	
1975	Mike Vail	Tidewater Tides	New York Mets	Outfielder	
1976	Rich Dauer	Rochester Red Wings	Baltimore Orioles	Second baseman	
1977	Dale Murphy	Richmond Braves	Atlanta Braves	Catcher	
1978	Glenn Hubbard	Richmond Braves	Atlanta Braves	Second baseman	
1979	Mookie Wilson	Tidewater Tides	New York Mets	Outfielder	
1980	Bobby Bonner	Rochester Red Wings	Baltimore Orioles	Shortstop	
1981	Cal Ripken Jr.	Rochester Red Wings	Baltimore Orioles	Third baseman	
1982	Brook Jacoby	Richmond Braves	Atlanta Braves	Third baseman	
1983	Brad Komminsk	Richmond Braves	Atlanta Braves	Outfielder	
1984	Scott Bradley	Columbus Clippers	New York Yankees	Catcher	
1985	Dan Pasqua	Columbus Clippers	New York Yankees	Outfielder	
1986	Orestes Destrade	Columbus Clippers	New York Yankees	First baseman	
1987	Randy Milligan	Tidewater Tides	New York Mets	First baseman	
1988	Steve Finley	Rochester Red Wings	Baltimore Orioles	Outfielder	
1989	Francisco Cabrera	Syracuse Chiefs	Toronto Blue Jays	Catcher	
1990	Phil Plantier	Pawtucket Red Sox	Boston Red Sox	Outfielder	
1991	Luis Mercedes	Rochester Red Wings	Baltimore Orioles	Outfielder	
1992	J. T. Snow	Columbus Clippers	New York Yankees	First baseman	
1993	Chipper Jones	Richmond Braves	Atlanta Braves	Shortstop	
1994	Shawn Green	Syracuse Chiefs	Toronto Blue Jays	Outfielder	
1995	Jason Isringhausen	Norfolk Tides	New York Mets	Pitcher	
1996	Billy McMillon	Charlotte Knights	Florida Marlins	Outfielder	
1997	Brian Rose	Pawtucket Red Sox	Boston Red Sox	Pitcher	
1998	Marlon Anderson	Scranton/Wilkes-Barre Red Barons	Philadelphia Phillies	Second baseman	
1999	Kurt Bierek	Columbus Clippers	New York Yankees	First baseman	
2000	Aubrey Huff	Durham Bulls	Tampa Bay Devil Rays	Third baseman	
2001	Brandon Duckworth	Scranton/Wilkes-Barre Red Barons	Philadelphia Phillies	Pitcher	
2002	Carl Crawford	Durham Bulls	Tampa Bay Devil Rays	Outfielder	
2003	Aaron Miles	Charlotte Knights	Chicago White Sox	Second baseman	
2004	Jason Kubel	Rochester Red Wings	Minnesota Twins	Outfielder	
2005	Francisco Liriano	Rochester Red Wings	Minnesota Twins	Pitcher	
2006	Josh Fields	Charlotte Knights	Chicago White Sox	Third baseman	
2007	Joey Votto	Louisville Bats	Cincinnati Reds	First baseman	
2008	Randy Ruiz	Rochester Red Wings	Minnesota Twins	First baseman	
2009	Austin Jackson	Scranton/Wilkes-Barre Yankees	New York Yankees	Outfielder	
2010	Freddie Freeman	Gwinnett Braves	Atlanta Braves	First baseman	
2011	Julio Teherán	Gwinnett Braves	Atlanta Braves	Pitcher	
2012	Ernesto Mejía	Gwinnett Braves	Atlanta Braves	First baseman	
2013	Chris Colabello	Rochester Red Wings	Minnesota Twins	First baseman	
2014	Steven Souza Jr.	Syracuse Chiefs	Washington Nationals	Outfielder	
2015	Ben Gamel	Scranton/Wilkes-Barre RailRiders	New York Yankees	Outfielder	
2016	Yandy Díaz	Columbus Clippers	Cleveland Indians	Outfielder	
2017	Rhys Hoskins	Lehigh Valley IronPigs	Philadelphia Phillies	First baseman	
2018	Joey Meneses	Lehigh Valley IronPigs	Philadelphia Phillies	First baseman	
2019	Aristides Aquino	Louisville Bats	Cincinnati Reds	Outfielder	
2020	None selected (season cancelled due to COVID-19 pandemic)				
2021	Bobby Witt Jr.	Omaha Storm Chasers	Kansas City Royals	Shortstop	
2022	Gunnar Henderson	Norfolk Tides	Baltimore Orioles	Shortstop	
2023	Masyn Winn	Memphis Redbirds	St. Louis Cardinals	Shortstop	
2024	Coby Mayo	Norfolk Tides	Baltimore Orioles	Third baseman	
2025	JJ Wetherholt	Memphis Redbirds	St. Louis Cardinals	Shortstop	
2026	Max Clark	Toledo Mud Hens	Detroit Tigers	Outfielder	

== Wins by team ==
Active International League teams appear in bold.

Team	Award(s)	Year(s)
**Rochester Red Wings**	17	1952, 1955, 1959, 1966, 1967, 1968, 1970, 1972, 1976, 1980, 1981, 1988, 1991, 2004, 2005, 2008, 2013
**Syracuse Mets** (Syracuse Chiefs)	7	1954, 1964, 1971, 1973, 1989, 1994, 2014
**Columbus Clippers**	6	1984, 1985, 1986, 1992, 1999, 2016
**Norfolk Tides** (Tidewater Tides)	6	1975, 1979, 1987, 1995, 2022, 2024
Richmond Braves	5	1977, 1978, 1982, 1983, 1993
**Scranton/Wilkes-Barre Highlanders** (Scranton/Wilkes-Barre Red Barons/Yankees/RailRiders)	4	1998, 2001, 2009, 2015
**Charlotte Knights**	3	1996, 2003, 2006
**Gwinnett Stripers** (Gwinnett Braves)	3	2010, 2011, 2012
Pawtucket Red Sox	3	1974, 1990, 1997
Buffalo Bisons (1886–1970)	2	1957, 1960
**Durham Bulls**	2	2000, 2002
**Lehigh Valley IronPigs**	2	2017, 2018
**Louisville Bats**	2	2007, 2019
**Memphis Redbirds**	2	2023, 2025
Montreal Royals	2	1951, 1956
Columbus Jets	1	1962
Havana Sugar Kings	1	1958
**Indianapolis Indians**	1	1963
Louisville Colonels	1	1969
**Omaha Storm Chasers**	1	2021
Ottawa Athletics	1	1953
Richmond Virginians	1	1961
Springfield Cubs	1	1950
**Toledo Mud Hens**	1	2026
Toronto Maple Leafs	1	1965

== Wins by organization ==
Active International League–Major League Baseball affiliations appear in bold.

Organization	Award(s)	Year(s)
**Baltimore Orioles**	12	1966, 1967, 1968, 1970, 1972, 1976, 1980, 1981, 1988, 1991, 2022, 2024
**New York Yankees**	10	1961, 1971, 1973, 1984, 1985, 1986, 1992, 1999, 2009, 2015
**Atlanta Braves**	8	1977, 1978, 1982, 1983, 1993, 2010, 2011, 2012
**Philadelphia Phillies**	6	1954, 1960, 1998, 2001, 2017, 2018
**Boston Red Sox**	5	1965, 1969, 1974, 1990, 1997
**St. Louis Cardinals**	5	1952, 1955, 1959, 2023, 2025
**Minnesota Twins**	4	2004, 2005, 2008, 2013
**New York Mets**	4	1975, 1979, 1987, 1995
**Chicago White Sox**	3	1963, 2003, 2006
**Cincinnati Reds** (Cincinnati Redlegs)	3	1958, 2007, 2019
**Detroit Tigers**	2	1964, 2026
Los Angeles Dodgers (Brooklyn Dodgers)	2	1951, 1956
Oakland Athletics (Philadelphia/Kansas City Athletics)	2	1953, 1957
**Tampa Bay Rays** (Tampa Bay Devil Rays)	2	2000, 2002
**Toronto Blue Jays**	2	1989, 1994
**Chicago Cubs**	1	1950
**Cleveland Guardians** (Cleveland Indians)	1	2016
**Kansas City Royals**	1	2021
**Miami Marlins** (Florida Marlins)	1	1996
**Pittsburgh Pirates**	1	1962
**Washington Nationals**	1	2014
