= Ben Gamel =

American baseball player (born 1992)

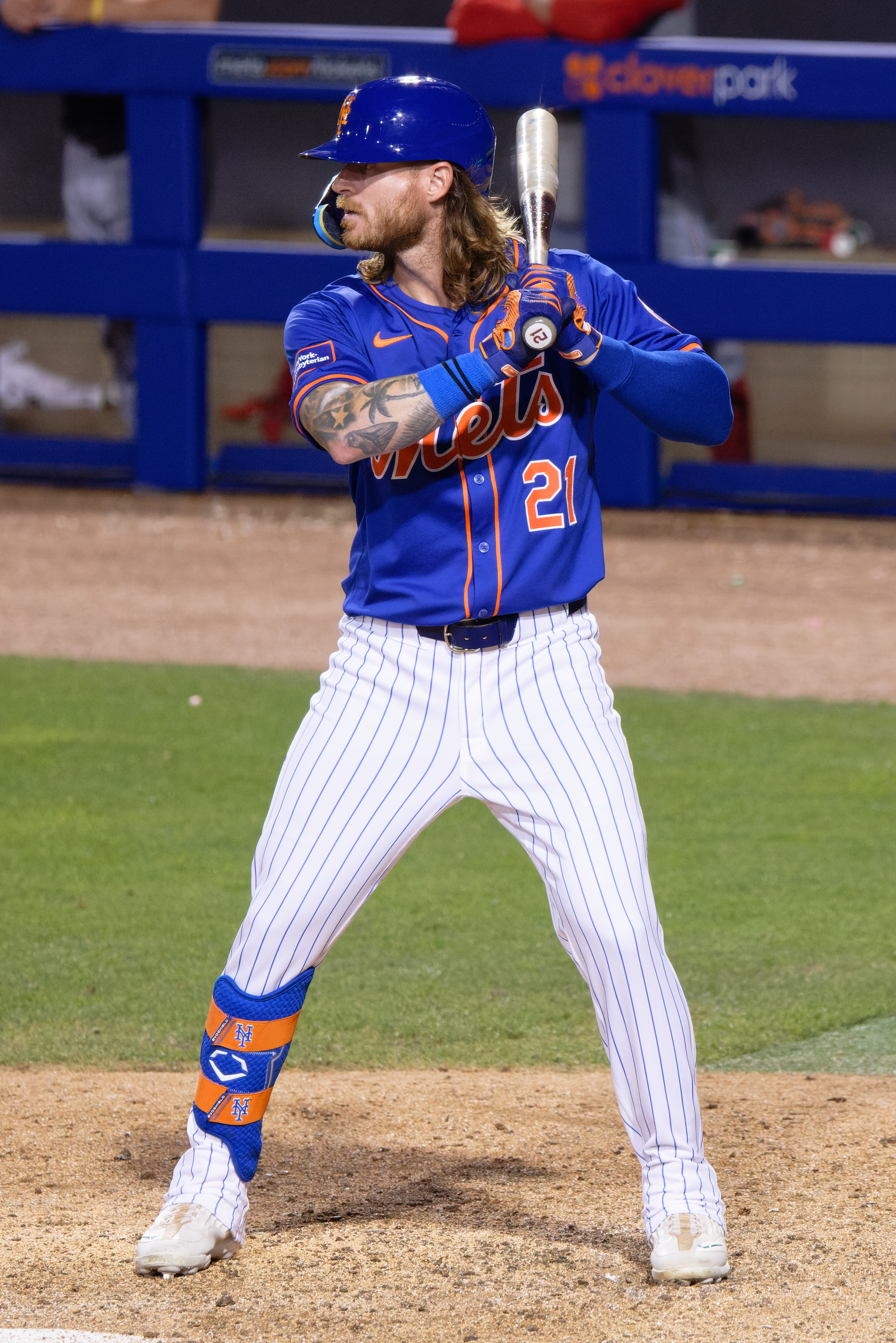
- Gamel with the Mets in 2024

Free agent
- Outfielder
- Born: May 17, 1992 (age 34); Neptune Beach, Florida, U.S.
- Bats: Left Throws: Left

MLB debut
- May 6, 2016, for the New York Yankees

MLB statistics (through 2024 season)
- Batting average: .252
- Home runs: 41
- Runs batted in: 204
- Stats at Baseball Reference

Teams
- New York Yankees (2016); Seattle Mariners (2016–2018); Milwaukee Brewers (2019–2020); Cleveland Indians (2021); Pittsburgh Pirates (2021–2022); San Diego Padres (2023); New York Mets (2024); Houston Astros (2024)

Benjamin Joseph Gamel (born May 17, 1992) is an American professional baseball outfielder who is a free agent. He has previously played in Major League Baseball (MLB) for the New York Yankees, Seattle Mariners, Milwaukee Brewers, Cleveland Indians, Pittsburgh Pirates, San Diego Padres, New York Mets, and Houston Astros. He made his MLB debut in 2016.

== Career ==
=== Early life ===
Gamel attended Bishop Kenny High School in Jacksonville, Florida. He committed to play college baseball at Florida State University.

=== New York Yankees ===
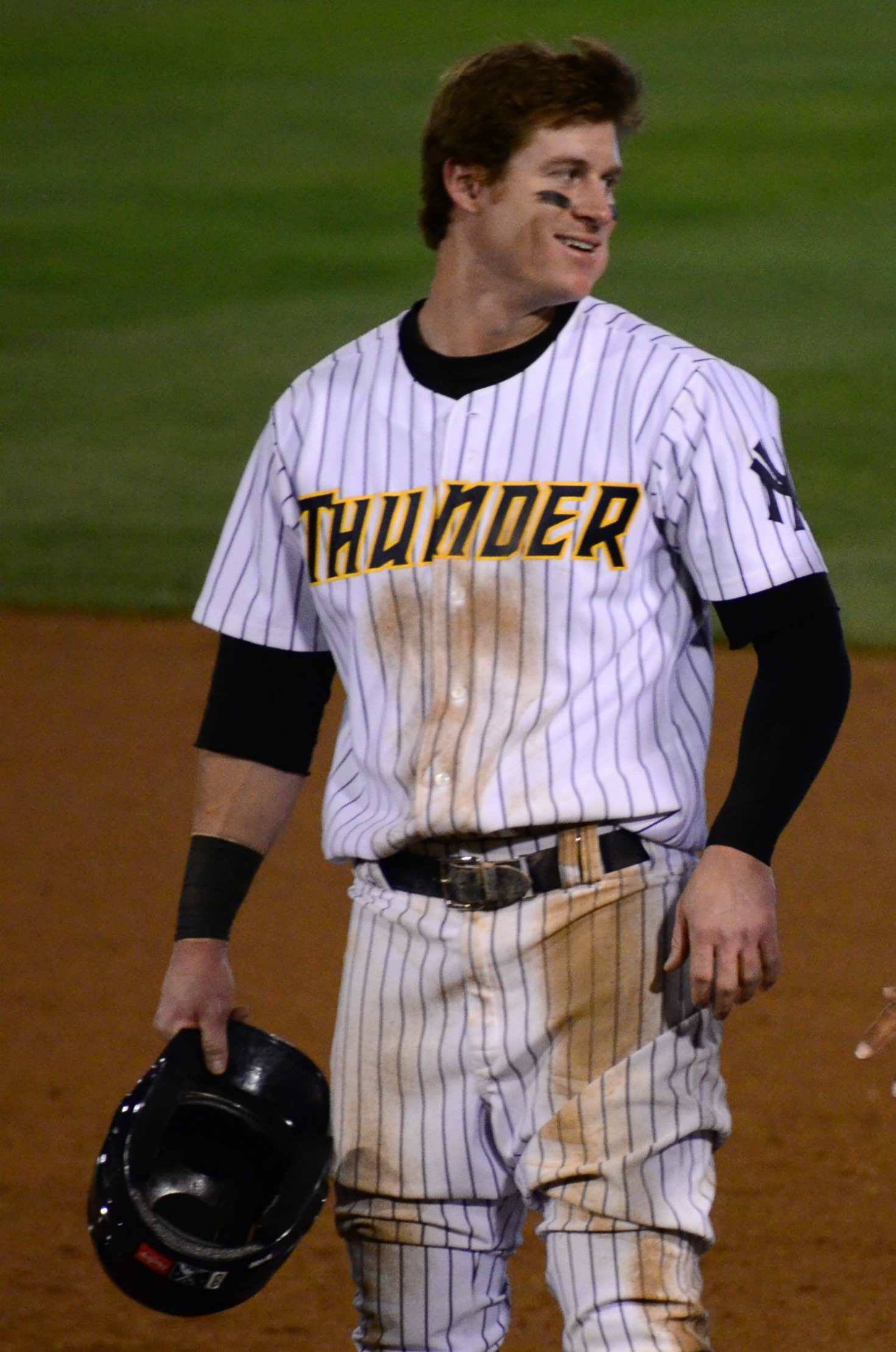
Gamel with the Trenton Thunder

The New York Yankees selected Gamel in the 10th round of the 2010 Major League Baseball draft. He signed with the Yankees and made his professional debut with the Gulf Coast Yankees of the Rookie-level Gulf Coast League. He played in 2011 for the Staten Island Yankees of the Low-A New York-Penn League and in 2012 with the Charleston RiverDogs of the Single-A South Atlantic League. He began the 2013 season with the Tampa Yankees of the High-A Florida State League before being promoted to the Trenton Thunder of the Double-A Eastern League. He returned to Trenton in 2014 and played for the Scranton/Wilkes-Barre RailRiders of the Triple-A International League in 2015. The Yankees added him to their 40-man roster after the 2015 season.

After attending spring training, Gamel began the 2016 season with Scranton/Wilkes-Barre. The Yankees promoted Gamel to the major leagues on May 5, and he made his major league debut as a defensive replacement on May 6. He spent the majority of the 2016 season with Scranton/Wilkes-Barre, and won the International League Most Valuable Player Award.

=== Seattle Mariners ===
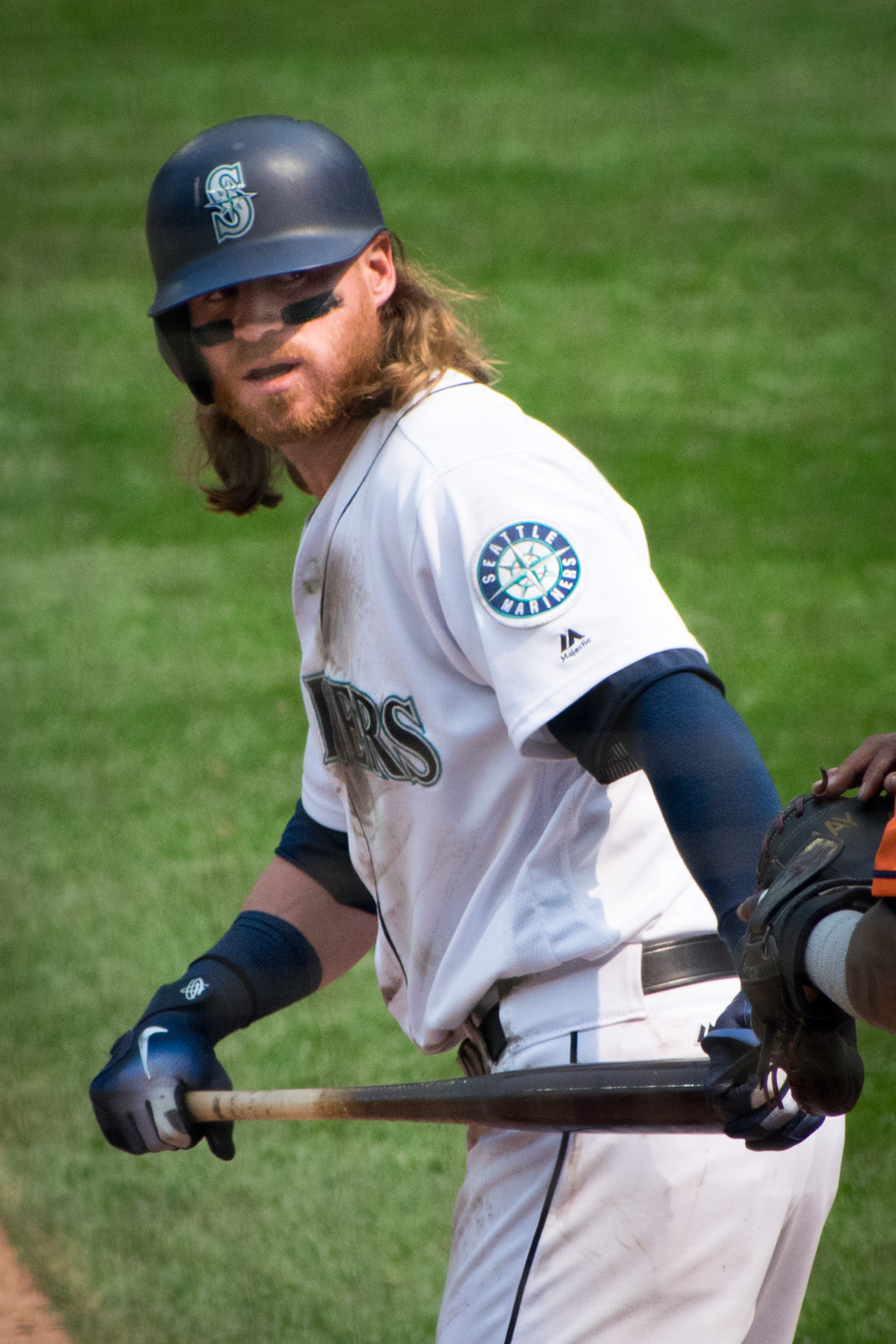
Gamel with the Mariners in 2017

On August 31, 2016, the Seattle Mariners acquired Gamel from the Yankees for minor league pitchers Jio Orozco and Juan De Paula. In 2017, Gamel played in 134 games for Seattle, slashing .275/.322/.413 with 11 home runs and 59 RBI over 509 at-bats. He hit .272/.358/.370 with one homer and 19 RBI over 257 at-bats in 101 games for the Mariners in 2018.

=== Milwaukee Brewers ===
On December 21, 2018, the Mariners traded Gamel and Noah Zavolas to the Milwaukee Brewers for Domingo Santana. Gamel played in 134 games for the Brewers in 2019, slashing .248/.337/.373 with 7 home runs and 33 RBI over 311 at-bats. In 2020, Gamel appeared in 40 contests, hitting .237/.315/.404 with 3 home runs and 10 RBI in 114 at-bats. On December 2, 2020, Gamel was non-tendered by the Brewers, making him a free agent.

=== Cleveland Indians ===
On February 11, 2021, Gamel signed a minor league contract with the Cleveland Indians organization that included an invitation to spring training. The Indians selected Gamel's contract on March 27. Gamel was designated for assignment on May 5, after going 1-for-14 (.071) with no home runs or RBI in 11 games.

=== Pittsburgh Pirates ===
On May 9, 2021, Gamel was claimed off waivers by the Pittsburgh Pirates. In 111 games for the Pirates, Gamel batted .255/.352/.399 with 8 home runs and 26 RBI. During the 2022 season, Gamel appeared in 155 games for the Pirates, batting .232/.324/.369 with 9 home runs and 46 RBI. On November 6, 2022, Gamel was granted free agency.

=== Tampa Bay Rays ===
On February 22, 2023, Gamel signed a minor league contract with the Tampa Bay Rays organization. In 59 games for the Triple-A Durham Bulls, Gamel hit .276/.402/.463 with 8 home runs and 31 RBI.

=== San Diego Padres ===
On July 13, 2023, Gamel was traded to the San Diego Padres. In 18 games for the Triple-A El Paso Chihuahuas, he batted .314/.402/.600 with 5 home runs and 13 RBI. On August 14, the Padres selected Gamel's contract, adding him to the major league roster. Gamel went 3-for-15 (.200) in 6 games for the Padres before he was designated for assignment on September 7. He cleared waivers and was sent outright to El Paso on September 9. However, Gamel rejected the assignment and instead elected free agency.

=== New York Mets ===
On February 12, 2024, Gamel signed a minor league contract with the New York Mets. In 45 games for the Triple-A Syracuse Mets, he batted .314/.423/.539 with 7 home runs and 24 RBI. On June 25, the Mets selected Gamel's contract, adding him to their active roster to replace Starling Marte after he was placed on the injured list. In 18 games for the Mets, Gamel hit .217/.400/.261 with no home runs, no RBI, and one stolen base. Upon Marte's return on August 18, Gamel was designated for assignment.

=== Houston Astros ===
On August 20, 2024, the Houston Astros claimed Gamel off waivers from the Mets. He made his Astros debut on August 22, collecting two hits and driving in two runs as the Astros defeated the Baltimore Orioles, 6–0. On September 17, the Astros placed Gamel on the 10-day IL with a fractured left fibula sustained after running into the outfield wall to make a catch at Angel Stadium. Gamel slashed 259/.377/.362 with one home run and 4 RBI over 20 games with the Astros. Following the season, he elected free agency.

On February 5, 2025, Gamel re-signed with the Astros on a one-year, $1.2 million contract. However, he was released prior to the start of the season on March 22.

=== Detroit Tigers ===
On March 26, 2025, Gamel signed a minor league contract with the Detroit Tigers. In 17 games for the Triple-A Toledo Mud Hens, he batted .262/.375/.344 with four RBI and two stolen bases. The Tigers released Gamel on May 21.

=== Los Angeles Angels ===
On June 7, 2025, Gamel signed a minor league contract with the Los Angeles Angels. In 32 appearances for the Triple-A Salt Lake Bees, he batted .282/.417/.612 with eight home runs and 15 RBI. Gamel elected free agency following the season on November 6.

=== Atlanta Braves ===
On December 5, 2025, Gamel signed a minor league contract with the Atlanta Braves. In 57 games for the Triple-A Gwinnett Stripers, he batted .210/.333/.328 with three home runs and 20 RBI. Gamel was released by the Braves on August 3.

== Personal life ==
Gamel's older brother, Mat Gamel, played five seasons in Major League Baseball for the Milwaukee Brewers. Gamel and his wife, Lauren, had their first child in March 2022.
