= International League Pitcher of the Year Award =

- Sport: Baseball
- League: International League
- Awarded for: Best regular-season pitcher in the International League
- Country: United States; Canada
- Presented by: International League

History
- First award: Bob Trice (1953)
- Most recent: Brendan Beck (2026)

The International League Pitcher of the Year Award is an annual award given to the best pitcher in Minor League Baseball's International League based on their regular-season performance as voted on by league managers. Broadcasters, Minor League Baseball executives, members of the media, coaches, and other representatives from the league's clubs have previously voted as well. Though the circuit was founded in 1884, it did not become known as the International League on a consistent basis until 1912. The first Most Valuable Pitcher Award, as it was originally known, was not issued until 1953. After the cancellation of the 2020 season, the league was called the Triple-A East in 2021 before reverting to the International League name in 2022. The award became known as the Pitcher of the Year Award in 2021.

From 1932 to 1952, pitchers were eligible to win the International League Most Valuable Player Award (MVP) as no award was designated for pitchers. Four pitchers won the MVP Award: Mike Ryba (1940), Fred Hutchinson (1941), Red Barrett (1942), and Tom Poholsky (1950). Nine pitchers have also won the league's Top MLB Prospect Award (formerly the Rookie of the Year Award): Bob Trice (1953), Jim Owens (1954), Fred Kipp (1956), Walt Craddock (1957), Jason Isringhausen (1995), Brian Rose (1997), Brandon Duckworth (2001), Francisco Liriano (2005), and Julio Teherán (2011). Trice, Isringhausen, Rose, Duckworth, and Teherán each won the Most Valuable Pitcher and Rookie of the Year Awards in the same season.

Seven players from the Pawtucket Red Sox and Rochester Red Wings have each been selected for the Pitcher of the Year Award, more than any other teams in the league, followed by the Columbus Clippers, Norfolk Tides, and Syracuse Mets (6); the Indianapolis Indians, Lehigh Valley IronPigs, and Toronto Maple Leafs (5); the Scranton/Wilkes-Barre Highlanders (4); the Charlotte Knights and Columbus Jets (3); the Durham Bulls, Nashville Sounds, Richmond Braves, Richmond Virginians, and Toledo Mud Hens (2); and the Charleston Charlies, Gwinnett Stripers, Jacksonville Jumbo Shrimp, Louisville Bats, Montreal Royals, Omaha Storm Chasers, Ottawa Athletics, and St. Paul Saints (1).

Thirteen players from the New York Yankees Major League Baseball (MLB) organization have won the award, more than any other, followed by the Boston Red Sox organization (8); the Philadelphia Phillies and Pittsburgh Pirates organizations (7); the New York Mets organization (6); the Baltimore Orioles organization (5); the Chicago White Sox organization (4); the Atlanta Braves, Milwaukee Brewers, Minnesota Twins, and Toronto Blue Jays organizations (3); the Cleveland Guardians and Tampa Bay Rays organizations (2); and the Cincinnati Reds, Detroit Tigers, Kansas City Royals, Los Angeles Dodgers, Oakland Athletics, and St. Louis Cardinals organizations (1). Three award winners played for teams that were not affiliated with any MLB organization.

== Winners ==
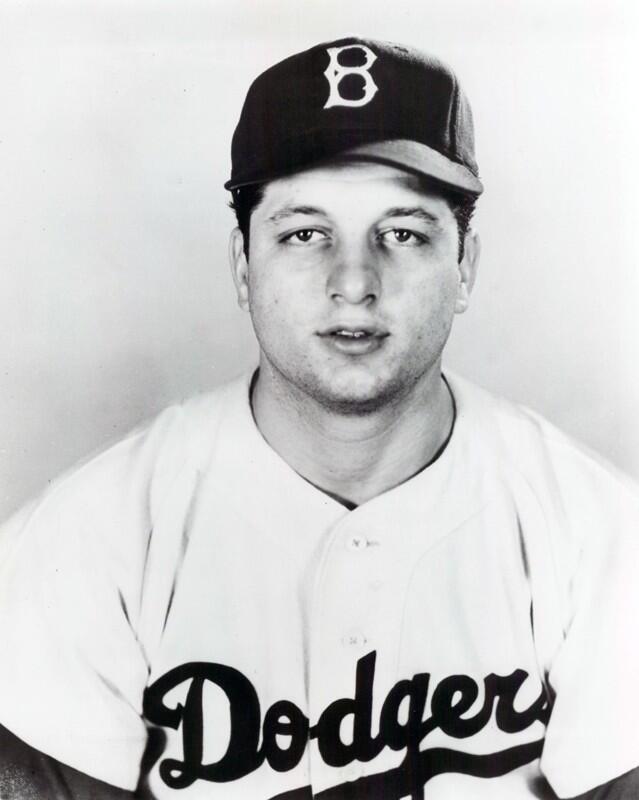
Tommy Lasorda, the 1958 winner, was inducted into the Baseball Hall of Fame in 1997.

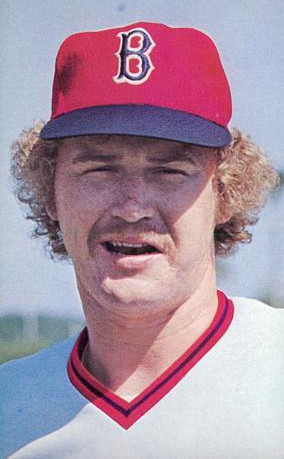
Dick Pole won in 1973 after recording a no-hitter for the Pawtucket Red Sox on June 23.

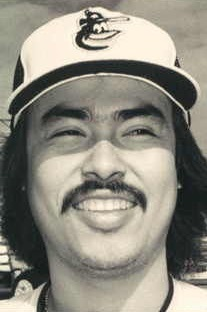
Dennis Martínez, the 1976 winner, pitched a perfect game for the Montreal Expos in 1991.

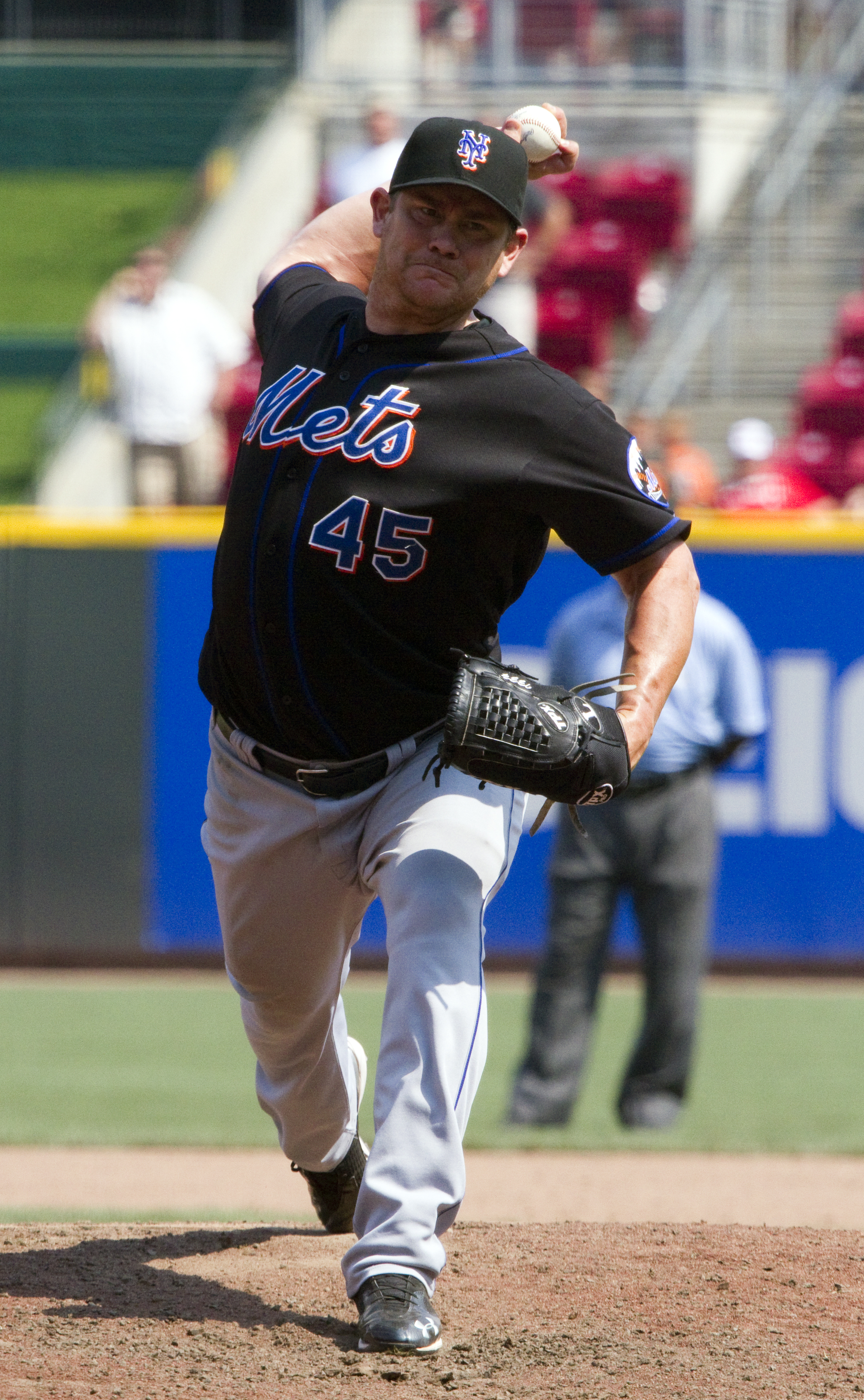
Jason Isringhausen won the Most Valuable Pitcher and Rookie of the Year Awards in 1995.

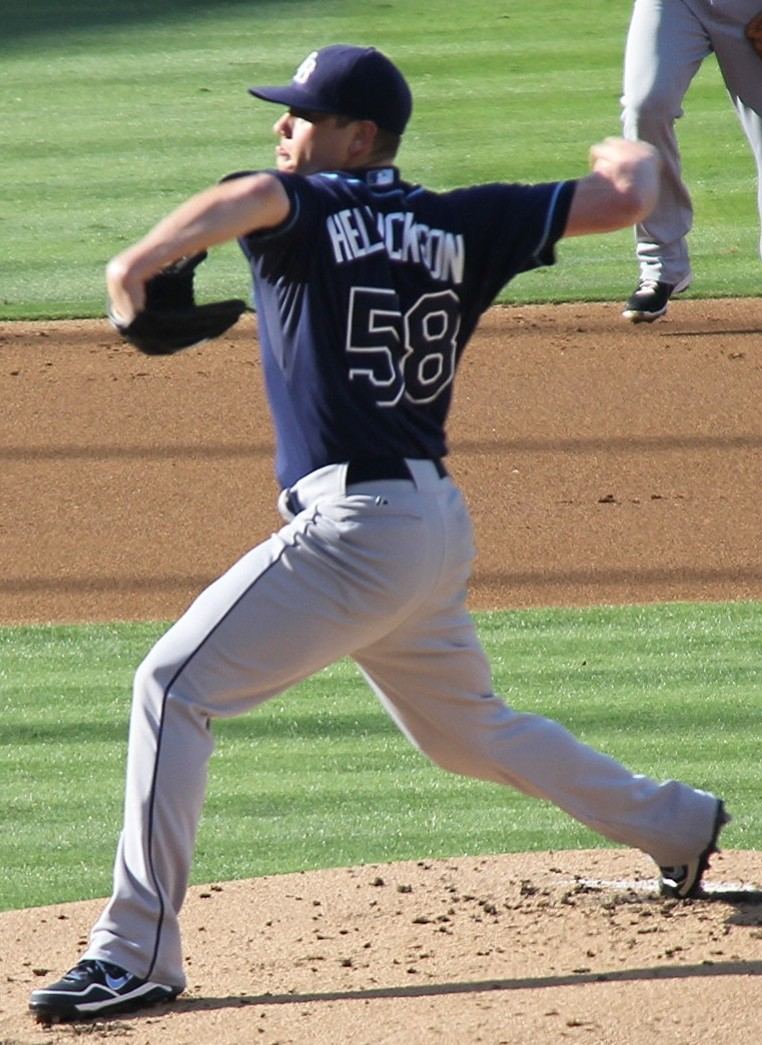
Jeremy Hellickson, who won in 2010, won the AL Rookie of the Year Award the next season.

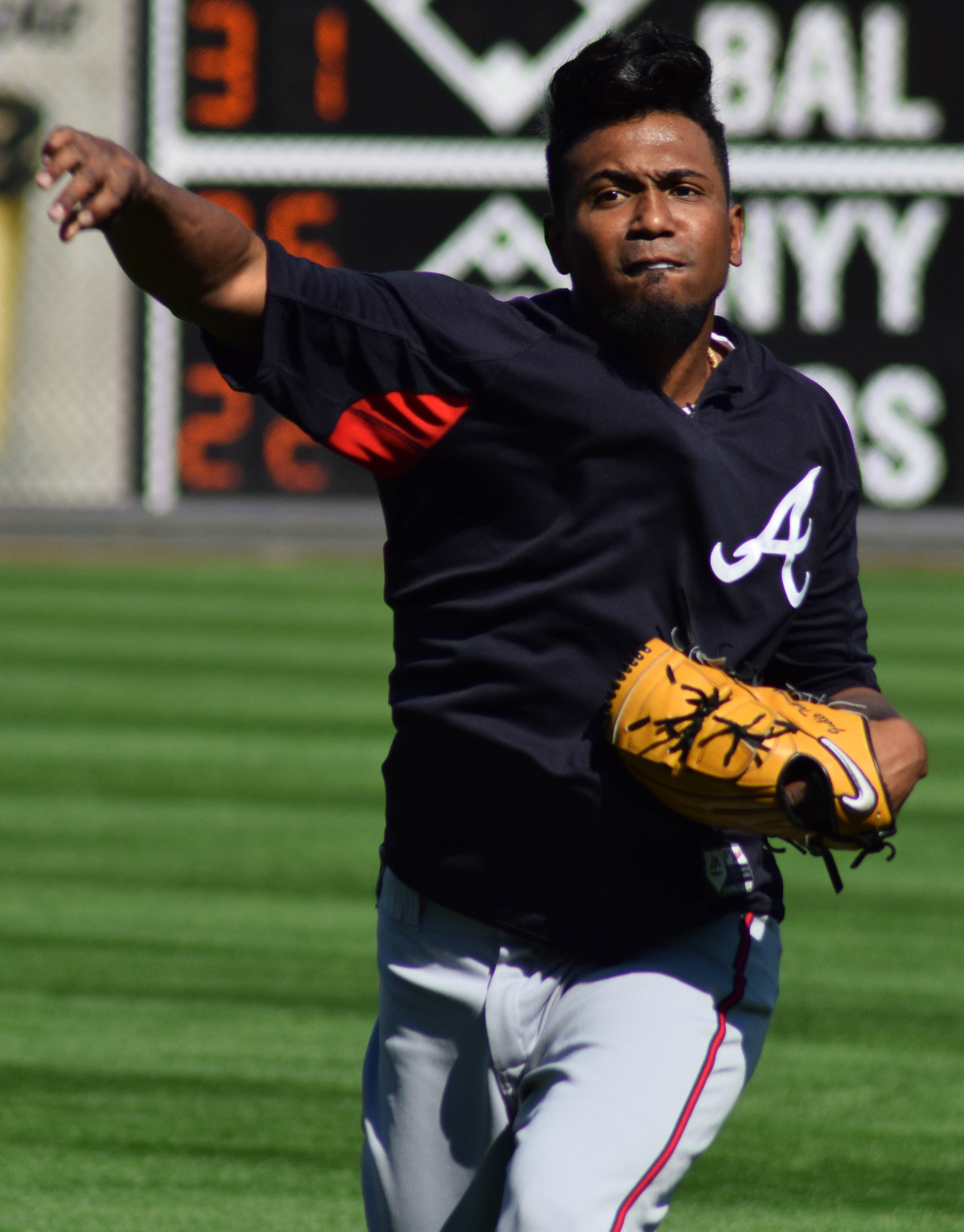
Julio Teherán won the 2011 Most Valuable Pitcher and Rookie of the Year Awards.

Key
Record	The pitcher's win–loss record during the regular season
Saves	The number of saves earned by the pitcher, if any, during the regular season
ERA	The pitcher's earned run average (ERA) during the regular season
SO	The number of strikeouts recorded by the pitcher during the regular season

Winners
Year	Winner	Team	Organization	Record	Saves	ERA	SO	Ref(s).
1953	Bob Trice	Ottawa Athletics	Philadelphia Athletics	21–10	0	3.10	57	
1954	Tony Jacobs	Rochester Red Wings	St. Louis Cardinals	13–1	0	2.91	48	
1955	Jack Crimian	Toronto Maple Leafs	—	19–6	0	2.10	84	
1956	Lynn Lovenguth	Toronto Maple Leafs	—	24–12	0	2.68	153	
1957	Don Johnson	Toronto Maple Leafs	—	17–7	0	2.96	92	
1958	Tommy Lasorda	Montreal Royals	Los Angeles Dodgers	18–6	0	2.50	126	
1959	Bill Short	Richmond Virginians	New York Yankees	17–6	0	2.48	133	
1960	Al Cicotte	Toronto Maple Leafs	Cleveland Indians	16–7	0	1.79	158	
1961	Diomedes Olivo	Columbus Jets	Pittsburgh Pirates	11–7	0	2.01	118	
1962	Joe Schaffernoth	Jacksonville Suns	Cleveland Indians	18–11	0	2.67	160	
1963	Fritz Ackley	Indianapolis Indians	Chicago White Sox	18–5	0	2.76	138	
1964	Mel Stottlemyre	Richmond Virginians	New York Yankees	13–3	0	1.42	95	
1965	Sam Jones	Columbus Jets	Pittsburgh Pirates	12–4	0	3.04	65	
1966	Gary Waslewski	Toronto Maple Leafs	Boston Red Sox	18–11	0	2.52	165	
1967	Dave Leonhard	Rochester Red Wings	Baltimore Orioles	15–3	0	2.61	108	
1968	Dave Roberts	Columbus Jets	Pittsburgh Pirates	18–5	0	3.17	133	
1969	Ron Klimkowski	Syracuse Chiefs	New York Yankees	15–7	0	2.18	57	
1970	Rob Gardner	Syracuse Chiefs	New York Yankees	16–5	2	2.53	126	
1971	Roric Harrison	Rochester Red Wings	Baltimore Orioles	15–5	0	2.81	182	
1972	Gene Garber	Charleston Charlies	Pittsburgh Pirates	14–3	0	2.26	103	
1973	Dick Pole	Pawtucket Red Sox	Boston Red Sox	12–9	0	2.03	158	
1974	Scott McGregor	Syracuse Chiefs	New York Yankees	13–10	0	3.44	124	
1975	Craig Swan	Tidewater Tides	New York Mets	13–7	2	2.24	111	
1976	Dennis Martínez	Rochester Red Wings	Baltimore Orioles	14–8	0	2.50	140	
1977	Mike Parrott	Rochester Red Wings	Baltimore Orioles	15–7	0	3.42	146	
1978	Juan Berenguer	Tidewater Tides	New York Mets	10–7	0	3.67	130	
1979	Rick Anderson	Columbus Clippers	New York Yankees	13–3	21	1.63	72	
1980	Bob Kammeyer	Columbus Clippers	New York Yankees	15–7	0	2.91	72	
1981	Bob Ojeda	Pawtucket Red Sox	Boston Red Sox	12–9	0	2.13	113	
1982	Craig McMurtry	Richmond Braves	Atlanta Braves	17–9	0	3.81	96	
1983	Walt Terrell	Tidewater Tides	New York Mets	10–1	0	3.12	58	
1984	Brad Havens	Toledo Mud Hens	Minnesota Twins	11–10	0	2.61	169	
1985	Tom Henke	Syracuse Chiefs	Toronto Blue Jays	2–1	18	0.88	60	
1986	John Mitchell	Tidewater Tides	New York Mets	12–9	0	3.39	83	
1987	Brad Arnsberg	Columbus Clippers	New York Yankees	12–5	0	2.88	83	
1988	Steve Searcy	Toledo Mud Hens	Detroit Tigers	13–7	0	2.59	176	
1989	Alex Sanchez	Syracuse Chiefs	Toronto Blue Jays	13–7	0	3.13	141	
1990	Dave Eiland	Columbus Clippers	New York Yankees	16–5	0	2.87	96	
1991	Mike Mussina	Rochester Red Wings	Baltimore Orioles	10–4	0	2.87	107	
1992	Sam Militello	Columbus Clippers	New York Yankees	12–2	0	2.29	152	
1993	Aaron Sele	Pawtucket Red Sox	Boston Red Sox	8–2	0	2.19	87	
1994	Brad Woodall	Richmond Braves	Atlanta Braves	15–6	0	2.42	137	
1995	Jason Isringhausen	Norfolk Tides	New York Mets	9–1	0	1.55	75	
1996	Mike Fyhrie	Norfolk Tides	New York Mets	15–6	0	3.04	103	
1997	Brian Rose	Pawtucket Red Sox	Boston Red Sox	17–5	0	3.02	116	
1998	Shannon Withem	Syracuse SkyChiefs	Toronto Blue Jays	17–5	0	3.27	113	
1999	Ed Yarnall	Columbus Clippers	New York Yankees	13–4	0	3.47	146	
2000	Jon Garland	Charlotte Knights	Chicago White Sox	9–2	0	2.26	63	
2001	Brandon Duckworth	Scranton/Wilkes-Barre Red Barons	Philadelphia Phillies	13–2	0	2.63	150	
2002	Joe Roa	Scranton/Wilkes-Barre Red Barons	Philadelphia Phillies	14–0	0	1.86	74	
2003	Bronson Arroyo	Pawtucket Red Sox	Boston Red Sox	12–6	0	3.43	155	
2004	Ben Hendrickson	Indianapolis Indians	Milwaukee Brewers	11–3	0	2.02	93	
2005	Zach Duke	Indianapolis Indians	Pittsburgh Pirates	12–3	0	2.92	66	
2006	Heath Phillips	Charlotte Knights	Chicago White Sox	13–5	0	2.96	102	
2007	Kevin Slowey	Rochester Red Wings	Minnesota Twins	10–5	0	1.89	107	
2008	Charlie Zink	Pawtucket Red Sox	Boston Red Sox	14–6	0	2.84	106	
2009	Justin Lehr (Note: Lehr was traded from Lehigh Valley (Philadelphia) to Louisville (Cincinnati) on May 23, 2009.)	Lehigh Valley IronPigs; Louisville Bats	Philadelphia Phillies; Cincinnati Reds	13–3	0	3.31	60	
2010	Jeremy Hellickson	Durham Bulls	Tampa Bay Rays	12–3	0	2.45	123	
2011	Julio Teherán	Gwinnett Braves	Atlanta Braves	15–3	0	2.55	122	
2012	Tyler Cloyd	Lehigh Valley IronPigs	Philadelphia Phillies	12–1	0	2.35	93	
2013	J. D. Martin	Durham Bulls	Tampa Bay Rays	16–4	0	2.75	116	
2014	Anthony Ranaudo	Pawtucket Red Sox	Boston Red Sox	14–4	0	2.61	111	
2015	Erik Johnson	Charlotte Knights	Chicago White Sox	11–8	0	2.37	136	
2016	Jake Thompson	Lehigh Valley IronPigs	Philadelphia Phillies	11–5	0	2.50	87	
2017	Steven Brault	Indianapolis Indians	Pittsburgh Pirates	10–5	0	1.94	109	
2018	Cole Irvin	Lehigh Valley IronPigs	Philadelphia Phillies	14–4	0	2.57	131	
2019	Mitch Keller	Indianapolis Indians	Pittsburgh Pirates	7–5	0	3.56	123	
2020	None selected (season cancelled due to COVID-19 pandemic)							
2021	Jackson Kowar	Omaha Storm Chasers	Kansas City Royals	9–4	0	3.46	115	
2022	Greg Weissert	Scranton/Wilkes-Barre RailRiders	New York Yankees	2–1	18	1.69	70	
2023	Robert Gasser	Nashville Sounds	Milwaukee Brewers	9–1	0	3.79	166	
2024	Chad Patrick	Nashville Sounds	Milwaukee Brewers	14–1	0	2.90	145	
2025	Mick Abel (Note: Abel was traded from Lehigh Valley (Philadelphia) to St. Paul (Minnesota) on July 30, 2025.)	Lehigh Valley IronPigs; St. Paul Saints	Philadelphia Phillies; Minnesota Twins	7–2	0	2.20	114	
2026	Brendan Beck	Scranton/Wilkes-Barre RailRiders	New York Yankees	10–2	0	2.93	151	

== Wins by team ==
Active International League teams appear in bold.

Team	Award(s)	Year(s)
Pawtucket Red Sox	7	1973, 1981, 1993, 1997, 2003, 2008, 2014
**Rochester Red Wings**	7	1954, 1967, 1971, 1976, 1977, 1991, 2007
**Columbus Clippers**	6	1979, 1980, 1987, 1990, 1992, 1999
**Norfolk Tides** (Tidewater Tides)	6	1975, 1978, 1983, 1896, 1995, 1996
**Syracuse Mets** (Syracuse Chiefs/SkyChiefs)	6	1969, 1970, 1974, 1985, 1989, 1998
**Indianapolis Indians**	5	1963, 2004, 2005, 2017, 2019
**Lehigh Valley IronPigs**	5	2009, 2012, 2016, 2018, 2025
Toronto Maple Leafs	5	1955, 1956, 1957, 1960, 1966
**Scranton/Wilkes-Barre Highlanders** (Scranton/Wilkes-Barre Red Barons/RailRiders)	4	2001, 2002, 2022, 2026
**Charlotte Knights**	3	2000, 2006, 2015
Columbus Jets	3	1961, 1965, 1968
**Durham Bulls**	2	2010, 2013
**Nashville Sounds**	2	2023, 2024
Richmond Braves	2	1982, 1994
Richmond Virginians	2	1969, 1964
**Toledo Mud Hens**	2	1984, 1988
Charleston Charlies	1	1972
**Gwinnett Stripers** (Gwinnett Braves)	1	2011
**Jacksonville Jumbo Shrimp** (Jacksonville Suns)	1	1962
**Louisville Bats**	1	2009
Montreal Royals	1	1958
**Omaha Storm Chasers**	1	2021
Ottawa Athletics	1	1953
**St. Paul Saints**	1	2025

== Wins by organization ==
Active International League–Major League Baseball affiliations appear in bold.

Organization	Award(s)	Year(s)
**New York Yankees**	13	1959, 1964, 1969, 1970, 1974, 1979, 1980, 1987, 1990, 1992, 1999, 2022, 2026
**Boston Red Sox**	8	1966, 1973, 1981, 1993, 1997, 2003, 2008, 2014
**Philadelphia Phillies**	7	2001, 2002, 2009, 2012, 2016, 2018, 2025
**Pittsburgh Pirates**	7	1961, 1965, 1968, 1972, 2005, 2017, 2019
**New York Mets**	6	1975, 1978, 1983, 1986, 1995, 1996
**Baltimore Orioles**	5	1967, 1971, 1976, 1977, 1991
**Chicago White Sox**	4	1963, 2000, 2006, 2015
**Atlanta Braves**	3	1982, 1994, 2011
**Milwaukee Brewers**	3	2004, 2023, 2024
**Minnesota Twins**	3	1984, 2007, 2025
**Toronto Blue Jays**	3	1985, 1989, 1998
**Cleveland Guardians** (Cleveland Indians)	2	1960, 1962
**Tampa Bay Rays**	2	2010, 2013
**Cincinnati Reds**	1	2009
**Detroit Tigers**	1	1988
**Kansas City Royals**	1	2021
Los Angeles Dodgers	1	1958
Oakland Athletics (Philadelphia Athletics)	1	1953
**St. Louis Cardinals**	1	1954
