= Luis Alvarado =

Puerto Rican baseball player (1949–2001)

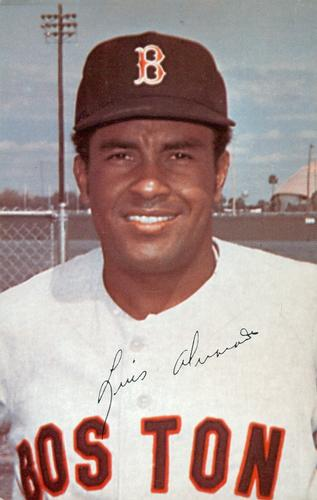
- Alvarado in 1970
- Infielder
- Born: January 15, 1949; Lajas, Puerto Rico
- Died: March 20, 2001 (aged 52); Lajas, Puerto Rico
- Batted: Right Threw: Right

MLB debut
- September 13, 1968, for the Boston Red Sox

Last MLB appearance
- April 30, 1977, for the Detroit Tigers

MLB statistics
- Batting average: .214
- Home runs: 5
- Runs batted in: 84
- Stats at Baseball Reference

Teams
- Boston Red Sox (1968–1970); Chicago White Sox (1971–1974); St. Louis Cardinals (1974); Cleveland Indians (1974); St. Louis Cardinals (1976); New York Mets (1977); Detroit Tigers (1977)

Luis César Alvarado Martínez (January 15, 1949 – March 20, 2001) was a Puerto Rican infielder in Major League Baseball (MLB). From 1968 through 1977, he played for the Boston Red Sox, Chicago White Sox, St. Louis Cardinals, Cleveland Indians, New York Mets and Detroit Tigers. Alvarado batted and threw right-handed.

== Biography ==
Nicknamed "Pimba", Alvarado broke into the majors in 1968 with the Boston Red Sox. In 1969 he started at Triple-A with the Louisville Colonels, and led the International League in runs (89) and hits (166), garnering Most Valuable Player honors. He returned to the Red Sox at the end of the season.

Alvarado divided much of his career playing time between shortstop and second base. After hitting .224 in 59 games for Boston in 1970, he was traded along with Mike Andrews to the Chicago White Sox for Luis Aparicio on December 1 of that year. His most productive season came in 1972, when he posted career-highs in runs (30), hits (57), doubles (14) and games (103). He played in parts of 1974 to 1977 divided between the Cardinals, Indians, Mets and Tigers and for several teams in the Mexican League from 1979 to 1981. In nine seasons, he posted a .214 batting average with five home runs and 84 runs batted in (RBIs) in 463 games played.

Alvarado died in his hometown of Lajas, Puerto Rico, at the age of 52 from a heart attack on March 20, 2001.

== See also ==
- List of Major League Baseball players from Puerto Rico
