= Ken Lehman =

American baseball player (1928–2010)

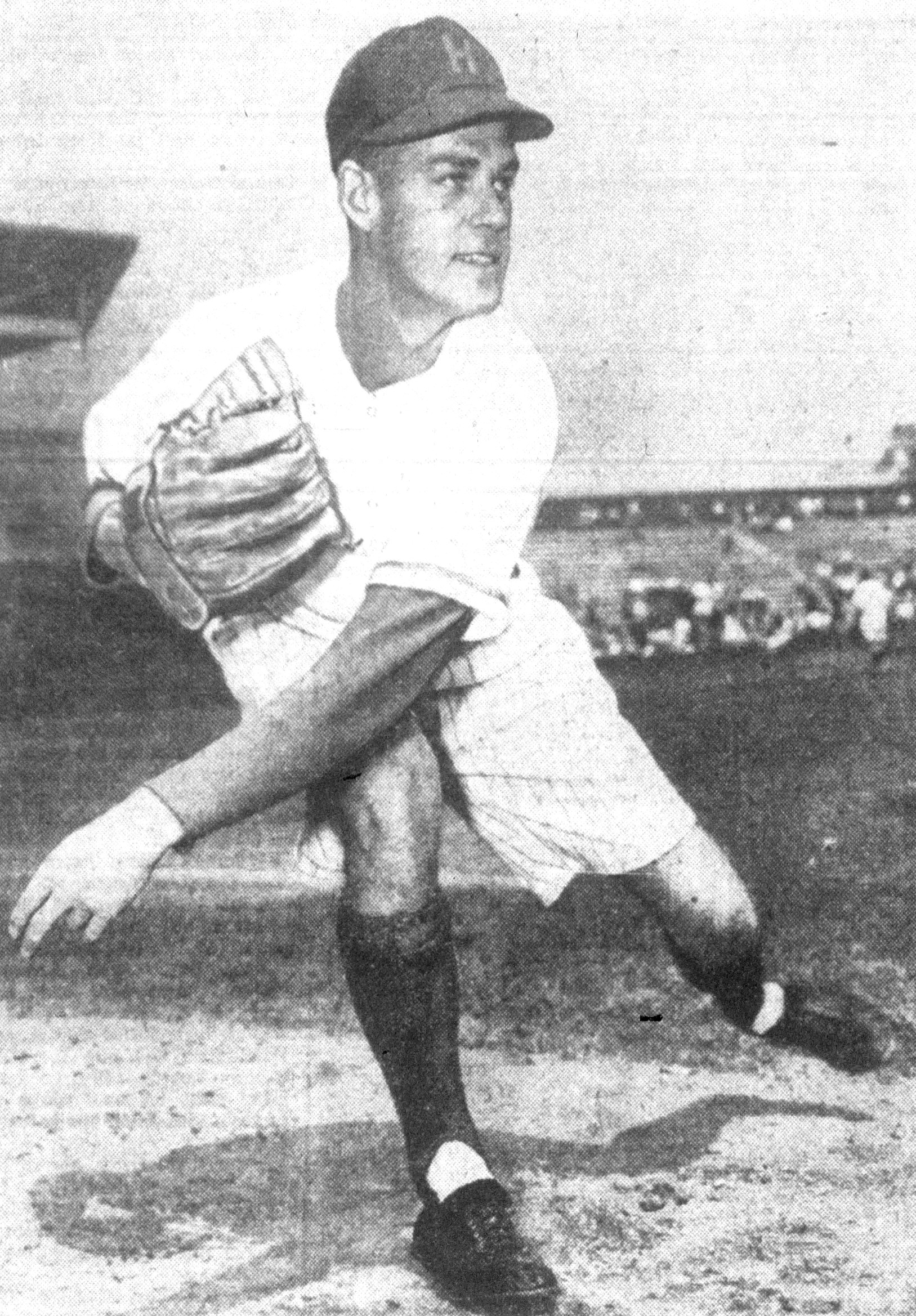
- Lehman, circa 1950
- Relief pitcher
- Born: June 10, 1928; Seattle, Washington, U.S.
- Died: December 4, 2010 (aged 82); Sedro-Woolley, Washington, U.S.
- Batted: Left Threw: Left

MLB debut
- September 5, 1952, for the Brooklyn Dodgers

Last MLB appearance
- September 30, 1961, for the Philadelphia Phillies

MLB statistics
- Win–loss record: 14–10
- Earned run average: 3.91
- Strikeouts: 134
- Stats at Baseball Reference

Teams
- Brooklyn Dodgers (1952, 1956–1957); Baltimore Orioles (1957–1958); Philadelphia Phillies (1961)

Kenneth Karl Lehman (June 10, 1928 – December 4, 2010) was an American relief pitcher in Major League Baseball who pitched for three different teams between the 1952 and 1961 seasons. Listed at 6 ft 0 in (1.83 m), 170 lb (77 kg), he batted and threw left-handed.

Born in Seattle, Washington, Lehman was signed by the Brooklyn Dodgers organization in 1946 out of Kirkland High School and entered on their farm system in 1947. He played four seasons, reaching the Hollywood Stars of the Pacific Coast League in 1950 before enlisting in the Army during Korean War.

Following military discharge, Lehman made his major league debut with the Dodgers in 1952 and later pitched two scoreless innings in Game 2 of the 1952 World Series against the New York Yankees.

After three successful years with the Montreal Royals of the International League, Lehman returned to the Dodgers for the entire 1956 season. He then was purchased by the Baltimore Orioles during the middle of the 1957 season and pitched for them through 1958.

Lehman collected career numbers in 1957 while pitching for Baltimore, when he posted an 8–3 record with a 2.78 earned run average and six saves in 68 innings of work, appearing primarily as a left-handed specialist and spot starter.

From 1959 to 1960 Lehman pitched for the Buffalo Bisons of the International League. He returned to the majors in 1961 season, appearing in 41 games with the Philadelphia Phillies.

After that, Lehman spent one more season in AAA with Buffalo and the Jacksonville Suns, retiring after 1962 with a 14–10 mark and a 3.91 ERA in five major league years. In eleven minor league seasons, he posted a 141–101 record with a 3.60 ERA in 340 games.

Following his playing retirement, Lehman coached at the University of Washington from 1964 to 1971, retiring with a record of 96–177. He later worked in the Mount Baker School District for 31 years.

Lehman died in Sedro-Woolley, Washington, at the age of 82.
