= International League Most Valuable Player Award =

- Sport: Baseball
- League: International League
- Awarded for: Regular-season most valuable player in the International League
- Country: United States; Canada
- Presented by: International League

History
- First award: Marv Owen (1932)
- Most wins: Rocky Nelson (3)
- Most recent: Cooper Ingle (2026)

The International League Most Valuable Player Award (MVP) is an annual award given to the best player in Minor League Baseball's International League based on their regular-season performance as voted on by league managers. Broadcasters, Minor League Baseball executives, members of the media, coaches, and other representatives from the league's clubs have previously voted as well. Though the circuit was founded in 1884, it did not become known as the International League on a consistent basis until 1912.

The first Most Valuable Player Award was not issued until 1932. After the cancellation of the 2020 season, the league was known as the Triple-A East in 2021 before reverting to the International League name in 2022.

Thirty-one outfielders have won the MVP Award, the most of any position. First basemen, with 28 winners, have won the most among infielders, followed by third basemen (14), shortstops (10), and second basemen (5). Five catchers and four pitchers have won the award.

Seventeen players who have won the MVP Award also won the International League Top MLB Prospect Award (formerly the Rookie of the Year Award) in the same season: Don Buford (1963), Joe Foy (1965), Mike Epstein (1966), Merv Rettenmund (1968), Luis Alvarado (1969), Roger Freed (1970), Jim Rice (1974), Mike Vail (1975), Rich Dauer (1976), Scott Bradley (1984), Dan Pasqua (1985), Randy Milligan (1987), J. T. Snow (1992), Chris Colabello (2013), Steven Souza Jr. (2014), Rhys Hoskins (2017), and Joey Meneses (2018). From 1932 to 1952, pitchers were eligible to win the MVP Award as no award was designated for pitchers. In 1953, the International League established a Pitcher of the Year Award (formerly the Most Valuable Pitcher Award). Two players have won the MVP Award on multiple occasions. Rocky Nelson, who was the MVP for 1953, 1955, and 1958, has the most wins. Roberto Petagine won back-to-back in 1997 and 1998.

Twelve players from the Rochester Red Wings have been selected for the MVP Award, more than any other team in the league, followed by the Columbus Clippers (10); the original Buffalo Bisons and Norfolk Tides (8); the Pawtucket Red Sox and Toronto Maple Leafs (7); the Durham Bulls and Syracuse Mets (6); the Baltimore Orioles, Montreal Royals, and Toledo Mud Hens (5); the Newark Bears and Scranton/Wilkes-Barre Highlanders (3); the Buffalo Bisons, Indianapolis Indians, Jacksonville Jumbo Shrimp, Lehigh Valley IronPigs, Louisville Colonels, and Richmond Braves (2); and the Charlotte Knights, Columbus Jets, Louisville Bats, and Memphis Redbirds (1).

Fourteen players from the New York Yankees Major League Baseball (MLB) organization have won the award, more than any other, followed by the Baltimore Orioles, Boston Red Sox, and Cleveland Guardians organizations (10); the New York Mets and Tampa Bay Rays organizations (6); the Cincinnati Reds, Detroit Tigers, Los Angeles Dodgers, Philadelphia Phillies, and St. Louis Cardinalsorganizations (5); the Toronto Blue Jays organization (3); the Atlanta Braves and Minnesota Twins organizations (2); and the Chicago White Sox, Oakland Athletics, Pittsburgh Pirates, and Washington Nationals organizations (1). Eight award winners played for teams that were not affiliated with any MLB organization.

== Winners ==
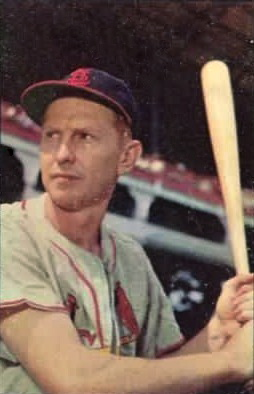
Red Schoendienst, the 1943 MVP, was inducted into the Baseball Hall of Fame in 1989.

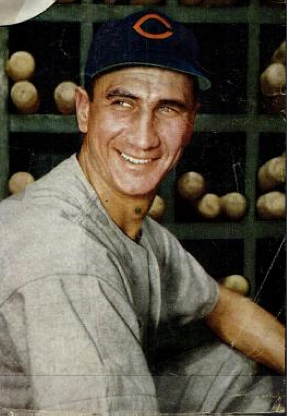
Hank Sauer, the 1947 winner, was selected as the 1952 National League Most Valuable Player.

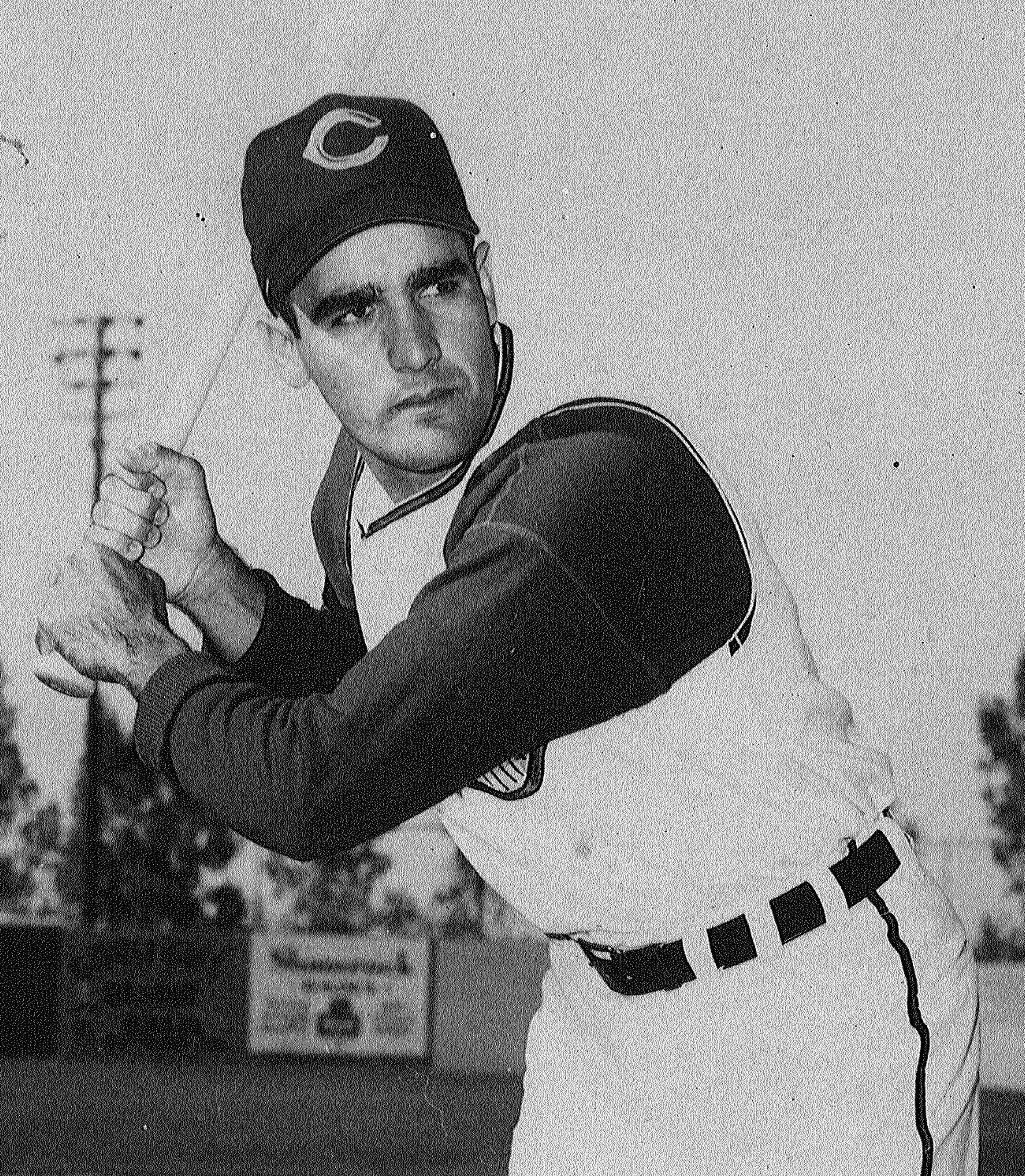
Tony Martínez won the 1962 International League MVP Award.

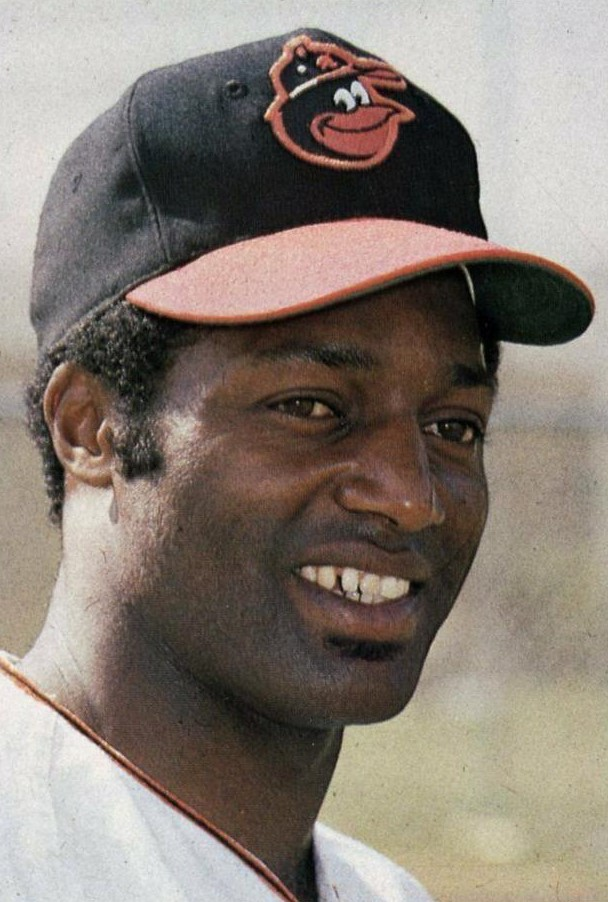
Don Buford was the first to win the MVP Award and Rookie of the Year in the same season (1963).

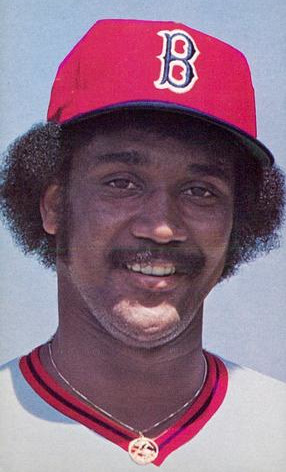
Jim Rice, the 1974 winner, won 1978 American League MVP Award and was inducted into the Baseball Hall of Fame in 2009.

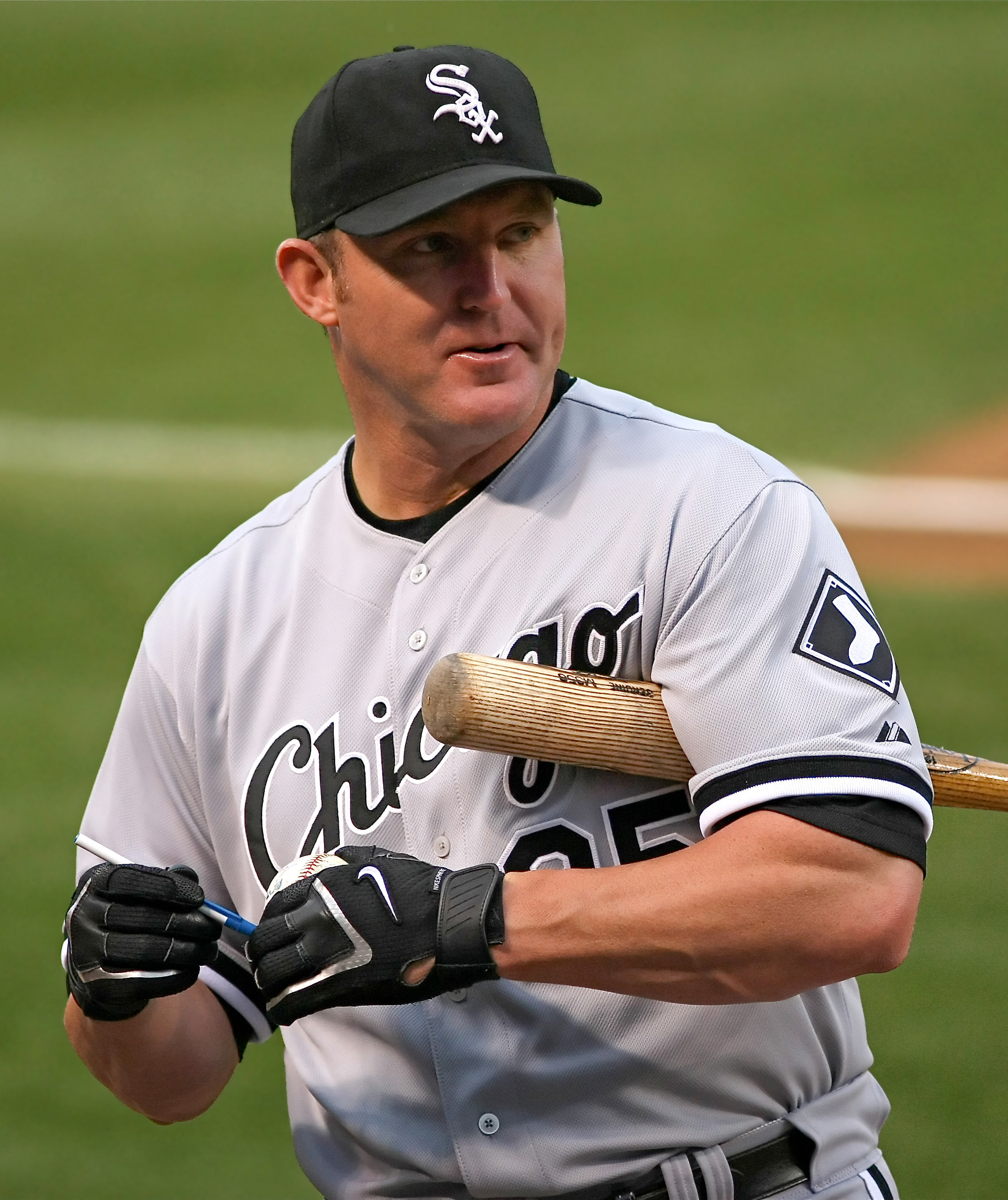
Jim Thome, the 1993 MVP, was inducted into the Baseball Hall of Fame in 2018.

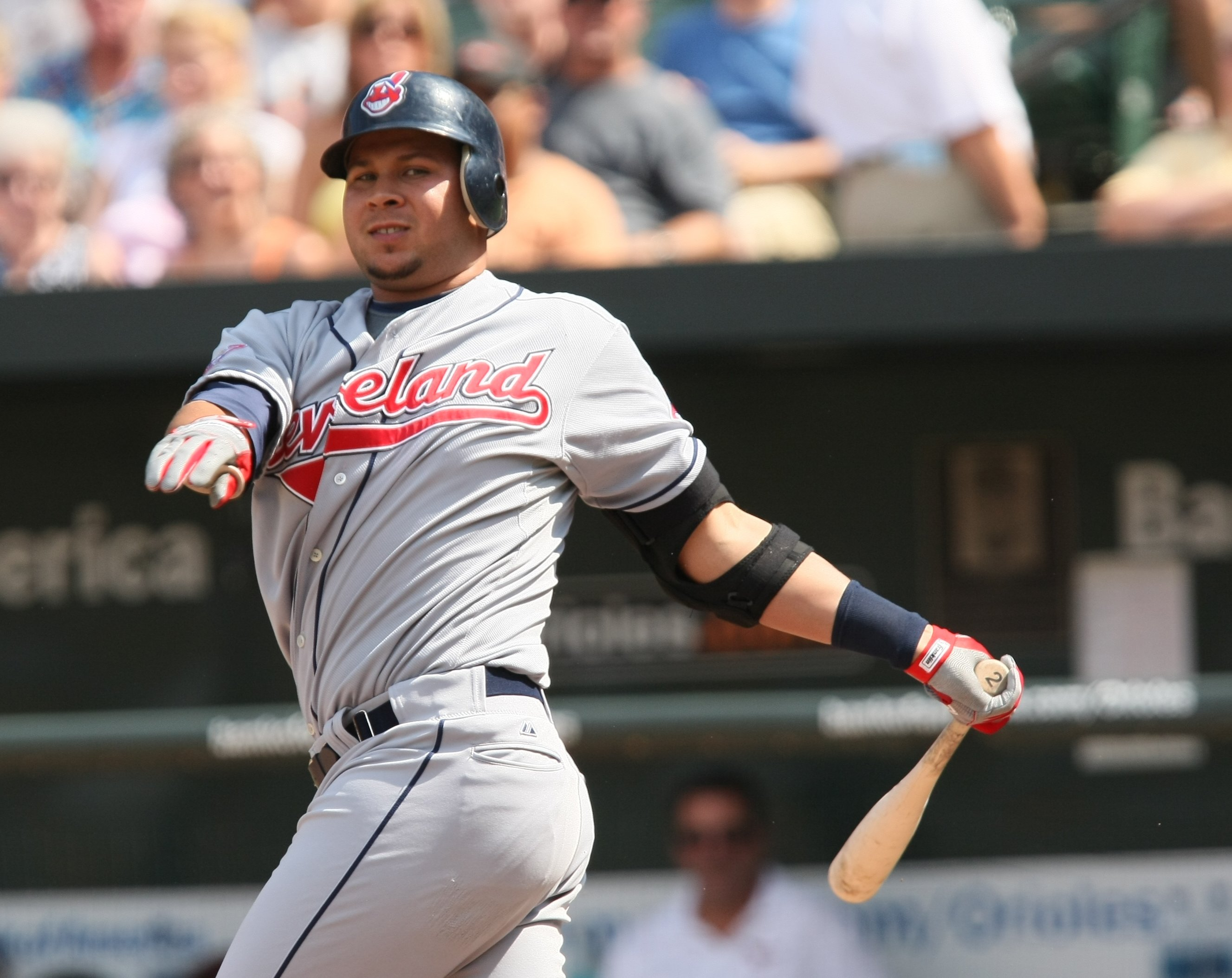
Jhonny Peralta won the 2004 International League MVP Award.

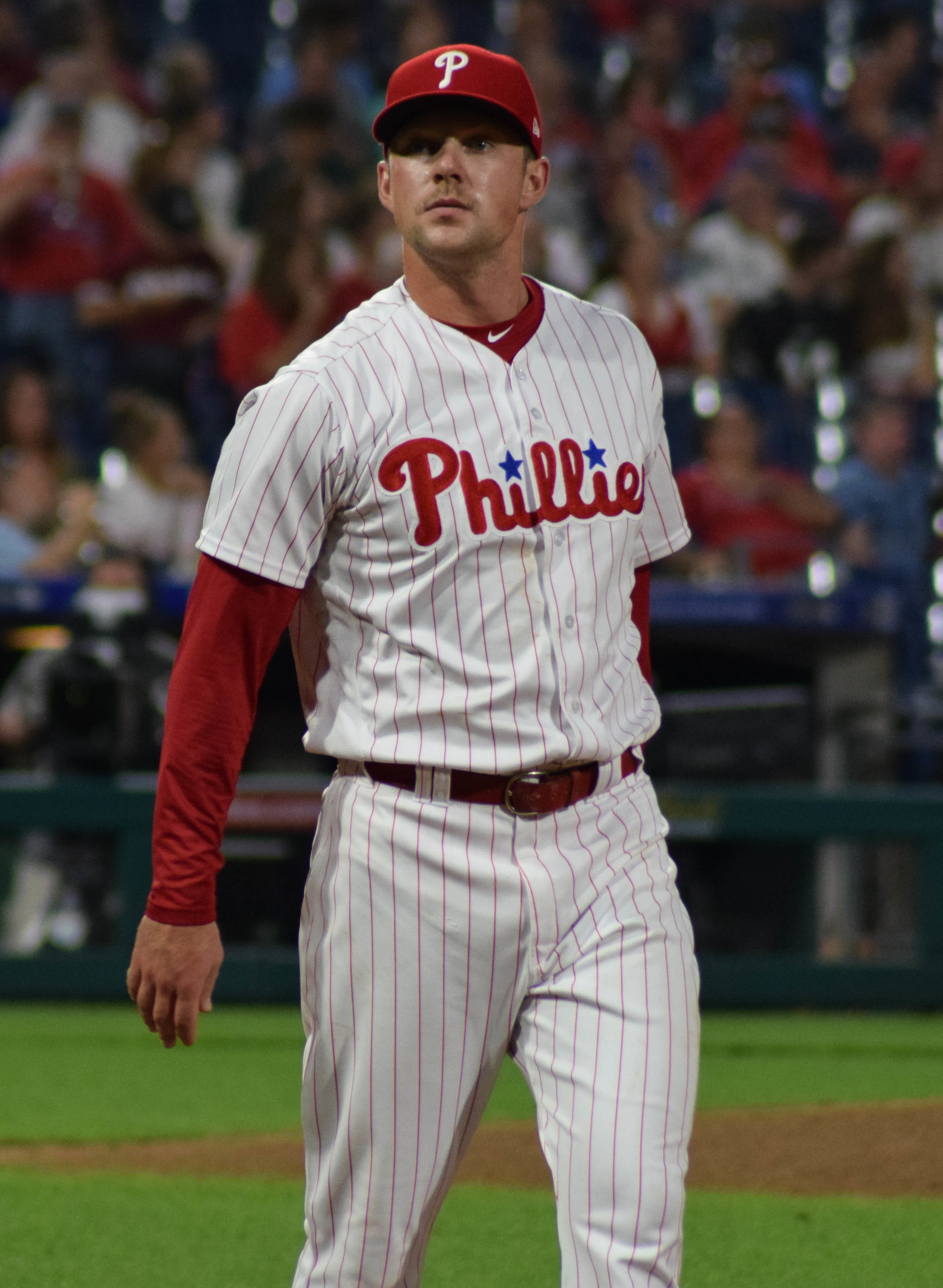
Rhys Hoskins was the 2017 International League MVP.

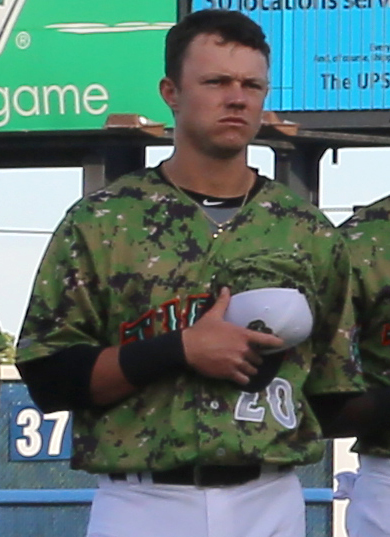
Ryan Mountcastle won the 2019 International League MVP Award.

Key
Position	Indicates the player's primary position
(#)	Number of wins by players who won the award multiple times
^	Indicates multiple award winners in the same year

Winners
Year	Winner	Team	Organization	Position	Ref(s).
1932	Marv Owen (Note: Owen was traded from Toronto (Detroit) to Newark (New York) on June 3, 1932.)	Toronto Maple Leafs; Newark Bears	Detroit Tigers; New York Yankees	Third baseman	
1933	Red Rolfe	Newark Bears	New York Yankees	Shortstop	
1934	Ike Boone	Toronto Maple Leafs	Cincinnati Reds	Outfielder	
1935	George Puccinelli	Baltimore Orioles	—	Outfielder	
1936	Beauty McGowan	Buffalo Bisons	—	Outfielder	
1937	Buck Crouse (Note: Crouse began the 1937 season with Buffalo as a catcher, but was acquired by Baltimore to be their player-manager on May 19.)	Buffalo Bisons; Baltimore Orioles	— —	Catcher	
1938	Ollie Carnegie	Buffalo Bisons	—	Outfielder	
1939	Mickey Witek	Newark Bears	New York Yankees	Shortstop	
1940	Mike Ryba	Rochester Red Wings	St. Louis Cardinals	Pitcher	
1941	Fred Hutchinson	Buffalo Bisons	Detroit Tigers	Pitcher	
1942	Red Barrett	Syracuse Chiefs	Cincinnati Reds	Pitcher	
1943	Red Schoendienst	Rochester Red Wings	St. Louis Cardinals	Shortstop	
1944	Howie Moss	Baltimore Orioles	Cleveland Indians	Outfielder	
1945	Sherm Lollar	Baltimore Orioles	Cleveland Indians	Catcher	
1946	Eddie Robinson	Baltimore Orioles	Cleveland Indians	First baseman	
1947	Hank Sauer	Syracuse Chiefs	Cincinnati Reds	Outfielder	
1948	Jimmy Bloodworth	Montreal Royals	Brooklyn Dodgers	Second baseman	
1949	Bobby Morgan	Montreal Royals	Brooklyn Dodgers	Shortstop	
1950	Tom Poholsky	Rochester Red Wings	St. Louis Cardinals	Pitcher	
1951	Archie Wilson	Buffalo Bisons	—	Outfielder	
1952	Jim Gilliam	Montreal Royals	Brooklyn Dodgers	Second baseman	
1953	Rocky Nelson (1)	Montreal Royals	Brooklyn Dodgers	First baseman	
1954	Elston Howard	Toronto Maple Leafs	—	Catcher	
1955	Rocky Nelson (2)	Montreal Royals	Brooklyn Dodgers	First baseman	
1956	Mike Goliat	Toronto Maple Leafs	—	Second baseman	
1957	Mike Baxes	Buffalo Bisons	Kansas City Athletics	Shortstop	
1958	Rocky Nelson (3)	Toronto Maple Leafs	—	First baseman	
1959	Pancho Herrera	Buffalo Bisons	Philadelphia Phillies	First baseman	
1960	Jim King	Toronto Maple Leafs	Cleveland Indians	Outfielder	
1961	Ted Savage	Buffalo Bisons	Philadelphia Phillies	Outfielder	
1962	Tony Martínez	Jacksonville Suns	Cleveland Indians	Shortstop	
1963	Don Buford	Indianapolis Indians	Chicago White Sox	Third baseman	
1964	Joe Morgan	Jacksonville Suns	St. Louis Cardinals	Third baseman	
1965	Joe Foy	Toronto Maple Leafs	Boston Red Sox	Third baseman	
1966	Mike Epstein	Rochester Red Wings	Baltimore Orioles	First baseman	
1967	Tommie Aaron	Richmond Braves	Atlanta Braves	Outfielder	
1968	Merv Rettenmund	Rochester Red Wings	Baltimore Orioles	Outfielder	
1969	Luis Alvarado	Louisville Colonels	Boston Red Sox	Shortstop	
1970^	Roger Freed	Rochester Red Wings	Baltimore Orioles	Outfielder	
1970^	George Kopacz	Columbus Jets	Pittsburgh Pirates	First baseman	
1971	Bobby Grich	Rochester Red Wings	Baltimore Orioles	Shortstop	
1972	Dwight Evans	Louisville Colonels	Boston Red Sox	Outfielder	
1973	Jim Fuller	Rochester Red Wings	Baltimore Orioles	Outfielder	
1974	Jim Rice	Pawtucket Red Sox	Boston Red Sox	Outfielder	
1975	Mike Vail	Tidewater Tides	New York Mets	Outfielder	
1976^	Rich Dauer	Rochester Red Wings	Baltimore Orioles	Second baseman	
1976^	Mickey Klutts	Syracuse Chiefs	New York Yankees	Shortstop	
1976^	Joe Lis	Toledo Mud Hens	Cleveland Indians	First baseman	
1977	Ted Cox	Pawtucket Red Sox	Boston Red Sox	Third baseman	
1978	Gary Allenson	Pawtucket Red Sox	Boston Red Sox	Catcher	
1979^	Bobby Brown	Columbus Clippers	New York Yankees	Outfielder	
1979^	Dave Stapleton	Pawtucket Red Sox	Boston Red Sox	First baseman	
1980	Marshall Brant	Columbus Clippers	New York Yankees	First baseman	
1981	Brett Butler	Richmond Braves	Atlanta Braves	Outfielder	
1982	Tucker Ashford	Columbus Clippers	New York Yankees	Third baseman	
1983	Tim Teufel	Toledo Mud Hens	Minnesota Twins	Second baseman	
1984	Scott Bradley	Columbus Clippers	New York Yankees	Catcher	
1985	Dan Pasqua	Columbus Clippers	New York Yankees	Outfielder	
1986	Pat Dodson	Pawtucket Red Sox	Boston Red Sox	First baseman	
1987	Randy Milligan	Tidewater Tides	New York Mets	First baseman	
1988	Craig Worthington	Rochester Red Wings	Baltimore Orioles	Third baseman	
1989	Tom O'Malley	Tidewater Tides	New York Mets	Third baseman	
1990	Hensley Meulens	Columbus Clippers	New York Yankees	Outfielder	
1991	Derek Bell	Syracuse Chiefs	Toronto Blue Jays	Outfielder	
1992	J. T. Snow	Columbus Clippers	New York Yankees	First baseman	
1993	Jim Thome	Charlotte Knights	Cleveland Indians	Third baseman	
1994	Jeff Manto (Note: Manto was traded from Norfolk (New York) to Rochester (Baltimore) on May 19, 1994.)	Norfolk Tides; Rochester Red Wings	New York Mets; Baltimore Orioles	Third baseman	
1995	Butch Huskey	Norfolk Tides	New York Mets	Third baseman	
1996	Phil Hiatt	Toledo Mud Hens	Detroit Tigers	Third baseman	
1997	Roberto Petagine (1)	Norfolk Tides	New York Mets	First baseman	
1998	Roberto Petagine (2)	Indianapolis Indians	Cincinnati Reds	First baseman	
1999	Steve Cox	Durham Bulls	Tampa Bay Devil Rays	First baseman	
2000	Chad Mottola	Syracuse SkyChiefs	Toronto Blue Jays	Outfielder	
2001	Toby Hall	Durham Bulls	Tampa Bay Devil Rays	Catcher	
2002	Raúl González	Louisville Bats	Cincinnati Reds	Outfielder	
2003	Fernando Seguignol	Columbus Clippers	New York Yankees	First baseman	
2004	Jhonny Peralta	Buffalo Bisons	Cleveland Indians	Shortstop	
2005	Shane Victorino	Scranton/Wilkes-Barre Red Barons	Philadelphia Phillies	Outfielder	
2006	Kevin Witt	Durham Bulls	Tampa Bay Devil Rays	First baseman	
2007	Mike Hessman	Toledo Mud Hens	Detroit Tigers	Third baseman	
2008	Jeff Bailey	Pawtucket Red Sox	Boston Red Sox	First baseman	
2009	Shelley Duncan	Scranton/Wilkes-Barre Yankees	New York Yankees	Outfielder	
2010	Dan Johnson	Durham Bulls	Tampa Bay Rays	Third baseman	
2011	Russ Canzler	Durham Bulls	Tampa Bay Rays	Outfielder	
2012	Mauro Gómez	Pawtucket Red Sox	Boston Red Sox	First baseman	
2013	Chris Colabello	Rochester Red Wings	Minnesota Twins	First baseman	
2014	Steven Souza Jr.	Syracuse Chiefs	Washington Nationals	Outfielder	
2015	Matt Hague	Buffalo Bisons	Toronto Blue Jays	First baseman	
2016	Ben Gamel	Scranton/Wilkes-Barre RailRiders	New York Yankees	Outfielder	
2017	Rhys Hoskins	Lehigh Valley IronPigs	Philadelphia Phillies	First baseman	
2018	Joey Meneses	Lehigh Valley IronPigs	Philadelphia Phillies	First baseman	
2019	Ryan Mountcastle	Norfolk Tides	Baltimore Orioles	First baseman	
2020	None selected (season cancelled due to COVID-19 pandemic)				
2021	Aderlin Rodríguez	Toledo Mud Hens	Detroit Tigers	First baseman	
2022	Jonathan Aranda	Durham Bulls	Tampa Bay Rays	First baseman	
2023	Luken Baker	Memphis Redbirds	St. Louis Cardinals	First baseman	
2024	Johnathan Rodríguez	Columbus Clippers	Cleveland Guardians	Outfielder	
2025	Dylan Beavers	Norfolk Tides	Baltimore Orioles	Outfielder	
2026	Cooper Ingle	Columbus Clippers	Cleveland Guardians	Outfielder	

== Wins by team ==
Active International League teams appear in bold.

Team	Award(s)	Year(s)
**Rochester Red Wings**	12	1940, 1943, 1950, 1966, 1968, 1970, 1971, 1973, 1976, 1988, 1994, 2013
**Columbus Clippers**	10	1979, 1980, 1982, 1984, 1985, 1990, 1992, 2003, 2024, 2026
Buffalo Bisons (1886–1970)	8	1936, 1937, 1938, 1941, 1951, 1957, 1959, 1961
**Norfolk Tides** (Tidewater Tides)	8	1975, 1987, 1989, 1994, 1995, 1997, 2019, 2025
Pawtucket Red Sox	7	1974, 1977, 1978, 1979, 1986, 2008, 2012
Toronto Maple Leafs	7	1932, 1934, 1954, 1956, 1958, 1960, 1965
**Durham Bulls**	6	1999, 2001, 2006, 2010, 2011, 2022
**Syracuse Mets** (Syracuse Chiefs/Sky Chiefs)	6	1942, 1947, 1976, 1991, 2000, 2014
Baltimore Orioles	5	1935, 1937, 1944, 1945, 1946
Montreal Royals	5	1948, 1949, 1952, 1953, 1955
**Toledo Mud Hens**	5	1976, 1983, 1996, 2007, 2021
Newark Bears	3	1932, 1933, 1939
**Scranton/Wilkes-Barre Highlanders** (Scranton/Wilkes-Barre Red Barons/Yankees/RailRiders)	3	2005, 2009, 2016
**Buffalo Bisons**	2	2004, 2015
**Indianapolis Indians**	2	1963, 1998
**Jacksonville Jumbo Shrimp** (Jacksonville Suns)	2	1962, 1964
**Lehigh Valley IronPigs**	2	2017, 2018
Louisville Colonels	2	1969, 1972
Richmond Braves	2	1967, 1981
**Charlotte Knights**	1	1993
Columbus Jets	1	1970
**Louisville Bats**	1	2002
**Memphis Redbirds**	1	2023

== Wins by organization ==
Active International League–Major League Baseball affiliations appear in bold.

Organization	Award(s)	Year(s)
**New York Yankees**	14	1932, 1933, 1939, 1976, 1979, 1980, 1982, 1984, 1985, 1990, 1992, 2003, 2009, 2016
**Baltimore Orioles**	10	1966, 1968, 1970, 1971, 1973, 1976, 1988, 1994, 2019, 2025
**Boston Red Sox**	10	1965, 1969, 1972, 1974, 1977, 1978, 1979, 1986, 2008, 2012
**Cleveland Guardians** (Cleveland Indians)	10	1944, 1945, 1946, 1960, 1962, 1976, 1993, 2004, 2024, 2026
**New York Mets**	6	1975, 1987, 1989, 1994, 1995, 1997
**Tampa Bay Rays** (Tampa Bay Devil Rays)	6	1999, 2001, 2006, 2010, 2011, 2022
**Cincinnati Reds**	5	1934, 1942, 1947, 1998, 2002
**Detroit Tigers**	5	1932, 1941, 1996, 2007, 2021
Los Angeles Dodgers (Brooklyn Dodgers)	5	1948, 1949, 1952, 1953, 1955
**Philadelphia Phillies**	5	1959, 1961, 2005, 2017, 2018
**St. Louis Cardinals**	5	1940, 1943, 1950, 1964, 2023
**Toronto Blue Jays**	3	1991, 2000, 2015
**Atlanta Braves**	2	1967, 1981
**Minnesota Twins**	2	1983, 2013
**Chicago White Sox**	1	1963
Oakland Athletics (Kansas City Athletics)	1	1957
**Pittsburgh Pirates**	1	1970
**Washington Nationals**	1	2014

== See also ==
- Major League Baseball Most Valuable Player Award
- Pacific Coast League Most Valuable Player Award
