= Rocky Nelson =

American baseball player (1924–2006)

- First baseman
- Born: November 18, 1924; Portsmouth, Ohio, U.S.
- Died: October 31, 2006 (aged 81); Portsmouth, Ohio, U.S.
- Batted: Left Threw: Left

MLB debut
- April 27, 1949, for the St. Louis Cardinals

Last MLB appearance
- September 29, 1961, for the Pittsburgh Pirates

MLB statistics
- Batting average: .249
- Home runs: 31
- Runs batted in: 173
- Stats at Baseball Reference

Teams
- St. Louis Cardinals (1949–1951); Pittsburgh Pirates (1951); Chicago White Sox (1951); Brooklyn Dodgers (1952); Cleveland Indians (1954); Brooklyn Dodgers (1956); St. Louis Cardinals (1956); Pittsburgh Pirates (1959–1961)

Career highlights and awards
- World Series champion (1960)

Member of the Canadian

Baseball Hall of Fame
- Induction: 1987

Glenn Richard "Rocky" Nelson (November 18, 1924 – October 31, 2006) was an American professional baseball first baseman who played in Major League Baseball for all or parts of nine seasons between 1949 and 1961 for the St. Louis Cardinals, Pittsburgh Pirates, Chicago White Sox, Brooklyn Dodgers and Cleveland Indians. A native of Portsmouth, Ohio, Nelson batted and threw left-handed, stood 5 feet 10 inches (1.78 m) tall and weighed 175 pounds (79 kg). He signed his first professional contract in 1942 with the Cardinals' organization. He then missed three seasons (1943–1945) while serving in the United States Army during World War II.

Prior to 1959, when he rejoined the Pirates, Nelson was a journeyman major leaguer, although he was one of the most feared hitters in minor league baseball. Apart from his 1949 rookie year, he had not spent more than half a season on a major league roster, playing for five different teams. Pittsburgh was one of three teams (the Dodgers and Cardinals were the others) who gave Nelson multiple opportunities during the 1950s. Reggie Otero, manager of the Triple-A Havana Sugar Kings from 1954–1956 and later a longtime coach for the Cincinnati Reds, saw Nelson clobber major league pitchers while playing winter baseball in Cuba. It was Otero's view that, for Nelson to gain a toehold in the major leagues, he needed a manager that would show patience toward him.

== Prodigious minor-league slugger ==
Nelson was regarded as one of the best sluggers to ever play in the International League. As a rookie in 1948, he helped the Rochester Red Wings qualify for the Governors' Cup playoffs. From 1953 to 1955, while playing for the Montreal Royals, Nelson led the International League once in batting average (1955), twice in home runs (1954, 1955), and twice in runs batted in (1953 and 1955). He would win his first minor-league Triple Crown in 1955 and was the league's MVP Award winner in 1953 and 1955. His performances were a topic of conversation among many managers of the time. They were baffled as to how to pitch to him, and even more mystified that he was still playing in the minor leagues.

Before Nelson finally caught on in the majors, he had to endure two more failed tryouts with the Dodgers and the Cardinals, both in 1956, plus one more stint in Triple-A. In 1957, he was acquired by the International League's Toronto Maple Leafs, whose owner, Jack Kent Cooke, boasted that "…whatever is worth buying in the pitching or power line will find its way to Toronto." In 1958, Nelson was voted the league's most valuable player for a third time after winning his second Triple Crown, leading the league in batting average (.326), home runs (43) and RBIs (120) while playing for the Maple Leafs. He was inducted into the International League Hall of Fame in 1960—while he was still an active player—and the Canadian Baseball Hall of Fame in 1987.

== Success with Pirates ==
In 1959 at age 34, Nelson became a full-year major leaguer with the Pittsburgh Pirates, who had reacquired him in the 1958 Rule 5 Draft. From 1959 to 1961, Nelson was a platoon first baseman, playing with and behind right-handed slugger Dick Stuart. In 1959 and 1960, he posted batting averages of .291 and .300 and hit 13 total home runs, but never duplicated his Triple-A slugging success. Despite these shortcomings, Nelson had some memorable moments with the Pirates. He was the first baseman in May 1959 when Harvey Haddix lost his perfect game bid in the 13th inning. He also appeared in four games of the 1960 World Series, batting .333 (with three hits and a base on balls in ten plate appearances), and belting a two-run home run off pitcher Bob Turley in the first inning of Game 7. Although his blow was not as dramatic as teammate Bill Mazeroski's home run in the same game to win the series, Nelson earned a world championship ring.

As a major leaguer, he helped the Dodgers win the 1952 National League pennant. He appeared in 37 games for Brooklyn from June 24 through season's end, mostly as a pinch hitter (taking the field for only five games and 29 total innings at first base), and collected ten hits in 39 at bats. Then, in the 1952 World Series, he pinch hit in four games; in four plate appearances, he was hitless in three at bats and drew a base on balls.

During all or parts of nine major league seasons, Nelson played in 620 games and had 1,394 at bats, 186 runs scored, 347 hits, 61 doubles, 14 triples, 31 homers, 173 RBI, seven stolen bases, 130 base on balls|walks, and a .249 career batting average, .317 on-base percentage, .379 slugging percentage, 529 total bases, 11 sacrifice hits, eight sacrifice flies and 13 intentional walks. He batted .250 with three hits, one home run, two bases on balls, and two runs batted in eight World Series games.

As a minor leaguer, Nelson amassed 1,604 hits, 308 doubles, 81 triples, 234 home runs, 1,009 runs batted in, and batted .319, with 87 stolen bases. He retired after spending the 1962 campaign in the minor leagues, having played for 18 seasons over 21 years.

His baseball card was featured in the 1993 movie Deception, starring Andie MacDowell and Viggo Mortensen.

Nelson died at age 81 in 2006 in his native city of Portsmouth.

== Triple Crown seasons ==
Nelson twice won the International League "Triple Crown", so called because it is earned by a player who leads his league in home runs, runs batted in, and batting average.

| Year | Team | Statistics |
|---|---|---|
| 1955 | Montreal Royals | 37 HR, 130 RBI, .364 Batting Average |
| 1958 | Toronto Maple Leafs | 43 HR, 120 RBI, .326 Batting Average |
