= Bob Trice =

American baseball player (1926-1988)

- Pitcher
- Born: August 28, 1926; Newton, Georgia, U.S.
- Died: September 16, 1988 (aged 62); Weirton, West Virginia, U.S.
- Batted: Right Threw: Right

Professional debut
- NgL: 1948, for the Homestead Grays
- MLB: September 13, 1953, for the Philadelphia Athletics

Last MLB appearance
- May 2, 1955, for the Kansas City Athletics

MLB statistics
- Win–loss record: 9–9
- Earned run average: 5.80
- Strikeouts: 28
- Stats at Baseball Reference

Teams
- Negro leagues: Homestead Grays (1948–1950); Major League Baseball: Philadelphia / Kansas City Athletics (1953–1955)
Military career
Allegiance	United States
Branch	United States Navy
Service years	1944–1946

Robert Lee Trice (August 28, 1926 – September 16, 1988) was an American professional baseball pitcher who played for the Philadelphia / Kansas City Athletics (1953–1955). A native of Newton, Georgia, the right-hander stood 6 ft 3 in (1.91 m) and weighed 190 lbs.

== Career ==
Trice's professional career began with the Negro league Homestead Grays, where he played from 1948 to 1950. He was brought to Philadelphia in 1953 after winning 21 games for the Ottawa A's of the International League. When Trice made his major league debut (September 13, 1953 at Connie Mack Stadium), he became the first black player in Athletics history. He appeared in three games for the A's that season, winning 2 and losing 1. He lost his first start, 5-2, to Don Larsen and the St. Louis Browns, but then defeated the Washington Senators in each of his other two starts.

His finest major league effort came on April 24, 1954 against the New York Yankees. He pitched a 1–0 complete game shutout that day in front of a home crowd of 4,920.

Career totals for 27 games played (26 as a pitcher) include a 9–9 record, 21 games started, 9 complete games, 1 shutout, and 3 games finished. He allowed 98 earned runs in 152 innings pitched, giving him a lifetime ERA of 5.80. He had a strong bat for a pitcher...at the plate he was 15-for-52 (.288) with 1 home run, 6 runs batted in, 8 runs scored, and a slugging percentage of .423.

Trice died at the age of 62 in Weirton, West Virginia.

== See also ==
- List of first black Major League Baseball players
- List of Negro league baseball players who played in Major League Baseball
