= Springfield Cubs =

Professional baseball franchise

- 1948–1953; Springfield, Massachusetts

Minor league affiliations
- Class: AAA (1950–1953); B (1948–1949)
- League: International League (1950–1953); New England League (1948–1949)

Major league affiliations
- Team: Chicago Cubs (1948–1953)

Team data
- Ballpark: Pynchon Park

The Springfield Cubs, based in Springfield, Massachusetts, were a minor league baseball franchise that served as a farm team of the Chicago Cubs of Major League Baseball from 1948 to 1953. The team was a member of the Class B New England League in 1948 and 1949, and the Triple-A International League from 1950 to 1953. The team played its home games at Pynchon Park.

== History ==
Although the Springfield franchise of the New England League (NEL) had mediocre won-loss records in 1948 and 1949, the team finished second in attendance in 1948 and led the NEL in its final season of operation (1949), drawing over 102,000 fans. The 1949 team advanced to the league championship series, falling in seven games to the Portland Pilots.

After the NEL folded in the autumn of 1949, Springfield received a franchise in the International League (IL) when the Newark Bears transferred there for 1950. However, the Bears' parent team, the New York Yankees, did not follow, and Springfield retained its affiliation with the Chicago Cubs. It became Chicago's second Triple-A team, along with the Los Angeles Angels, the Cubs' longtime franchise in the Pacific Coast League. Springfield's first Triple-A manager was Stan Hack.

The Triple-A Springfield franchise drew over 200,000 fans in its maiden season, and just missed the playoffs, finishing fifth in the eight-team IL. Future major league third baseman Randy Jackson won IL rookie of the year honors. However, the success of that first season could not be duplicated, on or off the field. The Cubs did not have enough depth to field two strong Triple-A clubs, and the 1951 to 1953 Springfield Cubs placed last in the IL each season, and last or next to last in attendance. The franchise folded and was replaced by the Havana Sugar Kings in the 1954 IL lineup.

== Records by season ==
Year	League	Class	Record	Finish	Manager	Postseason (games)	Attendance	Ref.
1948	New England League	B	52–74 (.413)	6th of 8	Robert Peterson	did not qualify	95,406	
1949	New England League	B	57–64 (.471)	4th of 8	Robert Peterson	defeated Pawtucket Slaters (2–0) lost to Portland Pilots (3–4)	102,387	
1950	International League	AAA	74–78 (.487)	5th of 8	Stan Hack	did not qualify	201,217	
1951	International League	AAA	63–90 (.412)	8th of 8	Bill Kelly	did not qualify	105,052	
1952	International League	AAA	65–88 (.425)	8th of 8	Bill Kelly	did not qualify	107,675	
1953	International League	AAA	51–102 (.333)	8th of 8	Bruce Edwards / Jack Sheehan	did not qualify	85,281	

== See also ==
- Springfield Cubs players
- Springfield Ponies
