= Ottawa Athletics =

- 1952–1954; Ottawa, Ontario

Minor league affiliations
- Previous classes: Triple-A
- League: International League

Major league affiliations
- Previous teams: Philadelphia Athletics (1952–1954)

Team data
- Previous parks: Lansdowne Park

The Ottawa Athletics (also known as the Ottawa A's) were a professional minor-league baseball team based in Ottawa, Ontario, Canada, that operated from 1952 to 1954. The team played at Lansdowne Park in Ottawa and was a member of the Triple-A International League.

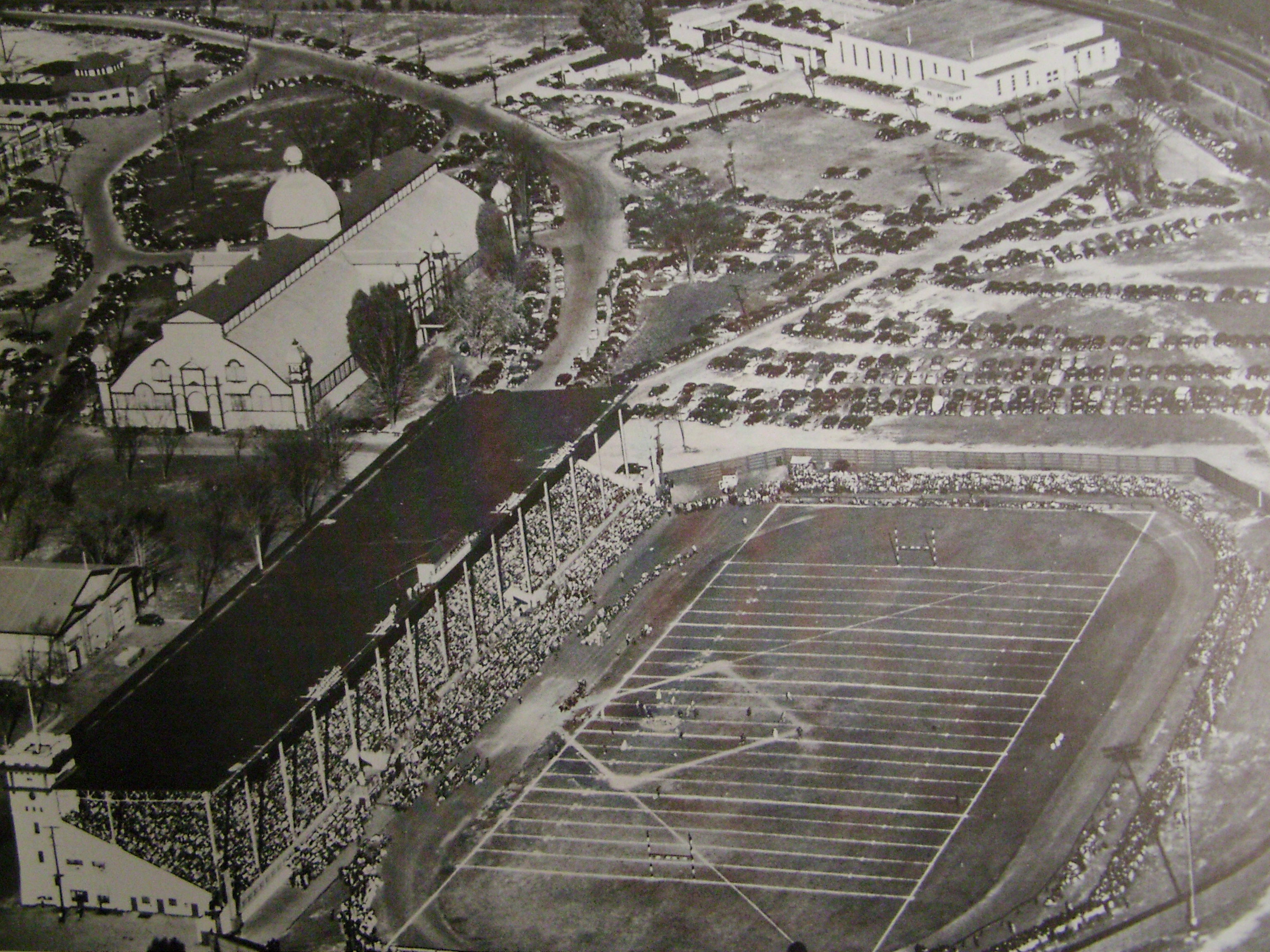
Lansdowne Park, 1950s

== History ==
Triple-A baseball and the International League first came to Ottawa in 1951, when the former Jersey City Giants (1937–50) relocated to Canada's capital because of poor attendance. Ottawa had most recently hosted the Nationals and the Senators of the Class C Border League from 1947 to 1950, leading that league in attendance for three of its four seasons and making the playoffs each year.

In 1951, the New York Giants of the National League operated two Triple-A affiliates, the Ottawa Giants and the Minneapolis Millers of the American Association. But after the 1951 campaign, the parent Giants decided to field only one top-level minor-league team in 1952—the Millers—and they abandoned Ottawa. The Philadelphia Athletics of the American League, who had no Triple-A affiliate in 1951, replaced the Giants and the Ottawa team was renamed.

The 1952 season saw Ottawa's attendance (over 153,000 fans) increase by 31 percent over the 1951 Giants', but the A's finished in seventh place in the eight-team IL. Attendance held steady in 1953 for a sixth-place team, but when the 1954 Ottawa A's plunged into the league's basement, attendance also plummeted to a league-worst 94,000 fans. The Athletics' record over their three years in Ottawa was a poor 194–264 (.424).

The Ottawa A's then relocated in 1955 to Columbus, Ohio, which had just lost its longtime American Association franchise to Omaha. The Ottawa Athletics were renamed the Columbus Jets, and the Jets and the International League remained in Ohio's capital city until 1971, when a deteriorating home stadium led the Jets to move to Charleston, West Virginia, as the Charleston Charlies.

=== Notable players ===
- Charlie Bishop
- Moe Burtschy
- Bob Cain
- Joe Coleman
- Art Ditmar
- Luke Easter
- Hank Foiles
- Marion Fricano
- Lou Limmer
- Jack Littrell
- Héctor López
- Jean-Pierre Roy
- Bob Trice
- Coaker Triplett
- Taft Wright

Year	Record	Finish	Attendance	Manager
1952	65–85	Seventh	153,152	Frank Skaff
1953	71–83	Sixth	149,219	Frank Skaff
1954	58–96	Eighth	93,982	Les Bell; Taft Wright

== See also ==
- Ottawa Giants
- Tommy Gorman
- Ottawa Lynx
