= List of baseball parks in Jersey City, New Jersey =

This is a list of venues used for professional baseball in Jersey City, New Jersey. It is a compilation of the information contained in the references listed.

Roosevelt Stadium

Grand Street Grounds
Home of:

Jersey City Jerseys – Eastern League (mid-1885 – 1886)
Jersey City Skeeters – International League (1887)

Location: Grand Street; and in the general vicinity of Prior Street and Montgomery Street
Currently: commercial and residential

Oakland Park
Home of:

Jersey City Skeeters – Central League (1888)
Jersey City Jerseys – Atlantic Association (1889 – mid-1890)
New York Giants – NL (1889 - 2 games)

Location: Oakland Avenue (northwest); Hoboken Avenue (southwest - grandstand location); Bonner (now Baldwin) Avenue (southeast); Fleet Street (northeast).
Currently: Residential, commercial buildings and New Jersey Route 139

Johnston Avenue Grounds
Home of: Jersey City – Atlantic League (1900)

and various local semi-pro clubs (1890s to about 1910s)

Location: Johnston Avenue, within the Lafayette neighborhood adjacent to Van Horne Street; and to the Morris Canal
Currently: Mostly residential

West Side Park (I) aka Skeeters Park
Home of:

Jersey City Skeeters – Eastern League (1902–1905)

Location: West Side Avenue (east), Belmont Avenue (south), Marcy Avenue (west), Duncan Avenue (north)
Formerly: Jersey City Golf Club
Currently: Lincoln Park (developed and renamed in 1930)

West Side Park (II) aka Skeeters Park
Home of: Jersey City Skeeters – International League (1906–1933)
Location: West Side Avenue (northwest, first base); Bay View Avenue (northeast, third base); buildings and Hudson Boulevard (now JFK Boulevard) (southeast, left field); Audubon Street (southwest, right field); about 1 mile (1.6 km) southwest of the previous ballpark
Currently: New Jersey City University buildings

- Sanborn map of the ballpark, 1912
- Sanborn map of the ballpark site, 1950

Roosevelt Stadium
Home of:

Jersey City Giants – IL (1937–1950)
Brooklyn Dodgers – NL (1956–1957, 15 games)
Jersey City Reds / Jerseys – IL (1960–1961)
Jersey City Indians / Jersey City A's – EL (1977–1978)

Location: Droyer's Point (north, third base); State Highway 440 / Danforth Avenue (east, center field); Newark Bay (south and west, right field and home plate)
Currently: Residential and commercial development

== See also ==
- Lists of baseball parks
- Sports in Jersey City, New Jersey
