= Sports in Jersey City, New Jersey =

Sports in Jersey City, New Jersey, the third largest city in the New York metropolitan area, are part of the regional New York metro professional sports and media markets. The city has a rich sports history though it has not hosted a team of the Big Four professional sports leagues.

== Baseball ==
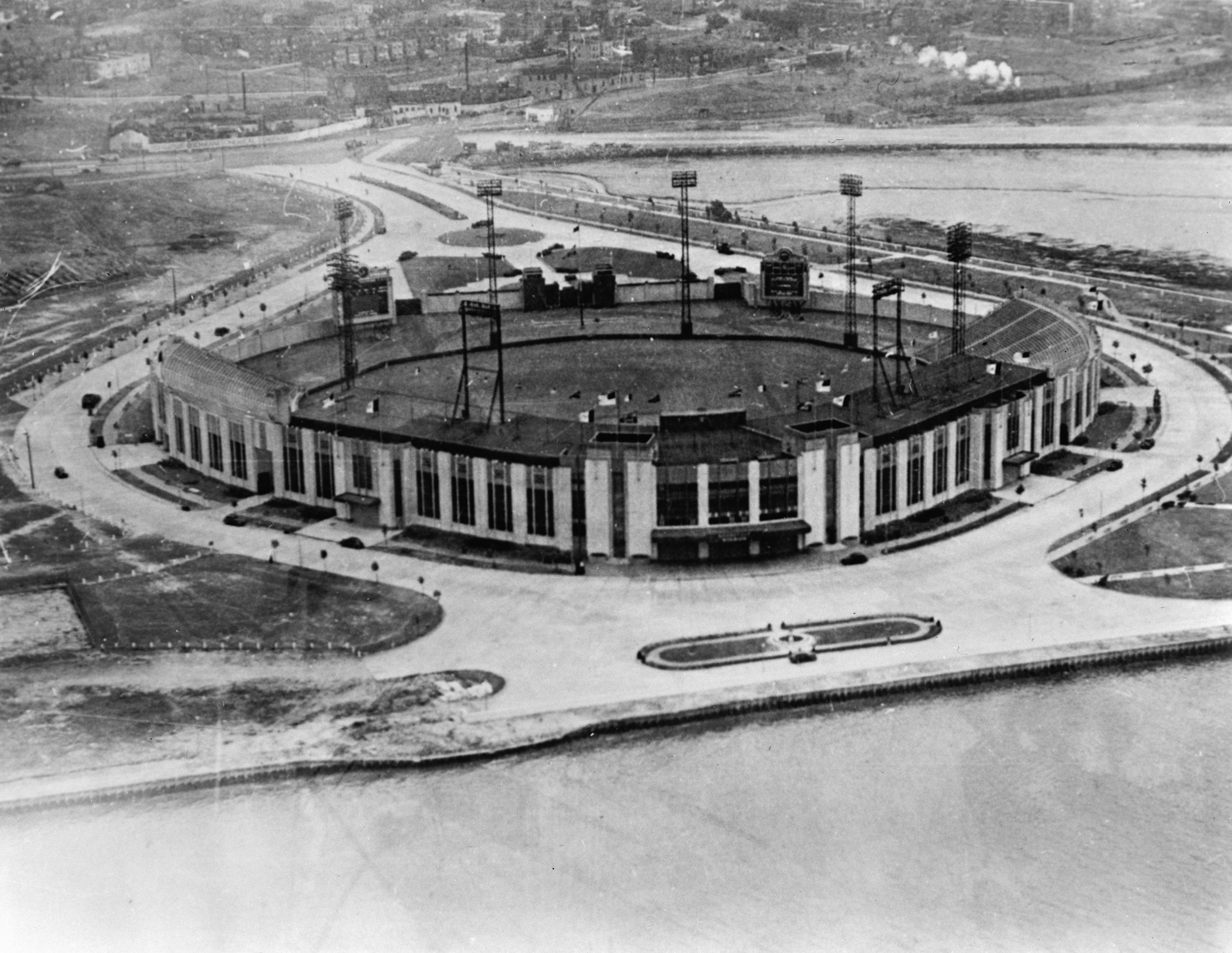
Aerial view of Roosevelt Stadium from over Newark Bay

From the earliest days of organized baseball, Jersey City was a prominent location for teams especially with neighboring Hoboken being the location of the first officially recorded organized game of baseball at the Elysian Fields on June 19, 1846. The Jersey City Skeeters were a minor league baseball team that existed from 1885 to 1933. From 1888 to 1889, they were owned by and a minor league team for the New York Giants of Major League Baseball (MLB). The Skeeters played at Oakland Park in the Jersey City Heights where the Giants opened the 1889 season playing two games against the Boston Beaneaters after being evicted from the original Polo Grounds. In 1902, the Skeeters moved to West Side Park, a site that would later become Lincoln Park in 1905 forcing them to move to a second West Side Park. In 1903, the Skeeters went 92–33 (.736) and won their first and only Eastern League title. For the 1932 season, the club became a farm team for the Brooklyn Dodgers. In 1933, the club relocated to Syracuse, New York. In 2001, the 1903 team was ranked 7th out of the 100 Best Minor League Baseball teams of the century and as of 2025, the teams' .736 winning percentage is the best in the history of minor league baseball. The second West Side Park was demolished and replaced by the College Towers housing co-op in 1956.

In 1937, Roosevelt Stadium opened at Droyer's Point and marked the return of baseball to the city with the Jersey City Giants of the International League (IL), the Triple-A affiliate of the New York Giants, playing there from 1937 to 1950. The 24,000-seat stadium was considered the best minor league ballpark of the time. The Giants won the International League regular-season pennant in 1939 and 1947 and were runners-up to the Syracuse Chiefs (the former Skeeters) in the Governors' Cup playoffs in 1942, but no Giants team would ever win a pennant in postseason play. The most historic baseball moment in the stadium's and city's history occurred on April 18, 1946, when the Giants hosted the Montreal Royals, the farm team of the Brooklyn Dodgers, marking the professional debut of the Royals' Jackie Robinson and the breaking of professional baseball's color barrier. Following the 1950 season, the New York Giants moved the club to Ottawa, Ontario due to drops in attendance.

Baseball returned to Jersey City again from 1956 to 1957 when Roosevelt Stadium hosted "home" games for the Brooklyn Dodgers during their last two seasons in Brooklyn – seven in 1956 and eight in 1957. The games were partly a negotiating tactic with the City of New York and the Borough of Brooklyn, in pursuit of a new stadium to replace Ebbets Field. The Dodgers agreed to rent Roosevelt Stadium from the city for an annual fee of $10,000 and agreed to absorb the cost of making the stadium ready for major league baseball. In return, the Dodgers received all parking and ticket revenue. Team owner, Walter O'Malley, added that if by 1958 their new stadium in Brooklyn was still under construction, the Dodgers could play the entire season in Jersey City. The Dodgers' negotiations with New York City came to naught and the team moved to Los Angeles in 1958.

In 1960, the Havana Sugar Kings of the IL moved to Jersey City from Havana, Cuba for the 1960 and 1961 season a year after winning the 1959 International League title. They were renamed the Jersey City Jerseys and played their games at Roosevelt Stadium. The Commissioner of Baseball, Ford Frick, felt forced by Secretary of State Christian Herter to move the club to protect the “safety and welfare” of club personnel and baseball's interests after Fidel Castro nationalized all U.S.-owned enterprises in Cuba.

Jersey City would see the last of professional baseball competition with the Jersey City Indians of the Double-A Eastern League (EL) in 1977 and, following a change in minor-league affiliation, the Jersey City A's of the EL in 1978 calling Roosevelt Stadium home. The stadium was demolished in 1985 after it became too expensive to repair and maintain and the site became a middle income housing development known as Society Hill in 1996.

== American football ==
In 1937, founding owner of the New York Football Giants of the NFL, Tim Mara, purchased the Stapleton Buffaloes of the American Football Association (AA) and moved the franchise to Jersey City in 1938. Mara renamed the club the Jersey City Giants and made them a minor league team for the New York Giants, the first in professional football. The Giants played their home games at Roosevelt Stadium from 1938 to 1950. Coached by Jersey City native Ed Franco and led by future Hall of Famer Ken Strong, the Giants won the league title in their first season and would win two more championships for a record three league titles (1938, 1940, 1946).

In 1960, Jersey City hosted a pre-season NFL game between the Green Bay Packers and New York Giants at Roosevelt Stadium to celebrate the city's 300th anniversary. The game was arranged by the Packers future Hall of Fame coach Vince Lombardi and Ed Franco who were teammates on the Fordham University's Seven Blocks of Granite offensive line.

In 1970, the city hosted the Jersey Jays of the Atlantic Coast Football League (ACFL), the farm team of the Cleveland Browns, at Roosevelt Stadium.

During the 1973 NFL season, the New York Giants practiced at Roosevelt Stadium while playing their home games in New Haven, Connecticut at the Yale Bowl. During this time, Giants Stadium was under construction across the Hackensack River at the Meadowlands Sports Complex.

Jersey City was a host city for Super Bowl XLVIII, held on February 2, 2014, at nearby MetLife Stadium, the home field of the New York Giants and New York Jets. The city hosted the Denver Broncos and the Seattle Seahawks at two hotels along the city's waterfront. The Super Bowl XLVIII Kickoff Spectacular was held in Liberty State Park by Communipaw Terminal and hosted by Erin Andrews, Jordin Sparks and Joe Buck on January 27, 2014. The event featured performances from Goo Goo Dolls and Daughtry followed by a 13-minute Macy's fireworks display featuring music from Bon Jovi, Bruce Springsteen, Alicia Keys, Lady Gaga and halftime show performer Bruno Mars.

== Basketball ==
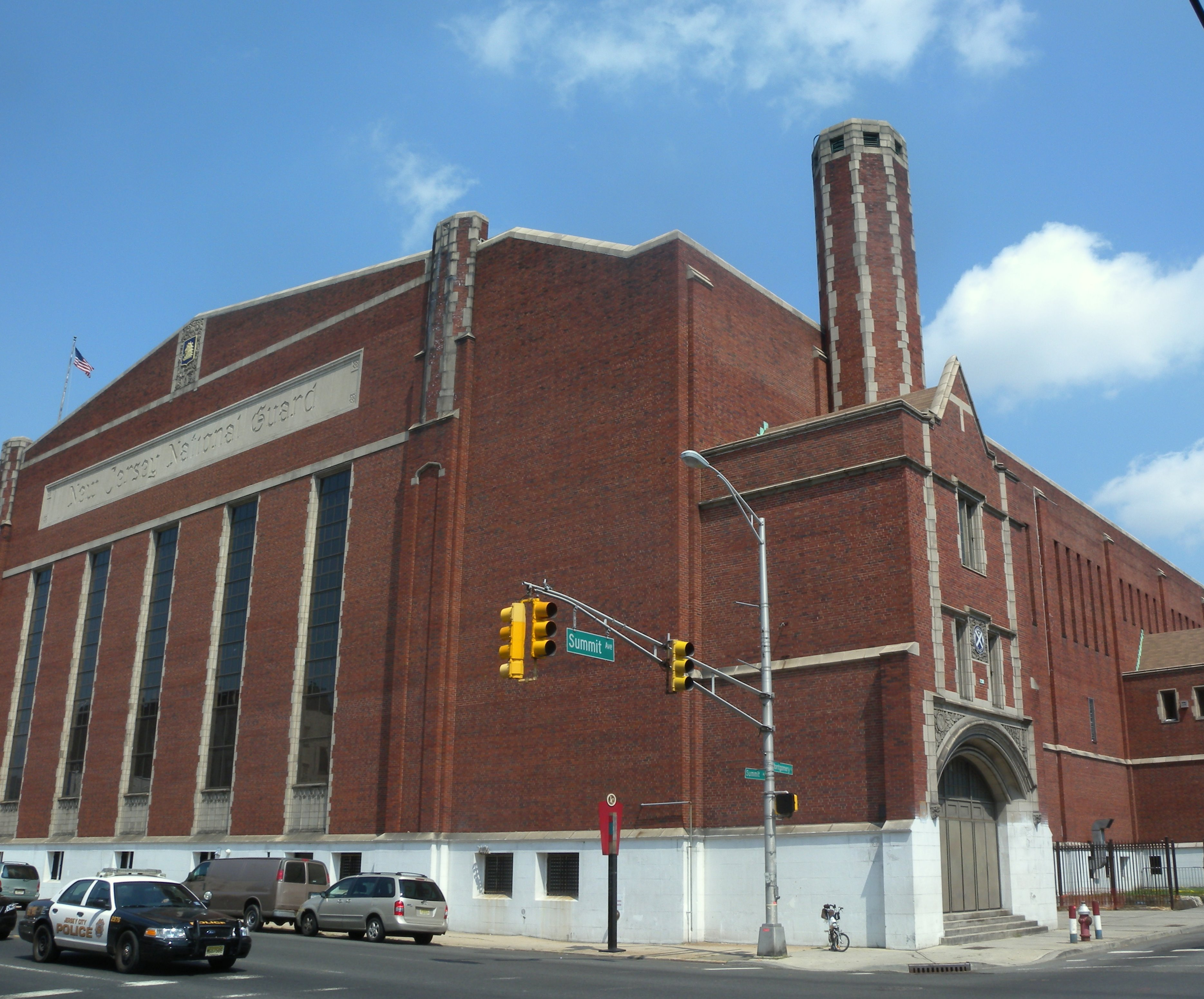
The Jersey City Armory

Jersey City has been a basketball talent hotbed for decades. The Fourth Regiment Armory (1895–1927), now the site of Hudson Catholic Regional High School, hosted several early semi-professional basketball teams such as the Jersey City Saints (1915–1916) and the Jersey City Skeeters (1917–1919, 1926). The 1919 Skeeters featured future Hall of Famers John Beckman and Nat Holman. From 1946 to 1948, the Jersey City Armory hosted the Jersey City Atoms of the professional American Basketball League. Owned by the Kellex Corporation, they also fielded a women's team called the Atom Flashes.

From the 1960s to 2017, the St. Anthony High School Friars varsity team were led by Hall of Fame coach Bob Hurley who coached the Friars to a record 28 state championships and 4 national championships for the most championships by a high school basketball program in United States history. The school was an integral part of the "NBA Pipeline" for young talent. The Friars held their practices at White Eagle Hall and often played home games at the Jersey City Armory, the city's premier indoor sports venue. St. Anthony closed in 2017 due to declining enrollment and a lack of funds to cover expenses despite efforts to save the school.

Since 2003, the Hamilton Park Summer League, hosted by the Jersey City Department of Recreation, has grown to become one of the premier summer basketball tournaments in New Jersey and the New York metropolitan area. The league features approximately 22 boys high school programs and 500 participants from Jersey City and New Jersey. The league was officially sanctioned by the NCAA in 2016.

The Saint Peter's Peacocks men's basketball team is the NCAA Division I intercollegiate men's basketball program that has been representing Saint Peter's University since the 1930–31 season. Saint Peter's hosted its games at the Jersey City Armory prior to the construction of Run Baby Run Arena on campus in 1975. The Peacocks are a founding member of the Metro Atlantic Athletic Conference (MAAC) since the 1981–82 season where they have compiled the second most wins of any MAAC team and have won the MAAC Championship five times (1991, 1995, 2011, 2022, 2024), tied for the third most all-time. The Peacocks have appeared in the NCAA tournament five times, including a historic run to the Elite Eight as the first 15-seed to do so in 2022 where they gained national recognition and finished the season ranked No. 24 in the nation by the USA Today Coaches Poll with the best NCAA post-season run and the most wins by a MAAC program in a single NCAA Tournament. The Peacocks previously achieved national recognition in the National Invitation Tournament (NIT), where they have appeared twelve times, in 1968 when they defeated the nationally ranked No. 10 Duke Blue Devils 100–71 in the 1968 NIT Quarterfinals in front of a sold-out crowd of 19,500 at Madison Square Garden. In 2017, the Peacocks competed in the 2017 CollegeInsider.com Postseason Tournament where they won their first national postseason title by defeating the Texas A&M–Corpus Christi Islanders 62–61 becoming just the second MAAC program to win a national postseason championship.

== Boxing ==
Jersey City has a long history with the sport and has been host to several high-profile boxing matches over the years. The city's first recorded professional boxing match took place on July 25, 1885, when Jack McAuliffe, nicknamed The Napoleon of the Prize Ring, knocked out Joe Milletecchia in the second round in Jersey City for his first win. By 1905, Newark established itself as New Jersey's boxing center, overtaking Jersey City as a major venue for professional boxing. By 1918, Jersey City again became a hotbed for pro boxing with 37 different boxing cards. Promoters came to Jersey City to avoid New York's taxes on boxing cards while enabling bigger purses for promoters and boxers without a substantinal decrease in attendance and revenue. By 1919, Jersey City surpassed Newark to become the state's boxing mecca hosting a total of 45 fight cards.

The second West Side Park became a top outdoor venue for pro boxing hosting several fights. On July 3, 1918, Jersey City native Frankie Burns, defeated Pete Herman in a 10-round decision for his first win, avenging his previous loss for the world bantamweight title in New Orleans a year earlier. Burns, who would become the featherweight champion of the world, fought seven times in Jersey City. On July 19, 1918, Kid Norfolk defeated former World Colored Heavyweight Champion, Joe Jeanette who first boxed in Jersey City in 1904. The biggest fight held at West Side Park was between Georges Carpentier and World Light Heavyweight Champion, Barney "Battling" Levinsky, on October 12, 1920, in front of sold-out crowd of 15,000. Carpentier defeated Levinsky, who held the title for four years against 59 challengers, by knock-out in the fourth-round, qualifying to fight Jack Dempsey for the heavyweight championship the following summer in Jersey City.

The boxing match billed as The Fight of the Century between Jack Dempsey and Georges Carpentier for the world heavyweight championship took place at Boyle's Thirty Acres on July 3, 1921. The arena was a 300,000 square feet (28,000 m^{2}) octagonal wooden bowl that seated 80,000 spectators specifically built for the event by promotor Tex Rickard. Dempsey defeated Carpentier by knock-out in the fourth-round retaining his title. The match became the first world title fight to be broadcast over radio via a temporary transmitter on top of Hoboken Terminal. It was also the first boxing match to produce $1,000,000 in revenue, or "million dollar gate" at a then record of $1,789,238. Boyle's would see additional matches over the next few years featuring boxers such as Johnny Wilson, Panama Joe Gans, Mike McTigue, Johnny Buff, Benny Leonard, Lew Tendler, Luis Ángel Firpo, Jess Willard, Harry Wills, Tiger Flowers, Paul Berlenbach, and James J Braddock aka the Cinderella Man. The venue was demolished in 1927 and is now the site of the Mill Creek Gardens public housing development.

When Roosevelt Stadium opened in 1937, it became the city's main outdoor venue for boxing matches. In 1940, former heavyweight champion Max Baer defeated "Two Ton Tony" Galento. On September 21, 1948, European champion Marcel Cerdan of France defeated Tony Zale for the world middleweight championship title in one of several Tournament of Champions bouts held at the stadium. On August 9, 1950, Sugar Ray Robinson defeated the former 3-time New Jersey State Champion Charley Fusari to defend his welterweight title.

Both the Fourth Regiment Armory and the current Jersey City Armory saw numerous matches featuring Johnny Dundee, Mickey Donley, Jack Britton, Ted "Kid" Lewis, Gene Tunney, James J Braddock, Rubin "Hurricane" Carter, Sonny Liston and Chuck Wepner, aka the Bayonne Bleeder. Braddock enjoyed boxing in Jersey City going 12–0 in matches in the city. Liston's last fight before his death was at the Armory where he defeated Wepner in the ninth-round on June 29, 1970. The last major boxing card held in the city was on June 2, 1978, with Wepner defeating Tom Healy in a five-round knockout. The following year on July 29, 1979, mayor Thomas F. X. Smith and Muhammad Ali "boxed" for three rounds in front of a crowd of 8,000 as part of fundraiser for the Jersey City Medical Center.

By 1980, Atlantic City became the home of pro boxing in New Jersey with no professional matches in Jersey City until 2000 and again in 2015 when the armory hosted the "Fists of the Fighting Irish" pro boxing event. The city has still been represented in the boxing world with Mark Medal, Arturo Gatti and Tomasz Adamek having fought out of Jersey City.

== Soccer ==
Jersey City has hosted several professional soccer matches at Roosevelt Stadium. On June 19, 1960, the city hosted the International Soccer League (ISL), an affiliate league of the American Soccer League, debut double-header matches where Burnley F.C. defeated OGC Nice 4–0 and Kilmarnock F.C. defeated the New York Americans 3–1. On June 20, 1971, the stadium hosted a North American Soccer League (NASL) and international soccer double-header where the New York Cosmos defeated the Dallas Tornado 3–1 and Bologna defeated West Ham United 2–1.

Pelé and Santos FC played twice at Roosevelt Stadium. Santos and Bologna played to a 1–1 draw on June 27, 1971, and Santos defeated Lazio 3–0 in a shortened match after many in the crowd of 26,145 fans stormed the field on May 25, 1973.

In 2017, the New York Red Bulls of Major League Soccer (MLS) entered into a partnership with New Jersey City University (NJCU) to allow national and international soccer teams to train at the university's Thomas M. Gerrity Complex ahead of their matches at Sports Illustrated Stadium in neighboring Harrison. The French Guiana national football team were the first team to train at the field ahead of their 2017 CONCACAF Gold Cup match against the Canada men's national soccer team.

In 2026, Jersey City will host the FIFA Fan Festival for the New York/New Jersey area at Liberty State Park as part of the 2026 FIFA World Cup. The final will be held at nearby MetLife Stadium along with five group stage matches, one match in the round of 32 and one match in the round of 16.

== Golf ==
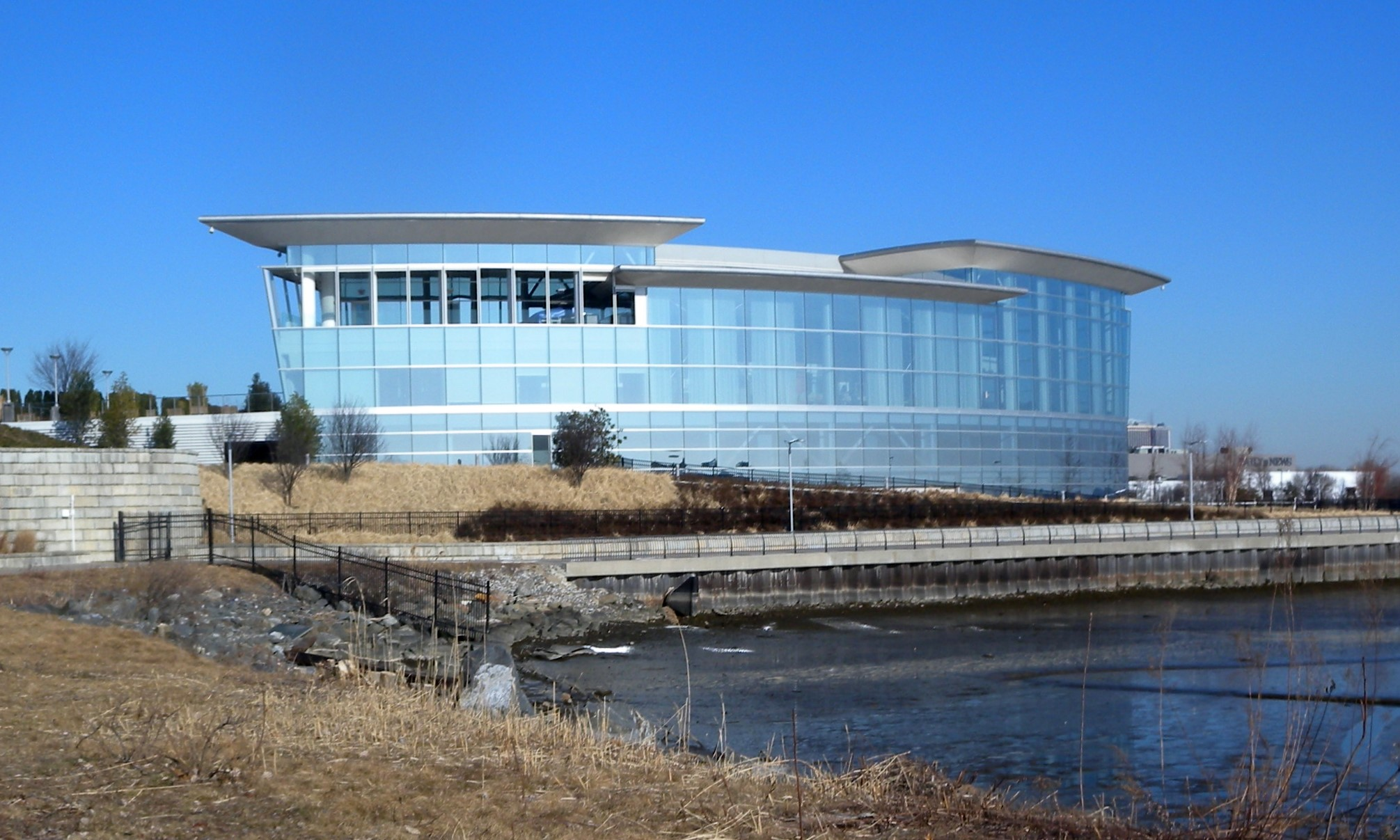
Liberty National clubhouse

Since the opening in 2006 of Liberty National Golf Club on Upper New York Bay, designed by Robert E. Cupp and Tom Kite, Jersey City has become a major host for professional golf tours. Liberty National has hosted The Northern Trust (formerly known as The Barclays and the Westchester Classic) on the PGA Tour on several occasions, including in 2009, 2013, 2019, and 2021. Since 2023, the course hosts the Mizuho Americas Open on the LPGA Tour (2023, 2024, 2025). From September 28 to October 1, 2017, Liberty National hosted the Presidents Cup where the United States team, led by captain Steve Stricker, defeated the International team by a score of 19–11 for their seventh straight victory.

== See also ==
- Sports in Newark, New Jersey
- Pershing Field
