= Jersey City Armory =

Armory in Jersey City, New Jersey, U.S.

Coordinates: 40°43′29″N 74°3′55″W

- 678 Montgomery Street; Jersey City, New Jersey
- Facade on Montgomery Street from corner of Jordan Avenue (2026)

Site information
- Type: Armory
- Controlled by: New Jersey National Guard

Site history
- Built: 1934–1936
- Architect: Kelly & Gruzen
- In use: 1937–present
- Materials: Granite and brick

The Jersey City Armory is an armory for the U.S. Army National Guard at 678 Montgomery Street in the McGinley Square neighborhood in Jersey City, New Jersey. Completed in 1937, the armory was designed by Chief Architect General Hugh A. Kelly of the Jersey City firm of Kelly and Gruzen in the Beaux-Arts style. In addition to being a military training and mustering facility of the New Jersey National Guard (New Jersey National Guard 2/113 Infantry 250 Jersey City), the WPA era armory has long been used as a sports arena, particularly for boxing, basketball, and track and field events, and more recently, mixed martial arts.

Under the auspices of the New Jersey Department of Military Affairs, the armory is leased to the city for community and political events and extracurricular sports programs. It has also been used as a film studio.

== History and architecture ==
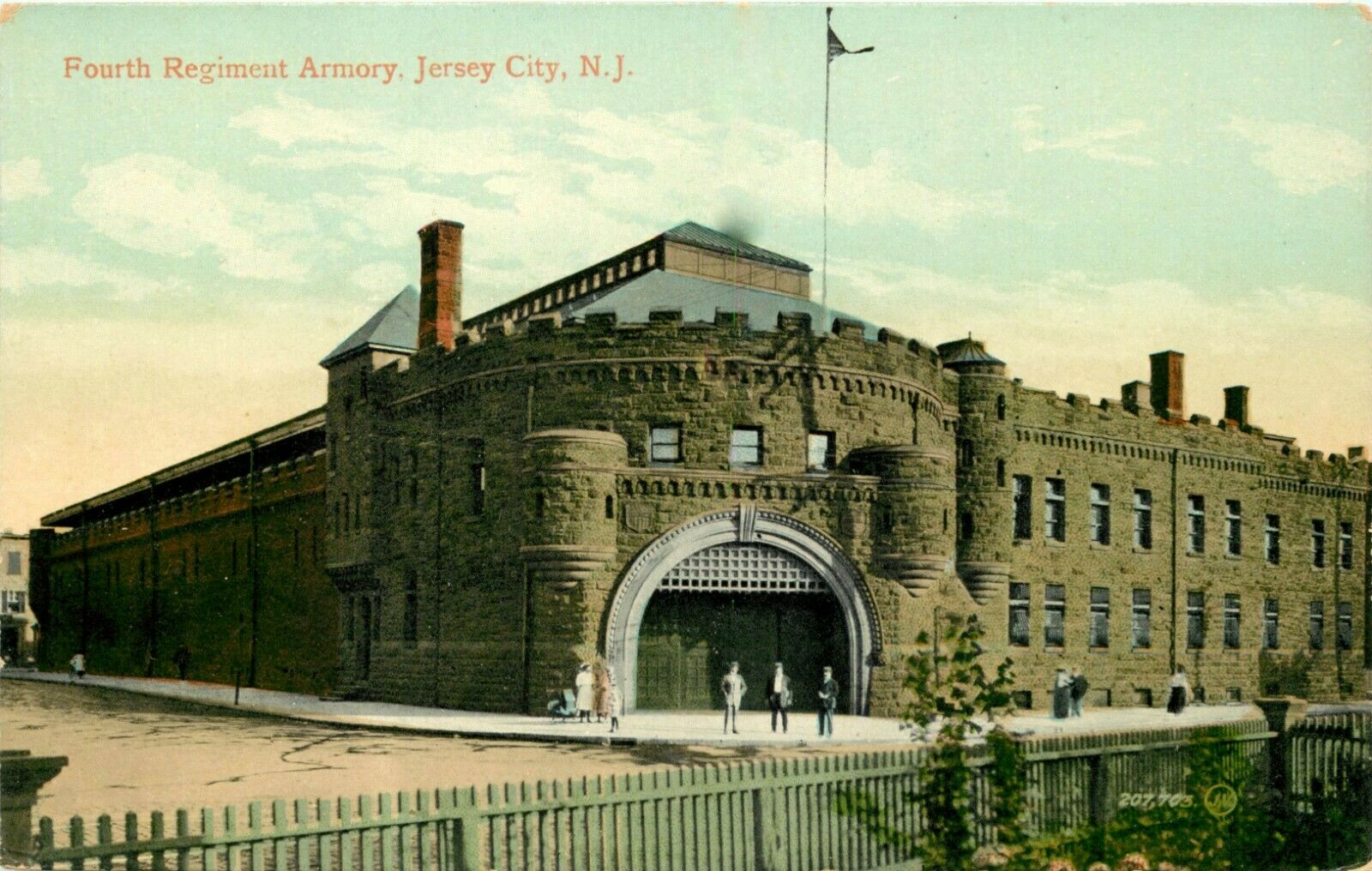
Fourth Regiment Armory, 1908

The current armory was built to replace the previous Fourth Regiment Armory located on McGinley Square at Bergen Avenue, Mercer Street, and Tuers Avenue, the current site of Hudson Catholic Regional High School. It had been built in 1895 and was designed in the Richardson Romanesque style, which was popular at the time for commercial, industrial and educational institutions. The Fourth Regiment Armory quickly became the premier indoor sports and social venue for the city. Several early semi-professional basketball teams called the armory home such as the Jersey City Saints (1915–1916) and the Jersey City Skeeters (1917–1919, 1926). The 1919 Skeeters featured future Hall of Famers John Beckman and Nat Holman. In the early hours of June 17, 1927, a large three-alarm fire swept through the entire facility and destroyed the structure. In 1941, the large archway and turrets that served as a portion of the entrance façade from the previous armory were erected at Pershing Field Park in the Jersey City Heights.

=== Features ===
Opening in 1937, the armory was constructed between 1934 and 1936 as a Works Progress Administration project during the Great Depression along with the city's other premier sports venue, the since-demolished Roosevelt Stadium. The armory was designed by General Hugh A. Kelly, who was a friend of former Jersey City mayor Frank Hague. Hugh Clark, a graduate of Cooper Union and a Jersey City resident, was appointed by General Kelly to execute the project with J.K. Harris-Smith, who was a fellow Jersey City architect.

The exterior of the three-story Beaux-Arts structure features English Renaissance details with a brick-walled exterior and terra cotta trim above a granite base. Three terra cotta panels featuring military insignia are on the three protruding pavilions' second story. On the Montgomery Street façade, "New Jersey National Guard" is engraved in a strip of stone. The main entryway fronts Jordan Avenue and features a large retractable iron gate. The roof of the armory spans the 175,000 square feet interior, making it the largest armory in New Jersey.

The interior of the armory was designed to accommodate two medical units, one battalion each of infantry and engineers and one naval militia division. The drill hall is at street level and features rows of seating on two sides of the facility. The basement features eight company rooms and several equipment storage rooms. Additionally, there are two mezzanine floors with four company rooms and flex space.

Construction was completed in February 1936 at a construction cost of $1,038,276 and a total project cost of $1,098,330.

=== Renovations ===
In 1987 and 1998, the armory underwent renovations to create space for the Jersey City Youth Center to sponsor more youth services at the facility. The renovations sought to include various educational and self-development programs in a safe environment.

Between 2005 and 2009, the armory underwent a two-phase $5.7 million renovation funded by the New Jersey Department of Military and Veterans Affairs to turn the facility into a modern sports arena. The first phase included a new running track, basketball court, upgraded lighting, and a four-sided center-hung scoreboard. The second phase saw new restrooms on the first floor and upper level, along with two new locker rooms and new operable windows on the Montgomery Street side of the facility. In 2010, the State of New Jersey spent $105,000 to repair the sidewalks around the armory.

== Notable events ==
The New Jersey National Guard maintains 64 armories within 46 communities as part of the New Jersey Department of Military Affairs. Some are used for non-military activities, such as the Teaneck Armory, home to the former New Jersey Nets in their first season.

=== Sports ===
The former and current armories in have played an important role in sports in Jersey City, and in Hudson County and New Jersey's pugilist past, which includes the 1921 Dempsey – Carpentier world heavyweight championship at Boyle's Thirty Acres. The current armory has hosted many bouts, including those with James J. Braddock, aka the Cinderella Man, Rubin "Hurricane" Carter, Sonny Liston and Chuck Wepner, aka the Bayonne Bleeder. In a 1979 fundraiser for the Jersey City Medical Center, then-Mayor of Jersey City, Thomas F. X. Smith, challenged Muhammad Ali to an exhibition bout, and went three rounds before a crowd of 8,000. In 2010, the first fight card returned to the Armory in three decades with the mixed martial arts Urban Conflict Championship. Trials for the World Professional Jiu-Jitsu Cup 2011 took place in February 2011. The armory hosted the "Fists of the Fighting Irish" pro boxing event in 2015.

In the late 1950s and early 1960s, professional wrestling events were held featuring Antonino Rocca, Bobo Brazil, Buddy Rogers aka Nature Boy, the Fabulous Kangaroos, Bruno Sammartino and Johnny Valentine. Pro wrestling events produced by Jersey All Pro Wrestling have also occurred in the arena.

From 1949 to 1953, the armory was home to Jersey Jolters of the National Roller Derby League. Manhattan based WPIX broadcast several team matches on television throughout the metropolitan area.

The arena has hosted countless basketball games over the years, including those played by the former St. Anthony High School, ten-time winners of New Jersey's Tournament of Champions and considered the winningest high school basketball program with the most championships in United States history. The school's long-time Naismith Memorial Basketball Hall of Fame coach, Bob Hurley, was instrumental in bringing about the renewal of the basketball court and other renovations to the armory.

From 2005 to 2021, the annual Dan Finn Classic, a day-long tournament of high school basketball games, was held at the armory. The event was in memory of Dan Finn, a St. Peter's Preparatory School and Fordham University graduate who died in an accident and, as an organ donor, was able to assist four people after his death. The tournament ceased after 2021 as a result of the COVID-19 pandemic but raised more than $1 million for local academic and humanitarian causes. In 2025, the Dan Finn Classic resumed as a soccer tournament held at nearby Lincoln Park.

From 1946 to 1948, the armory hosted the Jersey City Atoms of the American Basketball League. Owned by the Kellex Corporation, they also fielded a women's team called the Atom Flashes. After one full season and a playoff run, the team moved to Scranton midway through the 1947/48 season.

Before the opening of the Yanitelli Center on its nearby campus in 1975, Saint Peter's University hosted its home games at the armory. Since the armory's renovation in the mid-2000s, Saint Peter's has hosted several high-profile games at the arena.

On November 25, 2007, the Saint Peter's Peacocks took on the Rutgers Scarlet Knights in the first game Saint Peter's had played at the armory since 1975. The Peacocks defeated the Scarlet Knights 65–58.

On December 13, 2008, Saint Peter's hosted the Seton Hall Pirates men's and women's basketball teams in an afternoon doubleheader as part of Saint Peter's Hall of Fame Day. This was the second straight game for the Peacocks men's basketball team at the armory and the first-ever game for the Peacocks women's basketball team at the armory. The Pirates would go on to win both games over the Peacocks. Saint Peter's held their 2008 Hall of Fame Inductee ceremony during halftime of the men's game.

For decades the armory has and continues to host several local, regional, and state (New Jersey State Interscholastic Athletic Association) track meets annually. Future Olympians Andy Stanfield and Charles Mays competed at the armory on the Lincoln High School track team.

=== Community ===
The armory has been used for large community events for decades with local politicians using the armory to hold large fundraisers and rallies. In 1938, mayor Frank Hague held an "Americanization Day" rally in an attempt to target Communists in local businesses and labor unions.

In 2004, the armory was the site of a memorial service for deceased Jersey City mayor Glenn Dale Cunningham attended by 5,000 and where in 2007 his wife Sandra Bolden Cunningham launched her political career.

In 2006, a funeral attended by thousands took place at the armory for Jersey City Police Officer Robert Nguyen. He and his partner, Shawn Carson, had died on December 25 after their patrol car plunged into the Hackensack River from the Lincoln Highway Hackensack River Bridge, which they were not informed had been opened. Along with traditional bagpipes, Buddhist monks participated in the ceremony, reflecting Nguyen's Vietnamese-American background.

In October and November 2012, the armory served as an emergency shelter for hundreds of Jersey City residents displaced after Hurricane Sandy struck the New York area. Homeless individuals went to the armory before the hurricane hit and were able to seek shelter. The 108th Wing of the New Jersey Air National Guard from Joint Base McGuire-Dix-Lakehurst provided services such as sleeping cots, shower locations, food and security for the displaced residents.

In November 2022, the armory hosted Art Fair 14C, the largest visual arts event in New Jersey.

== Film studio ==
The floor space and height of the Armory has led to it being used as a temporary studio for many projects, including Chazz Palminteri's A Bronx Tale, the Faye Dunaway thriller Eyes Of Laura Mars, Laura Brannigan's music video "Self-Control", Woody Allen's Deconstructing Harry, Terry Kinney's Diminished Capacity, A Perfect Murder by Andrew Davis and Jim Jarmusch's,Ghost Dog: The Way of the Samurai (1999).

== Location and transportation ==
The armory is located in the McGinley Square neighborhood of the Journal Square district in Jersey City. Nearby landmarks include the historic Art Deco Beacon residential complex, Hudson Catholic Regional High School, Saint Peter's University and Old Bergen Church.

The nearby Journal Square Transportation Center provides direct connections via the PATH rapid transit system to Newark, Harrison, Downtown Jersey City, Hoboken and Manhattan. Bus connections to points in Hudson County and to the Port Authority Bus Terminal are available on local streets or at the transit center. The armory is directly served by the 9 NJ Transit Bus route outside the main entrance on Montgomery Street. On-site parking is not available, but several lots are within walking distance.

== See also ==
- Schuetzen Park
- Paterson Armory
- National Guard Militia Museum of New Jersey
- Sports in Jersey City, New Jersey
