= Jersey City Skeeters =

- 1885–1933; Jersey City, New Jersey

Minor league affiliations
- Previous classes: AA (1912–1933); A (1902–1911); N/A (1885, 1887–1890, 1900)
- League: International League (1912–1915, 1918–1933); Eastern League (1902–1911); Atlantic League (1900); Atlantic Association (1889, 1890); Central League (1888); International League (1887); Eastern League (1885–1886)

Major league affiliations
- Previous teams: Brooklyn Dodgers (1932); New York Giants (1888–1889)

Minor league titles
- League titles: 1 (1903)

Team data
- Previous names: Jersey City (1900); Jersey City Gladiators (1890); Jersey City Jerseys (1886)
- Previous parks: West Side Park (II) (1906–1915, 1918–1933); West Side Park (1902–1905); Oakland Park (1888–1890); Grand Street Grounds (1885–1887)

The Jersey City Skeeters were a minor league baseball team which operated in Jersey City, New Jersey. The Skeeters started as an amateur club in the 1860s and by 1870 joined the National Association of Base Ball Players.

By 1885, Jersey City began playing at the Grand Street Grounds and had joined the Eastern League, but they dropped out before the end of the season. The club rejoined the league the following year as the Jersey City Jerseys (taking the place of the Trenton Trentonians) where they finished 2nd.

In 1887, a Jersey City Skeeters team was playing in the International League. In 1888, the club would go through several changes. The Skeeters transferred to the newly organized Central League, a much lower league, competition-wise. The club was then purchased by John B. Day, owner of the New York Giants, as a farm team for the Giants and moved to Oakland Park, which Day also purchased, in the Jersey City Heights. In 1889, the Skeeters moved to the newly organized Atlantic Association and but disbanded in late July. The club was revived for the 1890 season as the Jersey City Gladiators but got off to a dismal start. On July 19, 1890, with a record of 27-46 (.370), the club again disbanded mid-season. The club would again disband in June of the 1900 season playing as Jersey City.

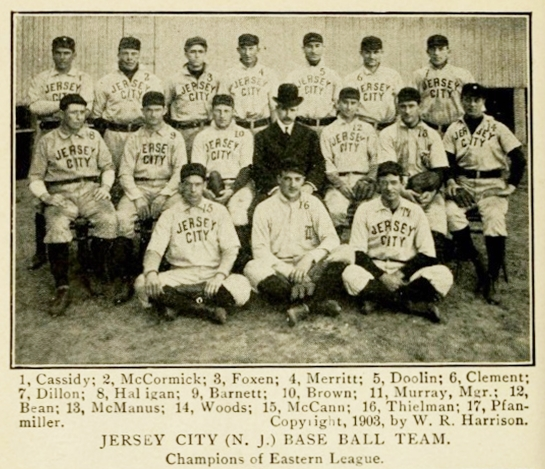
The 1903 Skeeters

The team participated in three other leagues before 1902, with little success. However, that same year the City of Jersey City built the club a new ballpark for the club called West Side Park and the team fully committed to the Eastern League. The new park seated 8,500 and was generally considered to be the best in the Eastern League. The Skeeters would finish in third place in their first year in the league, but in 1903, they fielded a championship team. That year, the team won their first 18 games, and had a stretch of 25 consecutive victories. They won their first and only league title with a record of 92–33 (.736). That team was managed by 39-year-old player-manager Billy Murray, who stayed with the team through 1906, but the team never won another championship. In 2001, the 1903 Skeeters were ranked 7th out of the 100 greatest minor league teams of all time. As of 2025, the 1903 teams' .736 winning percentage is still the best in the history of minor league baseball.

In 1905, the construction of Lincoln Park forced the club to look for a new home. In 1906, the city built a new 8,500 seat West Side Park (II) for the Skeeters 1 mile (1.6 km) down West Side Avenue between Culver and Audubon Avenues. The new ballpark was easily accessible by trolley lines and the CRRNJ West Side Avenue station.

The club suffered heavy financial losses in 1914 and on February 24, 1915 owners William Stephen Devery and Thomas A. Fogarty forfeited the franchise to the International League. The league ran the team for the one season and sold it to James R. Price and Fred Tenney, who moved the club to Newark, New Jersey after the 1915 season.

Olympic great Jim Thorpe played for the Skeeters in several months of the 1915 season, playing right field and batting near the top of the line up in the 2nd or 3rd spot. Thorpe hit .303, with 13 doubles, seven triples, and two home runs in 370 at-bats for the Skeeters, Newark, and Harrisburg that summer.

A newly organized International League formed in 1918, following World War I, and Jersey City received a league franchise. In the early 1920s, there was a push by the Jersey City Chamber of Commerce to change the team's name from Skeeters (so named because of the ubiquitous mosquitos in the New Jersey swamps) to the Colts. The ballpark briefly became "Colts Park". However, fans rejected the Colts moniker and the Skeeters name stuck.

In 1928, left field was reduced from 404 feet (123 m) to 329 feet (100 m), and right field from 345 feet (105 m) to 320 feet (98 m). This was done to increase offense in an attempt to increase attendance.

For the 1932 season, the club became a farm team for the Brooklyn Dodgers. By 1933, the Great Depression caused the folding of many leagues and teams and the Skeeter's attendance was half what it had been the year before, averaging fewer than 1,000 a game. As a result, the Jersey City franchise was moved to Syracuse, New York, at the end of the 1933 season. West Side Park (II) was demolished and replaced in 1956 by College Towers, the first middle-income housing cooperative apartment complex in New Jersey.

Baseball returned to Jersey City in 1937 with the opening of Roosevelt Stadium and the New York Giants moving their highest-level (Triple-A) minor league team to the city, calling them the Jersey City Giants.

The team name was revived as a vintage base ball team in 2009.
