= West Side Park (Jersey City baseball) =

Baseball park in Jersey City, New Jersey

West Side Park Skeeter Park
- Interactive map of West Side Park; Skeeter Park
- Location: Jersey City, New Jersey
- Coordinates: 40.724640°N 74.080939°W
- Capacity: 8,500
- Surface: Grass

Construction
- Built: 1902
- Demolished: 1905

Tenant
- Jersey City Skeeters (1902–1905)

West Side Park was the name of two different baseball parks in Jersey City, New Jersey in the early 20th Century. Both parks were also called Skeeters Park in reference to the long-time nickname of the teams, the "Jersey City Skeeters", so called because of the many mosquitoes ("skeeters") which lived in Jersey City's marsh lands.

== First ballpark ==
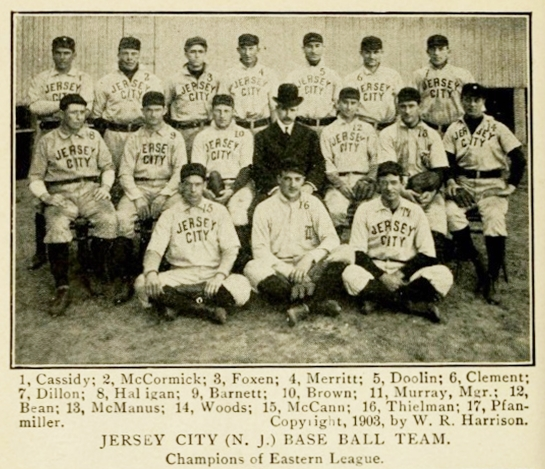
The 1903 Skeeters

The first West Side Park was the home of the Jersey City Skeeters of the Eastern League from 1902 through 1905. The 8,500 seat ballpark was built by the City of Jersey City and was generally considered to be the best in the Eastern League.

The ballpark's location was given in local newspapers as "West Side Avenue and the foot of (or 'end of') Belmont Avenue." The city directories gave a less precise location, "West Side Avenue." The lot was leased from the Jersey City Golf Club. Its location has also been given as "West Side Avenue (east); Belmont Avenue (south); Marcy Avenue (west); and Duncan Avenue (north)."

The 1903 club was successful, winning the league championship with a record of 92–33 (.736) for the only time in the club's years of operating along West Side Avenue. In 2001, the 1903 Skeeters were ranked 7th out of the 100 greatest minor league teams of all time and as of 2025, the 1903 teams' .736 winning percentage is still the best in the history of minor league baseball.

When the Hudson County Park Commission began to develop a new public park in 1904, the ballpark stood in the way of its planned entrance road. In 1905, the city informed the Skeeters they would have to find another venue by 1906.

The new county park was also dubbed West Side Park. The potential for confusion was mitigated by the papers often referring to the ballpark as "West Side Park baseball grounds". The park was eventually renamed Lincoln Park in 1930.

== Second ballpark ==
1912 diagram of the ballpark

The second West Side Park ballpark was the home of the Jersey City Skeeters of the Eastern League / International League from 1906 through 1915, and then again from 1918 through 1933.

The 8,500 seat ballpark's location in city directories from 1908 onward was given as "Jersey City Baseball Grounds, West Side Avenue corner Fisk Street." It was about 1 mile (1.6 km) mile southwest of the previous ballpark and was easily accessible by trolley lines and the CRRNJ West Side Avenue station.

Newspapers reported the location as "West Side and Culver Avenues." Its precise location, as shown in Sanborn maps, was West Side Avenue (northwest, first base); Bay View Avenue (not a through street there) and then Culver Avenue (northeast, third base); buildings and Hudson Boulevard (now JFK Boulevard) (southeast, left field); and Audubon Street (southwest, right field). Fisk tied into West Side Avenue from the west, near the main grandstand entrance.

The Skeeters suffered heavy financial losses in 1914 and on February 24, 1915 owners William Stephen Devery and Thomas A. Fogarty forfeited the franchise to the International League. The league ran the team for the one season and sold it to James R. Price and Fred Tenney, who moved the club to Newark, New Jersey after the 1915 season.

A newly organized International League formed in 1918, following World War I, and Jersey City received a league franchise. In the early 1920s, there was a push by the Jersey City Chamber of Commerce to change the team's name from Skeeters to the Colts. The ballpark briefly became "Colts Park", however, fans rejected the Colts moniker and the Skeeters name stuck.

During the 1920s, the New York Yankees played several exhibition games against their top minor league affiliate, the Newark Bears, at the ballpark.

One attempt to impact attendance was to shorten the home run distances. The original ballpark's dimensions were rather expansive. In 1928, left field was reduced from 404 feet (123 m) to 329 feet (100 m), and right field from 345 feet (105 m) to 320 feet (98 m).

By 1933, the Great Depression caused the folding of many leagues and teams and the Skeeter's attendance was half what it had been the year before, averaging fewer than 1,000 a game. As a result, the Jersey City franchise was moved to Syracuse, New York, at the end of the 1933 season.

== Later ==
After the Skeeters folded, the ballpark site was acquired by the school later known as New Jersey City University. They had already constructed their main building east of the ballpark in 1927. The ballpark was later demolished and replaced in 1956 by College Towers, the first middle-income housing cooperative apartment complex in New Jersey.

Minor league baseball returned to Jersey City in 1937 with the New York Giants moving their (Triple-A) affiliate, the Jersey City Giants, to the newly built Roosevelt Stadium. The Giants would win the IL titles for 1939 and 1947 and be runners-up to the Syracuse Chiefs (formerly the Skeeters) in the Governors' Cup playoffs in 1942.

== See also ==
- Sports in Jersey City, New Jersey
