= Allentown Peanuts =

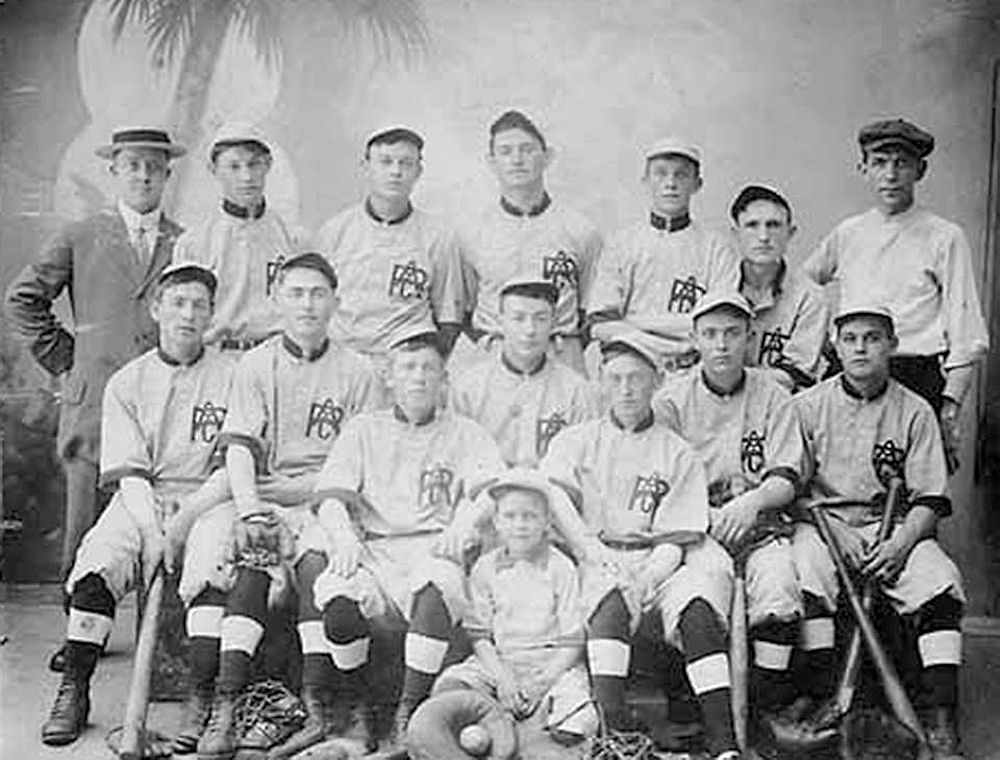
The 1898 Allentown Peanuts Baseball Club

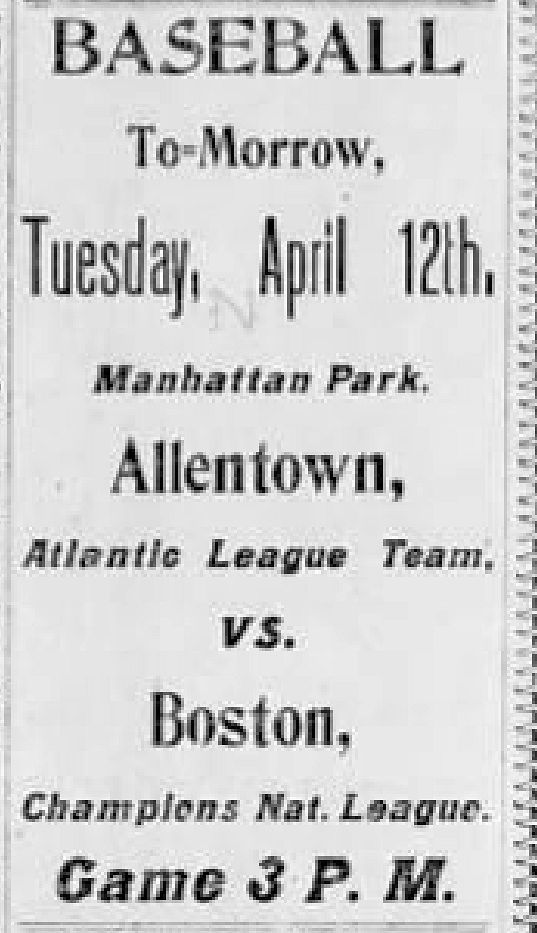
An advertisement for an Allentown Peanuts Baseball Club game against

Allentown Peanuts refers to two baseball teams: one that played in the Central League in 1888, and another that played in the Atlantic League from 1898 to 1900. They were based in Allentown, Pennsylvania and had no big league affiliations.

In 1898, they went 55-67 under managers James McGeehan and Billy Sharsig, and in 1899 they went 37-47 under manager Sharsig.
