= Oakland Park (Jersey City, New Jersey) =

Ballpark in the United States

Coordinates: 40.734047°N 74.055565°W

Oakland Park was a ballpark in The Heights neighborhood of Jersey City, New Jersey. It was the home of the minor league baseball club, the Jersey City Skeeters, from 1888 to 1890. The club briefly disbanded in July 1889 and was revived as the Jersey City Gladiators in 1890 but would disband again in July 1890. The park continued to be used by other local teams for several years after. It hosted the New York Giants of Major League Baseball for their first two home games in 1889 following their eviction from the Polo Grounds.

== History ==
On April 20, 1885, ground was broken for Oakland Park and construction was carried out by the New Jersey Exhibition Company (NJEC). The Erie Railroad leased the land to the NJEC for the construction of the ballpark. Oakland Park opened less than a month later on May 2, 1885 with a game between the Jersey Blues and the Oaklands of Brooklyn.

In February 1888, under the new ownership of John B. Day, the Skeeters began leasing the ballpark after relocated from the Grand Street Grounds. The club also transferred to the newly organized Central League, a much lower league, competition-wise. Day was the first owner of the New York Giants and purchased the Skeeters to serve as a farm team for the Giants. The Giants also used Oakland Park to host spring training and exhibition games.

On April 19, 1888, the Jersey City Skeeters (under the temporary name Gladiators), managed by Patrick T. Powers, played their first game at Oakland Park against the Syracuse Stars with Jersey City defeating Syracuse 13–1 in front of 2,000 fans.

In 1889, the Skeeters moved to the newly organized Atlantic Association and but disbanded in late July. The club was revived for the 1890 season as the Jersey City Gladiators but got off to a dismal start. On July 19, 1890, with a record of 27-46 (.370), the club again disbanded mid-season.

The Skeeters would be revived again and in 1902 move to a new city-built ballpark called West Side Park.

Oakland Park was located on a 202,000 sq ft (18,800 m^{2}) block bounded by Oakland Avenue (northwest); Hoboken Avenue (southwest); Bonner (now Baldwin) Avenue (southeast); and Fleet Street (northeast) that overlooked Downtown Jersey City and Hoboken. The Erie Railroad's Long Dock Tunnel ran under one corner of the ballpark site. The ballpark was an enclosure of 60,000 sq ft (5,600 m^{2}) made of wood and sat approximately 6,000 people. It had a "high, tight and substantial" outfield fence and an "extensive" grandstand covering most of the bleachers. In 1888, newspapers reported that the grandstand was to be built along Hoboken Avenue to shade the fans from the sun. Given the orientation of the block, that suggests home plate to center field pointed roughly northeast.

=== Major League Baseball ===
The New York Giants, led by manager Jim Mutrie, first played at Oakland Park as guests on the morning of September 3, 1888 when they took on their minor league Jersey City Skeeters in an exhibition game. The Skeeters won the game by a surprising score of 8–2 in front of 5,000 fans.

The following year in 1889, the City of New York had evicted the Giants from the original Polo Grounds at 110th Street and 5th Avenue in Manhattan in order to extend the city's street grid north of Central Park and to resolve complaints about rowdy crowds in the neighborhood. As a result, the Giants were compelled to find temporary home fields until they could secure a more permanent ballpark. Along with Oakland Park, the Giants considered five different sites in Long Island City, Hoboken, Staten Island and Upper Manhattan where they would ultimately build their new home field.

They decided upon Staten Island, but the grounds were not ready on short notice. Therefore the Giants opened the 1889 season at Oakland Park on April 24 & 25 against the Boston Beaneaters. The Beaneaters won the first game on April 24, 8–7 and the Giants won the second game on April 25, 11–10. A third game between Boston and New York had been scheduled for the 26th, but it was rained out.

They moved their next home game on April 29 to the St. George Grounds on Staten Island where they would remain for the next two months. The Giants played their last home game at St. George on June 14 and finished their time at the ground with a record of 17–6. After a lengthy road trip, on July 8 they finally debuted their new home field at 155th Street and 8th Avenue in Upper Manhattan. They dubbed this field the new Polo Grounds. That general area would be the Giants' home through the 1957 season.

Despite the nomadic nature of their 1889 season, the Giants would win the National League championship, edging out Boston by one game. In October 1889, the Giants would go on to defeat their arch rival, the Brooklyn Bridegrooms, in the NL-AA World Series 6 games to 3.

== Site today ==
In 1906, the Erie Railroad sold the ballpark property to the National Realty Company of Jersey City, which then subdivided the property into individual lots for purchase. Soon after the ballpark was demolished and the area is now a mixture of residential housing and home to the General Pencil Company. NJ Route 139 runs through a portion of the site as well.

Preceded by Polo Grounds	Home of the New York Giants; 1889	Succeeded by St. George Grounds
