= James R. Price =

American journalist (1862–1929)

James Rigby Price (1862–1929) was an American sports journalist and baseball executive.

Price was born in 1862 in Baltimore. He began his career in sports as a sportswriter and spent many years working for various New York City papers. Price is credited with coining the nickname Yankees for the city's American League baseball club during his time as sports editor of the New York Press, as he found it easier to fit in headlines than the team's existing nicknames, the Highlanders and Hilltoppers. He remained with the Press until 1916, when the paper merged with The Sun.

In 1909, Price was backed for the presidency of the Eastern League by three owners who were displeased with the incumbent Patrick T. Powers. Powers was reelected after the opposing owners were unable to get enough votes to defeat him. In 1913 he was appointed by Governor William Sulzer to succeed James Edward Sullivan on the New York State Athletic Commission. He resigned in 1915 and was succeeded by Frank Dwyer.

As part of Major League Baseball's settlement with the Federal League, MLB acquired Harrison Park in New Jersey from Harry Ford Sinclair and placed Price in charge of the property. On February 19, 1916, he and Fred Tenney purchased the Jersey City Skeeters of the International League and moved the club to Harrison Park, where they became the Newark Indians. Price served as the team's president while Tenney was the club's manager. The Indians folded after the 1917 season and were replaced by the Newark Bears. Price continued to manage Harrison Park until it was destroyed by fire in 1923. Price then served as the New York-based press agent for American League president Ban Johnson.

In 1924, Price joined the Boston Red Sox as the team's secretary. In 1926, severe heart trouble prevented him from traveling with the club except for spring training. On January 29, 1929, he committed suicide at Fenway Park. He was found by traveling secretary Hiram Mason bleeding on the east ramp leading to the grandstands. He had used a razor to cut his throat. He was rushed to Boston City Hospital where he was pronounced dead. His ongoing health problems were reported to be the cause of his suicide. He was interred at Green Mount Cemetery in Baltimore.
