= 2025 International League season =

2025 Baseball season

2025 International League Season
- League: International League
- Sport: Baseball
- Duration: March 28, 2025 - September 21, 2025
- Games: 150
- Teams: 20
- TV partner: MiLB.tv

Regular season
- Season MVP: Batter–Dylan Beavers (Norfolk); Pitcher–Mick Abel (Lehigh Valley/St. Paul)
- Finals champions: Jacksonville (2nd)
- Runners-up: Scranton/Wilkes-Barre

IL seasons
- ← 2024 2026 →

The 2025 International League season (IL) was the 112th season of the International League. It began on March 28, 2025 with a game between the Memphis Redbirds and Louisville Bats at Louisville Slugger Field in Louisville, Kentucky. The season ended on September 21, 2025. As with all seasons since 2021, no Triple-A All-Star Game is planned.

The Jacksonville Jumbo Shrimp defeated the Scranton/Wilkes-Barre RailRiders, 2 games to 1, to win the International League championship, their first since 1968. They went on to defeat the Las Vegas Aviators, 8–7, in the 2025 Triple-A Baseball National Championship Game at Las Vegas Ballpark in Las Vegas, Nevada.

== Rule changes ==
The Automated Ball-Strike System ABS challenge system is currently being tested across Minor League Baseball, including the International League.

== Teams ==
Division	Team	Founded	MLB affiliation	Affiliated	City	Stadium	Capacity
East	Buffalo Bisons	1979	Toronto Blue Jays	2013	Buffalo, New York	Sahlen Field	16,600
East	Charlotte Knights	1976	Chicago White Sox	1999	Charlotte, North Carolina	Truist Field	10,200
East	Durham Bulls	1902	Tampa Bay Rays	1998	Durham, North Carolina	Durham Bulls Athletic Park	10,000
East	Jacksonville Jumbo Shrimp	1962	Miami Marlins	2021	Jacksonville, Florida	VyStar Ballpark	11,000
East	Lehigh Valley IronPigs	2008	Philadelphia Phillies	2007	Allentown, Pennsylvania	Coca-Cola Park	10,100
East	Norfolk Tides	1961	Baltimore Orioles	2007	Norfolk, Virginia	Harbor Park	11,856
East	Rochester Red Wings	1899	Washington Nationals	2021	Rochester, New York	Innovative Field	10,840
East	Scranton/Wilkes-Barre RailRiders	1989	New York Yankees	2007	Moosic, Pennsylvania	PNC Field	10,000
East	Syracuse Mets	1934	New York Mets	2019	Syracuse, New York	NBT Bank Stadium	10,815
East	Worcester Red Sox	2021	Boston Red Sox	2021	Worcester, Massachusetts	Polar Park	9,508
West	Columbus Clippers	1977	Cleveland Guardians	2009	Columbus, Ohio	Huntington Park	10,100
West	Gwinnett Stripers	2009	Atlanta Braves	2009	Lawrenceville, Georgia	Coolray Field	10,427
West	Indianapolis Indians	1902	Pittsburgh Pirates	2005	Indianapolis, Indiana	Victory Field	13,750
West	Iowa Cubs	1969	Chicago Cubs	1981	Des Moines, Iowa	Principal Park	11,500
West	Louisville Bats	1982	Cincinnati Reds	2000	Louisville, Kentucky	Louisville Slugger Field	13,131
West	Memphis Redbirds	1998	St. Louis Cardinals	1998	Memphis, Tennessee	AutoZone Park	10,000
West	Nashville Sounds	1978	Milwaukee Brewers	2021	Nashville, Tennessee	First Horizon Park	10,000
West	Omaha Storm Chasers	1969	Kansas City Royals	1969	Papillion, Nebraska	Werner Park	9,023
West	St. Paul Saints	1993	Minnesota Twins	2021	Saint Paul, Minnesota	CHS Field	7,210
West	Toledo Mud Hens	1965	Detroit Tigers	1987	Toledo, Ohio	Fifth Third Field	10,300

== Standings ==
=== West ===
West	W	L	PCT	HOME	AWAY
Indianapolis Indians (PIT)	87	62	.584	50–25	37–37
Nashville Sounds (MIL)	85	63	.574	45–29	40–34
Toledo Mud Hens (DET)	84	66	.560	42–33	42–33
Memphis Redbirds (STL)	80	68	.541	37–36	43–32
Iowa Cubs (CHC)	74	75	.497	38–37	36–38
Louisville Bats (CIN)	71	79	.473	41–33	30–46
Columbus Clippers (CLE)	64	81	.441	34–37	30–44
Gwinnett Stripers (ATL)	63	87	.420	36–39	27–48
Omaha Storm Chasers (KC)	62	86	.419	31–43	31–43
St. Paul Saints (MIN)	62	86	.419	36–38	19–38

=== East ===
East	W	L	PCT	HOME	AWAY
y- Jacksonville Jumbo Shrimp (MIA)	89	61	.593	44–30	45–31
x- Scranton/Wilkes-Barre RailRiders (NYY)	87	60	.592	44–29	43–31
Lehigh Valley IronPigs (PHI)	87	61	.588	45–29	42–32
Durham Bulls (TB)	85	64	.570	43–32	42–32
Syracuse Mets (NYM)	77	73	.513	37–38	40–35
Worcester Red Sox (BOS)	76	73	.510	40–34	36–39
Charlotte Knights (CWS)	65	85	.433	34–42	31–43
Norfolk Tides (BAL)	63	84	.429	29–44	34–40
Buffalo Bisons (TOR)	61	85	.418	35–40	26–45
Rochester Red Wings (WSH)	59	88	.401	28–47	31–41

y- Won first half title
x- Won second half title
