= Central League (1888) =

The Central League was a professional baseball league that played for one season, 1888. The teams that played in the league were the Allentown Peanuts, Binghamton Crickets, Hazleton Pugilists, Jersey City Skeeters, Newark Trunkmakers, Scranton Miners and Wilkes-Barre Barons. The league champion was the Newark Trunkmakers, who went 83–23. The league's president was John W. Collins.

== Standings & statistics ==
1888 team standings	W	L	PCT	GB	Managers
Newark Trunkmakers	83	23	.783	-	Chris Meisel
Jersey City Skeeters	84	25	.771	½	Pat Powers
Wilkes-Barre Barons	59	48	.551	24½	James Donnelly / John Irwin
Scranton Miners	55	51	.519	28	Sam Crane
Allentown Peanuts	51	57	.472	33	Fergy Malone / Charles Reuter
Easton	38	67	.362	44½	L.F. Abbott / John Henry; Henry Putnam
Elmira	34	73	.318	49½	Charlie Hall
Hazleton Pugilists	7	32	.179	NA	Charles Gessner
Binghamton Crickets	15	50	.231	NA	Leonard Baldwin / John Lavin

Binghamton disbanded August 3; Hazleton entered the league August 9

Player statistics
Player	Team	Stat	Tot	Player	Team	Stat	Tot
John Crogan	Newark	BA	.335	Bill Daley	Jersey City	W	42
John Crogan	Newark	Runs	116	Harry Pyle	Jersey City	PCT	.818 18-4
John Crogan	Newark	Hits	158				
Jimmy Knowles	Jersey City	HR	4				
John McKee	Wilkes-Barre	SB	112				
