= Johnny Lavin =

American baseball player (1856–1893)

- Outfielder
- Born: John Lavin; 1856; Troy, New York, U.S.
- Died: December 7, 1893 (aged 36–37); Troy, New York, U.S.
- Batted: Unknown Threw: Unknown

MLB debut
- September 10, 1884, for the St. Louis Browns

Last MLB appearance
- October 15, 1884, for the St. Louis Browns

MLB statistics
- Batting average: .212
- Home runs: 0
- Runs scored: 9
- Stats at Baseball Reference

Teams
- St. Louis Browns (1884)

John Lavin (1856 – December 7, 1893) was a 19th-century American professional baseball player.
