= World Professional Jiu-Jitsu Cup 2011 =

Brazilian Jiu-Jitsu competitions

World Professional Jiu-Jitsu Championship (WPJJC)
- Current event or competition: World Professional Jiu-Jitsu Championship 2011

Competition details
- Competition date(s): April 8–9, 2011 - No-Gi Tournament; April 14–16, 2011 Gi Tournament
- Location: Abu Dhabi, U.A.E.
- English name: World Professional Jiu-Jitsu Championship
- Nickname(s): World Pro Jiu-Jitsu Cup, World Pro BJJ, Abu Dhabi Pro
- Discipline: Brazilian Jiu-Jitsu, grappling
- Type: Trials + Open
- Organiser: Carlos "Carlão" Santos
- Director(s): Sheikh Mohammed bin Zayed bin Sultan Al Nahyan

History
- First edition: May 1st and 2nd, 2009 in Abu Dhabi, U.A.E.
- First winner: (Brazil) Tarsis Humphreys (Men's Absolute, 2009)
- Most recent: (Brazil) Rodolfo Vieira (Men's absolute, 2011)

World Professional Jiu-Jitsu Cup 2011 is a third annual installment of the largest Brazilian Jiu-Jitsu event in the world, with combined prize fund of one million US dollars.

== Format and prizes ==
=== Gi divisions ===
==== Men’s brown/black belt ====
- Absolute – $30,000 to first / $3,000 to second / $1,500 to thirds
- Weight groups – $8,000 to first / $3,000 to second / $1,500 to thirds

==== Female purple/brown/black belt ====
- No absolute
- Weight divisions – $4,000 to first / $2,000 to second / $500 to thirds

==== Female white/blue belt ====
- $3,000 to first / $1,500 to second

=== New no-gi division ===
No female no-gi category.

==== Men’s Brown/black belt ====
- Absolute – $15,000 to first place / $1,500 to second / $750 to both third places
- Weight division – $4,000 to first / $1,500 to second / $750 to both thirds

==== Men’s purple belt ====
- $2,500 to first / $1,000 to second (no reward for thirds)

==== Men’s blue belt ====
- $1,500 to first / $750 to second (no reward for thirds)

== New ranking system ==
The athletes will be ranked according to their participation at various stages of the World Professional Jiu-Jitsu Cup since 2009. The first four athletes in the ranking will go straight to the quarterfinals of the main event, while the fifth-to eighth-place competitors will go straight into the round of eight. Submissions will count for more points in the ranking, and at the end of the season, an extra 5,000 points will be rewarded the first-ranked athlete, 3,000 points to the second and 2,000 points to the third. In the coming years title-defenses will be held during the tryouts (champion versus first-ranked). The athletes are ranked as follows:

=== Main event rankings ===
==== Absolute ====
- 40 pts – 1st place
- 20 pts – 2nd place
- 8 pts – 3rd place

==== Weight divisions ====
- 20 pts – 1st
- 10 pts – 2nd
- 4 pts – 3rd

=== Trials rankings ===
==== Absolute ====
- 20 pts – 1st
- 10 pts – 2nd
- 4 pts – 3rd

==== Weight groups ====
- 10 pts – 1st
- 5 pts – 2nd
- 2 pts – 3rd

== Trials ==
=== Geo zones ===
- 5 stars: Brazil, USA, Canada, Australia, Japan, United Kingdom, Portugal, and Sweden
- 4 stars: New Zealand, Poland and South Africa
- 3 stars: Korea, China, Jordan and Bahrain

=== Schedule ===
As of October 2010, the trials are scheduled take place as follows:

Trials Schedule
Where	When
Korea – Bucheon	2010-10-24
Brazil – Natal	2010-11-06
New Zealand - Auckland	2010-11-13
Sweden – Stockholm	2010-11-20
USA – New Jersey	2011-02-05
USA – Las Vegas	2011-03-05
USA – West Palm Beach	2011-02-26
South Africa – Johannesburg	2010-12-11
China - Shanghai	2010-12-18
Portugal - Lisbon	2010-12-11
Brazil – Rio de Janeiro	2011-01-22
Brazil- Gramado	2011-02-05
Poland – Warsaw	2011-02-12
Australia – Sydney	2011-02-19
Canada – Montreal	2011-02-26
Japan – Tokyo	2011-03-12
United Kingdom – London	2011-03-26
Bahrain – Manama	2011-04-02
Jordan - Amman	2010-11-26

=== Weight divisions in trials ===
- 5 stars
  - White/Blue Belts: -62 kg, -68 kg, -74 kg, -80 kg, -86 kg, -92 kg, +92 kg, Open Weights (Light -74 kg and Heavy +74 kg)
  - Purple Belt: -65 kg, -74 kg, -83 kg, -92 kg, +92 kg, Open Weight (Light -74 kg, Heavy +74 kg)
  - Brown/Black Belt: -65 kg, -74 kg, -83 kg, -92 kg, +92 kg, Open Weight
  - Female White/Blue Belts: -63 kg, +63 kg
  - Female Purple/Brown/Black Belts: -63 kg, +63 kg
- 4 stars
  - White/Blue Belts: -62 kg, -68 kg, -74 kg, -80 kg, -86 kg, -92 kg, +92 kg, Open Weights (Light -74 kg and Heavy +74 kg)
  - Purple Belt: -65 kg, -74 kg, -83 kg, -92 kg, +92 kg, Open Weight (Light -74 kg, Heavy +74 kg)
  - Brown/Black Belt: -65 kg, -74 kg, -83 kg, -92 kg, +92 kg, Open Weight
  - Female White/Blue/Purple/Brown/Black Belts: -63 kg, +63 kg
- 3 stars
  - White/Blue Belts: -62 kg, -68 kg, -74 kg, -80 kg, -86 kg, -92 kg, +92 kg, Open Weights (Light -74 kg and Heavy +74 kg)
  - Purple Belt: -65 kg, -74 kg, -83 kg, -92 kg, +92 kg, Open Weight (Light -74 kg, Heavy +74 kg)

=== Prizes ===
Winners of the trials will receive all-expense-paid trips to the main event to Abu Dhabi. Gold and silver medalists of the black belt absolute divisions will receive additional $4,000 and $1,000 respectively. The organizers calculated that the total amount paid out for the main event, qualifiers, and travel package prizes will be one million US dollars. The actual total cash amount distributed will be AED 1,000,000 or US$272,000. This is largest amount to be awarded in a Jiu-Jitsu tournament ever.

== Main event ==
The main event is open not only to those who qualify at the trials. Any competitor who can afford to be in Abu Dhabi on the following dates can enter to compete at the main event:

- April 8 and 9, 2011 - No-Gi Tournament
- April 14, 15 and 16, 2011 Gi Tournament.
