= Eastern League (1884–1887) =

Defunct American professional baseball league

The Eastern League of Professional Base Ball Clubs (1884–1887), was a professional baseball association of teams in the Northeastern United States. The league was founded in January 1884 when the Union League of Professional Base Ball Clubs added four teams and dissolved to reform as the Eastern League. In 1887, the first Eastern League was absorbed into the International League.

== History ==
=== Establishment ===
On January 4, 1884, representatives of the Union League of Professional Base Ball Clubs met in Philadelphia to discuss affairs of their organization in the coming year. Delegates were on hand representing ball clubs located in Baltimore, Richmond, Virginia, Wilmington, Delaware, and Reading, Pennsylvania. Observers were also present from established teams outside the league, including the Philadelphia Athletics, the New York Metropolitans, and the Buffalo Bisons.

New clubs were admitted to the league for the coming year located in Newark and Trenton, New Jersey and Harrisburg and Allentown, Pennsylvania, bringing the total number of teams for the Eastern League at the time of its founding to eight. A bid was made by a representative of a team located in Lancaster, Pennsylvania, but the request for admission was declined.

On the second day of their gathering the assembled representatives voted to change the name of their league to the Eastern League of Professional Base Ball Clubs. According to one newspaper account of the day, the decision to change the league's name was related to a desire to avoid confusion with the rival Union Association of Base Ball Clubs. The formation of the new league effectively put an end not only to the Union League from whence it sprung, but also tolled the death knell of the short-lived Inter-State Professional Base-Ball Association, which had included teams from Allentown, Harrisburg, Reading, Trenton, and Wilmington.

The Eastern League played baseball according to the rules of the American Association, with only minor modifications. Rules changes unique to the Eastern League included a provision that batters must run after receiving three strikes or seven balls. The completion of five full innings was deemed sufficient for a complete game to have been played in the event of darkness or rain. In a change from past practice, teams were also required to remove "all obnoxious persons from the grounds in the space of fifteen minutes" under penalty of forfeiture of the game.

The inaugural season was to run from May 1 to October 1, 1884. Each team in the association to play a 98-game season in which every team was to play each other a total of 14 times during the year.

Four regular and two substitute umpires were to be provided by the league, sufficient to handle the 8-team league's possible four daily match ups; in the event of absence of an official umpire, the visiting team was to name the replacement, subject to that individual's not being associated with the visiting club himself.

=== Governance ===
The Eastern League was to be governed by a 7-member executive, consisting of a President, Vice President, Secretary and Treasurer, and a four-member board of directors, all to be elected at the annual meeting of teams. President of the league in 1884 was W.C. Seddon of Richmond, Virginia.

The Eastern League was to be governed by annual meetings to be held each year in Philadelphia on the second Wednesday of January. Annual dues were $100 per club, with $500 of this amount going to pay the salary of the league's permanent Secretary.

The Eastern League was anxious to become signatories to the so-called tripartite national agreement between the National League, American Association, and the Northwestern League which governed mutual respect of player contracts and other matters. To this end, a meeting of the three signatories to the national agreement was called for May 5, 1884 to ratify the Eastern League's request. The Union Association of Base Ball Clubs stood in opposition to this agreement and was a bitter rival in the battle for organizational hegemony.

== 1884 teams ==
The following teams were slated to play in the Eastern League as of January 1884. Monumental Club of Baltimore and Quickstep Club of Wilmington ended up playing in the short-lived Union Association instead, the latter as a late-season replacement team after starting the year in the Eastern League.

- Active Club — Reading, Pennsylvania
- Allentown Club — Allentown, Pennsylvania
- Domestic Club — Newark, New Jersey
- Harrisburg Club — Harrisburg, Pennsylvania
- Monumental Club — Baltimore, Maryland
- Quickstep Club — Wilmington, Delaware
- Trenton Club — Trenton, New Jersey
- Virginia Club — Richmond, Virginia
