= Trenton Trentonians =

Former Minor League Baseball team in Trenton, New Jersey

- 1883–1885; Trenton, New Jersey

Minor league affiliations
- Class: Unclassified (1883–1885)
- League: Eastern League (1884–1885); Interstate Association (1883)

Minor league titles
- Pennants (1): 1884

Team data
- Name: Trenton Trentonians (1883–1885)
- Ballpark: East State Street Grounds (1884–1885); Trenton Base Ball Grounds (1883)

The Trenton Trentonians were a minor league baseball team that played in Trenton, New Jersey, from 1883 to 1885. They were members of the Interstate Association in 1883 and the Eastern League from 1884 to 1885. Their home games were played at the Trenton Base Ball Grounds in 1883 and at the East State Street Grounds from 1884 to 1885.

The 1884 Trentonians won the Eastern League pennant, the league's championship, with a season record of 46–39, which placed them four games ahead of the second-place Lancaster Ironsides.
