= Lincoln Park (Jersey City) =

Urban park in Jersey City, New Jersey

- West Side Park (1905–1930)
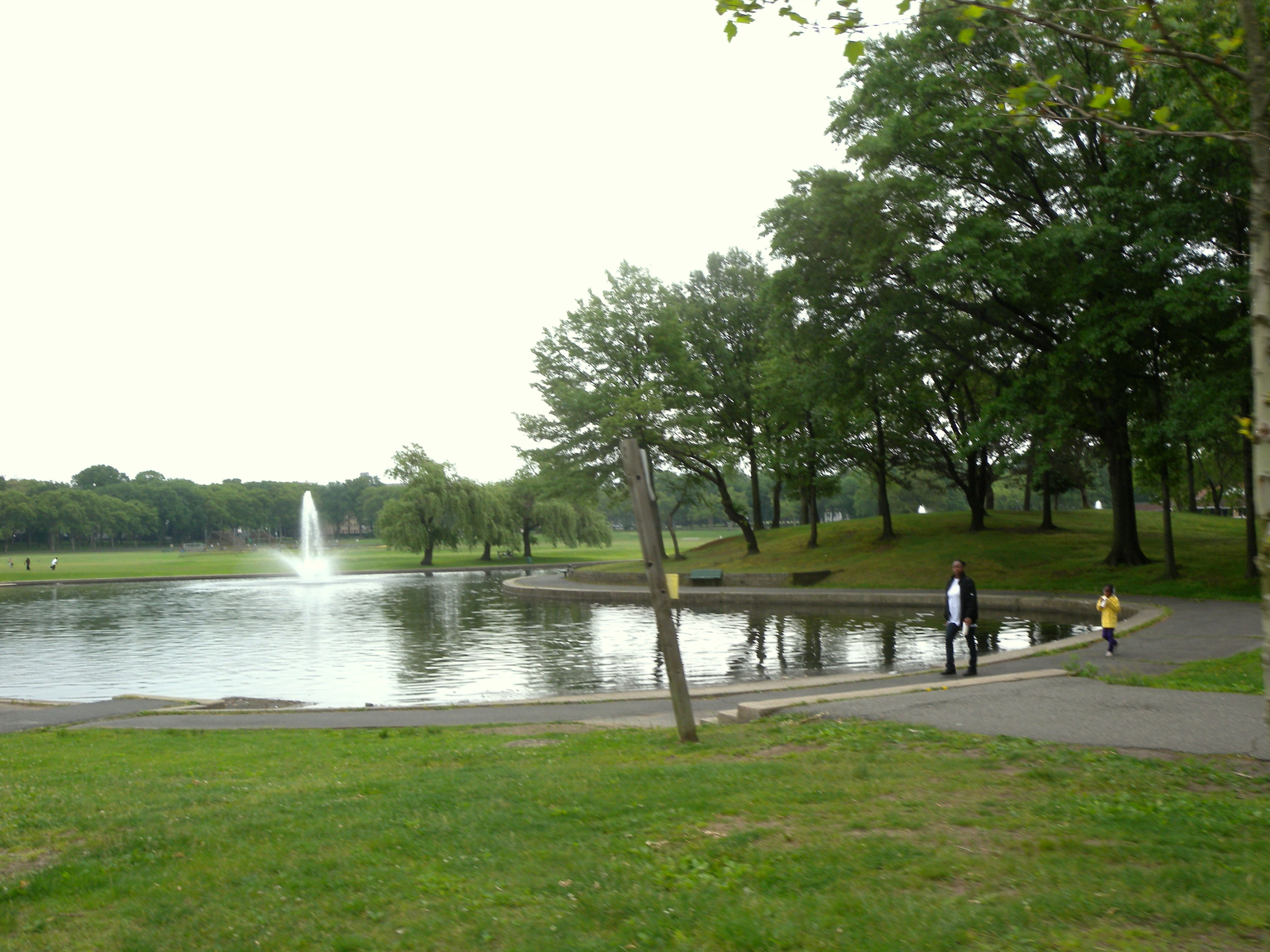
- Lincoln Park Lake
- Interactive map of Lincoln Park
- Type: Urban park
- Location: Jersey City, New Jersey
- Coordinates: 40.724640°N 74.080939°W
- Area: 273.4 acres (110.6 ha)
- Created: 1905
- Operator: Hudson County, New Jersey

Lincoln Park is an urban park in Jersey City, New Jersey with an area of 273.4 acres (110.6 ha). Part of the Hudson County Park System, it opened in 1905 and was originally known as West Side Park. The park was designed by Daniel W. Langton and Charles N. Lowrie, both founding members of the American Society of Landscape Architects and part of the City Beautiful movement.

The park consists of two distinct sections: Lincoln Park East, 150.4 acres (60.9 ha), and Lincoln Park West, 123 acres (50 ha). The sections are named for their positions relative to U.S. Route 1/9 Truck, which passes between them, and are connected by foot and vehicular bridges over the highway. The Lincoln Park Nature Walk is part of wetlands restoration project adjacent to the Hackensack River. The Hackensack RiverWalk is a partially completed greenway along the banks of the river running the length of the Hudson County shoreline. The East Coast Greenway also traverses the park.

== History ==
Lincoln Park was the first park in the Hudson County parks system. The Hudson County Parks Commission was created in 1903, and began work on the park in 1904. The park was built primarily on undeveloped swamp and the privately owned Glendale Woods. By 1925, 85 acres (34 ha) of land had been reclaimed from the Hackensack River in the western portion of the park. The park was expanded again in 1938 with the acquisition of additional properties along the Hackensack River. The Lincoln Park Nature Walk is part of 31-acre (130,000 m^{2}) wetlands restoration project on a former landfill site adjacent to the Hackensack River unveiled in July 2011. It is hoped that the nearly $10.6 million development will enhance bird and fish populations. A section of the East Coast Greenway crosses through the park, which is site of one of five kiosks in the state for the project

A ballpark within the grounds was the home of the Jersey City Skeeters of the Eastern League from 1902 through 1905.

== Facilities ==
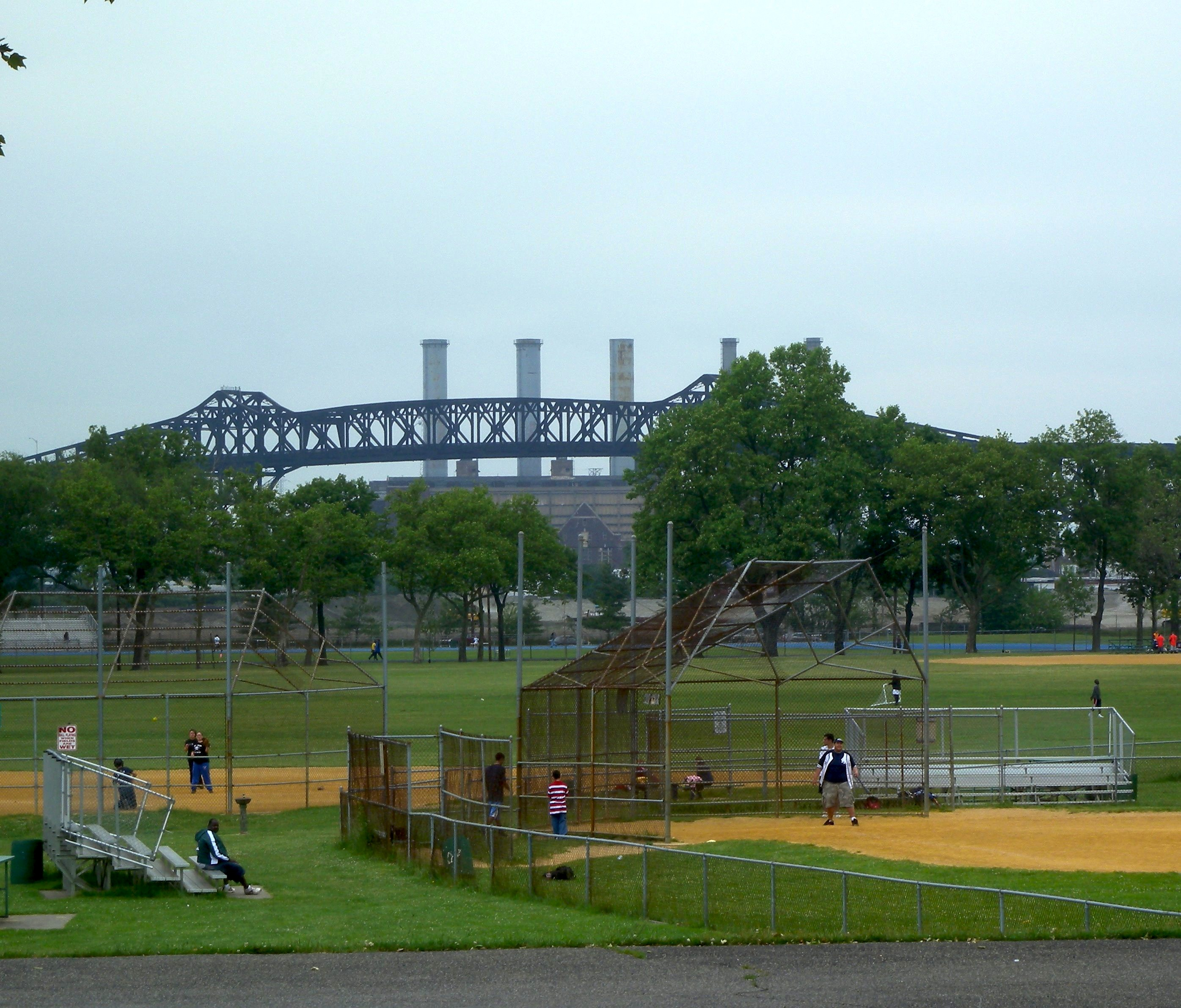
Three of the baseball fields, with Pulaski Skyway and smokestacks of the Kearny Generating Station in background

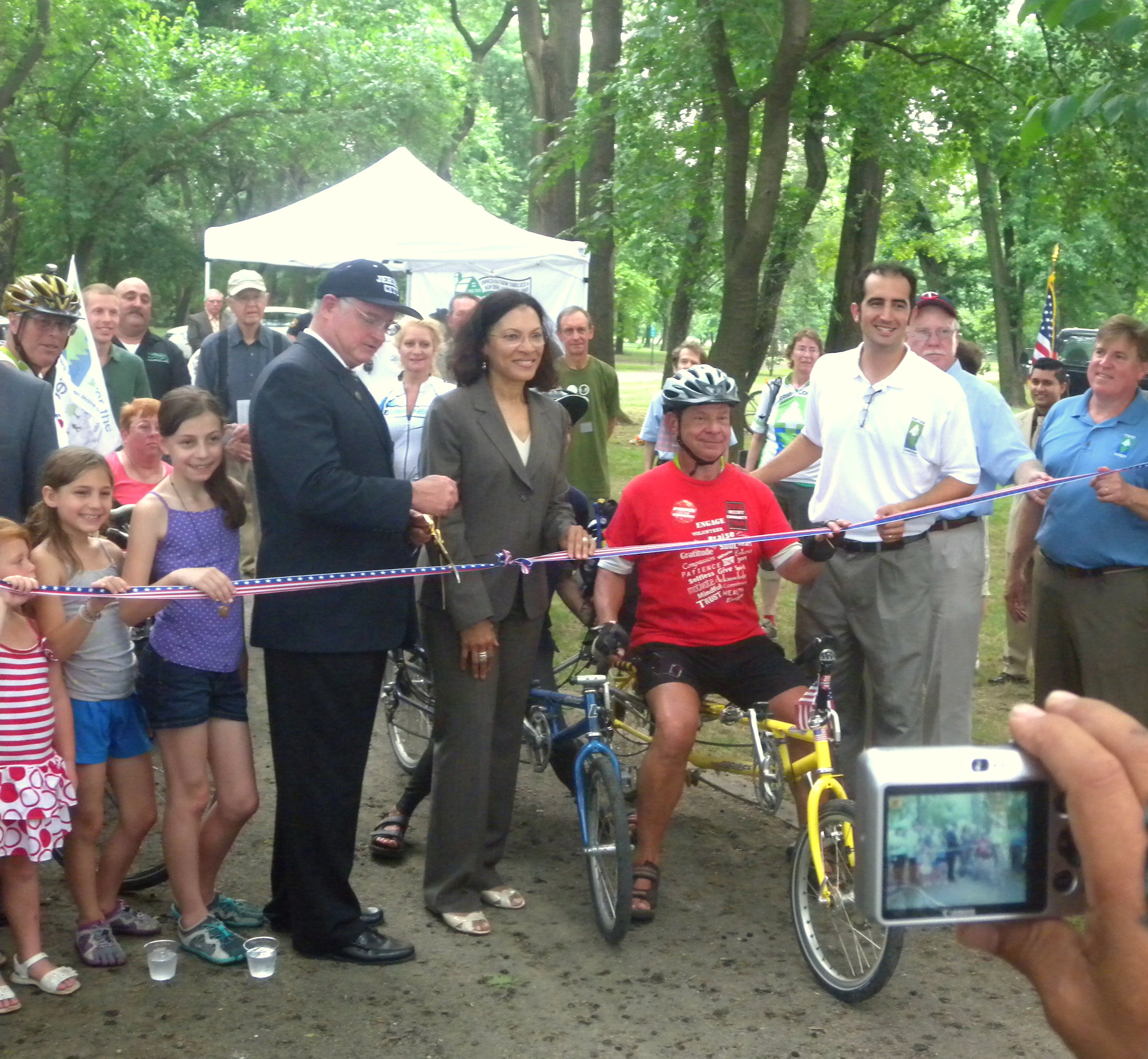
Ceremonial opening of East Coast Greenway segment in the park

=== Athletics and recreation ===
Lincoln Park East contains many sports fields and recreational facilities. There are 21 outdoor tennis courts, seven baseball fields, a cricket pitch, three children's playgrounds, the Charlie Mays running track, five basketball courts, two football fields, two soccer fields, and four handball/paddleball courts. This section of the park also contains a 3 acres (1.2 ha) lake available for fishing. The lake has also been used for model yacht racing. In 2009, a suspected virus resulted in a large number of carp dying in the lake.

Lincoln Park West features wetlands with hiking trails and Joseph J. Jaroschak Field, the facility for the baseball, softball, and men's and women's soccer teams of Saint Peter's University. The field was opened and dedicated in 1990 by Mary Lou Jaroschak, and named after her late husband.

In 2011, construction began on a nine-hole public golf course in Lincoln Park West, the first public course in Hudson County. Skyway Golf Course, named after the Pulaski Skyway, opened in May 2015 after environmental restoration, grading, and landscaping. Previously, the golf course was the location of a batting cages and a driving range.

New York Road Runners hosts a weekly 2.7-mile Open Run.

=== Structures and buildings ===
Lincoln Park East has four gazebos, several maintenance buildings, and the Park Administration Building. The Administration Building houses offices as well as the Hank Gallo Community Room.

=== Casino in the Park ===
Just south of the Lincoln Park Lake is Casino in the Park, a catering facility owned by the county and leased to a private operator. The original structure was built as a clubhouse for the tennis courts, but was underutilized due to the distance between them. It was used as a summer museum by the Jersey City Public Library before being leased to Ray Dillman, manager of the El Morocco nightclub in New York City, as a restaurant.

The restaurant is regularly used for meetings and events. Many well known people have attended private and public events at the venue. In 1963, Frank Sinatra attended his parents' 50th wedding anniversary celebration at Casino in the Park alongside his daughter and Rat Pack "Clan". In 1991, the Hudson County Democratic Organization was addressed by then Arkansas Governor Bill Clinton. It was also the location of weekly meetings of the Rotary Club of Jersey City.

The city leases the building to a private enterprise.

The original building was demolished in April 2020 and a replacement called "The View at Lincoln Park" is set to be completed in September 2022.

== Former facilities ==
Skeeters Park was a minor league baseball field with bleachers and a grandstand with a seating capacity of 8,500 people, built in 1902. It was home to the Jersey City Skeeters, a minor league baseball team from 1902 to 1905.

A nine-hole golf course was built on 140 acres (57 ha) of the western portion of the park in 1925. The park also had a concrete swimming pool 40 by 130 feet (12 by 40 m) near the athletic fields.

== Art ==
Lincoln the Mystic at eastern entrance

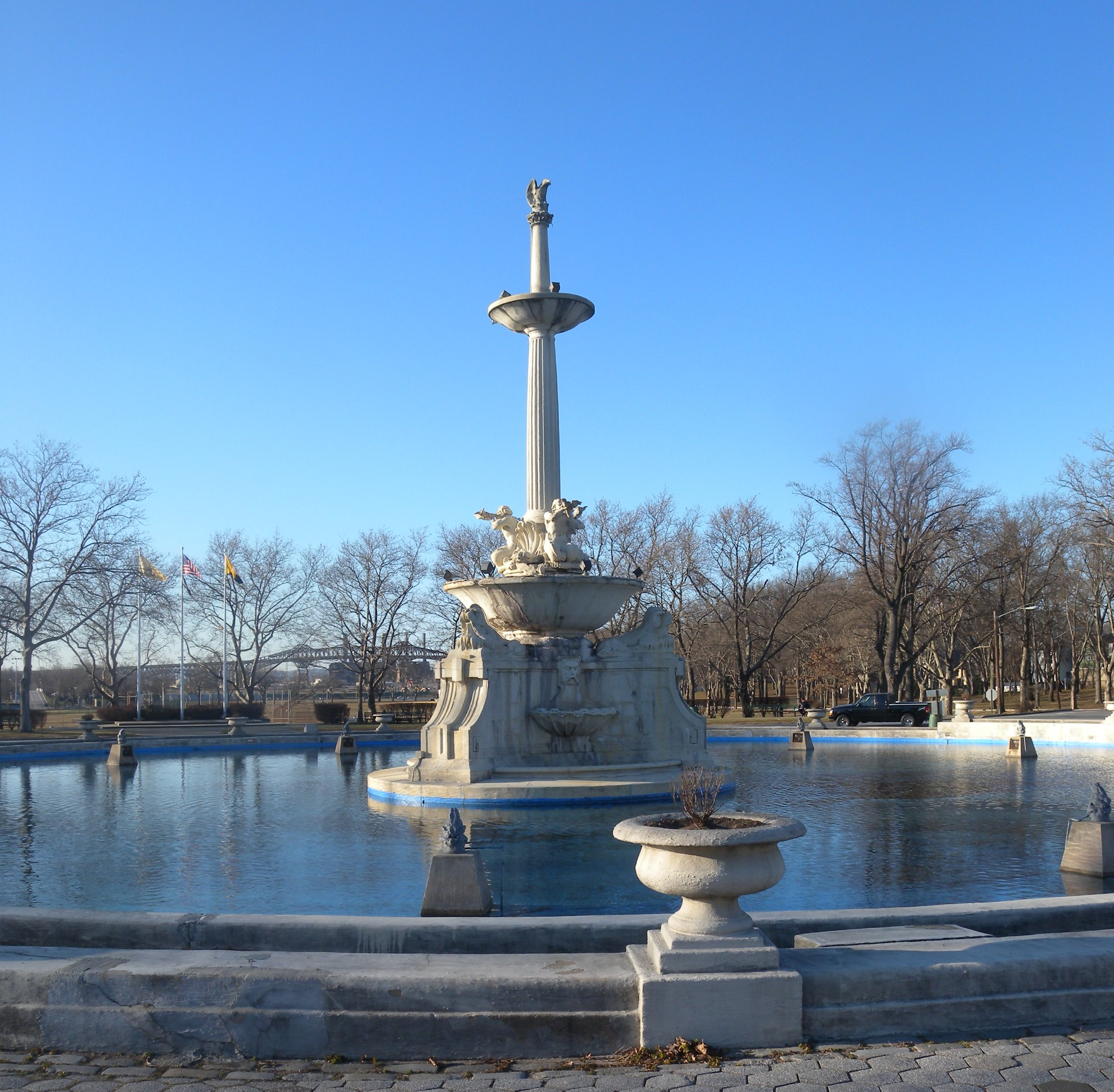
Lincoln Park Fountain

The primary piece of public art in the park is Lincoln the Mystic, a statue by James Earle Fraser commissioned in 1929 by the Lincoln Association of Jersey City. The sculpture was dedicated on June 14, 1930. 4,000 people attended the unveiling and the crowd was addressed by New Jersey Governor Morgan F. Larson.

The park is also home to the world's largest concrete monument, the 365-ton Lincoln Park Fountain designed by Pierre J. Cheron at the center of the park's traffic circle. The fountain is 53 feet (16 m) tall, and contains 27 frog-shaped spouts and 150 lights. The fountain was rededicated on June 16, 2016, after a $7.2 million restoration.

The park also contains several monuments and memorials:

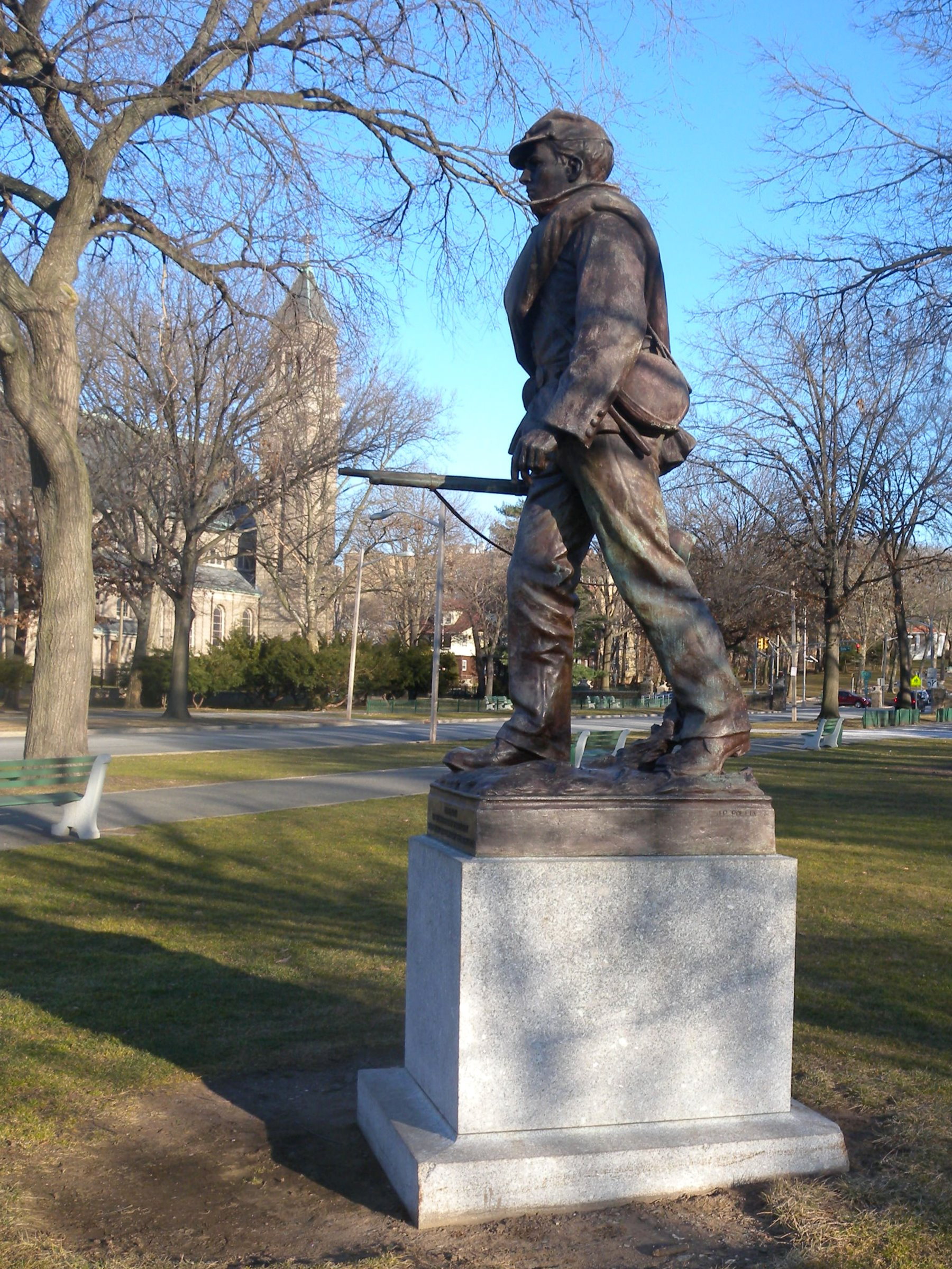
Civil War memorial

- The Jersey City Civil War Memorial was dedicated on May 28, 1926. The bronze sculpture is 9 feet (2.7 m) tall and depicts a marching Civil War soldier dressed in a full uniform. Originally intended to be placed in Hamilton Park, the memorial was installed by the executor of the estate of Edward J. Donnelly, Sergeant, Company C, 5th New Jersey Volunteer Infantry.

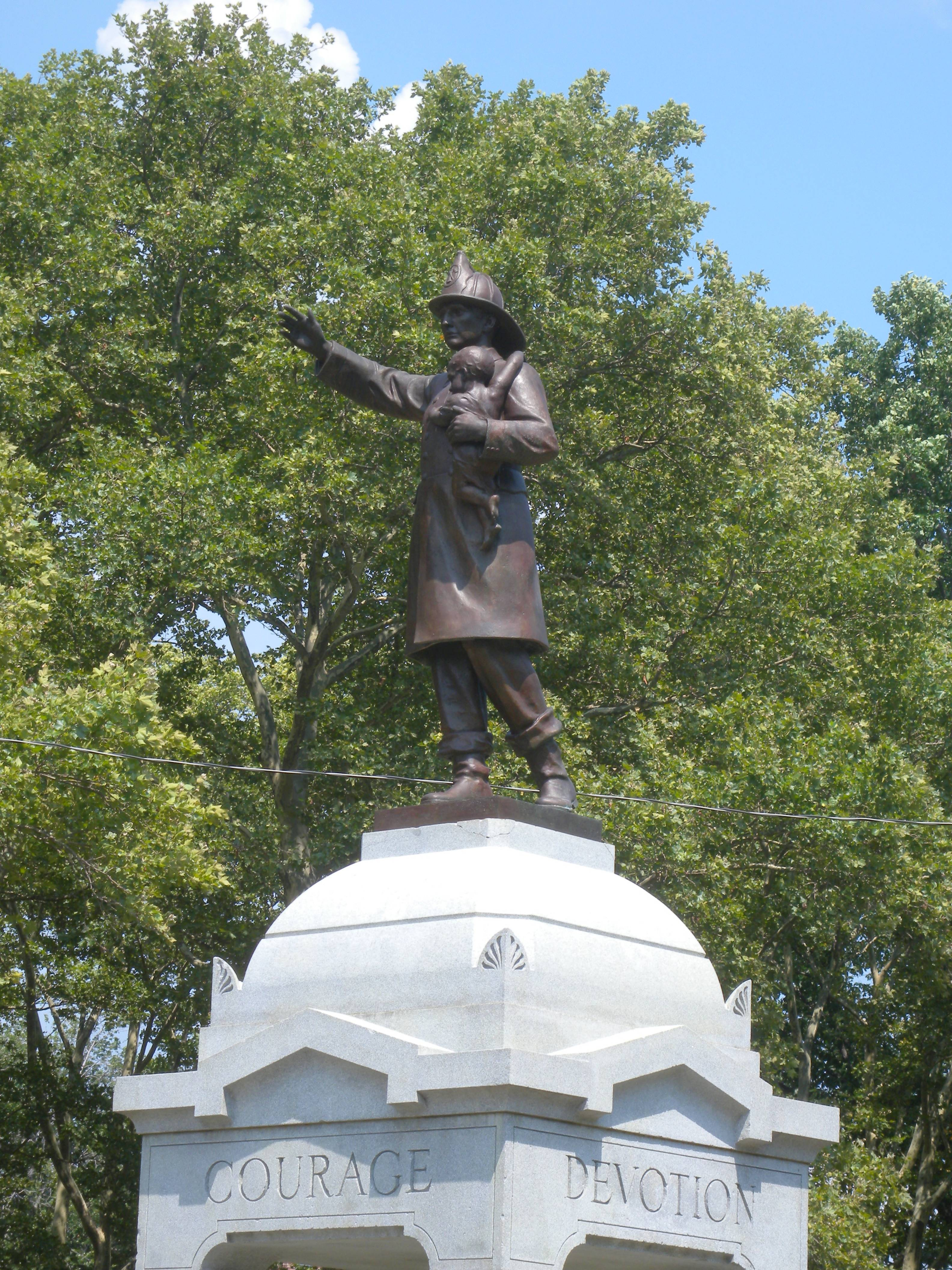
Detail of the Farrier Memorial

- The Farrier Memorial, a 6-foot (1.8 m) bronze statue of a firefighter atop a domed granite base of 15 feet (4.6 m), was a bequest by Police Captain Frederick T. Farrier to honor the Volunteer Fire Department and was dedicated on November 21, 1931.
- The Great Irish Famine Memorial, erected by the Friendly Sons of St. Patrick, is a Celtic cross of 18 feet (5.5 m) and was dedicated on May 8, 2011.

== In popular culture ==
- In the pilot episode of the HBO crime drama The Sopranos, the former driving range at Lincoln Park West, near the Pulaski Skyway, featured in a scene.

Lincoln park is also featured in the HBO miniseries The Plot Against America where actor Johnathon Tuturo can be seen riding a horse by the fountain circle
