= International League =

American professional baseball league

- Current season, competition or edition: 2025 International League season
- Classification: Triple-A (1946–present); Double-A (1912–1945); Class A (1902–1911)
- Sport: Baseball
- Founded: 1884 (142 years ago)
- No. of teams: 20
- Country: United States
- Most recent champion: Rochester Red Wings (2026)
- Most titles: Rochester Red Wings (20)
- Broadcasters: MiLB.TV, MLB Network, and local sports networks
- Website: www.milb.com

The International League (IL) is a Minor League Baseball league that operates in the United States. Along with the Pacific Coast League, it is one of two leagues playing at the Triple-A level, which is one grade below Major League Baseball (MLB).

The league traces its roots to 1884, while the modern IL began in 1912. Following MLB's reorganization of the minor leagues in 2021, it operated as the Triple-A East for one season before switching back to its previous moniker in 2022. It is so named because throughout much of its history the International League had teams in Canada and Cuba as well as those in the United States. Since 2008, however, all of its teams have been based in the US. The IL's 20 teams are located in 14 states stretching from Papillion, Nebraska, to Worcester, Massachusetts, and from St. Paul, Minnesota, to Jacksonville, Florida.

A league champion is determined at the end of each season. The Rochester Red Wings have won 20 International League titles, the most in the league's history, followed by the Columbus Clippers (11) and the Baltimore Orioles, original Buffalo Bisons, and Toronto Maple Leafs (10). During the era of the Governors' Cup playoffs from 1933 to 2020, the most cup titles were won by Columbus (11), followed by Rochester (10) and the Syracuse Mets (8).

== History ==
The International League was created from the mergers of member teams from three precursor leagues: the Eastern League of 1884, which was itself a re-organization of the Interstate Association of 1883; the New York State League, formed in 1885; and the Ontario League, also organized in 1885. The New York State League and Ontario League merged in 1886 to form the International League, and in 1887 the Eastern League was absorbed to create a ten-club league. Also in 1887, the International League passed a resolution barring African Americans from playing in the league. The league collapsed soon afterwards, when the northern teams claimed that it was too onerous to travel to the south and formed the International Association.

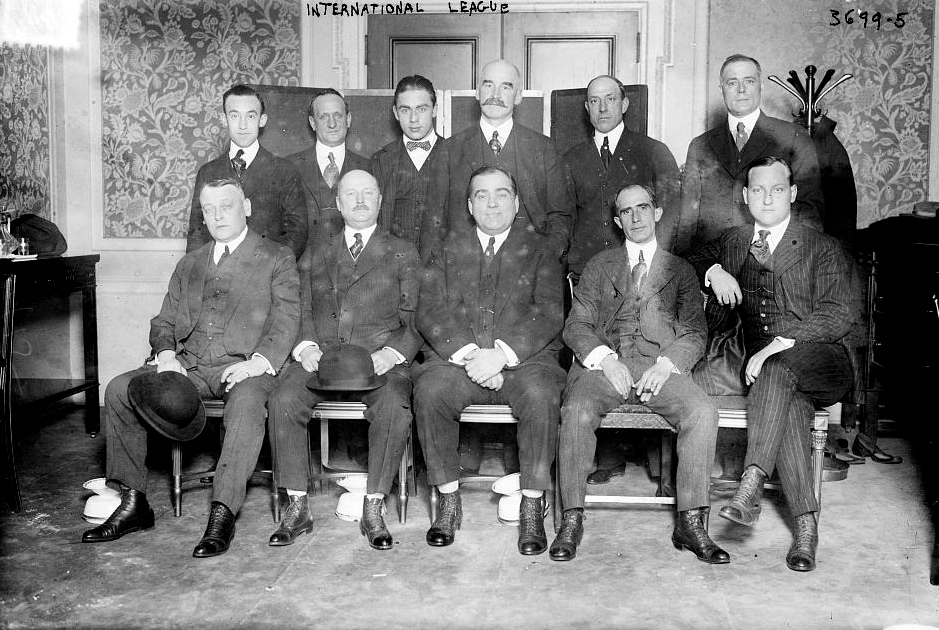
International League baseball executives in 1915

The "International League" name was first used in 1886, but did not become the longterm name of the league until 1912. The league ultimately cited 1884 as the year of its foundation, through the following lineage:

- 1884: Eastern League
- 1885: New York State League
- 1886–1887: International League
- 1888–1890: International Association
- 1891: Eastern Association
- 1892–1911: Eastern League
- 1912–2020: International League

The International League was also affected by the effort to establish the Federal League as a new third major league from 1914 to 1915, with franchises being added and dropped and new ballparks built. In 1954, a franchise was awarded to Havana, Cuba, but due to political upheaval in that country it had to be moved—to Jersey City, New Jersey—in the middle of the 1960 season. Another foray into the Caribbean failed when the newly created team in San Juan, Puerto Rico, added in 1961, had to be moved to Charleston, West Virginia, in mid-season.

In June 1971, an IL all-star team beat the New York Yankees, 15–13, in an exhibition game at Silver Stadium in Rochester, New York, before a crowd of 11,001—notable players on the all-star squad included Don Baylor, Carlton Fisk, and Bobby Grich. In August 1983, another team of IL all-stars were defeated by the Cleveland Indians, 8–6, in 11 innings before 11,032 fans at Franklin County Stadium in Columbus, Ohio.

The International League and the American Association, another Triple-A league that operated in the Midwest, voted in 1988 to play interleague games as part of the Triple-A Alliance. The league also split into two divisions that year. The interleague concept ended in 1992, but the two league divisions remained.

In 1998, the International League reorganized into three divisions with the addition of four new teams—the Buffalo Bisons, Indianapolis Indians, and Louisville Redbirds joined from the disbanded American Association, while the Durham Bulls joined from the Class A Carolina League.

=== 2020 season cancellation and Minor League reorganization ===
The start of the 2020 season was postponed due to the COVID-19 pandemic before ultimately being cancelled on June 30. Prior to the 2021 season, Major League Baseball (MLB) assumed direct control of Minor League Baseball in a move to increase player salaries, modernize facility standards, and reduce travel through better geographical alignment. As part of this reorganization, the International League was expanded to 20 teams and temporarily renamed the "Triple-A East" for the 2021 season. Of these 20 teams, 14 were existing members of the International League, four were the easternmost teams from the Pacific Coast League, one was promoted from the Double-A Southern League, and one moved from the independent American Association of Professional Baseball. Following MLB's acquisition of the rights to the names of the historical minor leagues, the Triple-A East was renamed the International League effective with the 2022 season.

== Structure and season ==
The International League is divided into the East Division and the West Division, each consisting of 10 teams. As of the 2022 season, all teams play a 150-game schedule, beginning in late March and concluding in late September.

=== Players ===
The International League uses a salary cap. As of the 2024 season, clubs are required to spend a maximum of US$1,610,000 on player compensation, with a minimum salary of $35,800 per player. For players aged 23 and younger on standard contracts, only 50% of their salary counts towards the cap (up to $250,000 total). There is also a separate salary cap for coaches and technical staff.

Rosters are limited to a size of 28 players on Opening Day weekend, although up to 9 players can be signed on the roster before the transactions date limit.

=== Championship and interleague play ===
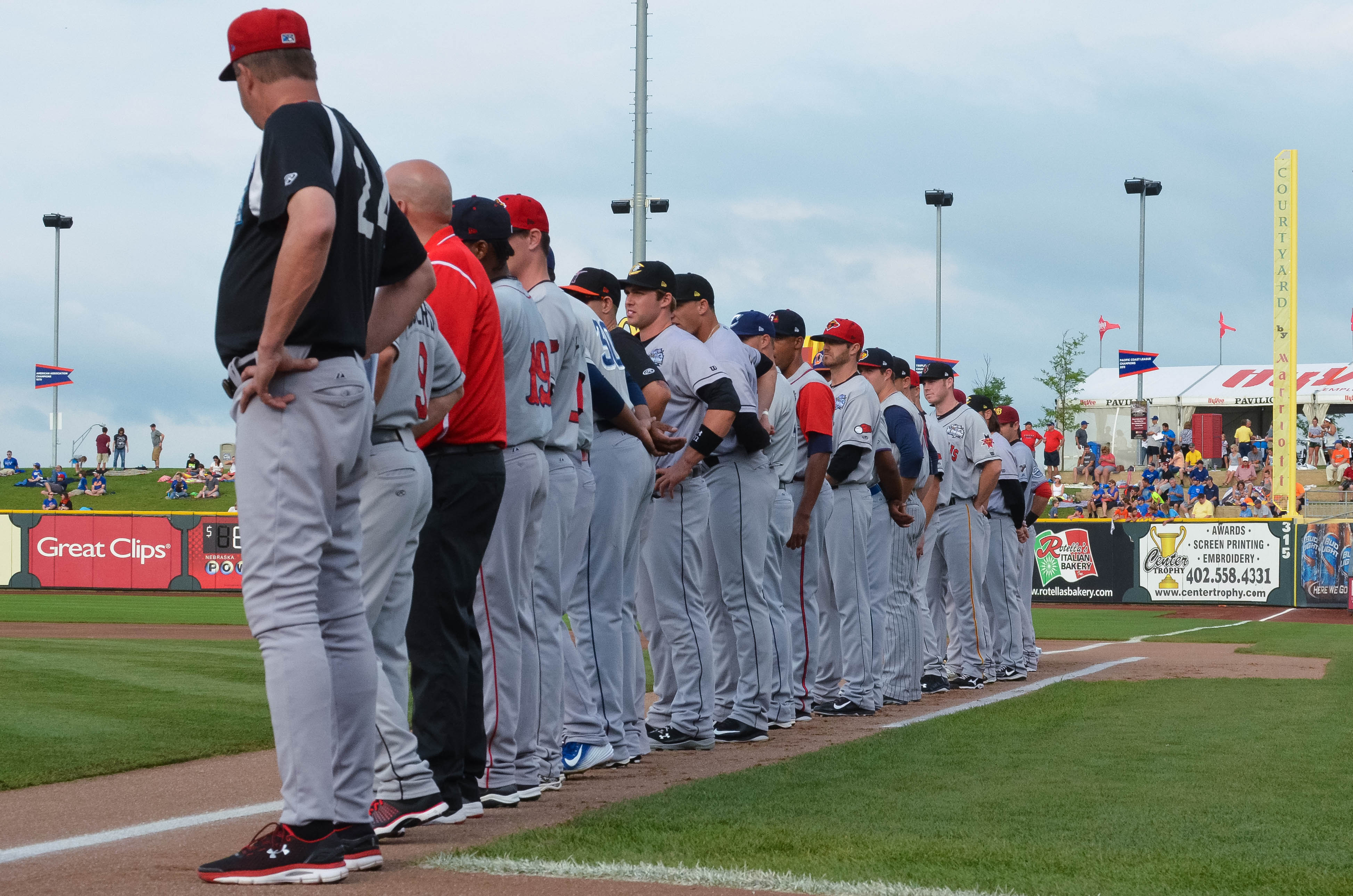
IL All-Stars at the 2015 Triple-A All-Star Game

Since the 2023 season, the regular season is split into two halves. After the completion of the season, the winners of each half meet in a best-of-three series to determine a league champion. From 1933 to 2019, the three division champions and a wild card team squared off in series playoffs to determine a champion, with the winner awarded the Governors' Cup, the league's championship trophy. Following the cancelled 2020 season, rather than hold playoffs for its championship, the 2021 title was awarded to the team with the best regular-season record. In 2022, the two division champions met in a single game to determine a league champion.

In further postseason play, the IL champion meets the Pacific Coast League's champion in the Triple-A National Championship Game, a single game to determine an overall champion of Triple-A baseball, which has been held annually since 2006, excluding 2020 and 2021. Previously, the IL champion also competed in the Triple-A World Series (1983, 1998–2000), Junior World Series (1919), and other sporadic postseason competitions throughout the league's history.

Other interleague play occurred during the Triple-A All-Star Game. Traditionally, the game had taken place on the day after the mid-summer Major League Baseball All-Star Game. The game was meant to mark a symbolic halfway-point in the season (though not the mathematical halfway-point which, for most seasons, is usually one month prior). During the All-Star break, no regular-season games were scheduled for two days before the All-Star Game itself.

== Current teams ==
Division	Team	Founded	MLB affiliation	Affiliated	City	Stadium	Capacity
East	Buffalo Bisons	1979	Toronto Blue Jays	2013	Buffalo, New York	Sahlen Field	16,600
East	Charlotte Knights	1976	Chicago White Sox	1999	Charlotte, North Carolina	Truist Field	10,200
East	Durham Bulls	1902	Tampa Bay Rays	1998	Durham, North Carolina	Durham Bulls Athletic Park	10,000
East	Jacksonville Jumbo Shrimp	1962	Miami Marlins	2021	Jacksonville, Florida	VyStar Ballpark	11,000
East	Lehigh Valley IronPigs	2008	Philadelphia Phillies	2007	Allentown, Pennsylvania	Coca-Cola Park	10,100
East	Norfolk Tides	1961	Baltimore Orioles	2007	Norfolk, Virginia	Harbor Park	11,856
East	Rochester Red Wings	1899	Washington Nationals	2021	Rochester, New York	ESL Ballpark	10,840
East	Scranton/Wilkes-Barre Highlanders	1989	New York Yankees	2007	Moosic, Pennsylvania	PNC Field	10,000
East	Syracuse Mets	1934	New York Mets	2019	Syracuse, New York	NBT Bank Stadium	10,815
East	Worcester Red Sox	2021	Boston Red Sox	2021	Worcester, Massachusetts	Polar Park	9,508
West	Columbus Clippers	1977	Cleveland Guardians	2009	Columbus, Ohio	Huntington Park	10,100
West	Gwinnett Stripers	2009	Atlanta Braves	2009	Lawrenceville, Georgia	Gwinnett Field	10,427
West	Indianapolis Indians	1902	Pittsburgh Pirates	2005	Indianapolis, Indiana	Victory Field	13,750
West	Iowa Cubs	1969	Chicago Cubs	1981	Des Moines, Iowa	Principal Park	11,500
West	Louisville Bats	1982	Cincinnati Reds	2000	Louisville, Kentucky	Louisville Slugger Field	13,131
West	Memphis Redbirds	1998	St. Louis Cardinals	1998	Memphis, Tennessee	AutoZone Park	10,000
West	Nashville Sounds	1978	Milwaukee Brewers	2021	Nashville, Tennessee	First Horizon Park	10,000
West	Omaha Storm Chasers	1969	Kansas City Royals	1969	Papillion, Nebraska	Werner Park	9,023
West	St. Paul Saints	1993	Minnesota Twins	2021	Saint Paul, Minnesota	CHS Field	7,210
West	Toledo Mud Hens	1965	Detroit Tigers	1987	Toledo, Ohio	Fifth Third Field	10,300

=== Team map ===
East Division, West Division

== League timeline ==
These teams were either charter members of the IL in 1912 or were added as expansion teams thereafter.

- Baltimore Orioles (1912–1914) → Richmond Climbers (1915–1916) → Richmond Virginians (1917)
- Buffalo Bisons (1912–1970) → Winnipeg Whips (1970–1971) → Peninsula Whips (1972–1973) → Memphis Blues (1974–1976) → Charleston Charlies (1977–1983) → Maine Guides (1984–1987) → Maine Phillies (1988) → Scranton/Wilkes-Barre Red Barons (1989–2006) → Scranton/Wilkes-Barre Yankees (2007–2012) → Scranton/Wilkes-Barre RailRiders (2013–2026) → Scranton/Wilkes-Barre Highlanders (2027–present)
- Jersey City Skeeters (1912–1915) → Newark Indians (1916) → Newark Bears (1917–1919) → Akron Buckeyes (1920) → Newark Bears (1921–1925) → Providence Grays (1925) → Newark Bears (1925–1949) → Springfield Cubs (1950–1953) → Havana Sugar Kings (1954–1960) → Jersey City Jerseys (1960–1961) → Jacksonville Suns (1962–1968) → Tidewater Tides (1969–1992) → Norfolk Tides (1993–present)
- Montreal Royals (1912–1917)
- Newark Indians (1912–1915) → Harrisburg Senators (1915)
- Providence Grays (1912–1917)
- Rochester Hustlers (1912–1920) → Rochester Colts (1921) → Rochester Tribe (1922–1927) → Rochester Red Wings (1928–present)
- Toronto Maple Leafs (1912–1967) → Louisville Colonels (1968–1972) → Pawtucket Red Sox (1973–1975) → Rhode Island Red Sox (1976) → Pawtucket Red Sox (1977–2020) → Worcester Red Sox (2021–present)
- Baltimore Orioles (1916–1953) → Richmond Virginians (1954–1964) → Toledo Mud Hens (1965–present)
- Binghamton Bingoes (1918–1919) → Syracuse Stars (1920–1927) → Montreal Royals (1928–1960) → Syracuse Chiefs (1961–1996) → Syracuse SkyChiefs (1997–2006) → Syracuse Chiefs (2007–2018) → Syracuse Mets (2019–present)
- Jersey City Skeeters (1918–1933) → Syracuse Chiefs (1934–1955) → Miami Marlins (1956–1960) → San Juan Marlins (1961) → Charleston Marlins (1961) → Atlanta Crackers (1962–1965) → Richmond Braves (1966–2008) → Gwinnett Braves (2009–2017) → Gwinnett Stripers (2018–present)
- Syracuse Stars (1918) → Hamilton Tigers (1918) → Reading Coal Barons (1919) → Reading Marines (1920) → Reading Aces (1921–1922) → Reading Keystones (1923–1932) → Albany Senators (1932–1936) → Jersey City Giants (1937–1950) → Ottawa Giants (1951) → Ottawa Athletics (1952–1954) → Columbus Jets (1955–1970) → Charleston Charlies (1971–1976) → Columbus Clippers (1977–present)
- Arkansas Travelers (1963)
- Charlotte Knights (1993–present)
- Ottawa Lynx (1993–2007) → Lehigh Valley IronPigs (2008–present)
- Durham Bulls (1998–present)

=== Former American Association teams ===
Three current teams joined the IL in 1998 from the American Association, which disbanded after the 1997 season. Indianapolis had previously played in the IL in 1963.

- Buffalo Bisons (1979–present)
- Indianapolis Indians (1902–present)
- Louisville Redbirds (1982–1998) → Louisville RiverBats (1999–2001) → Louisville Bats (2002–present)

=== Former Pacific Coast League teams ===
Four current teams were placed in the IL from the Triple-A Pacific Coast League in 2021.

- Iowa Oaks (1969–1981) → Iowa Cubs (1982–present)
- Memphis Redbirds (1998–present)
- Nashville Sounds (1978–present)
- Omaha Royals (1969–1998) → Omaha Golden Spikes (1999–2001) → Omaha Royals (2002–2010) → Omaha Storm Chasers (2011–present)

=== Former Southern League teams ===
One current team was placed in the IL from the Double-A Southern League in 2021.

- Jacksonville Suns (1962–1968, 1970–1984) → Jacksonville Expos (1985–1990) → Jacksonville Suns (1991–2016) → Jacksonville Jumbo Shrimp (2017–present)

=== Former independent teams ===
One current team was placed in the IL from the independent American Association of Professional Baseball in 2021.

- St. Paul Saints (1993–present)

== Champions ==
The International League has crowned a league champion each season since 1884. Through 1932, champions were the regular-season pennant winners—the team with the best win–loss record at the conclusion of the regular season. From 1933 to 2020, postseason playoffs were held to determine champions. Participants from 1933 to 1987 were usually the four teams with the highest winning percentage. From 1988 to 2020, the four qualifiers were the division winners and one or two wild card teams. The winner of each season's championship playoffs was awarded the Governors' Cup. These playoffs and the Governors' Cup trophy were discontinued in 2021. The 2021 winner was the team with the best regular-season record. The 2022 championship was decided via a single game between the winners of the East and West Divisions. Since 2023, a best-of-three series has been held between the winners of each half of the season.

Active International League teams appear in bold.

Championship wins by team
Team	Win(s)	Governors' Cup wins	Year(s)
**Rochester Red Wings** (Rochester Bronchos/Hustlers)	20	10	1899, 1901, 1909, 1910, 1911, 1928, 1929, 1930, 1931, 1939, 1952, 1955, 1956, 1964, 1971, 1974, 1988, 1990, 1997, 2026
**Columbus Clippers**	11	11	1979, 1980, 1981, 1987, 1991, 1992, 1996, 2010, 2011, 2015, 2019
Baltimore Orioles	10	2	1908, 1919, 1920, 1921, 1922, 1923, 1924, 1925, 1944, 1950
Buffalo Bisons (1886–1970)	10	4	1891, 1904, 1906, 1915, 1916, 1927, 1933, 1936, 1957, 1961
Toronto Maple Leafs	10	4	1902, 1907, 1912, 1917, 1918, 1926, 1934, 1960, 1965, 1966
**Durham Bulls**	8	8	2002, 2003, 2009, 2013, 2017, 2018, 2021, 2022
Montreal Royals	8	7	1898, 1941, 1946, 1948, 1949, 1951, 1953, 1958
**Syracuse Mets** (Syracuse Chiefs)	8	8	1935, 1942, 1943, 1947, 1954, 1969, 1970, 1976
**Norfolk Tides** (Tidewater Tides)	6	6	1972, 1975, 1982, 1983, 1985, 2023
Newark Bears	5	4	1932, 1937, 1938, 1940, 1945
Providence Grays (Providence Clamdiggers)	5	0	1894, 1896, 1900, 1905, 1914
Richmond Braves	5	5	1978, 1986, 1989, 1994, 2007
Pawtucket Red Sox	4	4	1973, 1984, 2012, 2014
Syracuse Stars	3	0	1885, 1888, 1897
**Toledo Mud Hens**	3	3	1967, 2005, 2006
**Buffalo Bisons** (1979–present)	2	2	1998, 2004
**Charlotte Knights**	2	2	1993, 1999
Detroit Wolverines	2	0	1889, 1890
**Indianapolis Indians**	2	2	1963, 2000
**Jacksonville Jumbo Shrimp** (Jacksonville Suns)	2	1	1968, 2025
**Scranton/Wilkes-Barre Highlanders** (Scranton/Wilkes-Barre Yankees/RailRiders)	2	2	2008, 2016
Atlanta Crackers	1	1	1962
Binghamton Bingoes	1	0	1892
Charleston Charlies	1	1	1977
Erie Blackbirds	1	0	1893
Havana Sugar Kings	1	1	1959
Jersey City Skeeters	1	0	1903
**Louisville Bats** (Louisville RiverBats)	1	1	2001
Newark Indians	1	0	1913
**Omaha Storm Chasers**	1	0	2024
Ottawa Lynx	1	1	1995
Springfield Maroons	1	0	1895
Toronto Canucks	1	0	1887
Trenton Trentonians	1	0	1884
Utica Pent-Ups	1	0	1886

== Awards ==
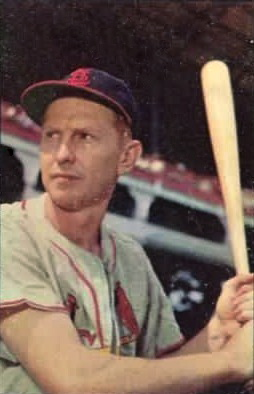
Baseball Hall of Famer Red Schoendienst won the IL Most Valuable Player Award in 1943.

The IL recognizes outstanding players and team personnel annually near the end of each season.

=== MVP Award ===
The Most Valuable Player Award, first awarded in 1932, is given to honor the best player in the league.

=== Pitcher of the Year Award ===
The Pitcher of the Year Award, first awarded in 1953 and known as the Most Valuable Pitcher Award, serves to recognize the league's best pitcher. Pitchers were eligible to win the award from 1932 to 1952 as no award was designated solely for pitchers.

=== Top MLB Prospect Award ===
The Top MLB Prospect Award, created in 1950 as the Rookie of the Year Award, is given to the best player with no prior IL experience.

=== Manager of the Year Award ===
The Manager of the Year Award, started in 1967, is given to the league's top manager.

=== Executive of the Year Award ===
The Executive of the Year Award, first awarded in 1964, honored team executives who contributed to the success of the league.

=== Spirit of the International League Award ===
The Spirit of the International League Award, first awarded in 2010, honored team executives who exhibited dedication to creating and maintaining positive fan experiences when visiting IL games.

== International League Hall of Fame ==
The International League Hall of Fame was established in 1947 to honor league players, managers, and executives who have made significant contributions to the league. The Hall of Fame inducted its first class of nine men in 1947. A plaque was unveiled at the IL's New York City offices located in the Ruppert Building at 535 Fifth Avenue. Today, the plaque has no permanent home, but exists as a traveling display that visits a number of the league's ballparks each season. The Hall became dormant after 1963, but was revived in 2007. New members are elected before the start of each season.

== See also ==
- List of International League no-hitters
- List of International League stadiums
- List of sports attendance figures
- List of International League principal owners
- Harry Simmons
