= List of International League no-hitters =

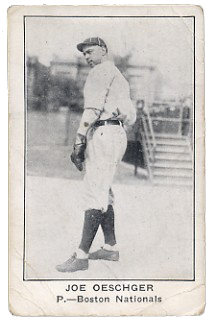
Joe Oeschger pitched the first nine-inning no-hitter in the International League on July 14, 1915, for the Jersey City Skeeters.

Since the foundation of the International League (IL) in 1912, its pitchers have thrown 178 no-hitters, which include 18 perfect games. Of these no-hitters, 87 were pitched in games that lasted at least the full 9 innings, while 88 were pitched in games shortened due to weather or that were played in doubleheaders, which are typically 7 innings. Only 5 of the league's 18 perfect games were tossed in full 9-inning games. Twenty-nine no-hitters were combined—thrown by two or more pitchers on the same team.

A no-hit game occurs when a pitcher (or pitchers) allows no hits during the entire course of a game. A batter may still reach base via a walk, an error, a fielder's choice, a hit by pitch, a passed ball or wild pitch on strike three, or catcher's interference. Due to these methods of reaching base, it is possible for a team to score runs without getting any hits. While the vast majority of no-hitters are shutouts, teams which went hitless have managed to score runs in their respective games 18 times in IL games, some in extra innings.

The first International League no-hitter was thrown on July 6, 1912, by John Frill of the Jersey City Skeeters against the Providence Grays at West Side Park in Jersey City, New Jersey. Played as the second game of a doubleheader, Frill allowed no baserunners over the course of the seven-inning game, making it also the first perfect game in the league's history. The first nine-inning no-hit game occurred on July 14, 1915, when Providence's Joe Oeschger accomplished the feat against the Toronto Maple Leafs at Kinsley Park in Providence, Rhode Island. The first nine-inning perfect game was thrown on August 15, 1952, by Dick Marlowe of the Buffalo Bisons against the Baltimore Orioles at Memorial Stadium in Baltimore, Maryland.

Nine league pitchers have thrown multiple no-hitters. The pitcher who holds the record for the shortest time between no-hit games is Rip Jordan, who pitched two for the Buffalo Bisons 45 days apart in 1919. In addition to Jordan, Augie Prudhomme (1927 and 1928), Bill Harris (1936 and 1937), Lou Polli (1937 and 1945), Earl Harrist (both in 1946), Duke Markell (1953 and 1955), Stan Bahnsen (1966 and 1967), Dave Vineyard (1966 and 1967), and Justin Wilson (both in 2012) have each thrown two no-hitters. An additional reliever, Cole Sulser, participated in two combined no-hitters (2019 and 2025).

The team with the most no-hitters is the Rochester Red Wings (previously known as the Hustlers and Tribe), with 20, two of which were perfect games. They are followed by the original Buffalo Bisons (17 no-hitters, 2 of them perfect games) and the Toronto Maple Leafs (17 no-hitters). The team with the most perfect games is the Syracuse Mets (previously known as the Chiefs and SkyChiefs), with three. Of the five nine-inning perfect games in the league's history, two were thrown by members of the Pawtucket Red Sox, both having occurred at McCoy Stadium.

== No-hitters ==
Key
Score	Game score with no-hitter team's runs listed first
Location	Stadium in italics denotes a no-hitter thrown in a home game.
Score (#)	A number following a score indicates number of innings in a game that was shorter or longer than 9 innings.
Pitcher (#)	A number following a pitcher's name indicates multiple no-hitters thrown.
IP	Innings pitched
†	Indicates a perfect game

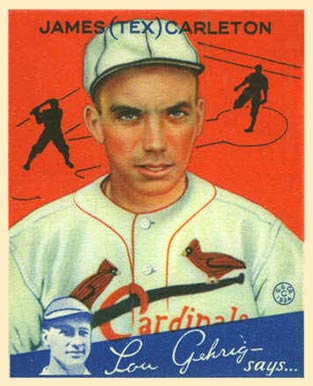
Tex Carleton, who pitched a no-hit game for the Rochester Red Wings on September 14, 1929, pitched a no-hitter for the Brooklyn Dodgers in 1940.

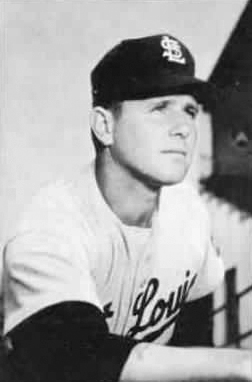
Virgil Trucks, who threw a no-hitter for the Buffalo Bisons on May 31, 1941, also pitched two no-hit games for the Detroit Tigers in 1952.

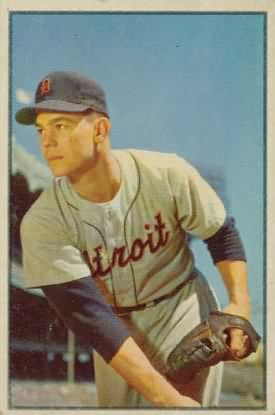
Art Houtteman pitched a no-hitter for the Buffalo Bisons on June 20, 1945, and played for the 1945 World Series champion Detroit Tigers.

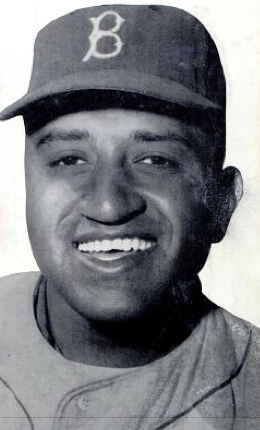
Don Newcombe, who tossed a no-hitter for the Montreal Royals on August 15, 1948, later won the first Cy Young Award in 1956.

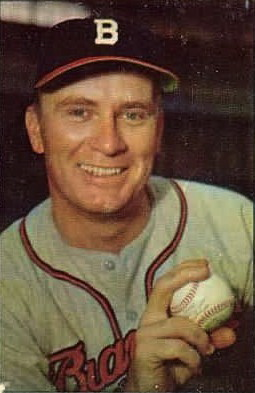
Jim Wilson, who pitched a no-hitter for the Buffalo Bisons on August 17, 1949, also pitched a no-hit game for the Milwaukee Braves in 1954.

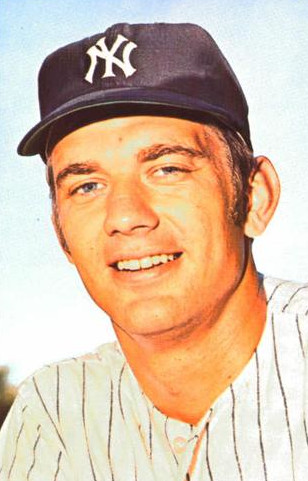
Stan Bahnsen recorded two IL no-hitters: first for the Toledo Mud Hens in 1966 and then a perfect game for the Syracuse Chiefs in 1967.

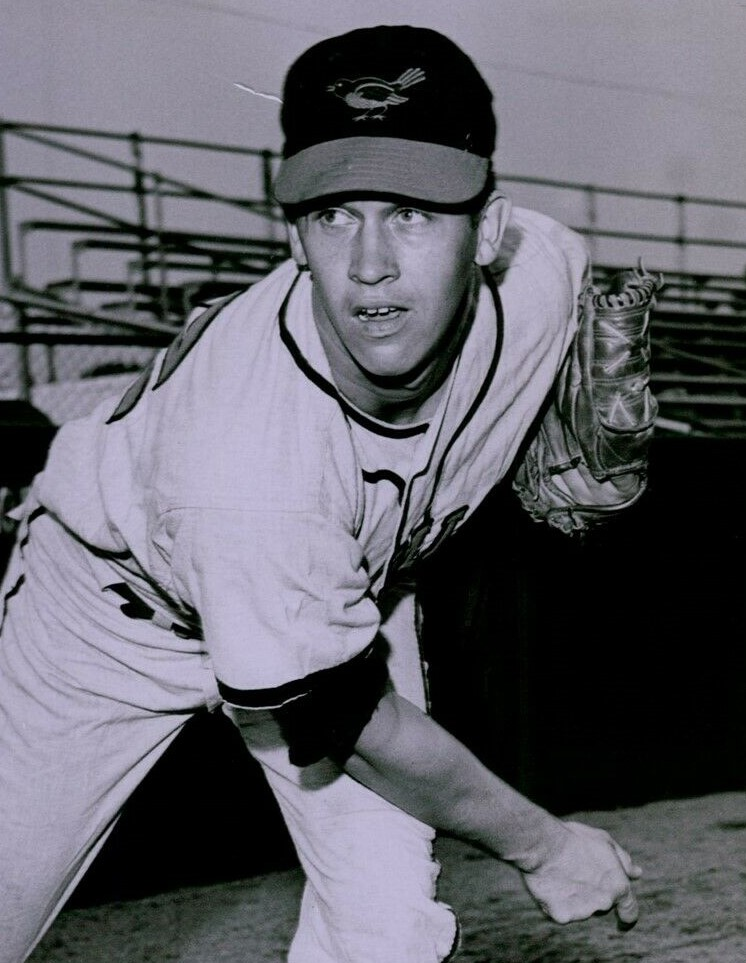
Dave Vineyard threw two IL no-hitters: for the Rochester Red Wings in 1966 and the Toronto Maple Leafs in 1967.

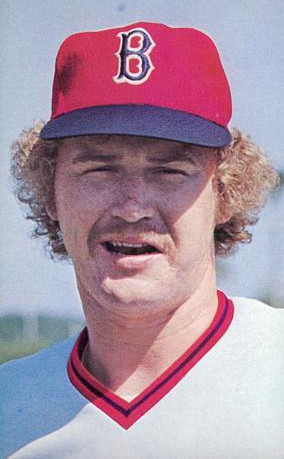
Dick Pole was selected for the IL Most Valuable Pitcher Award in 1973 after recording a no-hitter for the Pawtucket Red Sox on June 23.

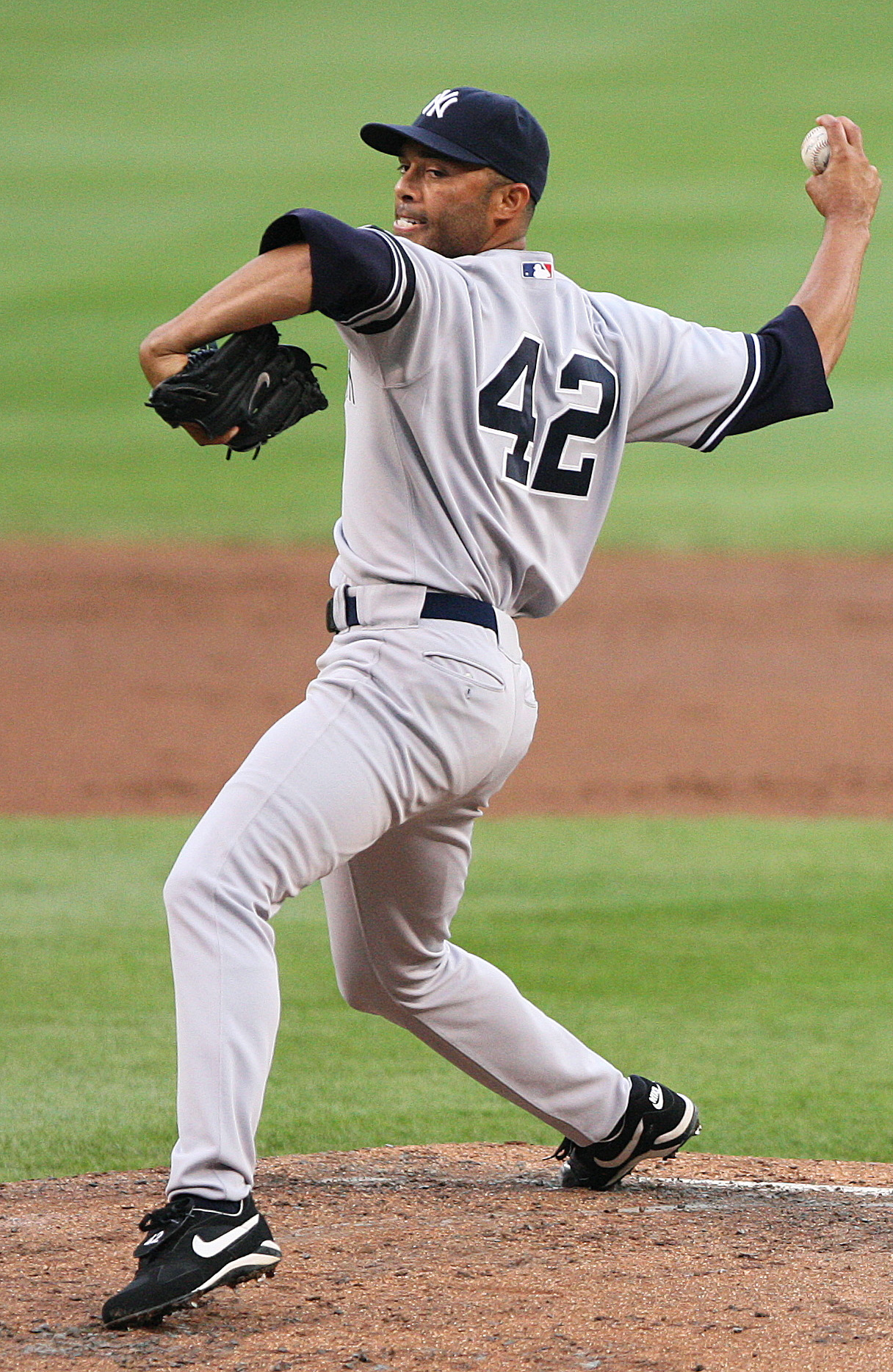
Mariano Rivera, who had a perfect game for the Columbus Clippers on June 26, 1995, was inducted into the Baseball Hall of Fame in 2019.

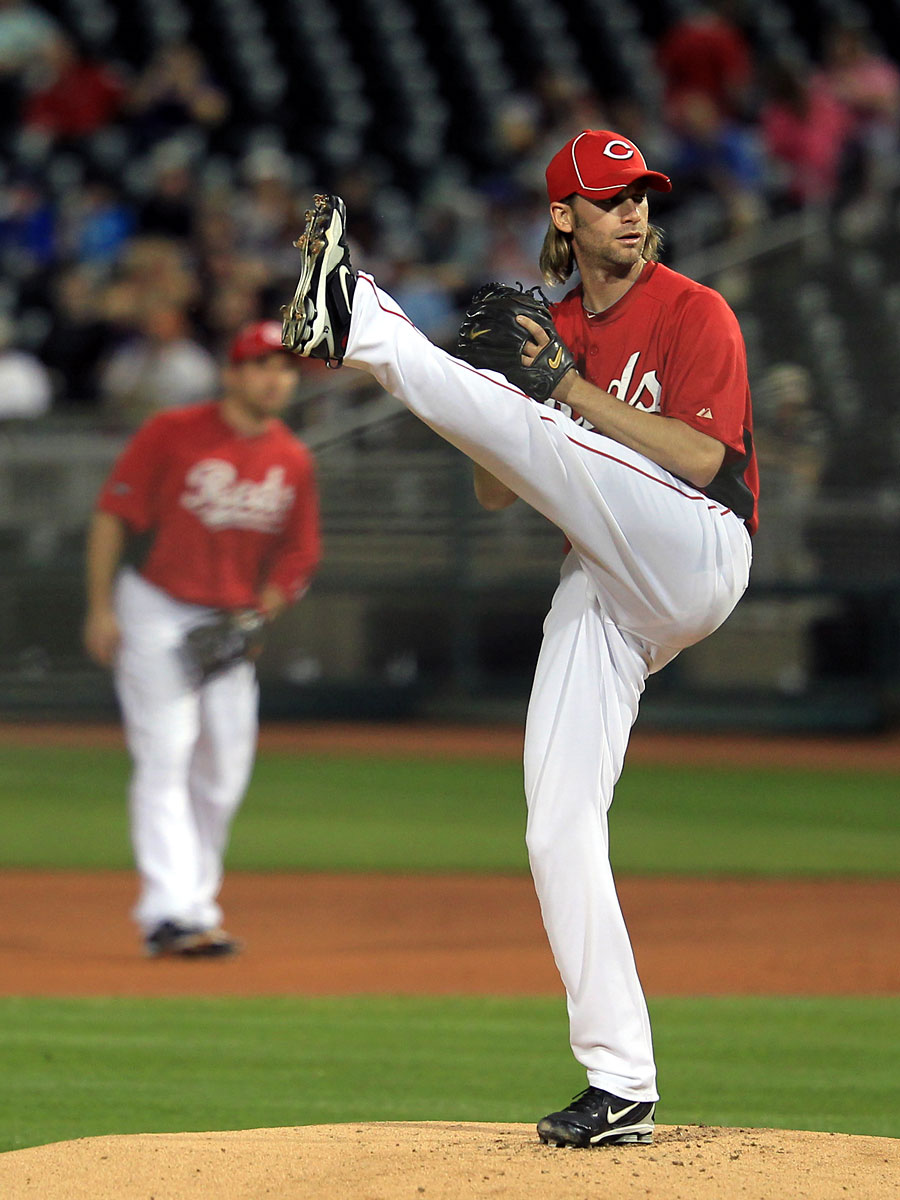
Bronson Arroyo pitched the IL's third nine-inning perfect game on August 10, 2003, for the Pawtucket Red Sox and was chosen for that season's Most Valuable Pitcher Award.

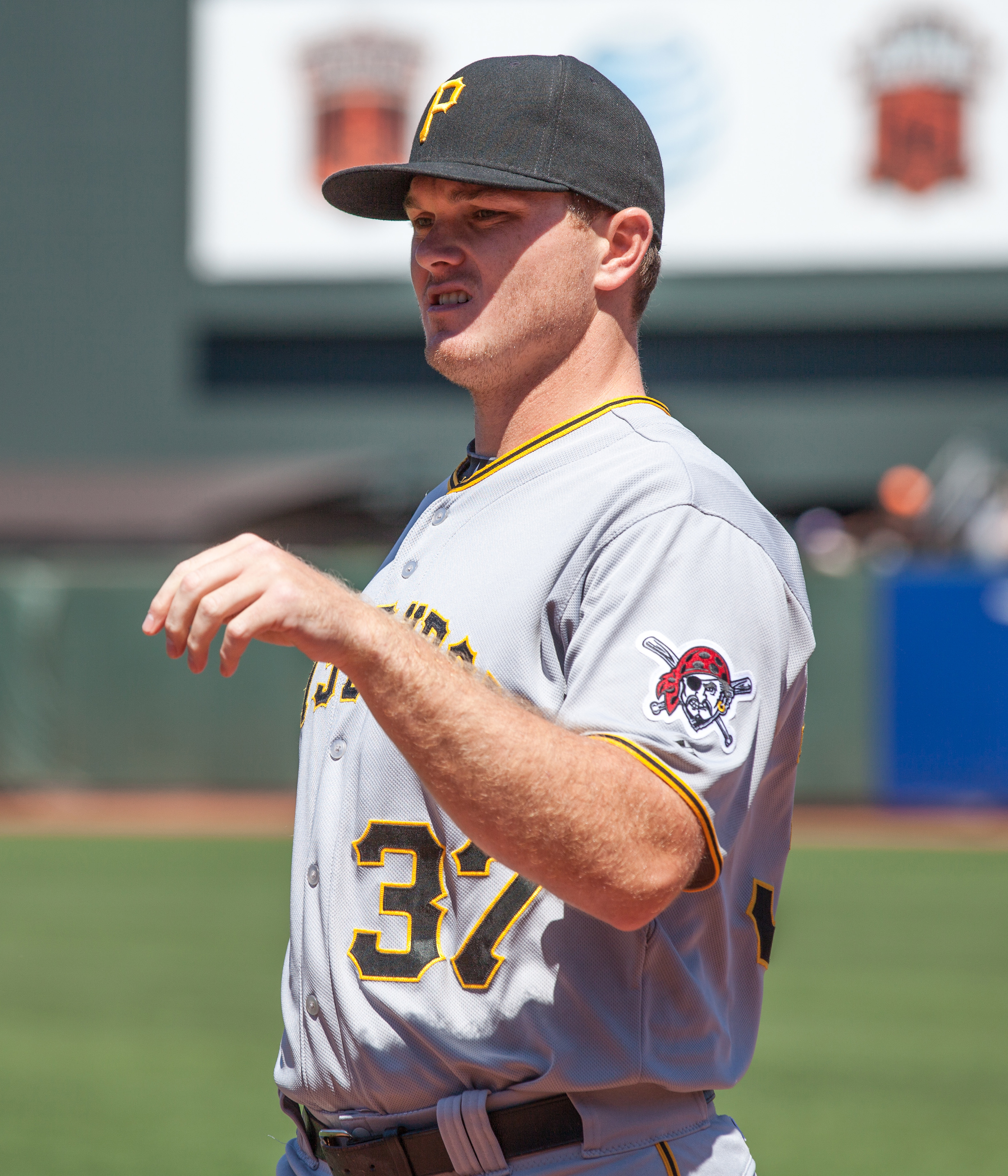
Justin Wilson participated in two no-hit games for the Indianapolis Indians in 2012: the first a combined effort and the second completed solo.

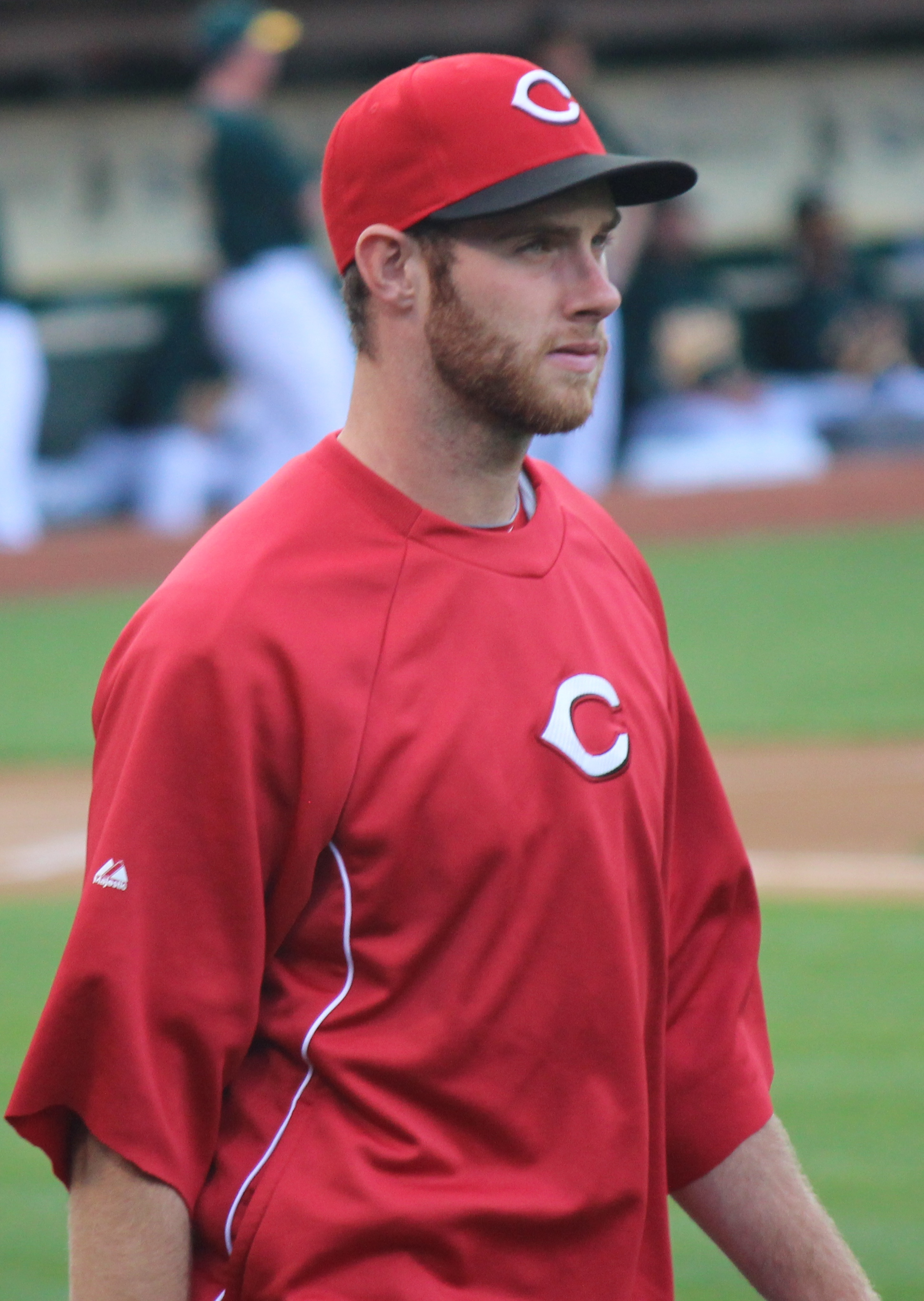
Tony Cingrani, who started a combined no-hitter for the Louisville Bats on July 12, 2015, pitched an inning of relief in another for the Los Angeles Dodgers in 2018.

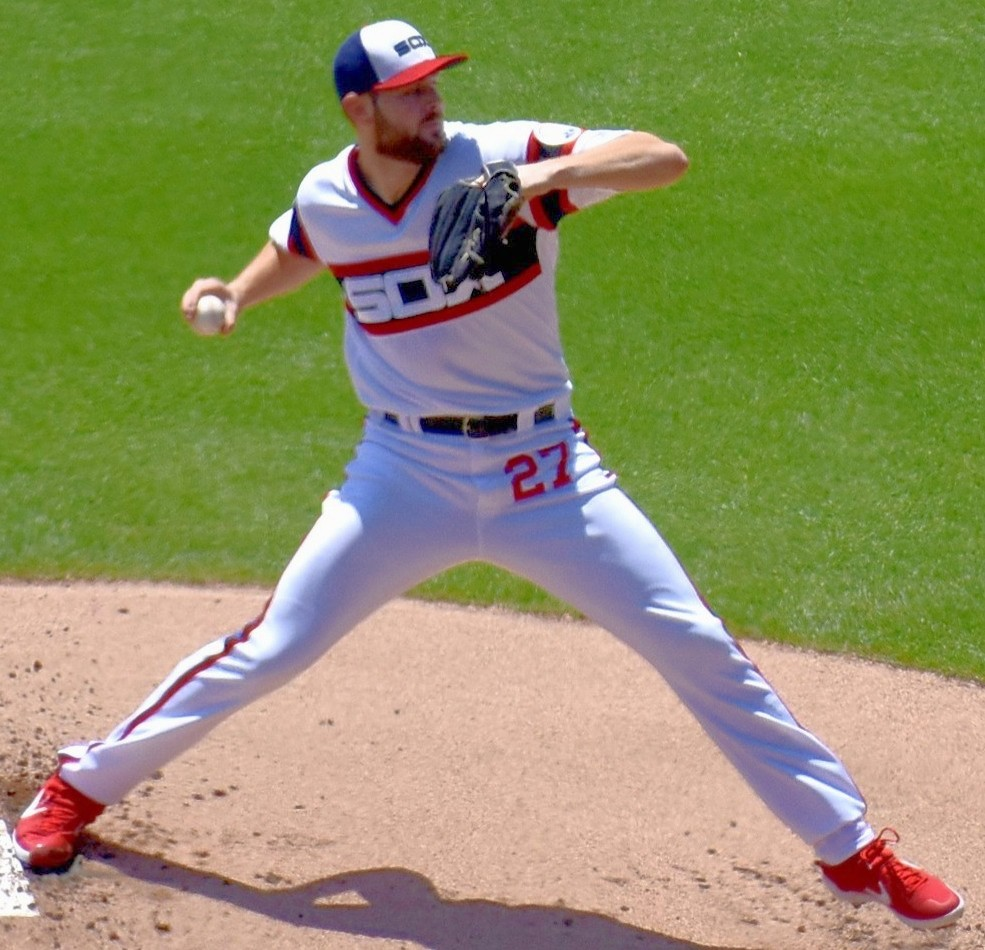
Lucas Giolito had a no-hit game for the Charlotte Knights on May 25, 2017, and pitched another for the Chicago White Sox in 2020.

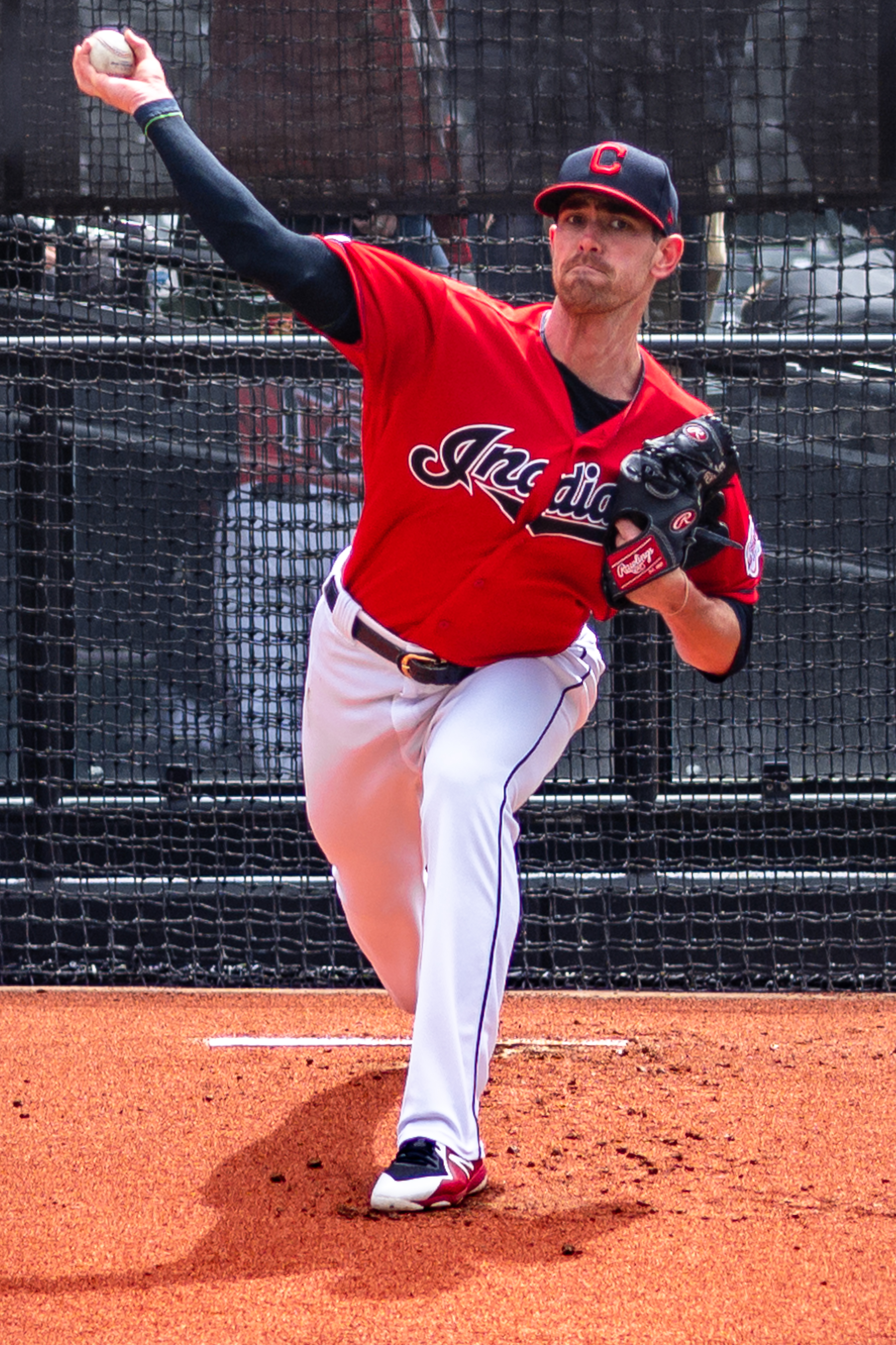
Shane Bieber, who threw a no-hitter for the Columbus Clippers on May 25, 2018, won the Cy Young Award in 2020.

No-hitters
No.	Date	Pitcher(s)	Team	Score	Opponent	Location	Ref.
1	July 6, 1912	John Frill^{†}	Jersey City Skeeters	4–0 (7)	Providence Grays	West Side Park	
2	July 25, 1914	Fred Herbert	Toronto Maple Leafs	15–0 (7)	Baltimore Orioles	Hanlan's Point Stadium	
3	August 11, 1914	Bill Upham^{†}	Rochester Hustlers	0–0 (5) (Note: The game was called due to rain in the top of the sixth inning, in which Rochester had scored a run, but the score reverted to that of the fifth. The game was scheduled to be resumed when Jersey City next visited Rochester, but it is unclear whether or not the game was played.)	Jersey City Skeeters	West Side Park	
4	July 14, 1915	Joe Oeschger	Providence Grays	1–0	Toronto Maple Leafs	Kinsley Park	
5	August 18, 1915	Fred Beebe	Buffalo Bisons	5–0	Montreal Royals	Buffalo Baseball Park	
6	September 10, 1915	Fred Winchell	Toronto Maple Leafs	5–1 (7) (Note: Harrisburg scored a run after Clarence Kraft walked, stole second base, advanced to third on throwing error, and came home on a fielding error in the fourth inning.)	Harrisburg Senators	Hanlan's Point Stadium	
7	July 22, 1916	Urban Shocker	Toronto Maple Leafs	1–0 (11)	Rochester Hustlers	Bay Street Ball Grounds	
8	May 12, 1919	Eddie Rommel	Newark Bears	1–0	Toronto Maple Leafs	Hanlan's Point Stadium	
9	May 14, 1919	Rip Jordan (1)	Buffalo Bisons	3–0	Jersey City Skeeters	Buffalo Baseball Park	
10	June 28, 1919	Rip Jordan (2)	Buffalo Bisons	0–3 (7) (Note: Toronto scored three runs as the result of errors in the first inning.)	Toronto Maple Leafs	Hanlan's Point Stadium	
11	August 8, 1919	Rosy Ryan	Buffalo Bisons	7–0 (7)	Reading Coal Barons	Lauer Park	
12	August 7, 1920	Alex Ferguson	Jersey City Skeeters	5–0 (6) (Note: Scheduled as part of a seven-inning doubleheader, the game was called due to rain after six innings.)	Rochester Hustlers	West Side Park	
13	April 22, 1921	Harry Biemiller	Jersey City Skeeters	1–0	Buffalo Bisons	West Side Park	
14	July 29, 1924	Claude Satterfield	Toronto Maple Leafs	1–0 (7)	Jersey City Skeeters	Hanlan's Point Stadium	
15	September 1, 1924	Francis Karpp	Rochester Tribe	8–0 (7)	Syracuse Stars	Star Park	
16	September 27, 1924	Bill Moore	Rochester Tribe	4–0	Syracuse Stars	Bay Street Ball Grounds	
17	August 22, 1925	Al Grabowski	Syracuse Stars	1–0	Providence Grays	Star Park	
18	June 20, 1926	Walt Leverenz	Buffalo Bisons	7–0	Reading Keystones	Lauer Park	
19	July 31, 1927	Syl Johnson	Syracuse Stars	2–0	Buffalo Bisons	Bison Stadium	
20	August 23, 1927	Augie Prudhomme (1)	Toronto Maple Leafs	14–0	Reading Keystones	Maple Leaf Stadium	
21	August 22, 1928	Augie Prudhomme (2)	Toronto Maple Leafs	5–0 (7)	Jersey City Skeeters	Maple Leaf Stadium	
22	September 14, 1929	Tex Carleton	Rochester Red Wings	3–1 (Note: Toronto scored a run after Nolen Richardson walked and came home as the result of two fielding errors in the seventh inning.)	Toronto Maple Leafs	Maple Leaf Stadium	
23	August 15, 1930	Lon Warneke	Reading Keystones	1–0 (7) (Note: The game was called due to rain in the seventh inning.)	Buffalo Bisons	Lauer Park	
24	June 19, 1932	Rufus Meadows	Newark Bears	8–0 (7)	Montreal Royals	Bear Stadium	
25	June 28, 1933	Fred Fussell	Albany Senators	4–0	Jersey City Skeeters	West Side Park	
26	July 4, 1934	Art Jones	Albany Senators	2–0	Baltimore Orioles	Oriole Park	
27	August 4, 1934	Cy Blanton	Albany Senators	0–0 (5) (Note: The game was called due to rain in the top of the sixth inning, in which Montreal had scored three runs, but the score reverted to that of the fifth.)	Montreal Royals	Hawkins Stadium	
28	May 2, 1936	Leroy Herrmann	Toronto Maple Leafs	1–0 (10)	Newark Bears	Maple Leaf Stadium	
29	May 3, 1936	Hank Johnson	Montreal Royals	2–0 (11) (Note: Johnson allowed no hits through nine innings before allowing one hit in the tenth.)	Syracuse Chiefs	Delorimier Stadium	
30	June 3, 1936	Bill Harris^{†} (1)	Buffalo Bisons	2–0 (7)	Toronto Maple Leafs	Maple Leaf Stadium	
31	July 30, 1936	Bill Harris (2)	Buffalo Bisons	4–0	Newark Bears	Ruppert Stadium	
32	June 19, 1937	Lou Polli (1)	Montreal Royals	6–0	Jersey City Giants	Roosevelt Stadium	
33	July 25, 1937	Whitey Moore	Syracuse Chiefs	1–0	Jersey City Giants	Municipal Stadium	
34	July 27, 1937	Ken Ash	Buffalo Bisons	2–0 (7)	Syracuse Chiefs	Offermann Stadium	
35	May 16, 1939	Roy Weir	Toronto Maple Leafs	8–0	Baltimore Orioles	Maple Leaf Stadium	
36	May 31, 1941	Virgil Trucks	Buffalo Bisons	0–1 (10) (Note: Trucks allowed no hits through nine innings before allowing three hits in the tenth.)	Montreal Royals	Offermann Stadium	
37	August 20, 1941	Max Surkont	Rochester Red Wings	1–0 (7)	Jersey City Giants	Roosevelt Stadium	
38	September 19, 1942 (Note: Game One of the postseason Governors' Cup finals)	Johnnie Wittig	Jersey City Giants	0–1 (11) (Note: Whitig allowed no hits through ten innings before allowing a hit in the eleventh. Syracuse scored the winning run in the thirteenth inning.)	Syracuse Chiefs	Roosevelt Stadium	
39	April 25, 1943	Rufe Gentry	Buffalo Bisons	1–0 (11)	Newark Bears	Ruppert Stadium	
40	August 17, 1943	Blix Donnelly	Rochester Red Wings	4–0	Jersey City Giants	Red Wing Stadium	
41	September 5, 1943	Monk Dubiel	Newark Bears	3–0 (7)	Syracuse Chiefs	Ruppert Stadium	
42	September 6, 1943	Tom Ananicz	Toronto Maple Leafs	1–0 (7)	Buffalo Bisons	Maple Leaf Stadium	
43	July 18, 1944	Sid West	Baltimore Orioles	5–0	Jersey City Giants	Municipal Stadium	
44	August 8, 1944	Hod Lisenbee	Syracuse Chiefs	8–0 (7)	Montreal Royals	MacArthur Stadium	
45	June 20, 1945	Art Houtteman	Buffalo Bisons	0–2 (8) (Note: Houtteman allowed no hits through seven innings in the seven-inning doubleheader before allowing a hit in the eighth.)	Jersey City Giants	Offermann Stadium	
46	September 3, 1945	Lou Polli (2)	Jersey City Giants	11–0	Newark Bears	Ruppert Stadium	
47	April 30, 1946	Earl Harrist (1)	Syracuse Chiefs	5–0	Buffalo Bisons	MacArthur Stadium	
48	July 29, 1946	Earl Harrist (2)	Syracuse Chiefs	5–0	Toronto Maple Leafs	MacArthur Stadium	
49	June 14, 1948	Oscar Judd	Toronto Maple Leafs	7–0 (7) (Note: The game was called due to rain after seven innings.)	Syracuse Chiefs	MacArthur Stadium	
50	August 15, 1948	Don Newcombe	Montreal Royals	8–0 (7)	Toronto Maple Leafs	Delorimier Stadium	
51	May 7, 1949	Al Porto	Toronto Maple Leafs	5–0 (7)	Newark Bears	Maple Leaf Stadium	
52	August 17, 1949	Jim Wilson	Buffalo Bisons	5–0 (7) (Note: The game was called due to rain in the top of the seventh inning.)	Jersey City Giants	Offermann Stadium	
53	August 6, 1950	Jake Wade	Buffalo Bisons	2–0 (7)	Syracuse Chiefs	Offermann Stadium	
54	June 17, 1951	George Bamberger	Ottawa Giants	1–0	Toronto Maple Leafs	Maple Leaf Stadium	
55	July 22, 1951	Duke Simpson	Buffalo Bisons	3–0 (7)	Toronto Maple Leafs	Offermann Stadium	
56	May 24, 1952	Charlie Bishop	Ottawa Athletics	1–0	Syracuse Chiefs	Lansdowne Park	
57	June 8, 1952	Wayne McLeland	Buffalo Bisons	4–0 (7)	Ottawa Athletics	Offermann Stadium	
58	August 15, 1952	Dick Marlowe^{†}	Buffalo Bisons	2–0	Baltimore Orioles	Memorial Stadium	
59	September 5, 1952	Jackie Collum	Rochester Red Wings	9–0	Ottawa Athletics	Lansdowne Park	
60	August 6, 1953	Duke Markell (1)	Syracuse Chiefs	4–1 (7) (Note: Toronto scored a run after Bob Addis reached first base by a fielder's choice, advanced to second when another batter walked, reached third on a fielding error, and came home on a bases-loaded walk in the fourth inning.)	Toronto Maple Leafs	MacArthur Stadium	
61	August 10, 1953	Dave Hillman	Springfield Cubs	5–0	Toronto Maple Leafs	Maple Leaf Stadium	
62	August 11, 1953	Arthur Hartley	Syracuse Chiefs	4–1 (7) (Note: Montreal scored a run after Sandy Amorós walked and came home on a wild throw in the fourth inning.)	Montreal Royals	MacArthur Stadium	
63	September 9, 1953	Frank Lary	Buffalo Bisons	5–0 (7)	Ottawa Athletics	Lansdowne Park	
64	April 29, 1955	Duke Markell (2)	Rochester Red Wings	9–0	Columbus Jets	Red Wing Stadium	
65	August 14, 1955	Dick Hoover	Columbus Jets	10–0 (7)	Richmond Virginians	Jets Stadium	
66	August 18, 1955	Ken Lehman^{†}	Montreal Royals	3–0 (7)	Columbus Jets	Jets Stadium	
67	June 5, 1956	Don Johnson	Toronto Maple Leafs	2–0 (7)	Columbus Jets	Jets Stadium	
68	June 16, 1956	Lynn Lovenguth	Toronto Maple Leafs	8–0	Richmond Virginians	Maple Leaf Stadium	
69	August 17, 1958	Rudy Árias	Havana Sugar Kings	7–0 (7)	Rochester Red Wings	Gran Estadio de La Habana	
70	June 16, 1960	Frank Funk	Toronto Maple Leafs	1–0 (7)	Havana Sugar Kings	Maple Leaf Stadium	
71	September 3, 1960	Al Cicotte	Toronto Maple Leafs	1–0 (11)	Montreal Royals	Maple Leaf Stadium	
72	July 1, 1961	Rip Coleman	Toronto Maple Leafs	3–0 (7)	Richmond Virginians	Maple Leaf Stadium	
73	July 4, 1961	Art Quirk	Rochester Red Wings	5–0 (7)	Syracuse Chiefs	Red Wing Stadium	
74	May 12, 1962	Al Downing	Richmond Virginians	4–0	Syracuse Chiefs	Parker Field	
75	June 9, 1963	Natividad Martinez	Rochester Red Wings	5–0 (7)	Jacksonville Suns	Red Wing Stadium	
76	July 4, 1963	Bill Smith	Arkansas Travelers	4–0 (7)	Indianapolis Indians	Victory Field	
77	July 22, 1963	Diomedes Olivo	Atlanta Crackers	1–0 (7)	Toronto Maple Leafs	Maple Leaf Stadium	
78	July 26, 1964	John Miller	Rochester Red Wings	2–0 (7)	Columbus Jets	Jets Stadium	
79	July 4, 1965	Pete Mikkelsen	Toledo Mud Hens	2–0	Atlanta Crackers	Atlanta Stadium	
80	August 17, 1965	Larry Maxie	Atlanta Crackers	1–0 (7)	Toledo Mud Hens	Atlanta Stadium	
81	July 17, 1966	Stan Bahnsen (1)	Toledo Mud Hens	1–0 (7)	Richmond Braves	Lucas County Stadium	
82	July 28, 1966	Dave Vineyard (1)	Rochester Red Wings	1–0	Toledo Mud Hens	Lucas County Stadium	
83	August 15, 1966	Tom Phoebus	Rochester Red Wings	1–0 (7)	Buffalo Bisons	Red Wing Stadium	
84	May 23, 1967	Dave Vineyard (2)	Toronto Maple Leafs	2–1 (Note: Montreal scored a run after Steve Demeter walked, advanced to second base on a sacrifice, moved up to third on a throwing error, and came home on an fielder's choice in the sixth inning.)	Rochester Red Wings	Maple Leaf Stadium	
85	July 9, 1967	Stan Bahnsen^{†} (2)	Syracuse Chiefs	8–0 (7)	Buffalo Bisons	MacArthur Stadium	
86	May 4, 1969	Marcelino López	Rochester Red Wings	5–1 (7) (Note: Richmond scored a run after Jack Damaska walked, advanced to third base on a fielding error, and came home on a sacrifice fly in the seventh inning.)	Richmond Braves	Parker Field	
87	August 24, 1970	Billy Farmer	Louisville Colonels	8–0 (7)	Toledo Mud Hens	Lucas County Stadium	
88	May 28, 1971	Greg Arnold	Rochester Red Wings	6–0 (7)	Charleston Charlies	Watt Powell Stadium	
89	August 31, 1971	Mike Pazik	Syracuse Chiefs	5–0	Rochester Red Wings	MacArthur Stadium	
90	June 30, 1972	Rich Hinton	Syracuse Chiefs	5–0 (7)	Toledo Mud Hens	Lucas County Stadium	
91	July 16, 1972	Joe Niekro^{†}	Toledo Mud Hens	2–0 (7)	Tidewater Tides	Lucas County Stadium	
92	August 6, 1972	Tommy Moore	Tidewater Tides	2–0 (7)	Rochester Red Wings	Metropolitan Memorial Park	
93	June 23, 1973	Dick Pole	Pawtucket Red Sox	2–0 (7)	Peninsula Whips	War Memorial Stadium	
94	August 2, 1973	Bill Kouns	Pawtucket Red Sox	1–0 (7)	Richmond Braves	Parker Field	
95	April 20, 1974	Wayne Garland	Rochester Red Wings	5–0	Charleston Charlies	Watt Powell Stadium	
96	June 7, 1974	Hank Webb	Tidewater Tides	1–0 (7)	Rochester Red Wings	Metropolitan Memorial Park	
97	July 21, 1974	Chuck Ross	Pawtucket Red Sox	4–0 (7)	Rochester Red Wings	McCoy Stadium	
98	August 16, 1974	Gary Robson^{†}	Rochester Red Wings	2–0 (7)	Charleston Charlies	Silver Stadium	
99	June 8, 1975	Jim Burton	Pawtucket Red Sox	2–0	Tidewater Tides	McCoy Stadium	
100	June 20, 1975	Wayne Simpson	Toledo Mud Hens	3–0 (7)	Syracuse Chiefs	MacArthur Stadium	
101	May 30, 1976	Rick Langford	Charleston Charlies	11–0	Memphis Blues	Tim McCarver Stadium	
102	June 1, 1977	Mickey Mahler	Richmond Braves	7–0	Toledo Mud Hens	Parker Field	
103	July 25, 1977	Rod Scurry	Columbus Clippers	2–0 (7)	Richmond Braves	Franklin County Stadium	
104	August 16, 1986	Don Cooper (5 IP) Colin McLaughlin (2 IP)	Syracuse Chiefs	4–0 (7)	Richmond Braves	The Diamond	
105	July 6, 1987	Steve Curry	Pawtucket Red Sox	11–0	Richmond Braves	The Diamond	
106	June 8, 1988	Scott Nielsen	Columbus Clippers	3–0	Maine Phillies	Cooper Stadium	
107	June 27, 1988	John Mitchell^{†}	Tidewater Tides	4–0 (7)	Indianapolis Indians (Note: This was an interleague game played against an American Association opponent as part of the Triple-A Alliance.)	Metropolitan Memorial Park	
108	July 28, 1988	Marvin Freeman	Maine Phillies	6–0 (7)	Richmond Braves	The Diamond	
109	June 27, 1989	Charlie Puleo (5 IP) Steve Ziem (4 IP)	Richmond Braves	3–0	Oklahoma City 89ers	All Sports Stadium	
110	May 25, 1990	Wally Ritchie	Scranton/Wilkes-Barre Red Barons	1–0 (8) (Note: Ritchie allowed no hits through seven innings in the seven-inning doubleheader before allowing a hit in the eighth.)	Syracuse Chiefs	Lackawanna County Stadium	
111	July 23, 1990	Danny Boone	Rochester Red Wings	2–0 (7)	Syracuse Chiefs	Silver Stadium	
112	July 5, 1991	Kevin Mmahat	Columbus Clippers	6–0	Louisville Redbirds	Cardinal Stadium	
113	May 3, 1992	Pete Smith^{†}	Richmond Braves	1–0 (7)	Rochester Red Wings	Silver Stadium	
114	May 15, 1992	Dave Telgheder	Tidewater Tides	1–0	Pawtucket Red Sox	Metropolitan Memorial Park	
115	July 25, 1992	Ben Rivera	Scranton/Wilkes-Barre Red Barons	2–0 (7)	Pawtucket Red Sox	Lackawanna County Stadium	
116	May 24, 1993	Chris Nabholz (8 IP) Bruce Walton (1 IP)	Ottawa Lynx	4–0	Richmond Braves	JetForm Park	
117	June 1, 1993	Tim Brown^{†}	Syracuse Chiefs	2–0 (7)	Toledo Mud Hens	MacArthur Stadium	
118	July 4, 1993	Tyler Green	Scranton/Wilkes-Barre Red Barons	3–1 (7) (Note: Ottawa scored a run after Curtis Pride walked, advanced to third base on a wild pickoff throw, and came home on a sacrifice fly in the fourth inning.)	Ottawa Lynx	Lackawanna County Stadium	
119	May 4, 1994	Felipe Lira	Toledo Mud Hens	4–0 (7)	Columbus Clippers	Cooper Stadium	
120	August 17, 1994	José Lima	Toledo Mud Hens	3–0	Pawtucket Red Sox	Ned Skeldon Stadium	
121	June 26, 1995	Mariano Rivera^{†}	Columbus Clippers	3–0 (5) (Note: Scheduled as part of a seven-inning doubleheader, the game was called due to rain in the middle of the fifth inning.)	Rochester Red Wings	Cooper Stadium	
122	August 21, 1996	Randy Marshall (5 IP) Mike Walker (2 IP)	Toledo Mud Hens	2–1 (7) (Note: Charlotte scored a run after Quilvio Veras walked, stole second base, advanced to third on a throwing error, and came home on a sacrifice fly in the seventh inning.)	Charlotte Knights	Ned Skeldon Stadium	
123	July 22, 1998	Juan Peña	Pawtucket Red Sox	5–0	Durham Bulls	McCoy Stadium	
124	July 19, 1999	Shayne Bennett (5 IP) Jayson Durocher (4 IP)	Ottawa Lynx	10–0	Syracuse SkyChiefs	P&C Stadium	
125	May 14, 2000	Larry Luebbers	Louisville RiverBats	5–0 (7)	Charlotte Knights	Knights Stadium	
126	June 1, 2000	Tomo Ohka^{†}	Pawtucket Red Sox	2–0	Charlotte Knights	McCoy Stadium	
127	June 17, 2000	Leo Estrella^{†}	Syracuse SkyChiefs	5–0 (7)	Indianapolis Indians	Victory Field	
128	July 18, 2000	Paxton Crawford	Pawtucket Red Sox	3–0 (7)	Ottawa Lynx	JetForm Park	
129	May 29, 2001	Steve Trachsel	Norfolk Tides	3–0 (7)	Ottawa Lynx	Harbor Park	
130	June 10, 2002	Adrián Hernández (5 IP) Bob Scanlan (2 IP) Kevin Lovingier (2 IP)	Columbus Clippers	15–1 (Note: Indianapolis scored a run after Izzy Alcántara walked, stole second base, advanced to third on a fly out, and come home on a sacrifice fly in the second inning.)	Indianapolis Indians	Cooper Stadium	
131	August 10, 2003	Bronson Arroyo^{†}	Pawtucket Red Sox	7–0	Buffalo Bisons	McCoy Stadium	
132	June 6, 2004	Robert Ellis	Scranton/Wilkes-Barre Red Barons	1–0 (7)	Louisville Bats	Lackawanna County Stadium	
133	August 1, 2004	Tetsu Yofu	Charlotte Knights	5–0	Durham Bulls	Knights Stadium	
134	May 15, 2005	Ian Snell	Indianapolis Indians	4–0	Norfolk Tides	Victory Field	
135	July 16, 2006	Jason Hammel (8 1/3 IP) Juan Salas (2/3 IP)	Durham Bulls	4–1 (Note: Columbus scored a run after Russ Johnson was hit by a pitch by Hammel, advanced to second base on an error, and come home on a wild pitch by Salas in the ninth inning.)	Columbus Clippers	Durham Bulls Athletic Park	
136	September 3, 2006	Jeremy Cummings	Scranton/Wilkes-Barre Red Barons	5–0	Rochester Red Wings	Frontier Field	
137	June 18, 2009	Carlos Torres^{†}	Charlotte Knights	5–0 (5) (Note: The game was called due to rain after five innings.)	Pawtucket Red Sox	McCoy Stadium	
138	April 28, 2010	Chris Tillman	Norfolk Tides	6–0	Gwinnett Braves	Coolray Field	
139	May 28, 2010	Todd Redmond	Gwinnett Braves	4–0	Louisville Bats	Louisville Slugger Field	
140	July 6, 2011	Jeff Manship (4 IP) Jake Stevens (3 IP) Kyle Waldrop (1 IP) Jim Hoey (1 IP)	Rochester Red Wings	7–0	Lehigh Valley IronPigs	Frontier Field	
141	July 26, 2011	Justin Germano^{†}	Columbus Clippers	3–0	Syracuse Chiefs	Alliance Bank Stadium	
142	April 29, 2012	Justin Wilson (7 1/3 IP) (1) Jumbo Díaz (2/3 IP) Doug Slaten (1 IP)	Indianapolis Indians	2–0	Durham Bulls	Durham Bulls Athletic Park	
143	August 9, 2012	Justin Wilson (2)	Indianapolis Indians	3–0 (8) (Note: The game was called due to rain in the middle of the eighth inning.)	Charlotte Knights	Victory Field	
144	May 5, 2013	Jake Odorizzi (7 IP) Frank De Los Santos (2/3 IP) Kirby Yates (1 IP) Jeff Beliveau (1/3 IP)	Durham Bulls	2–1 (Note: Pawtucket scored a run after Ryan Lavarnway walked, advanced to second base after another batter walked, moved up to third on a sacrifice bunt, and come home on a sacrifice fly in the ninth inning.)	Pawtucket Red Sox	McCoy Stadium	
145	July 25, 2013	André Rienzo	Charlotte Knights	1–0 (7)	Indianapolis Indians	Knights Stadium	
146	April 26, 2014	Mike Montgomery (8 1/3 IP) Brad Boxberger (2/3 IP)	Durham Bulls	5–0	Scranton/Wilkes-Barre RailRiders	Durham Bulls Athletic Park	
147	July 24, 2014 (Note: The game began on July 24 at Durham Bulls Athletic Park but was suspended due to rain in the middle of the third inning. It was resumed on August 11 at Rochester's Frontier Field.)	Trevor May (3 IP) Logan Darnell (6 IP)	Rochester Red Wings	3–0	Durham Bulls	Durham Bulls Athletic Park; Frontier Field	
148	July 30, 2014	Tyler Cloyd	Columbus Clippers	13–0	Louisville Bats	Huntington Park	
149	July 12, 2015	Tony Cingrani (4 IP) David Holmberg (3 IP) Sam LeCure (2 IP)	Louisville Bats	5–0	Toledo Mud Hens	Fifth Third Field	
150	April 23, 2016	Warwick Saupold (5 IP) Preston Guilmet (2 IP) Logan Kensing (1 IP) Bobby Parnell (1 IP)	Toledo Mud Hens	5–0	Charlotte Knights	Fifth Third Field	
151	June 30, 2016	Rob Wooten (6 IP) Matt Marksberry (2 IP) José Ramírez (1 IP)	Gwinnett Braves	3–0	Louisville Bats	Louisville Slugger Field	
152	July 16, 2016	Justin Marks	Durham Bulls	2–0	Syracuse Chiefs	NBT Bank Stadium	
153	May 25, 2017	Lucas Giolito	Charlotte Knights	4–0 (7)	Syracuse Chiefs	BB&T Ballpark	
154	April 18, 2018	Austin Voth (3 IP) David Goforth (2 IP) Tim Collins (1 IP) Austin Adams (1 IP)	Syracuse Chiefs	7–0 (7)	Indianapolis Indians	NBT Bank Stadium	
155	May 25, 2018	Shane Bieber	Columbus Clippers	7–0 (7) (Note: The game was called due to rain in the top of the eighth inning.)	Gwinnett Stripers	Coolray Field	
156	June 2, 2018	Adam Plutko	Columbus Clippers	6–0	Syracuse Chiefs	NBT Bank Stadium	
157	July 5, 2019	Jake Cronenworth (1 IP) Luis Santos (3 IP) Cole Sulser (1) (3 IP)	Durham Bulls	5–0 (7)	Gwinnett Stripers	Coolray Field	
158	August 7, 2019	Arturo Reyes (3 IP) Ricardo Pinto (4 2/3 IP) José Alvarado (1/3 IP) Hoby Milner (1 IP)	Durham Bulls	2–1 (Note: Syracuse scored a run after Rymer Liriano walked, advanced to second base after another batter was hit by a pitch, moved up to third on a sacrifice bunt, and come home on a fielder's choice in the eighth inning.)	Syracuse Mets	Durham Bulls Athletic Park	
159	August 19, 2019	T. J. Zeuch	Buffalo Bisons	3–0	Rochester Red Wings	Frontier Field	
160	May 9, 2021	Shelby Miller (3 IP) Tommy Nance (3 IP) Brad Wieck (2 IP) Ryan Meisinger (1 IP)	Iowa Cubs	2–0	Indianapolis Indians	Principal Park	
161	July 11, 2021	Justin Steele (3 2/3 IP) Scott Effross (1 1/3 IP) Dillon Maples (2 IP)	Iowa Cubs	1–0 (7)	St. Paul Saints	Principal Park	
162	July 21, 2021	Luis Gil (6 IP) Reggie McClain (2 IP) Stephen Ridings (1 IP)	Scranton/Wilkes-Barre RailRiders	8–0	Rochester Red Wings	PNC Field	
163	August 19, 2021	Sean Boyle	Scranton/Wilkes-Barre RailRiders	5–0 (7)	Worcester Red Sox	Polar Park	
164	April 13, 2022	Chase De Jong (7 IP) Austin Brice (1 IP) Yerry De Los Santos (1 IP)	Indianapolis Indians	5–0	St. Paul Saints	CHS Field	
165	August 4, 2022	Michael Wacha (4 2/3 IP) Andrew Politi (2 1/3 IP) Chase Shugart (2 IP)	Worcester Red Sox	12–0	Durham Bulls	Polar Park	
166	September 1, 2023	Devin Smeltzer	Jacksonville Jumbo Shrimp	3–0 (7)	Charlotte Knights	121 Financial Ballpark	
167	May 3, 2024	Chayce McDermott (6 2/3 IP) Nolan Hoffman (1 1/3 IP) Kaleb Ort (1 IP)	Norfolk Tides	2–0	Nashville Sounds	First Horizon Park	
168	June 16, 2024	Garrett Schoenle (3 IP) Fraser Ellard (1 IP) Jordan Leasure (2/3 IP) Joe Barlow (2/3 IP) Sammy Peralta (1 1/3 IP) Deivi García (1 1/3 IP) Adisyn Coffey (1 IP)	Charlotte Knights	2–0	Durham Bulls	Durham Bulls Athletic Park	
169	September 19, 2024	Connor Gillispie (5 IP) Randy Labaut (2 IP) Anthony Gose (1 IP) Tanner Burns (1 IP)	Columbus Clippers	2–0	Toledo Mud Hens	Fifth Third Field	
170	April 17, 2025	Cooper Criswell (4 IP) Isaiah Campbell (2 IP) Jacob Webb (1 IP)	Worcester Red Sox	8–0 (7)	Rochester Red Wings	Innovative Field	
171	April 19, 2025	Joe Boyle (6 IP) Cole Sulser (2) (2 IP) Jacob Waguespack (1 IP)	Durham Bulls	4–0	Scranton/Wilkes-Barre RailRiders	Durham Bulls Athletic Park	
172	June 27, 2025	Anderson Pilar (2 IP) Matt Pushard (3 IP) Christian Roa (2 IP) George Soriano (2 IP)	Jacksonville Jumbo Shrimp	15–3 (Note: Nashville scored three runs in the ninth inning. After Raynel Delgado was hit by a pitch and Freddy Zamora and Jeferson Quero drew back-to-back walks, Delado scored on fielding error and Zamora and Quero scored on consecutive forceouts.)	Nashville Sounds	VyStar Ballpark	
173	April 21, 2026	Braxton Garrett	Jacksonville Jumbo Shrimp	0–2 (Note: Gwinnett scored two runs in the sixth inning. After Brewer Hicklen and Jim Jarvis were hit by a pitch in consecutive plate appearances, Hicklen scored on a wild pitch and Jarvis scored on a sacrifice fly.)	Gwinnett Stripers	Gwinnett Field	
174	June 5, 2026	Brendan Beck (7 IP) Carson Coleman (2 IP)	Scranton/Wilkes-Barre RailRiders	4–0	Syracuse Mets	NBT Bank Stadium	
175	August 9, 2026	Jace Beck	Jacksonville Jumbo Shrimp	4–0 (5) (Note: The game was called due to rain after the fifth inning.)	Gwinnett Stripers	Gwinnett Field	
176	August 23, 2026	Brandon Sproat (3 IP) Tate Kuehner (4 IP)	Nashville Sounds	2–0 (7)	Norfolk Tides	Harbor Park	
177	August 30, 2026	Kevin Herget (1.2 IP) Saul Garcia (1.1 IP) Tobias Myers (3 IP) Chayce McDermott (1 IP) Joe Jacques (1 IP) Zach Franklin (1 IP)	Syracuse Mets	8–0	Lehigh Valley IronPigs	Coca-Cola Park	
178	September 7, 2026	Thomas Pannone^{†}	Nashville Sounds	3–0	Durham Bulls	Durham Bulls Athletic Park	

== No-hitters by team ==
Active International League teams appear in bold.

Team	No-hitters	Perfect games
**Rochester Red Wings** (Rochester Hustlers/Tribe)	20	2
Buffalo Bisons (1886–1970)	17	2
Toronto Maple Leafs	17	0
**Syracuse Mets** (Syracuse Chiefs/SkyChiefs)	14	3
**Columbus Clippers**	10	2
Pawtucket Red Sox	9	2
**Scranton/Wilkes-Barre Highlanders** (Scranton/Wilkes-Barre Red Barons/RailRiders)	8	0
**Toledo Mud Hens**	8	1
**Norfolk Tides** (Tidewater Tides)	7	1
**Durham Bulls**	7	0
**Charlotte Knights**	5	1
Montreal Royals	4	1
**Indianapolis Indians**	4	0
**Jacksonville Jumbo Shrimp**	4	0
Jersey City Skeeters	3	1
Richmond Braves	3	1
Albany Senators	3	0
Newark Bears	3	0
**Nashville Sounds**	2	1
Atlanta Crackers	2	0
**Gwinnett Stripers** (Gwinnett Braves)	2	0
**Iowa Cubs**	2	0
Jersey City Giants	2	0
**Louisville Bats** (Louisville RiverBats)	2	0
Ottawa Giants (Ottawa Athletics)	2	0
Ottawa Lynx	2	0
Syracuse Stars	2	0
**Worcester Red Sox**	2	0
Arkansas Travelers	1	0
Baltimore Orioles	1	0
**Buffalo Bisons** (1979–present)	1	0
Charleston Charlies	1	0
Columbus Jets	1	0
Havana Sugar Kings	1	0
Louisville Colonels	1	0
Maine Phillies	1	0
Providence Grays	1	0
Reading Keystones	1	0
Richmond Virginians	1	0
Springfield Cubs	1	0
**Totals**	178	18

== See also ==
- List of American Association no-hitters
- List of Pacific Coast League no-hitters
