= List of Toronto Maple Leafs no-hitters =

Toronto Maple Leafs no-hitters

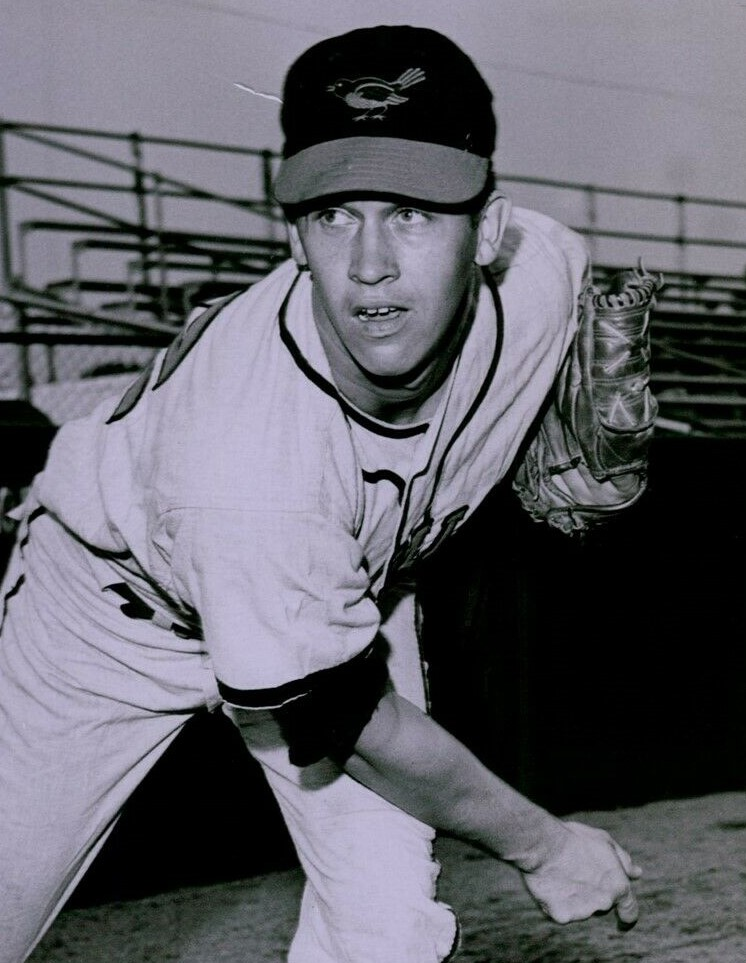
Dave Vineyard threw the Toronto Maple Leafs' final no-hitter on May 23, 1967.

The Toronto Maple Leafs Minor League Baseball team played from 1896 to 1967 in Toronto, Canada, as members of the International League (IL). In their 71-year history, the team's pitchers threw 17 no-hitters, tying them with the original Buffalo Bisons for the second-most in the IL behind the Rochester Red Wings, who have 20 no-hitters. A no-hit game occurs when a pitcher (or pitchers) allows no hits over the course of a game. A perfect game, a much rarer feat, occurs when no batters reach base by a hit or any other means, such as a walk, hit by pitch, or error.

Among the 16 pitchers who accomplished Toronto's 17 no-hitters, Augie Prudhomme stands out as the only Maple Leafs hurler to achieve this feat twice, once in 1927 and again in 1928. Dave Vineyard recorded two no-hitters for International League teams, one with the Maple Leafs in 1967 and one previously with the Red Wings in 1966. The Maple Leafs also surrendered 11 no-hitters throughout their history, including a perfect game pitched by Bill Harris in 1936.

Nine of Toronto's no-hitters occurred while the International League competed at the Double-A classification, and eight while at Triple-A, though each level was the highest level of the minors at the time. Three were pitched at the Leafs' first home ballpark, Hanlan's Point Stadium, where the team played from 1897 to 1900 and again from 1908 until 1925. Eleven were pitched at Maple Leaf Stadium, where they played from 1926 until their disbandment in 1967. Three were pitched in road games.

== No-hitters ==
Key
Score	Game score with Maple Leafs' runs listed first
Location	Stadium in italics denotes a no-hitter thrown in a home game.
Score (#)	A number following a score indicates number of innings in a game that was shorter or longer than 9 innings.
Pitcher (#)	A number following a pitcher's name indicates multiple no-hitters thrown.

No-hitters
No.	Date	Pitcher	Score	Opponent	Location	Ref.
1	July 25, 1914	Fred Herbert	15–0 (7)	Baltimore Orioles	Hanlan's Point Stadium	
2	September 10, 1915	Fred Winchell	5–1 (7) (Note: Harrisburg scored a run after Clarence Kraft walked, stole second base, advanced to third on throwing error, and came home on a fielding error in the fourth inning.)	Harrisburg Senators	Hanlan's Point Stadium	
3	July 22, 1916	Urban Shocker	1–0 (11)	Rochester Hustlers	Bay Street Ball Grounds	
4	July 29, 1924	Claude Satterfield	1–0 (7)	Jersey City Skeeters	Hanlan's Point Stadium	
5	August 23, 1927	Augie Prudhomme (1)	14–0	Reading Keystones	Maple Leaf Stadium	
6	August 22, 1928	Augie Prudhomme (2)	5–0 (7)	Jersey City Skeeters	Maple Leaf Stadium	
7	May 2, 1936	Leroy Herrmann	1–0 (10)	Newark Bears	Maple Leaf Stadium	
8	May 16, 1939	Roy Weir	8–0	Baltimore Orioles	Maple Leaf Stadium	
9	September 6, 1943	Tom Ananicz	1–0 (7)	Buffalo Bisons	Maple Leaf Stadium	
10	June 14, 1948	Oscar Judd	7–0 (7) (Note: The game was called due to rain after seven innings.)	Syracuse Chiefs	MacArthur Stadium	
11	May 7, 1949	Al Porto	5–0 (7)	Newark Bears	Maple Leaf Stadium	
12	June 5, 1956	Don Johnson	2–0 (7)	Columbus Jets	Jets Stadium	
13	June 16, 1956	Lynn Lovenguth	8–0	Richmond Virginians	Maple Leaf Stadium	
14	June 16, 1960	Frank Funk	1–0 (7)	Havana Sugar Kings	Maple Leaf Stadium	
15	September 3, 1960	Al Cicotte	1–0 (11)	Montreal Royals	Maple Leaf Stadium	
16	July 1, 1961	Rip Coleman	3–0 (7)	Richmond Virginians	Maple Leaf Stadium	
17	May 23, 1967	Dave Vineyard	2–1 (Note: Montreal scored a run after Steve Demeter walked, advanced to second base on a sacrifice, moved up to third on a throwing error, and came home on a fielder's choice in the sixth inning.)	Rochester Red Wings	Maple Leaf Stadium	

== See also ==
- List of International League no-hitters
