= List of Rochester Red Wings no-hitters =

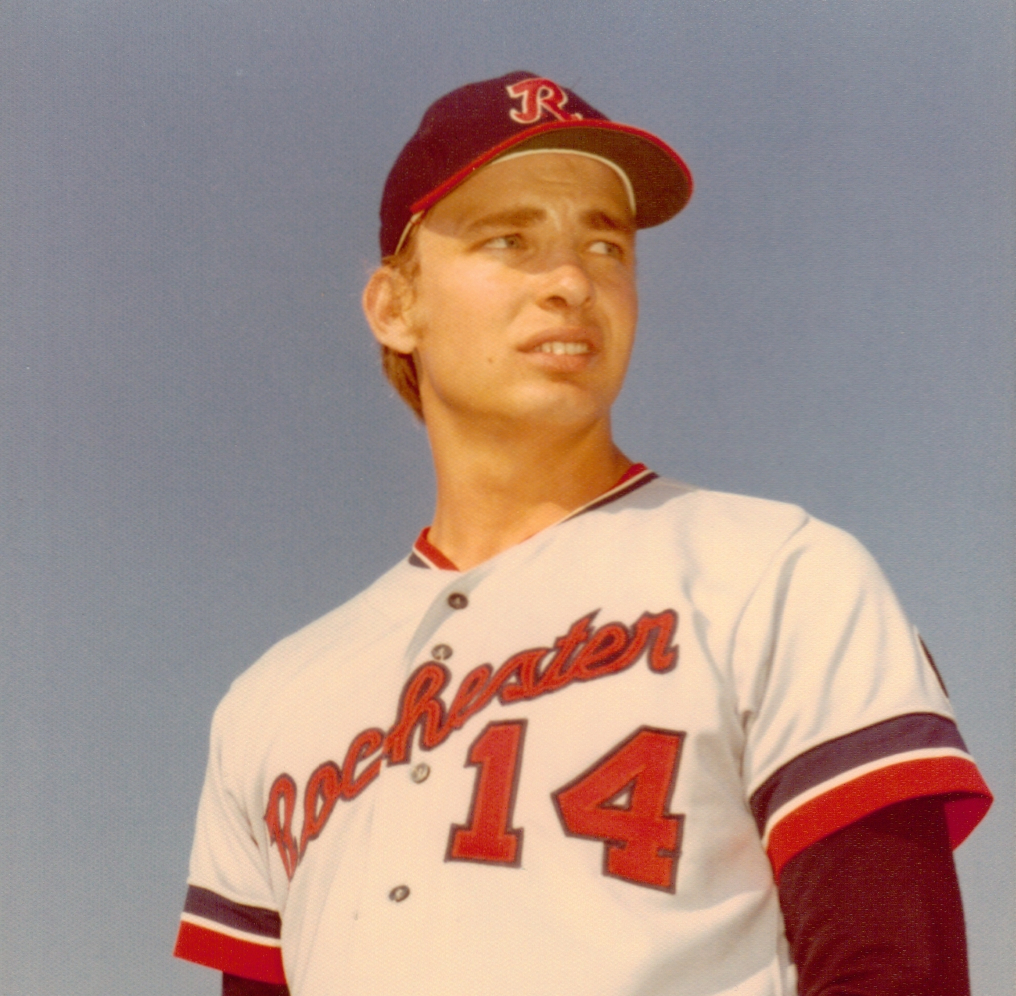
Gary Robson pitched the most recent perfect game for the Rochester Red Wings on August 16, 1974.

Since their inception in 1899, the Rochester Red Wings, a Minor League Baseball team based in Rochester, New York, have thrown twenty no-hitters, including two perfect games, the most in Minor League Baseball history. A no-hit game occurs when a pitcher (or pitchers) allows no hits over the course of a game. A perfect game, a much rarer feat, occurs when no batters reach base by a hit or any other means, such as a walk, hit by pitch, or error.

Rochester's twenty no-hitters were accomplished by a total of twenty-four pitchers. eighteen were complete games pitched by a lone pitcher, and two were combined no-hitters. Six occurred while the team was a member of the Double-A classification, and fourteen while at Triple-A, though each level was the highest level of the minors at the time. One was pitched at the Red Wings' second home ballpark, the Bay Street Ball Grounds, where the team played from 1908 to 1926. Seven was pitched at the Red Wings' third home ballpark, Silver Stadium, where the team played from 1926 to 1996. Finally, one have been pitched at Innovative Field, where they have played since 1997. Ten were pitched in road games. Two of these games were perfect although one is disputed on whether or not the game continued due to weather.

== No-hitters ==
Key
Score	Game score with no-hitter team's runs listed first
Location	Stadium in italics denotes a no-hitter thrown in a home game.
Score (#)	A number following a score indicates number of innings in a game that was shorter or longer than 9 innings.
Pitcher (#)	A number following a pitcher's name indicates multiple no-hitters thrown.
IP	Innings pitched
†	Indicates a perfect game

No-hitters
No.	Date	Pitcher(s)	Score	Opponent	Location	Ref.
1	August 11, 1914	Bill Upham^{†}	0–0 (5) (Note: The game was called due to rain in the top of the sixth inning, in which Rochester had scored a run, but the score reverted to that of the fifth. The game was scheduled to be resumed when Jersey City next visited Rochester, but it is unclear whether or not the game was played.)	Jersey City Skeeters	West Side Park	
2	September 1, 1924	Francis Karpp	8–0 (7)	Syracuse Stars	Star Park	
3	September 27, 1924	Bill Moore	4–0	Syracuse Stars	Bay Street Ball Grounds	
4	September 14, 1929	Tex Carleton	3–1 (Note: Toronto scored a run after Nolen Richardson walked and came home as the result of two fielding errors in the seventh inning.)	Toronto Maple Leafs	Maple Leaf Stadium	
5	August 20, 1941	Max Surkont	1–0 (7)	Jersey City Giants	Roosevelt Stadium	
6	August 17, 1943	Blix Donnelly	4–0	Jersey City Giants	Red Wing Stadium	
7	September 5, 1952	Jackie Collum	9–0	Ottawa Athletics	Lansdowne Park	
8	April 29, 1955	Duke Markell (2)	9–0	Columbus Jets	Red Wing Stadium	
9	July 4, 1961	Art Quirk	5–0 (7)	Syracuse Chiefs	Red Wing Stadium	
10	June 9, 1963	Natividad Martinez	5–0 (7)	Jacksonville Suns	Red Wing Stadium	
11	July 26, 1964	John Miller	2–0 (7)	Columbus Jets	Jets Stadium	
12	July 28, 1966	Dave Vineyard (1)	1–0	Toledo Mud Hens	Lucas County Stadium	
13	August 15, 1966	Tom Phoebus	1–0 (7)	Buffalo Bisons	Red Wing Stadium	
14	May 4, 1969	Marcelino López	5–1 (7) (Note: Richmond scored a run after Jack Damaska walked, advanced to third base on a fielding error, and came home on a sacrifice fly in the seventh inning.)	Richmond Braves	Parker Field	
15	May 28, 1971	Greg Arnold	6–0 (7)	Charleston Charlies	Watt Powell Stadium	
16	April 20, 1974	Wayne Garland	5–0	Charleston Charlies	Watt Powell Stadium	
17	August 16, 1974	Gary Robson^{†}	2–0 (7)	Charleston Charlies	Silver Stadium	
18	July 23, 1990	Danny Boone	2–0 (7)	Syracuse Chiefs	Silver Stadium	
19	July 6, 2011	Jeff Manship (4 IP) Jake Stevens (3 IP) Kyle Waldrop (1 IP) Jim Hoey (1 IP)	7–0	Lehigh Valley IronPigs	Frontier Field	
20	July 24, 2014 (Note: The game began on July 24 at Durham Bulls Athletic Park but was suspended due to rain in the middle of the third inning. It was resumed on August 11 at Rochester's Frontier Field.)	Trevor May (3 IP) Logan Darnell (6 IP)	3–0	Durham Bulls	Durham Bulls Athletic Park; Frontier Field	

== See also ==
- List of International League no-hitters
