= List of Scranton/Wilkes-Barre Highlanders no-hitters =

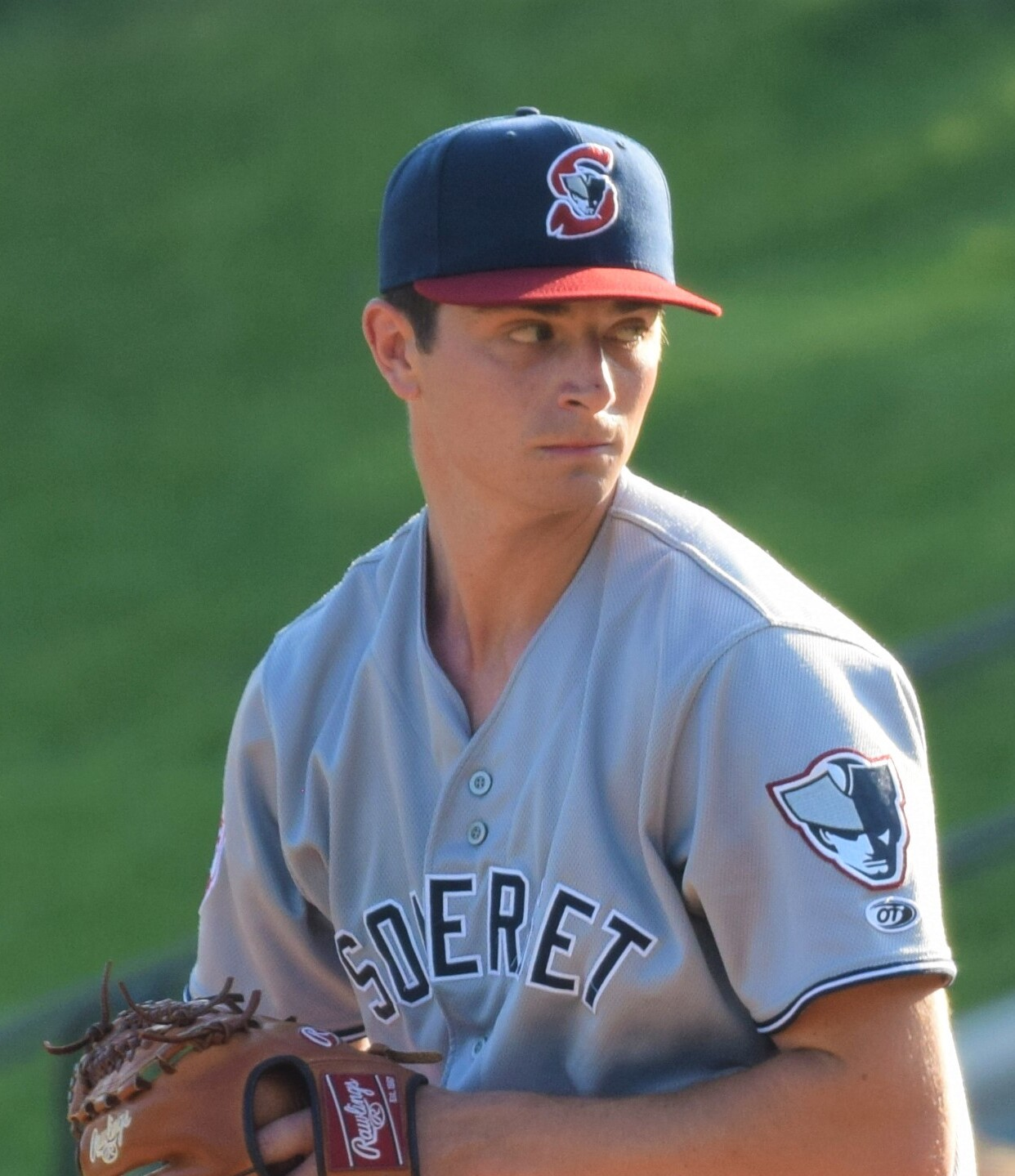
Sean Boyle threw the most recent no-hitter for the RailRiders on August 19, 2021.

The Scranton/Wilkes-Barre Highlanders Minor League Baseball team began play in 1989 in Moosic, Pennsylvania, as members of the International League (IL). The team's pitchers have thrown seven no-hitters, including one combined no-hitter, placing them eighth in IL history. A no-hit game occurs when a pitcher (or pitchers) allows no hits throughout a game. A perfect game, a much rarer feat, occurs when no batters reach base by a hit or any other means, such as a walk, hit by pitch, or error.

Among the six pitchers who accomplished Scranton's seven no-hitters, Jeremy Cummings stands out as the first Highlanders hurler to throw a complete nine innings of no-hit baseball and the only one to accomplish it as a starter, on September 3, 2006. All of Scranton's no-hitters occurred in the International League at the Triple-A level. Five were pitched at their home ballpark, PNC Field, where the team has played since 1989, while the remaining two were recorded in road games. The Highlanders vhave also been on the losing side of a no-hitter twice both by the Durham Bulls. On April 26, 2014, Mike Montgomery and Brad Boxberger of the Bulls combined to no-hit Scranton/Wilkes-Barre, and on April 19, 2025, when Joe Boyle, Cole Sulser, Jacob Waguespack combined to no-hit them at Durham Bulls Athletic Park.

== No-hitters ==
Key
Score	Game score with RailRiders' runs listed first
Location	Stadium in italics denotes a no-hitter thrown in a home game.
Score (#)	A number following a score indicates number of innings in a game that was shorter or longer than 9 innings.
Pitcher (#)	A number following a pitcher's name indicates multiple no-hitters thrown.

No-hitters
No.	Date	Pitcher	Score	Opponent	Location	Ref.
1	May 25, 1990	Wally Ritchie	1–0 (8) (Note: Ritchie allowed no hits through seven innings in the seven-inning doubleheader before allowing a hit in the eighth.)	Syracuse Chiefs	Lackawanna County Stadium	
2	July 25, 1992	Ben Rivera	2–0 (7)	Pawtucket Red Sox	Lackawanna County Stadium	
3	July 4, 1993	Tyler Green	3–1 (7) (Note: Ottawa scored a run after Curtis Pride walked, advanced to third base on a wild pickoff throw, and came home on a sacrifice fly in the fourth inning.)	Ottawa Lynx	Lackawanna County Stadium	
4	June 6, 2004	Robert Ellis	1–0 (7)	Louisville Bats	Lackawanna County Stadium	
5	September 3, 2006	Jeremy Cummings	5–0	Rochester Red Wings	Frontier Field	
6	July 21, 2021	Luis Gil (6 IP) Reggie McClain (2 IP) Stephen Ridings (1 IP)	8–0	Rochester Red Wings	PNC Field	
7	August 19, 2021	Sean Boyle	5–0 (7)	Worcester Red Sox	Polar Park	

== See also ==
- List of International League no-hitters
