= Georgia Bulldogs baseball =

Baseball team of the University of Georgia

- 2027 Georgia Bulldogs baseball team
- Founded: 1886; 140 years ago
- Overall record: 2,502–1,889–24 (.569)
- University: University of Georgia
- Athletic director: Josh Brooks
- Head coach: Wes Johnson (3rd season)
- Conference: SEC
- Location: Athens, Georgia
- Home stadium: Foley Field (capacity: 3,633)
- Nickname: Bulldogs
- Colors: Red and black

College World Series champions
- 1990

College World Series runner-up
- 2008

College World Series appearances
- 1987, 1990, 2001, 2004, 2006, 2008, 2026

NCAA regional champions
- 1987, 1990, 2001, 2004, 2006, 2008, 2024, 2026

NCAA tournament appearances
- 1953, 1954, 1987, 1990, 1992, 2001, 2002, 2004, 2006, 2008, 2009, 2011, 2018, 2019, 2022, 2024, 2025, 2026

Conference tournament champions
- 2026

Conference regular season champions
- 1908, 1914, 1919, 1933, 1953, 1954, 1987, 2001, 2004, 2008, 2026

The Georgia Bulldogs baseball team represents the University of Georgia in NCAA Division I college baseball. The team participates in the Southeastern Conference. The Bulldogs are currently coached by Wes Johnson and play their home games at Foley Field. They have competed in the College World Series seven times, with their first and only national championship coming in 1990.

== History ==
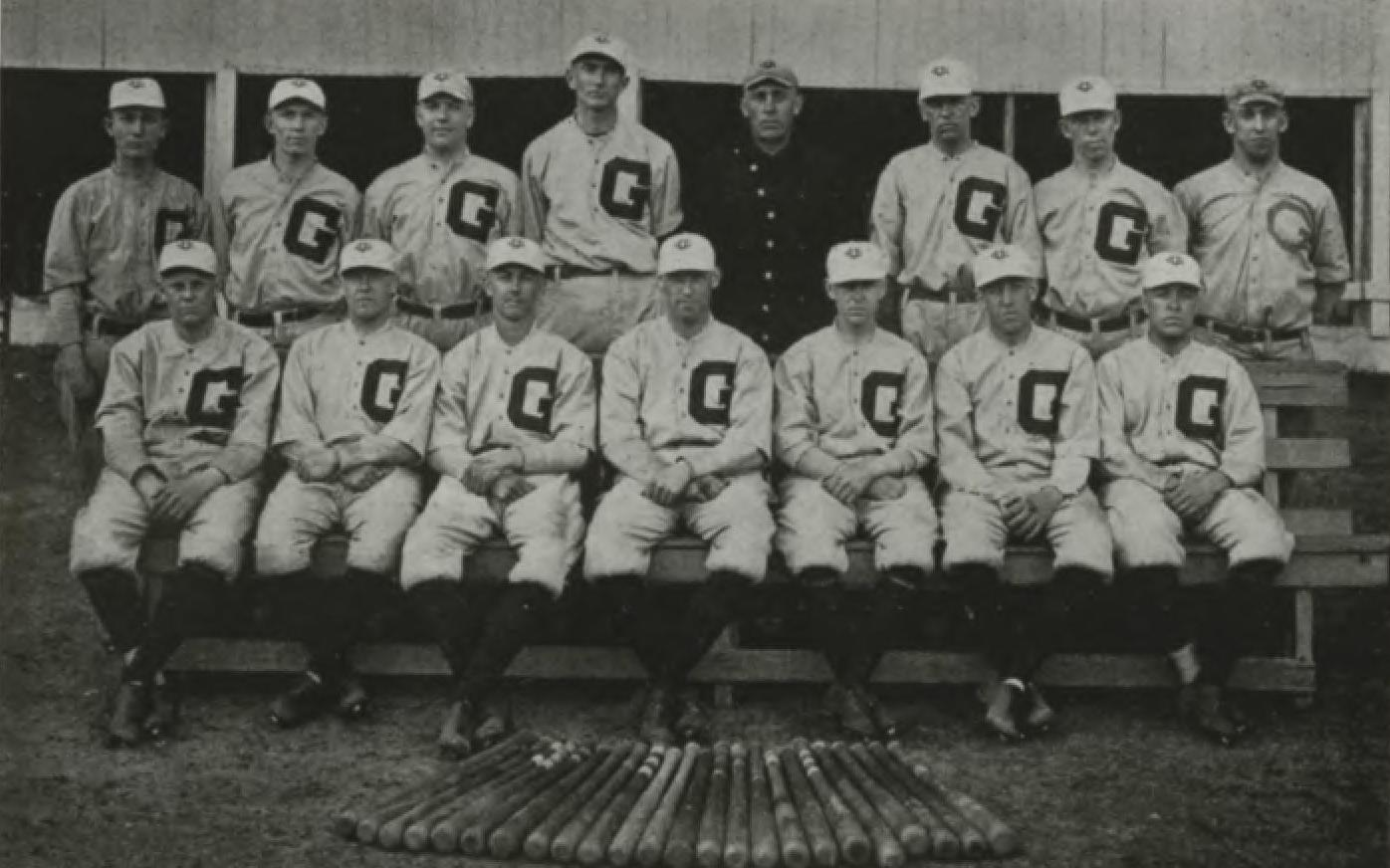
Georgia team of 1920

The Georgia Baseball team has seen most of its success in recent years, including winning the 1990 College World Series, as well as making the trip to the College World Series in 1987, 1990, 2001, 2004, 2006, 2008, and 2026.

In its history, the team has claimed eight Southeastern Conference regular season conference titles, in 1933, 1953, 1954, 1987, 2001, 2004, 2008, and 2026. The Bulldogs have won the SEC baseball tournament once in 2026.

The program dates back to 1886 and, according to former Sports Information Director Dan Magill, was once the most popular sport on campus. However, from the mid-1950s to the late-1980s, and then through most of the 1990s, there were only scattered bright spots as the team managed only a modicum of success.

Since 2001, however, the program has enjoyed quite a resurgence, winning three championships in the perennial stalwart Southeastern Conference and participating in the College World Series four times in those eight seasons.

The Georgia-Georgia Tech baseball rivalry is one of the South's most fierce, and the teams' annual Spring Baseball Classic at Truist Park draws some of the largest crowds in college baseball (the 2004 game was seen by 28,836 spectators, the second-largest crowd in college baseball history).

== Head coaches ==
The Bulldogs have had 26 head coaches in the history of their baseball program: Current head coach Wes Johnson has earned SEC Coach of the Year honors.

Records through the 2026 season.

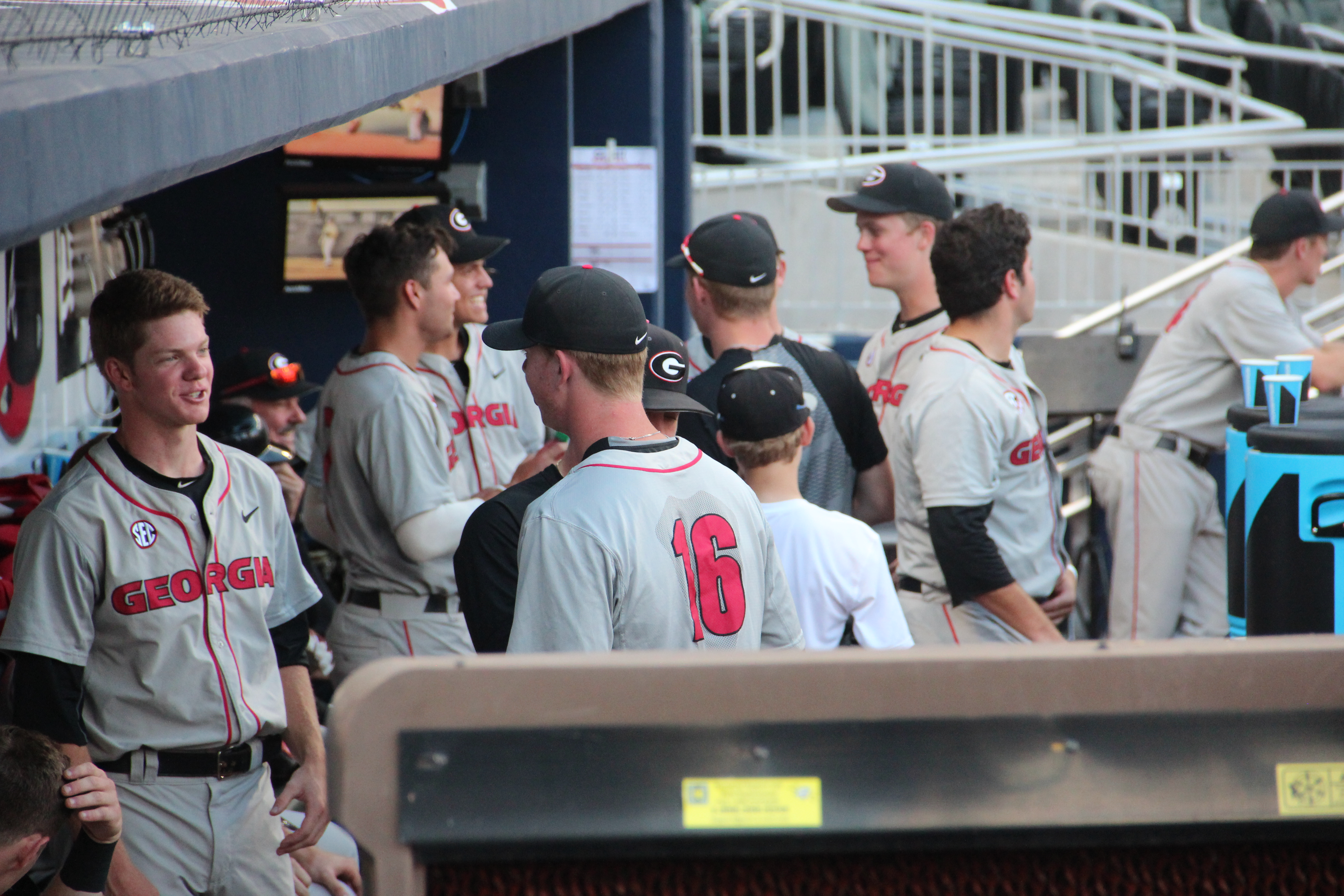
The 2017 UGA baseball team prior to a game against Georgia Tech in SunTrust Park

	Coach	Seasons	Wins	Losses	Ties	Win %
26	Wes Johnson	2024–present	139	48	0	.743
25	Scott Stricklin	2014–23	299	236	1	.557
24	David Perno	2002–13	390	333	1	.544
23	Ron Polk	2000–01	79	48	0	.622
22	Robert Sapp	1997–99	77	87	1	.467
21	Steve Webber	1981–96	500	403	1	.553
20	Roy Umstattd	1976–80	130	100	1	.562
19	Nolen Richardson	1951	12	13	0	.480
18	Jim Whatley	1950, 1952–75	336	327	3	.504
17	Charley Trippi	1948–49	34	18	0	.654
16	J. B. Whitworth	1943	1	10	0	.091
15	J. V. Sikes	1938–42, 1946–47	98	63	1	.605
14	Vernon Smith	1934–37	30	45	0	.400
13	W. P. White	1921–33	224	100	7	.677
12	Herman Stegeman	1919–20	31	13	2	.674
11	Glenn Colby	1918	0	0	0	.000
10	J. G. Henderson	1917	0	0	0	.000
9	Joe Bean	1914-16	33	16	1	.660
8	Frank B. Anderson	1910-13	51	16	3	.729
7	W. J. Lewis	1909	0	0	0	.000
6	Hammond Johnson	1908	20	2	0	.909
5	Tommy Stouch	1906-07	12	9	0	.571
4	William A. Reynolds	1902-03	13	9	1	.565
3	Marvin D. Dickinson	1901, 04-05	18	14	0	.563
2	Hughie Jennings	1895-97	5	17	0	.227
1	C. E. Morris	1886	2	0	0	1.000

== Championships ==
=== National championships ===
Year	Coach	Record	Result
1990	Steve Webber	52–19	Beat Oklahoma State, 2–1
Total National Championships: 1

=== College World Series appearances ===
Year	Coach	Record	Result
1987	Steve Webber	42–21	4–1 in Northeast Regional, 0–2 in CWS
1990	Steve Webber	52–19	4–1 in Northeast Regional, 4–1 in CWS, National champions
2001	Ron Polk	47–22	4–1 in Athens Regional, 2–1 in Athens Super Regional, 0–2 in CWS
2004	David Perno	45–23	3–1 in Athens Regional, 2–0 in Atlanta Super Regional, 2–2 in CWS
2006	David Perno	47–23	4–1 in Athens Regional, 2–1 in Atlanta Super Regional, 0–2 in CWS
2008	David Perno	45–25–1	4–1 in Athens Regional, 2–1 in Athens Super Regional, 4–2 in CWS
2026	Wes Johnson	53–14	3–0 in Athens Regional, 2–0 in Athens Super Regional, 2–2 in CWS
Total College World Series appearances: 7

=== SEC regular season championships ===
Season	Coach	Overall record	SEC record
1933	W. P. White	12–3–1	8–1
1953	Jim Whatley	23–5	12–4
1954	Jim Whatley	16–9	11–4
1987 (Note: Georgia claims the 1987 SEC regular-season championship, having finished with the conference's best regular-season record. However, the Southeastern Conference does not officially recognize Georgia as the 1987 SEC champion, as the conference championship was awarded to the winner of the SEC Tournament, which was won by Mississippi State.)	Steve Webber	42–21	18–10
2001	Ron Polk	47–22	20–10
2004	David Perno	45–23	19–11
2008	David Perno	45–25–1	20–9–1
2026	Wes Johnson	53–14	23–7
SEC regular season championships: 8

=== SEC Tournament championships ===
Season	Coach	Opponent	Score	Site	Overall record	SEC record	Tournament record
2026	Wes Johnson	Arkansas	11–1^{7}	Hoover, AL	53–14	23–7	3–0
SEC Tournament championships: 1

== Player awards ==
=== National awards ===
- Baseball America Player of the Year Award

Derek Lilliquist (1983)

- Baseball America Freshman of the Year Award

Ron Wenrich (1985)

- Golden Spikes Award

Charlie Condon (2024)
Daniel Jackson (2026)

- Dick Howser Trophy

Charlie Condon (2024)
Daniel Jackson (2026)

=== SEC Awards ===
- Pitcher of the Year

Joshua Fields (2008)

- Player of the Year Award

Gordon Beckham (2008)
Charlie Condon (2024)
Daniel Jackson (2026)

- Southeastern Conference Freshman of the Year

Charlie Condon (2023)

== Georgia's 1st Team All-Americans ==
Player	Position	Year(s)	Selectors
Derek Lilliquist	Starting Pitcher	1987†	ABCA, BA
Josh Morris	First Base	2006	College Baseball Foundation
Joshua Fields	Starting Pitcher	2008	CB, NCBWA
Gordon Beckham	Shortstop	2008†	ABCA, BA, CB, NCBWA
Rich Poythress	Designated Hitter	2009	BA
Aaron Schunk	Utility	2019	BA
Jack Gowen	Relief Pitcher	2022	College Baseball Foundation, NCBWA
Charlie Condon	Third Baseman	2023, 2024†	ABCA, BA, CB, D1, NCBWA (2023, 2024), PG
Robbie Burnett	Outfielder	2025	NCBWA
Ryland Zaborowski	Designated Hitter	2025	ABCA, NCBWA, PG
Daniel Jackson	Catcher/Designated Hitter	2026†	ABCA, BA, CB, D1, NCBWA, PG
Tre Phelps	Third Baseman	2026	ABCA, College Baseball Foundation, NCBWA
Source:"SEC All-Americas". secsports.com. Archived from the original on May 28, 2008. ABCA: American Baseball Coaches Association BA: Baseball America CB: Collegiate Baseball D1: D1Baseball.com NCBWA: National Collegiate Baseball Writers Association PG: Perfect Game † Denotes consensus All-American

== Bulldogs in Major League Baseball ==
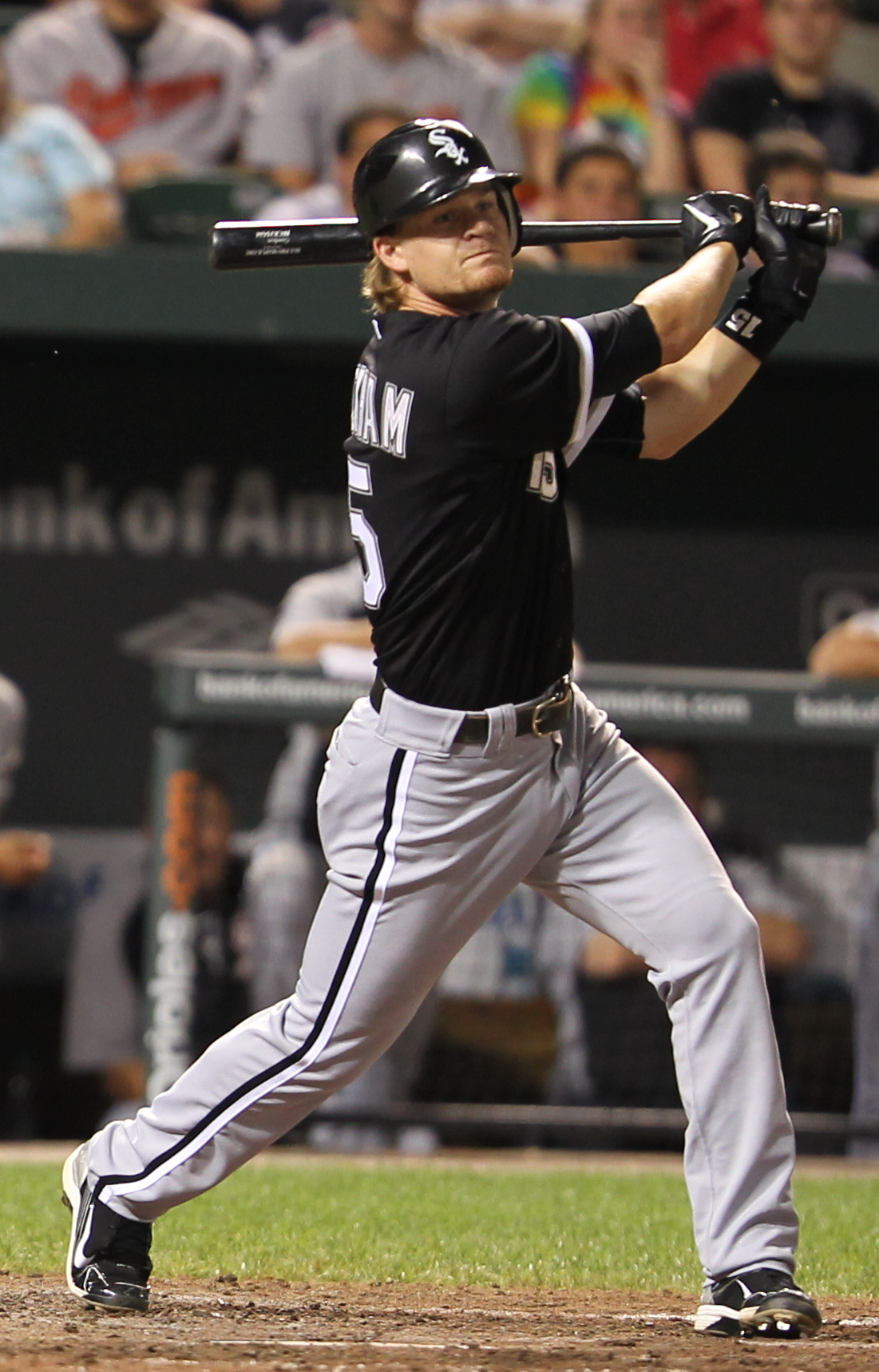
Former Bulldog Gordon Beckham

Fifty-three former players have gone on to play at the Major League level, including five active players:

- Jonathan Cannon, pitcher, Chicago White Sox
- Kyle Farmer, shortstop, Atlanta Braves
- Emerson Hancock, pitcher, Seattle Mariners
- Aaron Schunk, third baseman, Atlanta Braves
- Jared Walsh, first baseman, Chicago White Sox

Other notable former players include:

- Alf Anderson (1941–1946) – shortstop, Pittsburgh Pirates
- Gordon Beckham (2009–2019), second baseman, Chicago White Sox, Los Angeles Angels, Atlanta Braves, San Francisco Giants, Seattle Mariners, Detroit Tigers
- Marty Brown (1988–1990) – third baseman, Cincinnati Reds, Baltimore Orioles
- Mitchell Boggs (2008–2013) - pitcher, St. Louis Cardinals
- Cris Carpenter (1988–1996) – pitcher, St. Louis Cardinals, Florida Marlins, Texas Rangers, Milwaukee Brewers
- Spud Chandler (1937–1947) – pitcher, New York Yankees
- Glenn Davis (1984–1993) – first baseman, Houston Astros, Baltimore Orioles
- Claud Derrick (1910–1914) – shortstop, Philadelphia Athletics, New York Yankees, Cincinnati Reds, Chicago Cubs
- Hal Epps (1938–1944) – outfielder, St. Louis Cardinals, St. Louis Browns, Philadelphia Athletics
- Josh Fields (2013–2018) – pitcher, Houston Astros, Los Angeles Dodgers
- Jack Fisher (1959–1969) – pitcher, Baltimore Orioles, San Francisco Giants, New York Mets, Chicago White Sox, Cincinnati Reds
- Dave Fleming (1991–1995) – pitcher, Seattle Mariners, Kansas City Royals
- Justin Grimm (2012–2022) – pitcher, Texas Rangers, Chicago Cubs, Kansas City Royals, Seattle Mariners, Milwaukee Brewers, Oakland Athletics
- Robby Hammock (2003–2011) – catcher, Arizona Diamondbacks
- Ken Holloway (1922–1930) – pitcher, Detroit Tigers, Cleveland Indians, New York Yankees
- Jeff Keppinger (2004-2013) – infielder, New York Mets, Kansas City Royals, Cincinnati Reds, Houston Astros, San Francisco Giants, Tampa Bay Rays, Chicago White Sox
- Zac Kristofak (2024) – pitcher, Los Angeles Angels
- Derek Lilliquist (1989–1996) – pitcher, Atlanta Braves, San Diego Padres, Cleveland Indians, Boston Red Sox, Cincinnati Reds
- Cy Moore (1929–1934) – pitcher, Brooklyn Robins/Dodgers, Philadelphia Phillies
- Jim Nash (1966–1972) – pitcher, Kansas City/Oakland Athletics, Atlanta Braves, Philadelphia Phillies
- Brian Powell (1998–2004) – pitcher, Detroit Tigers, Houston Astros, San Francisco Giants, Philadelphia Phillies
- Nolen Richardson (1929–1939) – third baseman, Detroit Tigers, New York Yankees, Cincinnati Reds
- Johnny Riddle (1930–1948) – catcher, Chicago White Sox, Washington Senators, Boston Braves, Cincinnati Reds, Pittsburgh Pirates
- Johnny Rucker (1940–1946) – outfielder, New York Giants
- Clint Sammons (2007–2009) – catcher, Atlanta Braves
- Tully Sparks (1897–1910) – pitcher, Philadelphia Phillies, Pittsburgh Pirates, Milwaukee Brewers, New York Giants, Boston Americans
- Jeff Treadway (1987–1995) – second baseman, Cincinnati Reds, Atlanta Braves, Cleveland Indians, Los Angeles Dodgers, Montreal Expos
- Jim Umbricht (1959–1963) – pitcher, Pittsburgh Pirates, Houston Colt .45s
- Mark Watson (2000–2003) – pitcher, Cleveland Indians, Seattle Mariners, Cincinnati Reds
- Alex Wood (2013–2024) – pitcher, Atlanta Braves, Los Angeles Dodgers, Cincinnati Reds, San Francisco Giants, Oakland Athletics

== See also ==
- List of NCAA Division I baseball programs
