= Rip Jordan =

American baseball player (1889–1960)

- Pitcher
- Born: September 28, 1889; Portland, Maine, U.S.
- Died: June 5, 1960 (aged 70); Meriden, Connecticut, U.S.
- Batted: Left Threw: Right

MLB debut
- June 25, 1912, for the Chicago White Sox

Last MLB appearance
- September 27, 1919, for the Washington Senators

MLB statistics
- Win–loss record: 0–0
- Earned run average: 6.61
- Strikeouts: 3
- Stats at Baseball Reference

Teams
- Chicago White Sox (1912); Washington Senators (1919)

Raymond Willis "Rip" Jordan (September 28, 1889 – June 5, 1960), nicknamed "Lanky", was an American pitcher in Major League Baseball. He played for the Chicago White Sox and Washington Senators. Jordan was 6 feet tall and weighed 172 pounds.

== Career ==
Jordan was born in Portland, Maine, in 1889. He started his professional baseball career in 1912 as a member of the American League's Chicago White Sox. That year, he made four relief appearances, pitching a total of 12.1 innings and allowing seven earned runs.

Jordan went down to the minors in 1913 and played for the Western League's Lincoln club for two seasons. He pitched over 200 innings during both campaigns. After winning 10 games in 1914, he went to the New England League's Portland Duffs for a season and went 11–6. Jordan then joined the New York State League's Elmira Colonels. He went a combined 19–28 over two seasons there.

In 1919, Jordan started off with the Buffalo Bisons of the class AA International League. He had arguably his best season for them, going 15–10 with a 1.43 earned run average and setting a career-high in victories. That fall, Jordan made it to the major leagues for the second time, when he started a game for the Washington Senators on September 27. Pitching against the Boston Red Sox, he lasted four innings and gave up five earned runs to take a no-decision. Boston outfielder Babe Ruth set a Major League Baseball record that year by hitting 29 home runs, and the last one came off of Jordan.

Jordan never pitched in the majors after 1919. In 1920, he moved west to join the Pacific Coast League's San Francisco Seals and went 5–13 with a 5.08 ERA. He finished his playing career the following season in the Texas League.

Jordan was a baseball manager in 1946, when he ran the New England League's Portland Gulls. He died in Meriden, Connecticut, in 1960 at age 70
