= Fred Herbert (baseball) =

American baseball player (1887–1963)

- Pitcher
- Born: March 4, 1887; La Grange, Illinois
- Died: May 29, 1963 (aged 76); Tice, Florida
- Batted: Right Threw: Right

MLB debut
- September 25, 1915, for the New York Giants

Last MLB appearance
- September 29, 1915, for the New York Giants

MLB statistics
- Win–loss record: 1–1
- Earned run average: 1.06
- Strikeouts: 6
- Stats at Baseball Reference

Teams
- New York Giants (1915)

Frederick Herbert (March 4, 1887 – May 29, 1963) was a pitcher in Major League Baseball who made two starts for the 1915 New York Giants.
