= Tex Carleton =

American baseball player (1906–1977)

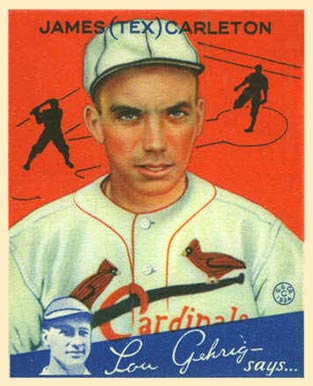
- Pitcher
- Born: August 19, 1906; Comanche, Texas, U.S.
- Died: January 11, 1977 (aged 70); Fort Worth, Texas, U.S.
- Batted: Switch Threw: Right

MLB debut
- April 17, 1932, for the St. Louis Cardinals

Last MLB appearance
- September 23, 1940, for the Brooklyn Dodgers

MLB statistics
- Win–loss record: 100–76
- Earned run average: 3.91
- Strikeouts: 808
- Stats at Baseball Reference

Teams
- St. Louis Cardinals (1932–1934); Chicago Cubs (1935–1938); Brooklyn Dodgers (1940)

Career highlights and awards
- World Series champion (1934); Pitched a no-hitter on April 30, 1940

James Otto "Tex" Carleton (August 19, 1906 – January 11, 1977) was an American Major League Baseball pitcher from 1932 to 1940 for the St. Louis Cardinals, Chicago Cubs, and Brooklyn Dodgers. Carleton threw a no-hitter on April 30, 1940, against the Reds when he was with the Dodgers. Only a year earlier he had been sold down to the minors and released. His career marks were 100 wins, 76 losses and a 3.90 earned run average.

As a hitter, Carleton had the exact number of hits (100) as wins in his major league career. He posted a .185 batting average (100-for-540) with 47 runs, 6 home runs, 54 RBI and drawing 35 bases on balls.

== See also ==
- List of Major League Baseball no-hitters

Achievements
Preceded by Bob Feller	No-hitter pitcher April 30, 1940	Succeeded by Lon Warneke
