= Duke Markell =

French baseball player (1923-1984)

- Pitcher
- Born: August 17, 1923; Paris, France
- Died: June 14, 1984 (aged 60); Fort Lauderdale, Florida, U.S.
- Batted: Right Threw: Right

MLB debut
- September 6, 1951, for the St. Louis Browns

Last MLB appearance
- September 29, 1951, for the St. Louis Browns

MLB statistics
- Win–loss record: 1–1
- Earned run average: 6.33
- Innings pitched: 21 1/3
- Stats at Baseball Reference

Teams
- St. Louis Browns (1951)

Harry Duquesne "Duke" Markell (born Henri Duquesne Makowski, August 17, 1923 – June 14, 1984) was a French-born American professional baseball player, a pitcher whose career extended from 1945–1957, almost exclusively in minor league baseball. He appeared in five Major League games for the St. Louis Browns in the closing weeks of the 1951 season.

Born in Paris, France, he moved to The Bronx, New York City with his family when he was seven years old. Markell stood 6 feet 1 inch (1.85 m) tall and weighed 209 pounds (95 kg). He was Jewish.

== Baseball career ==
Markell was in his seventh pro season when the Browns gave him his MLB opportunity. Although he had lost 19 games that summer for the Oklahoma City Indians of the Double-A Texas League, he had compiled a good 2.77 earned run average.

Markell earned both of his Major League decisions in his two starting assignments. In his first, on September 16 at Shibe Park, he allowed seven hits (including home runs by Gus Zernial and Eddie Joost) and seven earned runs to take the loss in a 7–1 victory by the Philadelphia Athletics. In his second start on September 27, however, he threw a complete game, 7–4 victory over the Detroit Tigers at Sportsman's Park, outpitching veteran Tiger right-hander Fred Hutchinson. Although he gave up another homer, this time to Johnny Groth, Markell scattered eight hits and only three runs were earned.

Altogether, he gave up 25 hits and 20 bases on balls, striking out ten, in 21 1/3 innings of big league action. After his brief trial with the Browns, Markell returned to the minor leagues, where he appeared in 508 games pitched and compiled a 154–142 record.

In the early 1960s, the retired Jewish former major league baseball pitcher played outfield for The Free Sons of Israel lodge softball team "Mt. Horeb." He was a regular on the team which played on the Randall's Island softball fields in New York City. He died in Fort Lauderdale, Florida at the age of 60 in 1984.
