= Bill Moore (pitcher) =

American baseball player (1902–1984)

- Pitcher
- Born: September 3, 1902; Corning, New York
- Died: January 24, 1984 (aged 81); Corning, New York
- Batted: Right Threw: Right

MLB debut
- April 15, 1925, for the Detroit Tigers

Last MLB appearance
- April 15, 1925, for the Detroit Tigers

MLB statistics
- Batters faced: 3
- Earned runs allowed: 2
- Earned run average: ∞
- Stats at Baseball Reference

Teams
- Detroit Tigers (1925)

William Christopher Moore (September 3, 1902 – January 24, 1984) was a Major League Baseball pitcher who played in one game for the Detroit Tigers on April 15, 1925. He faced three batters, and allowed three base on balls and two earned runs.
