= Al Porto =

American baseball player (1926-2005)

- Pitcher
- Born: June 27, 1926; Heilwood, Pennsylvania, U.S.
- Died: July 6, 2005 (aged 79); Lancaster, California, U.S.
- Batted: Left Threw: Left

MLB debut
- April 22, 1948, for the Philadelphia Phillies

Last MLB appearance
- May 2, 1948, for the Philadelphia Phillies

MLB statistics
- Win–loss record: 0–0
- Earned run average: 0.00
- Strikeouts: 1
- Stats at Baseball Reference

Teams
- Philadelphia Phillies (1948)

Alfred "Al" Porto (June 27, 1926 – July 6, 2005), nicknamed "Lefty", was an American Major League Baseball pitcher who played in 1948 with the Philadelphia Phillies.
