= Sean Boyle =

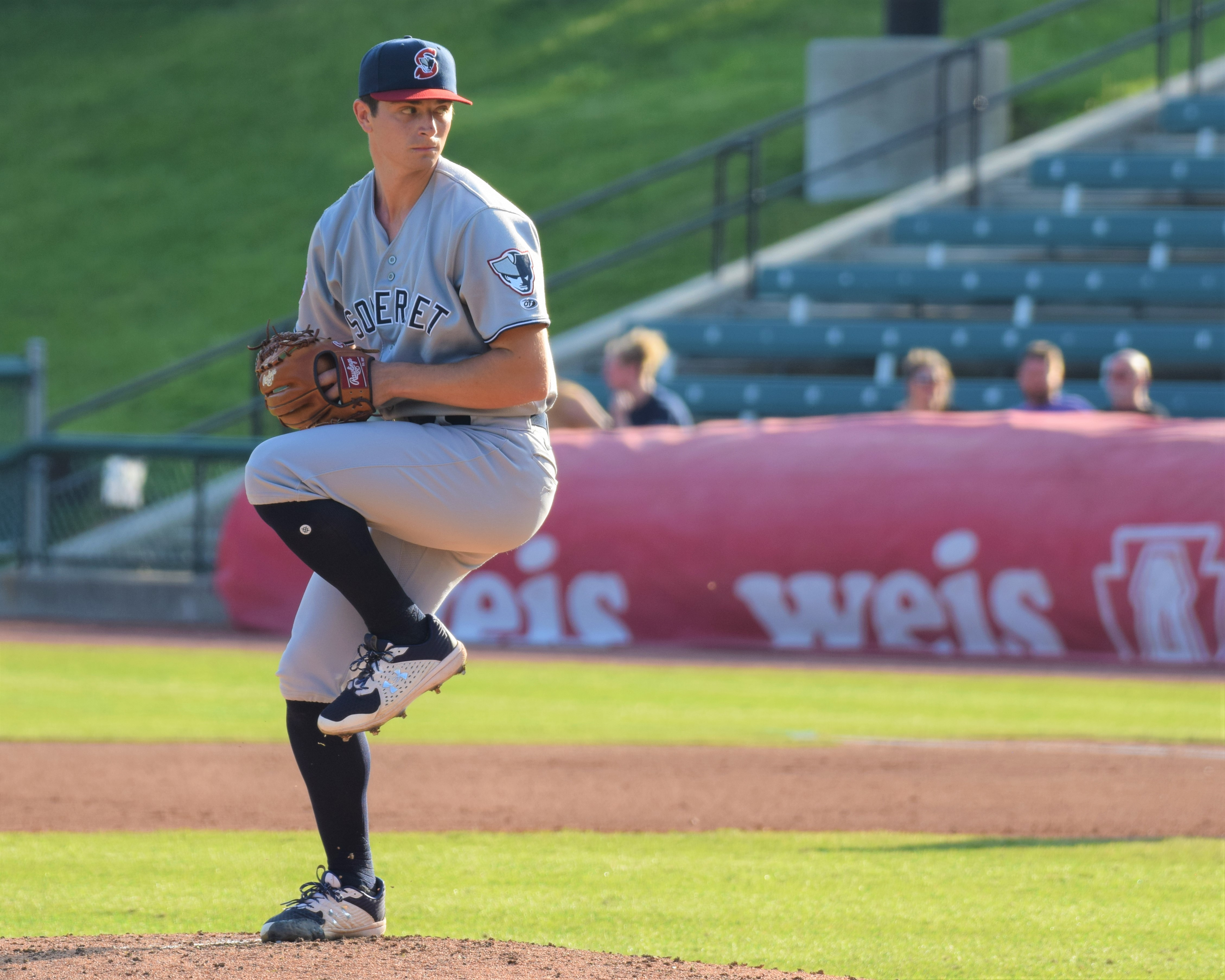
- Boyle in 2022 with the Somerset Patriots

Free agent
- Pitcher
- Born: October 29, 1996 (age 30); Selden, New York, U.S.
- Bats: Right Throws: Right

Sean Boyle (born October 29, 1996) is an American professional baseball pitcher who is a free agent.

== Amateur career ==
Boyle grew up in Selden, New York and attended Newfield High School. He did not play baseball until his junior year at Newfield. Boyle began his college baseball career at Suffolk County Community College, playing for two seasons before transferring to Dallas Baptist University. As a senior for the Dallas Baptist Patriots, Boyle made 21 appearances with two starts and went 1–1 with a 3.60 ERA and 40 strikeouts over 35 innings pitched.

== Professional career ==
The New York Yankees selected Boyle in the 25th round of the 2018 Major League Baseball draft. He signed with the team and received a $10,000 signing bonus. After signing with the team Boyle was assigned to the Gulf Coast League Yankees as a reliever and struck out 20 batters over 15 innings pitched.

Boyle began the 2019 season with the Pulaski Yankees before earning a promotion to the Low-A Staten Island Yankees after posting a 1.88 ERA with 32 strikeouts in 28 2/3 innings pitched. He did not play in a game in 2020 due to the cancellation of the minor league season because of the COVID-19 pandemic.

Boyle began the 2021 season with the Low-A Tampa Tarpons, where he began to transition from a reliever to a starter before being promoted to the High-A Hudson Valley Renegades where in his first start, threw a combined no-hitter for Hudson Valley Renegades, their first in 20 years. He then was promoted to the Triple-A Scranton/Wilkes-Barre RailRiders. where in his first start in Triple-A, threw a complete game no-hitter against the Worcester Red Sox. Boyle was named aa the Triple-A International League pitcher of the week for the week of September 22. Boyle had risen through four levels of the minor leagues in 2021 and threw two no-hitters that year. Boyle was later assigned to the Double-A Somerset Patriots before being assigned back to Scranton/Wilkes-Barre.

To begin 2022, Boyle pitched two innings in a March 20 Yankees spring training game, allowing no runs. He was assigned to Double-A Somerset in order to get more innings for his continued conversion to a full-time starting pitcher. Boyle was named the Eastern League Pitcher of the Week for July 17 and Eastern League of the Month for July. He was also named 2022 Pitcher of the year voted by Somerset fans. Boyle had a record 10 straight quality starts at Double-A Somerset, the longest streak by any minor leaguer since 2019 before he was promoted to Scranton/Wilkes-Barre at the beginning of August. In 2022, Boyle ranked second of all minor league pitchers with 155 1/3 innings pitched, third with 13 wins, and fourth with 160 strikeouts.

Boyle made 28 appearances (23 starts) for Triple-A Scranton/Wilkes-Barre in 2025, compiling a 9–9 record and 4.61 ERA with 120 strikeouts across 134 2/3 innings pitched. He elected free agency following the season on November 6, 2025.

On November 26, 2025, Boyle signed a minor league contract with the San Diego Padres. He elected free agency on November 2, 2026.
