= Art Quirk =

American baseball player (1938-2014)

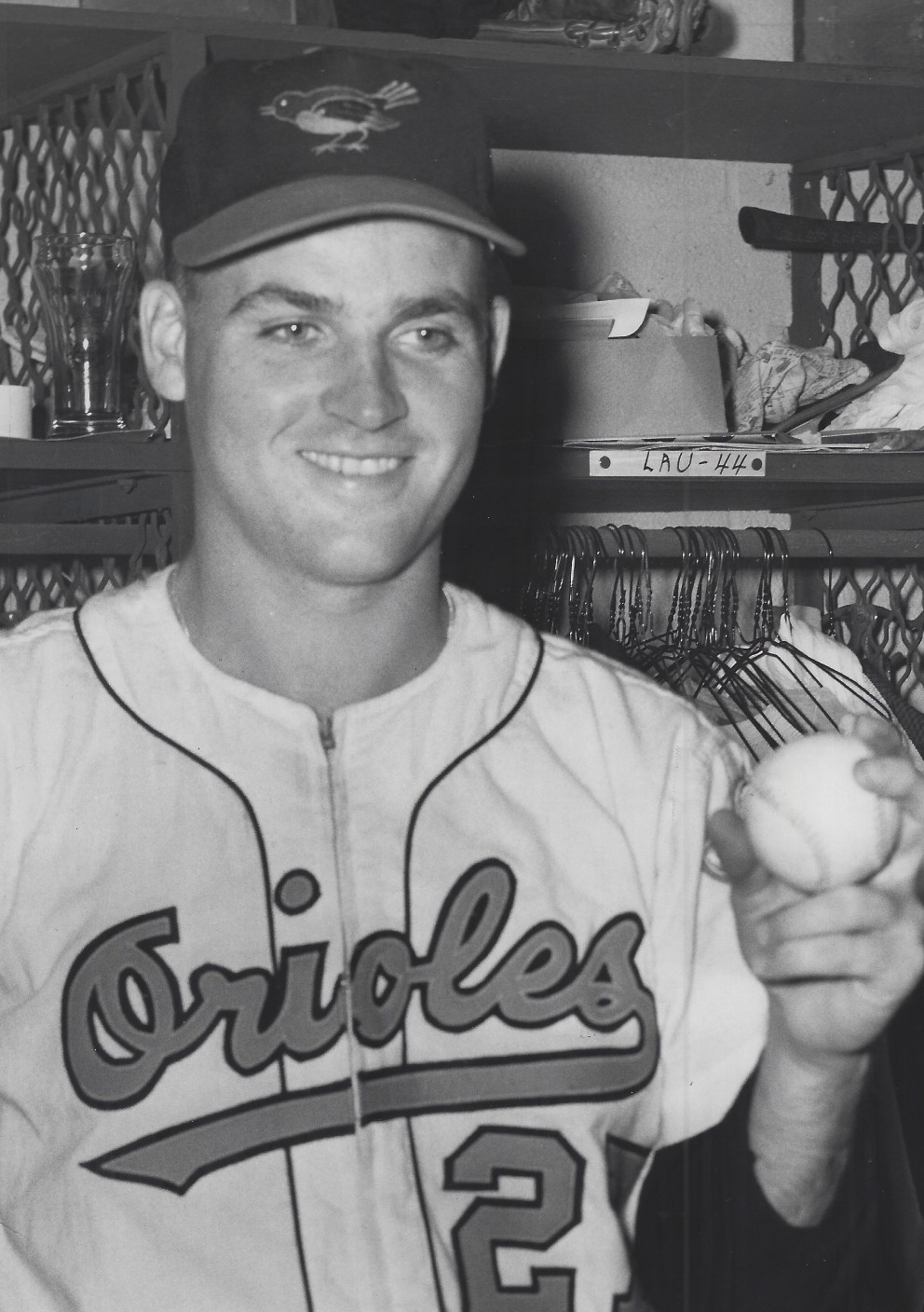
- Quick in 1962
- Pitcher
- Born: April 11, 1938; Providence, Rhode Island, U.S.
- Died: November 22, 2014 (aged 76); Stonington, Connecticut, U.S.
- Batted: Right Threw: Left

MLB debut
- April 17, 1962, for the Baltimore Orioles

Last MLB appearance
- May 22, 1963, for the Washington Senators

MLB statistics
- Win–loss record: 3–2
- Earned run average: 5.21
- Strikeouts: 30
- Stats at Baseball Reference

Teams
- Baltimore Orioles (1962); Washington Senators (1963)

Arthur Lincoln Quirk Jr. (April 11, 1938 – November 22, 2014) was an American professional baseball left-handed pitcher in Major League Baseball (MLB) who played two seasons for the Baltimore Orioles and the Washington Senators.

== Amateur career ==
A native of Providence, Rhode Island, Quirk attended Dartmouth College and graduated in 1959, after leading the Dartmouth Big Green baseball team pitching stats in the 1958 and 1959 seasons.

In 1958, Quirk made his debut in the Cape Cod Baseball League (CCBL). He struck out 17 batters and batted 3-for-5 in his first game in which the Orleans Firebirds defeated the Yarmouth-Dennis Red Sox. Two weeks later, he threw a three-hitter and struck out 15. His season record was 9 wins and 0 losses with a 1.12 ERA and a league-leading .475 batting average. In a ceremony prior to the league's all-star game, New York Yankees players Mel Allen and Phil Rizzuto presented Quirk with the league's Outstanding Pitcher Award. Quirk was inducted into the CCBL Hall of Fame in 2009.

== Professional career ==
Signed by the Baltimore Orioles as an amateur free agent in 1959, Quirk made it to the big league club in 1962. That season, he appeared in seven games for Baltimore, posting a 2–2 record while striking out 18 and allowing 18 earned runs in 27.1 innings of work. Prior to the 1963 season, Quirk was traded to the Washington Senators, and appeared in seven games for that club in his final major league campaign.

== Post-baseball career ==
Later in life, Quirk worked as the Vice President of Marketing for the technology security firm Viasec based in County Donegal, Ireland. He also served on numerous boards for organizations serving Connecticut's special needs community. Quirk died in Stonington, Connecticut in 2014 at age 76.
