= Augie Prudhomme =

American baseball player (1902–1992)

- Pitcher
- Born: November 20, 1902; Frierson, Louisiana, U.S.
- Died: October 4, 1992 (aged 89); Shreveport, Louisiana, U.S.
- Batted: Right Threw: Right

MLB debut
- April 19, 1929, for the Detroit Tigers

Last MLB appearance
- October 6, 1929, for the Detroit Tigers

MLB statistics
- Win–loss record: 1-6
- Earned run average: 6.22
- Strikeouts: 26
- Stats at Baseball Reference

Teams
- Detroit Tigers (1929)

John Olgus "Augie" Prudhomme (November 20, 1902 – October 4, 1992) was an American pitcher in Major League Baseball. He played for the Detroit Tigers in 1929.

== Career ==
Prudhomme was born in Frierson, Louisiana. He started his professional baseball career in 1926, with the New England League's Lawrence Merry Macks. That season, he went 19–11 with a 4.79 earned run average and led the league in wins and innings pitched. Prudhomme then played in the International League for a few seasons. In 1928, he went 19–15 with a 3.02 ERA, and this earned him a spot on the Detroit Tigers' roster.

1929 was Prudhomme's only season in the major leagues. He pitched in 34 games, including 6 starts, and went 1–6 with a 6.22 ERA. He returned to the minors in 1930 and his career petered out from there, as he never posted another ERA total under 4.50.

Prudhomme retired with 95 career minor league wins to go along with his lone major league victory. He died in 1992 in Shreveport, Louisiana.
