= Bill Harris (1930s pitcher) =

American baseball player (1900–1965)

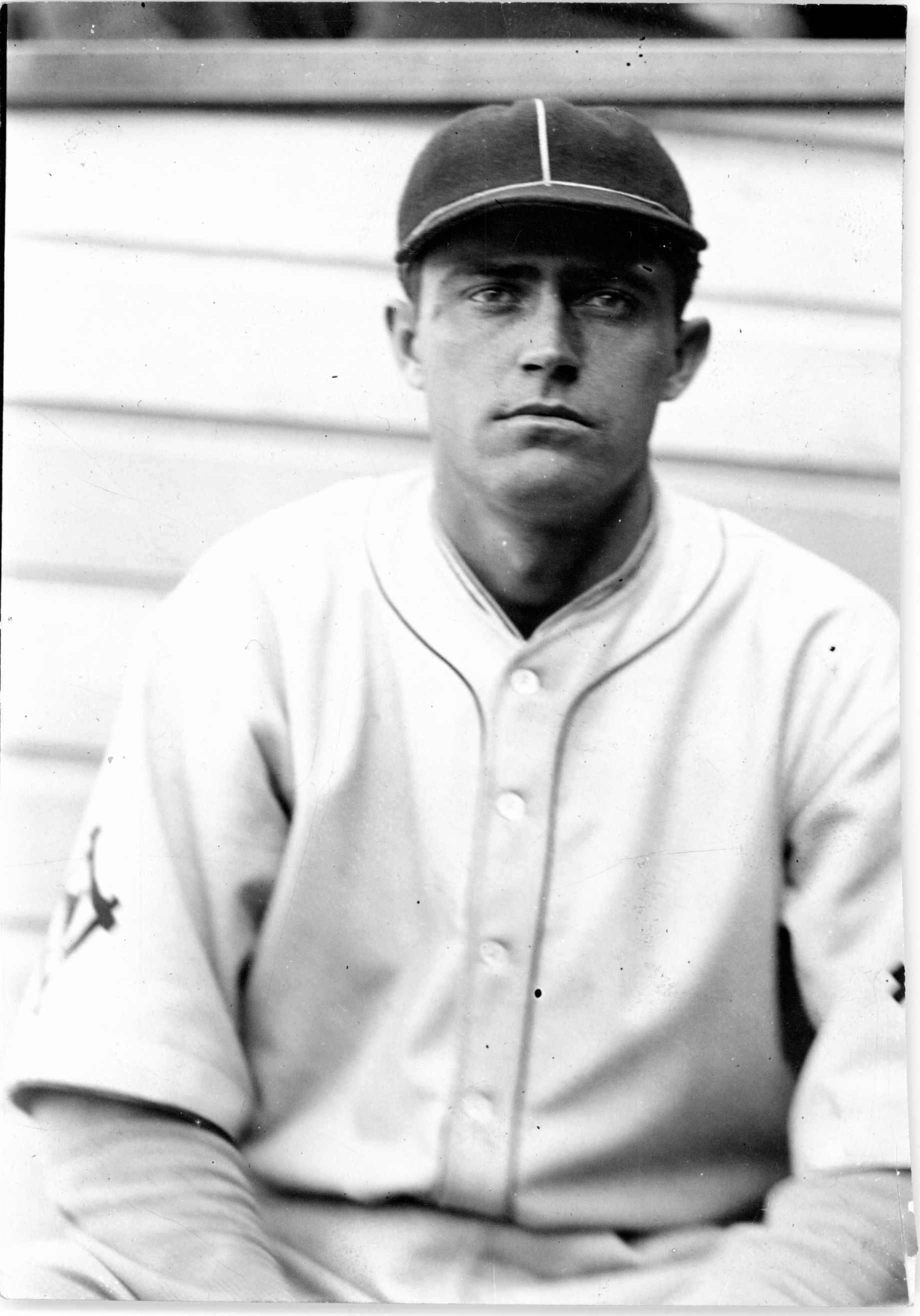
- Pitcher
- Born: June 23, 1900; Wylie, Texas, U.S.
- Died: August 21, 1965 (aged 65); Charlotte, North Carolina, U.S.
- Batted: Right Threw: Right

MLB debut
- April 22, 1923, for the Cincinnati Reds

Last MLB appearance
- October 2, 1938, for the Boston Red Sox

MLB statistics
- Win–loss record: 24-22
- Earned run average: 3.92
- Strikeouts: 149
- Stats at Baseball Reference

Teams
- Cincinnati Reds (1923–1924); Pittsburgh Pirates (1931–1934); Boston Red Sox (1938)

William Milton Harris (June 23, 1900 – August 21, 1965) spent more than 40 years in baseball, serving as a pitcher, manager and scout, for six different Major League Baseball organizations. Listed at 6 ft 1 in (1.85 m), 180 lb (81.6 kg), Harris batted and threw right-handed. He was born in Wylie, Texas.

== Playing career ==
=== Major leagues ===
He also pitched in parts of seven major league seasons for the Cincinnati Reds (1923–24), Pittsburgh Pirates (1931–34) and Boston Red Sox (1938). In 121 appearances, he posted a 24–22 record with 149 strikeouts and a 3.92 ERA in 433.2 innings of work, including 37 starts, 13 complete games, two shutouts, 55 games finished and eight saves. His most productive season came for the 1932 Pirates, when he went 10–9 with a 3.64 ERA.

Reds manager Pat Moran died during 1924 spring training; his replacement, Jack Hendricks, was not as keen on Harris. On May 29, 1924, Harris was traded to the minor league Minneapolis Millers in exchange for Hughie Critz.

Harris joined the Pirates in the fall of 1931. Sportswriter Harry Grayson thought it was odd that while no major league team tried Harris after he won 19 games with Minneapolis in 1925 and 26 games with Asheville in 1928, Pittsburgh signed him during a year in which he lost 23 minor league games. Harris thought that it was because Galveston, with which he spent most of the season, was not a great ballclub-though posting a losing record, he completed 29 games, threw six shutouts, and posted a 2.60 ERA.

On August 2, 1938, the Red Sox acquired Harris from the minor league Buffalo Bisons for Johnny Marcum and $20,000. The Red Sox, struggling to find effective pitchers, added Harris to their starting rotation.

=== Minor leagues ===
Harris collected 257 minor league wins between 1921 and 1945.

During the 1931 season, Harris threw a no-hitter with Galveston. He threw two more no-hitters for the 1935 Buffalo Bisons of the International League, though one of those was only seven innings.

Sportswriter Harry Grayson in 1938 wrote that "Harris perhaps has been with more clubs than any other athlete in the history of the game."

From 1939 through 1951, Harris worked in the New York Giants system, pitching for Jersey City of the International League from 1939 to 1943, managing the Erie Sailors of the Pennsylvania–Ontario–New York League (PONY League) from 1944 to 1945, and scouting between 1946 and 1951. He also served as a scout for the New York Yankees (1952–56, 1960–62) and Washington Senators (1957–59).

== Pitching style ==
Earlier in his career, Harris had an overhand delivery. In 1926, he broke a finger on his pitching hand while with the Millers. That prompted him to begin throwing sidearm. Grayson described him as having an "excellent sinker", as well as a fastball that was "fairly fast". Harris also threw a curveball, though Grayson thought it was his worst pitch.

== Personal life ==
By 1938, Harris was living in Matthews, North Carolina, where he grew cotton when he was not pitching. Harris died in Indian Trail, North Carolina at age 65.
