= Roy Weir =

American baseball player

- Pitcher
- Born: February 25, 1911; Portland, Maine, U.S.
- Died: September 30, 1989 (aged 78); Anaheim, California, U.S.
- Batted: Left Threw: Left

MLB debut
- June 25, 1936, for the Boston Bees

Last MLB appearance
- October 1, 1939, for the Boston Bees

MLB statistics
- Win–loss record: 6–4
- Earned run average: 3.55
- Strikeouts: 42
- Stats at Baseball Reference

Teams
- Boston Bees (1936–1939)

William Franklin "Roy" Weir (February 25, 1911 – September 30, 1989) was an American Major League Baseball (MLB) pitcher. He pitched parts of four seasons for the Boston Bees from 1936 until 1939.

During World War II, Wier served in the navy as a gunnery officer. He later had a career with New England Telephone and Illinois Bell.

Born in Portland, Maine, Wier died in Anaheim, California, aged 78.
