= Nolen Richardson =

American baseball player (1903–1951)

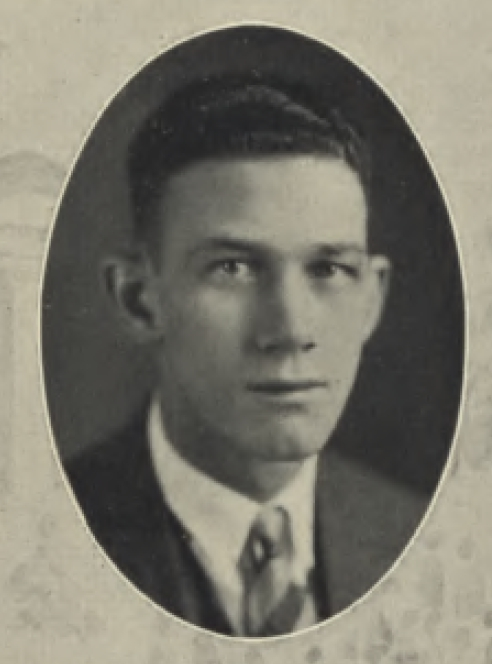
- Third baseman
- Born: January 18, 1903; Chattanooga, Tennessee, U.S.
- Died: September 25, 1951 (aged 48); Athens, Georgia, U.S.
- Batted: Right Threw: Right

MLB debut
- April 26, 1929, for the Detroit Tigers

Last MLB appearance
- April 17, 1939, for the Cincinnati Reds

MLB statistics
- Batting average: .247
- Hits: 117
- Runs batted in: 45
- Stats at Baseball Reference

Teams
- Detroit Tigers (1929, 1931–1932); New York Yankees (1935); Cincinnati Reds (1938–1939)

Clifford Nolen Richardson (January 18, 1903 – September 25, 1951) was a third baseman in Major League Baseball. He was born in Chattanooga, Tennessee and attended college at the University of Georgia where he was a member of the Sigma Chi fraternity.

Richardson played for the Detroit Tigers, New York Yankees and Cincinnati Reds in a span of six seasons between 1929 and 1939. In 168 career games, he collected 117 hits in 473 at bats for a .247 batting average.

In between, Richardson was the shortstop and team captain of the 1937 Newark Bears, which is widely regarded as the best in Minor League Baseball history. Afterwards, Richardson became the head baseball coach at the University of Georgia.

Richardson died on September 25, 1951, in Athens, Georgia. He had been suffering from cancer.
