= Dave Vineyard =

American baseball player (born 1941)

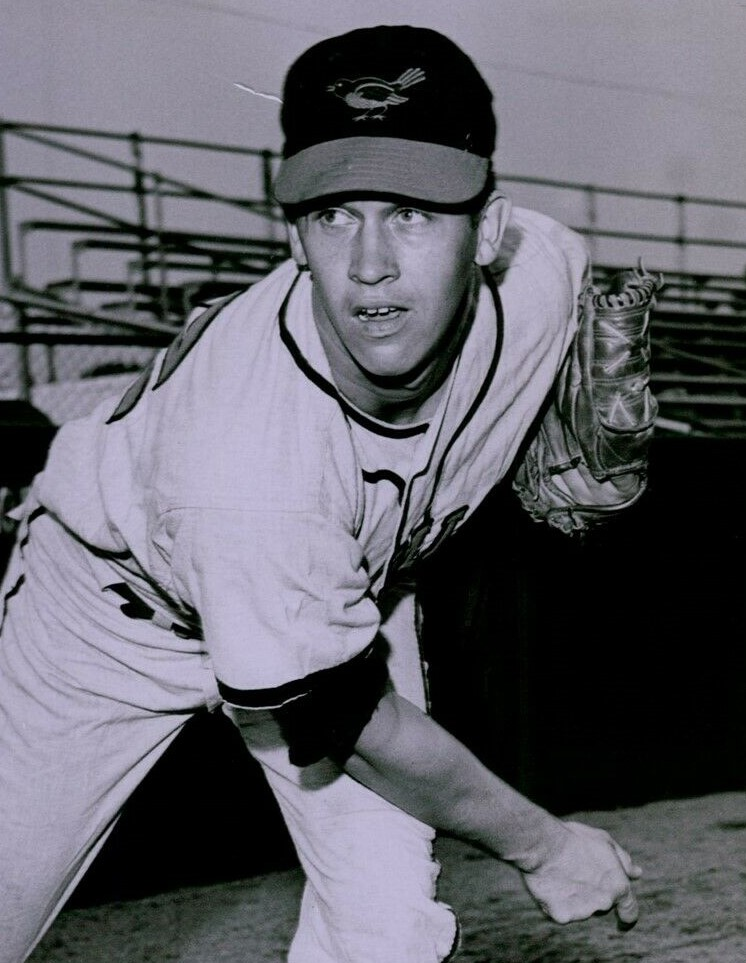
- Pitcher
- Born: February 25, 1941 (age 84); Clay, West Virginia, U.S.
- Batted: Right Threw: Right

MLB debut
- July 18, 1964, for the Baltimore Orioles

Last MLB appearance
- September 23, 1964, for the Baltimore Orioles

MLB statistics
- Win–loss record: 2–5
- Earned run average: 4.17
- Strikeouts: 50

Teams
- Baltimore Orioles (1964)

David Kent Vineyard (born February 25, 1941) is an American former pitcher in Major League Baseball who played briefly for the Baltimore Orioles during the 1964 season. Listed at 6 feet 3 inches (1.91 m), 195 pounds (88 kg), Vineyard batted and threw right-handed. He was born in Clay, West Virginia, and signed with the Cleveland Indians in 1959 after graduating from high school in Spencer. Baltimore selected him in the minor league draft after that season.

In his one season in the majors, Vineyard posted a 2–5 won–lost record with a 4.17 ERA in 19 pitching appearances, including six starts and one complete game. He allowed 34 runs (nine unearned) on 57 hits and 27 walks while striking out 50 in 54 innings of work.

His nine-year pro career ended in 1967.
