= List of baseball parks in Toronto =

This is a list of venues used for professional baseball in Toronto, Ontario. The information is a compilation of the information contained in the references listed.

ballpark unknown
Home of: Toronto - Ontario League (1884)

Jarvis Street Lacrosse Grounds
Home of: Toronto - Canadian League (1885)
Location: Jarvis and Wellesley Streets (northwest corner) on William Cawthra's property; used from 1872 to 1890 for lacrosse by the Toronto Lacrosse Club and the Toronto Baseball Club 1885; sold with homes and church built on site; now residential and commercial district called Cawthra Square

Sunlight Park a.k.a. Toronto Baseball Grounds
Home of:

Toronto Canucks International League/Association 1886-1890
Toronto Canadians/Canucks/Royals/Maple Leafs Eastern/International League (1895-1896)

Location: south-west of Queen Street East and Broadview, south to Eastern Avenue
Later usage: Converted to industrial, now some residential

Hanlan's Point Stadium a.k.a. Maple Leaf Park
Home of: Toronto Maple Leafs - International League (1897-1900 or 1901 - sources vary) and (1908 or 1909 - sources vary - through 1925)
Location: Hanlan's Point on the Toronto Islands
Later usage: Converted to parkland after airport was built.

Diamond Park
Home of: Toronto Maple Leafs - International League (1901–1907,1909)
Location: Liberty Street and Fraser Avenue
Later usage: E. W. Gillett Company factory complex opened on site in 1912; now occupied by Kobo Inc.

ballpark name unknown
Home of: Toronto Beavers - Canadian League 1914 (disbanded mid-season)
Location: unknown

Maple Leaf Stadium
Home of: Toronto Maple Leafs - IL (1926-1967)
Location: the foot of Bathurst Street on the south side of Lake Shore Boulevard (formerly Fleet Street); location also given as 555 Lake Shore Boulevard West, Stadium Road, Western Channel, Bathurst Street
Later usage: Public park and picnic grounds

Dominico Field (Christie Pits)
Home of: Toronto Maple Leafs -Intercounty baseball (1969-present)
Location: Bloor Street West at Christie Street

Exhibition Stadium
Home of: Toronto Blue Jays - American League (1977-1988)
Location: New Brunswick Way (right field); Lake Shore Boulevard (first base); Prince's Boulevard (left field)
Currently: site occupied by BMO Field, 170 Prince's Boulevard

Rogers Centre orig. SkyDome
Home of: Toronto Blue Jays - AL (1989-2019, ?-present) (no games in Toronto 2020 - mid-season 2021 due to COVID-19 travel restrictions)
Location: 1 Blue Jays Way (next to CN Tower), north of Lake Shore Boulevard, east of Spadina Avenue.

== See also ==
- Lists of baseball parks
- Sahlen Field
- TD Ballpark

== Sources ==
- Peter Filichia, Professional Baseball Franchises, Facts on File, 1993.
- Michael Benson, Ballparks of North America, McFarland, 1989.
