= 1917 International League season =

- League: International League
- Sport: Baseball
- Duration: April 17 – September 16
- Games: 154
- Teams: 8

International League Pennant
- League champions: Toronto Maple Leafs
- Runners-up: Providence Grays

IL seasons
- ← 1916 1918 →

The 1917 International League was a Class AA baseball season played between April 17 and September 16. Eight teams played a 154-game schedule, with the first place team winning the pennant.

The Toronto Maple Leafs won the International League pennant, finishing in first place, one-and-a-half games ahead of the second place Providence Grays.

== Team changes ==
- The Richmond Climbers are renamed the Richmond Virginians.
- The Newark Indians are renamed the Newark Bears.

== Teams ==
1917 International League
Team	City	MLB Affiliate	Stadium
Baltimore Orioles	Baltimore, Maryland	None	Oriole Park
Buffalo Bisons	Buffalo, New York	None	Buffalo Baseball Park
Montreal Royals	Montreal, Quebec	None	Atwater Park
Newark Bears	Newark, New Jersey	None	Harrison Park
Providence Grays	Providence, Rhode Island	None	Melrose Park
Richmond Virginians	Richmond, Virginia	None	Broad Street Park
Rochester Hustlers	Rochester, New York	None	Bay Street Ball Grounds
Toronto Maple Leafs	Toronto, Ontario	None	Hanlan's Point Stadium

== Map of teams ==
International League teams

== Regular season ==
=== Standings ===
International League
Team	Win	Loss	%	GB
Toronto Maple Leafs	93	61	.604	–
Providence Grays	90	61	.596	1.5
Baltimore Orioles	88	61	.591	2.5
Newark Bears	86	68	.558	7
Rochester Hustlers	72	82	.468	21
Buffalo Bisons	67	84	.444	24.5
Montreal Royals	56	94	.373	35
Richmond Virginians	53	94	.361	36.5

== League Leaders ==
=== Batting leaders ===
Stat	Player	Total
H	Nap Lajoie, Toronto Maple Leafs	221
2B	Nap Lajoie, Toronto Maple Leafs	39
3B	Guy Tutwiler, Providence Grays	17
HR	Harry Damrau, Montreal Royals	16

=== Pitching leaders ===
Stat	Player	Total
W	Harry Thompson, Toronto Maple Leafs; Hank Thormahlen, Baltimore Orioles	25
ERA	Vean Gregg, Providence Grays	1.72

== See also ==
- 1917 Major League Baseball season
