= 1915 International League season =

- League: International League
- Sport: Baseball
- Duration: April 27 – September 18
- Games: 140
- Teams: 8

International League Pennant
- League champions: Buffalo Bisons
- Runners-up: Providence Grays

IL seasons
- ← 1914 1916 →

The 1915 International League was a Class AA baseball season played between April 27 and September 18. Eight teams played a 140-game schedule, with the first place team winning the pennant.

The Buffalo Bisons won the International League pennant, finishing in first place, two games ahead of the second place Providence Grays.

== Team changes ==
- The Baltimore Orioles relocated to Richmond, Virginia and were renamed the Richmond Climbers.
- During the season, the Newark Indians relocated to Harrisburg, Pennsylvania and became the Harrisburg Senators.

== Teams ==
1915 International League
| Team | City | MLB Affiliate | Stadium |
| Buffalo Bisons | Buffalo, New York | None | Buffalo Baseball Park |
| Jersey City Skeeters | Jersey City, New Jersey | None | West Side Park |
| Montreal Royals | Montreal, Quebec | None | Atwater Park |
| Newark Indians; Harrisburg Senators | Newark, New Jersey; Harrisburg, Pennsylvania | None | Wiedenmayer's Park; Island Park |
| Providence Grays | Providence, Rhode Island | None | Melrose Park |
| Richmond Climbers | Richmond, Virginia | None | Broad Street Park |
| Rochester Hustlers | Rochester, New York | None | Bay Street Ball Grounds |
| Toronto Maple Leafs | Toronto, Ontario | None | Hanlan's Point Stadium |

== Map of teams ==
International League teams

== Regular season ==
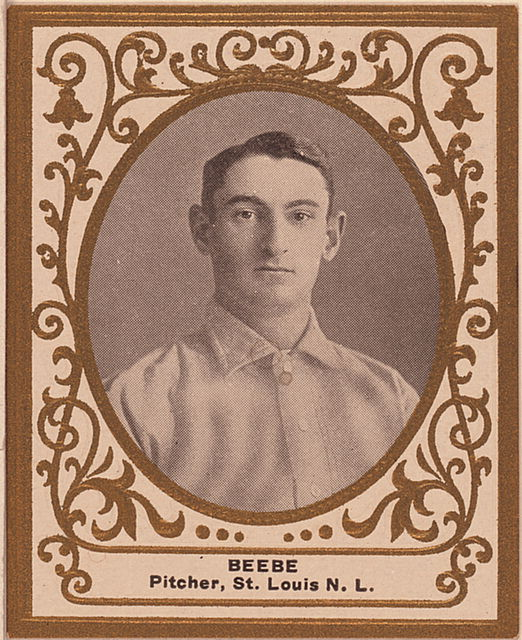
Fred Beebe of the Buffalo Bisons led the league with 27 wins and threw a no-hitter on August 18 against the Montreal Royals.

- On July 14, Joe Oeschger of the Providence Grays pitched a no-hitter against the Toronto Maple Leafs. The Grays defeated the Maple Leafs 1-0.
- On August 18, Fred Beebe of the Buffalo Bisons pitched a no-hitter against the Montreal Royals. The Bisons defeated the Royals 5-0.
- On September 10, Fred Winchell of the Toronto Maple Leafs pitched a no-hitter against the Harrisburg Senators. The Maple Leafs defeated the Senators 5-1 in a shortened seven inning game.

=== Standings ===
International League
| Team | Win | Loss | % | GB |
|---|---|---|---|---|
| Buffalo Bisons | 86 | 50 | .632 | – |
| Providence Grays | 85 | 53 | .616 | 2 |
| Toronto Maple Leafs | 72 | 67 | .518 | 15.5 |
| Rochester Hustlers | 69 | 69 | .500 | 18 |
| Montreal Royals | 67 | 70 | .489 | 19.5 |
| Newark Indians/Harrisburg Senators | 61 | 76 | .445 | 20.5 |
| Richmond Climbers | 59 | 81 | .421 | 29 |
| Jersey City Skeeters | 52 | 85 | .380 | 34.5 |

== League Leaders ==
=== Batting leaders ===
| Stat | Player | Total |
|---|---|---|
| AVG | Morrie Rath, Toronto Maple Leafs | .332 |
| HR | George Whiteman, Montreal Royals | 14 |
| R | George Whiteman, Montreal Royals | 106 |
| H | Chick Shorten, Providence Grays | 175 |
| SB | Frank Gilhooley, Buffalo Bisons | 53 |

=== Pitching leaders ===
| Stat | Player | Total |
|---|---|---|
| W | Fred Beebe, Buffalo Bisons | 27 |
| L | Bill Morrisette, Richmond Climbers | 26 |
| IP | Lore Bader, Buffalo Bisons | 333.2 |

== See also ==
- 1915 Major League Baseball season
