= 1916 International League season =

- League: International League
- Sport: Baseball
- Duration: April 26 – September 17
- Games: 140
- Teams: 8

International League Pennant
- League champions: Buffalo Bisons
- Runners-up: Providence Grays

IL seasons
- ← 1915 1917 →

The 1916 International League was a Class AA baseball season played between April 26 and September 17. Eight teams played a 140-game schedule, with the first place team winning the pennant.

The Buffalo Bisons won the International League pennant, finishing in first place, five games ahead of the second place Providence Grays.

== Team changes ==
- The Jersey City Skeeters were sold to James R. Price and Fred Tenney, who relocated the team to Newark, New Jersey and renamed the team the Newark Indians.
- The Harrisburg Senators moved to the New York State League.
- The Baltimore Orioles return to the league after a one-year absence.

== Teams ==
1916 International League
Team	City	MLB Affiliate	Stadium
Baltimore Orioles	Baltimore, Maryland	None	Oriole Park
Buffalo Bisons	Buffalo, New York	None	Buffalo Baseball Park
Montreal Royals	Montreal, Quebec	None	Atwater Park
Newark Indians	Newark, New Jersey	None	Harrison Park
Providence Grays	Providence, Rhode Island	None	Melrose Park
Richmond Climbers	Richmond, Virginia	None	Broad Street Park
Rochester Hustlers	Rochester, New York	None	Bay Street Ball Grounds
Toronto Maple Leafs	Toronto, Ontario	None	Hanlan's Point Stadium

== Map of teams ==
International League teams

== Regular season ==
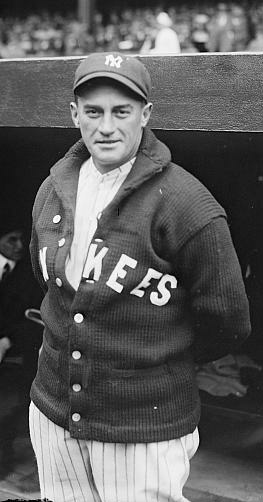
Urban Shocker of the Toronto Maple Leafs pitched an eleven inning no-hitter.

- On July 22, Urban Shocker of the Toronto Maple Leafs pitched a no-hitter against the Rochester Hustlers. The Maple Leafs defeated the Hustlers 1–0 in eleven innings.

=== Standings ===
International League
Team	Win	Loss	%	GB
Buffalo Bisons	82	58	.586	–
Providence Grays	76	62	.551	5
Montreal Royals	75	64	.540	6.5
Baltimore Orioles	74	66	.529	8
Toronto Maple Leafs	73	66	.525	8.5
Richmond Climbers	64	75	.460	17.5
Rochester Hustlers	60	78	.435	21
Newark Indians	52	87	.374	29.5

== League Leaders ==
=== Batting leaders ===
Stat	Player	Total
HR	George Twombly, Baltimore Orioles	12
H	Bill Bankston, Richmond Climbers	166

=== Pitching leaders ===
Stat	Player	Total
W	Leon Cadore, Montreal Royals	25

== See also ==
- 1916 Major League Baseball season
