= 1913 International League season =

- League: International League
- Sport: Baseball
- Duration: April 16 – September 21
- Games: 154
- Teams: 8

International League Pennant
- League champions: Newark Indians
- Runners-up: Rochester Hustlers

IL seasons
- ← 1912 1914 →

The 1913 International League was a Class AA baseball season played between April 16 and September 21. Eight teams played a 154-game schedule, with the first place team winning the pennant.

The Newark Indians won the International League pennant, finishing in first place, four games ahead of the second place Rochester Hustlers.

== Teams ==
1913 International League
| Team | City | MLB Affiliate | Stadium |
| Baltimore Orioles | Baltimore, Maryland | None | Oriole Park IV |
| Buffalo Bisons | Buffalo, New York | None | Buffalo Baseball Park |
| Jersey City Skeeters | Jersey City, New Jersey | None | West Side Park |
| Montreal Royals | Montreal, Quebec | None | Atwater Park |
| Newark Indians | Newark, New Jersey | None | Wiedenmayer's Park |
| Providence Grays | Providence, Rhode Island | None | Melrose Park |
| Rochester Hustlers | Rochester, New York | None | Bay Street Ball Grounds |
| Toronto Maple Leafs | Toronto, Ontario | None | Hanlan's Point Stadium |

== Map of teams ==
International League teams

== Regular season ==
=== Standings ===
International League
| Team | Win | Loss | % | GB |
|---|---|---|---|---|
| Newark Indians | 95 | 57 | .625 | – |
| Rochester Hustlers | 92 | 62 | .597 | 4 |
| Baltimore Orioles | 77 | 73 | .513 | 17 |
| Buffalo Bisons | 78 | 75 | .510 | 17.5 |
| Montreal Royals | 74 | 77 | .490 | 20.5 |
| Providence Grays | 69 | 80 | .463 | 24.5 |
| Toronto Maple Leafs | 70 | 83 | .458 | 25.5 |
| Jersey City Skeeters | 53 | 101 | .344 | 43 |

== League Leaders ==
=== Batting leaders ===
| Stat | Player | Total |
|---|---|---|
| AVG | Hack Simmons, Rochester Hustlers | .339 |
| HR | Del Paddock, Rochester Hustlers | 8 |
| R | Fritz Maisel, Baltimore Orioles | 110 |
| H | Hack Simmons, Rochester Hustlers | 185 |
| SB | Fritz Maisel, Baltimore Orioles | 44 |

=== Pitching leaders ===
| Stat | Player | Total |
|---|---|---|
| W | Watty Lee, Newark Indians; Dave Roth, Baltimore Orioles | 22 |
| L | Chick Brandom, Jersey City Skeeters; Iron Davis, Jersey City Skeeters; Frank Smith, Montreal Royals | 16 |
| SO | Iron Davis, Jersey City Skeeters | 199 |
| IP | Frank Smith, Montreal Royals | 353.2 |

== See also ==
- 1913 Major League Baseball season
