= 1912 International League season =

- League: International League
- Sport: Baseball
- Duration: April 18 – September 22
- Games: 154
- Teams: 8

International League Pennant
- League champions: Toronto Maple Leafs
- Runners-up: Rochester Hustlers

IL seasons
- ← 1911 1913 →

The 1912 International League was a Class AA baseball season played between April 18 and September 27. Eight teams played a 154-game schedule, with the first place team winning the pennant.

The Toronto Maple Leafs won the International League pennant, finishing in first place, five games ahead of the second place Rochester Hustlers.

== Teams ==
1912 International League
Team	City	MLB Affiliate	Stadium
Baltimore Orioles	Baltimore, Maryland	None	Oriole Park IV
Buffalo Bisons	Buffalo, New York	None	Buffalo Baseball Park
Jersey City Skeeters	Jersey City, New Jersey	None	West Side Park
Montreal Royals	Montreal, Quebec	None	Atwater Park
Newark Indians	Newark, New Jersey	None	Wiedenmayer's Park
Providence Grays	Providence, Rhode Island	None	Melrose Park
Rochester Hustlers	Rochester, New York	None	Bay Street Ball Grounds
Toronto Maple Leafs	Toronto, Ontario	None	Hanlan's Point Stadium

== Map of teams ==
International League teams

== Regular season ==
=== Summary ===
- On July 6, John Frill of the Jersey City Skeeters threw the first no-hitter and perfect game in league history, as he allowed no baserunners in a 4-0 win over the Providence Grays at West Side Park in Jersey City, New Jersey. The game was shortened to seven innings due to the umpires having to leave to catch a train.

=== Standings ===
International League
Team	Win	Loss	%	GB
Toronto Maple Leafs	91	62	.595	–
Rochester Hustlers	86	67	.562	5
Newark Indians	80	72	.526	10.5
Baltimore Orioles	74	75	.497	15
Buffalo Bisons	71	78	.477	18
Montreal Royals	71	81	.467	19.5
Jersey City Skeeters	70	84	.455	21.5
Providence Grays	63	87	.420	26.5

== League Leaders ==
=== Batting leaders ===
Stat	Player	Total
HR	Tim Jordan, Toronto Maple Leafs	19
H	Harry Swacina, Newark Indians	193

=== Pitching leaders ===
Stat	Player	Total
W	Dick Rudolph, Toronto Maple Leafs	25

== See also ==
- 1912 Major League Baseball season
