= 1914 International League season =

- League: International League
- Sport: Baseball
- Duration: April 24 – September 27
- Games: 154
- Teams: 8

International League Pennant
- League champions: Providence Grays
- Runners-up: Buffalo Bisons

IL seasons
- ← 1913 1915 →

The 1914 International League was a Class AA baseball season played between April 24 and September 27. Eight teams played a 154-game schedule, with the first place team winning the pennant.

The Providence Grays won the International League pennant, finishing in first place, four games ahead of the second place Buffalo Bisons.

== Teams ==
1914 International League
Team	City	MLB Affiliate	Stadium
Baltimore Orioles	Baltimore, Maryland	None	Oriole Park IV
Buffalo Bisons	Buffalo, New York	None	Buffalo Baseball Park
Jersey City Skeeters	Jersey City, New Jersey	None	West Side Park
Montreal Royals	Montreal, Quebec	None	Atwater Park
Newark Indians	Newark, New Jersey	None	Wiedenmayer's Park
Providence Grays	Providence, Rhode Island	None	Melrose Park
Rochester Hustlers	Rochester, New York	None	Bay Street Ball Grounds
Toronto Maple Leafs	Toronto, Ontario	None	Hanlan's Point Stadium

== Map of teams ==
International League teams

== Regular season ==
=== Summary ===
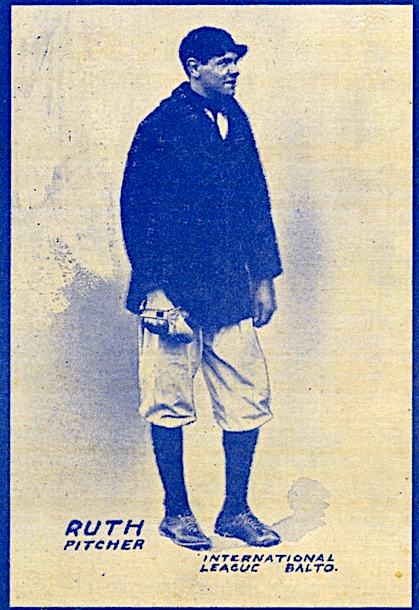
A 1914 baseball card of Babe Ruth with the Baltimore Orioles.

- The 1914 season was the professional debut of 19-year old Babe Ruth, who split the season between the Baltimore Orioles and Providence Grays.
- Fred Herbert of the Toronto Maple Leafs threw a no-hitter in a 15-0 win over the Baltimore Orioles on July 25 at Hanlan's Point Stadium in Toronto, Ontario. The game was shortened to seven innings.
- On August 11, Bill Upham of the Rochester Hustlers threw a six inning perfect game in a rain-shortened 0-0 tie against the Jersey City Skeeters at West Side Park in Jersey City, New Jersey.

=== Standings ===
International League
Team	Win	Loss	%	GB
Providence Grays	95	59	.617	–
Buffalo Bisons	89	61	.593	4
Rochester Hustlers	91	63	.591	4
Toronto Maple Leafs	74	70	.514	16
Newark Indians	73	77	.487	20
Baltimore Orioles	72	77	.483	20.5
Montreal Royals	60	89	.403	32.5
Jersey City Skeeters	48	106	.312	47

== League Leaders ==
=== Batting leaders ===
Stat	Player	Total
AVG	Birdie Cree, Baltimore Orioles	.356
HR	Wally Pipp, Rochester Hustlers	16
R	Claud Derrick, Baltimore Orioles	142
H	Al Platte, Providence Grays	190
SB	Frank Gilhooley, Buffalo Bisons	62

=== Pitching leaders ===
Stat	Player	Total
W	Carl Mays, Providence Grays	24
L	Fred Bruck, Jersey City Skeeters	19
SO	Tom Hughes, Rochester Hustlers	182
IP	Allen Russell, Baltimore Orioles	286.0

== See also ==
- 1914 Major League Baseball season
