= Maple Leaf Stadium =

Former baseball stadium in Toronto, Canada

Coordinates: 43°38′06.94″N 79°24′00.80″W

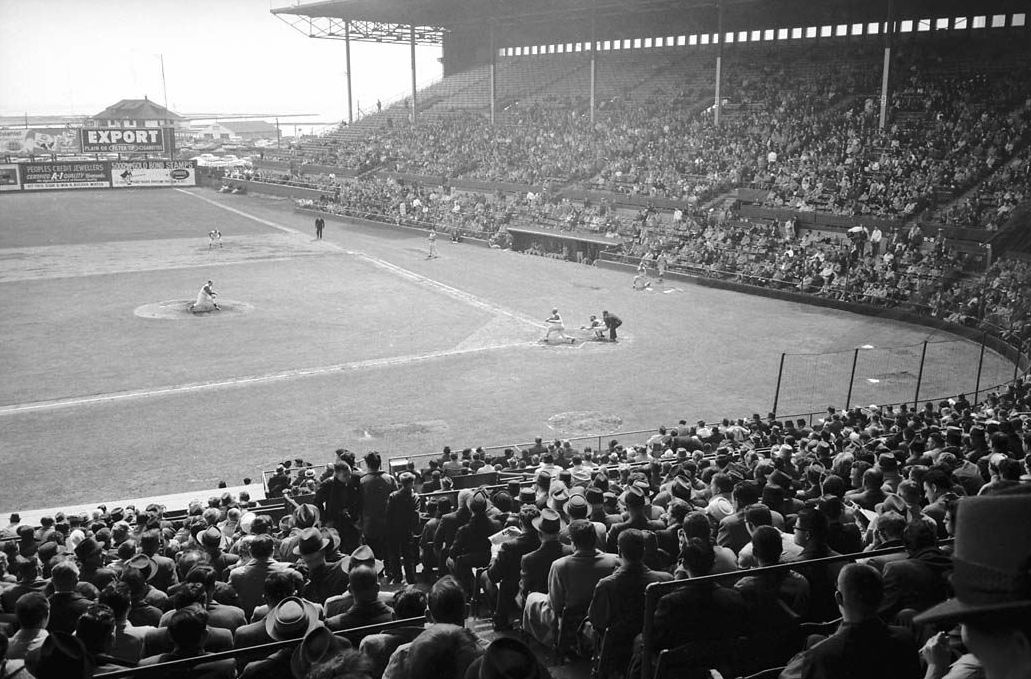
- Maple Leaf Stadium in May 1961
- Interactive map of Maple Leaf Stadium
- Location: Bathurst Street and Lake Shore Boulevard West
- Owner: Lol Solman, Jack Kent Cooke
- Operator: Lol Solman, Jack Kent Cooke
- Capacity: approx 23,500
- Surface: Grass

Construction
- Groundbreaking: 1925
- Opened: April 29, 1926
- Closed: September 4, 1967
- Demolished: 1968
- Cost: approx. CA$750,000 ($13.4 million in 2025 dollars)
- Architect: Chapman, Oxley & Bishop

Tenants
- Toronto Maple Leafs baseball club (1926-1967); Toronto Rifles football (1965)

Maple Leaf Stadium was a jewel box-style baseball stadium in Toronto, Ontario, Canada, located at the foot of Bathurst Street on the south side of Lake Shore Boulevard (formerly Fleet Street). It was built in 1926 by Lol Solman for his Toronto Maple Leafs baseball team of the International League. Previously, the Maple Leafs had played at Hanlan's Point Stadium. It continued to be the home of the Leafs for 42 seasons, until the team left town following the 1967 season. The stadium was demolished in 1968. Formerly, fans often referred to the stadium as the "Fleet Street Flats".

== History ==
In 1925, the Maple Leafs acquired land at the foot of Bathurst Street on new land that had been in-filled from the lake by the Toronto Harbour Commission. Maple Leaf Stadium was designed by architects Chapman, Oxley and Bishop. Initial plans were for a 30,000 seat venue for baseball, football, and other sports. Construction was financed by the team and the Commission was to own the stadium. Construction was initially budgeted at $300,000 but was completed for $750,000.

The opening game was held on April 29, 1926, with the Maple Leafs rallying to defeat the Reading Keystones in extra innings before a rain-soaked crowd of 12,781. Toronto mayor Thomas Foster threw out the first pitch, caught by former mayor Thomas Church. Games were held only during the day until 1934 when lights for night games were installed.

In 1951, the Maple Leafs were sold to Jack Kent Cooke. Cooke spent $57,000 to refurbish the stadium. During the 1950s, attendance at games surged as Cooke promoted the games heavily on his radio station, CKEY, and the team gave away prizes to attendees. Twice, the team had better attendance than major-league teams.

On November 8, 1926, Maple Leaf Stadium was the site of the first professional American football game to be played outside the United States, a 28-0 victory for the New York Yankees over the Los Angeles Wildcats, both of the first American Football League. Estimated attendance for the game was 10,000. The Toronto Rifles of the Continental Football League played at the venue for their first season in 1965.

In the early 1960s, Cooke tried to persuade Toronto city council a new stadium was needed to attract a major league team, though the City of Toronto government was unwilling to shoulder the costs. Cooke, who had moved to the United States in 1960, sold the Maple Leafs in 1964. The Maple Leafs were sold again in 1967 and transferred to Louisville, Kentucky. By that time, the stadium was estimated to need $250,000 worth of repairs. The final home game, on September 4, 1967, drew a paid attendance of 802.

After the Maple Leafs left, the stadium was considered to be a safety hazard and demolition began within a few months into 1968. The site is currently occupied by apartment buildings. The adjacent Little Norway Park includes a ball field.

The site was part of the 1976 Toronto Olympic bid, which would have seen a domed stadium built and be part of a larger ‘Harbour City’ concept. Toronto lost out as a candidate city to Montreal in 1968, canceling any plans for a stadium on the site.

=== Dimensions ===
Information about the outfield dimensions is hard to find. In 1946, left field was stated as 311 feet (95 m), center field 425 feet (130 m), and right field 310 feet (94 m).

Photos show that the outfield fence was originally a wide, sweeping curve, giving it a reputation as a pitchers' park. Later, inner fences were built across left-center and right-center fields, giving the batters a better chance at hitting home runs.

== International League Governors' Cup Finals at Maple Leaf Stadium ==
Year	Champion	Score	Runner-up
1934	Toronto Maple Leafs	4–1	Rochester Red Wings
1943	Syracuse Chiefs	4–2	Toronto Maple Leafs
1955	Rochester Red Wings	4–0	Toronto Maple Leafs
1956	Rochester Red Wings	4–3	Toronto Maple Leafs
1958	Montreal Royals	4–1	Toronto Maple Leafs
1960	Toronto Maple Leafs	4–1	Rochester Red Wings
1965	Toronto Maple Leafs	4–1	Columbus Jets
1966	Toronto Maple Leafs	4–1	Richmond Braves

== Junior World Series at Maple Leaf Stadium ==
Year	Champion	Score	Runner-up
1926	Toronto Maple Leafs	5–0	Louisville Colonels
1934	Columbus Red Birds	5–4	Toronto Maple Leafs
1960	Louisville Colonels	4–2	Toronto Maple Leafs

== Photo gallery ==
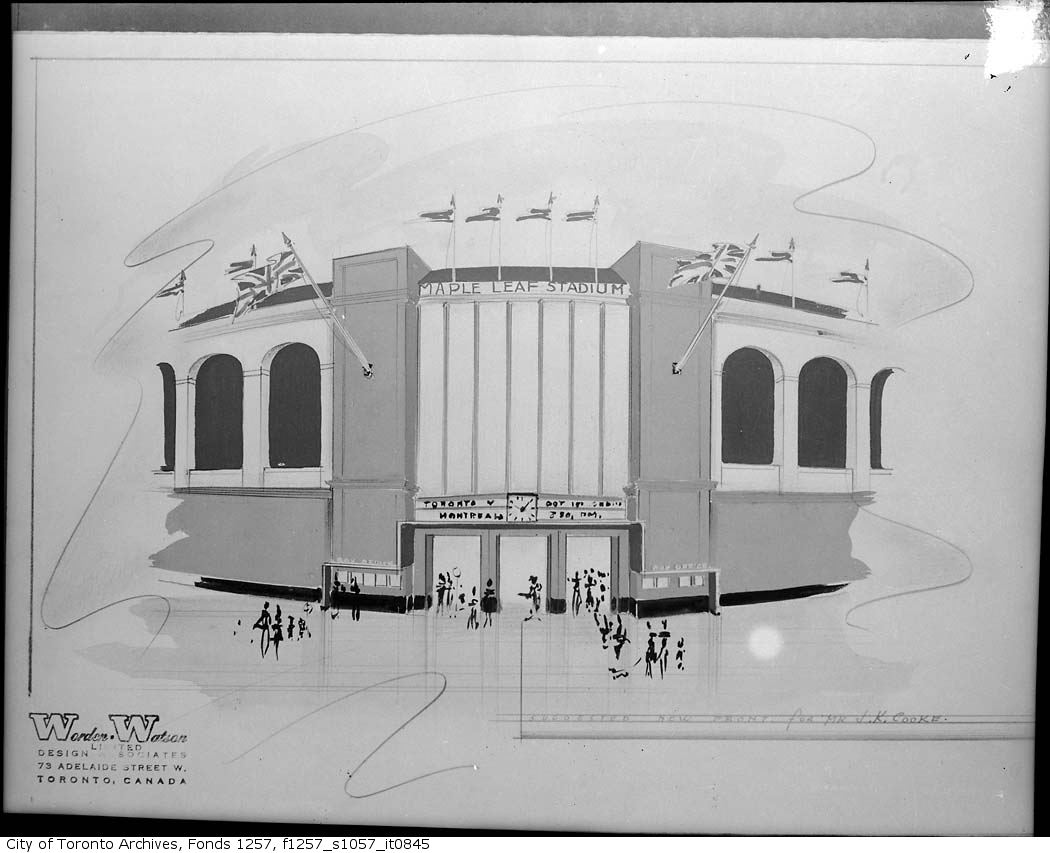
Original Design

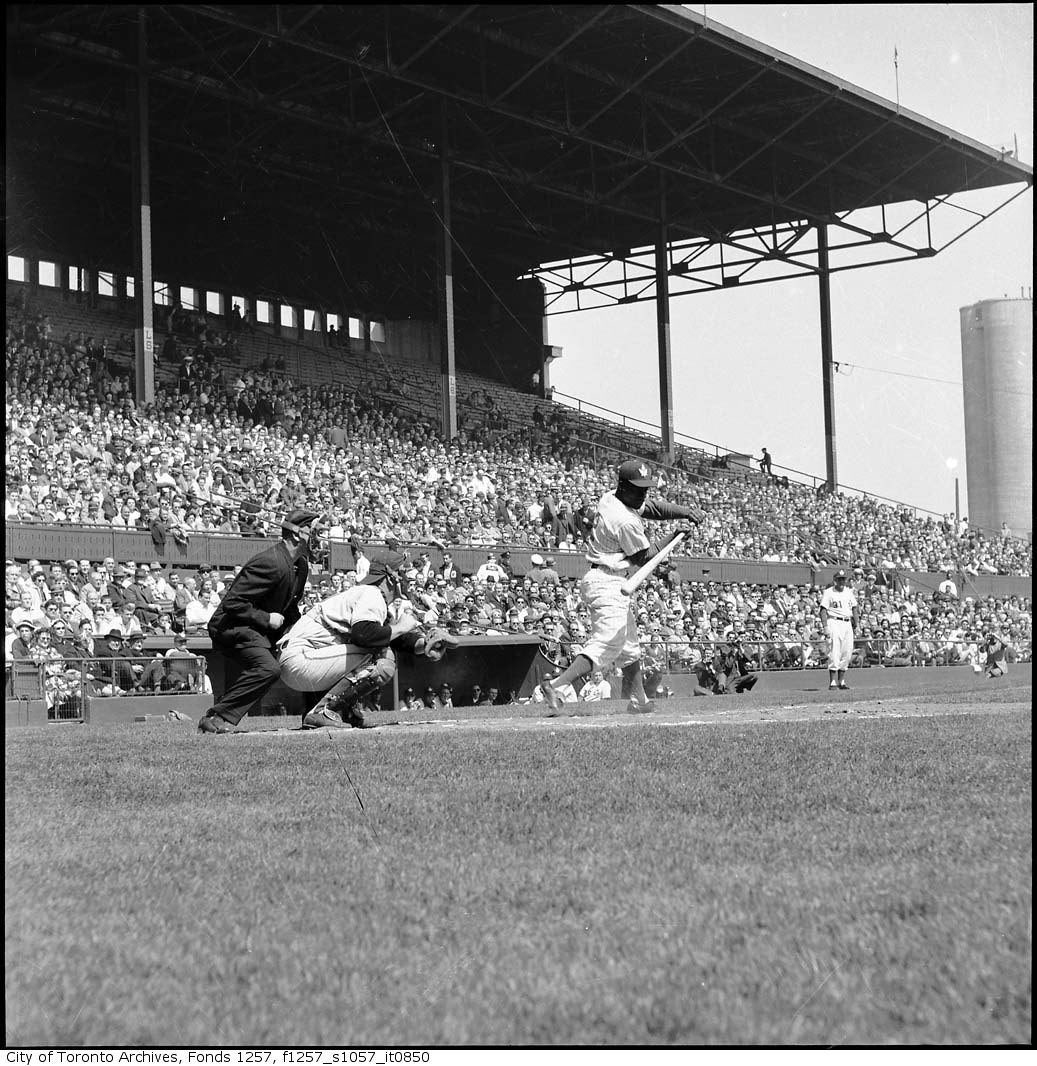
Third Base Line (Photographed in 1960)

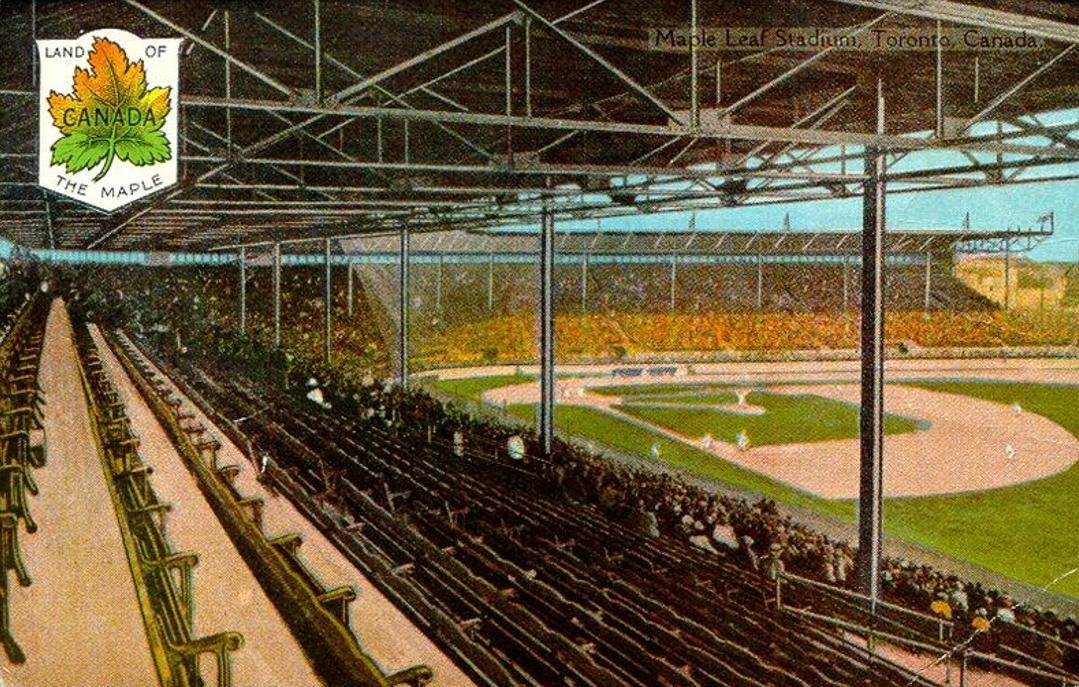
Post Card

== See also ==
- Exhibition Stadium
- Hanlan's Point Stadium
- Rogers Centre
- Sunlight Park
