= Diamond Park (Toronto) =

Former baseball stadium in Toronto, Canada

Coordinates: 43.6373°N 79.4235°W

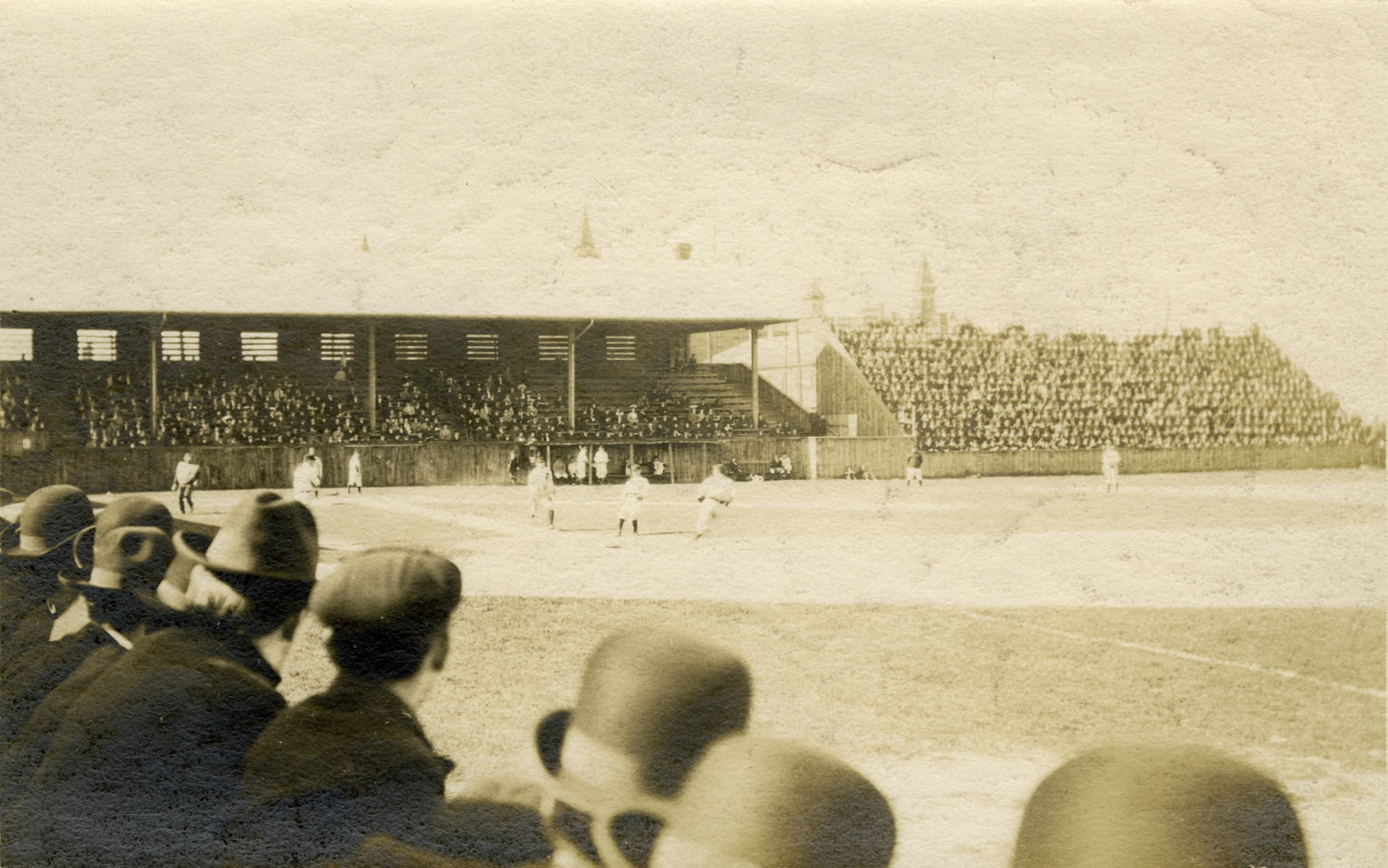
- View of game at Diamond Park in Toronto
- Interactive map of Diamond Park
- Location: Liberty Street at Fraser Avenue, Toronto, Ontario, Canada
- Capacity: 5,200
- Surface: Grass

Construction
- Groundbreaking: 1900
- Opened: May 10, 1901
- Closed: 1908

Tenant
- Toronto Maple Leafs baseball club

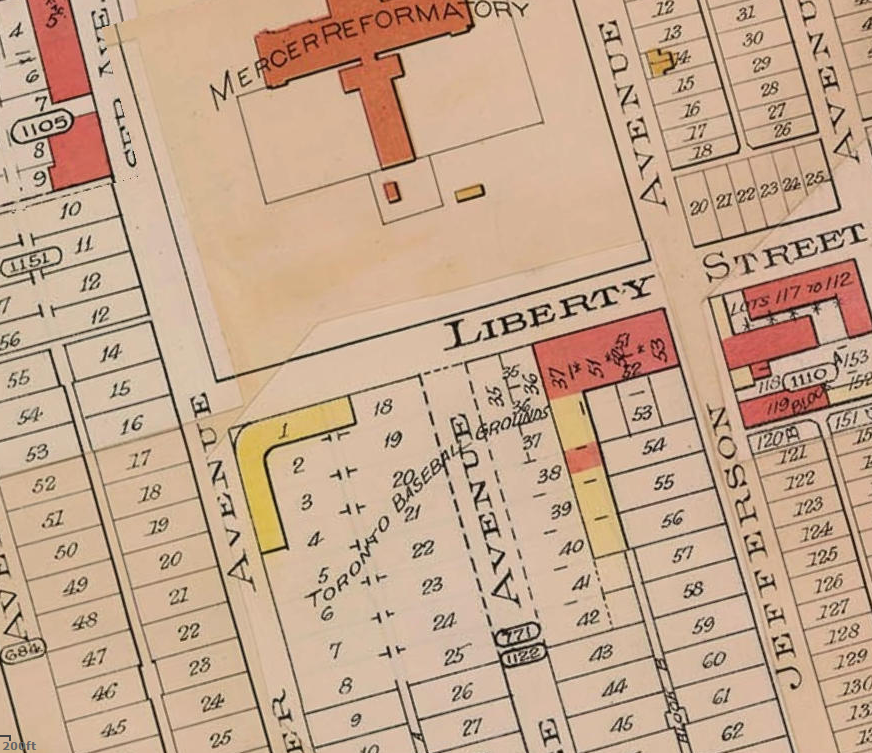
Map excerpt showing location of Diamond Park in 1903

Diamond Park was a baseball stadium in Toronto, Ontario, Canada. It was the home of the Toronto Maple Leafs professional baseball club from 1901 until 1907. It was located at the south-east corner of Liberty Street and Fraser Avenue. The stadium was also used for rugby football and lacrosse.

The Maple Leafs, who had been playing at Hanlan's Point Stadium on the Toronto Islands were sold in 1900 to a group of 52 Toronto businessmen, spearheaded by Ed Mack, a tailor and former baseball player. The organization decided to construct a new stadium for the team on the mainland, which they named Diamond Park. The stadium was not ready in time for the 1901 season, forcing the team to play its first 13 games on the road. The team played its first game in the new stadium on May 10, 1901, to 5,200 fans, losing 6–5 to Worcester. The game was preceded by a parade from downtown to the stadium. The ceremonial first pitch was thrown by School Inspector James L. Hughes. Tickets for the games cost 25 cents for general admission, 40 cents for the grandstand and 50 cents for reserved seating.

Led by manager Ed Barrow, who was also co-owner, the Leafs won the International League pennant in 1902 with a record of 85–42. The team faltered after its championship season, falling to eighth place by 1905. Debt holders called in their loans and the team was purchased by James J. McCaffery, who served as team president from 1908 until his death in 1922, and Lawrence "Lol" Solman, president from 1922 to 1931. Former major league star Joe Kelley took the reins as manager in 1907 and the team's fortunes immediately turned around. Kelley was drafted by the Boston Doves the next season, when the Leafs returned to Hanlan's Point Stadium.

The site was sold in 1907 by the ball club to H. C. Harris under the condition that "no games or amusement enterprises" were to take place without the ball club's consent. In 1908, a strip of land 96 feet (29 m) in left field was subdivided, making it smaller for baseball, although it would continue in use for amateur baseball and other sports. However, the Maple Leafs were to return to the park in August 1909 to finish the 1909 season after Hanlan's Point Stadium burned down. Owner Harris offered the field at no charge to the Maple Leafs, who had to quickly build a new left field bleacher after the old bleacher had been torn down.

In 1911, construction began on a new E. W. Gillett Company factory complex on the site, which opened in 1912. The factory is now the headquarters of Kobo Inc. Across the street to the north is Lamport Stadium, used for rugby, field hockey and soccer, built on the site of the Mercer Reformatory.
