= Bluebell (1906 ship) =

Canadian ferry

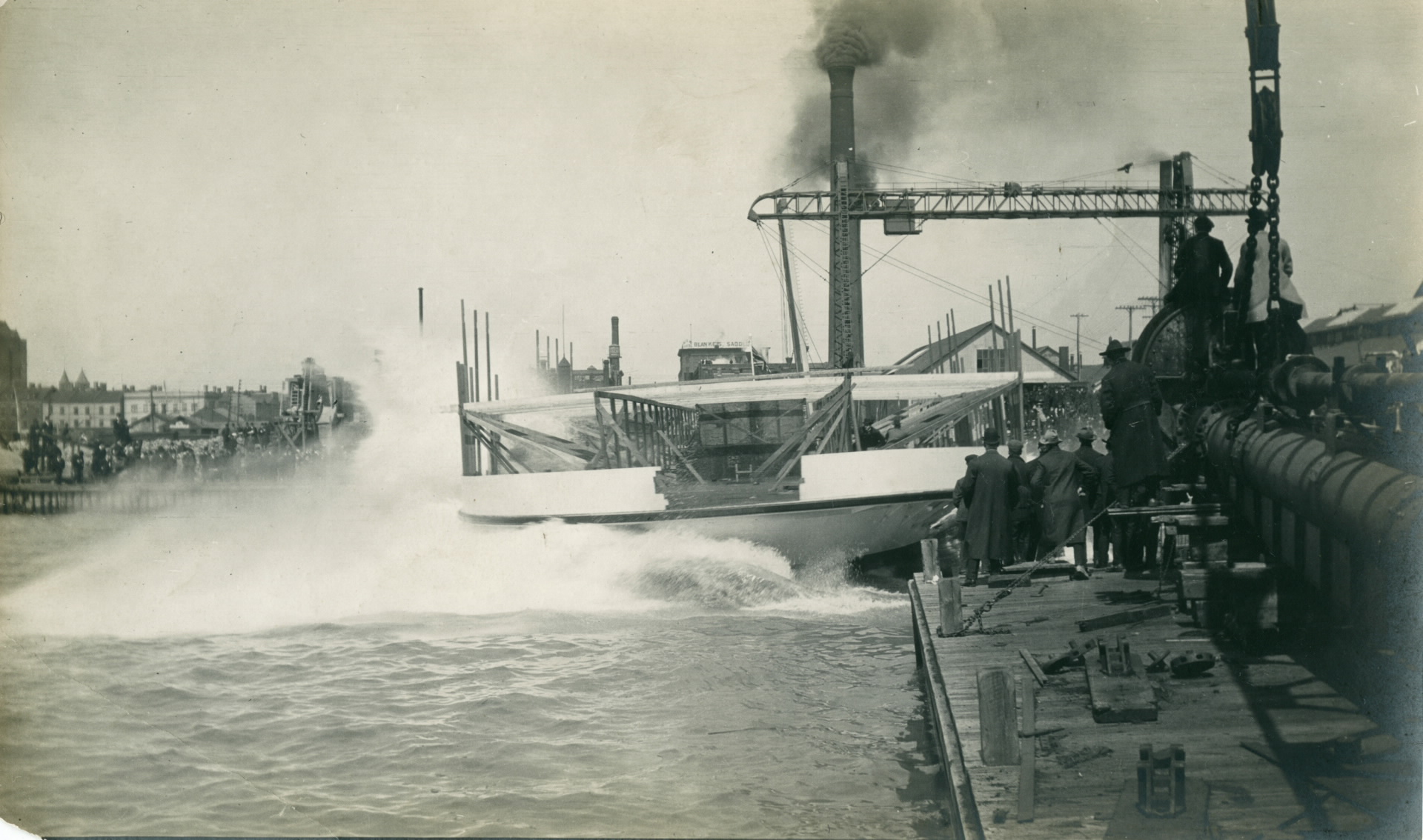
- Bluebell, launched in 1906, served as a ferry in Toronto until 1955

History
- Name: Bluebell
- Operator: Toronto Ferry Company
- Builder: Polson Iron Works, Toronto, Ontario
- Launched: 1906
- Out of service: 1955
- Fate: Sank 1957

General characteristics
- Type: Ferry

Bluebell was a ferry built in Toronto, Ontario, Canada by Polson Iron Works for the Toronto Ferry Company. She was a steam-powered vessel, propelled by side-wheels. She ferried passengers between the Toronto mainland and the Toronto Islands.

She was built in 1906, and acquired by the city in 1927 when its contract with the ferry company expired, and remained in service until 1955. She was converted to a scow in 1957, but sank on her first voyage after her relaunch. She was refloated several times before the hull was sunk as part of the Leslie Spit.

Polson Iron Works finished a sister ship to Bluebell, Trillium, also named after a flower, which underwent a long restoration after being left to sink, and rot, in a lagoon at the Toronto Islands.

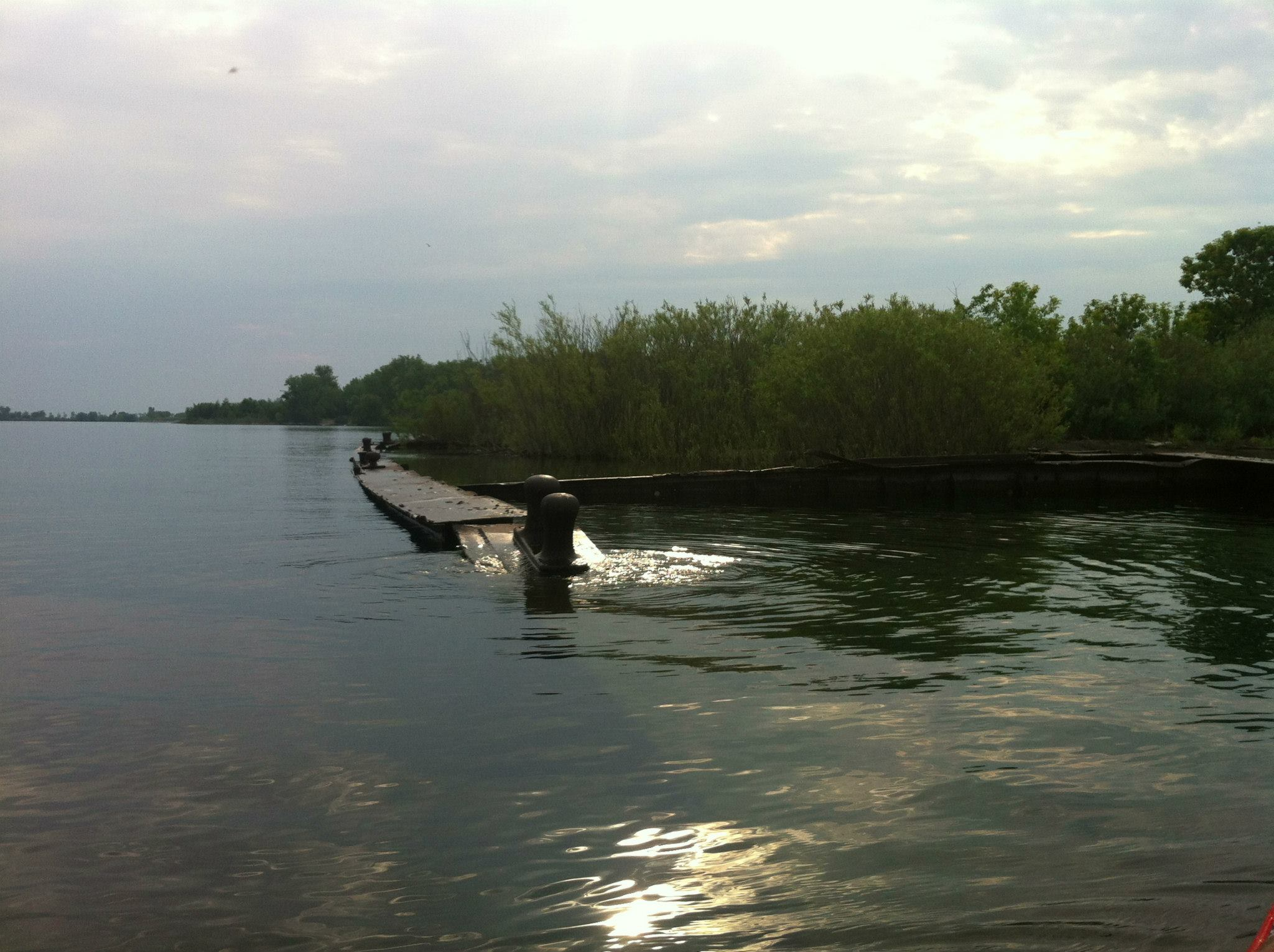
PS Bluebell as of June 2013

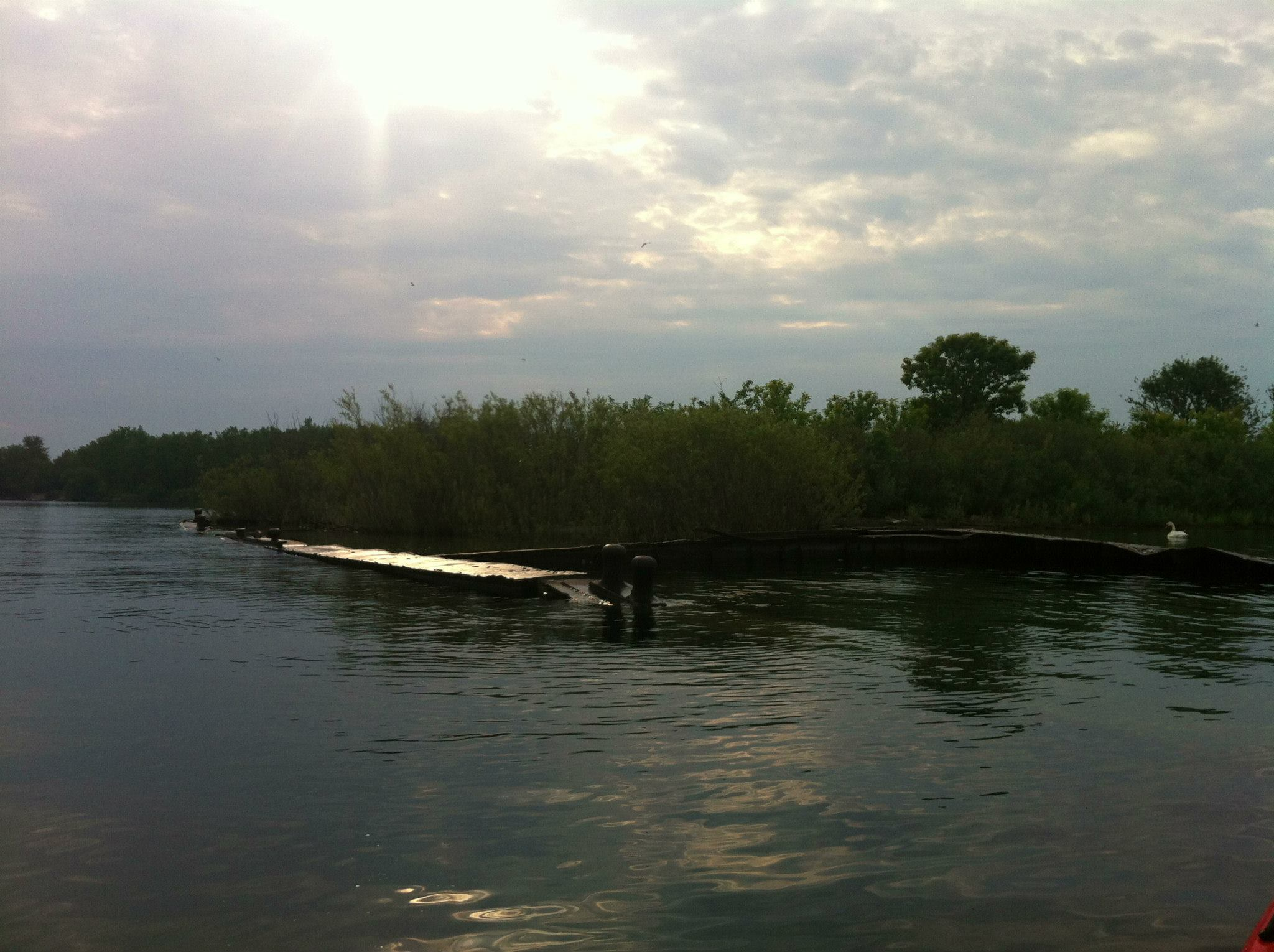
PS Bluebell as of June 2013
