= Sunlight Park =

Former baseball stadium in Toronto, Canada

Coordinates: 43°39′28″N 79°21′07″W

- Interactive map of Sunlight Park
- Former names: Toronto Baseball Grounds
- Location: Queen Street East and west Broadview Avenue
- Capacity: approx 2,200
- Surface: Grass

Construction
- Opened: 1886
- Closed: 1913
- Cost: $7,000.00

Tenant
- Torontos

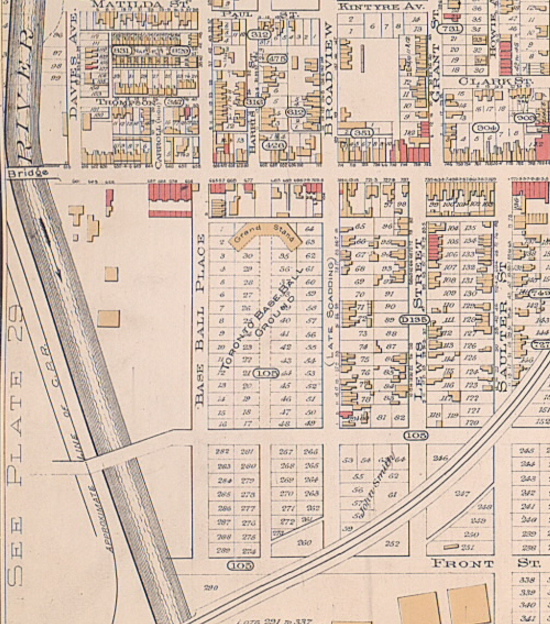
Area of Sunlight Park in 1890

Sunlight Park was the first baseball stadium in Toronto, Ontario, Canada. The all wood structure was built in 1886 at a cost of $7,000 by the International League baseball team the Toronto Baseball Club (renamed the Toronto Maple Leafs in 1902).

It was initially known as the Toronto Baseball Grounds. It stood south of Queen Street East, west of Broadview Avenue, north of Eastern Avenue, on the east side of the Smith Estate near the Don River, and had seating for 2,200 spectators, including a 550-seat reserved section. The stadium's grand opening was held on May 22, 1886 for an afternoon game against the "Rochesters" of Rochester, New York. It came to be known as Sunlight Park after the Lever Brothers' Sunlight Soap Works was built south of Eastern Avenue. The stadium hosted the city’s first professional baseball championship in 1887. The team and league folded in 1890. The Torontos, called the Canucks of the Eastern League, played in the park until 1896 when new owners moved the team to their new Hanlan's Point Stadium. The park was used for local baseball, football, and lacrosse leagues until well into the 20th century (1913), when encroaching industrial uses predominated.

Today the site is a block of condo lofts, a car dealership car-park and the Don Valley Parkway on ramp, Eastern Avenue diversion. The street Sunlight Park Road bears witness to the past, being the remnant Eastern Avenue bridge approach cut by the parkway. The site is bounded by the Don Valley Parkway and the industrial buildings of the former Lever Brothers.

== See also ==
- Rogers Centre
- Exhibition Stadium
- Maple Leaf Stadium
- Christie Pits
