= Toronto Ferry Company =

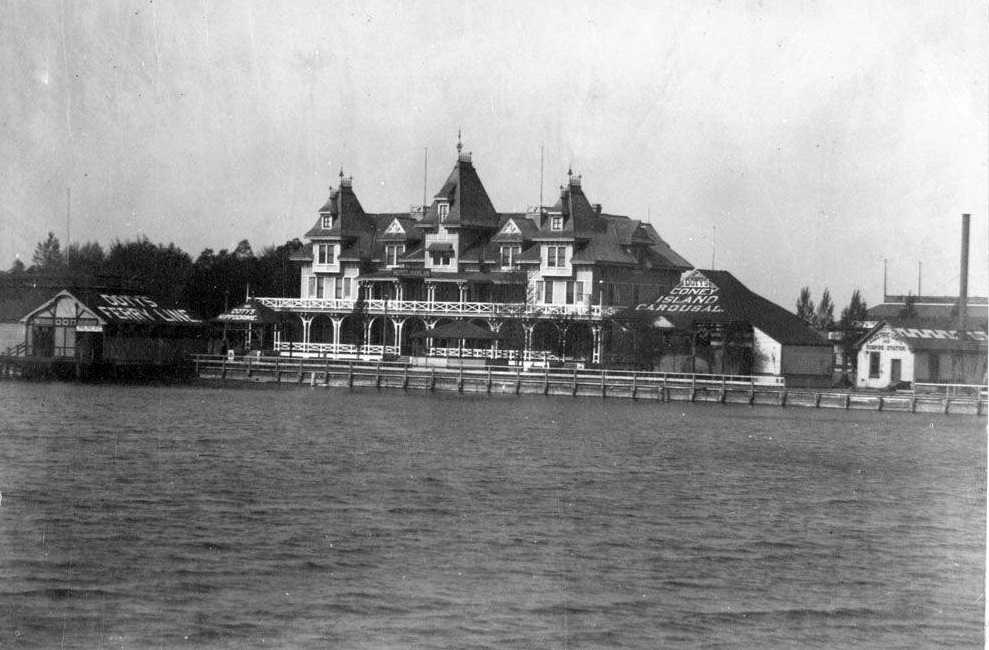
The Doty Ferry Company docks can be seen to the left of the Hanlan Hotel on the Toronto Island.

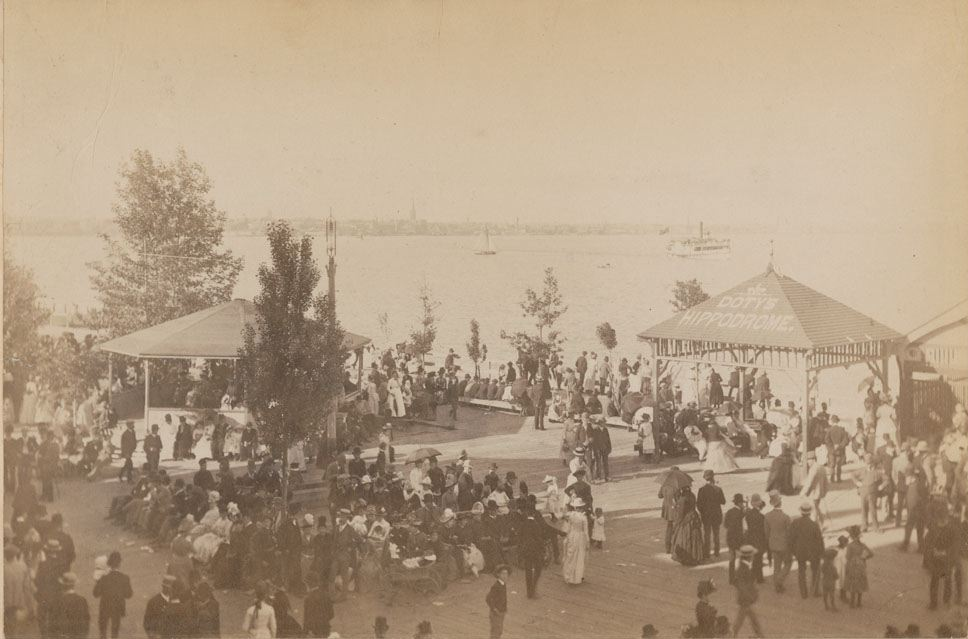
People waiting for the ferry at the Doty Company Ferry docks at Hanlan's Point, circa 1885-95, by F.W. Micklethwaite.

The Toronto Ferry Company was formed from the merger of the Doty Ferry Company with A.J. Tymon's Island Ferry Company, two of Toronto's early ferry operators to Toronto Islands in 1890. TFC was founded and headed by businessman Lol Solman, who owned several attractions on the Toronto Islands including Hanlan's Point Amusement Park, Hanlan's Point Stadium and the Hanlan's Hotel. The company's ferry license and ships as well as the amusement park and other assets were acquired by the Toronto Transportation Commission in 1927. On March 17, 2021, The Toronto Ferry Company Inc was registered under the Ontario Business Corporations Act to Michael A. McLaughlin.

== A.J. Tymon's Island Ferry Company ==
Captain Andrew J. Tymon (1844-?) operated a number of ferries from 1880 until the formation of his own service in the mid-1880s. It later merged with John Doty's (1822-1902) Ferry Company to form TFC in 1892.

Vessels included:

- S.S. Arlington
- S.S. Prince of Wales
- S.S. Jessie L. McEdwards (1882)
- S.S. Theresa (burned 1885)
- S.S. Gertrude
- S.S. Island Queen
- S.S. Truant
- S.S. Kathleen

His son Joseph Tymon (b. 1873) would become a ferry captain for the Toronto Ferry Company.

== John Doty Engine Works ==
John Doty was a Toronto industrialist born in Lewiston, New York in 1822. He moved his young family to Oakville, Ontario in 1851 where he established the town's first foundry and machine shop. By 1875, he, his wife Louisa Jane and two sons, Fred and Frank, moved to Toronto where John established a machine shop at the Yonge Street Wharf, 2 The Esplanade, with offices nearby at 2 Church Street.

In summer 1886 the Doty Brothers operated a ferry to Hanlan's Point. They also used the "palace steamers" Queen City and Canadian to service High Park and the Humber from York and Brock St wharves.

When the business outgrew the capacity of the premises at the Yonge Street Wharf, John Doty leased "about an acre of ground, with some buildings thereon, at the foot of Bathurst Street on the west side, and removed his works to that place in 1881." This was the former site of Dickey, Neill & Company's Soho Foundry.

In addition, The John Doty Engine Works operated a shipyard on the waterfront and established The Doty Ferry Company in 1887 with the purchase of vessels belonging to the Turner Ferry Company to provide a ferry service to the Toronto Island. In 1890, they built sister ships the Mayflower (a nod to the fact that John was a seventh generation descendant of Edward Doty who came over on the Mayflower in 1620) and the Primrose. The two sisters cost $33,000 each to construct and incorporated the latest conveniences and improvements, including electric lights.

In 1888, the Dotys were forced to find a new location for their business when the owner of the property wanted to take over the site. "In 1889, they purchased land on the east side of Bathurst Street between Niagara and Front where they constructed a state-of-the-art plant tailored to their manufacturing needs and purchased a considerable amount of new equipment. The plant started operations in 1891 and was the largest works of its kind in Canada, specializing in the design and manufacturing of marine engines, boilers, and complete vessels, with offices and supply depots at Winnipeg and Vancouver. Doty equipment was very extensively used in the development of the Canadian North West."

Coinciding with the move to the new plant in 1890, was the sale of the Doty Ferry Company to the Toronto Ferry Company, which was incorporated as a joint stock company with financier E.B. Osler as president and Lawrence Soloman as general manager.

John Doty became a shareholder, and the vessels belonging to the Doty Ferry Company were purchased as part of the venture. The Island Park Ferry Company and most of the other vessels in the city's ferry boat business were also acquired, giving the Toronto Ferry Company a virtual monopoly on hauling the public to and from the Island. It was reported that "six of the ferries were built by The John Doty Engine Works."

That same year, The John Doty Engine Company of Toronto (Limited) was organized. The company's officers were: John Doty, President; Daniel Hunter, Vice-President; Franklin H. Doty, General Manager; Frederic W. Doty, Secretary-Treasurer; John Walsh, Assistant Secretary-Treasurer. The following year, at the age of 70, John Doty retired from his business.

Then, on the cusp of achieving so much, there was a downturn in the market. "The compulsory move of the plant in 1891 caused a substantial strain on the company's capital and credit. The financial panic of 1892 caused the Company to go into receivership. It was taken over by the Bertram interests."

The family was forced to sell the John Doty Engine Works to their creditors, Bertram & Co. An announcement in the Globe stated that Bertram would carry on business under the good name of the "Doty Engine Works." The facility operated until 1905 under George and John Bertram as the Bertram Engine Works.

John's sons, Fred and Frank stayed on as managers for a time. This was when they built their hydraulic sand pump, a piece of equipment they would later use under contract to the City for the dredging of the Toronto Harbour.

In 1901, at the age of 79, John Doty was living with his son Fred and family in Goderich, Ontario, where Fred had established the Doty Engine Works of Goderich. Soon after, he moved back to Toronto, boarding at the home of Robert Thomas, an engineer living at 97 Ossington Avenue and employed at the Bertram Engine Works, the new owners of the factory built by John Doty. This would be his last place of residence. On 1 October 1902, at the age of eighty, he died "of the ill health incident to his advanced years."

A list of engines built by John Doty:

- high-pressure steam engine for screw steamer Mascotte 1886
- steam engine for screw steamer Jessie L. McEdwards 1876
- engine for steamer Luella 1876
- engine for steamer Sadie 1885
- ferry and engines - Mayflower and Primrose 1890
- two secondhand Doty compound steam engines would be installed in RMS Segwun during a 1925 conversion

== Docks ==
- Doty Ferry Company docks at Hanlan's Point
- Bay Street Ferry docks (one block west of today's Jack Layton Ferry Terminal)

== Fleet ==
A list of ships operated by the Toronto Ferry Company:

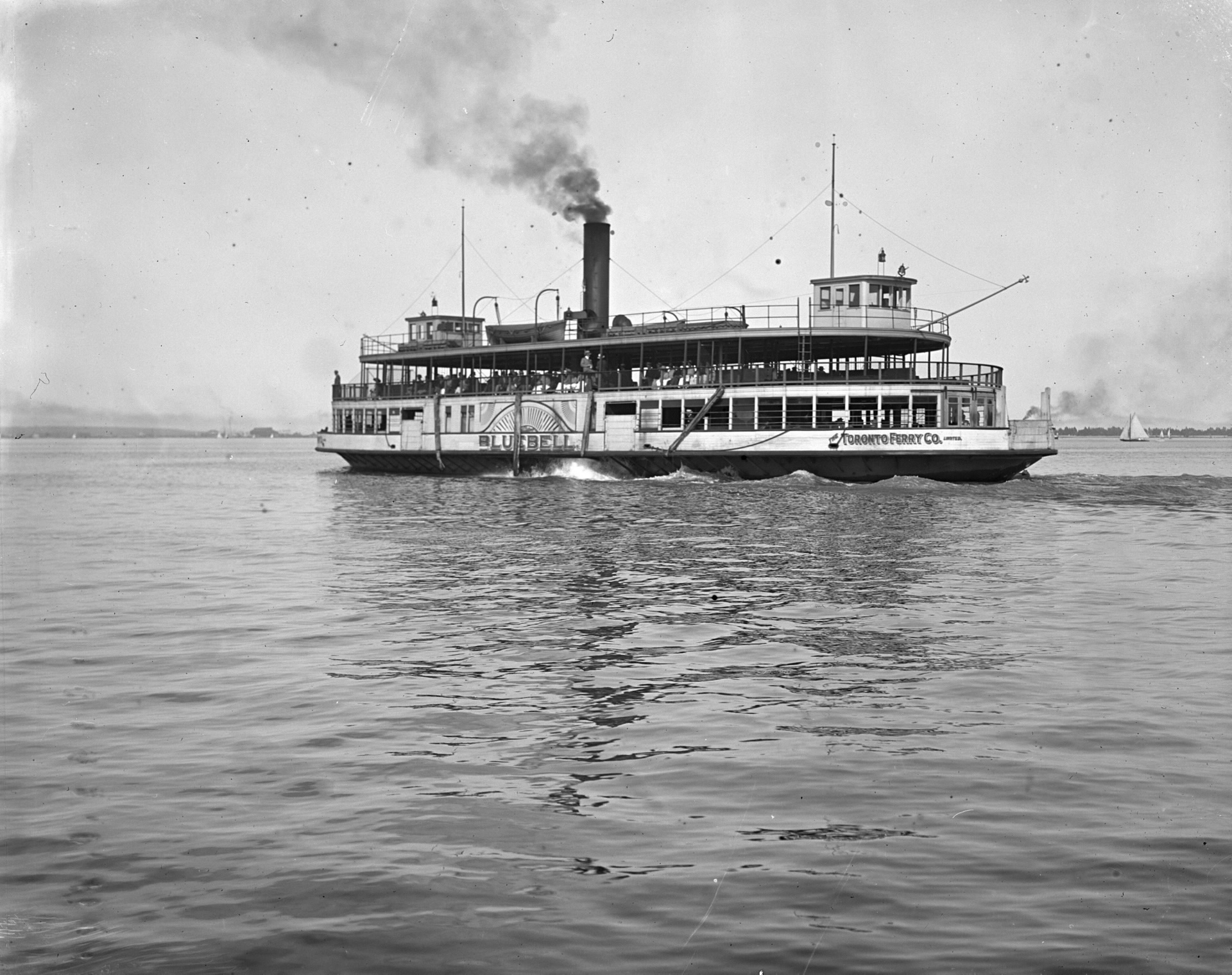
Bluebell ferry in Toronto Harbour 1920

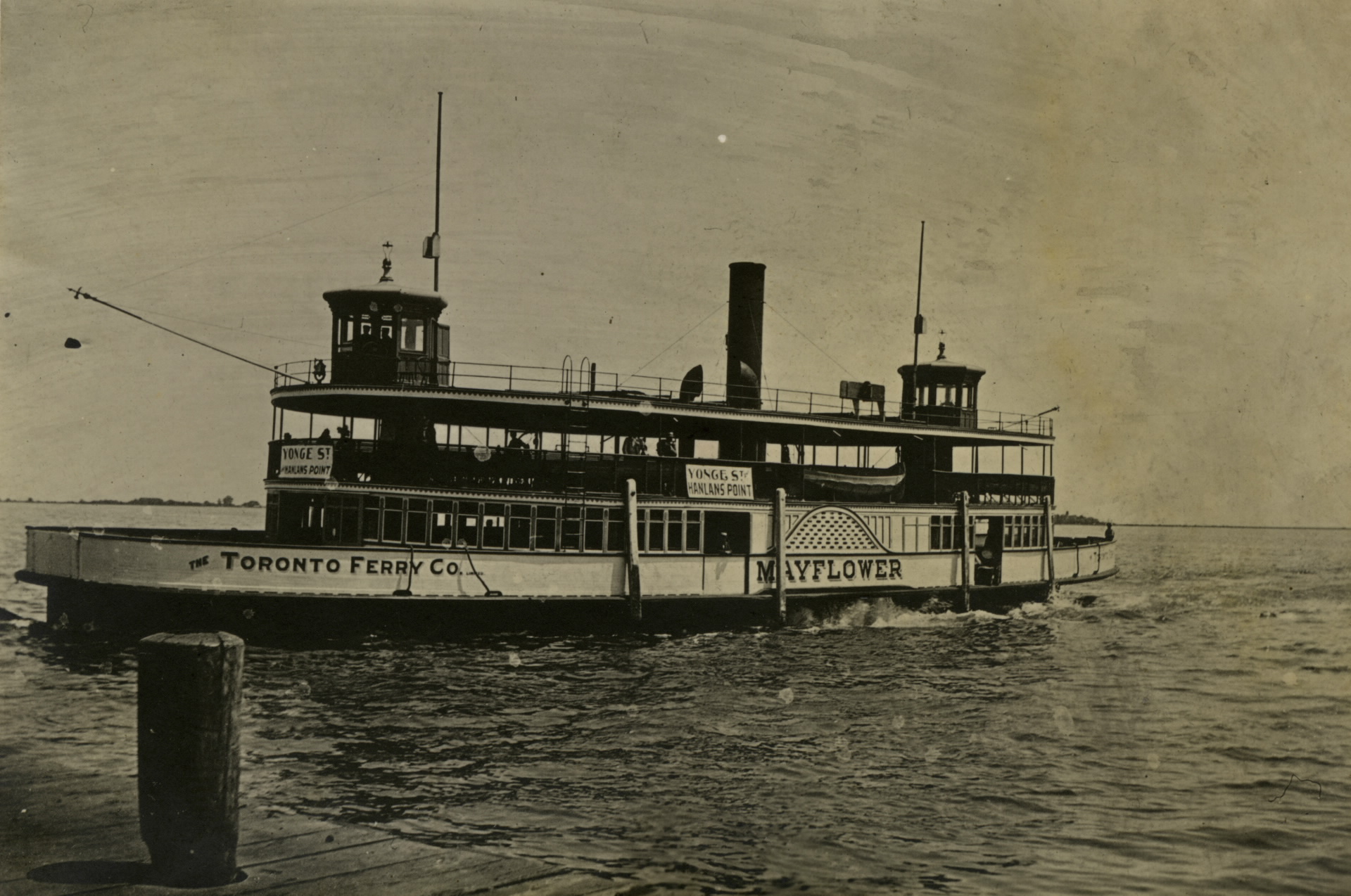
Mayflower ferry in Toronto Harbour, 1890s

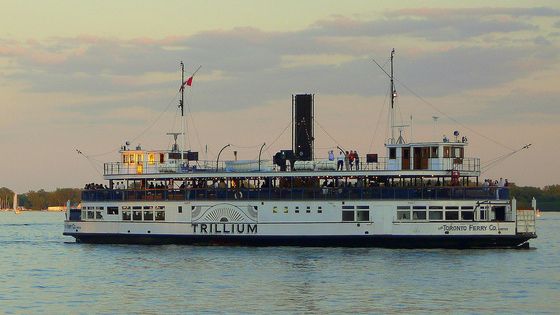
Trillium ferry in Toronto Harbour

Product list and details
Make/Model	Description	# passengers	Year acquired	Year retired	Notes
Mayflower - built by the John Doty Engine Works	ferry	900-1000	1890	1938	Later acquired from the Toronto Ferry Company by E.B. Osler (with acquisition of John Doty Ferry Company and Tymon's Island Ferry Company; became city garbage scow
Primrose built by John Doty Engine Works	ferry	900-1000	1890	1938	sister ship to the Mayflower and later acquired from the Toronto Ferry Company
Bluebell - built by Polson Iron Works Limited for Toronto Ferry Company	side wheeler ferry	N/A	1906	1955	cut down and converted into a scow in 1957
Trillium 1910-1957 - built by Polson Iron Works Limited for Toronto Ferry Company	side wheeler ferry	N/A	1910; 1976	1957	re-enter service 1976 with Metro Parks
Luella - built by W. Armour & Company and John Doty Engine Company	ferry	122	1882	1934
Sadie - built as St. Jean Baptiste for the Turner Ferry Co. by James Andrew of Oakville	double-decked paddle vessel - 112 feet	377	1885	?
Canadian - built for the Turner Ferry Co. by Alexander Clindinning of Toronto	two-decked, double-ended pad-die steamer - 122 feet	340	1882	?
Prouvette Beyer - built for the Turner Ferry Co.	ferry		1882	?
Arlington - built for the A.J. Tymon Ferry Co. in Harwood	single deck screw steamer	100	1878, 1880	?
Jessie McEdwards - built for the A.J. Tymon Ferry Co. by Melancthon Simpson of St. Catharines	single deck screw steamer - 65 feet	116	1876	?
Kathleen - built for the A.J. Tymon Ferry Co. by George Dickson of Toronto	two-decked screw steamer - 84 feet	200	1886	1918
Gertrude - built for the A.J. Tymon Ferry Co. by George Clean of Toronto	two-decked screw steamer - 75 feet	147	1886	?
Island Queen - built for the A.J. Tymon Ferry Co. - Joseph Duval at Port Dalhousie	single-decked screw steamer - 73 feet	148	1882	1918
Ned Hanlan - built for the A.J. Tymon Ferry Co.	ferry		1902	1966
T.J. Clark	ferry		1918	1960
Miss Simcoe	ferry		1918	1929
Lady York	ferry		1918	1929
Aylmer	ferry		1918	1929
Buttercup	ferry		1918	1929
Jasmine	ferry		1918	1929	later renamed Ojibway
Clark Brothers	ferry		1918	1927
John Hanlan - built by John & James Abbey/Abbey Brothers Shipyards of Port Dalhousie	screw steamer	~100	1844	1929	burned and sunk off Sunnyside Park 1929

== See also ==
- Toronto Island ferries
- Toronto Transit Commission
- Toronto Transportation Commission
