= Lol Solman =

Canadian businessman (1863–1931)

Lawrence Solman
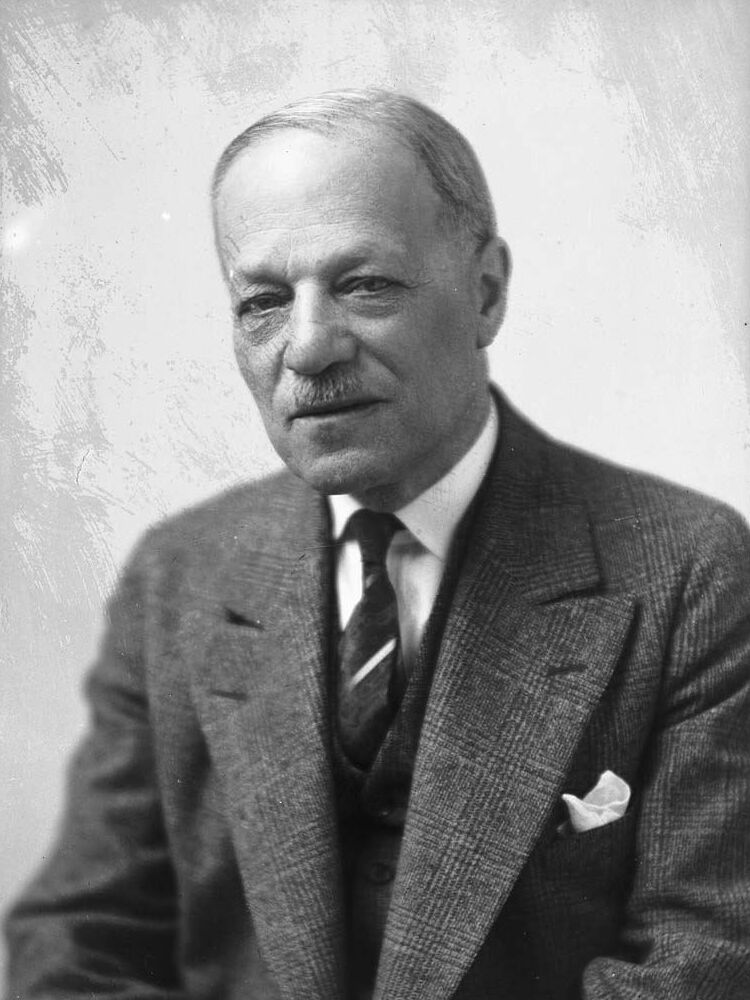
- Solman, c. 1930
- Born: May 14, 1863; Toronto, Canada West
- Died: March 24, 1931 (aged 67); Toronto, Ontario, Canada
- Occupation: businessman

Lawrence "Lol" Solman (May 14, 1863 – March 24, 1931) was a prominent businessman in Toronto, Ontario, Canada.

== Biography ==
Born in Toronto, Solman was educated in public schools. After attending the Mechanic's Institute, he began business in a mail-order operation in Detroit; operated a restaurant at Hanlan's Point; married Emily Hanlan in 1893, sister of noted rower Ned Hanlan and helped him advance in his business career; established Toronto Ferry Company, which held a monopoly on traffic to the Toronto Islands; owner of the Toronto Maple Leafs baseball club; co-founder of the Tecumseh Lacrosse Club; managing director of the Royal Alexandra Theatre, Sunnyside Amusement Park, Hanlan's Hotel, the Hanlan's Point Amusement Park, Hanlan's Point Stadium, and Arena Gardens in Toronto; vice-president of Loews Canadian theatres.

Solman is buried at Mount Pleasant Cemetery, Toronto, while his wife, Emily Durnan Hanlan Solman, is buried at the Hanlan plot at Toronto Necropolis cemetery.

== Gallery ==
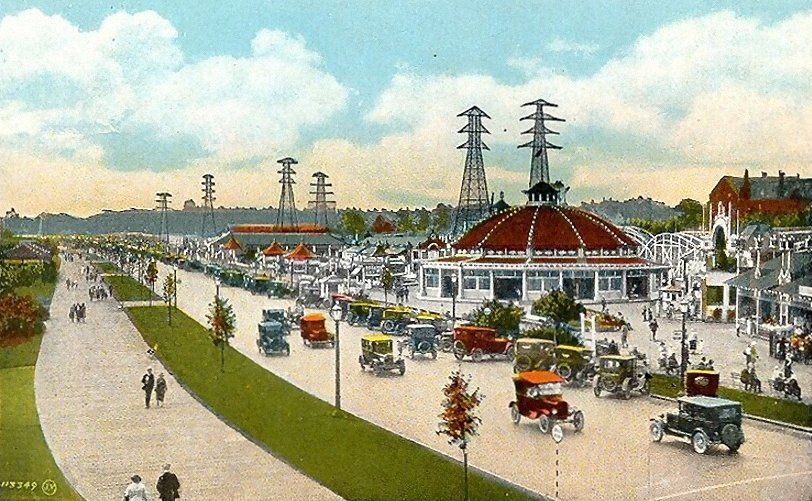
Solman was Managing Director of Toronto's Sunnyside Amusement Park.

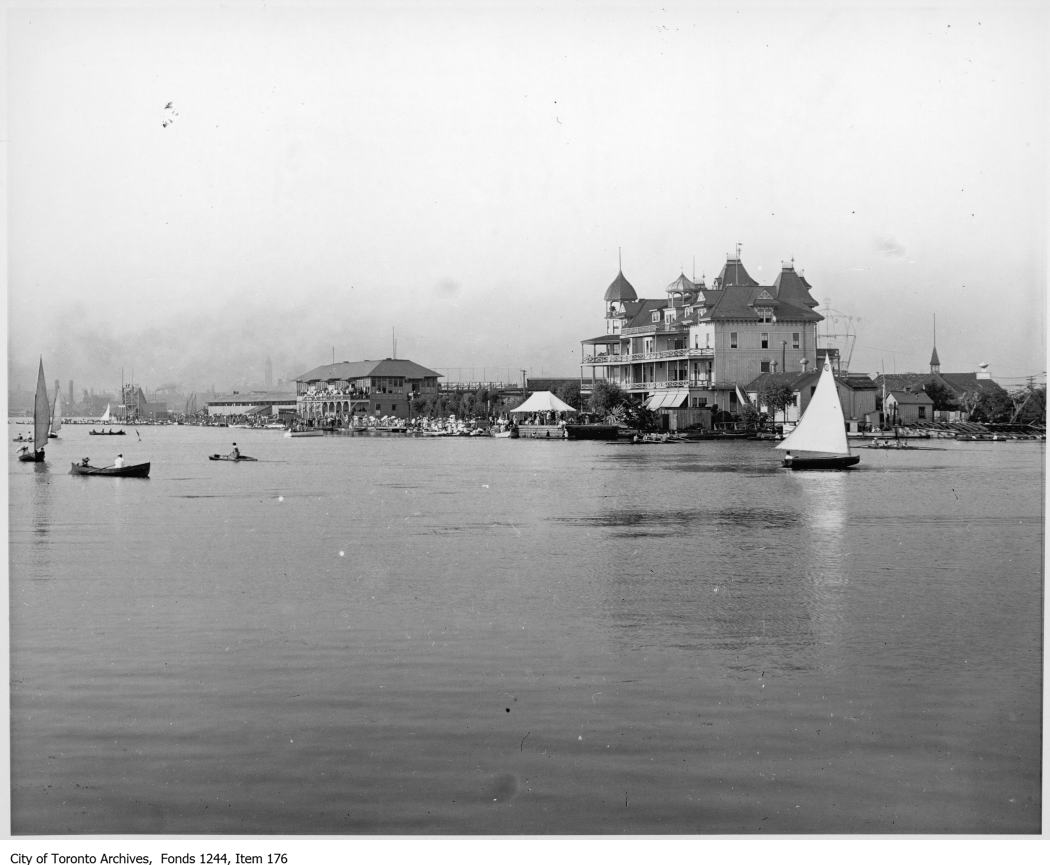
Solman was Managing Director of brother-in-law Ned Hanlon's "Hanlon Hotel" on Toronto Island.

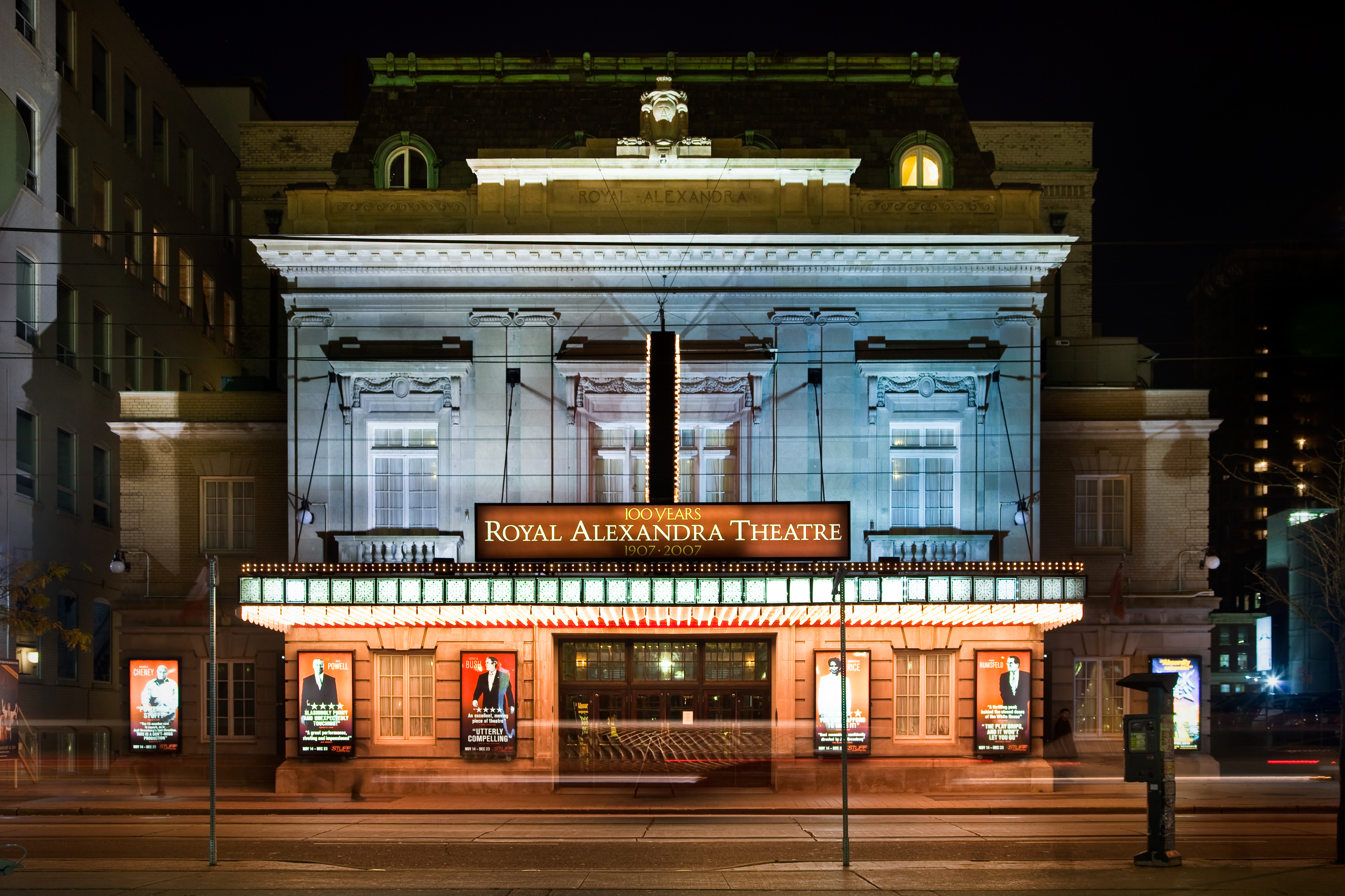
Solman was a partner – along with Stephen S. Haas, Robert Alexander Smith, & Cawthra Mulock – in Toronto's Royal Alexandra Theatre, now a National Historic Site. Lol was the theatre's manager/impresario.

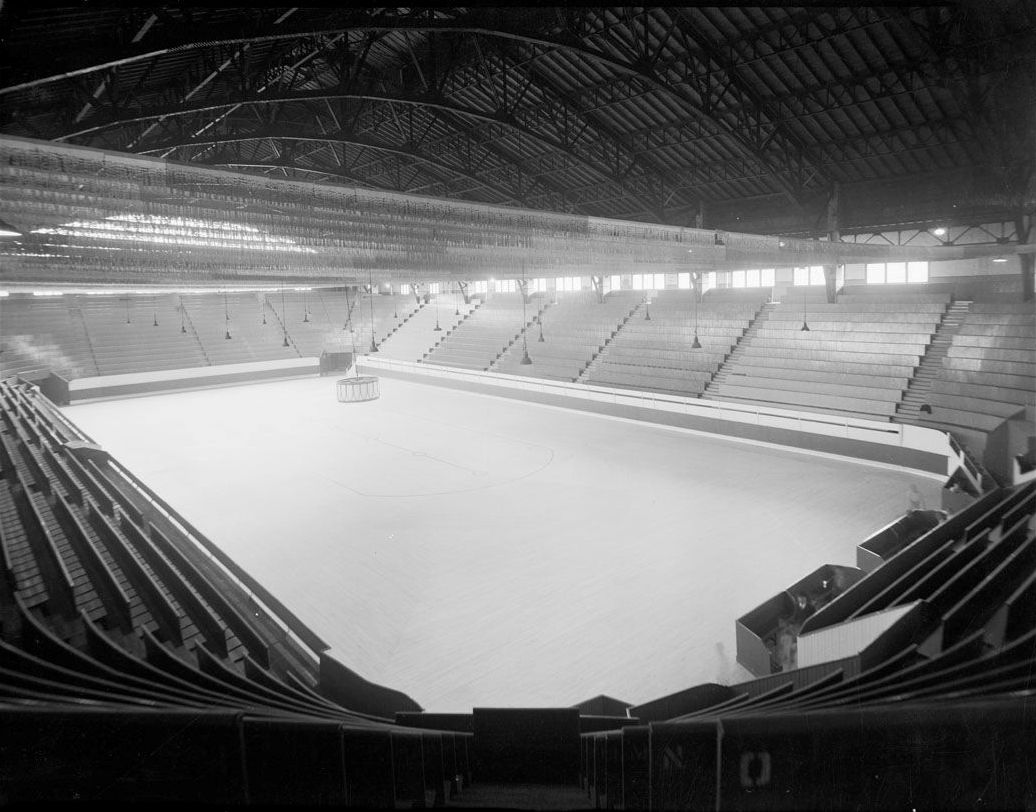
Solman was partner in & managing Director of Toronto's Mutual St. Arena, home of the N.H.L.'s Toronto St. Patricks, who became the Toronto Maple Leafs in 1927.

== Sources ==
- Bossin, Hy. "Stars of David: Toronto, 1856-1965". Canadian Jewish Congress, 1957
- "Lawrence Solman is dead following long illness," Toronto Star, March 24, 1931, p. 1.
