= Toronto Maple Leafs (International League) =

- 1896–1967; Toronto, Ontario

Minor league affiliations
- Class: Triple-A (1946–1967); Double-A (1912–1945); A (1902–1911); not classified (1896–1901)
- League: International League (1896–1967)

Major league affiliations
- Team: Boston Red Sox (1947; 1965–67); Washington Senators (1964); Milwaukee Braves (1962–64); Cleveland Indians (1960–61); St. Louis Browns (1951–52); Philadelphia Phillies (1948–50); Pittsburgh Pirates (1942–1944); Philadelphia Athletics (1940–41; 1945–46); Cincinnati Reds (1934–35); Detroit Tigers (1932–33)

Minor league titles
- League titles (10): 1897; 1902; 1912; 1917; 1918; 1926; 1934; 1960; 1965; 1966

Team data
- Previous names: Toronto Maple Leafs (1891-1967); Toronto Baseball Club (1885–1890)
- Ballpark: Maple Leaf Stadium (1926–67); Hanlan's Point Stadium (1897–1900; 1908–25); Diamond Park (1901–07, 1909); Sunlight Park (1896–97); by Toronto Baseball Club (1886–1890); Jarvis Street Lacrosse Grounds by Toronto Baseball Club (1885)

The Toronto Maple Leafs were a high-level minor league baseball club located in Toronto, Ontario, Canada, which played from 1896 to 1967.

While the Maple Leafs had working agreements with numerous Major League Baseball clubs after the introduction of farm systems in the 1930s, they achieved great success as an unaffiliated club during the 1950s, when they were the strongest team on the field and in attendance in the Triple-A International League. The 1902, 1918, 1920, 1926, and 1960 teams were recognized as being among the 100 greatest minor league teams of all time.

Toronto was without professional baseball from 1968 to 1976, when the American League added the Toronto Blue Jays via the 1977 Major League Baseball expansion.

== History ==
=== The first club ===
The first Toronto baseball organization, the Toronto Baseball Club, played in the Canadian League in 1885, playing its home games at William Cawthra's Jarvis Street Lacrosse Grounds (Old Lacrosse Grounds) at the northwest corner of Jarvis and Wellesley Street. It finished the season in third place. The next year, renamed the Toronto Canucks, the team left the Canadian League along with Hamilton to join the original International League (also known as the International Association), where it played from 1886 to 1890. The baseball stadium that would come to be known as Sunlight Park was built for the team and opened on May 22, 1886, with Toronto defeating Rochester 10–3 in front of 3,000 fans. Toronto won the pennant in 1887, behind 33-game-winner Edward Nicholas Cannonball Crane, who also led the team in hitting with a .428 batting average (walks were counted as hits for that season). The league folded in July 1890.

=== The Maple Leafs return ===
In 1895, Toronto resurfaced in the original Eastern League (which in 1902 was designated Class A, at that time one level below Major League Baseball), where it played through 1911. The club relocated to Albany, New York for part of the 1896 season, but started and finished the year in Toronto. In 1897, the team began playing its home games on the Toronto Islands at Hanlan's Point Stadium. The stadium and the team were owned by the Toronto Ferry Company.

In 1900, a group of 52 Toronto businessmen, spearheaded by Ed Barrow and Ed Mack, a tailor and former ballplayer, bought the team for CA$6,000. The club constructed a new stadium at Liberty Street and Fraser Avenue, called Diamond Park. Led by Barrow, the Leafs won the International League pennant in 1902 with a record of 85–42.

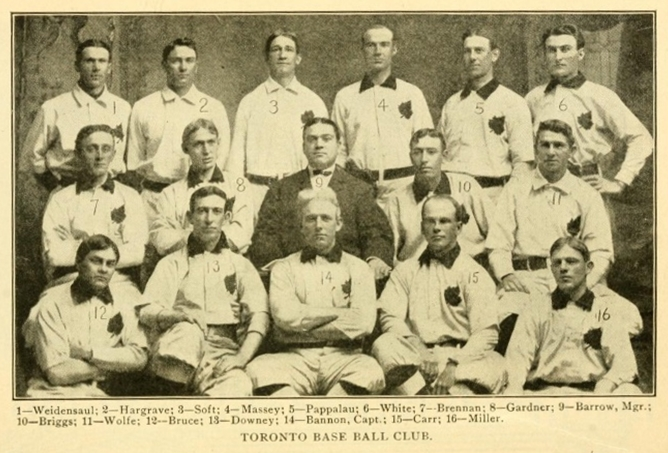
The 1902 Maple Leafs

The team faltered after its championship season, falling to eighth place by 1905. Debt holders called in their loans and the team was purchased by James J. McCaffery, who served as team president from 1908 until his death in 1922, and Lawrence "Lol" Solman, president from 1922 to 1931. Former major league star Joe Kelley took the reins as manager in 1907 and the team's fortunes immediately turned around. Kelley was drafted by the Boston Doves the next season, when the Leafs returned to Hanlan's Point Stadium, but Kelley rejoined the club in 1909 and guided the team to the championship in 1912.

Hanlan's Point Stadium burned down in August 1909, so the team had to finish its season back at Diamond Park. In time for the 1910 season, a new and larger stadium was ready at Hanlan's Point. It would serve as their home until 1926.

In 1912, minor league baseball was reorganized and a new top level classification, Double-A, was created. On Sept. 5, 1914, soon after Canada entered the First World War, a 19-year-old Babe Ruth was pitching for the Providence Grays in a game against the Maple Leafs. The Bambino threw a shutout game, beating the Maple Leafs 9-0, but most notably, he hit his first professional home run to cash in three of those runs.

The Eastern League moved up to Double-A and changed its name to become the International League. The Maple Leafs continued as members of the International League for the next 55 years, with the league being reclassified as Triple-A in 1946.

42 year old Nap Lajoie and his .380 batting average helped lead the Maple Leafs to another championship in 1917. Manager Dan Howley first joined the team in 1918, leading the Leafs to the pennant that year. Canadian Mooney Gibson became manager in 1919, and was called to the major leagues after one season. The 1920 Leafs won 108 games, and had what would be the highest single season winning percentage in the history of the franchise at .701, but finished second to the powerhouse Baltimore Orioles. Through the 1920s, the team averaged 93 wins a season, but won only one pennant.

In 1926, the Maple Leafs moved to the new Maple Leaf Stadium, which would be their home for the next 42 seasons, and capped off the season with the championship, with Howley back as manager. The following year, the National Hockey League team, the Toronto St. Patricks, changed its own nickname to Maple Leafs.

The Maple Leafs struggled through the 1930s, both on and off the field. In 1931, ownership of Maple Leaf Stadium passed to the Toronto Harbour Commission after the club was unable to pay taxes and other debts. Shortly after, club president Solman died, with George Oakley succeeding him in May 1931. At the same time, J. P. Bickell joined the team's board of directors. The 1932 Maple Leafs lost 113 games and only attracted 50,000 fans through the entire year. James A. Dunn, vice-president and second-largest shareholder after Oakley, died in August 1933. The one bright spot was 1934, when the team won the league championship under manager Ike Boone before losing the Junior World Series in nine games. A few months later, in December 1934, Oakley died.

=== Gardiner and Ross keep the Leafs in Toronto ===
After George Oakley's death, his son Cliff Oakley succeeded him as team president. Following the 1936 season, Oakley publicly commented that baseball was in trouble in Toronto and that something would have to change. A few months later, he and general manager Leman were approached by Joe Cambria, former owner of the Albany Senators, who wanted to buy the team and move it to Albany, New York.

A group of local investors, headed by stockbroker Percy Gardiner and former lieutenant-governor of Ontario William Donald Ross, bought the Leafs in January 1937 to keep them in Toronto. Oakley immediately stepped down as president and was succeeded by Donald G. Ross, lawyer and son of William Donald Ross. Howley was brought back as manager, returning to the position he had held three times previously: in 1918, 1923–1926, and 1933.

The team lost a lot of money, and wasn't very successful on the field, drawing about 60,000 paying fans a year during a three-year stretch from 1939 to 1941 when the Leafs finished in eighth place each season. Control of the team passed to Peter Campbell, who would be president until his death in 1949. The Leafs' .305 winning percentage in 1941 was the lowest in franchise history. Campbell negotiated a working agreement with the Pittsburgh Pirates in 1942, and a year later the team won the International League pennant—its first in 16 years. By 1947, the team was back to eighth place. Joe Ziegler then became general manager and is credited with turning the team's fortunes around, with such promotional innovations as 20-cent hot dogs and Sunday games. Under Ziegler, the Leafs set a new franchise attendance record with 353,247 customers in 1949—double what it had been two years earlier, despite a fifth-place finish. Ziegler resigned at the end of the 1951 season, soon after the team came under new ownership.

=== Jack Kent Cooke era ===
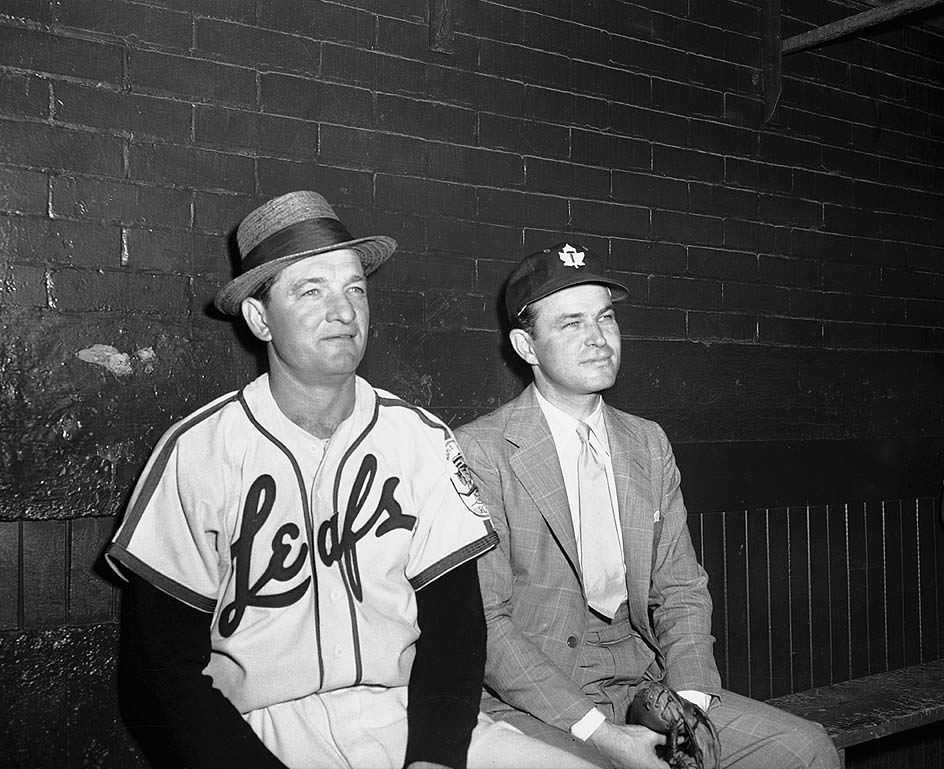
Jack Kent Cooke (right) swaps hats with Joe Becker, who managed the Leafs in 1951–52.

In July 1951, Jack Kent Cooke became the new owner of the Maple Leafs, and succeeded Ross as president. Under Cooke's ownership, the Leafs were one of the flagship franchises of the IL, leading the league in attendance every year from 1952 to 1956. In his first home game as owner, Cooke offered free hot dogs and drinks to everyone in the park. Within a week, he had brought in Victor Borge and Gloria DeHaven for guest appearances. At another game that week, he provided free orchids from Hawaii to the first 3,000 women in the park. An opera company and free comic books for children under 14 were scheduled for another game that week which was rained out. Cooke had suggestion boxes installed throughout the stadium and introduced music over the public address system between innings. He also announced he would hire female ushers for the next season and hired a flagpole sitter who was supposed to remain at the top of the pole until the Leafs made the first division. Over the 10-year span from 1951 to 1960, the Maple Leafs drew 3.2 million spectators, peaking in 1952 with 446,040 fans in attendance (which went to more than 500,000 with the playoffs included) to see a team which finished in fourth place.

Nine days after Cooke became owner, the team announced it had signed its first African American players, pitcher Leon Day and catcher Charlie White.

Cooke negotiated an affiliation with the St. Louis Browns for the 1952 season. With his focus on entertainment, Cooke had often been compared to Browns' owner Bill Veeck. The arrangement with the Browns lasted only one season.

However, despite their strong start, attendance never again came close to matching the 1952 numbers, even with pennant-winning seasons under managers Luke Sewell in 1954, Bruno Betzel in 1956, and Dixie Walker in 1957. The pennant-winning 1960 Leafs, a Cleveland affiliate, won 100 games with a league-record 32 shutouts under manager Mel McGaha, but attendance figures were flat from the previous season, when the Leafs had finished in eighth place. It was also in 1960 that Sparky Anderson first joined the team as a middle infielder. He went on to play with the Leafs until 1964 when he became manager.

=== Final years ===
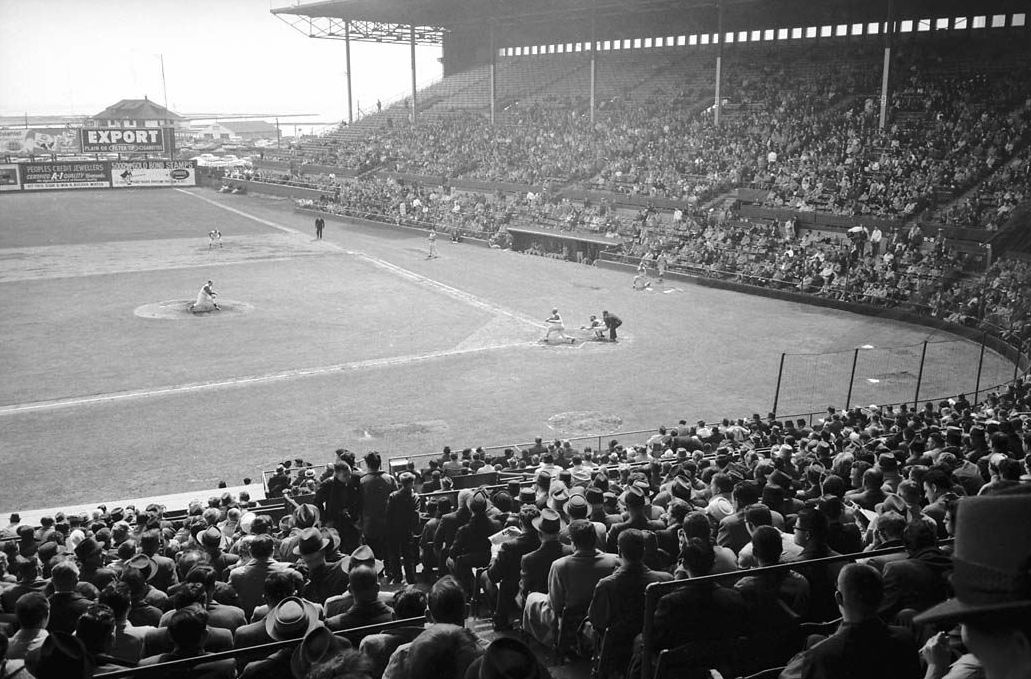
1961 Home opener.

In 1961, Cooke left Canada to become a U.S. citizen, naming Harry Kimber club president. Cooke sold the team in January 1964 to a syndicate led by Robert L. Hunter and Sam Starr for a reported $50,000. Former co-owner Gardiner returned to the Leafs as a director. Hunter and Starr launched a drive for community ownership, selling shares in Toronto (Community) Baseball Ltd., although there was little interest.

In 1965 the Boston Red Sox became the parent club and another future Baseball Hall of Fame manager, Dick Williams, replaced Anderson at the Leafs' helm. Williams then led them to consecutive Governors' Cup titles in 1965 and 1966. Despite the championship season, the Leafs lost $168,000 in 1965. Gardiner wrote a personal cheque for $100,000 to cover the shortfall, with the balance being paid by other members of the board. Meanwhile, the deterioration of Maple Leaf Stadium, regular broadcasts of major league games on television, and other factors drove attendance down to only 67,216 in 1967. According to Hunter, the team lost about $500,000 over its last four seasons in Toronto. The final home game, on Labour Day Monday, September 4, 1967, drew a paid attendance of 802.

During their last season, Hunter was in discussions to sell the club, hoping to find an owner to keep the team in Toronto. The asking price was $60,000. Maple Leaf Gardens Limited, owner of the Toronto Maple Leafs of the National Hockey League, held negotiations to purchase the club, but the deal ultimately fell apart due to concerns about the team's stadium, which needed up to $250,000 in repairs and whose owner wanted $4 million to purchase it. Harold Ballard, part owner of MLGL, said that the company's interest was due in part to help position themselves to go after a Major League Baseball franchise for Toronto.

After the season, the team was sold to Walter Dilbeck, a real estate developer from Evansville, Indiana, for $65,000. On October 17, 1967, the directors of the International League approved the transfer of the Maple Leafs franchise to Louisville, Kentucky, where the team competed as the Louisville Colonels starting in 1968. After just five seasons, the club moved again, to Pawtucket, Rhode Island, in 1973, where it operated as the Pawtucket Red Sox through the 2020 season after which the club moved to Worcester, Massachusetts, to become the Worcester Red Sox for the 2021 season.

The team's baseball stadium was demolished in 1968.

In 1969, the year after the demise of the Triple-A Leafs, a new Toronto Maple Leafs began play as an amateur team belonging to the Ontario-only Intercounty Baseball League at another diamond located in Christie Pits Park.

Major League Baseball arrived in the city of Toronto during the next wave of expansion, in 1977, with the Toronto Blue Jays.

== Championships ==
Toronto won the Eastern League/International League pennant 12 times: 1887, 1902, 1907, 1912, 1917, 1918, 1926, 1943, 1954, 1956, 1957, and 1960. The team won the Governors' Cup four times: 1934, 1960, 1965, and 1966 (finalists in 1943, 1955, 1956, 1958), and won the Junior World Series in 1907 and 1926 (finalists in 1917, 1934, and 1960).

== International League MVPs ==
=== Most valuable player ===
- 1934 – Ike Boone
- 1954 – Elston Howard
- 1956 – Mike Goliat
- 1958 – Rocky Nelson
- 1960 – Jim King
- 1965 – Joe Foy (also rookie of the year)

=== Most valuable pitcher ===
- 1955 – Jack Crimian
- 1956 – Lynn Lovenguth
- 1957 – Don Johnson
- 1960 – Al Cicotte
- 1966 – Gary Waslewski

== Batting titles ==
Members of the Maple Leafs won the league batting title 16 times:

- 1886 – Jon Morrison, .346
- 1887 – Cannonball Crane, .428 †
- 1895 – Judson Smith, .373
- 1898 – Buck Freeman, .347
- 1899 – Jim Bannon, .341
- 1906 – Jack Thoney, .294
- 1907 – Jack Thoney, .329
- 1909 – Myron Grimshaw, .309
- 1910 – Jack Slattery, .310
- 1915 – Morrie Rath, .332
- 1917 – Nap Lajoie, .380
- 1928 – Dale Alexander, .380
- 1934 – Ike Boone, .372
- 1958 – Rocky Nelson, .326
- 1965 – Joe Foy, .302
- 1966 – Reggie Smith, .320

† Bases on balls counted as hits for the 1887 season

== Hall of fame ==
Fifteen members of the Maple Leafs have been inducted into the National Baseball Hall of Fame:

- Sparky Anderson
- Ed Barrow
- Dan Brouthers
- Leon Day
- Hugh Duffy
- Charlie Gehringer
- Burleigh Grimes
- Carl Hubbell
- Willie Keeler
- Joe Kelley
- Ralph Kiner
- Nap Lajoie
- Tony Lazzeri
- Heinie Manush
- Dick Williams

Fourteen team members have been inducted into the International League Hall of Fame: John Berly, Bruno Betzel, Ike Boone, Jack Dunn, Luke Hamlin, Dan Howley, Rocky Nelson, Steve O'Neill, Eddie Onslow, Dick Porter, Dick Rudolph, George Selkirk, George Stallings, and Dixie Walker.

== Team records ==
- Maple Leafs Owner Jack Kent Cooke was named the Sporting News Minor League Executive of the Year, 1952
- Games, career (player): 1,077, Mike Goliat
- Games, career (manager): 1,159, Dan Howley
- Winning streak: 19 (1925)
- Losing streak: 14 (1932)

=== Hitting ===
- Hits, season: 236, Dale Alexander (1928)
- Hits, career: 1,111, Eddie Onslow
- Runs, season: 134, Mike Slattery (1887)
- Runs, career: 582, Lew Morton
- Home runs, season: 43, Rocky Nelson (1958)
- Home runs, career: 138, Mike Goliat
- Runs batted in, season: 144, Dale Alexander (1928)
- Runs batted in, career: 556, Mike Goliat
- Batting average, season: .380 † (tie) Nap Lajoie (1917), Dale Alexander (1928)
- Batting average, career (min 1,000 at-bats): .360, Dale Alexander

† Excludes 1887 season when bases on balls were counted as hits

=== Pitching ===
- Wins, season: 33 (tie), Cannonball Crane (1887), Albert Atkisson (1888)
- Wins, career: 120, Dick Rudolph
- ERA, season: 1.16, Urban Shocker (1916)
- Strikeouts, season: 307, Albert Atkisson (1888)
- Strikeouts, game: 15, Ernie Broglio (1958)

Source: Baseball's Back in Town by Louis Cauz, Controlled Media Corporation Inc., 1977

== Notable players ==
- Goody Rosen – Major League Baseball All-Star outfielder
- Dick Conger (1921–1970) - major league baseball pitcher
- Benny Kauff – star of the Federal League 1914–1915
- Bob Elliott – National League MVP 1947
- Hank Biasatti aka Hank Biasetti – played basketball with Toronto Huskies of B.A.A. 1946/47
- Jim Konstanty – National League MVP 1950
- Sam Jethroe – National League Rookie of the Year 1950
- Bobo Holloman – threw no-hitter in first MLB start 1953
- Elston Howard – American League MVP 1963
- Rico Carty – National League batting champion 1970
- Sparky Lyle – American League Cy Young Award winner 1977
- Phil Roof – played for Toronto Blue Jays 1977
- Reggie Smith – 7 time MLB All-Star
- Leon Day – Hall of Fame Negro league baseball pitcher

== Affiliations ==
The Maple Leafs were affiliated with the following major league teams:

Year	Affiliation(s)
1932–33	Detroit Tigers
1934–35	Cincinnati Reds
1940–41; 1945–46	Philadelphia Athletics
1942–44	Pittsburgh Pirates
1947; 1965–67	Boston Red Sox
1948–50	Philadelphia Phillies
1951–52	St. Louis Browns
1960	Cleveland Indians
1962–63	Milwaukee Braves
1964	Braves/Washington Senators
1965-67	Boston Red Sox

== See also ==
- List of Toronto Maple Leafs no-hitters

Preceded by Seattle Rainiers	Boston Red Sox; Triple-A affiliate 1965–1967	Succeeded by Louisville Colonels
Preceded by Louisville Colonels	Boston Red Sox; Triple-A affiliate 1947 (with Louisville Colonels)	Succeeded by Louisville Colonels
