= Atwater Park =

Baseball park in Montreal, Quebec

Atwater Park (French: Parc Atwater) was a baseball park in Downtown Montreal, Quebec, Canada (on the border with Westmount). It was the home grounds of several Montreal minor league teams from about 1890 through 1927, including the Montreal Royals beginning in 1922. After the 1927 season, the Royals ended their lease and moved to Delorimier Stadium. It was also the home field of local amateur baseball leagues.

The ballpark's address was 1500 Atwater Avenue, the street which bordered it on the northeast (third base) side. Other boundaries were Saint-Catherine Street West (southeast, left field); Montreal Arena (until it burned in 1918) and Wood Avenue (southwest, right field); and De Maisonneuve Boulevard (originally Western Avenue) (northwest, first base).

The park continued to be used by local amateur leagues, into the 1950s, as well as the lacrosse team associated with the Montreal Shamrocks hockey team. After the ballpark was demolished, it was used as a parking lot for the Montreal Forum, which sat across the street to the northeast.

The ballpark site now contains Place Alexis Nihon, a shopping center and office building complex built in the mid-1960s.

== Sources ==
- Peter Filichia, Professional Baseball Franchises, Facts on File, 1993.
- Phil Lowry, Green Cathedrals, several editions.
- Michael Benson, Ballparks of North America, McFarland, 1989.
