= Hanlan's Point Stadium =

Former baseball stadium in Toronto, Canada

Coordinates: 43.6270°N 79.3916°W

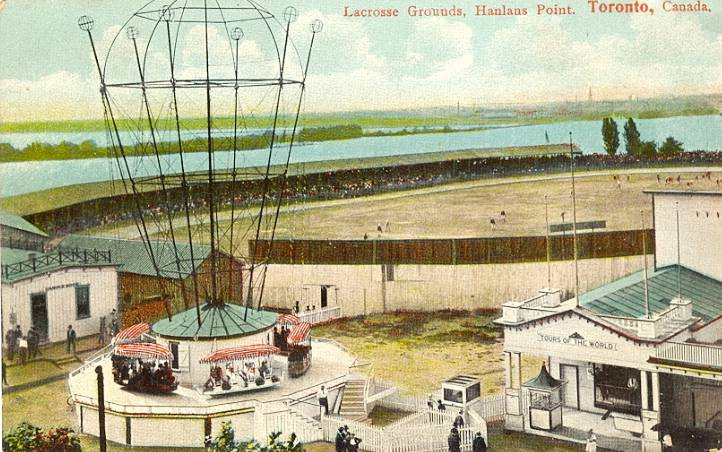
- Interactive map of Hanlan's Point Stadium
- Location: Hanlan's Point, Toronto Islands, Canada
- Owner: Toronto Ferry Company
- Surface: Grass

Construction
- Groundbreaking: 1896?
- Opened: 1897
- Closed: 1937

Tenant
- Toronto Maple Leafs baseball club

Hanlan's Point Stadium was a baseball stadium and lacrosse grounds in Toronto, Ontario, Canada. It was erected in 1897 at Hanlan's Point on the Toronto Islands for the minor league Toronto Maple Leafs baseball club. It was destroyed by fire twice, in 1903, and again in 1909. Adjacent to the Hanlan's Point Amusement Park, the site was in use for various sports until the late 1930s.

== History ==
Initially, a grandstand and bleachers were built on the site. When the Toronto Ferry Company acquired the Leafs, it moved the team from Sunlight Park near the mouth of the Don River on the mainland to the Hanlan's Point field on the islands. The Toronto Ferry Company built a new semi-circular grandstand, with the old grandstand converted to bleachers. The Maple Leafs played at the stadium until 1901, when they moved to Diamond Park on the mainland. The Hanlan's stadium and the adjacent bar, both managed by Lol Solman, were destroyed by a fire on September 8, 1903. The stadium was rebuilt and reopened on May 24, 1904 and it was reported that there were so many people on the reopening, that the ferries couldn't carry everyone to the Toronto Islands.

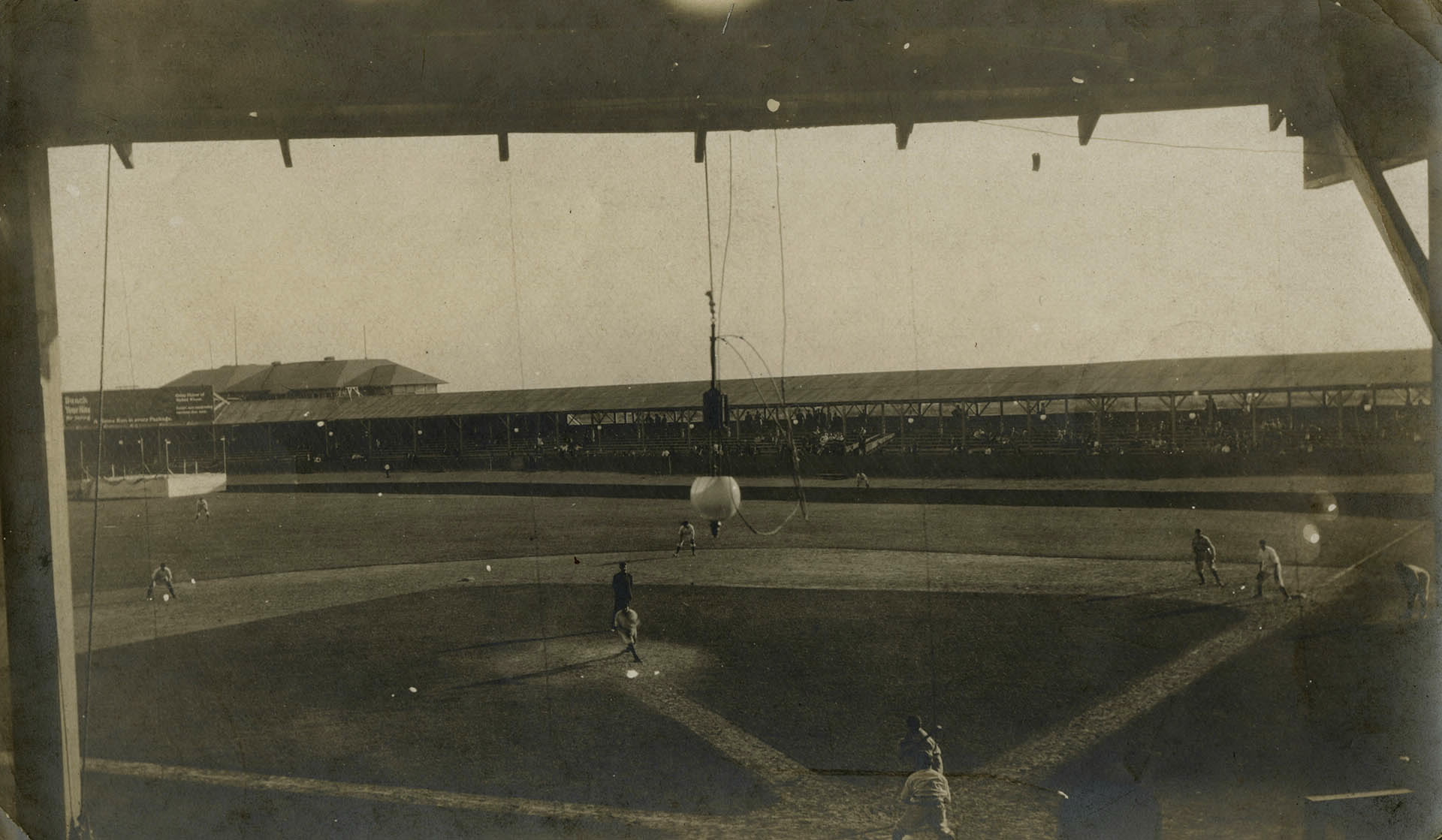
A baseball game being played at the stadium.

In 1908, the stadium was replaced with Maple Leaf Park, a new baseball stand and grounds at Hanlan's Point and the Maple Leafs returned. When it was built, Maple Leaf Park had 3,000 seats, covered bleachers that could accommodate another 4,500, and uncovered bleachers with room for about another 1,800. On opening day, May 12, 1908, the Leafs came from behind to defeat the Jersey City Skeeters in extra innings with paid attendance of 6,192. The stadium was destroyed by a fire on August 10, 1909 which also wiped out the amusement park at Hanlan's Point and Hanlan's Hotel, which was not rebuilt after the fire. For the rest of the season, the Maple Leafs had to return to the smaller Diamond Park.

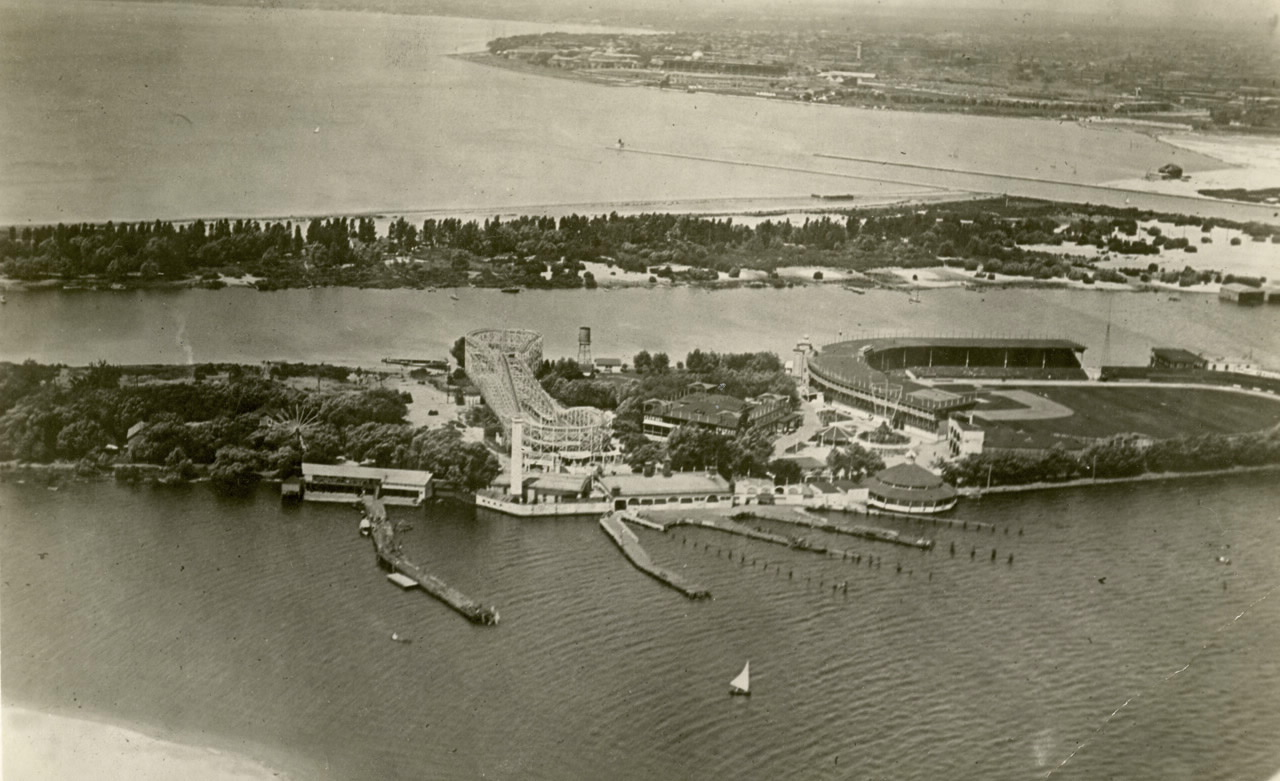
Aerial view looking west of Hanlan's Point and Maple Leaf Park in 1919. The water behind the stadium was filled to create the Toronto Island Airport.

A new stadium was built on the site, opening in 1910 and described at the time as the largest in all of the minor leagues with over 17,000 seats. It was designed by Toronto-based architect Charles F. Wagner. Initial advertising referred to the site as Hanlan's Point Stadium. It was also sometimes called Island Stadium. The first baseball game at the stadium—but not the first event in the building—took place on May 9, 1910 with the Leafs rallying to defeat the Baltimore Orioles in the bottom of the ninth inning in front of a paid crowd of 12,867.

The stadium is notable for being the location of Babe Ruth's first professional home run on September 5, 1914. Ruth was playing for the visiting Providence Grays and pitched a one-hitter against the Leafs to go along with his three-run home run over the right-field wall in a 9-0 win for Providence. A historic plaque commemorates the occasion near the Hanlan's Point dock.

The Maple Leafs left the Toronto Islands for Maple Leaf Stadium after the 1925 season. In March 1927, the parks commissioner of the City of Toronto requested tenders for the demolition of the bleachers. The city architect had deemed them to be unsafe. The field remained in use until the construction of the Toronto Island Airport in 1937, when the area surrounding the airfield (where the old terminal building is now located) was converted to parkland. Two markers were placed near the site along Lakeshore Avenue.
