= Newark Indians =

The Newark Sailors, later known as the Newark Indians, were a minor league baseball team in the early twentieth century. The team played its games at Wiedenmayer's Park in Newark, New Jersey. Newark played in the Eastern League between 1908 and 1911, and they played in the International League from 1912 to 1916.

The team featured strong pitching. In 1908, Tom Hughes led the Eastern League in strikeouts. In 1909, Joe McGinnity led in wins (29), games (55) and strikeouts (195) while allowing just 297 hits in 422 innings. In 1910, McGinnity won 30 games and Rube Waddell finished with a 5–3 record. McGinnity continued as player-manager for two more years.

The team won the International League pennant in 1913, but the following year they slipped to fifth. In 1915, the Indians suddenly had competition: the Indianapolis Hoosiers of the Federal League moved to town, renamed the Newark Peppers. The Indians could not compete with the major-league Peppers, and moved to Harrisburg, Pennsylvania on July 2, 1915.

The following season, the Federal League was no longer operational and the Indians returned to Newark, even playing in the Peppers' old (but still brand-new) ballpark, Harrison Park. But the Indians finished last in 1916 and were replaced by the Newark Bears in 1917. (The Bears would continue playing in the old FL stadium until it burned down in 1924.)

== Year-by-year record ==
Year	Record	Finish	Manager	Playoffs	
1908	79-58	3rd	George Stallings	none	
1909	86-67	2nd	Harry Wolverton / Joe McGinnity	none	
1910	88-66	2nd	Joe McGinnity	none	
1911	57-95	7th	Joe McGinnity	none	
1912	80-72	3rd	Joe McGinnity	none	
1913	95-57	1st	Harry Smith	none League Champs	
1914	73-77	5th	Harry Smith	none	
1915	26-26 (61-76 overall)	--	Harry Smith	none	Team moved to Harrisburg July 2
1916	52-87	8th	Fred Tenney	none	
