= Providence Grays (minor league) =

Former minor league baseball team

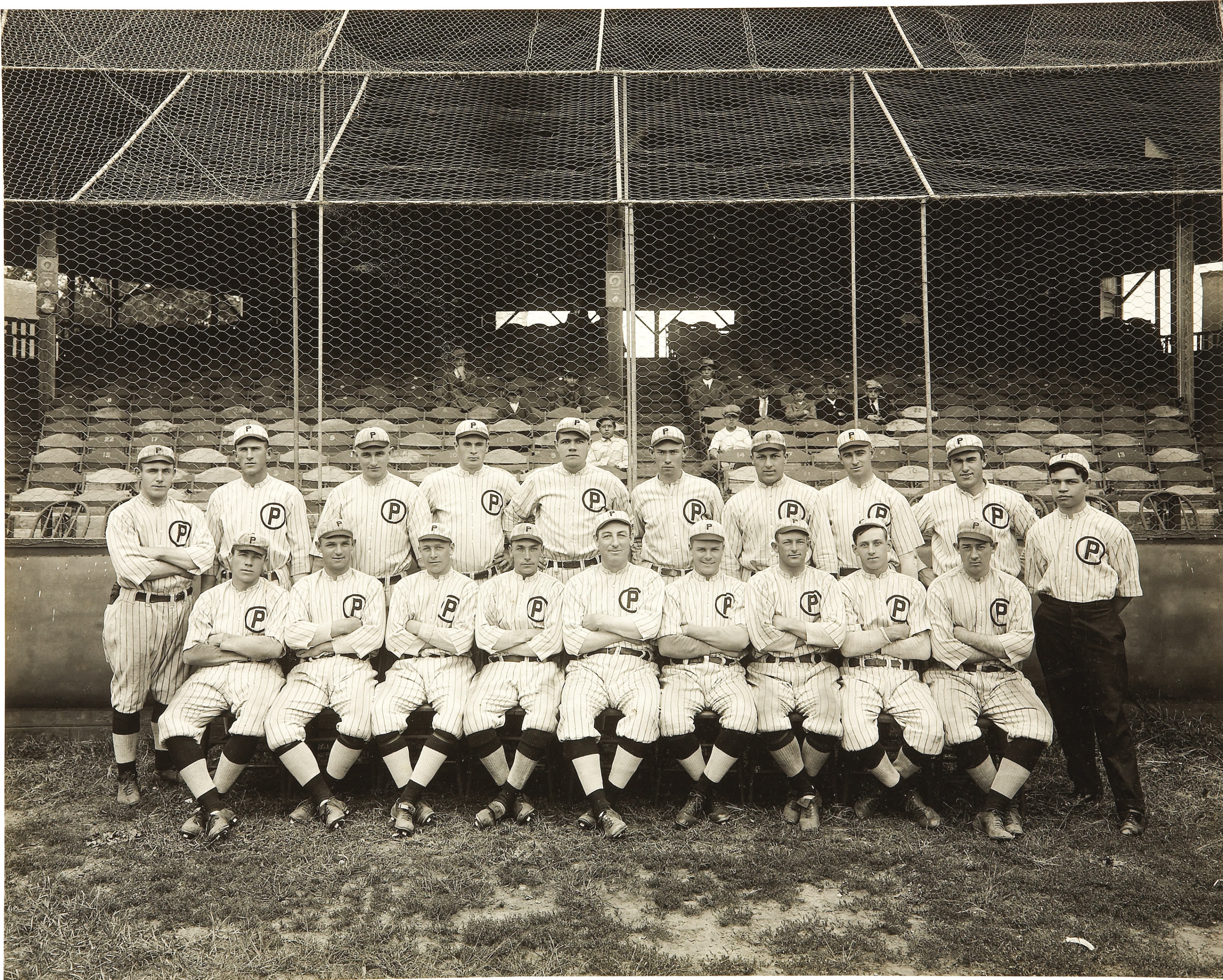
1914 Providence Grays with Babe Ruth

The minor league Providence Grays was the name of several minor league baseball teams between 1886 and 1949. These teams were unconnected to the Major League Baseball Providence Grays.

The first minor league Grays were members of the Eastern League in 1886, playing at the Messer Street Grounds. The team folded in June.

A team known as the Providence Clamdiggers first played in the Eastern Association in 1891, folding in August, and teams known as the Clamdiggers or Grays played in the Eastern League through 1901. The Grays and Clamdiggers had been preceded in Providence by the Providence Rhode Islanders who played as members of the 1877 New England Association.

The next Providence team was a bit more successful, joining the EL in 1899 as the Clamdiggers, then changing its name to the Grays soon thereafter. That team remained in operation through 1919, at which point the EL had become the International League. The team moved back to the new Eastern League in 1918. Babe Ruth, who was still a pitcher at that time, played for this version of the Grays in a few games beginning in August 1914. The Grays had a very successful season in 1914, becoming International League champions.

The Grays returned to the Eastern League again in 1926 as the Providence Rubes before changing its name back to Grays in 1927. This team lasted until 1930. Finally, in 1946, the Providence Chiefs were formed as members of the New England League, who also changed their name to the Grays in 1948 before folding after the 1949 season.
