= New York State League (1885–1917) =

Defunct American baseball league

- Classification: Independent (1885, 1889–1890, 1894–1895, 1899–1901); Class B (1902–1917)
- Sport: Minor League Baseball
- First season: 1885; 141 years ago
- Folded: 1917; 109 years ago
- President: W.S. Arnold (1885); Julius Haas (1894); Dr. Ball (1895); John H. Farrell (1897–1917)
- No. of teams: 33
- Country: United States of America
- Most titles: 4 Wilkes-Barre Barons
- Related competitions: New York-Penn League

The New York State League was a minor league baseball league that played between 1885 and 1917. The league began play as an Independent level league before playing from 1902 to 1917 as a Class B level league. League franchises were based in New York and Pennsylvania. John H. Farrell served as president of the league from 1897 to 1917.

== History ==
The first New York State League in 1885, was actually the second of the many names the International League used before settling on its longterm moniker.

The second New York State League was a six team league for one season in 1889. Oneida was expelled from the league on July 12, and Seneca Falls disbanded August 19.

The third and longest running New York State League was a solid league that lasted from 1899 through 1917. The league was classified as a Class B league in 1902 when the National Association of Professional Baseball Leagues was formed. The loop, which also had teams in Pennsylvania, was also remarkably stable in terms of membership for any minor league of that era. Binghamton and Utica lasted the whole 19-year run.

Baseball Hall of Fame members Grover Cleveland Alexander (1910 Syracuse Stars), Johnny Evers (1902 Troy Trojans) and Bucky Harris (1917 Reading Pretzels) played in the league.

== Cities represented ==
- Albany, NY: Albany Senators 1885, 1890, 1894–1895, 1899–1916
- Amsterdam, NY: Amsterdam Carpet Tacks 1894; Amsterdam Red Stockings 1895
- Amsterdam, NY / Johnstown, NY / Gloversville, NY: Amsterdam-Gloversville-Johnstown Jags 1902; Amsterdam–Gloversville–Johnstown Hypens 1903–1904; Amsterdam-Gloversville-Johnstown Jags 1905–1908
- Auburn, NY: Auburn 1889; Auburn Maroons 1897–1898; Auburn Pioneers 1899
- Binghamton, NY: Binghamton Bingoes 1885; Binghamton Crickets 1895; Binghamton Bingos 1899; Binghamton Crickets 1900; Binghamton Bingoes 1901–1917
- Canandaigua, NY: Canandaigua 1889;
- Cobleskill, NY: Cobleskill Giants 1890;
- Cortland, NY: Cortland Wagonmakers 1899–1901
- Elmira, NY: Elmira Colonels 1885; Elmira 1889; Elmira Pioneers 1895, 1900; Elmira Rams 1908, Elmira Pioneers 1908–1917
- Gloversville, NY: Gloversville Glovers 1895
- Harrisburg, PA: Harrisburg Islanders 1916–1917
- Ilion, NY: Ilion Typewriters 1901–1904
- Johnstown, NY: Johnstown Buckskins 1894–1895
- Johnstown, NY & Gloversville, NY: Johnstown-Gloversville 1890;
- Kingston, NY: Kingston Patriarchs 1894
- Oneida, NY: Oneida 1889;
- Oneonta, NY: Oneonta 1890;
- Oswego, NY: Oswego Sweegs 1885; Oswego Oswegos 1899; Oswego Grays 1900
- Palmyra, NY: Palmyra Mormans 1897–1898
- Pittsfield, MA: Pittsfield Colts 1894
- Poughkeepsie, NY: Poughkeepsie Bridge Citys 1894
- Reading, PA: Reading Pretzels 1916–1917
- Rochester, NY: Rochester Flour Cities 1885;
- Rome, NY: Rome Romans 1899–1901
- Schenectady, NY: Schenectady Dorpians 1895; Schenectady Electricians 1899–1902; Schenectady Frog Alleys 1903; Schenectady Electricians 1904
- Scranton, PA: Scranton Miners 1904–1917
- Seneca Falls, NY: Seneca Falls Maroons 1889;
- Syracuse, NY: Syracuse Stars 1885; 1902–1917
- Troy, NY: Troy (NY) Trojans 1890, 1895; Troy Washerwomen 1899–1900; Troy (NY) Trojans 1901–1916
- Utica, NY: Utica Pentups 1885; Utica 1889; Utica Pent-Ups 1890; 1899–1909; Utica Utes 1910–1917
- Waverly, NY: Waverly Wagonmakers 1901
- Wilkes-Barre, PA: Wilkes-Barre Barons 1905–1917

== Standings and statistics ==
=== 1885 to 1904 ===
1885 New York State League

Team standings	W	L	PCT	GB	Managers
Syracuse Stars	52	37	.584	–	Henry Ormsbee / John Humphries
Utica Pentups	49	41	.544	3½	Dave Dischler
Rochester Flour Cities	45	42	.517	6	James Jackson / Harry Leonard
Binghamton Bingoes	41	46	.471	10	Leonard Baldwin
Oswego Sweegs	35	51	.407	15½	Jack Gorman / Salladin; Michael Gill
Albany Senators	24	20	.545	NA	Billy Arnold
Elmira Colonels	0	9	.000	NA	Wightman / Doc Kennedy

Elmira entered the league July 10 and disbanded July 26; Albany disbanded July 27.

Player statistics
Player	Team	Stat	Tot	Player	Team	Stat	Tot
Doc Kennedy	Elmira	BA	.387	Jim Devine	Syracuse	ERA	0.76
Sandy Griffin	Utica	Hits	91				
Charlie Osterhout	Toronto	Runs	74				

1889 New York State League

Team standings	W	L	PCT	GB	Managers
Auburn	32	19	.627	–	Frank Leonard
Elmira	30	21	.588	2	Harry Taylor
Canandaigua	27	24	.529	5	E.P. Gardner
Utica Pentups	22	28	.440	9½	George Geer
Seneca Falls Maroons	18	28	.391	11½	John Esmack / William Urquhart; John O' Toole
Oneida	8	17	.320	NA	Juice Latham

Oneida expelled July 12; Seneca Falls folded August 19.

Player statistics
Player	Team	Stat	Tot
Harry Taylor	Elmira	BA	.377
Dan Phalen	Auburn	Hits	92
T.L. Keay	Auburn	Runs	70
Tim Shinnick	Auburn	SB	44

1890 New York State League

Team standings	W	L	PCT	GB	Managers
Troy Trojans	52	37	.584	–	Jack Remsen
Cobleskill Giants	42	38	.525	5½	Myron Allen
Utica Pent-Ups	46	44	.511	6½	David Dischler
Johnstown–Gloversville	46	46	.500	7½	John Case
Oneonta	36	42	.462	10½	W.P. Bowling /Conkley; George Geer
Albany Senators	39	54	.419	15	Tom York / William Primrose

Oneonta folded September 3; Cobleskill folded September 20

Player statistics
Player	Team	Stat	Tot	Player	Team	Stat	Tot
Doc Kennedy	Utica	BA	.369	Tom Brahan	Troy	W	20
John Gunshannon	Troy	Runs	96	James McGuire	Utica	W	20
Bill Dahlen	Cobleskill	Hits	137	Patrick Shea	Johnstown–Gloversville	SO	170
Andy Costello	Johnstown–Gloversville	HR	6	Patrick Shea	Johnstown–Gloversville	ERA	0.79
Thomas Meara	Oneonta/Utica	SB	84	Tom Brahan	Troy	PCT	.741 20–7

1894 New York State League

Team standings	W	L	PCT	GB	Managers
Amsterdam Carpet Tacks	30	21	.588	–	Walter Beebe / John Bartholomew; Bart Howard
Poughkeepsie Bridge Citys	25	21	.543	2½	John Darrow
Johnstown Buckskins	22	20	.524	3½	George Geer
Kingston Patriarchs	13	31	.295	13½	Richard Johnston / George Madden
Albany Senators	19	12	.613	NA	Billy Arnold
Pittsfield Colts	13	17	.433	NA	George Roberts / Edward Cain

Albany and Pittsfield disbanded July 3

Player statistics
Player	Team	Stat	Tot
Chauncey Baldwin	Amsterdam	W	11
Chauncey Baldwin	Amsterdam	PCT	.786 11–3

1895 New York State League

Team standings	W	L	PCT	GB	Managers
Binghamton Crickets	28	21	.571	–	Victor Wilber
Amsterdam Red Stockings	29	22	.569	-	Tom Donovan
Elmira Pioneers	29	23	.558	½	William Heine
Schenectady Dorpians	24	24	.500	3½	Irvin Cook / Patrick Shea
Gloversville Glovers	20	27	.426	NA	George Geer
Johnstown Buckskins	17	28	.378	NA	Ed Breckinridge
Troy Trojans	7	7	.500	NA	J.D. Maloney
Albany Senators	6	8	.429	NA	Henry Ramsey

Albany and Troy folded May 20; Gloversville and Johnstown folded July 4

Player statistics
Player	Team	Stat	Tot	Player	Team	Stat	Tot
Si Lauer	Amsterdam	HR	7	Tom Braham	Elmira	W	11
Hollis	Elmira	W	11				
Ed Murphy	Binghamton	W	11				
Ed Murphy	Binghamton	PCT	.688 11–5				

1897 New York State League

Team standings	W	L	PCT	GB	Managers
Canandaigua Rustlers	53	35	.602	–	Henry Ramsey
Palmyra Mormons	51	35	.593	1	Charles Faatz
Auburn Maroons	50	41	.549	4½	Tim Shinnick
Cortland Hirelings	29	36	.446	NA	George Geer / Otis Smith
Batavia Giants / Geneva Alhambras	25	60	.294	26.5	Martin Earley / Joe Hornung / L. Angevine / William McNamara / Ralph Fray

Cortland joined June 2; Batavia (11–33) moved to Geneva July 25

Player statistics
Player	Team	Stat	Tot	Player	Team	Stat	Tot
Bill Duggleby	Auburn	BA	.365	Bill Duggleby	Auburn	ERA	1.31
James Toman	Auburn	R	102				
Chris Genegel	Canandaigua	Hits	131				
Tom Twaddle	Auburn	Hits	131				

1898 New York State League

Team standings	W	L	PCT	GB	Managers
Canandaigua Rustlers	55	41	.579	–	Henry Ramsey
Oswego Grays	52	47	.525	4	James Sayer
Auburn Maroons	52	50	.510	5½	Tim Shinnick / Barney McManus; Michael J. Finn
Utica Pent-Ups	49	49	.500	6½	Jack Cronin / George Geer; Brown / George Blackburn; Howard Earl
Cortland Wagonmakers	45	49	.479	8½	Tom McGuirk / Ed Delaney; Frank Leonard
Rome (NY) Romans	43	51	.457	10½	Charles Faatz / Hobart Whiting
Lyons	40	37	.519	NA	Louis Bacon
Palmyra Mormons / Johnstown	29	39	.426	NA	Doc Kennedy / Wimple; Daniel Ryan / Michael J. Finn; Charles Faatz

Palmyra (25–35) disbanded July 22, franchise to Johnstown (4–4) Aug 6, Johnstown disbanded August 16; Lyons disbanded August 12

Player statistics
Player	Team	Stat	Tot	Player	Team	Stat	Tot
Peter Eagan	Utica	BA	.365	Tom Johnson	Utica	W	20
Tommy Leach	Auburn	Runs	85	Bill Setley	Utica/Canandaigua	PCT	.733 11–4
Jimmy Barrett	Oswego	Hits	132				
Jimmy Barrett	Oswego	HR	5				
Tommy Leach	Auburn	HR	5				

1899 New York State League

Team standings	W	L	PCT	GB	Managers
Rome Romans	76	32	.705	–	Tom O'Brien
Utica Pent-Ups	70	43	.620	8½	Howard Earl
Cortland Wagonmakers	56	46	.550	17	Henry Ramsey
Binghamton Bingoes	56	55	.505	21½	Louis Bacon
Oswego Grays	57	57	.500	22	James Sayers
Albany Senators	54	62	.466	26	Charles Faatz / Julius Haas / John Rafter
Auburn Prisoners / Troy Washerwomen	43	69	.384	35	Tim Shinnick / Charles Faatz
Schenectady Electricians	29	77	.274	46	James Brady / Lew Whistler /Hodge Berry; Harry Raymond / Billy Bottenus

Auburn (27–43) moved to Troy August 1.

Player statistics
Player	Team	Stat	Tot	Player	Team	Stat	Tot
Eddie Hill	Binghamton	BA	.378	Frank Rudderham	Rome	W	26
Bill Fox	Rome	Runs	113	George Wheeler	Rome	Pct	.765; 13–4
Eddie Hill	Binghamton	Hits	158				
Bill Gilbert	Utica	SB	78				

1900 New York State League

Team standings	W	L	PCT	GB	Managers
Utica Pent-Ups	74	43	.633	–	Howard Earl
Cortland Wagonmakers	70	43	.621	2	J.D. Roche
Rome Romans	70	44	.617	2½	Tom O'Brien
Schenectady Electricians	55	61	.474	18½	Lew Whistler
Albany Senators	54	62	.466	19½	Bill Smith
Binghamton Crickets	43	54	.443	21	Louis Bacon / H.M. Gitchell
Troy Washerwomen	48	66	.421	24½	Henry Ramsey / Charles Van Anin
Oswego Grays / Elmira Pioneers	31	72	.300	36	Tim Shinnick / Walt Preston; Abner Powell

Oswego (20–45) moved to Elmira July 30.

Player statistics
Player	Team	Stat	Tot	Player	Team	Stat	Tot
John Dobbs	Utica	BA	.366	Willard Mains	Rome	W	27
John Dobbs	Utica	Runs	113	Willard Mains	Rome	Pct	.844; 27–5
John Dobbs	Utica	Hits	171				
Lew Whistler	Schenectady	HR	9				
Bill Fox	Rome	SB	63				

1901 New York State League

Team standings	W	L	PCT	GB	Managers
Albany Senators	72	43	.626	–	Tom O'Brien
Utica Pent-Ups	68	44	.607	2½	Wally Taylor
Binghamton Bingoes	69	45	.605	2½	Count Campau
Rome Romans	62	47	.569	7	George Wheeler
Schenectady Electricians	65	60	.565	7	Howard Earl
Troy Trojans	46	62	.426	22½	Louis Bacon
Cortland / Waverly Wagonmakers	36	68	.346	30½	William A. Smith
Ilion Typewriters	23	82	.219	44	Tim Shinnick

Cortland (22–34) moved to Waverly July 11.

Player statistics
Player	Team	Stat	Tot	Player	Team	Stat	Tot
Hugh Ahern	Troy	BA	.380	George Merritt	Utica	W	23
Chick Cargo	Albany	Runs	110	George Merritt	Utica	Pct	.741; 23–8
Jim Jones	Albany	Hits	154				
Jim Tamsett	Albany	SB	56				

1902 New York State League

Team standings	W	L	PCT	GB	Managers
Albany Senators	73	42	.635	–	Tom O'Brien
Binghamton Bingoes	71	41	.634	½	Count Campau
Ilion Typewriters	59	47	.557	9½	Howard Earl
Syracuse Stars	61	55	.526	12½	Sandy Griffin
Schenectady Electricians	56	55	.505	15	Lew Whistler
Utica Pent-Ups	49	63	.438	22½	Wally Taylor
Troy Trojans	40	63	.388	27	Louis Bacon
Amsterdam-Johnstown-Gloversville Jags	29	72	.287	37	Tommy Dowd

Player statistics
Player	Team	Stat	Tot	Player	Team	Stat	Tot
Curt Bernard	Albany	BA	.323	Ernie Crabill	Binghamton	W	22
Chick Cargo	Albany	Runs	94	Ernie Crabill	Binghamton	Pct	.759; 22–7
Arthur Ross	Syracuse	Runs	94				
Curt Bernard	Albany	Hits	148				
Johnny Evers	Troy	HR	10				

1903 New York State League

Team standings	W	L	PCT	GB	Managers
Schenectady Frog Alleys	80	52	.606	–	Ben Ellis
Syracuse Stars	80	54	.597	1	Sandy Griffin
Troy Trojans	72	47	.605	1½	Louis Bacon
Albany Senators	63	60	.512	12½	Mike Doherty
Utica Pent-Ups	61	63	.492	15	James Sayer / Elmer Horton
Binghamton Bingoes	52	72	.419	24	John Quinn / Fred Popkay; Count Campau
Ilion Typewriters	52	73	.416	24½	Howard Earl
Amsterdam-Johnstown-Gloversville Hyphens	43	82	.350	33½	Doc Hazleton / Dan Shannon; Clarence Williams

Player statistics
Player	Team	Stat	Tot	Player	Team	Stat	Tot
Charlie Loudenslager	Syracuse	BA	.326	Jack Fifield	Syracuse	W	26
Archie Marshall	Troy	Runs	90	Red Ames	Ilion	SO	214
Charlie Loudenslager	Syracuse	Hits	167	Del Mason	Schenectady	Pct	.774: 24–7
Archie Marshall	Troy	HR	8				

1904 New York State League

Team standings	W	L	PCT	GB	Managers
Syracuse Stars	91	44	.674	–	Sandy Griffin
Albany Senators	81	52	.609	9	Mike Doherty
Ilion Typewriters	75	56	.573	14	Jack Sharrott
Amsterdam-Johnstown-Gloversville Hyphens	65	61	.516	21½	Howard Earl
Troy Trojans	61	73	.455	29½	Louis Bacon
Utica Pent-Ups	59	73	.447	30½	Elmer Horton / John Lawler
Schenectady Electricians / Scranton Miners	47	75	.385	35½	Ben Ellis / Lou O'Neal; Tom Bannon
Binghamton Bingoes	40	85	.320	46	Count Campau

Schenectady (20–39) moved to Scranton July 17.

Player statistics
Player	Team	Stat	Tot	Player	Team	Stat	Tot
Elmer Smith	Ilion	BA	.326	Jack Fifield	Syracuse	W	26
Pat Crisham	Syracuse	Runs	89	Jack Fifield	Syracuse	Pct	.788; 26–7
Frank Schulte	Syracuse	Hits	159				
Jack Fox	Utica	Hits	159				

=== 1905 to 1910 ===
1905 New York State League

Team standings	W	L	PCT	GB	Managers
Amsterdam-Johnstown-Gloversville Jags	71	51	.582	–	Howard Earl
Syracuse Stars	70	51	.579	½	Sandy Griffin
Wilkes-Barre Barons	70	52	.574	1	Jack Sharrott
Albany Senators	69	60	.535	5½	James Connors / Mike Doherty
Utica Pent-Ups	60	60	.500	10	John Lawler
Scranton Miners	56	67	.455	15½	Jim Garry / Edward Ashenbach
Binghamton Bingoes	48	75	.390	23½	Count Campau / Bob Drury
Troy Trojans	51	79	.392	24	Louis Bacon / Harry Mason; Collins

Player statistics
Player	Team	Stat	Tot	Player	Team	Stat	Tot
John Seigle	Wilkes–Barre	BA	.344	George Bell	Amsterdam–Johnstown–Gloversville	W	25
Rube DeGroff	Troy	Runs	85	George Bell	Amsterdam–Johnstown–Gloversville	Pct	.676; 25-12
John Seigle	Wilkes–Barre	Hits	159				

1906 New York State League

Team standings	W	L	PCT	GB	Managers
Scranton Miners	82	48	.531	–	Edward Ashenbach
Albany Senators	73	63	.537	12	Michael Doherty
Syracuse Stars	70	65	.519	14½	Sandy Griffin
Troy Trojans	67	64	.511	15½	John O'Brien
Amsterdam-Johnstown-Gloversville Jags	66	68	.493	17½	Howard Earl
Utica Pent-Ups	61	72	.459	22	John Lawler
Binghamton Bingoes	58	72	.446	23½	Robert Drury
Wilkes-Barre Barons	52	76	.406	29	Jack Sharrott / Mike Donovan

Player statistics
Player	Team	Stat	Tot	Player	Team	Stat	Tot
Moonlight Graham	Scranton	BA	.336	Robert Chappelle	Albany	W	27
Rube DeGroff	Troy	Hits	160	Robert Chappelle	Albany	Pct	.794; 27–7
Frank Hafford	Amsterdam–Johnstown–Gloversville	Runs	86				
Joe Raidy	Binghamton	SB	48				

1907 New York State League

Team Standings	W	L	PCT	GB	Managers
Albany Senators	79	50	.612	–	Michael Doherty
Scranton Miners	81	54	.600	1	Henry Ramsey
Utica Pent-Ups	78	54	.591	2½	Charles Dooley
Troy Trojans	75	56	.573	5	John O'Brien
Wilkes-Barre Coal Barons	69	66	.511	13	Abel Lizotte
Syracuse Stars	61	75	.449	21½	Sandy Griffin
Binghamton Bingoes	51	83	.381	30½	Robert Drury
Amsterdam-Johnstown-Gloversville Jags	39	95	.291	42½	Howard Earl

Player statistics
Player	Team	Stat	Tot	Player	Team	Stat	Tot
Gene Goode	Amsterdam–Johnstown–Gloversville	BA	.315	Biff Schlitzer	Utica	W	27
Rube DeGroff	Troy	Hits	151	Biff Schlitzer	Utica	SO	207
Fred Eley	Wilkes-Barre	Runs	76	Biff Schlitzer	Utica	Pct	.711; 27–11
Frank Carroll	Utica	SB	51				

1908 New York State League

Team standings	W	L	PCT	GB	Managers
Scranton Miners	84	51	.622	–	Mal Kittridge
Binghamton Bingoes	80	61	.567	7	Jimmy Bannon
Troy Trojans	78	61	.561	9	John O'Brien
Syracuse Stars	76	64	.543	10½	Sandy Griffin
Utica Pent-Ups	74	64	.536	11½	Charles Dooley
Albany Senators	67	73	.479	19½	Michael Doherty
Wilkes-Barre Barons	60	77	.438	25	Abel Lizotte / Robert Drury
Amsterdam–Johnstown–Gloversville/ Gloversville-Johnstown Jags / Elmira Rams	36	104	.257	50½	Louis Bacon / Henry Ramsey

Amsterdam–Gloversville–Johnstown (1–8) became "Johnstown-Gloversville" (11–54) May 18, then moved to Elmira (24–42) July 22.

Player Statistics
Player	Team	Stat	Tot
Gene Goode	Troy	BA	.305
Gene Goode	Troy	Hits	153
Jim Tamsett	Albany	Runs	88
Art Marcan	Troy	SB	65

1909 New York State League

Team standings	W	L	PCT	GB	Managers
Wilkes-Barre Barons	88	53	.624	–	Mal Kittridge
Utica Pent-Ups	84	56	.600	3½	Charles Dooley
Albany Senators	76	63	.547	11	William Clark
Elmira Pioneers	68	68	.500	17½	Henry Ramsey / Jerry Hurley
Binghamton Bingoes	61	77	.442	25½	William Roach
Troy Trojans	60	76	.441	25½	Ed Murphy
Syracuse Stars	60	78	.435	26½	Sandy Griffin
Scranton Miners	55	81	.404	30½	August Zeimer

Player statistics
Player	Team	Stat	Tot
Bill Kay	Albany	BA	.351
Bill Kay	Albany	Hits	185
Delos Drake	Wilkes-Barre	Hits	185
Tommy Madden	Utica	Runs	103
Tommy Madden	Utica	SB	57

1910 New York State League

Team standings	W	L	PCT	GB	Managers
Wilkes-Barre Barons	85	53	.616	–	Bill Clymer
Syracuse Stars	78	57	.577	5½	Edward Ashenbach
Elmira Colonels	76	57	.571	7½	Mike O'Neill
Scranton Miners	72	66	.529	13	Monte Cross
Albany Senators	70	65	.519	13½	William Clark
Utica Utes	69	69	.500	16	Charles Dooley
Troy Trojans	48	85	.361	34½	Jim Kennedy
Binghamton Bingoes	44	90	.328	39	John Warner / James Mooney; Harry Lumley

Player statistics
Player	Team	Stat	Tot	Player	Team	Stat	Tot
Bill Kay	Albany	BA	.363	George Chalmers	Scranton	W	25
Bill Zimmerman	Utica	Runs	98	George Chalmers	Scranton	Pct	.806; 25–6
Jay Kirke	Scranton	Hits	182	Grover Cleveland Alexander	Syracuse	ShO	12
Bill Zimmerman	Utica	SB	105				

=== 1911 to 1917 ===
1911 New York State League

Team standings	W	L	PCT	GB	Managers
Wilkes-Barre Barons	82	61	.573	–	Bill Clymer
Elmira Colonels	74	62	.544	4½	Jack Calhoun
Troy Trojans	74	66	.529	6½	Larry Schlafly
Albany Senators	70	70	.500	10½	William Clark / James Tamsett
Utica Utes	67	74	.475	14	Charlie Carr
Syracuse Stars	65	74	.467	15	Ed Ashenbach / Snake Deal
Scranton Miners	63	74	.460	16	Monte Cross
Binghamton Bingoes	63	77	.450	17½	Harry Lumley

Player statistics
Player	Team	Stat	Tot	Player	Team	Stat	Tot
Larry Schlafly	Troy	BA	.344	Prince Gaskill	Scranton	W	20
Mike O'Neill	Utica	Runs	99	Jim McCloskey	Wilkes–Barre	W	20
Chick Hartley	Albany	Hits	173	Jim Swift	Elmira	W	20
				Joe Kutz	Utica/Wilkes	Pct	.625; 10–6

1912 New York State League

Team standings	W	L	PCT	GB	Managers
Utica Utes	82	57	.590	–	Mike O'Neill
Wilkes-Barre Barons	81	57	.587	½	Bill Clymer
Elmira Colonels	75	58	.564	4	Jack Calhoun
Troy Trojans	70	62	.530	8½	Henry Ramsey
Scranton Miners	62	69	.473	16	John Freeman
Albany Senators	62	72	.463	17½	Jim Tamsett
Syracuse Stars	54	82	.397	26½	Ed McCafferty / Fred Burchell
Binghamton Bingoes	50	79	.388	27	Harry Lumley / Hollis Gitchell / Gus Zelmer

Player statistics
Player	Team	Stat	Tot
Harry Lumley	Bing/Troy	BA	.326
Charlie Loudenslager	Syracuse	Hits	166
George Anderson	Wilkes–Barre	Runs	107
George Pierce	Scranton	SOs	238
Harry McChesney	Elmira	HR	12

1913 New York State League

Team standings	W	L	PCT	GB	Managers
Binghamton Bingoes	84	53	.613	–	Jack Calhoun
Wilkes-Barre Barons	84	56	.600	1½	Joe McCarthy
Troy Trojans	76	61	.556	8	Henry Ramsey
Utica Utes	74	65	.532	11	Mike O'Neill
Albany Senators	72	67	.518	13	James Tamsett / Ed McDonough
Syracuse Stars	61	78	.439	24	Fred Burchell / Fred Payne
Elmira Colonels	56	85	.397	30	Lew Ritter / Bill Conroy
Scranton Miners	49	91	.350	36½	Dick Smith / Bob Peterson / John Kelly

Player statistics
Player	Team	Stat	Tot	Player	Team	Stat	Tot
Cad Coles	Elmira	BA	.356	Judge Nagle	Elmira	SO	170
George Anderson	Wilkes–Barre	Runs	92	Bill Upham	Binghamton	Pct	.778; 14–4
John Leary	Utica	Hits	181				

1914 New York State League

Team standings	W	L	PCT	GB	Managers
Elmira Pioneers	90	48	.652	–	Bill Conroy
Wilkes-Barre Barons	79	55	.590	9	Joe McCarthy
Utica Utes	77	55	.584	10	Mike O'Neill
Binghamton Bingoes	78	56	.582	10	Jack Calhoun
Albany Senators	61	73	.453	27	Ed McDonough
Troy Trojans	59	74	.444	28½	Henry Ramsey / James Tamsett
Syracuse Stars	48	79	.378	36½	Fred Payne
Scranton Miners	42	94	.309	47	John Kelly / Bill Coughlin

Player statistics
Player	Team	Stat	Tot	Player	Team	Stat	Tot
Dick Kauffman	Elmira	BA	.329	Lou North	Syracuse	SO	181
Irish Meusel	Elmira	Runs	86				
Irish Meusel	Elmira	Hits	156				
Otis Johnson	Elmira	HR	13				

1915 New York State League

Team standings	W	L	PCT	GB	Managers
Binghamton Bingoes	79	44	.642	–	Jack Calhoun
Utica Utes	73	46	.614	4	Ed McDonough
Elmira Colonels	72	53	.576	8	Bill Conroy
Scranton Miners	68	55	.553	11	Bill Coughlin
Syracuse Stars	60	60	.500	17½	Mike O'Neill
Wilkes-Barre Barons	54	60	.474	20½	Pete Noonan
Troy Trojans	44	76	.359	33½	Lew Wachter
Albany Senators	33	89	.279	45½	Joe O'Rourke

Player statistics
Player	Team	Stat	Tot	Player	Team	Stat	Tot
Bill Kay	Binghamton	BA	.378	Rube Dessau	Elmira	W	21
Bill Kay	Binghamton	Runs	98	Jess Buckles	Troy	SO	158
Bill Kay	Binghamton	Hits	169	Monte Prieste	Syracuse	Pct	.929; 13–1

1916 New York State League

Team standings	W	L	PCT	GB	Managers
Syracuse Stars	81	52	.609	–	Mike O'Neill
Scranton Miners	67	52	.563	7	Bill Coughlin
Binghamton Bingoes	69	61	.530	10½	Jack Calhoun
Wilkes-Barre Barons	62	63	.496	15	Joe McCarthy
Utica Utes	63	68	.481	17	Amby McConnell
Albany Senators / Reading Pretzels	58	70	.453	20½	Hooks Wiltse
Elmira Colonels	59	75	.440	22½	Bill Conroy
Troy Trojans / Harrisburg Islanders	56	74	.431	23½	Lew Wachter / George Cockill / Walter Blair

Troy (8–27) moved to Harrisburg June 20; Albany (51–57) moved to Reading August 21.

Player statistics
Player	Team	Stat	Tot	Player	Team	Stat	Tot
Bill Kay	Binghamton	BA	.360	Howard Ehmke	Syracuse	W	31
Bill Kay	Binghamton	Runs	85	Howard Ehmke	Syracuse	SO	195
Bill Kay	Binghamton	Hits	166	Howard Ehmke	Syracuse	Pct	.816; 31–7

1917 New York State League

Team standings	W	L	PCT	GB	Managers
Wilkes-Barre Barons	81	37	.686	–	Jack Calhoun
Binghamton Bingoes	71	44	.617	8½	Charlie Hartman
Syracuse Stars	64	51	.557	15½	Mike O'Neill
Elmira Colonels	62	54	.534	18	Jim Jackson
Reading Pretzels	51	70	.421	31½	Hooks Wiltse
Scranton Miners	38	84	.311	45	Bill Coughlin / Jerry Connors
Utica Utes	27	24	.529	NA	Amby McConnell
Harrisburg Islanders	11	41	.212	NA	George Cockill

Harrisburg and Utica disbanded July 4.

Player statistics
Player	Team	Stat	Tot	Player	Team	Stat	Tot
Bud Weiser	Wilkes–Barre	BA	.375	John Verbout	Wilkes–Barre	W	26
Wheat Orcutt	Wilkes–Barre	Runs	83	Oscar Tuero	Wilkes–Barre	SO	156
Hooks Warner	Wilkes–Barre	Hits	144	John Verbout	Wilkes–Barre	Pct	.788; 26–7

== Hall of Fame alumni ==
- Grover Cleveland Alexander, 1910 Syracuse Stars
- Johnny Evers, 1902 Troy (NY) Trojans
- Bucky Harris, 1917 Reading Pretzels
