= Schenectady Electricians =

- 1898–1909; (1895, 1898–1904, 1909); Schenectady, New York

Minor league affiliations
- Class: Class B (1895); Class C (1899–1901); Class B (1902–1904); Independent (1909)
- League: New York State League (1898–1904); Eastern Association (1909)

Major league affiliations
- Team: None

Minor league titles
- League titles (1): 1903

Team data
- Name: Schenectady Dorpians (1895); Schenectady Electricians (1899–1902); Schenectady Frog Alleys (1903); Schenectady Electricians (1904, 1909)
- Ballpark: County Fairgrounds (1895, 1899–1900); Island Park (1901–1904, 1909)

The Schenectady Electricians were a minor league baseball team based in Schenectady, New York and Schenectady County, New York. Schenectady teams played as members of the New York State League (1895, 1898–1904) and Eastern Association (1909), winning the 1903 New York State League championship. Schenectady hosted minor league home games at the County Fairgrounds through 1900 before moving home games to Island Park.

During their championship season in 1903, the entire Schenectady team was jailed overnight for violating local Blue laws after playing a home game on a Sunday.

The team nickname corresponds to Schenectady being the headquarters for the Edison Electric Company (today's General Electric) in the era.

In the era of segregated baseball, the Electricians were succeeded in organized baseball by the 1913 and 1914 Schenectady Mohawk Giants of the Negro Leagues and in minor league play by the 1947 Schenectady Blue Jays, who began play in the Can–Am League.

== History ==
=== New York State League 1895 ===
Minor league baseball began in Schenectady, New York in 1895, when the Schenectady "Dorpians" became members of the Independent eight–team New York State League. The Dorpians finished their initial season with a 24–24 record, placing fourth in the New York State League. The Schenectady managers were Irvin Cook and Patrick Shea, as the Dorpians finished 3.5 games behind the first place Binghamton Crickets. The league began the season with eight teams and ended with four teams. The New York State League did not return to play in 1896.

A Dorpian is loosely defined as nickname for an inhabitant of the city of Schenectady.

The Schenectady "Dorpians" nickname was later adopted by a professional basketball team in the city that played from 1915 to 1923.

=== New York State League 1899 to 1904 ===
After a three year hiatus from minor league play, in 1899, the Schenectady "Electricians" were formed and the team rejoined the Class C level New York State League. The Albany Senators, Auburn Prisoners, Binghamton Bingos, Cortland Wagonmakers, Oswego Grays, Rome Romans and Utica Pent-Ups teams joined the Electricians in beginning league play on May 12, 1899. The Schenectady team was formed late in the spring after the other league teams, leaving its roster thin on quality players.

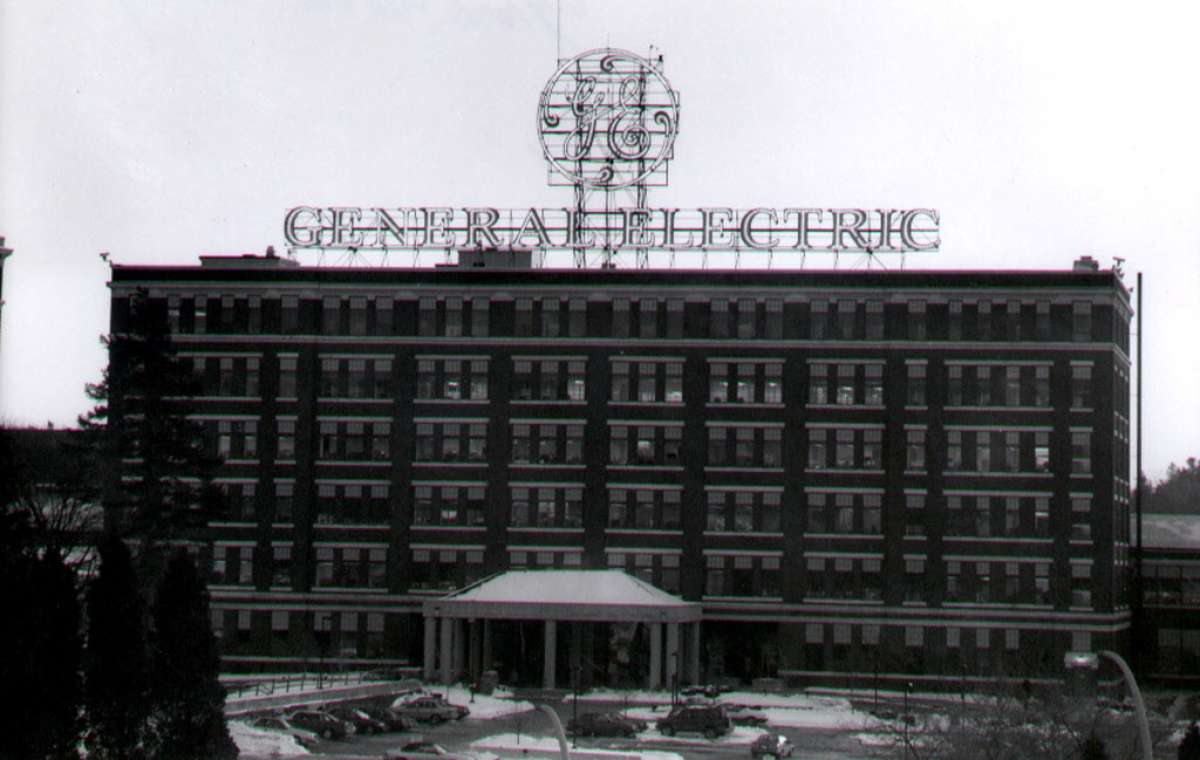
(2021) General Electric Research Laboratory. Schenectady, New York. National Register of Historic Places.

The Schenectady "Electricians" nickname corresponds with local history and industry. The city was once known as "The City that Lights and Hauls the World" in reference to the Edison Electric Company (known today as General Electric), and the American Locomotive Company (ALCO) being headquartered in the Schenectady in the era. Thomas Edison founded the Edison Electric Company in Schenectady in 1886.

In their first season of play, with an inferior roster due to the late formation of the team, the Electricians finished last in the eight-team New York State League. The Electricians finished their first season with a record of 29–77 and played under five managers: James Brady, Hodge Berry, Harry Raymond, Billy Bottenus and Lew Whistler. No playoffs were held as the Rome Romans team ended the season with a record of 76–32, placing first in the New York State League, 46.0 games ahead of the eighth place Electricians.

The team improved in 1900, as the Schenectady Electricians placed fourth, continuing play as members of the eight-team New York State League. The Electricians had a 1900 regular season record of 55–61, playing the season under returning manager Lew Whistler. Schenectady finished 18.5 games behind the first place Utica Pent-Ups in the final standings of the Class C level league. Player/manager Lew Whistler hit 9 home runs to lead the league.

The Electricians placed fifth in the 1901 New York State League final standings. Schenectady ended the season with a record of 65–60, playing the season under manager Howard Earl. The Electricians finished 7.0 games behind the first place Albany Senators in the final standings of the eight-team league.

In 1902, the New York State League was elevated to become a Class B level League. Continuing play in the eight-team league, the Electricians ended the season with a 56–55 record and finished in fifth place. Playing under returning manager Lew Whistler, Schenectady finished 15.0 games behind the first place Albany Senators in the final standings.

The 1903 Schenectady team was nicknamed for the frogs that inhabited their home ballpark at Island Park and the "Frog alley" was a local nickname for the area.

The 1903 Schenectady "Frog Alleys" won the New York State League championship in a season marked by an arrest of the whole team, Schenectady won the league championship by finishing the season with a record of 80–52 record, playing the season under manager Ben Ellis. The Frog Alleys finished just 1.0 game ahead of the second place Syracuse Stars in the final standings of the Class B New York State League. Schenectady pitcher Del Mason led the league pitchers with a 24–7 record.

==== Team arrest ====
On Sunday May 25, 1903, the entire Schenectady team was arrested for allegedly violating local Blue laws after playing a home game at Island Park on a Sunday. The players were arrested by county officials and held in jail. They were tried on the charges of "playing baseball on Sunday." A jury acquitted the players the next day after player/manager Ben Ellis had his case presented first, ending in his acquittal.

Beginning the season as defending league champions, the 1904 Schenectady Electricians relocated during the New York State League season. Despite winning the 1903 championship, the owners had still lost money in the 1903 season and the franchise was relocated after beginning the 1904 season. On July 17, 1904, the Electricians moved to Scranton, Pennsylvania with a record of 20–39, finishing the season playing as the Scranton Miners. After compiling a record of 27–36 while based in Scranton, the team ended the season with an overall record of 47–75. The Schenectady/Scranton team finished in seventh place in the eight-team league, as the returning Ben Ellis and Jim Garry managed the team in the two locations. Schenectady/Scranton finished 35.5 games behind the first place Syracuse Stars in the final New York State League standings.

The Scranton Miners continued New York State League play in 1905, with Jim Garry returning as manager. Schenectady did not return as members of the league.

=== Eastern Association 1909 ===
In 1909, Schenectady became charter members of a new league, which folded after playing less than two weeks. Schenectady folded before the league. The Eastern Association was formed for the 1909 season and played briefly before folding. The league formed as an eight-team league and began play on May 25, 1909, before folding on June 6, 1909. Schenectady and the Poughkeepsie Students teams folded on June 1, 1909. Schenectady and Poughkeepsie had no official win-loss records in the final Eastern Association League standings. Joseph Andries served as the Schenectady manager in the brief season. The Newburgh Colts were in first place in the Eastern Association with an 8–2 record when the league folded.

In the era of segregated baseball, Schenectady next hosted the Schenectady Mohawk Giants of the Negro Leagues, who played in the Eastern Independent Clubs in the 1913 and 1914 seasons. After the 1909 season, Schenectady, New York was without minor league baseball for nearly four decades. The 1947 Schenectady Blue Jays began a tenure of play as members of the Can–Am League.

== The ballparks ==
Early Schenectady teams through 1900 played minor league home games at the County Fairgrounds, also called Driving Park. The fairgrounds were located in the Hamilton Hill neighborhood in Schenectady. Today, the ballpark site is near the Mount Pleasant Fields park and Martin Luther King Elementary School.

Beginning in 1901, Schenectady hosted minor league home games at Island Park. The park was also known as Columbus Park. The park was located on Van Slyck Island on the Mohawk River. The location is no longer an island, having since been connected to the mainland. Today, the ballpark site is on the property of Schenectady County Community College. The ballpark site was near the Western Gateway Bridge and State Street in Schenectady, New York.

Island Park next hosted the Schenectady Mohawk Giants of the Negro Leagues, who played in 1913 and 1914. On October 5, 1913, the Mohawk Giants defeated the major league baseball Washington Senators and Baseball Hall of Fame pitcher Walter Johnson by the score of 1-0 in a game at held at Island Park. There were over 6,000 in attendance for the game.

== Timeline ==
Year(s)	# Yrs.	Team	Level	League	Ballpark
1895	1	Schenectady Dorpians	Class B	New York State League	County Fairgrounds
1899–1900	3	Schenectady Electricians	Class C	New York State League	County Fairgrounds
1901	1	Schenectady Electricians	Class C	New York State League	Island Park
1902	1	Schenectady Electricians	Class B	New York State League	Island Park
1903	1	Schenectady Frog Alleys	Class B	New York State League	Island Park
1904	1	Schenectady Electricians	Class B	New York State League	Island Park
1909	1	Schenectady Electricians	Independent	Eastern Association	Island Park

== Year–by–year records ==
Year	Record	Finish	Manager	Playoffs/notes
1895	24–34	4th	Irvin Cook / Patrick Shea	No playoffs held
1899	29–77	8th	James Brady / Lew Whistler / Hodge Berry / Harry Raymond / Billy Bottenus	No playoffs held
1900	55–61	4th	Lew Whistler	No playoffs held
1901	65–60	5th	Howard Earl	No playoffs held
1902	56–55	5th	Lew Whistler	No playoffs held
1903	80–52	1st	Ben Ellis	League champions No playoffs held
1904	47–75	7th	Ben Ellis / Jim Garry	Team (20–39) moved to Scranton July 17
1905	00–00	NA	Joseph Andries	No known record Team folded June 1 League folded

== Notable alumni ==
- Joe Ardner (1895)
- Larry Battam (1895)
- Cupid Childs (1904)
- Dan Coogan (1902–1903)
- Pete Cregan (1895)
- Bill Cristall (1900)
- John Deering (1899)
- John Dolan (1900)
- Fred Donovan (1901)
- Mike Donovan (1902)
- Bob Drury (1903–1904)
- Howard Earl (1901, MGR)
- Ben Ellis (1901–1902; 1903–1904, MGR)
- Bob Ganley (1902)
- Jim Garry (1903; 1904, MGR)
- Charlie Gettig (1904)
- Art Goodwin (1901, 1903)
- Mike Hickey (1895)
- Jerry Hurley (1901)
- Sandy McDougal (1903–1904)
- Harry McNeal (1899–1900)
- Frank McPartlin (1895)
- Del Mason (1903)
- Tom Messitt (1900)
- Willie Mills (1901)
- Dan Minnehan (1899)
- Mike Mitchell (1902)
- Carlton Molesworth (1900–1901)
- Robert Pender (1899–1900)
- Harry Raymond (1899, MGR)
- Ted Scheffler (1901)
- Johnny Siegle (1900)
- Harry Staley (1899)
- Jack Sutthoff (1900)
- Tom Walker (1900)
- Lew Whistler (1899–1900, 1902, MGR)
- Tom Williams (1895)
- Stan Yerkes (1899)

== See also ==
- Schenectady Electricians players
- Schenectady Dorpians players
- Schenectady Frog Alleys players
