= Cobleskill Giants =

- 1890; Cobleskill (town), New York

Minor league affiliations
- Class: Independent (1890)
- League: New York State League (1890)

Major league affiliations
- Team: None

Minor league titles
- League titles (0): None

Team data
- Name: Cobleskill Giants (1890)
- Ballpark: Cobleskill Fairgrounds* (1890)

The Cobleskill Giants were a minor league baseball team based in Cobleskill, New York. In 1890, the Giants played as members of the New York State League, placing second in the league standings.

== History ==
In 1890, the Cobleskill Giants began play as members of the six–team Independent level New York State League. The Albany Senators, Johnstown-Gloversville, Oneonta, Troy Trojans and Utica Pent-Ups teams joined Cobleskill in beginning league play on Monday, May 12, 1890.

The Cobleskill Giants ended the season with a 42–38 record, placing second, while playing the season under manager Myron Allen. The Giants finished 5.5 games behind the first place Troy Trojans in the final standings. Bill Dahlen led the league with 137 total hits.

The New York State League did not return to play until resuming play in 1894, when the league reformed without a Cobleskill franchise.

Giants manager Myron Allen had played in the major leagues. Players, Bill Dahlen, Alfred Lawson, Michael McDermott, Walter Plock and Marshall Quinton all had major league careers. Lawson also became a noted aviator and founded the Lawson Airplane Company.

The Cobleskill "Independents" town team played in 1905.

Cobleskill has not hosted another minor league team.

== The ballpark ==
The name of the Cobleskill home ballpark is not directly referenced. The Cobleskill Fairgrounds were in use in the era with a grandstand, having been constructed in 1876. The grandstand seated 1,000. Today, the fairgrounds and grandstand are still in use and the site lies within the Cobleskill Historic District.

== Year–by–year record ==
Year	Record	Finish	Manager	Playoffs/Notes
1890	42–38	2nd	Myron Allen	No playoffs held

== Notable alumni ==
- Myron Allen (1890, MGR)
- Bill Dahlen (1890) 1904 NL RBI leader
- Alfred Lawson (1890)
- Michael McDermott (1890)
- Walter Plock (11890)
- Marshall Quinton (1890)

== See also ==
- Cobleskill Giants players
