= Pittsfield Colts =

- 1894; Pittsfield, Massachusetts

Minor league affiliations
- Class: Class B (1894)
- League: New York State League (1894–1895)

Major league affiliations
- Team: None

Minor league titles
- League titles (0): None

Team data
- Name: Pittsfield Colts (1894)
- Ballpark: Wahconah Park

The Pittsfield Colts were a minor league baseball team based in Pittsfield, Massachusetts. In 1894, the Colts briefly played as members of the Class B level New York State League.. The Colts folded during the 1894 season and were succeeded in minor league play by the 1905 Pittsfield Hillies.

The 1894 Pittsfield Colts hosted minor league home games at Wahconah Park, which is still in use today, having been listed on the National Register of Historic Places in 2005.

== History ==
=== 1791 baseball origins ===
Pittsfield has a lengthy baseball history. In 2004, baseball historian John Thorn discovered a reference to a 1791 by-law prohibiting anyone from playing "baseball" within 80 yards (73 m) of a newly built meeting house in Pittsfield. The 1791 document, would be, as of 2004, the earliest known reference to the game in America. (See Origins of baseball.) The document is available on the Pittsfield Library's web site. According to Thorn, the document makes it clear that not only was "baseball" played in 1791 Pittsfield, it was played enough to have a written ordinance against it to protect the new building.

=== 1894: New York State League ===
The Pittsfield "Colts" began minor league baseball play in 1894, as members of the New York State League . The Colts joined the Albany Senators, Amsterdam Carpet Tacks, Johnstown Buckskins, Kingston Patriarchs and Poughkeepsie Bridge Citys in beginning New York State League play on May 12, 1894. In the era, the league was Class B level league, which was the second highest level of minor league classifications.

The Pittsfield Colts of the New York State League ended their 1894 season on July 3, 1894. On that date, with a record of 13–17, Pittsfield folded, along with Albany, leaving the league with four remaining teams. George Roberts and Edward Cain served as the Pittsfield managers during the short season. Pittsfield players Ira Davis, Mike Hickey, Frank McPartlin, John Pappalau and Pussy Tebeau all saw time playing in the major leagues.

The Amsterdam Carpet Tacks eventually won the 1894 New York State League championship, finishing 2.5 games ahead of the second place Poughkeepsie Bridge Citys and 3.5 games ahead of the third place Johnstown Buckskins.

Pittsfield was the only 1894 New York State League team located out of the state of New York, and the club faced financial issues due in part to bad weather causing the cancellation of home games at Wahconah Park.

Minor league play resumed in Pittsfield a decade later, then the Colts were succeeded by the 1905 Pittsfield Hillies, who began a tenure of play as members of the Hudson River League and continued play at Wahconah Park.

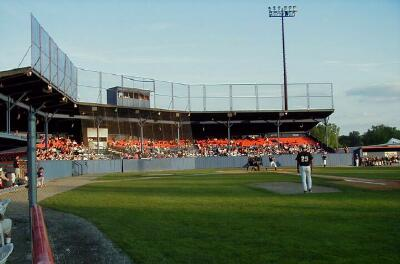
(2006) Wahconah Park. National Register of Historic Places. Pittsfield, Massachusetts

== The ballpark ==
The Pittsfield Colts played 1894 minor league home games at Wahconah Park. The ballpark was built in 1892 and the early park was later reconstructed. The historic ballpark is still in use today. Wahconah Park was listed on the National Register of Historic Places in 2005. The ballpark is located at 143 Wahconah Street in Pittsfield, Massachusetts.

== Year–by–year records ==
Year	Record	Finish	Manager	Playoffs/Notes
1894	13–17	NA	George Roberts / Edward Cain	Team folded July 3

== Notable alumni ==
- Ira Davis (1894)
- Mike Hickey (1894)
- Frank McPartlin (1894)
- John Pappalau (1894)
- Pussy Tebeau (1894)

== See also ==
- Pittsfield Colts players
