= Amby McConnell =

American baseball player (1883–1942)

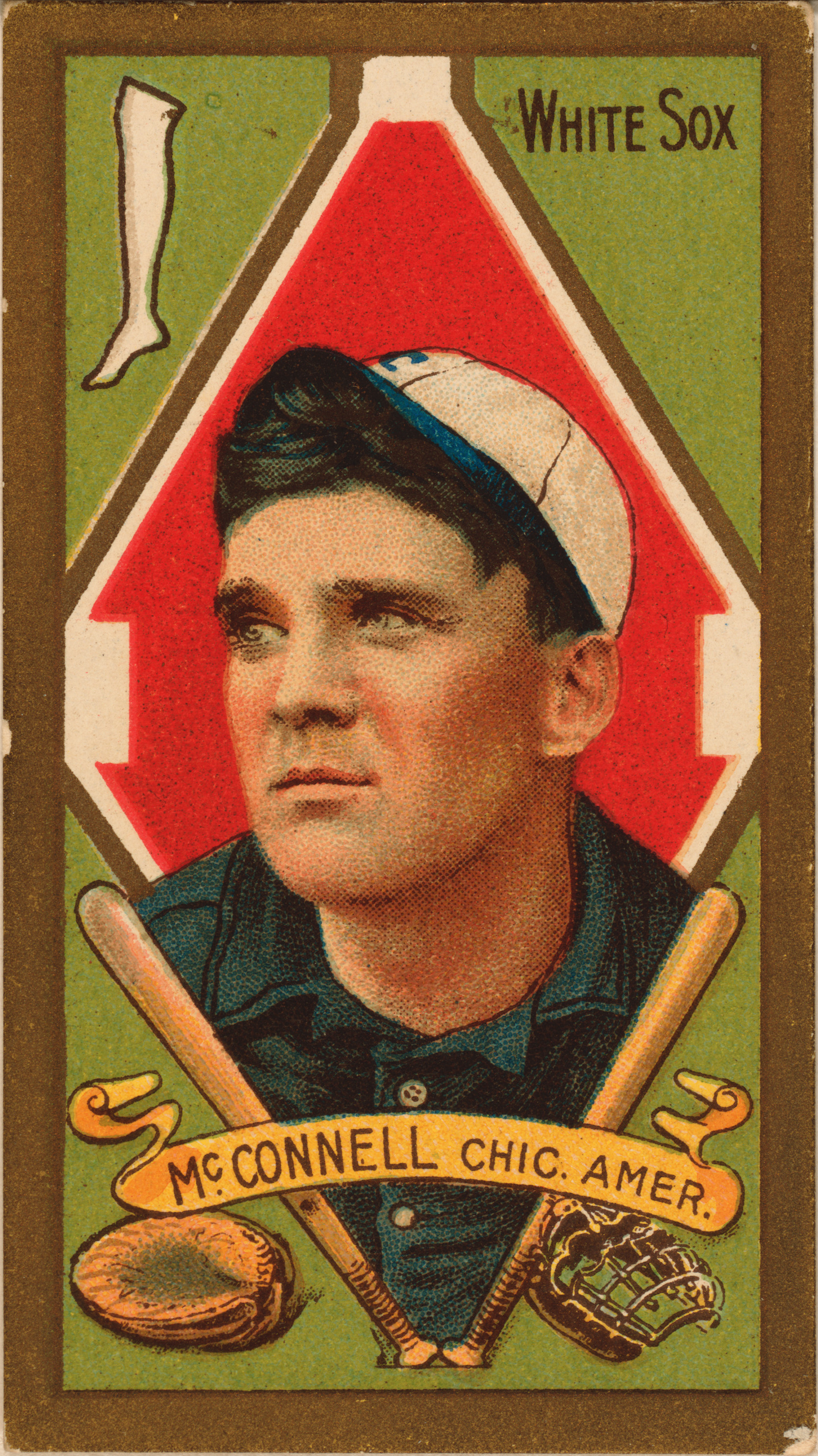
- McConnell's 1911 baseball card
- Second baseman
- Born: April 29, 1883; North Pownal, Vermont, U.S.
- Died: May 20, 1942 (aged 59); Utica, New York, U.S.
- Batted: Left Threw: Right

MLB debut
- April 17, 1908, for the Boston Red Sox

Last MLB appearance
- October 8, 1911, for the Chicago White Sox

MLB statistics
- Batting average: .264
- Home runs: 3
- Runs batted in: 119
- Stats at Baseball Reference

Teams
- Boston Red Sox (1908–1910); Chicago White Sox (1910–1911)

Ambrose Moses McConnell (April 29, 1883 – May 20, 1942) was an American baseball second baseman who played four seasons in Major League Baseball (MLB). Nicknamed "Midget" due to his 5 feet 5 inches (1.65 m) stature, he played for the Boston Red Sox and Chicago White Sox from 1908 to 1911. He batted left-handed but threw right-handed.

McConnell played minor league baseball for three different teams until August 1907, when he signed for the Boston Red Sox. After making his debut the following season and spending three seasons with the Red Sox, McConnell was traded in the middle of the 1910 season to the Chicago White Sox, where he spent the next two years of his career before playing his last game on October 8, 1911. He died on May 20, 1942, in Utica, New York. McConnell is most famous for hitting into the first unassisted triple play in Major League Baseball history on July 19, 1909.

== Personal life ==
McConnell was born on April 29, 1883. He grew up in North Pownal, Vermont, and began his baseball career there. McConnell attended Beloit College and made a living by working at the town mill for fifty hours a week (earning him $6). During his spare time, he would play baseball at a nearby field and soon became well known around the region for his stellar defense. As a result of his newfound fame, a team based in Dalton, Massachusetts, offered McConnell $7.50 a week to play for them. McConnell accepted, even though (unbeknownst to him) some of his new teammates were earning twice as much as he was. After the 1908 season, McConnell got married and eventually had two children.

Throughout his career, McConnell was known to have the odd hobby of collecting pins. When he was in the middle of a batting slump, he would scavenge the streets and pick up any pin he found, believing this was a sign he would break out of the slump.

== Professional career ==
=== Minor leagues ===
McConnell departed the Dalton team in 1902 and began to play organized baseball for semi-pro teams in Rutland, Vermont, and Beloit, Wisconsin, in the following season. In 1904, he joined the Troy Trojans of the New York State League and posted a batting average of .318 in 121 games. Over the next two years, he spent a season each at the Eastern League's Rochester Broncos and the Utica Pent-Ups, where his performance dipped. However, he rebounded in the 1907 season, where he batted .320 and stole 50 bases for the Providence Grays. This prompted the Boston Red Sox to purchase McConnell's contract from the Grays at the end of the season in August. He made his major league debut for the Red Sox on April 17, 1908, at the age of 24, in a 2–1 loss against the Washington Senators.

=== Boston Red Sox (1908–1910) ===
During his 1908 rookie season, McConnell had a relatively successful year. He had the team's second-highest batting average (.279) and number of hits (140). He also set the Red Sox record for most stolen bases in a single-season by a rookie with 31, which stood until being broken by Jacoby Ellsbury on June 15, 2008. Defensively, he committed the most errors among all second basemen in the American League (AL) with 38. This was cited as one of the reasons why the Red Sox were erratic and inconsistent in their performance that season. Nevertheless, McConnell was voted the most popular Red Sox player of the season by the fans, beating out Cy Young and Tris Speaker in the process.

McConnell achieved baseball history when he lined into the first unassisted triple play in Major League Baseball history on July 19, 1909, doing so against the Cleveland Indians at League Park. In the second inning of the game, Heinie Wagner led off with an infield single and outfielder Jake Stahl reached base with a bunt. McConnell unsuccessfully attempted to sacrifice bunt twice and was able to reach a full count before Red Sox manager Fred Lake ordered the two baserunners to hit and run. McConnell then hit a line drive past Cy Young, the game's starting pitcher, and to Indians' shortstop Neal Ball. Ball caught the liner, stepped on second base to retire Wagner, and then tagged Stahl as he was advancing towards second. McConnell finished the 1909 season with a dismal .238 batting average and had the most errors among all AL second basemen for the second consecutive year. Nonetheless, he had 26 stolen bases and was an integral part of the team's offense centered around base-stealing, nicknamed the "Speed Boys".

McConnell began the 1910 season poorly. He batted only .171 in the eleven games he played for the team, before succumbing to an arm injury and appendicitis. He was replaced by Larry Gardner and this change eventually became permanent. As a result, McConnell was deemed redundant and in August, while he was still recovering from injury, he was traded to the Chicago White Sox with Harry Lord in exchange for Billy Purtell and Frank Smith. The trade was controversial at the time and Red Sox fans protested against owner John I. Taylor for carrying out the move.

=== Chicago White Sox (1910–1911) ===
Upon McConnell's arrival in Chicago, White Sox manager Hugh Duffy declared that trading for McConnell and Lord "was just about all that we needed to give the White Sox a team." McConnell performed better after the trade, posting a batting average of .275 during his half-season with the White Sox.
