= Billy Gilbert (baseball) =

American baseball player (1876–1927)

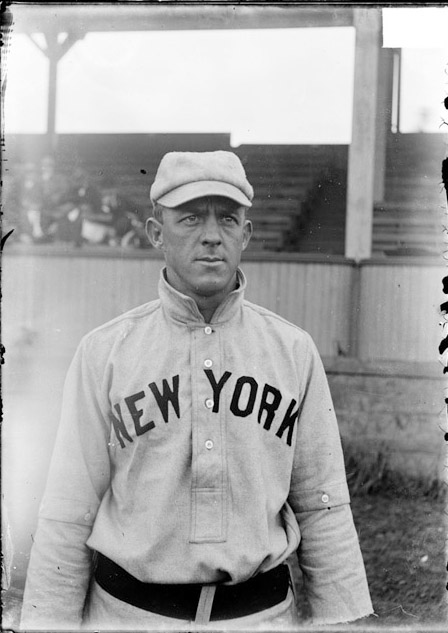
- Gilbert with the Giants in 1905
- Second baseman
- Born: June 21, 1876; Tullytown, Pennsylvania, U.S.
- Died: August 8, 1927 (aged 51); New York, New York, U.S.
- Batted: Right Threw: Right

MLB debut
- April 25, 1901, for the Milwaukee Brewers

Last MLB appearance
- June 27, 1909, for the St. Louis Cardinals

MLB statistics
- Batting average: .247
- Home runs: 4
- Runs batted in: 237
- Stats at Baseball Reference

Teams
- Milwaukee Brewers (1901); Baltimore Orioles (1902); New York Giants (1903–1906); St. Louis Cardinals (1908–1909)

Career highlights and awards
- World Series champion (1905)

William Oliver Gilbert (June 21, 1876 – August 8, 1927) was an American professional baseball second baseman who played from the 1890s through 1912. Gilbert played in Major League Baseball from 1901 to 1909, for the Milwaukee Brewers, Baltimore Orioles, New York Giants, and St. Louis Cardinals.

Standing at just 5 feet 4 inches (1.63 m), Gilbert was a weak hitter but a good defensive second baseman. He hit .313 in the 1905 World Series, which the Giants won.

== Baseball career ==
=== Early career ===
Gilbert made his professional baseball debut in minor league baseball with Lewiston of the Maine State League and the Pawtucket Phenoms and Fall River Indians of the Class-B New England League in 1897. He pitched for the Lyons franchise and the Johnston/Palmyra Mormans in the New York State League in 1898. Now rated a Class-C league, Gilbert returned to the New York State League to play for the Utica Pent-Ups in 1899.

The Milwaukee Brewers of the American League (AL) drafted Gilbert in 1900. They assigned him to the Syracuse Stars of the Class-A Eastern League for the season.

=== Major league career ===
Gilbert made his major league debut with the Brewers in 1901. After the season, Baltimore Orioles player-manager John McGraw bought his contract from the Brewers prior to the 1902 season.

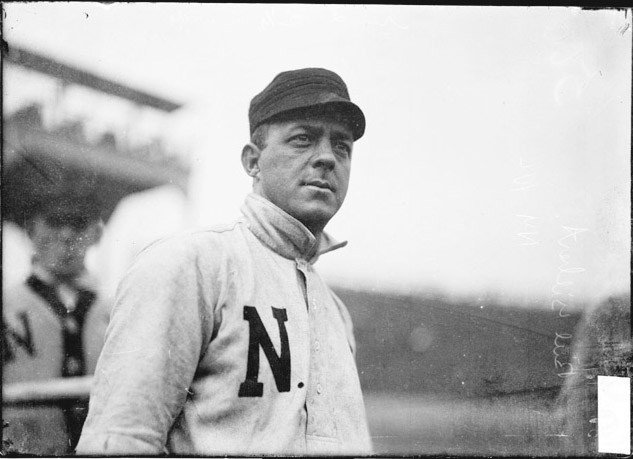
Gilbert at the West Side Grounds in 1905

McGraw jumped to the New York Giants of the National League during the 1902 season. He signed Gilbert to the Giants for the 1903 season and installed him as the team's starting second baseman. Not a highly regarded hitter, Gilbert contributed with his bat as the Giants defeated the Philadelphia Athletics in the 1905 World Series, leading the team in batting average during the series.

He played with the Giants through the 1906 season. Down the stretch in 1906, McGraw replaced Gilbert with Sammy Strang, who produced better offense. After the season, the Giants tried to assign Gilbert to the Newark Indians of the Class-A Eastern League. Not wanting to play in Newark, Gilbert refused to report. Wanting to stay in the NL, Gilbert attempted to negotiate a contract with the Brooklyn Superbas.

Unable to sign with Brooklyn, he contemplated signing with an outlaw team. Instead, Gilbert played for the Trenton Tigers of the Class-B Tri-State League in 1907, and coached the Columbia Lions, the college baseball team of Columbia University.

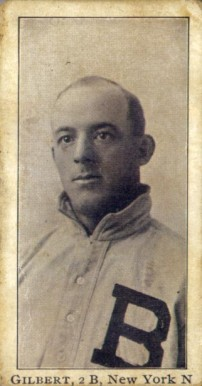
Gilbert's 1902 baseball card

Gilbert returned to the major leagues in 1908 with the St. Louis Cardinals. After the Cardinals fired John McCloskey as their manager after the 1908 season, Gilbert was considered for the job. They instead acquired Roger Bresnahan and made him their player-manager. He made his final major league appearance on June 27, 1909, and served as a Cardinals' scout during the remainder of the season. He was released by Cardinals manager Roger Bresnahan, a former teammate with the Giants, in March 1910.

=== Later career ===
Gilbert played for the Albany Senators of the now Class-B New York State League in 1910. He served as player-manager for the Erie Sailors when they competed in the Class-C Ohio–Pennsylvania League in 1911 and the Class-B Central League in 1912. Gilbert stayed with Erie, competing in the Class-B Interstate League, as manager in 1913. He was fired after the season.

Gilbert spent the next few seasons managing independent teams in New York. Gilbert was hired to manage the Waterbury Brasscos in the Class-A Eastern League in 1921 and 1922, leading them to a second-place finish. He managed the Denver Bears of the Class-A Western League in 1923, and Pittsfield Hillies in the Eastern League in 1924. Gilbert then served as a scout for the Newark Indians of the Class-AA International League.

During his career, Gilbert was highly regarded for his work ethic. He was described as taking after McGraw.

== Later life ==
Gilbert died on August 8, 1927, at his home in New York as a result of apoplexy. He attended a doubleheader in Newark the day before, and was reportedly in good health.
