= Wilkes-Barre (minor league baseball club) =

Wilkes-Barre Barons
- 1886–1955; (1886–1889, 1892–1900, 1902, 1905–1917, 1923–1954); Wilkes-Barre, Pennsylvania

Minor league affiliations
- Previous classes: Class A (1933–1955); Class B (1905–1932); Class D (1902); Class A (1895–1899); Class B (1892)
- League: Eastern League (1938–1955)
- Previous leagues: New York–Pennsylvania League (1923–1937); New York State League (1905–1917); Pennsylvania State League (1902); Atlantic League (1899–1900); Eastern League (1893–1898); Atlantic League (1892); Atlantic Association (1889); Central League (1888); International Association (1887); Pennsylvania State Association (1886–1887)

Major league affiliations
- Previous teams: New York Giants (1955); Chicago White Sox (1954); Cleveland Indians (1939–1951)

Minor league titles
- League titles: 7 (1909, 1910, 1911, 1917, 1930, 1932, 1950)

Team data
- Previous names: Wilkes-Barre Barons (1953–1955); Wilkes-Barre Indians (1948–1951); Wilkes-Barre Barons (1905–1947); Wilkes-Barre/Mount Carmel (1902); Wilkes-Barre Coal Barons (1893–1900); Wilkes-Barre Coal Barons/Pittsburgh (1892); Wilkes-Barre Barons (1888–1889); Wilkes-Barre Coal Barons (1887); Wilkes-Barre (1886)
- Previous parks: Artillery Park (1925-1955)

The Wilkes-Barre Barons were a minor league baseball team that existed off-and-on from 1886 to 1955. They began as an unnamed team in the Pennsylvania State Association in 1886.

The following season the team was known as the Wilkes-Barre Coal Barons and played in the Central League in 1888, but the league disbanded after that season. Two Wilkes-Barre team took the field in 1889 and 1892, with the later sharing representation with Pittsburgh, as Wilkes-Barre Coal Barons/Pittsburgh in the record books. The team then played from 1893 until 1898 in the Eastern League, and from 1898 to 1900 in the Atlantic League.

After spending the 1902 season in the Pennsylvania State League, as Wilkes-Barre/Mount Carmel. Their next incarnation came about in 1905, when they began playing in the New York State League, as the Wilkes-Barre Barons. They played in that league until 1917. From 1923 to 1937, they played in the New York–Pennsylvania League and from 1938 to 1948 they played in the Eastern League. Until 1939, they did not have any affiliations, however from 1939 to 1951 they were affiliated with the Cleveland Indians. The team was briefly named the Wilkes-Barre Indians from 1949 to 1951 and were managed by Bill Norman. They won a league championship in 1950 and made the league playoffs each year they played between 1949 and 1951.

From 1953 to 1955 the team regained the Barons name and once again played in the Eastern League, and in 1954 they were affiliated with the Chicago White Sox. In 1955, they were affiliated with the New York Giants when the franchise moved midseason to become the Johnstown Johnnies.

== The ballpark ==
Wilkes-Barre games were played at Artillery Park from 1925 to 1955.

== Notable alumni ==
Multiple notable players spent time with the team, including:

- Tony Lazzeri (1943, MGR) – inducted into the Baseball Hall of Fame in 1991
- Bob Lemon (1940–1941) – inducted into the Baseball Hall of Fame in 1976
- Joe McCarthy (1912–1914, 1916) – inducted into the Baseball Hall of Fame in 1957
- Ray Boone (1946) 2× MLB All-Star
- Frank Brannan,
- Bob Bruce (1954)
- Leon Cadore (1912)
- Bill Dietrich (1932)
- Hank Edwards (1941)
- Nick Etten (1936) MLB All-Star; 1940 AL Home Run Leader
- Elbie Fletcher (1935) MLB All-Star
- Alex Ferguson (1932)
- Buck Freeman (1893)
- Mike Garcia (1946-1947) 3× MLB All-Star; 1954 AL ERA Title
- Doug Hansen,
- Jim Hegan (1940) 5 x MLB All-Star
- Dave Hoskins (1950-1951)
- Sam Jones (1950) 2× MLB All-Star; 1959 NL ERA Title
- Bob Kuzava (1946)
- Brooks Lawrence (1951) MLB All-Star
- Danny Litwhiler (1953) MLB All-Star
- Don Mossi (1951) MLB All-Star
- Ray Narleski (1948) 2 x MLB All-Star
- Johnny Niggeling (1933)
- Bill Norman (1947-1951, MGR)
- Dave Pope (1950-1951)
- Allie Reynolds (1962) 6 x MLB All-Star; 1952 AL ERA Title
- Jack Scott (1931)
- Jose Santiago (1950-1951)
- Joe Shaute (1938)
- Harry Simpson (1949) MLB All-Star
- Al Smith (1948-1949) 3 x MLB All-Star
- Scott Stratton (1900) 1890 ERA Title
- Fred Thomas (1948) Outfielder, first black player in the Eastern League
- Hal White (1939)
- Gene Woodling (1942-1943) MLB All-Star
- Heinie Zimmerman (1907) 1912 NL Triple Crown

== Year-by-year record ==
Year	Record	Finish	Manager	Playoffs
1888	59-48	3rd	James Donnelly / John Irwin	none
1905	70-52	3rd	John Sharrott	none
1906	52-76	8th	John Sharrott / Mike Donovan	none
1907	69-66	5th	Abel Lizotte	none
1908	60-77	7th	Abel Lizotte / Robert Drury	none
1909	88-53	1st	Malachi Kittridge	League Champs
1910	85-53	1st	Bill Clymer	League Champs
1911	82-61	1st	Bill Clymer	League Champs
1912	81-57	2nd	Bill Clymer	none
1913	84-56	2nd	Joe McCarthy	none
1914	79-55	2nd	Joe McCarthy	none
1915	54-60	6th	Peter Noonan	none
1916	62-63	4th	Joe McCarthy	none
1917	81-37	1st	Jack Calhoun	League Champs
1923	47-74	5th	Tom Downey	none
1924	51-82	7th	Tom Downey / Dutch Brannan / Joe Wall	none
1925	60-71	7th	James Sharp / George Maisel	
1926	56-73	7th	George Maisel / Earl Potteiger	none
1927	80-56	2nd	Earl Potteiger	none
1928	71-65	3rd	Mike Konnick	none
1929	50-86	8th	Mike Konnick / Don Sykes / Punch Knoll	none
1930	79-59	1st	Mike McNally	League Champs
1931	80-59	2nd	Mike McNally	none
1932	78-61	1st	Mike McNally	League Champs
1933	71-67	3rd	Elmer Yoter	none
1934	66-67	5th	Elmer Yoter	
1935	79-57	2nd	Elmer Yoter	
1936	62-75	7th	Jake Pitler	
1937	77-57	2nd	Mike McNally	Lost League Finals
1938	51-87	8th	Mike McNally	
1939	58-82	8th	Eddie Phillips	
1940	56-76	8th	Earl Wolgamot	
1941	87-51	1st	Earl Wolgamot	Lost in 1st round
1942	79-61	4th	Earl Wolgamot	Lost in 1st round
1943	77-61	4th	Tony Lazzeri	Lost in 1st round
1944	51-89	8th	Jack Sanford	
1945	78-59	2nd	Dick Porter / Mike McNally	Lost League Finals
1946	76-62	3rd	Dick Porter	Lost in 1st round
1947	80-60	3rd	Bill Norman	Lost in 1st round
1948	48-91	8th	Bill Norman	
1953	54-95	7th	Danny Litwhiler	
1954	80-59	1st	Danny Carnevale	Lost in 1st round
1955	59-78 overall	--	Mike McCormick	Final Wilkes-Barre game July 29, 1955 after which moved to Johnstown
