= Tebeau =

Tebeau is a surname. It may refer to:

- Charlton W. Tebeau (1904–2000), American historian
- George Tebeau (1861–1923), American baseball player, outfielder in Major League Baseball
- Patsy Tebeau (1864–1918), American baseball player, first baseman, third baseman, and manager in Major League Baseball
- Pussy Tebeau (1870–1950), American baseball player, right fielder in Major League Baseball
- William Tebeau (1925–2013), in 1948 became the first African-American man to graduate from Oregon State College
