= Troy Ball Club Grounds =

Baseball ground in Watervliet, New York, US

- Interactive map of Troy Ball Club Grounds
- Location: West Troy, New York (Note: In 1896, the Village of West Troy was incorporated into the City of Watervliet.)
- Coordinates: 42°43′56″N 73°42′41″W
- Capacity: 800
- Surface: Grass

Construction
- Built: 1882

Tenants
- Troy Trojans (NL) (1882); Troy Trojans (HRL) (1886); Troy Trojans (IA) (1888); Troy Trojans (NYSL) (1890); Troy Trojans (EA) (1891); Troy Trojans (EL) (1892–1893); Troy Washerwomen (EL) (1894); Troy Trojans (NYSL) (1895)

Troy Ball Club Grounds, also known as the West Troy Grounds, was a baseball ground in West Troy, New York. It was home to the Troy Trojans baseball club of the National League for the 1882 season. The venue was later used for minor league baseball and college football.

== History ==
Following the 1881 season, the Troy Trojans decided to relocate from Haymakers' Grounds in Lansingburgh because the team's prior ballpark location was becoming too valuable for development. Constructed in 1882 at a cost of $5,000, Troy Ball Club Grounds was built on the former site of a wheat field and was considered to be one of the best baseball diamonds in the country. However, attendance at the new ballpark was weakened by the team's record on the field and poor transportation access to the site.

According to the Troy city directory for 1882, the ballpark was located at "Genesee Street opposite the West Troy Depot" of the Delaware & Hudson Railroad (D&H). Genesee was later renamed 19th Street and is a major thoroughfare in Watervliet, forming part of New York State Route 2. The 1885 Sanborn map shows "Base Ball Park" south of Genesee and east of the railroad tracks.

The ballpark was subsequently used from 1885 to 1896 by the Troy Trojans, a baseball team that also went by the name of the Troy Washerwomen and played in minor leagues including the Hudson River League, International Association, New York State League, Eastern Association and the Eastern League.

Visiting baseball clubs would stay in downtown Troy and were taken to and from the ballpark by horse-drawn wagon. After a game played on July 3, 1893, members of the Buffalo Bisons were celebrating their victory by singing and their driver did not see a D&H train approaching the grade crossing until the last minute, and several players were injured when they jumped off the wagon.

In 1886, the venue served as the site of the earliest football games played by Rensselaer Polytechnic Institute (RPI). That season, RPI played its first game against the Ridgefield Athletic Club and its first intercollegiate game against Union College, both of which took place in West Troy. The first game in the lasting RPI–Union football rivalry was recorded as a 11–4 victory for RPI, but Union disputed the score over the grounds of corrupt and inept officiating.

The 1903 Sanborn map shows the site of the ballpark as vacant fields.
