= Schenectady Blue Jays =

- 1946–1957; Schenectady, New York

Minor league affiliations
- Previous classes: Class A (1951–1957); Class C (1946–1950)
- League: Eastern League (1951–1957); Can–Am League (1946–1950)

Major league affiliations
- Previous teams: Philadelphia Phillies (1946–1957)

Minor league titles
- League titles: 1947; 1956

Team data
- Previous parks: McNearney Stadium

The Schenectady Blue Jays were an American minor league baseball franchise based in Schenectady, New York, for 12 consecutive seasons, 1946–57. They played as a member of the Class C Can–Am League through 1950, and the Class A Eastern League thereafter. The Blue Jays were affiliated with Major League Baseball's Philadelphia Phillies and played at McNearney Stadium from the middle of 1946 through their final season.

== Franchise history ==
The Blue Jays were founded at the beginning of the post-World War II boom in minor league baseball. Schenectady had previously been represented by a team in the Negro leagues, the Mohawk Giants (1913–1914), and by the Schenectady Dorpians, Schenectady Electricians and Schenectady Frog Alleys teams of the New York State League (1895–1904) and the Eastern Association (1909).

The Phillies, purchased during the war by the R. R. M. Carpenter family, began to build out their farm system in 1946 and added Schenectady to their roster of affiliates. The nickname Blue Jays became the Phillies' secondary moniker before the start of the 1944 season and was common to at least two other Philadelphia farm teams, the Class C Salina Blue Jays and Class D Green Bay Blue Jays. The 1946 Schenectady Jays finished seventh in the eight-team Can-Am League. But the 1947 edition, managed by Leon Riley, father of future National Basketball Association player, coach and executive Pat Riley, won the league pennant by 13 games and the playoff championship; it drew over 146,000 fans, almost 60,000 more than the second-most-popular Can-Am League team.

After the 1950 season, the Phillies replaced their Eastern League affiliate, the Utica Blue Sox, with the Schenectady Blue Jays, who moved up two levels to Class A, which was then almost equivalent to today's Double-A ranking. Schenectady won the Eastern League championship in 1956 and finished a strong second in 1957, but attendance had fallen to below 60,000 and the Phillies transferred their affiliation to the Williamsport Grays for 1958, thus ending the Blue Jays' 12-year lifespan.

== Year-by-year record ==
Year	Record	Finish Full Season	League	Attendance	Manager	Postseason
1946	45–75	Seventh	Can–Am League	53,239	Bill Cronin	DNQ
1947	86–51	First	Can–Am	146,227	Leon Riley	League champions
1948	69–68	Fifth	Can–Am	146,421	Leon Riley	DNQ
1949	58–80	Seventh	Can–Am	115,966	Dick Carter	DNQ
1950	88–46	Second	Can–Am	76,853	Dick Carter	Lost to Amsterdam in first round
1951	73–66	Fifth	Eastern League	93,559	Leon Riley	DNQ
1952	73–65	Fourth	Eastern	81,912	Dan Carnevale	Lost to Binghamton in first round
1953	86–65	Third	Eastern	66,320	Skeeter Newsome	Lost to Reading in first round
1954	57–83	Eighth	Eastern	45,529	Snuffy Stirnweiss; Lew Krausse Sr.	DNQ
1955	74–64	Fourth	Eastern	73,585	Don Osborn	Lost to Allentown in finals
1956	84–54	First	Eastern	66,458	Dick Carter	League champions
1957	83–57	Second	Eastern	59,522	Dick Carter	Lost to Reading in first round

== Notable alumni ==
- Harry Anderson
- Ed Bouchee
- Don Cardwell
- Chuck Essegian
- Turk Farrell
- Pancho Herrera
- Eddie Kasko
- Tommy Lasorda
- Steve Ridzik
- Jack Sanford
- Carl Sawatski
- Barney Schultz
