= Amsterdam–Gloversville–Johnstown Jags =

- 1890–1908; (1890 1894–1895, 1902–1908); Amsterdam, New York

Minor league affiliations
- Class: Independent (1890); Class B (1894–1895, 1902–1908)
- League: New York State League (1890 1894–1895, 1902–1908 )

Major league affiliations
- Team: None

Minor league titles
- League titles (2): 1894; 1905

Team data
- Name: Johnstown–Gloversville (1890); Amsterdam Carpet Tacks (1894); Amsterdam Red Stockings (1895); Johnstown Buckskins (1894–1895); Gloversville Glovers (1895); Amsterdam–Gloversville–Johnstown Jags (1902); Amsterdam–Gloversville–Johnstown Hypens (1903–1904); Amsterdam–Gloversville–Johnstown Jags (1905–1908); Gloversville–Johnstown Jags (1908)
- Ballpark: JAG Park - Gloversville, New York (1904–1908); Guy Park - Amsterdam, New York (1902–1908)

The Amsterdam–Gloversville–Johnstown Jags was a primary moniker of the minor league baseball teams representing the cities of Amsterdam, New York, Gloversville, New York and Johnstown, New York between 1890 and 1908. The Amsterdam and Amsterdam–Gloversville–Johnstown teams played as members of the New York State League in 1894 and 1895 and from 1902 to 1908.

Baseball Hall of Fame member Jack Chesbro pitched for the 1895 Johnstown Buckskins.

The teams hosted minor league home games at JAG Park in Gloversville, New York and at Guy Park in Amsterdam, New York.

== History ==
Minor league baseball began in the cities in 1890, when the Johnstown–Gloversville team began play as members of the six–team Independent level New York State League. The team ended the season with a 46-46 record, placing fourth, while playing the season under manager John Case.

Minor league baseball began in Amsterdam in 1894, when the Amsterdam Carpet Tacks won the 1894 New York State League championship. Playing in the Class B level league, the Amsterdam Carpet Tacks finished the regular season with a final record of 30–21, playing under managers Walter Beebe, John Bartholomew and Bart Howard. Amsterdam finished 2.5 games ahead of the second place Poughkeepsie Bridge Citys and 3.5 games ahead of the third place Johnstown Buckskins in the six–team league final standings. Amsterdam pitcher Chauncey Baldwin led the league with 11 wins.

Amsterdam continued play in the 1895 New York State League. The Amsterdam Red Stockings finished with a record of 29–22, placing second in the final standings. Playing under manager Tom Donovan, Amsterdam ended the season mere percentage points behind the first place Binghamton Crickets in the final standings, as the league reduced from eight teams to four teams during the season. Gloversville and Johnstown both fielded teams to begin play in the 1895 league, with the Gloversville Glovers and Johnstown Buckskins teams both folding on July 4, 1895.

Baseball Hall of Fame member Jack Chesbro pitched for the 1895 Johnstown Buckskins in his first professional season.

The 1902 Amsterdam–Gloversville–Johnstown Jags resumed play as members of the Class B level New York State League. The "Jags" moniker derives from the first letter of each city. The 1902 Amsterdam–Gloversville–Johnstown Jags finished last in the New York State League final standings. The Jags had a record of 29–72, to place eighth in the league under the direction of manager Tommy Dowd. The Jags finished 37.0 games behind the first place Albany Senators. The team played home games at Guy Park in Amsterdam, New York.

The team switched monikers in 1903, as the Amsterdam–Gloversville–Johnstown Hyphens continued play in the New York State League and again finished in last place. The 1903 Hyphens finished with a record of 41–82 under managers Doc Hazelton, Dan Shannon and Clyde Williams. The Hyphens finished 33.5 games behind the first place Schenectady Frog Alleys.

The 1904 Hyphens began playing at both JAG Park in Gloversville and Guy Park in Amsterdam. The 1904 Amsterdam–Johnstown–Gloversville Hyphens finished 65–61, placing fourth in the New York State League, playing the season under manager Howard Earl. The Hypens finished 21.5 games behind the first place Syracuse Stars in the final standings.

The Amsterdam–Gloversville–Johnstown Jags won the 1905 New York State League Championship. The Jags finished with a record of 71–51, placing first in the New York State League final standings, 0.5 games ahead of the 2nd place Syracuse Stars. Manager Howard Earl led the team to the championship.

The 1906 Amsterdam–Gloversville–Johnstown Jags had a regular season record of 66–68. The Jags placed fifth in the New York State League standings under returning manager Howard Earl, finishing 17.5 games behind the first place Scranton Miners.

The Amsterdam–Gloversville–Johnstown Jags finished last in the 1907 New York State League. Their record of 39–95, left the team eighth in the league under manager Howard Earl, finishing 42.5 games behind the first place Albany Senators.

The Amsterdam–Gloversville–Johnstown Jags relocated in 1908 and finished last in their final season. The Jags began the season with a 1–8 record, when they dropped Amsterdam from their franchise on May 18, 1908. The Gloversville–Johnstown Jags were 11–54 on July 22, 1908, when the franchise relocated to Elmira, New York, where they finished the season as the Elmira Colonels. The team finished in eighth place with a 36–104 overall record in 1908. The managers were Hank Ramsey and Louis Bacon, as the team finished 50.5 games behind the first place Scranton Miners.

The cities were without a minor league team until the 1938 Amsterdam Rugmakers and Gloversville-Johnstown Glovers teams began play as members of the Class C level Can–Am League.

== The ballparks ==
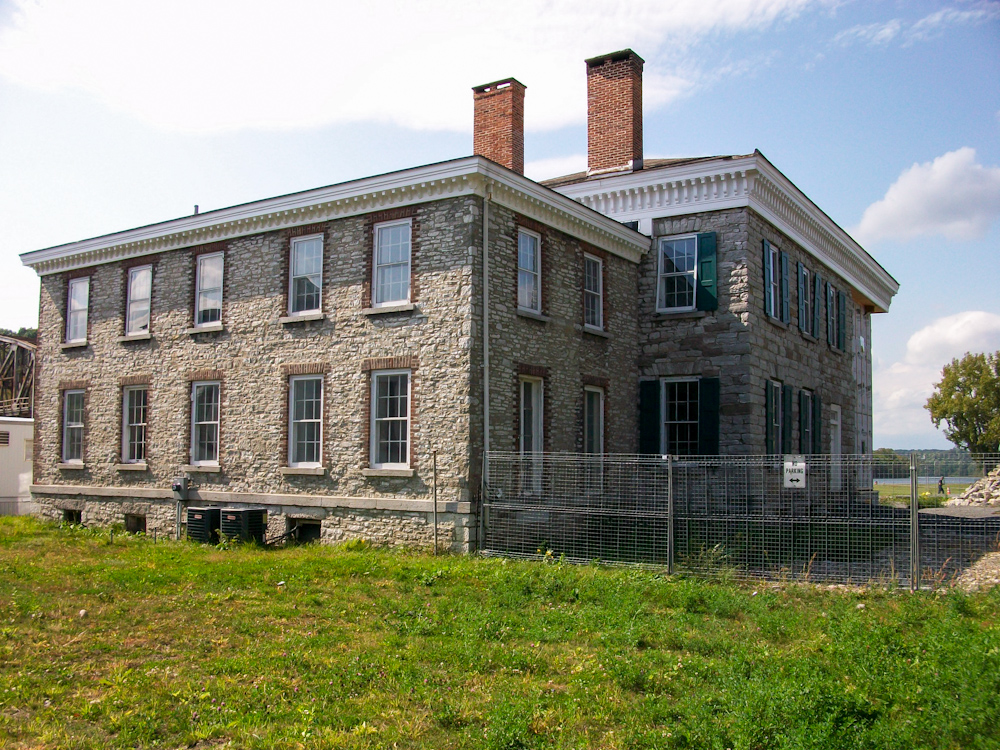
(2012) Guy Park. National Register of Historic Places. Amsterdam, New York.

The played minor league home games at Guy Park in Amsterdam, New York, for the duration of the Amsterdam franchises. Today, the site is the Guy Park State Historical Site.

In Gloversville, New York, the team played select home games at JAG Park. The ballpark was rebuilt and known as "A.J.& G Baseball Park" beginning in 1906. JAG Park was designed by F.L. Comstock and built by E.A. Satterlee for $3,088. The ballpark was built on six acres of land on Harrison Street, midway between Gloversville, New York and Johnstown, New York. Today, the ballpark is called Parkhurst Field and is still in use.

== Timeline ==
Year(s)	# Yrs.	Team	Level	League
1890	1	Johnstown–Gloversville	Independent	New York State League
1894 (1)	1	Amsterdam Carpet Tacks	Class B	New York State League
1894 (2)	1	Johnstown Buckskins	Class B	New York State League
1895 (1)	1	Johnstown Buckskins	Class B	New York State League
1895 (2)	1	Amsterdam Red Stockings	Class B	New York State League
1895 (3)	1	Gloversville Glovers	Class B	New York State League
1902	1	Amsterdam–Gloversville–Johnstown Jags	Class B	New York State League
1903–1904	2	Amsterdam–Gloversville–Johnstown Hyphens	Class B	New York State League
1905–1908	4	Amsterdam–Gloversville–Johnstown Jags	Class B	New York State League
1908 (2)	1	Gloversville–Johnstown Jags	Class B	New York State League

== Year-by-year records ==
Year	Record	Finish	Manager	Playoffs/Notes
1890	46–46	4th	John Case	No playoffs held
1894	30–21	1st	Walter Beebe / John Bartholomew / Bart Howard	League champions
1895	29–22	2nd	Tom Donovan	No playoffs held
1902	29–72	8th	Tommy Dowd	No playoffs held
1903	41–82	8th	Doc Hazelton / Dan Shannon / Clyde Williams	No playoffs held
1904	65–61	4th	Howard Earl	No playoffs held
1905	71–51	1st	Howard Earl	League champions
1906	66–68	5th	Howard Earl	No playoffs held
1907	39–95	8th	Howard Earl	No playoffs held
1908	36–104	8th	Hank Ramsey / Louis Bacon	Moved to Elmira July 28 (11–54)

== Notable alumni ==
- Jack Chesbro (1895) Inducted Baseball Hall of Fame, 1946
- George Bell (1904–1905)
- Frank Bird (1890)
- Joe Birmingham (1906)
- Pete Childs (1902, 1904–1907)
- Jim Devlin (1895)
- Tom Donovan (1895)
- Tommy Dowd (1902, MGR)
- Bull Durham (1903)
- Howard Earl (1904–1907, MGR)
- Harry Fuller (1894)
- Billy Ging (1902–1904)
- Gene Good (1907)
- Doc Hazelton (1902), (1903, MGR)
- Mike Hickey (1894)
- Ed Hilley (1904–1906)
- Charlie Malay (1902–1904)
- Charlie McCullough (1890)
- Sandy McDougal (1902–1903)
- Jim McGuire (1895)
- Harry McNeal (1907)
- Frank McPartlin (1894)
- Tom Messitt (1895)
- Doc Oberlander (1890)
- George Sharrott (1894)
- George Shoch (1905)
- Hank Simon (1905)
- Jack Slattery (1902)
- Deke White (1894)

== See also ==
- Amsterdam Carpet Tacks players
- Amsterdam Red Stockings players
- Amsterdam-Gloversville-Johnstown Hyphens players
- Amsterdam-Gloversville-Johnstown Jags players
- Gloversville Glovers players
- Johnstown Buckskins players
