= Auburn Cayugas =

- 1946–1950; (1877, 1888–1889, 1897–1899, 1906–1907, 1936–1940, 1946–1951); Auburn, New York

Minor league affiliations
- Class: Class C (1897, 1899); Class D (1906–1907); Class C (1938, 1940, 1946–1951)
- League: League Alliance (1877); Central New York League (1888); New York State League (1889, 1897–1899); Empire State League (1906–1907); Can–Am League (1938, 1940); Border League (1946–1951)

Major league affiliations
- Team: Boston Red Sox (1948)

Minor league titles
- League titles (2): 1888; 1889
- Wild card berths (2): 1947; 1949

Team data
- Name: Auburn Auburnians (1877); Auburn Yankees (1888–1889); Auburn Maroons (1897–1898); Auburn Pioneers (1899); Auburn (1906–1907); Auburn Bouleys (1938); Auburn Colts (1940); Auburn Cayugas (1946–1950); Auburn Falcons (1951)
- Ballpark: Seward Avenue Park (1877, 1888–1889, 1897–1899); Falcon Park (1938, 1940, 1946–1951)

The Auburn Cayugas was a primary moniker of the minor league baseball teams based in Auburn, New York and their namesake Cayuga County, New York between 1877 and 1951. Auburn teams played as members of the 1877 League Alliance, 1888 Central New York League, New York State League (1889, 1897–1899), Empire State League (1906–1907), Can–Am League (1938, 1940) and Border League (1946–1951), winning two league championships.

The Auburn Cayugas were a minor league affiliate of the Boston Red Sox in 1948.

Auburn continued minor league play from 1958 through 2020, evolving into the Auburn Doubledays.

== History ==
Minor league baseball started in Auburn, New York in 1877. The Auburn Auburnians played the 1877 season as a member of the League Alliance, which had over thirty teams. The manager was Billy Arnold.

The Auburn Yankees played as a member of the 1888 Central New York League. Auburn won the 1888 Central New York League Championship with a 22–10 regular season record. The Central New York League permanently disbanded after the 1888 season.

The Auburn Yankees won the New York State League Championship in 1889. Auburn finished the season in first place with a 32–19 record under Manager Frank Leonard. Auburn finished 2.0 games ahead of the Elmira, New York team, in winning the six-team league championship. Auburn did not return to the New York State League in 1890.

The Auburn Maroons returned to play in the Independent New York State League in 1897. The 1987 Maroons finished 50–41, to place third in the five-team league, playing the season under Manager Tim Shinnick. Auburn finished 4.5 games behind the league champion Canandaigua Rustlers. On August 24, 1889, Auburn hosted of one of the first games played under electric lights at Seward Avenue Park.

The 1898 Auburn Maroons placed third in the eight-team New York State League with a record of 52–50. The 1898 Managers were Tim Shinnick, Barney McManus and Mickey Finn. Auburn finished 5.5 games behind league champion Canandaigua Rustlers.

The Auburn Pioneers continued play as members of the Class C level New York State League in 1899. The Auburn Prisoners were managed by Tim Shinnick and Charles Faatz. Auburn had a 27–43 record when the franchise moved to Troy, New York on August 1, 1899. The team finished the season as the Troy Washerwomen and combined for an overall record of 43–69, to place seventh in the New York State League final standings.

Auburn joined the Class D level Empire State League in 1906. The team was owned and managed by Willard Hoagland. Auburn ended the season in third place, with a 37–35 record, playing under Hoagland. Auburn finished 7.0 games behind the champion Seneca Falls, New York team.

In 1907, Auburn again placed third in the Empire State League. Auburn had a 44–39 record under Willard Hoagland, finishing 10.0 games behind the champion Oswego Starchmakers. The Empire State League permanently folded after the 1907 season.

After the 1937 season, the Smiths Falls Beavers of the Class C level Can–Am League were purchased by Auburn investors and relocated. The 1938 Auburn Bouleys finished with a 49–68 record, placing seventh in the Can–Am League regular season final standings. The Auburn manager was John Cimpi. Season attendance was 16,178, an average of 277 per home game. After finishing last in the eight–team league in home attendance, the franchise was sold and moved to become the Utica Braves in 1939.

The Auburn use of the "Bouleys" moniker corresponded to local industry and history in the era. The team was named after William Bouley, a construction leader in the era, who headed the investors that purchased the franchise. Today, Bouley Construction is in operation in Auburn, New York.

In 1940, the Auburn Colts returned to minor league play as members of the Can–Am League. The Colts finished last in the eight–team league. Auburn ended the season with a record of 28–93, placing eighth in the Can–Am standings. The Colts' Manager was George Lee. The Auburn Colts season attendance was 10,040, an average of 166 per game. The franchise folded after the 1940 season.

In 1946, minor league baseball resumed in Auburn. The Auburn Cayugas became charter members of the Class C level Border League, winning the pennant and qualifying for the playoffs in their first season. The 1946 six-team league standings featured the Auburn Cayugas (72–44), Granby Red Sox (54–60), Kingston Ponies (58–55), Ogdensburg Maples (50–68), Sherbrooke Canadians (46–71) and Watertown Athletics (69–51).

The Auburn adoption of the "Cayugas" moniker corresponds to Auburn, New York being located within Cayuga County.

The 1946 Auburn Cayugas, captured the Border League pennant in their first season. The Cayugas finished the regular season with a record of 72–44 to place first in the Border League. Playing under manager Phillip Hearn, Auburn was defeated by the Kingston Ponies 3 games to 1 in the playoffs. Auburn season attendance was 48,683, third best in the Border League.

The Auburn Cayugas qualified for the playoffs in 1947. The Cayugas finished 66–60 to place third in the 1947 Border League regular season, playing under returning manager Phillip Hearn. In the playoffs, the Ottawa Nationals swept Auburn in four games. The 1947 Auburn season attendance was 59,637.

The 1948 Auburn Cayugas were a minor league affiliate of the Boston Red Sox. With a Border League regular season record of 49–78, the team placed sixth, playing the season under manager Phillip Hearn. Auburn did not qualify for the playoffs. Season attendance was 43,102, an average of 679 per game.

The Auburn Cayugas advanced to the 1949 Border League Finals. With a 67–62 regular season record, the team placed fourth in the regular season standings, playing under returning manager Phillip Hearn. Auburn qualified for the playoffs. In the first round, the Auburn Cayugas defeated the Ottawa Senators in a seven–game series 4 games to 3. In the Border League Finals, the Geneva Robins defeated Auburn 4 games to 2. Season attendance was 55,634.

In 1950, Auburn missed the playoffs. With a 50–77 record, placing sixth in the Border League, while playing the season under managers William Sisler, Tom Accardo and Bill Gates. The Cayugas failed to qualify for the playoffs. 1950 season attendance was 41,755.

With Auburn continuing play in the 1951 Border League, the league folded mid-season. The Auburn Falcons, were in fourth place under Bill Gates at 26–26, when the Border League permanently disbanded on July 16, 1951.

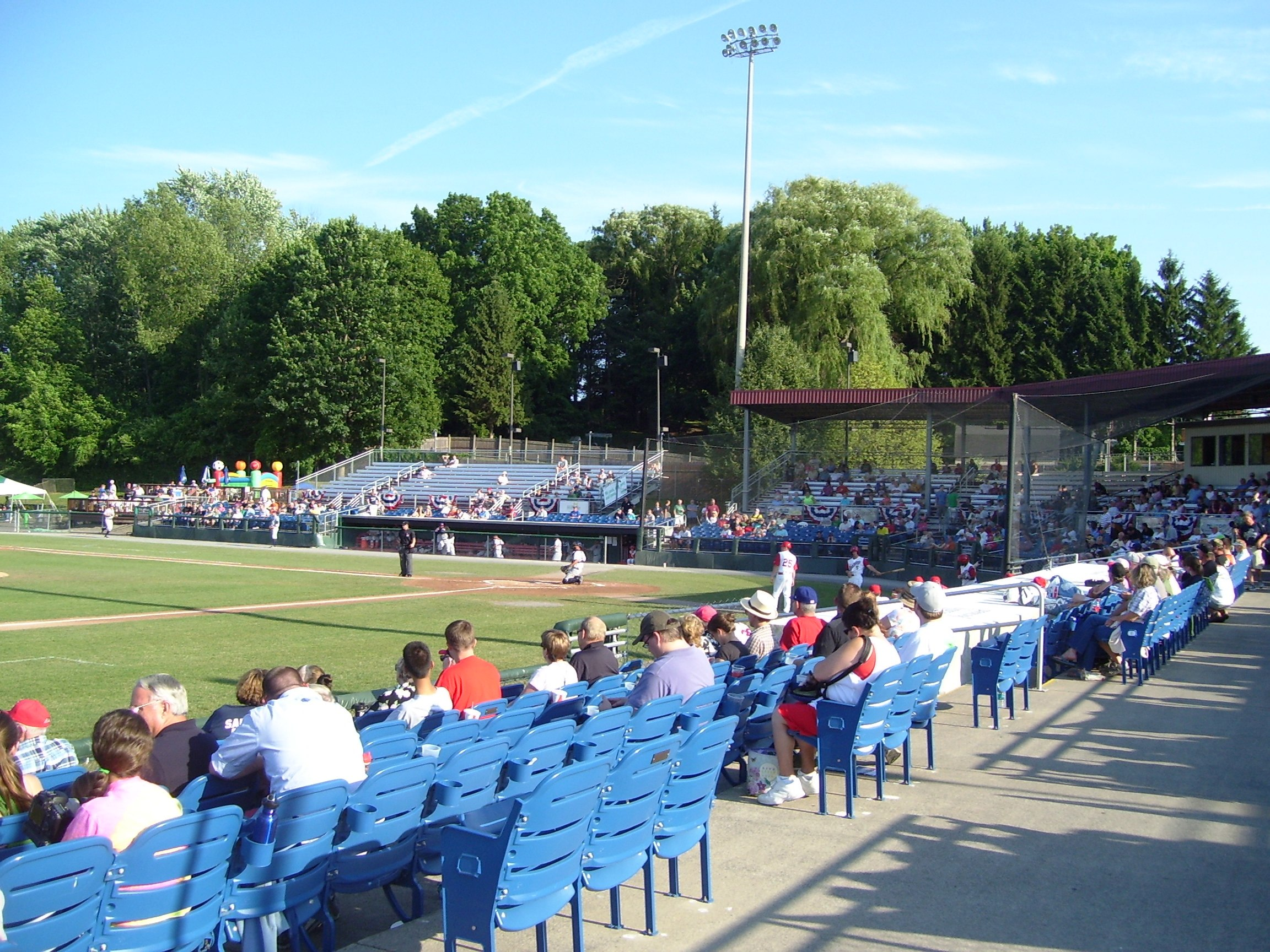
(2012) Auburn Doubledays game. Falcon Park. Auburn, New York

Auburn was without minor league baseball until the 1958 Auburn Yankees began play as members of the New York-Penn League. Today, Auburn remains in the New York-Penn League as home to the Auburn Doubledays, members of the Perfect Game Collegiate Baseball League. Selected alumni of all Auburn minor league teams are honored in the Auburn Baseball Wall of Fame at Falcon Park.

== The ballparks ==
Beginning in 1877, early Auburn teams including the Auburn Maroons were noted to have played minor league home games at Seward Avenue Park. On August 24, 1889, the ballpark hosted Auburn in playing one of the first baseball games under electric lights.

In seasons between 1927 and 1951, Auburn teams played at Falcon Park. The address was 108 North Division Street. Built in 1927 by the Polish Falcons, the ballpark was torn down and rebuilt following the 1994 baseball season. Today, the new Falcon Park is home to the Auburn Doubledays of the Prefect Game Collegiate League.

== Notable alumni ==
- John Abadie (1877)
- Billy Arnold (1877, MGR)
- Phil Baker (1877)
- Joe Berry (1899)
- Bill Bradley (1898–1899) Cleveland Indians Hall of Fame
- George Browne (1899)
- Tom Burns (1877)
- Lou Castro (1899)
- Morrie Critchley (1877)
- Harry Croft (1899)
- Ike Delock (1948)
- Bill Duggleby (1897, 1899)
- Fred Dunlap (1877) Batting Champion
- Bill Eagle (1899)
- Ben Egan (1907)
- Mal Eason (1898–1899)
- Sam Field (1877)
- Johnny Gee (1951)
- Jack Gilbert (1899)
- Willard Hoagland (1906–1907, MGR)
- Jim Keenan (1877)
- Tommy Leach (1898)
- George Lee (1940, MGR) Canadian Baseball Hall of Fame (1988)
- Don Liddle (1946)
- Jimmy Macullar (1877)
- Tom Mansell (1877)
- Jim Mertz (1938)
- Tom Messitt (1899)
- Ed Murphy (1899)
- Pete Noonan (1906)
- Chief Roseman (1877)
- Cyclone Ryan (1899)
- Tim Shinnick (1889), (1897–1899, MGR)
- Dummy Stephenson (1899)
- Alan Storke (1906)
- Ray Tift (1906)
- Bill Tobin (1877)

== See also ==
- Auburn (minor league baseball) players
- Auburn Maroons players.
