= Loudenslager =

Loudenslager is a surname of German origin. Notable people with the surname include:

- Charlie Loudenslager (1881–1933), American baseball player
- Henry C. Loudenslager (1852–1911), American politician
- Leo Loudenslager (1944–1997), American aviator
