= Jack Calhoun =

American baseball player (1879–1947)

- Third baseman
- Born: December 14, 1879; Pittsburgh, Pennsylvania, U.S.
- Died: February 27, 1947 (aged 67); Cincinnati, Ohio, U.S.
- Batted: Right Threw: Right

MLB debut
- June 27, 1902, for the St. Louis Cardinals

Last MLB appearance
- September 18, 1902, for the St. Louis Cardinals

MLB statistics
- Batting average: .156
- Home runs: 0
- RBI: 8
- Stats at Baseball Reference

Teams
- St. Louis Cardinals (1902)

John Charles Calhoun (December 14, 1879 – February 27, 1947), nicknamed Jack and Red, was an American professional baseball player for the St. Louis Cardinals in 1902.

The 22-year-old ballplayer made his major league debut on June 27, 1902 and played in his final game on September 18 of that year. In 20 games (64 at-bats), he hit .156 with two doubles, one triple and eight RBI.

His minor league career lasted considerably longer. He spent 12 seasons in the minors, hitting .254 in 1,314 games. Perhaps his best season was in 1904 with the Haverhill Hustlers - that season, he hit .314 in 118 games.

Calhoun also managed in the minor leagues for eight seasons. He first the Jersey City Skeeters in 1909, replacing Gene McCann and being replaced by Jack Ryan. His next managerial assignment was in 1911 with the Elmira Colonels, with whom he managed until 1912. From 1913 to 1916, he headed the Binghamton Bingoes, leading them to league championships in 1913 and 1915. He last managed the Wilkes-Barre Barons in 1917, leading them to a league championship as well.

Following his playing and managing career, he served as a district police commissioner and police chief.
