= Michael Donovan (disambiguation) =

Michael Donovan (1953–2026) was a Canadian voice actor.

Michael Donovan may also refer to:

- Michael Donovan (kidnapper) (1969–2024), jailed for the kidnapping of Shannon Matthews in January 2009
- Mike Donovan (musician) (born 1971), San Francisco based musician
- See Powell and Donovan for Mike Donovan, roboticist in Isaac Asimov stories
- Professor Mike Donovan (1847–1918), 19th-century middleweight boxing champion
- Mike Donovan (baseball) (1881–1938), American baseball player
- Mike Donovan, character in the science fiction TV series V, played by Marc Singer
- Michael Donovan (producer) (born 1953), Canadian film producer and screenwriter
- Mike Donovan (Dexter), a fictional character in the TV series Dexter
