= Dick Kauffman =

American baseball player (1888–1948)

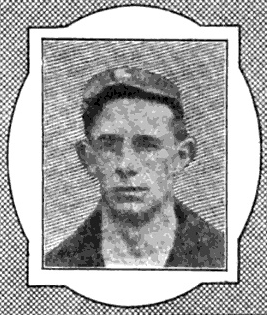
- First baseman
- Born: June 22, 1888; East Lewisburg, Pennsylvania, U.S.
- Died: April 16, 1948 (aged 59); Mifflinburg, Pennsylvania, U.S.
- Batted: Both Threw: Right

MLB debut
- September 17, 1914, for the St. Louis Browns

Last MLB appearance
- June 12, 1915, for the St. Louis Browns

MLB statistics
- Batting average: .259
- Hits: 36
- Runs batted in: 16
- Stats at Baseball Reference

Teams
- St. Louis Browns (1914–1915)

Howard Richard Kauffman (June 22, 1888 – April 16, 1948) was an American professional baseball player whose career spanned 11 seasons, two of which were spent in Major League Baseball with the St. Louis Browns (1914–15). Kauffman, a first baseman, compiled a career major league batting average of .259 with 10 runs scored, 36 hits, nine doubles, two triples, and 16 runs batted in in 44 games played. His professional career began in 1911 with the minor league York White Roses. Kauffman's first major league season was 1914. He was again called-up in 1915. After that season, he played exclusively in the minor leagues. He has a career minor league batting average of .279 with 1,239 hits in 1,217 games played. In the minors, he played with the York White Roses (1911–12), Elmira Colonels (1913–14), Atlanta Crackers (1915, 1920–21), and Nashville Volunteers (1916–19). Before turning professional, Kauffman, an East Lewisburg, Pennsylvania, native, attended Bucknell University, and Susquehanna University, respectively.

== Early life ==
Kauffman was born on June 22, 1888, in East Lewisburg, Pennsylvania, to Charles, and Emma Kauffman, both of Pennsylvania. Charles Kauffman worked as a carpenter. Dick Kauffman had four siblings; brothers Calvin, Edwin, and Charles; and sister Jennie. In 1907, Kauffman attended Bucknell University in Lewisburg, Pennsylvania. From 1908 to 1909, Kauffman attended Susquehanna University in Selinsgrove, Pennsylvania. He was a three-sport star at the school, playing football, basketball, and baseball. In 1908, as a member of the school's football team, Kauffman registered a 90-yard run against his former school, Bucknell. Kauffman played outfield on the Susquehanna's baseball team. In a game against Franklin & Marshall College in 1908, he compiled five hits, including three home runs. In 1910, Kauffman played semi-professional baseball in Mifflinburg, Pennsylvania.

== Professional career ==
Kauffman played with the St. Louis Browns for two seasons (1914–15).

Kauffman's professional baseball career began in 1911 with the minor league York White Roses of the Class-B Tri-State League. His team, which represented York, Pennsylvania, featured future and former major league players Ned Crompton, Bill Culp, Rankin Johnson, Sr., Red Oldham, and Joe Wagner. In June, the Gazette and Bulletin of Williamsport, Pennsylvania, wrote that Kauffman was playing "a fine game at first" as a member of the White Roses. On the season, he batted .262 with 98 hits, nine doubles, nine triples, and four home runs in 106 games played. In 1912, Kauffman returned to the Class-B York White Roses. He batted .290 with 119 hits in 110 games played that season.

On January 17, 1913, Kauffman was sold for an undisclosed amount by the York White Roses to the Elmira Colonels of the Class-B New York State League. The 1913 Colonels, who represented Elmira, New York, featured future and former major league players Cad Coles, George Hunter, Charlie Loudenslager, and Lew Ritter. Kauffman batted .278 with 145 hits in 140 games played on the season. he returned to the Elmira club in 1914. He batted .329 with 142 hits in 123 games played. He led the league in batting average. After the season, it was reported that Kauffman was being pursued by numerous major league teams.

Kauffman joined the St. Louis Browns of the American League in September 1914. He made his major league debut on September 17. Kauffman played seven games with the Browns that season. In those games, he batted .267 with one run scored, four hits, one double, and two runs batted in. He re-signed with the Browns in 1915. In 37 games played, he batted .258 with nine runs scored, 32 hits, eight doubles, two triples, and 14 runs batted in. His last major league appearance was on June 12 of that season.

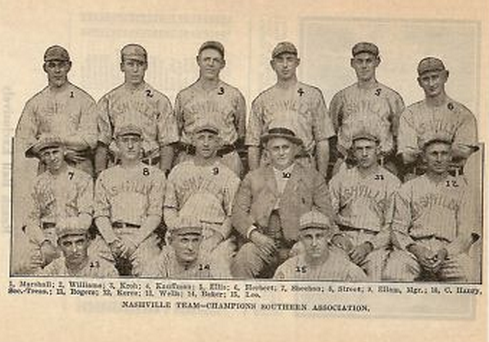
Kauffman (labeled 4) was a member of the 1916 Nashville Volunteers, who won the Southern Association Championship that season.

On June 19, 1915, Kauffman was sold by the St. Louis Browns to the minor league Atlanta Crackers of the Class-A Southern Association. Immediately after being sold, he signed a contract with the Atlanta club, and appeared in his first game with the team. On the season with the Crackers, he batted .260 with 83 hits, 10 doubles, seven triples, and two home runs in 94 games played. In 1916, Kauffman signed with the Nashville Volunteers, who were also members of the Class-A Southern League. He batted .255 with 111 hits, 19 doubles, and six triples in 121 games played that year.

Kauffman re-joined the Nashville Volunteers in 1917. That season, he batted .281 with 163 hits, 34 doubles, nine triples, and three home runs in 153 games played. He finished second in the league in doubles. During his third season with the Volunteers in 1918, Kauffman batted .290 with 54 hits, 10 doubles, and two triples in 50 games played. Kauffman spent his fourth and final season with the Nashville club in 1919. On the season, he batted .269 with 14 doubles, two triples, and five home runs in 64 games played.

In 1920, Kauffman served as a player-manager for the Atlanta Crackers of the Class-A Southern League. He batted .273 with 130 hits, 19 doubles, nine triples, and two home runs in 132 games played that year. Kauffman re-signed with the Crackers in 1921. He did not serve as the team's manager that season. He batted .281 with 128 hits, 19 doubles, 14 triples, and five home runs in 134 games played. It would prove to be his last season in professional baseball.

== Later life ==
By 1942, Kauffman self-employed and living with his wife in Lewisburg, Pennsylvania. He died on April 16, 1948, at the age of 59 in Mifflinburg, Pennsylvania. He was buried at Lewisburg City Cemetery in Lewisburg.
