= Robert Drury (baseball) =

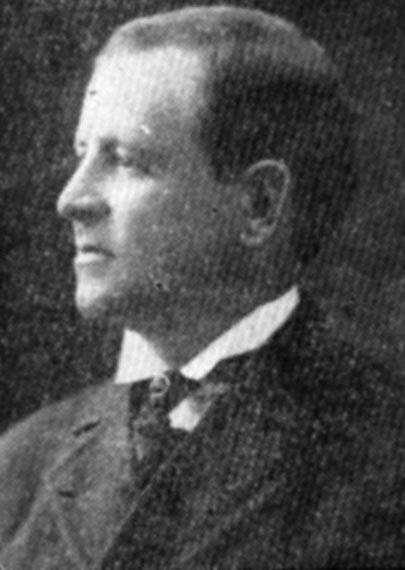
Drury circa 1912.

Robert Blee Drury (January 27, 1878 – August 19, 1933 in Columbus, Ohio, United States) played in minor league baseball for eight seasons, from 1901 to 1908, and managed at that level for four. Not a solid hitter, he never posted a season batting average above .247. He managed the Binghamton Bingoes for part of 1905 (replacing Count Campau) and for all of 1906 and 1907. In 1908, he managed the Wilkes-Barre Barons for the last part of the season, replacing Abel Lizotte. Every team he managed finished seventh in the league.

He served in the Spanish–American War.

He was, at one point, part-owner of the Boston Red Sox, having developed some personal wealth. As well, he became a noted surgeon, graduating from Starling-Loving College. He served as a physician to baseball notables such as Ban Johnson.

He is interred at Green Lawn Cemetery in Columbus.
