= Billy Arnold (baseball) =

American baseball player (1851–1899)

- Outfielder
- Born: March 2, 1851; Middletown, Connecticut, U.S.
- Died: January 17, 1899 (aged 47); Albany, New York, U.S.
- Batted: Unknown Threw: Unknown

MLB debut
- April 26, 1872, for the Middletown Mansfields

Last MLB appearance
- May 2, 1872, for the Middletown Mansfields

MLB statistics
- Games played: 2
- Batting average: .143
- Hits: 1
- Stats at Baseball Reference

Teams
- Middletown Mansfields (1872)

Willis S. Arnold (March 2, 1851 – January 17, 1899) was an American professional baseball player who played as an outfielder in two games of the 1872 season for the Middletown Mansfields in the National Association.

He later served as president of the New York State League and managed the Albany Senators for part of the 1885 season.
