= Rochester Maroons =

Former Minor League Baseball team in Rochester, New York

- 1886–1887; Rochester, New York

Minor league affiliations
- Class: Unclassified (1886–1887)
- League: International Association (1887); International League (1886)

Minor league titles
- Pennants (0): None

Team data
- Name: Rochester Maroons (1886–1887)
- Ballpark: Culver Field (1886–1887)

The Rochester Maroons were a minor league baseball team that played in Rochester, New York, from 1886 to 1887. They were members of the Interstate League in 1886 and the International Association in 1887. Their home games were played Culver Field.

The 1886 Maroons were runners-up for the International League pennant, the league's championship, with a season record of 56–39, which placed them five-and-a-half games behind the first-place Utica Pent-Ups.
