= Jack Ryan (catcher) =

American baseball player (1868–1952)

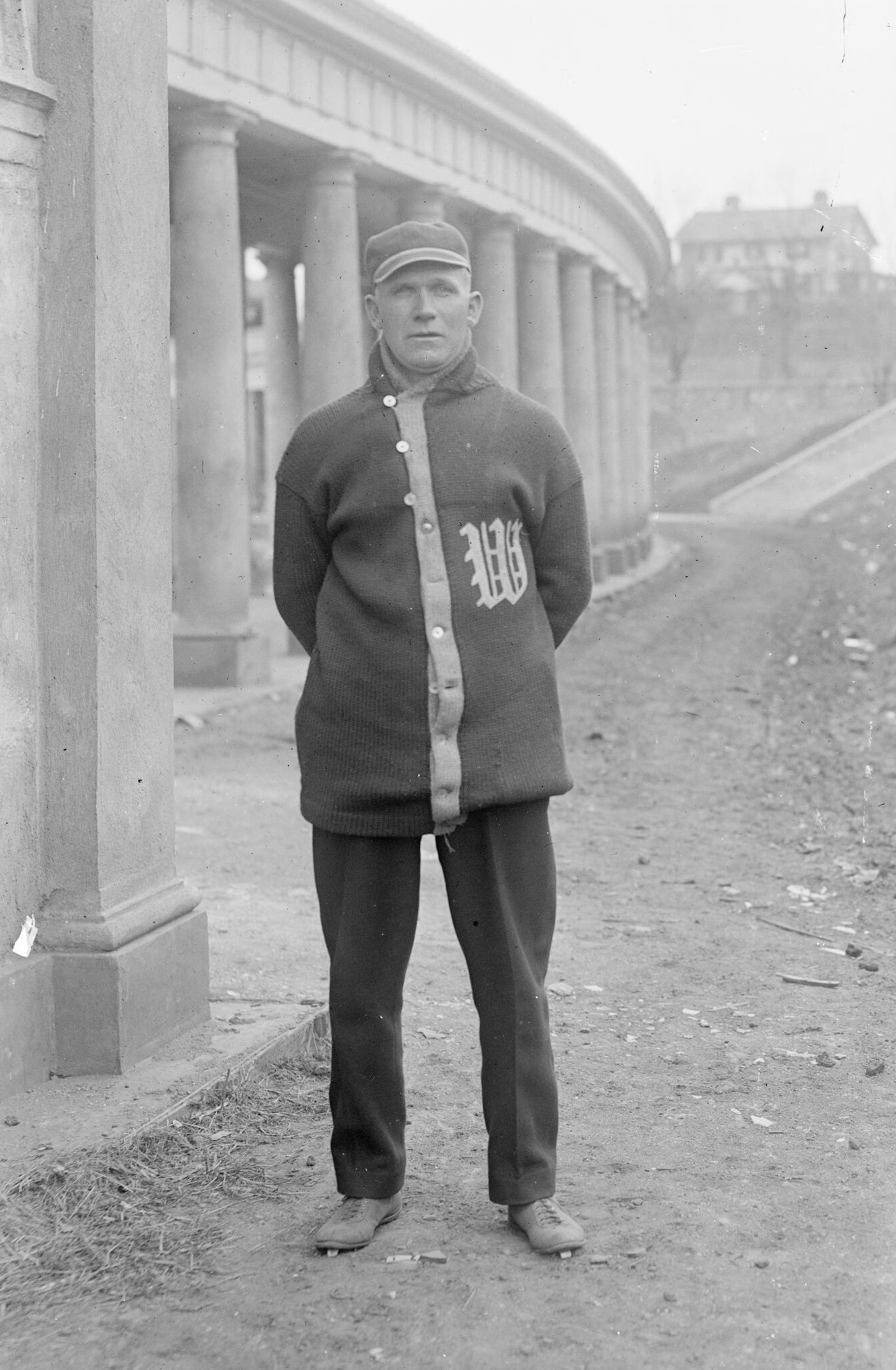
- Catcher
- Born: November 12, 1868; Haverhill, Massachusetts, U.S.
- Died: August 21, 1952 (aged 83); Boston, Massachusetts, U.S.
- Batted: Right Threw: Right

MLB debut
- September 2, 1889, for the Louisville Colonels

Last MLB appearance
- October 4, 1913, for the Washington Senators

MLB statistics
- Batting average: .217
- Home runs: 4
- Runs batted in: 189
- Stats at Baseball Reference

Teams
- Louisville Colonels (1889–1891); Boston Beaneaters (1894–1896); Brooklyn Bridegrooms (1898); Baltimore Orioles (1899); St. Louis Cardinals (1901–1902); Washington Senators (1912–1913)

John Bernard Ryan (November 12, 1868 – August 21, 1952) was an American Major League Baseball catcher. He played from 1889 to 1913 in the American Association, National League and American League. He is one of only 31 players in baseball history to date to have appeared in Major League games in four decades.

Ryan was born in Haverhill, Massachusetts to Irish immigrants. He played baseball from an early age and began playing professionally by age 18.

Ryan made his major league debut with the Louisville Colonels in 1889. The Colonels finished in last place that season, but the following season, with Ryan serving as their starting catcher, they vaulted to first place. In the process, the Colonels became the first team in major league history to move from last place to first place in the span of a single season. The team's remarkable achievement is chronicled in a 2026 book, The 1890 Louisville Cyclones, written by Perry T. Cooper and published by McFarland & Company, Publishers.

Jack Ryan is prominently featured in this book. He was an outstanding defensive catcher with a strong arm; he was particularly adept at throwing out opposing baserunners. Things didn't go so well for him the following season, however; the Colonels sank to seventh place, and in September 1891, Ryan was slashed across the knee by a knife-wielding teammate, Tim Shinnick, during a carriage ride. The wound required surgery and ended Ryan's 1891 season.

Ryan was a manager in the minor leagues in 1909–1911, 1922–1923, 1926, and 1928–1929.

== See also ==
- List of Major League Baseball players who played in four decades
