= Scranton Miners (baseball) =

- (1886-1888, 1892-1900, 1907-1917, 1923-1937, 1939-1953); Scranton, Pennsylvania

Minor league affiliations
- Previous classes: Class A (1895–1899, 1933–1953); Class B (1892, 1904–1932)
- Previous leagues: Eastern League (aka New York Penn League before 1937) (1923–1953); New York State League (1904–1917); Atlantic League (1899–1900); Eastern League (1887, 1894–1897); Pennsylvania State League (1886–1887, 1892–1894); Central League (1888)

Major league affiliations
- Previous teams: Washington Senators (1953); St. Louis Browns (1952); Boston Red Sox (1939–1951); Boston Braves (1937); Pittsburgh Pirates (1936)

Minor league titles
- League titles (9): 1906; 1908; 1927; 1936; 1939; 1942; 1946; 1948; 1951

Team data
- Previous names: Scranton Red Sox (1939–1951); Scranton Coal Heavers (1895); Scranton Indians (1886–1887, 1892–1894)
- Previous parks: 1894-1939 - Brooks Athletic Field (Sweeney's Field-1935); 1932-1939 - Crystal Gardens Stadium @ Dickson City *Sundays Only; 1940-1954 - Scranton Dunmore Stadium

The Scranton Miners was the name of several minor league baseball clubs that existed in Scranton, Pennsylvania, between 1886 and 1953.

The first Scranton Miners played in 1886 as the Scranton Indians a member of the Pennsylvania State League. The team played as the Miners in 1887, before jumping to the International League and playing as the Indians for the remainder of the season. In 1892, the name was revived again by a team in the Pennsylvania State League and until 1894. In 1895, the team played as the Scranton Coal Heavers. The third Scranton Miners team played in the Eastern League in 1896 and 1897. The Miners name was used again from 1899–1900 in the Atlantic League. The final incarnation of the Scranton team used the Miners' moniker from 1904–1953. The only exceptions were the years 1939–1943 and 1946–1951, when the team was known as the Scranton Red Sox. The 1946 Red Sox were recognized as one of the 100 greatest minor league teams of all time.

== Season-by-season ==
Year	League	Record	Finish	Manager	Playoffs
1886	Penn. State League	34-44	4th	Dan O'Leary / Harry Fisher	
1887	Penn. State League	11-10	NA	Harry Fisher / John Fogarty	Played the remainder of season as the Scranton Indians in the Eastern League
1887	Eastern League	19-55	NA	Denny Mack / Chris Meisel / Fergy Malone	Played first half of the season in the Penn. State League as the Miners
1888	Central League	55-51	4th	Sam Crane	No playoffs
1892	Penn. State League	2-22	NA	Larry Ketrick	
1893	Penn. State League	45-57	7th	Martin Swift	
1894	Penn. State League	45-28	5th (tied)	Martin Swift / George Goetz	Team jumped to Eastern League and was replaced by Shenandoah Huns on August 2
1894	Eastern League	8-31	7th	Tom Cahill / Martin Swift	Team moved from Pennsylvania State League to replace the Troy Washerwomen on July 26
1895	Eastern League	44-72	6th	Billy Barnie	
1896	Eastern League	44-67	8th	Michael McDermott / Sandy Griffin	
1897	Eastern League	53-60	6th	Sandy Griffin	
1899	Atlantic League	25-38	--	Marty Swift	Team disbanded on July 9
1900	Atlantic League	26-7	1st	Walt Burnham	League disbanded on June 12
1904	NY. State League	27-36	7th	Ben Ellis / Lou O'Neal / Tom Bannon	Team relocated from Schenectady on July 17
1905	NY. State League	56-67	6th	Jim Garry / Edward Ashenbach	No playoffs
1906	NY. State League	82-48	1st	Edward Ashenbach	League Champs; No playoffs
1907	NY. State League	81-54	2nd	Henry Ramsey	No playoffs
1908	NY. State League	84-51	1st	Malachi Kittridge	League Champs; No playoffs
1909	NY. State League	55-81	8th	August Zeimer	No playoffs
1910	NY. State League	72-66	4th	Monte Cross	No playoffs
1911	NY. State League	63-74	7th	Monte Cross	No playoffs
1912	NY. State League	62-69	5th	John Freeman	No playoffs
1913	NY. State League	49-91	8th	Richard Smith / Bob Peterson / John Kelly	No playoffs
1914	NY. State League	42-94	8th	John Kelly / Bill Coughlin	No playoffs
1915	NY. State League	68-55	4th	Bill Coughlin	No playoffs
1916	NY. State League	67-52	2nd	Bill Coughlin	No playoffs
1917	NY. State League	38-84	6th	Bill Coughlin / Jack Connors	No playoffs
1923	NY.-Penn. League	68-54	3rd	Joe Ward	No playoffs
1924	NY.-Penn. League	72-61	3rd	Jack Egan	No playoffs
1925	NY.-Penn. League	64-69	5th	Jack Egan	
1926	NY.-Penn. League	84-50	1st	Jack Egan	League Champs; No playoffs
1927	NY.-Penn. League	61-72	5th	Gus Getz	No playoffs
1928	NY.-Penn. League	58-77	7th	Gus Getz	No playoffs
1929	NY.-Penn. League	64-75	6th	Mike O'Neill	No playoffs
1930	NY.-Penn. League	62-76	8th	Buck Elliott	No playoffs
1931	NY.-Penn. League	69-70	6th	Buck Elliott / Ernie Vick	No playoffs
1932	NY.-Penn. League	72-68	4th	Bill Clymer (30-41) / Bob Shawkey (41-27)	No playoffs
1933	NY.-Penn. League	64-70	5th	Bob Shawkey	No playoffs
1934	NY.-Penn. League	71-67	4th	Jake Pitler	
1935	NY.-Penn. League	81-54	1st	Joe Shaute	Lost League Finals
1936	NY.-Penn. League	78-60	2nd	Elmer Yoter	League Champs
1937	NY.-Penn. League	63-75	6th	Bob Coleman	
1939	Eastern League	80-60	1st	Nemo Leibold	League Champs
1940	Eastern League	79-60	1st	Nemo Leibold	Lost in 1st round
1941	Eastern League	71-68	4th	Nemo Leibold	Lost in 1st round
1942	Eastern League	83-57	2nd	Nemo Leibold	League Champs
1943	Eastern League	87-51	1st	Nemo Leibold	Lost League Finals
1944	Eastern League	56-83	7th	Heinie Manush	
1945	Eastern League	67-69	5th	Elmer Yoter	
1946	Eastern League	96-43	1st	Elmer Yoter	League Champs
1947	Eastern League	78-62	4th	Eddie Popowski	Lost in 1st round
1948	Eastern League	89-51	1st	Mike Ryba	League Champs
1949	Eastern League	79-61	2nd	Mike Ryba (14-16) / Jack Burns (65-45)	Lost in 1st round
1950	Eastern League	54-85	8th	Jack Burns	
1951	Eastern League	77-60	2nd	Jack Burns	League Champs
1952	Eastern League	66-73	6th	Zack Taylor	
1953	Eastern League	51-100	8th	Smut Aderholt	

== Baseball parks ==
From 1894 until 1939, the Scranton Miners played at various iterations of "Brooks Athletic Field" which also was known as "Brooks Field", "Athletic Field", and in 1935 as "Sweeney's Field" after James T. Sweeney bought the property. The ballpark was located on Providence Road in Scranton and also was utilized by the St. Thomas College of Scranton Football team.

In 1932 the team began playing their Sunday games at Crystal Gardens Stadium in Dickson City due to Blue Laws banning games from being played on the Sabbath. According to the May 17th 1932 article in the Hazleton Plain Speaker, Centerfield at the new Crystal Gardens Stadium was so large (788 feet) that anyone who could hit a home run out of the new ballpark would "inherit the new stadium". The Left Field fence was 315 feet. Right Field was 416 feet.

In 1940 a baseball stadium called "Scranton Stadium" aka "Scranton Dunmore Stadium" was built for the "Scranton Red Sox" who were often interchangeable with the "Scranton Miners" with the name going back and forth between the two from 1939 until 1954. It was located at 1350 Monroe Avenue in Dunmore Pennsylvania. The stadium found a second life. It was shipped to Richmond, Virginia and remained a minor league stadium for many more decades.
