= Binghamton Bingos =

American professional baseball team

- (1882, 1899); Binghamton, New York

Minor league affiliations
- Previous classes: Unclassified (1892); Class C (1899)
- Previous leagues: Eastern League (1892); New York State League (1899)

The Binghamton Bingos were an American professional baseball team that played in Binghamton, New York, during the 1892 and 1899 seasons.

The Bingos first competed in 1892, as early members of the Eastern League, which later became known as the International League. The team returned for the 1899 season, playing at the Class C level in the New York State League within Minor League Baseball, posting a record of 56–55 (.505).
