= Joe McCarthy (catcher) =

American baseball player (1881–1937)

- Catcher
- Born: December 25, 1881; Syracuse, New York, U.S.
- Died: January 12, 1937 (aged 55); Syracuse, New York, U.S.
- Batted: Right Threw: Right

MLB debut
- September 27, 1905, for the New York Highlanders

Last MLB appearance
- July 8, 1906, for the St. Louis Cardinals

MLB statistics
- Batting average: .231
- Home runs: 0
- Runs batted in: 2
- Stats at Baseball Reference

Teams
- New York Highlanders (1905); St. Louis Cardinals (1906)

Joseph Nicodemus McCarthy (December 25, 1881 – January 12, 1937) was an American Major League Baseball catcher. McCarthy played for the New York Highlanders in 1905 and the St. Louis Cardinals in 1906. In 16 career games, he had 9 hits in 39 at-bats. He batted and threw right-handed.

McCarthy was born in Syracuse, New York, where he died at a hospital after a long illness.
