= Bill Kay (baseball) =

American baseball player (1878-1945)

- Outfielder
- Born: February 14, 1878; New Castle, Virginia, U.S.
- Died: December 3, 1945 (aged 67); Roanoke, Virginia, U.S.
- Batted: Left Threw: Right

MLB debut
- August 12, 1907, for the Washington Senators

Last MLB appearance
- October 5, 1907, for the Washington Senators

MLB statistics
- Batting average: .333
- Home runs: 0
- Runs batted in: 7
- Stats at Baseball Reference

Teams
- Washington Senators (1907)

Walter Brocton "Bill" Kay (February 14, 1878 – December 3, 1945) was an American outfielder in Major League Baseball. Nicknamed "King Bill", he played for the Washington Senators in 1907.
