= Charlie Loudenslager =

American baseball player (1881-1933)

- Second baseman
- Born: May 21, 1881; Baltimore, Maryland
- Died: October 31, 1933 (aged 52); Baltimore, Maryland
- Batted: Unknown Threw: Right

MLB debut
- April 15, 1904, for the Brooklyn Superbas

Last MLB appearance
- April 15, 1904, for the Brooklyn Superbas

MLB statistics
- Games played: 1
- At bats: 2
- Hits: 0
- Stats at Baseball Reference

Teams
- Brooklyn Superbas (1904)

Charles Edward Loudenslager (May 21, 1881 – October 31, 1933) was second baseman in Major League Baseball who played in one game for the 1904 Brooklyn Superbas. He stood at 5 feet 9 inches (1.75 m) and weighed 186 pounds (84 kg).

== Career ==
Loudenslager was born in Baltimore, Maryland. He started his minor league baseball career in 1902 with the New York State League's Syracuse Stars. The following season, he won the NYSL batting title with a .327 average and also topped the circuit with 167 hits.

Loudenslager made the major leagues in early 1904 with the Brooklyn Superbas. He played in one game for them, on April 15, and went hitless in two at bats. He then played for Syracuse and the Eastern League's Baltimore Orioles for the rest of the season.

After spending 1905 in Baltimore, Loudenslager played for the Rochester Bronchos for three seasons and then for the Newark Indians for two. He batted just .194 in 1910 and subsequently went back down to the Class B New York State League.

From 1911 to 1917, Loudenslager was the second baseman for the Elmira Colonels. His batting average was .269 in his first season there, and he raised it to .316 in 1912. It was only the second time that he had achieved a .300+ average; he finished third in the league batting race and led all players with 166 hits.

Loudenslager hit over .300 twice more, in 1915 and 1917. He then played in the International League for two years before retiring from professional baseball.

Loudenslager died in Baltimore in 1933. He was buried in Loudon Park Cemetery.
