= Pussy Tebeau =

American baseball player (1870–1950)

- Outfielder
- Born: February 22, 1870; Worcester, Massachusetts, U.S.
- Died: March 25, 1950 (aged 80); Pittsfield, Massachusetts, U.S.
- Batted: Right Threw: Right

MLB debut
- July 22, 1895, for the Cleveland Spiders

Last MLB appearance
- July 23, 1895, for the Cleveland Spiders

MLB statistics
- Games played: 2
- At bats: 6
- Hits: 3
- Stats at Baseball Reference

Teams
- Cleveland Spiders (1895)

Charles Alston "Pussy" Tebeau (February 22, 1870 – March 25, 1950) was an American right fielder in Major League Baseball who played briefly for the Cleveland Spiders during the 1895 season. Tebeau batted and threw right-handed. He was born in Worcester, Massachusetts.

Some report that he is the younger brother of George and Patsy Tebeau who also played in the major leagues, but that is unlikely. George and Patsy grew up in St. Louis while Charles was born and raised in Massachusetts.

Tebeau's major league career only lasted two games in July 1895 because he had already signed with the Portland club in the New England League but failed to report. The Cleveland Spiders picked up and used Tebeau without knowledge of this. Portland's manager Frank Leonard saw his name in the newspaper (referred to as C.A. Tebeau) with Cleveland and filed a complaint. Before signing with Portland, Tebeau played for Lowell in the New England Association.

In a two-game career, Tebeau was a .500 hitter (3-for-6) with three runs, one RBI, and one stolen base without home runs.

Tebeau died in Pittsfield, Massachusetts at the age of 80.
