= Myron Allen =

American baseball player (1854–1924)

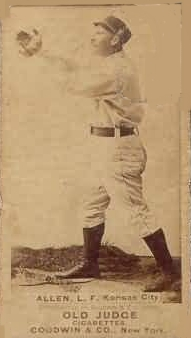
- Outfielder
- Born: March 22, 1854; Kingston, New York, U.S.
- Died: March 8, 1924 (aged 69); Kingston, New York, U.S.
- Batted: Right Threw: Right

MLB debut
- July 19, 1883, for the New York Gothams

Last MLB appearance
- July 1, 1888, for the Kansas City Cowboys

MLB statistics
- Batting average: .259
- Hits: 157
- Triples: 14
- Stats at Baseball Reference

Teams
- New York Gothams (1883); Boston Beaneaters (1886); Cleveland Blues (AA) (1887); Kansas City Cowboys (AA) (1888)

Myron Smith Allen (March 22, 1854 – March 8, 1924), nicknamed "Zeke", was an American Major League Baseball outfielder who played for four seasons. He played for the New York Gothams in 1883, the Boston Beaneaters in 1886, the Cleveland Blues in 1887, and the Kansas City Cowboys in 1888.
