= Tim Shinnick =

American baseball player (1867–1944)

- Second baseman
- Born: November 6, 1867; Exeter, New Hampshire, U.S.
- Died: May 18, 1944 (aged 76); Exeter, New Hampshire, U.S.
- Batted: Both Threw: Right

MLB debut
- April 19, 1890, for the Louisville Colonels

Last MLB appearance
- October 4, 1891, for the Louisville Colonels

MLB statistics
- Batting average: .239
- Home runs: 2
- Runs batted in: 134
- Stats at Baseball Reference

Teams
- Louisville Colonels (1890–1891)

Timothy James "Good-Eye" Shinnick (November 6, 1867 – May 18, 1944) was an American Major League Baseball second baseman from 1890 to 1891. He played for the Louisville Colonels.

Shinnick was one of the few professional baseball players of his era to attend college. He attended Phillips Exeter Academy in his hometown of Exeter, New Hampshire. He was the star player for his college team. He became a professional player in 1887, and gained a degree of notoriety by the fact that every team for which he played (including his college team) always won its league championship.

In the spring of 1890 he made his major league debut with the Louisville Colonels. The Colonels had finished in last place the previous season, but the 1890 Louisville Colonels season was historic, as they won the American Association pennant. In the process, the Colonels became the first team in major league history to go from last place to first place in the span of a single season. The club's remarkable achievement is extensively documented in a 2026 book, The 1890 Louisville Cyclones, written by Perry T. Cooper and published by McFarland & Company, Publishers.

Tim Shinnick is prominently featured in this book. In the first game of his major league career he hit a walk-off double to win the game, and from that point on he played in all of Louisville's 1890 games. He helped the team win its unexpected pennant, but the club was unable to continue its winning ways the following season, with the result that Shinnick's personal championship streak came to an end. Shinnick doesn't appear to have handled it well; in September 1891 he got into a quarrel with a teammate, Jack Ryan, and slashed him across the knee with a knife. The wound required surgery. Shinnick's career in the major leagues ended less than a month later.

After his two seasons in the American Association, Shinnick played in the minor leagues until 1901. He spent the remainder of his life in his hometown, Exeter.
