= Binghamton Bingoes =

American professional baseball team

- (1885, 1893–1894, 1901–1919); Binghamton, New York

Minor league affiliations
- Previous classes: Unclassified (1885, 1893–1894); Class C (1901); Class B (1902–1917); Class AA (1918–1919)
- Previous leagues: New York State League (1885); Eastern League (1893–1894); New York State League (1901–1917); International League (1918–1919)

The Binghamton Bingoes were an American professional baseball team that played in Binghamton, New York, during 1885, 1893–1894, and 1901–1919.

The Bingoes first played in 1885, within the New York State League (NYSL). They next played during the 1893 and 1894 seasons, as early members of the Eastern League, which later became known as the International League. The Bingoes again returned in 1901, classified by Minor League Baseball as a Class C team within the NYSL. From 1902 to 1917, they remained in the NYSL, competing at the Class B level. In the team's final two seasons of 1918 and 1919, the team competed at the Double-A level as members of the International League.
