= Troy Trojans (minor league baseball) =

- 1885–1916; (1885-1886, 1888, 1891-1895, 1899-1916); Troy, New York

Minor league affiliations
- Previous classes: Class B (1902-1916); Class C (1899-1901); Class B (1895); Class A (1891)
- League: New York State League (1902-1916)
- Previous leagues: Eastern League (1892-1894); Eastern Association (1891); New York State League (1890); International Association (1888); Hudson River League (1885-1886)

Minor league titles
- League titles: 1890

Team data
- Previous names: Troy Trojans (1901-1916); Troy Washerwomen (1900-1901); Troy Trojans (1895, 1899); Troy Washerwomen (1894); Troy Trojans (1886-1888, 1890-1893); Troy Baseball Club (1885)
- Previous parks: Troy Ball Club Grounds (1885-1896)

The Troy Trojans, based in Troy, New York, were a minor league baseball team that existed on and off between 1885 and 1916. They first appeared in the Hudson River League in 1885 and 1886. After a year off they resurfaced in the International Association in 1888. They played in the Eastern Association in 1891, and in the Eastern League from 1892 to 1894, when they were replaced by the Scranton Indians. They joined the New York State League in 1899, replacing the Auburn Maroons and were in the league through 1916, when they were replaced by the Harrisburg Islanders.

The great Johnny Evers began his professional career with the Trojans in 1902 before moving to the Chicago Cubs later that year.}
