= Abel Lizotte =

American baseball player (1870–1926)

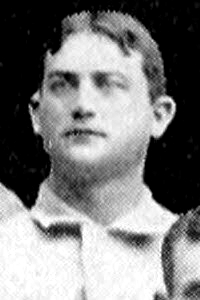
- First baseman
- Born: April 13, 1870; Lewiston, Maine
- Died: December 4, 1926 (aged 56); Wilkes-Barre, Pennsylvania
- Batted: Unknown Threw: Unknown

MLB debut
- September 17, 1896, for the Pittsburgh Pirates

Last MLB appearance
- September 26, 1896, for the Pittsburgh Pirates

MLB statistics
- Batting average: .103
- Home runs: 0
- Runs batted in: 3
- Stats at Baseball Reference

Teams
- Pittsburgh Pirates (1896)

Abel Lizotte (April 13, 1870 – December 4, 1926) was a Major League Baseball first baseman who played for the Pittsburgh Pirates in 1896.

He made his major league debut on September 17, 1896, and he played in his final game on September 26 of that year. In seven big league games, he hit .103 with three runs scored and three RBI. He collected three hits in 29 at bats.

Lizotte also spent 10 seasons in the minor leagues, hitting .292 in 1,023 games. In 1895, with the Wilkes-Barre Coal Barons, Lizotte hit .333 with 111 runs and 29 triples in 109 games. In 1901, with the Wheeling Stogies, Lizotte hit .330 in 127 games. In 1907 and 1908, he managed the minor league Wilkes-Barre Barons.

He was interred at St. Mary Cemetery in Wilkes-Barre following his death.
