= Utica Pent-Ups =

Baseball team based in Utica, New York

Information
- Location: Utica, New York
- Founded: 1878
- Folded: 1917
- Nickname: Pent-Ups (also Pentups)
- League championships: 3 (1886, 1900, 1912)
- Former name: Utica Braves (1889); Utica Reds (1900); Utica Utes (1910–1917)
- Former leagues: International Association (1878, 1886–1887); National Association (1879); New York State League (1885, 1889–1890, 1898–1917)

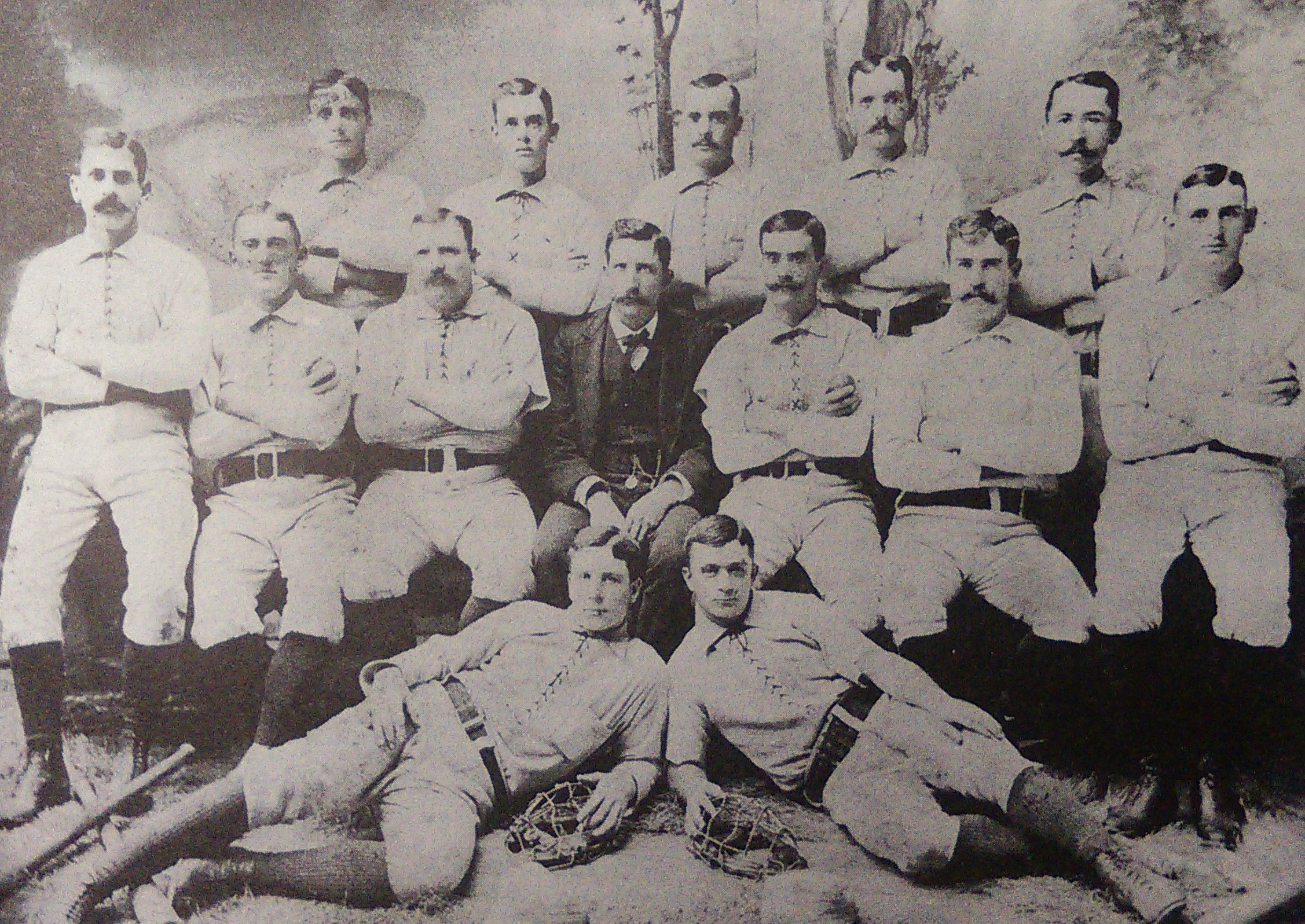
1886 Utica Pent-Ups, champions of the International League

The Utica Pent-Ups (alternately, the Pentups) were a professional baseball team based in Utica, New York, that played in the International Association for the 1878 season, the National Association in 1879, and different incarnations of the New York State League.

== Team History ==
=== 1878-1879 ===
Utica's first season was in the 1878 season of the International Association. They played the 1879 season in the National Association, and adopted the Pent-Ups moniker that year. Documentation on these teams is scarce, but Baseball-Reference data says that at least seventeen players from these teams would play in the major leagues at some point in their career (seven players from the 1878 team, eight from the 1879, and two on both).

=== 1885-1887 ===
The Pent-Ups returned in 1885, joining the first incarnation of the New York State League. They finished in second place, three games behind the Syracuse Stars. Ahead of the 1886 season, the five teams in the NYSL joined with a team from the National League and two new Canadian teams, forming the International Association.

In 1886, the Pentups won the International Association championship with a season record of 62-34, winning the pennant by 5.5 games over the Rochester Maroons. The 1887 season did not go as well. After starting the season 12-39, the team moved mid-season to Wilkes-Barre and were renamed to the Coal Barons. They finished the season tied for last place with a .257 winning percentage (the Oswego Starchboxes had a lower percentage, but they folded early in the season).

=== 1889-1890 ===
After the Pent-Ups' move to Wilkes-Barre, Utica was without a baseball team for a year and a half. In 1889, the Pent-Ups returned to the second incarnation of the New York State League. They were also known as the Utica Braves during this season. They once again finished in last place of the teams that played the whole season. They played the 1890 season in the NYSL as well, but documentation of that season is sparse. The team disappeared again after the 1890 season, as did the league.

=== 1898-1917 ===
The Pent-Ups and the New York State League returned in 1898. This time both the team and the league were more stable, and Utica fielded at team in the NYSL every year between 1898 and 1917, when professional baseball was destabilized by the United States' involvement in World War I.

The Pent-Ups found some success in this time period. They won the 1900 and 1912 pennants, and usually had winning records. The team went through a few name changes, playing the 1900 season with an alternate name as the Utica Reds, and permanently adopted the team name of the Utica Utes from 1910 until they folded in 1917.

== Legacy ==
Many major-league baseball players played for the Pent-Ups, including Utica-born outfielder George Burns, who won a World Series with the New York Giants in 1921. He played with Utica for three seasons (1909-1911).
