= Mike Donovan (baseball) =

American baseball player (1881-1938)

- Third baseman
- Born: October 18, 1881; Brooklyn, New York, U.S.
- Died: February 3, 1938 (aged 56); New York, New York, U.S.
- Batted: Right Threw: Right

MLB debut
- May 29, 1904, for the Cleveland Naps

Last MLB appearance
- October 8, 1908, for the New York Highlanders

MLB statistics
- Batting average: .235
- Home runs: 0
- Runs batted in: 2
- Stats at Baseball Reference

Teams
- Cleveland Naps (1904); New York Highlanders (1908)

Michael Beckam Donovan (October 18, 1881 – February 3, 1938) was an American professional baseball player. He played parts of two seasons in Major League Baseball for the Cleveland Naps in 1904 and the New York Highlanders in 1908, primarily as a third baseman. In seven career games, he had five hits and two RBIs, all of them with the Highlanders. He batted and threw right-handed.

Donovan was born in Brooklyn, New York and died in New York, New York. Donovan was working for Consolidated Edison as a security guard when he was accidentally shot and died, after a co-worker's gun accidentally discharged.
