= Albany Senators =

- 1885–1959; Albany, New York

Minor league affiliations
- Previous classes: Class A (1920–1932; 1937–1959); Class AA (1932–1936); Class B (1902–1916); Class C (1900–1901)
- League: Eastern League (1938–1959); New York–Pennsylvania League (1937); International League (1932–1936); Eastern League (1916–1932) (1920–1932); Eastern League (1884–1912) (1892–1893; 1896); Eastern Association (1891); International Association (1888); Hudson River League (1886); New York State League (1885; 1890; 1894–1895; 1899–1916)

Major league affiliations
- Previous teams: Kansas City Athletics (1958–1959); Boston Red Sox (1952–1954; 1956–1957); Unaffiliated (1932–1936; 1951; 1955); Pittsburgh Pirates (1940–1950); Cincinnati Reds (1937–1939); New York Yankees (1931)

Minor league titles
- League titles: (20th century) 1954; 1945; 1929; 1907; 1902

Team data
- Previous parks: Hawkins Stadium

The Albany Senators was a name used by multiple minor league baseball teams representing Albany, New York, that existed between 1885 and 1959. The mid-20th century club played at Hawkins Stadium.

The various editions of the Senators generally played in higher-classification leagues such as the New York State League, the Eastern League that played between 1916 and 1932, the International League, the 1923–37 New York–Pennsylvania League, and the modern Eastern League, in which it played 22 consecutive seasons, 1938–59, before the team disbanded. An early Senators team also played in "outlaw" minor leagues such as the Hudson River League during the 19th century in between stints in "organized baseball."

The Senators won six league championships over their organized baseball history, the last in 1954. The club was a powerhouse during the 1940s as a Class A farm team of the Pittsburgh Pirates, posting winning records between 1942 and 1948, making the Eastern League playoffs six times, leading in attendance five times, and taking the 1945 EL championship. Among the Pittsburgh farmhands who played for the club was Hall of Famer Ralph Kiner, in 1941–42.

Over the years, different Senators teams also were affiliated with MLB clubs such as the New York Yankees, Washington Senators, Cincinnati Reds, Boston Red Sox and Kansas City Athletics. The last-place 1959 Senators — the latest in a succession of poor clubs — drew only 45,000 fans for the season and Albany was dropped from the Eastern League when it contracted from eight to six teams for 1960. Professional baseball and the EL would not return to New York's state capital until 1983, when the West Haven A's moved to the area as the Albany-Colonie A's (now the Richmond Flying Squirrels). The current pro baseball team in the Albany area is the Tri-City ValleyCats of the Frontier League.

The International League Senators became the Jersey City Giants in 1937.

== Notable alumni ==
- Gus Bell
- Al Benton
- Como Cotelle
- Al Gionfriddo
- Pumpsie Green
- Stan Hack
- Ralph Kiner
- George McQuinn
- Bill Monbouquette
- Johnny Murphy
- Bobo Newsom
- Albie Pearson
- Alabama Pitts
- Jake Powell
- Red Rolfe
- Lloyd Russell
- Al Silvera
- Mose Solomon, the "Rabbi of Swat"
- Frank Sullivan
- Billy Werber
- Earl Wilson
- Taft Wright
- John Wyatt
