= Cortland Wagonmakers =

- 1897–1905; (1897–1901, 1905); Cortland, New York

Minor league affiliations
- Class: Class C (1897–1901); Independent (1905)
- League: New York State League (1897–1901); Empire State League (1905)

Major league affiliations
- Team: None

Minor league titles
- League titles (0): None

Team data
- Name: Cortland Hirelings (1897); Cortland Wagonmakers (1898–1901); Cortland (1905)
- Ballpark: Unknown

The Cortland Wagonmakers were a minor league baseball team based in Cortland, New York. Between 1897 and 1905, Cortland teams played as members of the New York State League from 1897 to 1901 and the Empire State League in 1905. The 1897 team was known as the Cortland "Hirelings."

== History ==
Cortland first began minor league baseball play in 1897, when the Cortland Hirelings became charter members of the Class C level New York State League. The Cortland franchise joined the league on June 2, 1897, after the season had already begun. Cortland completed the season and had a 29–36 record with a winning percentage that placed fifth in the league standings. The team was managed by George Geer and Otis Smith as the Hirelings finished behind the first place Canandaigua Rustlers

The Cortland Wagonmakers continued play in the 1898 the New York State League as the league became an eight-team league. The Wagonmakers finished in fifth place with a record of 45–49. Thomas McGuirk, Ed Delaney and Frank Leonard managed the team in 1898, as the Wagonmakers finished 8.5 games behind the first place Canandaigua Rustlers.

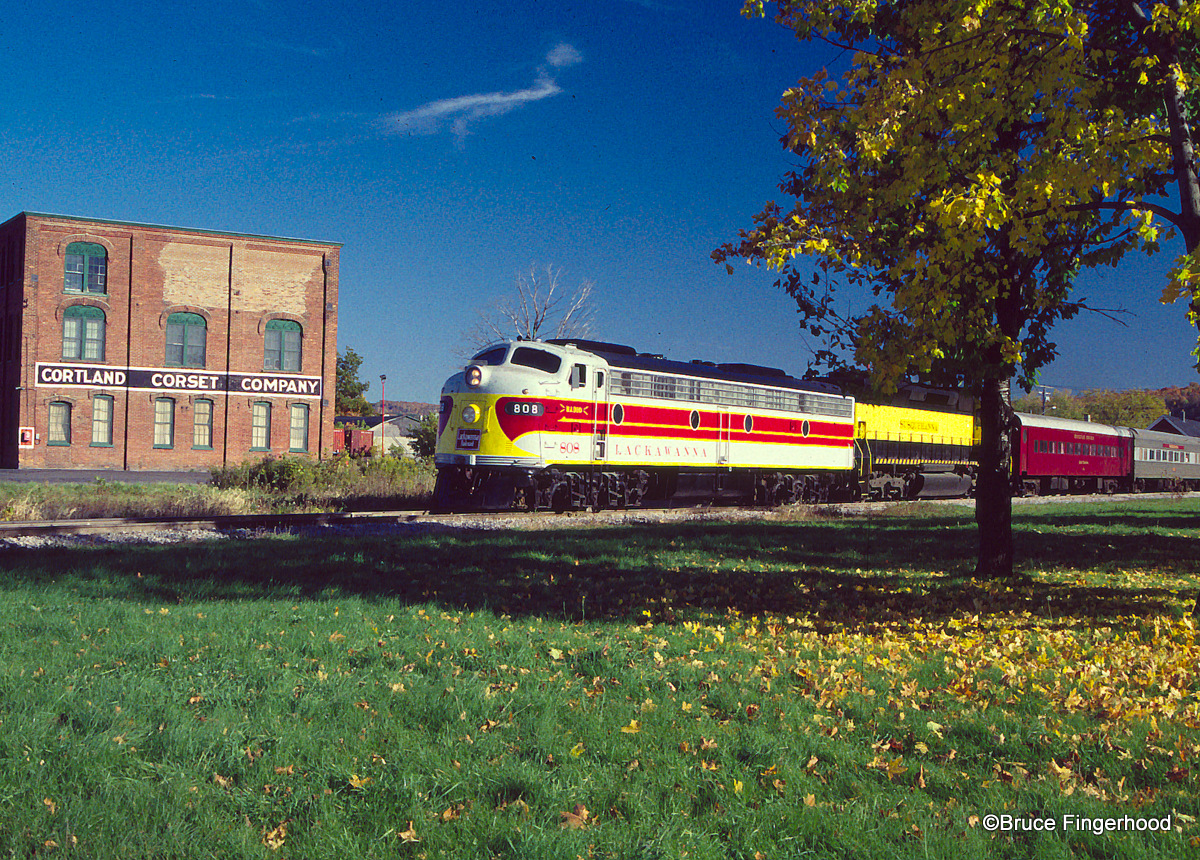
(1994) Former Cortland Wagon Company building built in 1872. Cortland, New York.

The Cortland use of the "Wagonmakers" moniker corresponds to local industry in Cortland, New York in the era. The city was home to numerous carriage and wagon manufacturers in the era, including the Brockway Carriage Works.

Finishing above .500 for the first time in 1899, the Cortland Wagonmakers placed third in the eight–team New York State League. Finishing with a 56–46 record, the Wagonmakers were managed by Henry Ramsey. Cortland finished 17.0 games behind the first place Rome Romans in the final standings, as the league did not hold playoffs for its duration.

Cortland improved to place in second place in 1900. Managed by J.D. Roche, the Wagonmakers had a 70–43 record in the New York State League final standings. Cortland finished 2.0 games behind the first place Utica Reds.

The Cortland franchise relocated in 1901. On July 11, 1901, the Cortland Wagonmakers had a 22–34 record when the franchise moved to Waverly, New York. Completing the season as the Waverly Wagonmakers, the team had an overall record of 36–68, placing seventh in the New York State League under managers William A. Smith and M.T. Roche.

After a three-season hiatus, the 1905 Cortland team resumed minor league play. Cortland joined the Independent level Empire State League for the 1905 season. The franchise folded from the league on July 18, 1905. The Cortland record and standing from 1905 are unknown. Cortland has not hosted another minor league baseball team.

In 2008, a vintage baseball game was held honoring the Cortland Wagonmakers. The team honoring the Cortland Wagonmakers played against a team from Truxton, honoring the Truxton Giants. The teams played a double header using rules from the era.

== The ballpark ==
The name of the Cortland minor league home ballpark(s) is not known.

== Timeline ==
Year(s)	# Yrs.	Team	Level	League
1897	1	Cortland Hirelings	Class C	New York State League
1898–1901	4	Cortland Wagonmakers	Class C	New York State League
1905	1	Cortland	Independent	Empire State League

== Year–by–year records ==
Year	Record	Finish	Manager	Playoffs/Notes
1897	29–36	5th	George Geer / Otis Smith	Entered league June 2
1898	45–49	5th	Thomas McGuirk / Ed Delaney / Frank Leonard	No playoffs held
1899	56–46	3rd	Henry Ramsey	No playoffs held
1900	70–43	2nd	J.D. Roche	No playoffs held
1901	36–68	7th	William A. Smith / M.T Roche	Moved to Waverly July 11
1905	NA	NA	NA	Team folded July 18

== Notable alumni ==
- Larry Battam (1898)
- Elmer Bliss (1901)
- Buttons Briggs (1899)
- Matt Broderick (1901)
- Tun Berger (1897)
- Wid Conroy (1899)
- Dan Coogan (1900–1901)
- Fred Donovan (1901)
- Mal Eason (1900)
- Frank Foutz (1898)
- Bill Friel (1897–1898)
- Billy Gannon (1899–1901)
- Billy Ging (1901)
- Ed Householder (1898)
- Jim Jones (1898)
- Fred Ketchum (1897–1899)
- Frank LaPorte (1898)
- Jim McCormick (1900–1901)
- Sandy McDougal (1901)
- Sam McMackin (1898)
- Kohly Miller (1898)
- Carlton Molesworth (1898, 1901)
- Pat Moran (1898)
- Jack O'Neill (1897)
- Pete O'Brien (1900–1901)
- Mark Polhemus (1898)
- Bobby Rothermel (1899)
- Danny Shay (1898)
- Bucky Veil (1900)
- Joe Wall (1901)
- Stan Yerkes (1897–1898)

== See also ==
- Cortland Wagonmakers players
- Cortland Hirelings players
- Cortland (minor league baseball) players
