= Rome Colonels =

- 1898–1951; (1898–1901, 1905, 1937–1942, 1946–1951); Rome, New York

Minor league affiliations
- Class: Independent (1898); Class C (1899–1901); Independent (1905); Class C (1937–1942, 1946–1951)
- League: New York State League (1898–1901); Empire State League (1905); Canadian–American League (1937–1942, 1946–1951)

Major league affiliations
- Team: Philadelphia Phillies (1942); Detroit Tigers (1946–1949); Philadelphia Athletics (1951)

Minor league titles
- League titles (2): 1899; 1939
- Conference titles (1): 1948

Team data
- Name: Rome Romans (1898–1901); Rome (1905); Rome Colonels (1937–1942, 1946–1951)
- Ballpark: Riverside Park (1898–1901, 1905); League Park (1937); Colonels Park (1938–1942, 1946–1951)

The Rome Colonels was the primary moniker of minor league baseball teams based in Rome, New York between 1898 and 1951. Rome teams played as members of the New York State League (1898–1901), Empire State League (1905) and Canadian–American League (1937–1942, 1946–1951). The Colonels were preceded in Rome by the Rome Romans.

The Rome Colonels played as a minor league affiliate of the Philadelphia Phillies in 1942, Detroit Tigers from 1946 to 1949 and Philadelphia Athletics in 1951.

== History ==
=== New York State League (1898–1901) ===
Minor league baseball started in Rome, New York in 1898. Playing at Riverside Park, when the Rome Romans joined the Independent eight–team New York State League. The Rome "Romans" finished their initial season with a 43–51 record, placing sixth in the New York State League. The Rome managers were Charles Faatz and Hobe Whiting.

The 1899 Rome Romans were the New York State League champions. The New York State League became a Class C level League in 1899 and Rome finished with a record of 76–32, to place first in the New York State League final standings, as the league held no playoffs. The 1899 league champion Rome Romans were managed by Tom O'Brien and finished 8.5 games ahead of the second place Utica Pent–Ups in the eight–team league.

In 1900, the Rome Romans placed third, continuing play as members of the New York State League. Rome had a 1900 regular season record of 70–44 under manager Tom O'Brien.

The Romans played their final season on the New York State League in 1901. The Rome Romans finished their final season 62–47, placing fourth in the New York State League, playing the season under manager George Wheeler. The Rome franchise folded from the New York State League after the 1901 season.

=== Empire State League (1905) ===
After a three-season absence, minor league baseball returned to Rome in 1905. In 1905, Rome hosted a franchise in the Independent Empire State League, playing at Riverside Park. Rome finished with a record of 41–30, placing third in the eight–team Empire State League. Rome folded after the 1905 season.

=== Canadian–American League (1937–1942) ===
In 1937, the Rome Colonels franchise was formed. The Rome Colonels were founded and owned by local surgeon Dr. Dan Mellen, who would own the team through the 1949 season. The 1937 Colonels began play in the Class C level Canadian–American League, as the league expanded from six teams to eight teams in its second season. The Rome Colonels would have a fourteen-year affiliation with the Canadian–American League. Their home ballpark in 1937 was League Park. The Rome Colonels finished their first season with a 40–59 record, placing 6th in the Canadian–American League. The Colonels were managed by William Buckley and Joe Brown. Rome had season home attendance of 18,387, an average of 371 at League Park.

For the 1938 season, the Rome Colonels moved home games to the newly built Colonels Park, where the Colonels would play for the rest of their existence. Rome finished the 1938 Canadian–American League regular season in fifth place. Their regular season record was 61–63 under manager William Buckley, missing the playoffs. Home attendance at Colonels Park was 51,363, an average of 828 per contest.

The 1939 Rome Colonels captured the Canadian–American League championship. After finishing the regular season 68–54, placing third in the Canadian–American League, Rome qualified for the playoffs. Led by manager Admiral Martin, Rome began the 1939 Playoffs by sweeping the Cornwall Maple Leafs in four games. In the Finals, Rome faced the Amsterdam Rugmakers, who had won the 1939 Pennant by 12.0 games. Rome defeated Amsterdam 3 games to 2 and captured the championship. Rome had 1939 home attendance of 57,654, an average of 945.

Rome placed seventh in the 1940 Canadian–American League. Under manager Admiral Martin, the Colonels finished with a regular season record of 50–73. Home attendance at Colonels Park in 1940 was 36,395, 592 per contest.

The Rome Colonels qualified for the 1941 Canadian–American League playoffs. Rome finished the 1941 regular season with a 66–58 record, placing third in the league, playing under manager Lee Riley. In the playoffs, the Oneonta Indians defeated Rome 4 games to 2. Colonels Park season attendance was 42,828, an average of 691 per home game.

The 1942 season preceded a hiatus due to World War II. The 1942 Rome Colonels were an affiliate of the Philadelphia Phillies. Rome finished the regular season with a 38–85 record, placing eighth and last in the Canadian–American League. The 1942 managers were John Griffiths and Philip Clark. Continuing play at Colonels Park, the Colonels had 1942 season attendance of 19,819, 322 fans per game.

=== Canadian–American League (1946–1951) ===
Canadian–American League minor league baseball returned in 1946, upon the conclusion of World War II. The Rome Colonels began their tenure as a Detroit Tigers affiliate, continuing play in the Class C level Canadian-American League. Rome qualified for the Playoffs in 1946. After a regular season record of 72–52, Rome placed third in the Canadian–American League, playing under manager Woody Wheaton. In the Playoffs, the Trois Rivieres Royals defeated the Rome Colonels 4 games to 3. Resuming play at Colonels Park, Rome's season Attendance was 58,371, an average of 941.

In 1947, the Rome Colonels placed seventh in Canadian–American League regular season, missing the playoffs. The Colonels finished with a 67–72 record under managers Ed Boland and Adam Bengoechea. Playing as an affiliate of the Detroit Tigers, Rome had a total season attendance of 58,463.

The Rome Colonels continued play as an affiliate of the Detroit Tigers and captured the 1948 Canadian–American League pennant. The Colonels finished with a regular season record of 79–57, to finish first in the Canadian–American League. The Colonels finished the Regular season 2.0 games ahead of the second place Trois Rivieres Royals. Led by Manager Lefty Smoll, the 1948 Playoffs saw the Oneonta Red Sox defeat the Rome Colonels 4 games to 3. Playing at Colonels Park, 1948 season attendance was 75,103, an average of 1,104 per game.

The Rome Colonels played under returning manager Lefty Smoll in 1949. Rome finished eighth and last in the Canadian–American League in their final season as a Detroit Tigers affiliate. Their regular season record was 48–88, with the Colonels finishing 41.0 games behind the first place Quebec Braves. Attendance at Colonels Park was 40,331 in 1949. In late 1949, Colonels founder and owner Dan Mellen sold the franchise to new local owners, the Copper City Sports Enterprises, headed by Isadore Kaplan.

The 1950 Rome Colonels finished sixth in the Class C level Canadian–American League, playing unaffiliated. Playing under three managers, the Rome Colonels finished 51–86, under Managers Bill Gates, William Booker and Emil Gall. The Colonels drew 34,535 fans for the season.

The Canadian–American League folded following the 1951 season. Rome played their final season as an affiliate of the Philadelphia Athletics. Managed by Buck Etchison, the Rome Colonels had a record of 46–71, placing fifth in the Canadian–American League. Season attendance in 1951 was a total of 23,454, averaging 401 in their final season at Colonels Park.

After the 1951 season, Rome, New York has not hosted another minor league baseball team.

== The ballparks ==
Early Rome Romans teams through 1905 hosted minor league home games at Riverside Park. Riverside Park had a capacity 500, with a grandstand that measured 26 feet in width by 83 feet in length. Riverside Park was located at Parkway & Floyd Avenue In Rome, New York.

In 1937, the Rome Colonels played minor league home games at League Park. The ballpark was located in West Rome and was also known as Murray's Park. The franchise made improvements to the ballpark for the 1937 season, before moving to the new Colonels Park in 1938.

Beginning in 1938, Rome minor league teams hosted home games at Colonels Park. The Rome Colonels remained at the ballpark until folding in 1951. Colonels Park had a capacity of 3,500 (1939) and 2,250 (1942), with dimensions of (Left, Center, Right): 360–380–320 (1939). Colonels Park officially opened on May 18, 1938, after Colonels' owner Dr. Dan Mellen had purchased six-and one-half acres and constructed the new park, built with an approximate construction cost $15,000. The park was enclosed with a 7–foot board fence. The ballpark was located on Black River Boulevard between East Locust Street and East Pine Street. Today, the site is still in use as a public park with ballfields, now known as Franklyn's Field.

== Notable alumni ==
- Larry Battam (1898)
- George Blackburn (1898)
- Ed Boland (1947, MGR)
- Charlie Bowles (1946)
- Joe Brown (1937, MGR)
- Dan Coogan (1899)
- Bill Cristall (1898)
- Bill Day (1900)
- Jim Devlin (1899) NL Strikeout Leader
- Jim Duncan (1898)
- Buck Etchison (1951)
- Pete Elko (1950)
- Ben Ellis (1898)
- Jack Fifield (1901)
- Henry Fournier (1898)
- Bill Fox (1898–1900)
- Bill Gilbert (1898)
- John Gochnaur (1898)
- Charlie Hamburg (1901)
- Pat Hannivan (1900)
- Jim Jones (1899–1900)
- Joe Kiefer (1937)
- Bill Kissinger (1898)
- Harry Lumley (1901) NL Home Run Leader
- Lynn Lovenguth (1947–1948)
- Eric MacKenzie (1951)
- Willard Mains (1899–1901)
- John Malarkey (1900)
- Dale Matthewson (1942)
- Jim McGuire (1899–1901)
- Pete O'Brien (1898–1900)
- Tom O'Brien (1900–1901, MGR)
- Fred Odwell (1898)
- Leon Riley (1941, MGR)
- Millard Robinson (1942)
- Emmett Rogers (1898)
- Nap Shea (1899–1901)
- Billy Southworth Jr. (1939)
- Eddie Turchin (1940)
- Cy Vorhees (1898)
- Woody Wheaton (1946)
- George Wheeler (1898–1900), (1901, MGR)
- Hal White (1937–1938)
- Karl Winsch (1942)

== See also ==
- Rome Colonels players
- Category:Rome Romans (New York State League) players
