= Oswego Starchmakers =

- 1905–1907; Oswego, New York

Minor league affiliations
- Class: Independent (1905); Class D (1906–1907)
- League: Empire State League (1905–1907)

Major league affiliations
- Team: None

Minor league titles
- League titles (1): 1907

Team data
- Name: Oswego Starchmakers (1905–1907)
- Ballpark: Richardson Park (1905–1907)

The Oswego Starchmakers were a minor league baseball team based in Oswego, New York. From 1905 to 1907, the Starchmakers played as members of the Class D level Empire State, winning the 1907 league championship. Oswego hosted minor league home games at Richardson Park.

== History ==
After minor league baseball began in 1885 with the Oswego Sweegs of the New York State League, the Oswego Starchmakers were immediately preceded by the 1900 Oswego Grays of the New York State League, who relocated to Elmira during their final season.

On March 22, 1905, the Oswego "Starchmakers" franchise came into existence when Empire State League was formed at a meeting held in Syracuse, New York. G. Campbell represented Oswego at the meeting. During the meeting, the teams were selected for the upcoming season and R.C. Mayor of Rome was elected secretary and treasurer. Salaries were set at $600.00 per month for each league team.

The "Starchmakers" nickname corresponds with local history and the starch production industry. Oswego also hosted the similarly named Oswego Starchboxes minor league team from 1886 to 1888. Oswego has been home to the Kingsford Starch Factory since 1848.

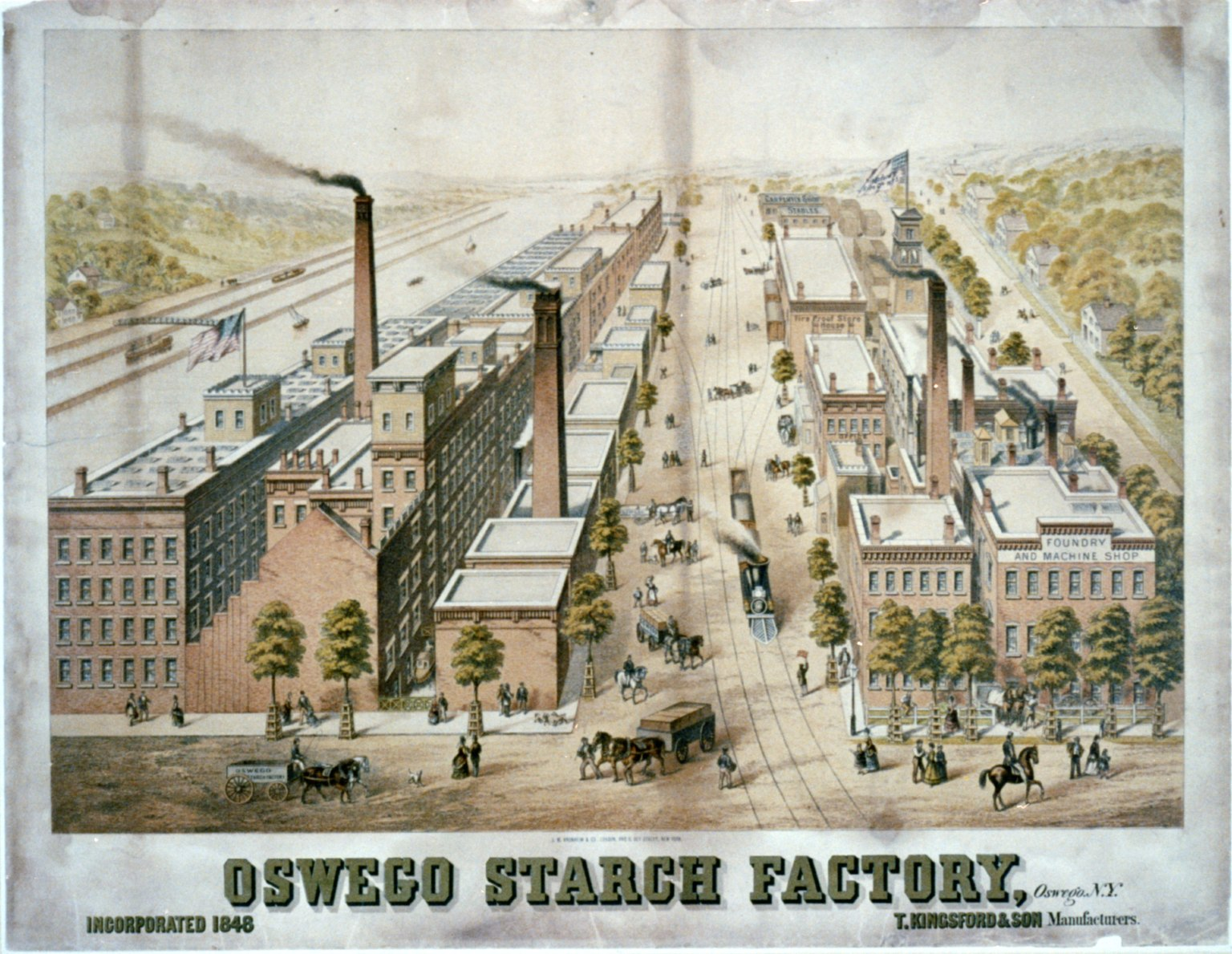
Oswego starch factory, Oswego, N.Y

The 1905 Empire State League began play as an eight–team independent league, with ten teams playing in the season. The Canandaigua, Cortland, Ilion, Lyons, Oneida, Palmyra Mormons, Rome and Seneca Falls teams joined Oswego in beginning league play on May 26, 1905. Oswego placed fifth, 1finishing 4.0 games behind, as Seneca Falls won the championship with a 42–26 record, Several teams folded or relocated during the 1905 season. The Oswego Starchmakers of the Empire State League ended the 1905 season with a record of 32–44, in placing fifth in the final standings.

In 1906, the Empire State League reduced to six teams, beginning the season on May 26, 1906, and becoming a Class D level league. The Starchmakers ended the 1906 season with a 40–38 record, placing fourth in the standings. Larry Sutton and William Mackey served as the Oswego managers. With a record of 48–26, Seneca Falls again won the championship, with Oswego finishing 7.0 games behind.

In their final season of play, the 1907 Oswego Starchmakers won the Empire State League championship. The Oswego Starchmakers ended the Empire State League season with a record of 55–29, placing first under manager Chaucer Elliott. The Oswego Starchmakers finished 1.0 game ahead of second place Seneca Falls in winning the league championship. The six–team, Class D level Empire State League folded following the 1907 season.

Oswego was without minor league baseball until the 1936 Oswego Netherlands began a five-season tenure as members of the Can–Am League.

== The ballpark ==
The Oswego Starchmakers played 1905 to 1907 minor league home games at Richardson Park. The ballpark hosted numerous Oswego minor league teams, spanning from 1885 to 1907. A public works facility occupies the site today. In the era, the ballpark was located at East 11th Street & Seneca Street with trolley service serving the park.

Today, the Oswego County Building and Grounds maintenance facility occupies the ballpark site, located at 111 East 11th Street in Oswego, New York.

== Timeline ==
Year(s)	# Yrs.	Team	Level	League	Ballpark
1905	1	Oswego Starchmakers	Independent	Empire State League	Richardson Park
1906–1907	2	Oswego Starchmakers	Class D	Empire State League	Richardson Park

== Year–by–year records ==
Year	Record	Finish	Manager	Playoffs/Notes
1905	32–44	5th	NA	No playoffs held
1906	40–38	4th	Larry Sutton / William Mackey	No playoffs held
1907	55–29	1st	Chaucer Elliott	League champions

== Notable alumni ==
- Babe Danzig (1906)
- Jim Moroney (1907)
- John Murphy (1906)

== See also ==
- Oswego (minor league baseball) players
