= Ilion Typewriters =

- 1901–1904; (1901-1905); Ilion, New York

Minor league affiliations
- Class: Class C (1901); Class B (1902–1904); Independent (1905)
- League: New York State League (1901–1904); Empire State League (1905)

Major league affiliations
- Team: None

Minor league titles
- League titles (0): None

Team data
- Name: Ilion Typewriters (1901–1904); Ilion (1905)
- Ballpark: Russell Park (1901–1905)

The Ilion Typewriters were a minor league baseball team based in Ilion, New York. From 1901 to 1904, the Ilion "Typewriters" played as members of the New York State League. In 1905, Ilion played a partial season as members of the Independent level Empire State League before the team located during the season.

The "Typewriters" nickname corresponds to E. Remington and Sons being headquartered in Ilion in the era.

Ilion hosted home minor league games at Russell Park

== History ==
Ilion first began minor league play in 1901, when the Ilion Typewriters became members of the Class C level New York State League. Ilion would play four seasons in the New York State League before folding.

The Ilion use of the "Typewriters" moniker corresponds to local industry, as E. Remington and Sons, founded in 1816 by Eliphalet Remington, was located in Ilion, New York and known for manufacturing the first commercial typewriter.

Beginning play in 1901 as members of the eight–team Class C New York State League, the Ilion Typewriters finished their first professional season in last place with a record of 23–82. Ilion finished in eighth place in the New York State League, playing under manager Tim Shinnick, finishing 44.0 games behind the first place Albany Senators. In the final standings, Ilion finished behind fellow league members Albany Senators (72–43), Binghamton Bingoes (69–45), Cortland Wagonmakers/Waverly Wagonmakers (36–68), Rome Romans (62–47), Schenectady Electricians (65–50), Troy Trojans (46–62) and Utica Pent-Ups (68–44). Ilion hosted home minor league games at Russell Park.

Ilion continued play, as the 1902 New York State League was elevated to become a Class B level league. The 1902 Ilion Typewriters finished with a record of 59–47, placing third in the New York State League, playing the season under manager Howard Earl. Ilion finished 9.5 games behind the first place Albany Senators in the final standings.

Ilion placed seventh in the 1903 Class B level New York State League. Under returning manager Howard Earl, the Typewriters ended the season with a 52–73 record, finishing 24.5 games behind the league champion Schenectady Frog Alleys.

Playing under manager Jack Sharrott, the 1904 Ilion Typewriters placed third in the New York State League. With a 75–56 record, Ilion finished 14.0 games behind the first place Syracuse Stars in the New York State League final standings. The Ilion Typewriters franchise did not return to the New York State League after the 1904 season, with the Ilion being replaced by the Wilkes-Barre Barons in the eight–team 1905 league.

Ilion continued play in 1905 and joined the Independent level Empire State League to begin the season. On July 10, 1905, the Ilion franchise relocated to Fulton, New York. The Ilion/Fulton team finished with a 20–39 overall record, placing 6th in the 1905 Empire State League. Minor league baseball has not returned to Ilion, New York.

== The ballpark ==
Ilion teams played minor league home games at Russell Park. Today, Russell Park is still in existence as a public park. Russell Park is located at Frederick Street and Parks Street in Ilion, New York.

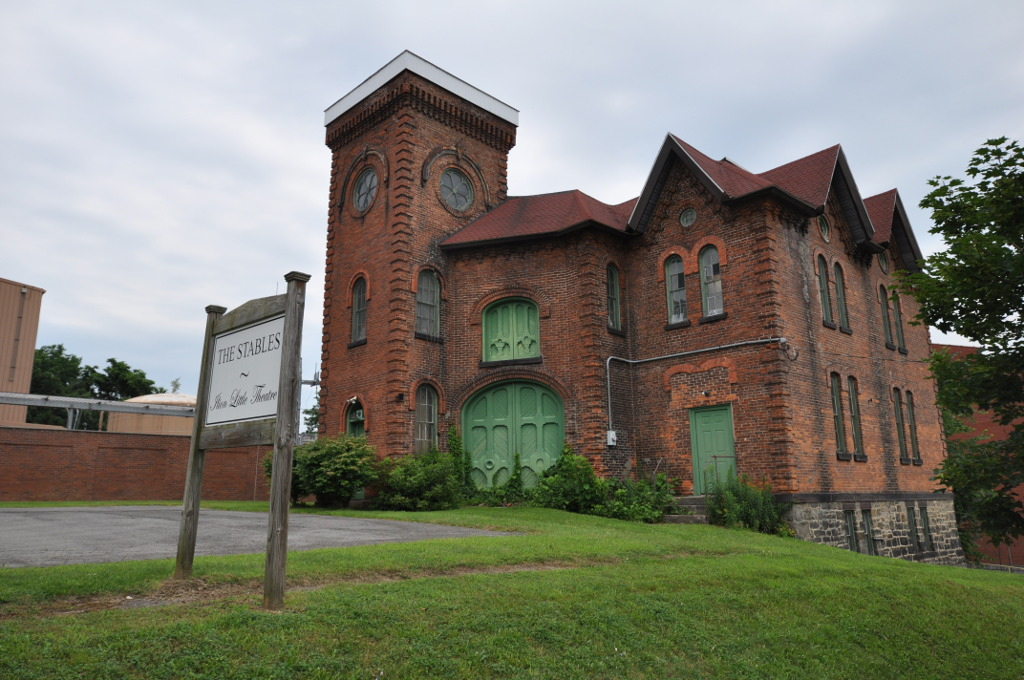
(2017) Remington Stables. National Register of Historic Places. Ilion, New York

== Timeline ==
Year(s)	# Yrs.	Team	Level	League	Ballpark
1901	1	Ilion Typewriters	Class C	New York State League	Russell Park
1902–1904	3	Ilion Typewriters	Class B	New York State League	Russell Park
1905	1	Ilion Typewriters	Independent	Empire State League	Russell Park

== Year-by-year records ==
Year	Record	Finish	Manager	Playoffs/Notes
1901	23–82	8th	Tim Shinnick	No playoffs held
1902	59–47	3rd	Howard Earl	No playoffs held
1903	52–73	7th	Howard Earl	No playoffs held
1904	75–56	3rd	James Sharrott	No playoffs held
1905	20–39	6th	Unknown	Moved to Fulton July 10

== Notable alumni ==
- Red Ames (1903)
- Cy Bowen (1904)
- Bill Chappelle (1904)
- Henry Cote (1901)
- Fred Donovan (1901-1902)
- Tom Donovan (1901)
- Howard Earl (1902–1903, MGR)
- Bill Gannon (1901)
- Frank Hershey (1904)
- Bill Hinchman (1903–1904)
- Harry Hinchman (1902–1904)
- Elmer Horton (1901)
- Jake Livingstone (1901)
- Jim McCormick (1903)
- Cy Morgan (1901)
- Bill Pounds (1901)
- Mike Roach (1904)
- Doc Scanlan (1902–1903)
- Ted Scheffler (1901)
- Nap Shea (1902)
- Tim Shinnick (1901, MGR)
- Johnny Siegle (1901–1904)
- Mike Smith (1904)
- Grant Thatcher (1901–1902)
- Lee Viau (1902)

== See also ==
- Ilion Typewriters players
