= Palmyra Mormans =

- 1897–1898; Palmyra (town), New York

Minor league affiliations
- Class: Class C (1897–1898)
- League: New York State League (1897–1898)

Major league affiliations
- Team: None

Minor league titles
- League titles (0): None

Team data
- Name: Palmyra Mormans (1897–1898)
- Ballpark: Unknown (1897–1898)

The Palmyra Mormans were a minor league baseball team based in Palmyra, New York. In 1897 and 1898, the Mormans played as members of the Class C level New York State League. In 1905, Palmyra played briefly in the Empire State League before relocating during the season.

The team nickname corresponds to Palmyra having been home to Joseph Smith, founder of the Church of Jesus Christ of Latter-day Saints.

== History ==
The Palmyra "Mormans" (the spelling is also "Mormons" in other references) began play in the six–team, Class C level New York State League in 1897. The Auburn Maroons, Batavia Giants, Canandaigua Rustlers, Cortland Hirelings and Lyons teams joined Palmyra in beginning league play on May 12, 1897.

The team use of the "Mormans" moniker corresponds to local history. Palmyra was home to Joseph Smith, the founder of the Church of Jesus Christ of Latter-day Saints.

During their first season of play, manager Charles Faatz wrote a letter to management of the team. The letter was addressed to J.C. Coates, who was on the board of directors as listed on the letterhead for the "Palmyra Base Ball Association Season of 1897." Faatz also directed the letter to F.W Griffith. The letterhead lists F.H Brown as president, W.A. Powers as vice president, C.J. Wimple as secretary and J.W. Phelps as treasurer. E.B. Anderson, J.C Coates, F.H Brown, W.A. Powers and C.J. Wimple are listed as "Directors" on the letterhead. Faatz discusses personnel strategy and finances in the letter. Faatz concluded the letter by stating "I shall...get every out I can for you, let me hear from you at once."

The 1897 Palmyra Mormons ended their first season of play in second place in the New York State League. The Mormans ended the season with a record of 51–35, playing the season under manager Charles Faatz. Palmyra finished 1.0 games behind the league champion Canandaigua Rustlers in the final standings.

Palmyra continued play in the 1898 New York State League, before the franchise relocated during the season. The league had expanded to eight teams to begin the season. On July 31, 1898, Palmyra transferred to Johnstown with a record of 25–35. Johnstown then folded on August 16, 1898. The team had an overall record of 29–40, playing under managers Doc Kennedy and Cyclone Ryan before folding.

Palmyra briefly hosted minor league baseball again in 1905, when the team began the season as a member of the independent Empire State League. The Palmyra team moved to Geneva, New York in June 1905. The Palmyra/Geneva team had a 33–22 overall record and placed second in the league final standings."

Geneva continued play in the 1906 Empire State League. Palmyra has not hosted another minor league team.

== The ballparks ==
The name of the home ballpark for the Palmyra minor league teams is unknown.

== Timeline ==
| Year(s) | # Yrs. | Team | Level | League |
|---|---|---|---|---|
| 1897–1898 | 1 | Palmyra Mormans | Class C | New York State League |
| 1905 | 1 | Palmyra | Independent | Empire State League |

== Year–by–year records ==
| Year | Record | Finish | Manager | Playoffs/notes |
|---|---|---|---|---|
| 1897 | 51–35 | 2nd | Charles Faatz | No playoffs held |
| 1898 | 29–40 | NA | Doc Kennedy / Cyclone Ryan | Palmyra (25–35) moved to Johnstown July 31 |
| 1905 | 33–22 | 2nd | Bade Myers / George Williams | Team moved to Geneva in June |

== Notable alumni ==
- Harvey Bailey (1897)
- Bob Becker (1897)
- Harry Croft (1898)
- Henry Fournier (1877)
- Billy Gilbert (1898)
- George Henry (1898)
- Ed Householder (1897)
- Doc Kennedy (1898, MGR)
- John Leighton (1898)
- Jim McGuire (1898)
- Billy Milligan (1897)
- Carlton Molesworth (1898)
- Skel Roach (1898)
- Cyclone Ryan (1897), (1898, MGR)
- Biff Sheehan (1898)
- Tim Shinnick (1898)
- Dummy Stephenson (1898)
- Grant Thatcher (1898)
- Stan Yerkes (1898)

== See also ==
- Palmyra Mormans players.
