= List of professional sports teams in Ontario =

The province of Ontario, Canada, has professional sports teams in a wide variety of sports:

== Active teams ==
=== Major league teams ===
Ontario is home to eight major professional sports teams. Five of the teams play in Toronto, two play in Ottawa and one in Hamilton.

Baseball
League	Team	City	Stadium	Capacity
MLB	Toronto Blue Jays	Toronto	Rogers Centre	39,150
Basketball
League	Team	City	Arena	Capacity
NBA	Toronto Raptors	Toronto	Scotiabank Arena	19,800
Canadian football
League	Team	City	Stadium	Capacity
CFL	Hamilton Tiger-Cats	Hamilton	Hamilton Stadium	23,218
CFL	Ottawa Redblacks	Ottawa	TD Place Stadium	24,000
CFL	Toronto Argonauts	Toronto	BMO Field	28,180
Ice hockey
League	Team	City	Arena	Capacity
NHL	Ottawa Senators	Ottawa	Canadian Tire Centre	17,010
NHL	Toronto Maple Leafs	Toronto	Scotiabank Arena	18,819
Soccer
League	Team	City	Stadium	Capacity
MLS	Toronto FC	Toronto	BMO Field	28,180

=== Other professional sports teams ===
==== Men's leagues ====
Baseball
League	Team	City	Stadium	Capacity
FL (Ind.)	Ottawa Titans	Ottawa	Ottawa Stadium	10,332
CBL (Ind.)	Barrie Baycats	Barrie	Athletic Kulture Stadium	1,500
CBL (Ind.)	Brantford Red Sox	Brantford	Arnold Anderson Stadium	2,000
CBL (Ind.)	Chatham-Kent Barnstormers	Chatham	Fergie Jenkins Field	1,443
CBL (Ind.)	Guelph Royals	Guelph	Hastings Stadium	2,500
CBL (Ind.)	Hamilton Cardinals	Hamilton	Bernie Arbour Memorial Stadium	3,000
CBL (Ind.)	Kitchener Panthers	Kitchener	Jack Couch Park	1,400
CBL (Ind.)	London Majors	London	Labatt Memorial Park	5,200
CBL (Ind.)	Toronto Maple Leafs	Toronto	Dominico Field	1,000
CBL (Ind.)	Welland Jackfish	Welland	Welland Stadium	3,248
Basketball
League	Team	City	Arena	Capacity
G League	Raptors 905	Mississauga	Mississauga Sports and Entertainment Centre	5,400
CEBL	Brampton Honey Badgers	Brampton	CAA Centre	5,000
CEBL	Niagara River Lions	St. Catharines	Meridian Centre	4,030
CEBL	Ottawa Blackjacks	Ottawa	TD Place Arena	9,500
CEBL	Scarborough Shooting Stars	Toronto	Toronto Pan Am Sports Centre	2,000
BSL	Sudbury Five	Sudbury	Sudbury Community Arena	4,640
BSL	Windsor Express	Windsor	WFCU Centre	6,450
Ice hockey
League	Team	City	Arena	Capacity
AHL	Belleville Senators	Belleville	CIBC Place	4,365
AHL	Hamilton Hammers	Hamilton	TD Coliseum	16,386
AHL	Toronto Marlies	Toronto	Coca-Cola Coliseum	8,140
LNAH	Manotick Mariners	Ottawa	Mike O'Neil Arena	300
Lacrosse
League	Team	City	Arena	Capacity
NLL	Oshawa FireWolves	Oshawa	Tribute Communities Centre	5,180
NLL	Toronto Rock	Hamilton	TD Coliseum	16,534
Soccer
League	Team	City	Stadium	Capacity
MLSNP	Toronto FC II	Toronto	York Lions Stadium	4,000
CPL	Atlético Ottawa	Ottawa	TD Place Stadium	24,000
CPL	Forge FC	Hamilton	Hamilton Stadium	23,218
CPL	Inter Toronto FC	Toronto	York Lions Stadium	4,000
Ultimate Frisbee
League	Team	City	Stadium	Capacity
UFA	Toronto Rush	Toronto	Varsity Stadium	5,000

==== Women's leagues ====
Basketball
League	Team	City	Arena	Capacity
WNBA	Toronto Tempo	Toronto	Coca-Cola Coliseum	8,500
Ice hockey
League	Team	City	Arena	Capacity
PWHL	Hamilton Havoc	Hamilton	TD Coliseum	16,386
PWHL	Ottawa Charge	Ottawa	Canadian Tire Centre	17,010
PWHL	Toronto Sceptres	Toronto	Coca-Cola Coliseum	8,140
Soccer
NSL	AFC Toronto	Toronto	York Lions Stadium	4,000
NSL	Ottawa Rapid FC	Ottawa	TD Place Stadium	24,000

=== Map of cities with a professional sports team ===
Location with a major professional sports team
Location with a professional sports team

== Former teams ==
=== Major league teams ===
Basketball
League	Team	City	Years
BAA	Toronto Huskies	Toronto	1946-1947
Canadian football
League	Team	City	Years
CFL	Ottawa Rough Riders	Ottawa	1958-1996
CFL	Ottawa Renegades	Ottawa	2002-2006
IRFU	Hamilton Tigers	Hamilton	1907-1950
IRFU	Hamilton Wildcats	Hamilton	1948-1950
IRFU	Hamilton Tiger-Cats	Hamilton	1950-1957
IRFU	Ottawa Rough Riders	Ottawa	1907-1957
IRFU	Toronto Argonauts	Toronto	1907-1957
Ice hockey
League	Team	City	Years
NHL	Hamilton Tigers	Hamilton	1920-1925
NHL	Ottawa Senators	Ottawa	1917-1931; 1932-1934
NHA	Cobalt Silver Kings	Cobalt	1909-1910
NHA	Haileybury Comets	Haileybury	1909-1911
NHA	Ottawa Senators	Ottawa	1909-1917
NHA	Renfrew Creamery Kings	Renfrew	1909-1911
NHA	Toronto Blueshirts	Toronto	1912-1917
NHA	Toronto Tecumsehs	Toronto	1912-1913
NHA	Toronto Ontarios	Toronto	1913-1914
NHA	Toronto Shamrocks	Toronto	1914-1915
NHA	Toronto 228th Battalion	Toronto	1916-1917
WHA	Ottawa Nationals	Ottawa	1972-1973
WHA	Ottawa Civics	Ottawa	1976
WHA	Toronto Toros	Toronto	1973-1976

=== Other former teams ===
==== Men's leagues ====
American football
League	Team	City	Years
COFL	Toronto Rifles	Toronto	1965-1967
AFC	Sarnia Golden Bears	Sarnia	1961
Arena football
League	Team	City	Years
AFL	Toronto Phantoms	Toronto	2001-2002
Can-Am	Ontario Niagara Spartans	Niagara Falls	2017
Baseball
League	Team	City	Years
IL (AAA)	Hamilton Tigers	Hamilton	1918
IL (AAA)	Ottawa Giants	Ottawa	1951
IL (AAA)	Ottawa Athletics	Ottawa	1952-1954
IL (AAA)	Ottawa Lynx	Ottawa	1993-2007
IL (AAA)	Toronto Maple Leafs	Toronto	1912-1967
EL (AA)	London Tigers	London	1989-1993
NYPL (SS-A)	Hamilton Redbirds	Hamilton	1988-1992
NYPL (SS-A)	St. Catharines Blue Jays	St. Catharines	1986-1994
NYPL (SS-A)	St. Catharines Stompers	St. Catharines	1995-1999
NYPL (SS-A)	Welland Pirates	Welland	1989-1994
CL (B, C, D, Ind.)	Berlin Green Sox	Berlin	1911
CL (B, C, D, Ind.)	Berlin Busy Bees	Berlin	1912-1915
CL (B, C, D, Ind.)	Brantford Indians	Brantford	1905
CL (B, C, D, Ind.)	Brantford Red Sox	Brantford	1911-1915
CL (B, C, D, Ind.)	Chatham Reds	Chatham	1898-1899
CL (B, C, D, Ind.)	Galt Baseball Club	Galt	1896
CL (B, C, D, Ind.)	Guelph Maple Leafs	Guelph	1885; 1896-1897; 1899; 1915
CL (B, C, D, Ind.)	Hamilton Clippers	Hamilton	1885
CL (B, C, D, Ind.)	Hamilton Primrose	Hamilton	1885
CL (B, C, D, Ind.)	Hamilton Blackbirds	Hamilton	1896-1899
CL (B, C, D, Ind.)	Hamilton Kolts	Hamilton	1911-1912
CL (B, C, D, Ind.)	Hamilton Hams	Hamilton	1913-1915
CL (B, C, D, Ind.)	Ingersoll Baseball Club	Ingersoll	1905
CL (B, C, D, Ind.)	London Cockneys	London	1885; 1896-1899; 1911
CL (B, C, D, Ind.)	London Tecumsehs	London	1912-1915
CL (B, C, D, Ind.)	Ottawa Senators	Ottawa	1912-1915
CL (B, C, D, Ind.)	Peterborough Whitecaps	Peterborough	1912
CL (B, C, D, Ind.)	Peterborough Petes	Peterborough	1913-1914
CL (B, C, D, Ind.)	Simcoe Baseball Club	Simcoe	1905
CL (B, C, D, Ind.)	Stratford Poets	Stratford	1899
CL (B, C, D, Ind.)	St. Thomas Saints	St. Thomas	1898-1899; 1905; 1911-1915
CL (B, C, D, Ind.)	Toronto Torontos	Toronto	1885
CL (B, C, D, Ind.)	Toronto Canucks	Toronto	1897
CL (B, C, D, Ind.)	Toronto Beavers	Toronto	1914
CL (B, C, D, Ind.)	Woodstock Bains	Woodstock	1899
CL (B, C, D, Ind.)	Woodstock Maroons	Woodstock	1905
ECL (B)	Ottawa Senators	Ottawa	1922
ECL (B)	Ottawa Canadiens	Ottawa	1923
MOL (B)	Brantford Red Sox	Brantford	1919-1921
MOL (B)	Brantford Brants	Brantford	1922
MOL (B)	Hamilton Tigers	Hamilton	1919-1923
MOL (B)	Hamilton Clippers	Hamilton	1924-1925
MOL (B)	Kitchener Beavers	Kitchener	1919-1921
MOL (B)	Kitchener Terriers	Kitchener	1922
MOL (B)	Kitchener Colts	Kitchener	1925
MOL (B)	London Tecumsehs	London	1919-1924
MOL (B)	London Indians	London	1925
MOL (B)	Port Huron-Sarnia Saints	Sarnia	1922
OQVL (B)	Ottawa-Hull Canadiens	Ottawa	1924
Can-Am (C)	Brockville Pirates	Brockville	1936
Can-Am (C)	Brockville Blues	Brockville	1937
Can-Am (C)	Cornwall Bisons	Cornwall	1938
Can-Am (C)	Cornwall Maple Leafs	Cornwall	1939
Can-Am (C)	Ottawa Senators	Ottawa	1936; 1939
Can-Am (C)	Ottawa Braves	Ottawa	1937-1938
Can-Am (C)	Ottawa-Ogdensburg Senators	Ottawa	1940
Can-Am (C)	Perth Blue Cats	Perth	1936
Can-Am (C)	Perth-Cornwall Bisons	Perth; Cornwall	1937
Can-Am (C)	Smiths Falls Beavers	Smiths Falls	1937
BL (C/D)	Cornwall Canadians	Cornwall	1951
BL (C/D)	Kingston Ponies	Kingston	1946-1951
BL (C/D)	Ottawa Nationals	Ottawa	1947; 1950
BL (C/D)	Ottawa Senators	Ottawa	1948-1949
BL (C/D)	Windsor Baseball Club	Windsor	1912-1913
PONY (D)	Hamilton Red Wings	Hamilton	1939-1942; 1956
PONY (D)	Hamilton Cardinals	Hamilton	1946-1955
PONY (D)	London Pirates	London	1940-1941
Can-Am (Ind.)	Ottawa Rapidz	Ottawa	2008
Can-Am (Ind.)	Ottawa Champions	Ottawa	2015-2019
CBL (Ind.)	London Monarchs	London	2003
CBL (Ind.)	Niagara Stars	Welland	2003
FL (Ind.)	London Werewolves	London	1999-2001
FL (Ind.)	London Rippers	London	2012
IAPBP (Ind.)	Guelph Maple Leafs	Guelph	1877
IAPBP (Ind.)	Hamilton Mountaineers	Hamilton	1888; 1890
IAPBP (Ind.)	Hamilton Hams	Hamilton	1889
IAPBP (Ind.)	London Tecumsehs	London	1877-1878; 1888-1890
IAPBP (Ind.)	Toronto Canucks	Toronto	1888-1890
NAL (Ind.)	Welland Aqua-Ducks	Welland	1995-1996
Nor-L (Ind.)	Fort William Canadians	Fort William	1914-1915
Nor-L (Ind.)	Fort William-Port Arthur Canadians	Fort William; Port Arthur	1916
Basketball
League	Team	City	Years
CBA	Toronto Tornados	Toronto	1983-1985
WBL	Hamilton Skyhawks	Hamilton	1992
BSL	KW Titans	Kitchener	2023-2026
BSL	London Lightning	London	2023-2025
CEBL	Guelph Nighthawks	Guelph	2019-2022
CEBL	Hamilton Honey Badgers	Hamilton	2019-2022
NBL-C	Brampton A's	Brampton	2013-2015
NBL-C	KW Titans	Kitchener	2016-2023
NBL-C	London Lightning	London	2011-2023
NBL-C	Mississauga Power	Mississauga	2013-2015
NBL-C	Niagara River Lions	St. Catharines	2015-2018
NBL-C	Orangeville A's	Orangeville	2015-2017
NBL-C	Oshawa Power	Oshawa	2011-2013
NBL-C	Ottawa SkyHawks	Ottawa	2013-2014
NBL-C	Sudbury Five	Sudbury	2018-2023
NBL-C	Windsor Express	Windsor	2012-2023
Cricket
League	Team	City	Years
GT20	Bangla Tigers Mississauga	Mississauga	2024
GT20	Brampton Wolves	Brampton	2018-2024
GT20	Mississauga Panthers	Mississauga	2023
GT20	Toronto Nationals	Toronto	2018-2024
Ice hockey
League	Team	City	Years
AHL	Cornwall Aces	Cornwall	1993-1996
AHL	Hamilton Canucks	Hamilton	1992-1994
AHL	Hamilton Bulldogs	Hamilton	1996-2015
AHL	Newmarket Saints	Newmarket	1986-1991
AHL	St. Catharines Saints	St. Catharines	1982-1986
AHL	Toronto Roadrunners	Toronto	2003-2004
CHL	Brampton Beast	Brampton	2013-2014
CPHL	Hamilton Tigers	Hamilton	1926-1929
CPHL	Kitchener Millionaires	Kitchener	1927-1928
CPHL	Kitchener Flying Dutchmen	Kitchener	1928-1929
CPHL	London Panthers	London	1926-1929
CPHL	Niagara Falls Cataracts	Niagara Falls	1926-1929
CPHL	Stratford Nationals	Stratford	1926-1928
CPHL	Toronto Ravinas	Toronto	1927-1928
CPHL	Toronto Millionaires	Toronto	1928-1929
CPHL	Windsor Bulldogs	Windsor	1926-1929
ECHL	Brampton Beast	Brampton	2014-2020
EPHL	Hull-Ottawa Canadiens	Ottawa	1959-1963
EPHL	Kingston Frontenacs	Kingston	1959-1963
EPHL	Kitchener Beavers	Kitchener	1960-1962
EPHL	North Bay Trappers	North Bay	1961-1962
EPHL	Sault Thunderbirds	Sault Ste. Marie	1959-1962
EPHL	Sudbury Wolves	Sudbury	1959-1963
IHL 1929-1936	Buffalo Bisons	Fort Erie	1929-1936
IHL 1929-1936	Hamilton Tigers	Hamilton	1929-1930
IHL 1929-1936	London Panthers	London	1929-1936
IHL 1929-1936	Niagara Falls Cataracts	Niagara Falls	1929-1930
IHL 1929-1936	Toronto Millionaires	Toronto	1929-1930
IHL 1929-1936	Windsor Bulldogs	Windsor	1929-1936
IHL 1945-2001	Chatham Maroons	Chatham	1949-1952; 1963-1964
IHL 1945-2001	Windsor Spitfires	Windsor	1945-1950
IHL 1945-2001	Windsor Gotfredsons	Windsor	1945-1946
IHL 1945-2001	Windsor Staffords	Windsor	1946-1948
IHL 1945-2001	Windsor Ryan Cretes	Windsor	1948-1950
IPHL	Canadian Sault Hockey Club	Sault Ste. Marie	1904-1907
MPHL	Kenora Thistles	Kenora	1906-1908
OPHL	Berlin Dutchmen	Berlin	1908-1911
OPHL	Brantford Indians	Brantford	1908-1911
OPHL	Galt Professionals	Galt	1909-1911
OPHL	Guelph Royals	Guelph	1908-1909
OPHL	St. Catharines Pros	St. Catharines	1909
OPHL	Toronto Pros	Toronto	1908-1909
OPHL	Waterloo Colts	Waterloo	1910-1911
UHL	Brantford Smoke	Brantford	1991-1998
UHL	Chatham Wheels	Chatham	1992-1994
UHL	London Wildcats	London	1994-1995
UHL	St. Thomas Wildcats	St. Thomas	1991-1994
UHL	Thunder Bay Thunder Hawks	Thunder Bay	1991-1993
UHL	Thunder Bay Senators	Thunder Bay	1993-1996
UHL	Thunder Bay Thunder Cats	Thunder Bay	1996-1999
Indoor Soccer
League	Team	City	Years
NPSL	Toronto Shooting Stars	Toronto	1996-1997
NPSL	Toronto ThunderHawks	Mississauga	2000-2001
Inline hockey
League	Team	City	Years
RHI	Ottawa Loggers	Ottawa	1995-1996
RHI	Ottawa Wheels	Ottawa	1997
RHI	Toronto Planets	Toronto	1993
Lacrosse
League	Team	City	Years
NLL	Ontario Raiders	Hamilton	1998
NLL	Ottawa Rebel	Ottawa	2001-2003
NLL	Ottawa Black Bears	Ottawa	2024-2026
Rugby
League	Team	City	Years
RFL	Toronto Wolfpack	Toronto	2017-2020
NARL	Toronto Wolfpack	Toronto	2021-2022
MLR	Toronto Arrows	Toronto	2019-2023
Soccer
League	Team	City	Years
NASL 1968-1984	Toronto Falcons	Toronto	1968
NASL 1968-1984	Toronto Metros	Toronto	1971-1974
NASL 1968-1984	Toronto Metros-Croatia	Toronto	1971-1974
NASFL	Toronto Greenbacks	Toronto	1946-1947
NPSL	Toronto Falcons	Toronto	1967
USA	Toronto City	Toronto	1967
APSL	Toronto Blizzard	Toronto	1993
APSL	Toronto Rockets	Toronto	1994
A-League	Toronto Lynx	Toronto	1997-2004
USL-1	Toronto Lynx	Toronto	2005-2006
NASL 2011-2017	Ottawa Fury FC	Ottawa	2014-2016
USL-C	Ottawa Fury FC	Ottawa	2017-2019
USL-C	Toronto FC II	Toronto	2015-2018
USL1	Toronto FC II	Toronto	2019-2021
ECPSL	Hamilton Steelers	Hamilton	1961-1964
ECPSL	Primo Hamilton FC	Hamilton	1965-1966
ECPSL	Toronto City FC	Toronto	1961-1965
ECPSL	Toronto Italia FC	Toronto	1961-1964
ECPSL	Toronto Roma FC	Toronto	1962-1964
ECPSL	Inter-Roma	Toronto	1965-1966
ECPSL	Italia Falcons	Toronto	1965-1966
CPSL	Hamilton Steelers	Hamilton	1983
CPSL	Mississauga Croatia	Mississauga	1983
CPSL	Toronto Nationals	Toronto	1983
CSL	Hamilton Steelers	Hamilton	1987-1991
CSL	Kitchener Spirit	Kitchener	1990
CSL	Kitchener Kickers	Kitchener	1991
CSL	London Lasers	London	1990; 1992
CSL	North York Rockets	North York	1987-1992
CSL	Ottawa Intrepid	Ottawa	1988-1990
CSL	Toronto Blizzard	Toronto	1987-1992
Ultimate Frisbee
UFA	Ottawa Outlaws	Ottawa	2015-2022

==== Women's leagues ====
Ice hockey
CWHL	Markham Thunder	Markham	2017-2019
CWHL	Toronto Furies	Toronto	2017-2019
PHF	Toronto Six	Toronto	2020-2023

== See also ==
- Professional sports in Canada
- List of professional sports teams in Canada by city
