= Oswego Netherlands =

- 1936–1940; Oswego, New York

Minor league affiliations
- Class: Class C (1936–1940)
- League: Can–Am League (1936–1940)

Major league affiliations
- Team: Cleveland Indians (1937–1938); Washington Senators (1939)

Minor league titles
- League titles (0): None
- Wild card berths (2): 1937; 1939

Team data
- Name: Oswego Netherlands (1936–1940)
- Ballpark: Otis Park (1936–1940)

The Oswego Netherlands were a minor league baseball team based in Oswego, New York, United States. From 1936 to 1940, the "Netherlands" played as members of the Class C level Can–Am League. Oswego was a minor league affiliate of the Cleveland Indians in 1937 and 1938 and Washington Senators in 1939. The Oswego Netherlands hosted minor league home games at Otis Park.

Baseball Hall of Fame member Bob Lemon played for the 1938 Oswego Netherlands at age 17, in his first professional season.

== History ==
After minor league baseball began in 1885 with the Oswego Sweegs of the New York State League, the Oswego Netherlands were preceded by the 1907 Oswego Starchmakers, who won the championship in the final season of the Empire State League.

In 1936, the Oswego "Netherlands" began play in the six–team, Class C level Can–Am League. Oswego joined the Brockville Pirates, Ogdensburg Colts, Ottawa Senators, Perth Blue Cats and Watertown Grays in beginning league play on May 20, 1936.

The "Netherlands" nickname corresponds with Oswego's history and culture. The British and Dutch had first established a settlement at and Forts at Oswego in 1722.

In their first season of Can–Am play, the Oswego Netherlands finished in last place. Oswego ended the 1936 season with a record of 32–51 record, as John Dashner and George Kunes served as managers. Oswego placed sixth, finishing 20.5 games behind the first place Perth Blue Cats.

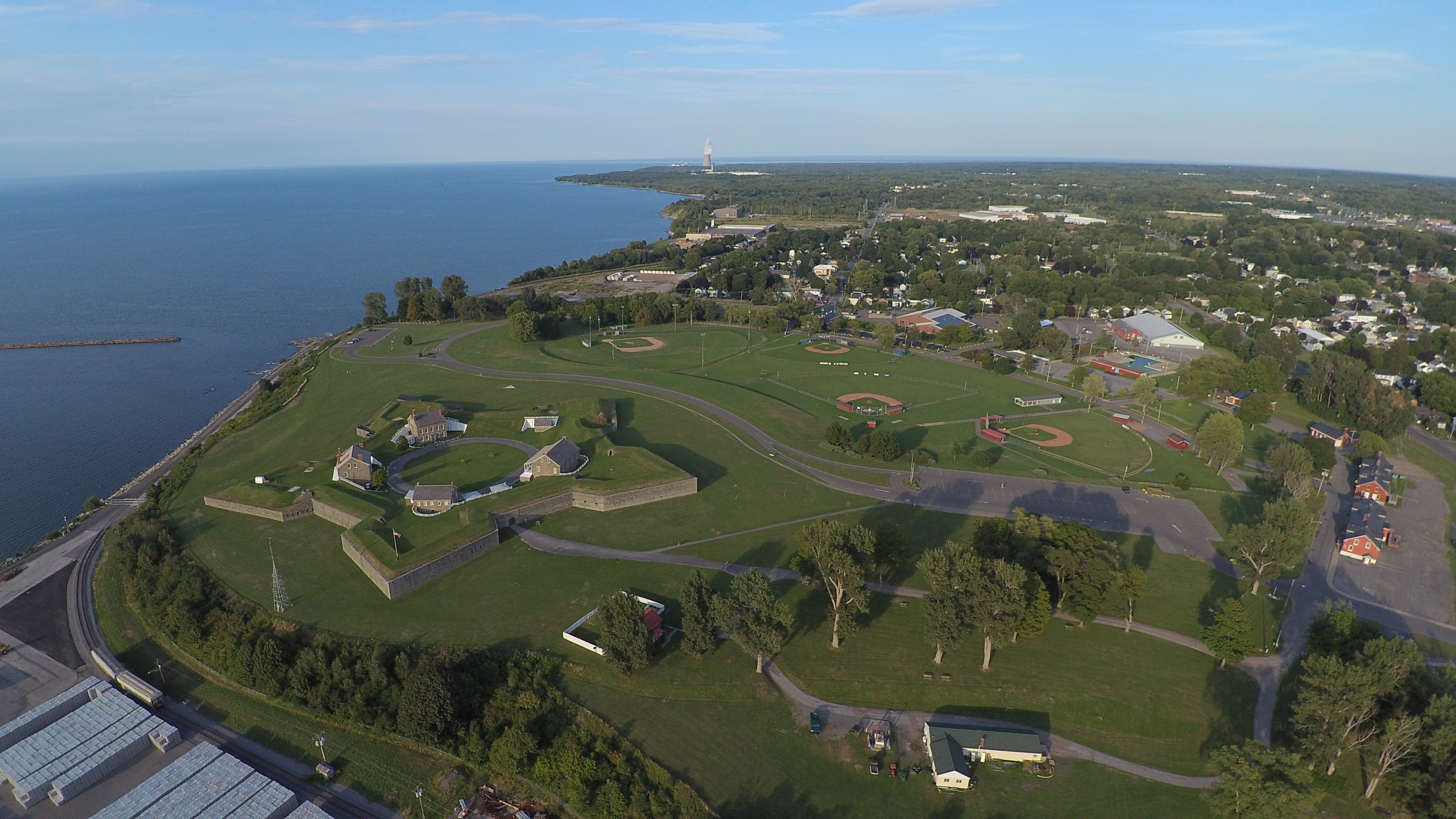
(2016) Fort Oswego. Oswego, New York

The 1937 Oswego Netherlands became a minor league affiliate of the Cleveland Indians, placed second in the eight–team league and qualified for the playoffs. The Netherlands ended the Can–Am season with a record of 67–40. Riley Parker and Blane Kunes served as managers, as Oswego finished 1.5 games behind the first place Perth-Cornwall Grays. In the first round of the playoffs, the Ogdensburg Colts defeated Oswego 3 games to 1.

The Oswego Netherlands continued an affiliate of the Cleveland Indians in 1938. The Netherlands placed sixth in the 1938 Can–Am standings with a record of 54–69, playing the season under manager Riley Parker. Oswego finished 27.0 games behind the first place Amsterdam Rugmakers.

In his first professional season, at age 17, Baseball Hall of Fame member Bob Lemon played for Oswego in 1938. In 75 games, Lemon hit .312 with 7 home runs as a hitter for Oswego. After advancing to the major leagues as a hitter, Lemon switched to pitching in 1946, leading to his pitching career with 7 All-Star game selections and 207 career wins. Playing as an outfielder in 1938, Lemon has been signed by the Cleveland Indians to a contract for $100.00 per month before reporting to Oswego.

The Oswego Netherlands placed second in 1939, becoming an affiliate of the Washington Senators. Oswego ended the eight–team Can–Am season with a record of 69–53, placing second and finishing 12.0 games behind the first place Amsterdam Rugmakers. Art Funk and Blaine Kunes served as managers. In the first round of playoffs, the Amsterdam Rugmakers defeated Oswego 4 games to 2.

In their final season of play, the Oswego Netherlands placed sixth in the Can–Am League and did not qualify for the playoffs. The Netherlands ended the 1940 season with a record of 58–63, as Blaine Kunes and Art Funk again served as managers. Oswego finished 25.0 games behind the first place Ottawa-Ogdensburg Senators in the final regular season standings.

Oswego did not continue play in the 1941 Can–Am League, as the franchise folded following the 1940 season. Oswego has not hosted another minor league team.

== The ballpark ==
The Oswego Starchmakers played minor league home games at Otis Park. The ballpark had a capacity of 3,000 in 1936, with field dimensions of (Left, Center, Right): 550–585–428 in 1936 and 354–491–347 in 1939. The park was named for Oswego mayor John Otis. The grandstand was torn down in the 1950's, as Frederick Leighton Elementary School was built on the site. The ballpark was located at Hillside Avenue & Buccaneer Boulevard. Today, Leighton Elementary is located at 1 Buccaneer Boulevard.

== Timeline ==
Year(s)	# Yrs.	Team	Level	League	Affiliate	Ballpark
1936	1	Oswego Netherlands	Class C	Can–Am League	None	Otis Park
1937–1938	2	Oswego Netherlands	Class C	Can–Am League	Cleveland Indians	Otis Park
1939	1	Oswego Netherlands	Class C	Can–Am League	Washington Senators	Otis Park
1940	1	Oswego Netherlands	Class C	Can–Am League	None	Otis Park

== Year–by–year records ==
Year	Record	Finish	Manager	Attend	Playoffs/Notes
1936	32–51	6th	John Dashner / Blane Kunes	NA	Did not qualify
1937	67–40	2nd	Riley Parker / Blane Kunes	21,076	Lost in 1st round
1938	54–69	6th	Riley Parker	16,522	Did not qualify
1939	69–53	2nd	Art Funk / Blane Kunes	25,488	Lost in 1st round
1940	58–63	6th	Art Funk / Blane Kunes	16,478	Did not qualify

== Notable alumni ==
- Bob Lemon (1938) Inducted Baseball Hall of Fame, 1976
- Bill Kalfass (1940)
- Mike Naymick (1938)
- Frank Skaff (1906)
- Glenn Spencer (1940)
- Vince Ventura (1940)

== See also ==
- Oswego Netherlands players
