= Can–Am League (1936–1951) =

Canadian–American baseball minor league

Canadian–American League
- Most recent season or competition: 1951 Can–Am League season
- Sport: Baseball
- Founded: 1936
- Folded: 1951
- Commissioner: Fr. Harold J. Martin
- Country: United States

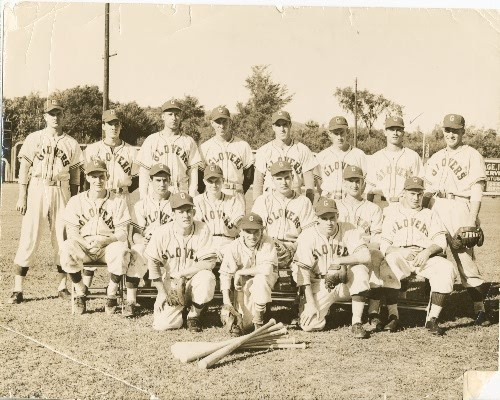
Gloversville Glovers

The Canadian–American League, nicknamed the Can–Am League, was a Class C level minor league baseball circuit which ran from 1936 through 1951, with a three-year break during World War II.

== Teams ==
- Amsterdam Rugmakers, 1938–1942, 1946–1951 (Amsterdam, New York)
- Auburn Bouleys, 1938; Auburn Colts, 1940 (Auburn, New York)
- Brockville Pirates, 1936; Brockville Blues, 1937 (Brockville, Ontario)
- Cornwall Bisons, 1938; Cornwall Maple Leafs, 1939 (Cornwall, Ontario)
- Gloversville Glovers, 1937; Gloversville-Johnstown Glovers, 1938–1942, 1946–1951 (Johnstown, New York)
- Kingston Colonials, 1951 (Kingston, New York)
- Massena Grays, 1936
- Ogdensburg Colts, 1936–1939
- Oneonta Indians, 1940–1942; Oneonta Red Sox, 1946–1951
- Oswego Netherlands, 1936–1940
- Ottawa Senators, 1936, 1939; Ottawa Braves, 1937–1938; Ottawa-Ogdensburg Senators, 1940 (Ottawa)
- Perth Blue Cats, 1936; Perth-Cornwall Bisons, 1937 (Perth, Ontario)
- Pittsfield Electrics, 1941–1942, 1946–1948; Pittsfield Indians, 1949–1950; Pittsfield Phillies, 1951 (Wahconah Park)
- Quebec Athletics, 1941–1942; Quebec Alouettes, 1946–1948; Quebec Braves, 1949–1950
- Rome Colonels, 1937–1942, 1946–1951
- Schenectady Blue Jays, 1946–1950 (Schenectady, New York)
- Smiths Falls Beavers, 1937 (Smiths Falls, Ontario)
- Trois Rivieres Renards, 1941–1942; Trois Rivieres Royals, 1946-1950
- Utica Braves, 1939–1942
- Watertown Grays, 1936

== League Champions ==
- 1936 Perth Blue Cats/Royals
- 1937 Ogdensburg Colts
- 1938 Cornwall Bisons
- 1939 Rome Colonels
- 1940 Amsterdam Rugmakers
- 1941 Oneonta Indians
- 1942 Ogdensburg Colts
- 1946 Trois-Rivières Royals
- 1947 Schenectady Blue Jays
- 1948 Oneonta Red Sox
- 1949 Quebec Braves
- 1950 Quebec Braves
- 1951 Oneonta Red Sox
