= Can-Am League (disambiguation) =

Can–Am League (Canadian American Association of Professional Baseball) was a professional baseball league (2005–2019).

Can-Am League may also refer to:

- Canadian–American Hockey League, a former professional ice hockey league (1926–1936)
- Can–Am League (1936–1951), a former class C minor league baseball circuit

== See also ==
- Can–Am (disambiguation)
