= Empire State League (1905–1907) =

- Classification: Indpependent (1905); Class D (1906–1907)
- Sport: Minor League Baseball
- First season: 1905
- Folded: 1907
- President: M.T. Roche (1905–1907)
- No. of teams: 14
- Country: United States of America
- Most titles: 2 Seneca Falls (1905–1906)
- Related competitions: Empire State League (1913); Empire State League (1987)

The Empire State League was a minor league baseball league that played from 1905 to 1907. The 14 different league franchises were based exclusively in New York (state). The league name was succeeded by the 1913 Empire State League based in Georgia and Empire State League (1987) based in New York (state).

== History ==
On March 22, 1905, the Empire State League was formed at a meeting held in Syracuse, New York. The teams were selected and R.C. Mayor of Rome was elected secretary and treasurer. Salaries were set at $600.00 per month for each team.

The 1905 Empire State League began play as an eight–team independent league on May 26, 1905. Seneca Falls won the championship with a 42–26 record and several teams folded or relocated during the 1905 season.

In 1906, the Empire State League reduced to six teams, beginning the season on May 26, 1906, and becoming a Class D level minor league. With a record of 48–26, Seneca Falls again won the championship.

In its final season of play, the 1907 Empire State League continued play as a six–team Class D level league and crowned a new champion. The Oswego Starchmakers finished 1.0 game ahead of second place Seneca Falls to win the league championship.

M.T. Roche served as president of the Empire State League for all three seasons of play.

== Cities represented ==
- Auburn, NY: Auburn 1906–1907
- Canandaigua, NY: Canandaigua 1905
- Cortland, NY: Cortland 1905
- Fulton, NY: Fulton 1905–1907
- Geneva, NY: Geneva 1905–1907
- Ilion, NY: Ilion 1905
- Lyons, NY: Lyons 1905, 1907
- Oneida, NY: Oneida 1905
- Oswego, NY: Oswego Starchmakers 1905–1907
- Palmyra, NY: Palmyra 1905
- Penn Yan, NY: Penn Yan 1906
- Rome, NY: Rome 1905
- Seneca Falls, NY: Seneca Falls 1905–1907
- Syracuse, NY: Syracuse 1906

== Standings & statistics ==
1905 Empire State League

Team standings	W	L	PCT	GB	Managers
Seneca Falls	42	26	.618	-	Larry Sutton / J. Doyle
Palmyra / Geneva	33	22	.600	2½	Bade Myers / George Williams
Rome	41	30	.577	2½	NA
Lyons	31	35	.470	10	Jay Faatz
Oswego Starchmakers	32	44	.421	14	NA
Ilion / Fulton	20	39	.339	22½	NA
Oneida	22	13	.629	NA	Flanagan
Canandaigua	11	19	.367	NA	NA
Cortland	00	00	.000	NA	NA

Palmyra moved to Geneva in June; Ilion moved to Fulton July 10; Cortland disbanded July 18 (record unknown); Oneida disbanded July 25; Canandaigua disbanded July 27.

1906 Empire State League
schedule

Team standings	W	L	PCT	GB	Managers
Seneca Falls	48	32	.600	-	Edward McGuire
Geneva	47	32	.595	½	John Murray
Auburn	37	35	.514	7	Willard Hoagland
Oswego Starchmakers	40	38	.513	7	Larry Sutton / William Mackey
Fulton	30	45	.400	15½	John Stevenson
Penn Yan / Syracuse	20	40	.333	18	Manion / John O'Neil

Penn Yan (20–40) moved to Syracuse August 23; Syracuse folded before playing a game.

1907 Empire State League
schedule

Team standings	W	L	PCT	GB	Managers
Oswego Starchmakers	55	29	.655	-	Chauncer Elliot
Seneca Falls	56	32	.636	1	T.C. Doyle
Auburn	44	39	.530	10½	Willard Hoagland
Fulton	43	42	.506	12½	John Stevenson
Geneva	34	51	.400	21½	John Murray
Lyons	25	64	.281	32½	J.M. Flynn
