= Columbus Senators =

- 1888–1930; (1888, 1896–1930); Columbus, Ohio

Minor league affiliations
- Class: Double-A (1912–1930); Class A (1903–1911); Unclassified (1902); Class A (1901); Class B (1900); Class A (1896–1899); Unclassified (1888)
- League: American Association (1902–1930); Western Association (1901); Interstate League (1900); Western League (1896-1899); Tri-State League (1888)

Major league affiliations
- Team: Unaffiliated

Minor league titles
- League titles (3): 1905; 1906; 1907

Team data
- Name: Columbus Senators (1888, 1896–1930)
- Ballpark: Neil Park (1905–1930); Recreation Park (1888); Central Athletic Grounds (1896–1904)

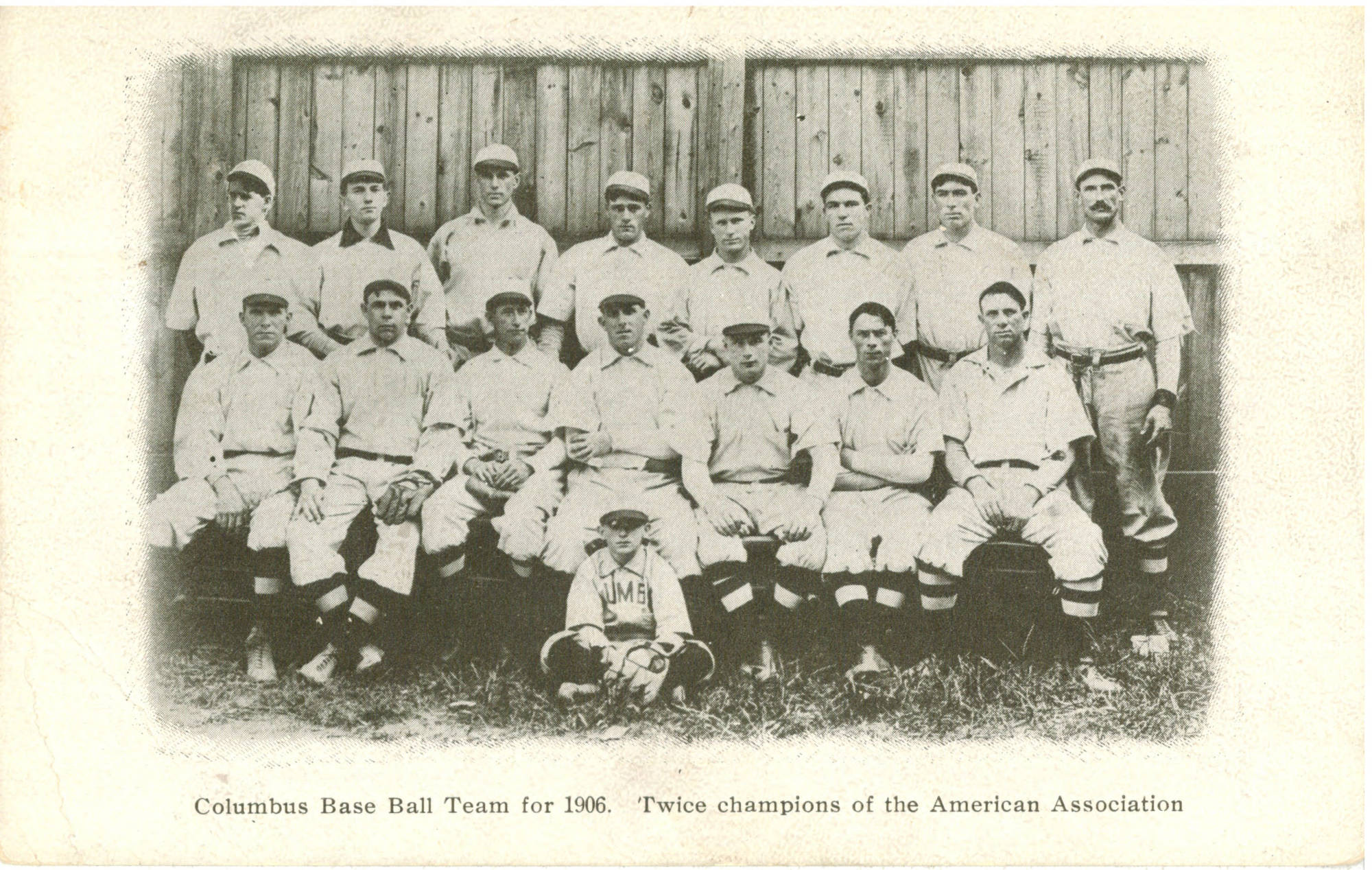
The 1906 Columbus Senators

The Columbus Senators Minor league baseball team was created in 1888 as a founding member of the Tri-State League. After that, the Senators played in the Western League (1896-1899), Interstate League (1900), Western Association (1901), and American Association (1902–1930). The team represented Columbus, Ohio, and played their home games at Recreation Park and Neil Park.

In their first season, the Senators finished in third place with a 64-50 record. The nickname was used again in 1897, when the Columbus team in the Western League changed its name from the Columbus Buckeyes to the Senators. Columbus competed until July 1899, when Loftus removed the team to Grand Rapids (see Grand Rapids (baseball) because of continued poor attendance. In 1900, Columbus also had a Senators club in the Interstate League, moving to the Western Association in 1901.

By 1902, the Senators became one of the founding members of the new American Association. Before the 1905 season, the team owner built Neil Park, the first concrete-and-steel stadium in the minor leagues. From 1905 through 1907, the Senators won the league title, losing the Junior World Series in 1906 and 1907. The team declined after that, and never finished higher than fourth place between 1919 and 1930. The 1905 Senators were recognized as one of the 100 greatest minor league teams of all time.

In 1931, the St. Louis Cardinals took control of the Columbus team as part of their developing minor league system and renamed them the Columbus Red Birds.

== Season-by-season records ==
Year	Record	Finish	Manager	League	Notes
1888	64–50	3rd	James Curry; Frank Arnold	TSL	
1896	52-90	7th	Tom Loftus	WL	
1897	89–47	2nd	George Tebeau	WL	
1898	73–60	5th	Tom Loftus; George Tebeau	WL	
1899	63–62	5th	Tom Loftus; George Tebeau	WL	
1900	58–78	6th	Bob Quinn	ISL	
1901	55–86	7th	Frank Metz; Jimmy Gardner; Ed Zinram	WA	
1902	58–78	6th	Frank Leonard; Jack Grim	AA	
1903	56–84	6th	Frank Leonard; Bob Quinn; Jimmy Bannon	AA	
1904	88–61	2nd	Bill Clymer	AA	
1905	100–52	1st	Bill Clymer	AA	Championship title
1906	91–57	1st	Bill Clymer	AA	Championship title Lost Junior World Series to the Buffalo Bisons
1907	90–64	1st	Bill Clymer	AA	Championship title Lost Junior World Series to the Toronto Maple Leafs
1908	86–68	3rd	Bill Clymer	AA	
1909	80–87	7th	Bill Clymer; Bill Friel	AA	
1910	88–77	3rd	Bill Friel	AA	
1911	87–78	3rd	Bill Friel	AA	
1912	98–68	3rd	Bill Friel	AA	
1913	93–74	4th	Bill Hinchman	AA	
1914	86–77	4th	Bill Hinchman	AA	
1915	54–91	8th	Rudy Hulswitt	AA	
1916	71–90	7th	Rudy Hulswitt; Bob Quinn; William Johns	AA	
1917	84–69	4th	Joe Tinker	AA	
1918	41–32	2nd	Joe Tinker	AA	
1919	70–84	6th	Grover Hartley	AA	
1920	66–99	7th	Bill Clymer	AA	
1921	69–96	8th	Pants Rowland	AA	
1922	63–102	8th	Pants Rowland	AA	
1923	79–89	4th	Carlton Molesworth	AA	
1924	75–93	7th	Carlton Molesworth	AA	
1925	61–106	8th	Carlton Molesworth	AA	
1926	39–125	8th	Hank Gowdy; George McQuillan	AA	
1927	60–108	8th	Ivey Wingo	AA	
1928	68–100	7th	Nemo Leibold	AA	
1929	75–91	6th	Nemo Leibold	AA	
1930	67–86	6th	Nemo Leibold	AA	

== Hall of Fame alumni ==
- Mordecai Brown (1917-1918)
- Rick Ferrell (1926-1928)
- Joe Tinker (1917)
- Dazzy Vance (1916)
- Rube Waddell (1899)
