= Gloversville-Johnstown Glovers =

- 1937–1951; Gloversville, New York

Minor league affiliations
- Previous classes: Class C
- League: Canadian–American League

Major league affiliations
- Previous teams: St. Louis Browns (1942, 1946–1949); Brooklyn Dodgers (1939)

Team data
- Previous names: Gloversville-Johnstown Glovers (1938–1942, 1946–1951); Gloversville Glovers (1937)
- Previous parks: Glovers Field

The Gloversville-Johnstown Glovers were a minor league baseball team based in Gloversville, New York and Johnstown, New York. They played in the Canadian–American League and were affiliated with the Brooklyn Dodgers (1939), Albany Senators (1940–1941) and St. Louis Browns (1942, 1946–1949).

The Gloversville Glovers were founded in 1937 but the team owner demanded money from the team to stay in Gloversville for 1938 and they didn't pay so he moved the team to Amsterdam, New York and they became the Amsterdam Rugmakers. The town leaders in Gloversville and Johnstown then bought the Brockville Blues for $400 and formed a new version of the team. This team lasted till 1951, though it took four years off during World War II.
