= Typewriter (disambiguation) =

A typewriter is a mechanical or electromechanical machine for typing characters.

Typewriter or Typewriters may also refer to:

- The Typewriter, a short composition of light music by Leroy Anderson
- Typewriter (TV series), an Indian web television series
- Ilion Typewriters, an American minor league baseball team
