= Can–Am (disambiguation) =

Can-Am, or CanAm, is an abbreviation of Canadian-American. It may refer to:

== Record labels ==
- Canadian-American Records, a record label founded in 1957

== Sports ==
=== Auto racing ===
- Can-Am Challenge Cup, known as "Can-Am", a former sports car racing series that ran from 1966 to 1987 in Canada and the United States
- Can-Am Speedway, a motorsports dirt track racing venue in La Fargeville, New York

=== Baseball ===
- Can–Am League, a former independent baseball league which played from 2005 to 2019
  - Can-Am Grays, a team in the league which played from 2005 to 2008
- Can–Am League (1936–1951), a former Class C baseball league which played from 1936 to 1951

=== Ice Hockey ===
- Canadian–American Hockey League, a league which operated between 1926 and 1936

=== Lacrosse ===
- Can-Am Lacrosse League, based in Southwestern Ontario and upstate New York

=== Soccer ===
- CanAm Conference, a part of the Women's Premier Soccer League

=== Wrestling ===
- Can-Am Connection, a tag team composed of Rick Martel and Tom Zenk in the World Wrestling Federation (WWF) through 1986 and 1987
- Can-Am Express, a tag team formed by Doug Furnas and Dan Kroffat (later replaced by Phil LaFon) that wrestled from 1989 to 1999
- Can-Am Wrestling School, a training school owned by the Ontario-based Border City Wrestling

== Other uses ==
- CanAm Highway, an international highway connecting Canada to the United States and Mexico, extending from La Ronge, Saskatchewan to El Paso, Texas
- Can-Am Center, an international study centre for Canada-US relations at the University of Maine
- Can-Am motorcycles, motorcycle manufacturer 1971-1987
- Can-Am Off-Road, revival of the motorcycle brand by Bombardier Recreational Products for motorcycles and all-terrain vehicles, 2007-present
  - Can-Am Spyder, a three-wheeled motorcycle manufactured since 2007 by Can-Am motorcycles
