= Cyclone Ryan =

Irish baseball player (1866–1917)

- First baseman / Pitcher
- Born: 1866; Cappawhite, Tipperary, Ireland
- Died: January 30, 1917 (aged 51); Medfield, Massachusetts, U.S.
- Batted: Unknown Threw: Right

MLB debut
- August 8, 1887, for the New York Metropolitans

Last MLB appearance
- May 8, 1891, for the Boston Beaneaters

MLB statistics
- Win–loss record: 0–1
- Earned run average: 0.00
- Batting average: .212
- Hits: 7
- At bats: 33
- Stats at Baseball Reference

Teams
- New York Metropolitans (1887); Boston Beaneaters (1891)

Daniel R. "Cyclone" Ryan (1866 – January 30, 1917) was an Irish born Major League Baseball pitcher and first baseman. Ryan played for New York Metropolitans and the Boston Beaneaters. He played in 9 games as a first baseman, and in 3 games as a pitcher.

He later managed the Palmyra/Johnstown Mormans.

Ryan was born in Cappawhite, Tipperary, Ireland and died in Medfield, Massachusetts.
