= Jesse Spring =

American professional player of ice hockey and baseball

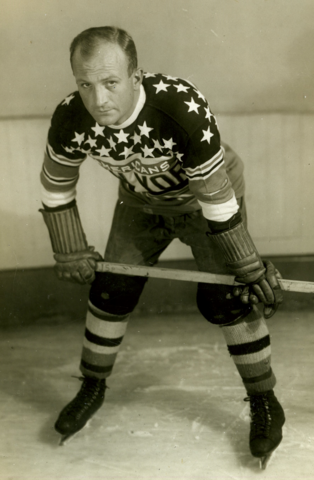
- Spring with the New York Americans in 1929
- Born: March 18, 1899 Alba, Pennsylvania, U.S.
- Died: March 25, 1942 (aged 43) Toronto, Ontario, Canada
- Height: 6 ft 0 in (183 cm)
- Weight: 185 lb (84 kg; 13 st 3 lb)
- Position: Defence
- Shot: Left
- Played for: NHL; Hamilton Tigers; New York Americans; Pittsburgh Pirates; Toronto Maple Leafs; IHL; Cleveland Indians; CAHL; New Haven Eagles; CPHL; Niagara Falls Cataracts
- Playing career: 1923–1932

Jesse Leonard Spring (March 18, 1899 – March 25, 1942) was an American-born Canadian professional athlete best known for playing six seasons in the National Hockey League (NHL); he also played several seasons in minor league baseball. He later was a coach in both sports.

== Biography ==
Spring was born in Alba, Pennsylvania, but grew up in Toronto, Ontario. He played junior and amateur ice hockey in Canada for De La Salle College, the Parkdale Canoe Club, and various senior amateur teams in the Toronto and Timmins areas before turning professional. He played in the National Hockey League (NHL) for the Hamilton Tigers, Pittsburgh Pirates, Toronto Maple Leafs and New York Americans. He went back to coach in the Ontario Hockey Association (OHA) after retiring as a player.

Spring also played professional baseball for several minor league teams between 1924 and 1928. He was player-manager of the Brockville Pirates in 1936.

Spring played for both the ice hockey Toronto Maple Leafs and the baseball Toronto Maple Leafs. In addition to playing two sports professionally, Spring played amateur lacrosse and gridiron football; he also was a boxer. Spring died in March 1942 in Toronto; he was survived by his wife and two daughters.

== Career statistics ==
=== Regular season and playoffs ===
			Regular season					Playoffs
Season	Team	League	GP	G	A	Pts	PIM	GP	G	A	Pts	PIM
1917–18	Toronto De La Salle	OHA Jr	—	—	—	—	—	—	—	—	—	—
1918–19	Parkdale Canoe Club	OHA Jr	—	—	—	—	—	—	—	—	—	—
1919–20	Toronto A.R. Clarke	TMHL	—	—	—	—	—	—	—	—	—	—
1920–21	Timmins Open Pit Miners	GBHL	—	—	—	—	—	—	—	—	—	—
1921–22	Toronto A.R. Clarke	TMHL	—	—	—	—	—	—	—	—	—	—
1922–23	Toronto A.R. Clarke	TMHL	—	—	—	—	—	—	—	—	—	—
1923–24	Hamilton Tigers	NHL	20	3	3	6	20	—	—	—	—	—
1924–25	Hamilton Tigers	NHL	29	2	1	3	11	—	—	—	—	—
1925–26	Pittsburgh Pirates	NHL	32	5	0	5	23	2	0	2	2	2
1926–27	Toronto Maple Leafs	NHL	2	0	0	0	0	—	—	—	—	—
1926–27	Niagara Falls Cataracts	Can-Am	10	0	0	0	15	—	—	—	—	—
1927–28	Niagara Falls Cataracts	Can-Am	39	1	3	4	57	—	—	—	—	—
1928–29	New York Americans	NHL	23	0	0	0	0	—	—	—	—	—
1928–29	New Haven Eagles	Can-Am	1	0	0	0	0	—	—	—	—	—
1928–29	Pittsburgh Pirates	NHL	5	0	0	0	2	—	—	—	—	—
1929–30	Pittsburgh Pirates	NHL	22	1	0	1	18	—	—	—	—	—
1930–31	Detroit Olympics	IHL	28	2	3	5	22	—	—	—	—	—
1931–32	Cleveland Indians	IHL	30	3	1	4	22	—	—	—	—	—
1932–33	Oshawa Blue Imps	OHA Sr	—	—	—	—	—	—	—	—	—	—
NHL totals			133	11	4	15	74	2	0	2	2	2
