= John Roach (baseball) =

American baseball player (1867–1934)

- Pitcher
- Born: November 19, 1867; North Bend, Pennsylvania, U.S.
- Died: April 2, 1934 (aged 66); Peoria, Illinois, U.S.
- Batted: Right Threw: Left

MLB debut
- May 14, 1887, for the New York Giants

Last MLB appearance
- May 14, 1887, for the New York Giants

MLB statistics
- Win–loss record: 0–1
- Earned run average: 11.25
- Strikeouts: 3
- Stats at Baseball Reference

Teams
- New York Giants (1887)

John F. Roach (November 19, 1867 – April 2, 1934) was a 19th-century American Major League Baseball player. In 1887 he pitched in a single game for the New York Giants. He also had an extensive minor league baseball career, that lasted from 1886 through 1898.

His brother, Mike Roach, also played in the Major Leagues with the Washington Senators in 1899.
