= Mike Roach =

American baseball player (1869–1916)

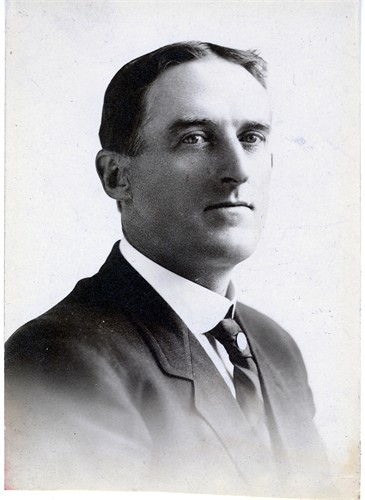
- Catcher
- Born: December 23, 1869; Driftwood, Pennsylvania, US
- Died: November 12, 1916 (aged 46); New York City, US
- Batted: Right Threw: Right

MLB debut
- August 10, 1899, for the Washington Senators

Last MLB appearance
- October 12, 1899, for the Washington Senators

MLB statistics
- Batting average: .218
- Home runs: 0
- Runs batted in: 7
- Stats at Baseball Reference

Teams
- Washington Senators (1899)

Michael Stephen Roach (December 23, 1869 – November 12, 1916) was an American professional baseball player who caught for the Washington Senators in 1899.

== Biography ==
Born in Driftwood, Pennsylvania, Roach was the son of William and Bridget Roach. Roach's brother, John Roach, pitched one game for the New York Giants in 1887.

Roach played in the minor leagues for 17 seasons. He made his professional baseball debut in 1892, and played for the Macon Central City and the Reading Actives that year. In 1893, he was one of the founders of the semi-professional [Susquehanna] River League made up of teams from Williamsport, Tyrone, Bellefonte, Lock Haven, Bloomsburg and Renovo. Roach was the catcher/manager of the Renovo team and led them to the championship in the league's only year of existence.

In 1894, he returned to the professional ranks by signing with the Pawtucket Maroons of the Class B New England League. The following year, Roach moved up the Toledo Swamp Angels/Terre Haute Hottentots of the Class A Western League. (The Toledo club moved to Terre Haute, Indiana in mid-season.) Roach was given credit for having a .341 batting average in 107 games for 1895. (That is highly suspect as Roach was normally a .250 hitter.)

He played with the Bangor Millionaires of the Class B New England League in 1896 and the Class B Atlantic League Hartford Connecticut club in 1897 and 1898. He replaced the manager of the Hartford club in mid-season 1898 after the manager left the team.

Roach was a member of the Newark club of the now Class A Atlantic League in 1899. When the Atlantic League folded in August, Roach was acquired by the Washington Senators of the National League. In 24 games for Washington, Roach hit .218, collecting 17 hits in 78 at bats. He performed capably behind the plate with a .952 fielding percentage. After the 1899 season, the National League contracted from 12 teams to eight, dropping Louisville, Cleveland, Baltimore, and Washington. This left Roach without a team. On March 5, 1900, Roach’s contract was sold to the Toronto Canucks of the Class A Eastern League. He would never play in the Major Leagues again.

In 1901, Roach was traded to the Class A Eastern League Syracuse club, which due to poor attendance, was moved to Brockton, Massachusetts in mid-season. In 1902, he signed to play for the Los Angeles Looloos, of the independent California League. In 1903, he returned East and played for the Columbus Senators of the Class A American Association. Over the winter he was traded to the Minneapolis Millers, also of the American Association. However he never played for them as he was injured during the spring and was released.

From 1904 to 1909 he played and managed in the Class B New York State League. First with the Ilion (New York) Typewriters. In 1905, the Ilion team was transferred to Wilkes-Barre, Pennsylvania. Roach was a fan favorite in Wilkes-Barre. However, the Wilkes-Barre management decided not to resign him for the following year and Roach joined the Binghamton Bingos.

From 1906 through 1909, Roach remained with the Binghamton club. In 1908 he became part-owner. During his two years of ownership, he was the business manager and a player-manager. A picture from the April 29, 1908, Binghamton Press, captioned "The Playing-Manager of the Bingo's" shows him with a glove on his left hand, proving that he threw right-handed. After the 1909 season, Roach sold his ownership interest and at the age of 39, retired from playing professional baseball.

After his playing days, he became a hotel proprietor in Binghamton, first running the McDonald Hotel and later the Cadillac Hotel. The McDonald Hotel was located at the corner of Lewis and Fayette Streets. It later was renamed the Hotel Chapman, then the Hotel Gregory. It was demolished in 1966 for urban renewal. Ironically, in 1992 Binghamton built a new baseball stadium near the location of the Hotel McDonald. The Cadillac Hotel located at 9 Main Street, still stands and (in 2022) is known as Fitzie's Pub.

On June 18,1912, Roach married Rosemary Manalis (McNelis) in Wilkes-Barre. They had two children, Louis and Rosemary.

On November 12, 1916, after a short illness, at the age of 46, Roach died at the home of his brother, Dr. Charles Roach, in New York City. He was buried in Drury Run Cemetery in Renovo, Pennsylvania.
