= Bill Pounds =

American baseball player (1878-1936)

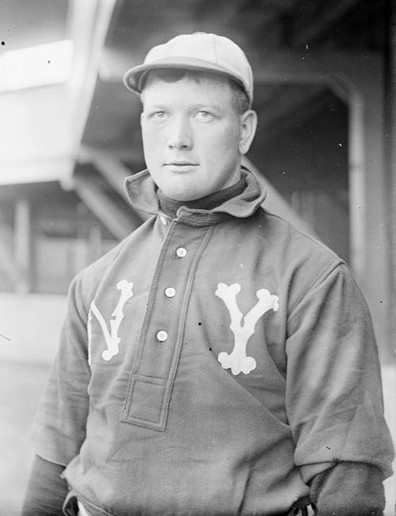
- Pitcher
- Born: March 11, 1878; Paterson, New Jersey, U.S.
- Died: July 7, 1936 (aged 58); Paterson, New Jersey, U.S.
- Batted: Right Threw: Right

MLB debut
- May 2, 1903, for the Cleveland Naps

Last MLB appearance
- June 30, 1903, for the Brooklyn Superbas

MLB statistics
- Win–loss record: 0-0
- Earned run average: 8.18
- Strikeouts: 4
- Stats at Baseball Reference

Teams
- Cleveland Naps (1903); Brooklyn Superbas (1903)

Jeared Wells "Bill" Pounds (March 11, 1878 – July 7, 1936) was an American pitcher in Major League Baseball. He appeared in just two major league games, one each for the Cleveland Naps and Brooklyn Superbas in 1903.

Bill Pounds was born in Paterson, New Jersey, and had a long career as a minor league pitcher. His professional career began in 1899 when he pitched for both Binghamton and Paterson. After a year out of organized baseball, he played in 1901 and 1902 for Ilion and Utica in the New York State League. After reportedly signing a contract to return to Utica for 1903, he was signed by Cleveland in the American League and was on their Opening Day roster. Pounds was brought in to pitch on May 2 in the fourth inning in Chicago when the White Stockings had opened up a big lead; he gave up seven runs (six earned) on eight hits in the 16-6 loss.

On May 18 he was released by Cleveland and was signed shortly thereafter by the New York Highlanders. Pounds was in uniform with the team when the Highlanders visited Chicago for a series May 20–22. A photographer from the Chicago Daily News was taking pictures of the players on the teams visiting both the American League and National League ballparks, and during this visit Pounds had his image preserved for posterity. Before the end of the month, without having appeared in a game for New York, Pounds was sent back to Cleveland, apparently because he could not come to terms on a contract. On June 4 he was signed by Brooklyn of the National League, but he did not appear in a game until June 30. With Pittsburgh ahead 12-0 after three innings, Pounds was sent in to pitch. He allowed five runs (four earned) in six innings on eight hits and two walks in the 17-8 loss, and gave up a long home run to Honus Wagner. On July 3, his contract was transferred to Baltimore of the Eastern League, along with that of Hughie Jennings and three other Dodgers. Pounds would never appear in another major league game; though his pitching record was unimpressive, he finished with a lifetime batting record of three hits in five at-bats.

Late in the 1903 season, his contract was purchased by Denver, but it is unclear whether he actually played in Colorado. For the remainder of his minor-league career, from 1904 through 1911, he pitched for teams within a couple of hundred miles of his birth—four teams in the New York State League and two in the Tri-State League. In the off-seasons he would sometimes pitch for the Paterson Elks team, and he continued to pitch for them after his minor-league career had ended. According to The Sporting Life, “Pounds has speed and a rather good assortment of curves. He has not the best control in the world.” A few years after his career had ended, the Utica Observer described him in this way: “Bill Pounds was the champion sweater of the league. He perspired so much that…a miniature lake (formed) around the slab.” By the late 1920’s, he had become the proprietor of a hotel in Paterson. He died in 1936 in the city of his birth, aged 58. Early in the 21st century, the photographic archives of the Chicago Daily News were posted online. Although his teammates’ photographs were easily identified, the image of Pounds remained unidentified, or occasionally misidentified as Doc Adkins, for at least a decade.
