= Daffin Backstrom =

American football and basketball coach

Biographical details
- Born: July 17, 1916; New York City, U.S.
- Died: July 15, 1993 (aged 76); Salina, Kansas, U.S.

Coaching career (HC unless noted)

Football
- 1962: Kansas Wesleyan

Basketball
- 1953–1963: Kansas Wesleyan

Baseball
- 1951: Drew

Head coaching record
- Overall: 1–7–1 (football); 78–141 (basketball); 10–6 (baseball)

Daffin Theodore "Swede" Backstrom (July 17, 1916 – July 15, 1993) was an American football, basketball, and baseball player and coach.

== Playing career ==
=== Drew University ===
Backstrom played college baseball and basketball at Drew University in Madison, New Jersey, where he is a member of the schools Athletic Hall of Fame.

=== Minor league baseball ===
Backstrom played in minor league baseball as a pitcher. In 1940 he was with the Akron Yankees in the Middle Atlantic League. Later that year and also in 1941 he played for Amsterdam Rugmakers in the Canadian–American League.

== Coaching career ==
=== Drew University ===
After graduating from Drew University and spending some time in the private sector, Backstrom returned to Drew to first be the assistant and later head baseball coach.

=== Kansas Wesleyan ===
Backstrom was the 14th head football coach at Kansas Wesleyan University in Salina, Kansas, serving for the 1962 season. His coaching record at Kansas Wesleyan was 1–7–1 (.167).

While at Kansas Wesleyan, Backstrom taught classes for the history department. In 1996, the school inducted him into their "Athletic Hall of Fame" for his coaching success. He was active as a coach and or administrator at the school from 1954 through 1963.

== Head coaching record ==
=== Football ===
Year	Team	Overall	Conference	Standing	Bowl/playoffs
Kansas Wesleyan Coyotes (Kansas Collegiate Athletic Conference) (1962)
1962	Kansas Wesleyan	1–7–1	1–7–1	T–8th	
Kansas Wesleyan:		1–7–1	1–7–1		
Total:		1–7–1			
