= Red Marion =

American baseball player (1914–1975)

- Outfielder
- Born: March 14, 1914; Richburg, South Carolina, U.S.
- Died: March 13, 1975 (aged 60); San Jose, California, U.S.
- Batted: Right Threw: Right

MLB debut
- September 16, 1935, for the Washington Senators

Last MLB appearance
- July 22, 1943, for the Washington Senators

MLB statistics
- Batting average: .179
- Home runs: 1
- Runs batted in: 2
- Stats at Baseball Reference

Teams
- Washington Senators (1935, 1943)

John Wyeth "Red" Marion (March 14, 1914 – March 13, 1975) was briefly an outfielder in American Major League Baseball and a longtime manager at the minor league level. A native of Richburg, South Carolina, he was the older brother of Marty Marion, the longtime star shortstop of the St. Louis Cardinals and former big league skipper.

While Marty played 13 years in the Major Leagues, Red Marion played in only 18 big-league games — four in 1935 and the remainder in 1943 — all for the Washington Senators. A right-handed batter and thrower, he collected five hits in 26 at-bats, for a .179 batting average. He had one double, one home run and two runs batted in.

But he would spend 19 seasons as a manager at the minor league level, beginning in 1940 with the Newport Canners of the Class D Appalachian League. He spent ten years (1946–55) as a pilot in the Boston Red Sox organization, beginning with the Oneonta Red Sox of the Class C Canadian–American League and ending with the Triple-A Louisville Colonels of the American Association. In 1956 he remained at the Louisville helm for a final half-season, even though the Red Sox no longer sponsored the Colonels. He also managed in the farm systems of the Senators and Los Angeles Angels, before retiring after the 1963 campaign.

His career minor league managing record was 1,352 victories and 1,224 defeats, a winning percentage of .525.

In 1975, Red Marion died the day before his 61st birthday in San Jose, California, where he had managed Red Sox and Angels farm teams in the 1950s and 1960s.
