= Bill Friel =

American baseball player (1876-1959)

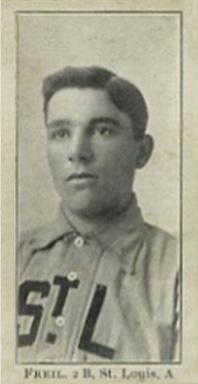
- Infielder / Outfielder
- Born: April 1, 1876; Renovo, Pennsylvania, U.S.
- Died: December 24, 1959 (aged 83); St. Louis, Missouri, U.S.
- Batted: Left Threw: Right

MLB debut
- May 3, 1901, for the Milwaukee Brewers

Last MLB appearance
- September 13, 1903, for the St. Louis Browns

MLB statistics
- Batting average: .245
- Home runs: 6
- Runs batted in: 80
- Stats at Baseball Reference

Teams
- Milwaukee Brewers/St. Louis Browns (1901–1903)

William Edward Friel (April 1, 1876 – December 24, 1959) was an American professional baseball player who played for seventeen seasons, including three in the major leagues, spending time at every position on the field. His brother was Pat Friel, who played in the major leagues for two years in the American Association.

Friel began his career in the minor leagues in 1895. In 1901, he played for the Milwaukee Brewers, and remained with the franchise in 1902-03 after it moved to St. Louis and became the Browns. He continued playing in the minor leagues until 1912, becoming the player-manager of the Columbus Senators of the American Association in 1910. He managed in the minor leagues for several more years afterwards. From 1923-1932 he served as the Business Manager for the St. Louis Browns. His last job in baseball was as the manager for the 1940 St. Augustine Saints of the Florida State League.
