= Joe Brown (third baseman) =

American baseball player (1902–1979)

- Third baseman
- Born: September 7, 1902; Buffalo, New York, U.S.
- Died: June 3, 1979 (aged 76); Irving, New York, U.S.
- Batted: Right Threw: Right
- Stats at Baseball Reference

Joseph Milton Brown (September 17, 1902 – June 3, 1979) was an American professional baseball player. A third baseman, he spent his career in minor league baseball from 1924 to 1937. He spent the majority of his career in the International League.

Brown was inducted in the International League Hall of Fame in 1962.
