= Willard Hoagland =

American baseball player, manager, and umpire

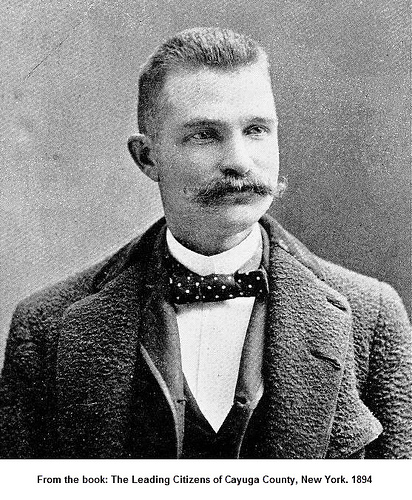
- Born: Willard A. Hoagland; 1862; Auburn, New York, U.S.
- Died: October 11, 1936 (aged 73–74); Auburn, New York, U.S.
- Occupation: Umpire
- Years active: 1894

Willard A. Hoagland (1862 – October 11, 1936) was an American professional baseball player, manager and umpire. He was also a racewalker and a prizefighter.

Hoagland umpired 27 National League games in 1894, 23 of them as the home plate umpire. Hoagland also played minor league baseball in the Empire State League in 1906. In 1908, he was described in a news article as owner and manager of the Auburn club in that league for two years.

He umpired in the Northwestern League in 1891 and 1892, and the South Atlantic League in 1910 and 1911.

Outside of baseball, Hoagland was also a racewalker and a prizefighter. In 1908, Hoagland was described as "long distance walking champion of America."

== Later life ==
Hoagland was a game protector in Cayuga County, New York for several years.
