= Bill Clymer =

American baseball player and manager (1873–1936)

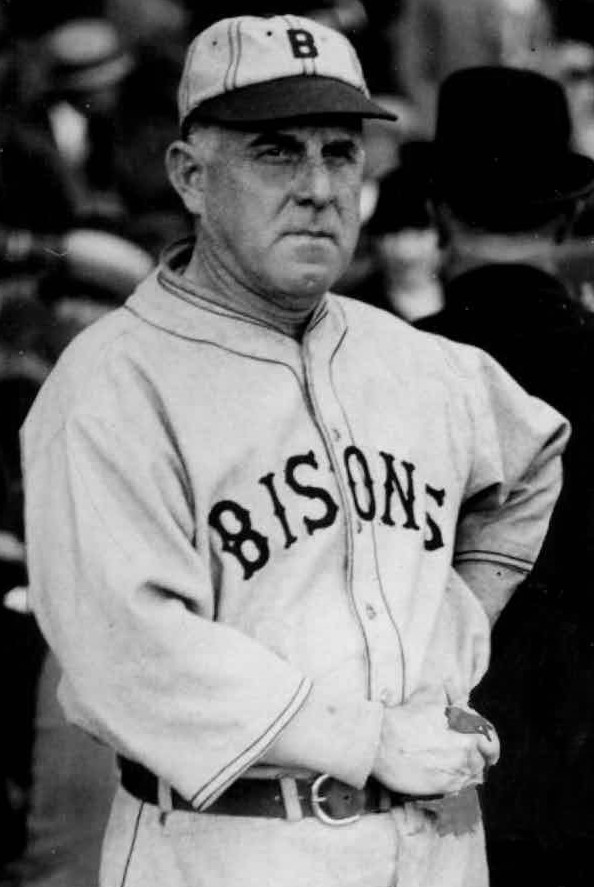
- Shortstop
- Born: December 18, 1873; Philadelphia, Pennsylvania, US
- Died: December 26, 1936 (aged 63); Philadelphia, Pennsylvania, US
- Batted: Unknown Threw: Unknown

MLB debut
- June 25, 1891, for the Philadelphia Athletics

Last MLB appearance
- June 27, 1891, for the Philadelphia Athletics

MLB statistics
- Batting average: .000
- Home runs: 0
- Runs batted in: 0
- Stats at Baseball Reference

Teams
- Philadelphia Athletics (1891)

William Johnston Clymer (December 18, 1873 – December 26, 1936) nicknamed "Derby Day Bill", was an American professional baseball player and manager. He played in Major League Baseball as a shortstop in 1891. After his playing career, Clymer became a successful minor league manager.

== Baseball career ==
At the age of 17, Clymer appeared in three games for the Philadelphia Athletics of the American Association. In 11 at-bats as a Major League player, he did not collect a hit, but did have one base on balls and one stolen base.

Clymer went on to play 18 seasons in the minor leagues (1891–1906) and was a minor league manager for approximately 29 years (1898–1932). He was the second minor league manager with more than 2,000 wins. Clymer died at the age of 63 in his hometown of Philadelphia, and is interred at North Cedar Hill Cemetery.
