= Nap Shea =

American baseball player (1874-1968)

- Catcher
- Born: May 23, 1874; Ware, Massachusetts, U.S.
- Died: July 8, 1968 (aged 94); Bloomfield Hills, Michigan, U.S.
- Batted: Right Threw: Right

MLB debut
- September 11, 1902, for the Philadelphia Phillies

Last MLB appearance
- September 15, 1902, for the Philadelphia Phillies

MLB statistics
- Games played: 3
- At bats: 8
- Hits: 1
- Stats at Baseball Reference

Teams
- Philadelphia Phillies (1902)

John Edward "Nap" Shea (May 23, 1874 – July 8, 1968), nicknamed "Napoleon", was an American catcher in Major League Baseball. He played for the Philadelphia Phillies in 1902. He stood at 5' 5", weighed 155 lbs., and batted and threw right-handed.

== Career ==
Shea was born in Ware, Massachusetts. He started his professional baseball career in 1894 and played for the New England League's Brockton Shoemakers for four seasons. In 1896, he batted a career-high .344 and slugged .452. Shea then played in the New York State League from 1899 to 1902. He hit .323 in 1901. Early in the following season, he was sidelined by appendicitis but then recovered and hit .300 for the Ilion Typewriters.

Shea was acquired by the Philadelphia Phillies and played three games for them in September. In 10 plate appearances, he went 1 for 8 with a walk and a hit by pitch. The next season, he caught for the Eastern League's Newark Sailors and stayed on that team for a few years. He batted under .200 during most of his time at Newark, but the Sporting Life wrote that he was "one of the best backstops" in the league.

Shea was sold to the Syracuse Stars in March 1908, and he played one season there before retiring from professional baseball. He died in 1968 in Bloomfield Hills, Michigan.
