= Howard Earl =

American baseball player (1869–1916)

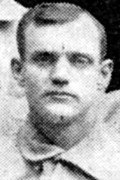
- Outfielder
- Born: February 25, 1869; Palmyra, New York, U.S.
- Died: December 23, 1916 (aged 47); North Bay, New York, U.S.
- Batted: Unknown Threw: Unknown

MLB debut
- April 19, 1890, for the Chicago Colts

Last MLB appearance
- September 27, 1891, for the Milwaukee Brewers

MLB statistics
- Batting average: .248
- Home runs: 8
- Runs batted in: 68
- Stats at Baseball Reference

Teams
- Chicago Colts (1890); Milwaukee Brewers (1891)

Howard J. Earl (February 25, 1869 – December 23, 1916), nicknamed "Slim Jim", was an American Major League Baseball outfielder. He played two seasons in the majors, a full season in 1890 for the Chicago Colts, and then 1891 for the Milwaukee Brewers, who were a midseason replacement team in the American Association.

Earl's minor league baseball career spanned 22 seasons, from 1886 with the Boston Blues of the New England League until 1907 with the Amsterdam-Gloversville-Johnstown Jags of the New York State League. From 1899 onward, he served as player-manager at each stop. During the latter part of his career he shifted from the outfield to first base.
