= Oneonta Red Sox =

- (1924, 1940–1942, 1946–1951); Oneonta, New York

Minor league affiliations
- Previous classes: Class C
- League: Canadian–American League (1940–1942, 1946–1951); New York–Pennsylvania League (1924)

Major league affiliations
- Previous teams: Boston Red Sox (1940–1941, 1946–1951)

Minor league titles
- League titles: 4 (1941, 1942, 1948, 1951)

Team data
- Previous names: Oneonta Red Sox (1946–1951); Oneonta Indians (1924, 1940–1942)
- Previous parks: Damaschke Field

The Oneonta Red Sox were a minor league baseball team based in Oneonta, New York.

The first incarnation of the team played in the first New York–Pennsylvania League in 1924. On August of that year, the Utica Utes relocated to Oneonta to finish their season as the Oneonta Indians. In Oneonta, the club posted an 18–22 record. However prior to the next season, the club relocated to Shamokin, Pennsylvania, to become the Shamokin Shammies.

The second incarnation of the team can be traced back to 1940 when the Can-Am League's Cornwall Maple Leafs relocated to Oneonta and played their home games at Damaschke Field. The club played until 1942 as the Oneonta Indians, winning league titles in 1941 and 1942. However the league suspended operation until 1946, due to World War II. However the team did reemerge that season as the Red Sox. Throughout its entire history the second incarnation of the club was affiliated with the Boston Red Sox.

Frank Malzone played third base for one season in Oneonta in 1949 before moving up the minor league system. The club then won two more titles, in 1948 and in the league's final season of 1951.

In 1966 a new Oneonta Red Sox team was established and played in the Class A New York–Penn League.

== Year-by-year record ==
Year	Record	Finish	Manager	Playoffs
1924	18-22	8th	Amby McConnell, Ben Egan & Roy Thomas	none
1940	62-63	5th	Lee Riley	
1941	78-46	1st	Red Barnes	League Champs
1942	68-56	4th	Red Barnes	League Champs
1946	68-54	4th	Red Marion	Lost in 1st round
1947	70-67	4th	Red Marion	Lost in 1st round
1948	72-65	3rd	Red Marion	League Champs
1949	75-62	2nd	Eddie Popowski	Lost League Finals
1950	86-52	3rd	Eddie Popowski	Lost in 1st round
1951	83-34	1st	Owen Scheetz	League Champs
