= Empire State League (1987) =

The Empire State League was an independent baseball league that operated for two seasons, the first on Long Island, the second on Staten Island.

The inaugural season began on July 2, 1987 and concluded on August 22, 1987. The league was founded by literary agent Jay Acton and Eric Margenau. The pair also owned several affiliated minor league baseball clubs in the New York–Penn League. The league sought to draw attention in the busy New York sports market by hiring four African American as managers. They were former major leaguers Paul Blair and George Scott as well as Bernardo Leonard and Brian Flood, nephew of major-leaguer Curt Flood. Scott's son, Dion Williams, a former minor leaguer, also played in the league for his father.

The four teams in the league took their names from Long Island's fishing industry. They were the Diggers (managed by Scott), the Reapers (managed by Leonard), the Whalers (managed by Flood) and the Sound (managed by Blair). About two weeks into the season, Flood was replaced by Mike DeSola.

The teams played 50 games in 50 days at Long Island's Hofstra University. The players were drawn from colleges across the United States and were paid $350 per month. The rosters included Joe Charno, Fairfield; Scott Waserfall, Fordham; Ron Brown, Cornell; Dave DePaul, Davidson; Tim Simms, Alabama; Jude Rinaldi, Troy State, Greg Polli, Hofstra; John Bilello, Hofstra; Ismael Rodriguez, Daemen; Vic Crema, Adelphi; Bobby Cassidy, Post; Mike Gianfrancesco, Post; Matt Dimakos, Buffalo; Keith Locklear, New York Tech; Paul DiGregorio, St. John's.

Acton, and his co-owner, Fraser Scott, the former middleweight boxer, signed two players from the Empire State League to the Watertown Pirates, of the NY-Penn League—Matt Dimakos and Pat Crosby. Later in the season, the San Jose Bees, of the California State League, signed a slew of players from the Empire State League, including Polli, Bilello, Rinaldo and Joe Mancini, who played three additional years in the minors.

Closed-league tryouts headed by Blair and Scott were held in the New York and New Jersey areas for prospective talent. Standouts included Ismael Rodriguez of the Bronx (Daemen College), John Blum (Concordia College), Joseph Ferrara (Concordia College) and Tony Tunno (Hofstra University) who threw upwards of 93 mph. Tunno and Ferrara were up and coming but injuries shortened their careers. Blum (Diggers) and Rodriguez (Sound) led their respective teams in hitting and both signed with the Toronto Blue Jays organization after the season concluded.

The Empire State League, although short in its tenure, drew recognition from some major league organizations.

With much of the talent from the league raided by other minor league teams, the season ended and the Whalers defeated the Diggers for the championships.

1987 Empire State League final standings

- Diggers 28–17
- Reapers 22–23
- Whalers 22–25
- Sound 19–26

The league moved to Staten Island for the 1988 season but folded after only two weeks of competition.
