= Dan Coogan =

American baseball player and coach (1875–1942)

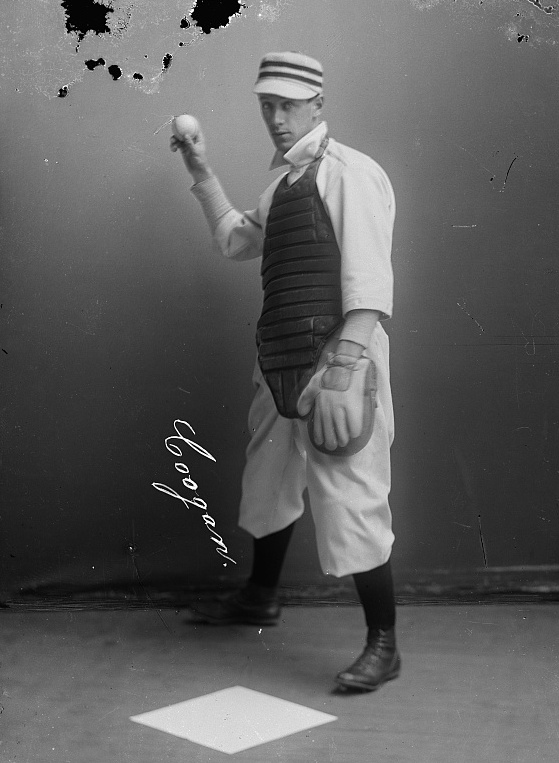
- Coogan photographed by C. M. Bell Studio
- Shortstop
- Born: February 16, 1875; Philadelphia, Pennsylvania, U.S.
- Died: October 28, 1942 (aged 67); Philadelphia, Pennsylvania, U.S.
- Batted: Unknown Threw: Right

MLB debut
- April 25, 1895, for the Washington Senators

Last MLB appearance
- August 8, 1895, for the Washington Senators

MLB statistics
- Batting average: .221
- Home runs: 0
- Runs batted in: 7
- Stats at Baseball Reference

Teams
- Washington Senators (1895)

Daniel George Coogan (February 16, 1875 – October 28, 1942) was an American baseball player and coach. After graduating from the University of Pennsylvania, he played professionally for 11 seasons, including one in Major League Baseball with the Washington Senators. He also coached several college teams during and after his playing career. He was 5 feet 8 inches (1.73 m) tall and weighed 128 pounds (58 kg).

== Early life ==
Coogan was born in Philadelphia, Pennsylvania, in 1875. His parents, John and Emma Coogan, died when he was young.

Coogan attended Girard College and played for the school's baseball team until he graduated in 1892. He then attended the University of Pennsylvania and was the baseball team's catcher from 1892 to 1894. During this time, he acquired the nickname "Little Danny Coogan" due to his small stature.

== Professional career ==
In 1895, Coogan graduated from the University of Pennsylvania and started his professional baseball career with the National League's Washington Senators. He played 26 games for the Senators, mostly as a shortstop, and batted .221 with seven runs batted in. Coogan then played in the minor leagues from 1896 to 1906. He had stints with several teams in the Eastern League and the New York State League.

Coogan coached the University of Pennsylvania's baseball team from 1904 to 1906. He coached at Cornell University from 1906 to 1913. He later coached at Bowdoin College and Georgetown University. During World War I, he was a physical director with the Canadian Army.

Coogan died in Philadelphia in 1942 and was buried in Holy Cross Cemetery.
