= Carlton Molesworth =

American baseball player (1876–1961)

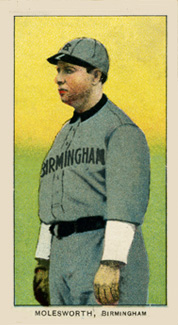
- Pitcher
- Born: February 15, 1876; Frederick, Maryland, U.S.
- Died: July 25, 1961 (aged 85); Frederick, Maryland, U.S.
- Batted: Left Threw: Left

MLB debut
- September 14, 1895, for the Washington Senators

Last MLB appearance
- September 30, 1895, for the Washington Senators

MLB statistics
- Win–loss record: 0–2
- Earned run average: 14.63
- Strikeouts: 7
- Stats at Baseball Reference

Teams
- Washington Senators (1895)

Carlton Molesworth (February 15, 1876 – July 25, 1961) was an American Major League Baseball pitcher. Molesworth played for the Washington Senators in the 1895 season. He played just four games in his career, having two losses in three games started with a 14.63 ERA.

Molesworth signed with the Birmingham Barons of the Southern Association in 1906 and was named manager of the team in 1908. His team opened Birmingham's gleaming new Rickwood Field in 1910 and he continued playing outfield until after the 1911 season, winning two pennants as manager in 1912 and 1914. He resigned from the Barons in 1922 and managed the Columbus Senators from 1923 to 1925. He also scouted for the Pittsburgh Pirates for 30 years.

Molesworth was born in and died in Frederick, Maryland.
