= Henry Fournier =

American baseball player (1865–1945)

- Pitcher
- Born: August 8, 1865; Syracuse, New York, U.S.
- Died: December 8, 1945 (aged 80); Eloise, Michigan, U.S.
- Batted: Unknown Threw: Left

MLB debut
- August 22, 1894, for the Cincinnati Reds

Last MLB appearance
- September 12, 1894, for the Cincinnati Reds

MLB statistics
- Win–loss record: 1–3
- Earned run average: 5.40
- Strikeouts: 5
- Stats at Baseball Reference

Teams
- Cincinnati Reds (1894)

Julius Henry Fournier (August 8, 1865 – December 8, 1945) was an American pitcher in Major League Baseball. He played for the Cincinnati Reds in 1894.
