= Larry Battam =

American baseball player (1876–1938)

- Third baseman
- Born: May 1, 1876; Brooklyn, New York, U.S.
- Died: January 27, 1938 (aged 61); Brooklyn, New York, U.S.
- Batted: Unknown Threw: Unknown

MLB debut
- September 28, 1895, for the New York Giants

Last MLB appearance
- September 30, 1895, for the New York Giants

MLB statistics
- Batting average: .250
- Home runs: 0
- Runs batted in: 0
- Stats at Baseball Reference

Teams
- New York Giants (1895)

Lawrence Battam (May 1, 1876 – January 27, 1938) was an American professional baseball player who played third base in the Major Leagues for the 1895 New York Giants. His minor league career stretched through 1903.
