= Pete O'Brien (1900s second baseman) =

American baseball player (1877–1917)

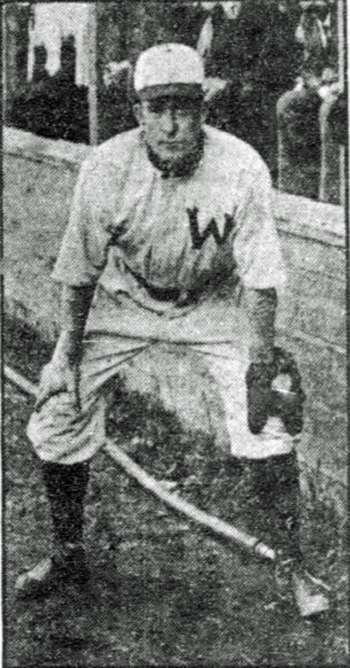
- Second baseman
- Born: June 17, 1877; Binghamton, New York, U.S.
- Died: January 31, 1917 (aged 39); Jersey City, New Jersey, U.S.
- Batted: Left Threw: Right

MLB debut
- September 17, 1901, for the Cincinnati Reds

Last MLB appearance
- October 2, 1907, for the Washington Senators

MLB statistics
- Batting average: .223
- Home runs: 3
- Runs batted in: 78
- Stats at Baseball Reference

Teams
- Cincinnati Reds (1901); St. Louis Browns (1906); Cleveland Naps (1907); Washington Senators (1907)

Peter J. O'Brien (June 17, 1877 – January 31, 1917) was an American Major League Baseball second baseman who played for three seasons. He played for the Cincinnati Reds in 1901, the St. Louis Browns in 1906, and the Cleveland Naps and Washington Senators in 1907.
