= Ed Householder =

American baseball player (1869-1924)

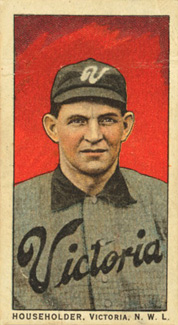
- Outfielder
- Born: October 12, 1869; Pittsburgh, Pennsylvania, U.S.
- Died: July 3, 1924 (aged 54); Los Angeles, California, U.S.
- Batted: Left Threw: Left

MLB debut
- April 17, 1903, for the Brooklyn Superbas

Last MLB appearance
- April 30, 1903, for the Brooklyn Superbas

MLB statistics
- Batting average: .209
- Home runs: 0
- Runs batted in: 9
- Stats at Baseball Reference

Teams
- Brooklyn Superbas (1903)

Edward H. Householder (October 12, 1869 – July 3, 1924) was an American outfielder in Major League Baseball. He played for the Brooklyn Superbas in 1903. He stood at 5 ft 9 in (1.75 m) and weighed 180 lb.

== Career ==
Householder was born in Pittsburgh, Pennsylvania, and started his professional baseball career in 1897 in the New York State League. He then spent most of 1898 with the Eastern League's Buffalo Bisons and batted .312 in 102 games. The following season, he also played for Buffalo but then moved to the Rochester Bronchos in July. Householder hit .350 over the final two months and helped Rochester win the EL pennant. In 1900, he continued to put up big numbers and drove in 94 runs, which was the seventh-best total in the league.

Householder slumped in 1901. He started the year in the Illinois–Indiana–Iowa League but hit just .221 and then moved to the California League, where he hit .298. In 1902, he returned to form with a .308 batting average and 220 hits over the long California League season. This earned him a shot in the major leagues, and he made his MLB debut on April 17 for the Brooklyn Superbas. Householder was Brooklyn's center fielder for the next two weeks. He went 9 for 43 (.209) at the plate, with 9 runs batted in and 3 stolen bases. His OPS+ was just 31. He played his final MLB game on April 30 and then finished out the campaign with minor league teams in Los Angeles, California, and Little Rock, Arkansas, batting over .300 with both.

After spending 1904 with the Little Rock Travelers, Householder returned to the west coast, where he would stay for the rest of his career. He batted under .300 in 1905 and 1906 in the Pacific Coast League and then moved to the Aberdeen Black Cats of the Northwestern League. Householder had probably his best statistical season in 1907, when he was 37 years old. He won his first batting title with a .347 batting average and also led the entire league in slugging percentage, total bases, and doubles. He played with Aberdeen again in 1908 and then made stops in Fresno, Santa Cruz, Vancouver, and Victoria.

After batting .312 in 1911, Householder retired from professional baseball. He ended his 15-year minor league career with a .295 batting average and a total of 1,826 hits. Householder died of stomach cancer in 1924.
