= Bill Gannon (baseball) =

American baseball player (1873–1927)

- Outfielder
- Born: March 17, 1873; New Haven, Connecticut, U.S.
- Died: April 26, 1927 (aged 54); Fort Worth, Texas, U.S.
- Batted: Unknown Threw: Unknown

MLB debut
- September 9, 1901, for the Chicago Orphans

Last MLB appearance
- October 6, 1901, for the Chicago Orphans

MLB statistics
- Batting average: .148
- Home runs: 0
- Runs batted in: 0
- Stats at Baseball Reference

Teams
- Chicago Orphans (1901)

William Patrick Gannon (March 17, 1873 – April 26, 1927) was an American right fielder in Major League Baseball. He committed suicide in Fort Worth, Texas.

== Major League career ==
Gannon made his debut on September 9, 1901, at age 28. He appeared in 15 games. He collected 9 hits in 61 at-bats, scored 2 runs, and drew a base on balls 1 time. He hit no home runs. He had a batting average of .148 and a fielding percentage of 1.000.

== Sources ==
- Career statistics from Baseball Reference · Baseball Reference (Minors) · Retrosheet · Baseball Almanac
