= Smiths Falls Beavers =

Canadian professional baseball team

The Smiths Falls Beavers were a professional baseball team that played for one season in 1937, in Smiths Falls, Ontario.

The team played as part of the Canadian–American League. Two players from the single-season team made it to the major leagues. Matt Christopher, the well-known author of over a hundred sports books for young adults, made the team out of training camp, but was released early in the season.

Ballpark: Canadian Pacific Recreation Grounds

Team Members included:

- Xavier Rescigno (p)
- Walt Lanfranconi (p)
- Art Horsington (p)
- Andy Palau (c)
- Al Smith (2b)
- Ernie Downer (cf)
- Matt Christopher (3b)

== Canadian–American League, 1937 ==
Team	Games Played
Brockville Pirates	100
Rome Colonels	102
Ogdensburg Colts	105
Smiths Falls Beavers	106
Perth-Cornwall Bisons	108
Oswego Netherlands	108
Ottawa Braves	110
Gloversville Glovers	111
