= Fred Donovan =

American baseball player and manager (1864–1916)

- Catcher
- Born: July 4, 1864; Epping, New Hampshire, U.S.
- Died: March 7, 1916 (aged 51); Springfield, Illinois, U.S.
- Batted: Right Threw: Right

MLB debut
- June 23, 1895, for the Cleveland Spiders

Last MLB appearance
- July 6, 1895, for the Cleveland Spiders

MLB statistics
- Games played: 3
- At bats: 12
- Hits: 1
- Stats at Baseball Reference

Teams
- Cleveland Spiders (1895)

Frederick Maurice Donovan (July 4, 1864 – March 7, 1916) was an American professional baseball catcher and manager. He played in Major League Baseball for the Cleveland Spiders in 1895.

== Career ==
Donovan was born in Epping, New Hampshire, in 1864. He started his professional baseball career in 1894 with the New England League's Bangor Millionaires. The following year, he played for the National League's Cleveland Spiders. In three games, he went 1 for 12 at the plate with 1 run batted in and 1 walk. That was the only time Donovan would appear in the major leagues. He returned to the New England League in 1896, played in the Interstate League from 1897 to 1899, and then went to the New York State League until 1902. He was married to Sarah Criswell Fulkerson in 1897.

In 1903, Donovan became the regular catcher for the Bloomington Bloomers of the Illinois–Indiana–Iowa League. He appeared in over 100 games each year from 1903 to 1905 and posted batting averages of .156, .228, and .236. In 1904, he set his career-high for hits in a season, with 97. He then played for the Springfield Senators from 1907 to 1909. In 1911, he became a player-manager for the Illinois–Missouri League's Taylorville Christians. At the ages of 46 and 47, he played 63 games, batted .181, and managed Taylorville to a last-place finish. He also served as the first professional baseball manager of Hall of Famer Ray Schalk.

Donovan's baseball career ended in 1912. He died in Springfield, Illinois, in 1916 and was buried in Oak Ridge Cemetery.
