= Grant Thatcher =

American baseball player (1877-1936)

- Pitcher
- Born: February 23, 1877; Maytown, Pennsylvania, U.S.
- Died: March 17, 1936 (aged 59); Lancaster, Pennsylvania, U.S.
- Batted: Switch Hitter Threw: Right

MLB debut
- September 9, 1903, for the Brooklyn Superbas

Last MLB appearance
- April 24, 1904, for the Brooklyn Superbas

MLB statistics
- Win–loss record: 4–1
- Earned run average: 3.16
- Strikeouts: 13
- Stats at Baseball Reference

Teams
- Brooklyn Superbas (1903–1904)

Ulysses Grant Thatcher (February 23, 1877 – March 17, 1936) was an American right-handed pitcher in Major League Baseball in the United States.

== Biography ==
Born in Maytown, Pennsylvania on February 23, 1877, Thatcher pitched in five games for the Brooklyn Superbas during the 1903 and 1904 baseball seasons, making four starts, and acquiring a 4–1 record with a 3.16 earned run average during his appearances.

Thatcher had an unusual end to his Major League career. When the Superbas attempted to play a second Sunday home game on April 24 against the Philadelphia Phillies, the club was tipped off that the pitcher, catcher and hitter at the start of the game would be arrested. Thus three "decoys" were inserted at the start of the game, with Ed Poole being replaced by Thatcher after Poole's arrest.

== Death ==
Thatcher died at the age of fifty-nine in Lancaster, Pennsylvania on March 17, 1936.
