= Cornwall Bisons =

Minor League Baseball team

The Cornwall Bisons was a Minor League Baseball club that played in the Class-C Canadian–American League during the 1938 season. The team was based in Cornwall, Ontario, and played its home games at Cornwall Athletic Grounds.

Cornwall served as farm club of the Buffalo Bisons, a member of the original International League. At the time, a few lower minor league clubs, e.g., classes A, B, C and D, were affiliated to Double-A and Triple-A teams, the highest level of play in the Minor Leagues.

Managed by Steve Yerkes, the Cornwall Bisons finished in second place with a 74-47 record in the eight-team league, and later defeated the Amsterdam Rugmakers, two to one games, in the final round of the playoffs.

In 1939, the team became an affiliate of the Toronto Maple Leafs, also a member of the International League, and was renamed as the Cornwall Maple Leafs.

This time, Cornwall ended in fourth place with a 62-56 record and lost the first round of the playoffs. Yerkes repeated as their manager, but was replaced by Emil Graff during the midseason. Players included outfielders Frank Colman and Whitey Platt, as well as pitchers Dick Fowler and Phil Marchildon.
