= Brockville Blues =

Defunct minor league baseball team in Canada

- 1936–1937; Brockville, Ontario

Minor league affiliations
- Class: Class C
- League: Canadian–American League

Major league affiliations
- Team: Boston Red Sox (1937)

Team data
- Name: Brockville Blues (1937); Brockville Pirates (1936)
- Ballpark: Fulford Athletic Field

The Brockville Blues were a minor league baseball team based in Brockville, Ontario, Canada. The team competed in the Canadian–American League for two seasons. In 1936, they were known as the Brockville Pirates and were not affiliated with any major league team. In 1937, they played as the Blues and were a farm team of the Boston Red Sox.

Brockville had previously fielded a minor league team in 1888, in the Eastern International League.

Jesse Spring, the team's player-manager in 1936, was best known as a professional ice hockey player, having spent six seasons in the National Hockey League (NHL).

== Results by season ==
Season	Nickname	Affiliation	Record (win %)	Finish	Manager	Playoffs (games)	Attendance	Ref.
1936	Pirates	—	43–36 (.544)	3rd of 6	Jesse Spring	defeated Ottawa Senators (3–1) lost to Perth Royals (0–3)	unknown	
1937	Blues	Boston Red Sox	30–69 (.303)	7th of 8	Jesse Spring; John Grilli	—	6,242	
