= Amsterdam Rugmakers =

The Amsterdam Rugmakers were a Canadian–American League baseball team based in Amsterdam, New York, USA, that played from 1938 to 1942 and from 1946 to 1951. They played their home games at Mohawk Mills Park (now Shuttleworth Park) and were affiliated with the New York Yankees during their entire existence.

The team won one league championship, in 1940 under manager Eddie Sawyer.

Vic Raschi, Lew Burdette, Spec Shea, Gus Triandos, John Blanchard, Joe Collins, Karl Drews, Bob Grim, Torbert MacDonald, and Daffin Backstrom all played for the Rugmakers.
