= 2026 PGCBL season =

15th annual season of Perfect Game Collegiate Baseball League

- League: Perfect Game Collegiate Baseball League
- Sport: Baseball
- Duration: May 29 – July 26 (Playoffs: July 27 – July 31)
- Games: 44 (352 games in total)
- Teams: 16

East Division

West Division

Perfect Game Collegiate Baseball League Championship
- Champions: Batavia Muckdogs
- Runners-up: Utica Blue Sox

Seasons
- ← 2025 2027 →

The 2026 PGCBL season was the 15th season of collegiate summer baseball in the Perfect Game Collegiate Baseball League (PGCBL), a collegiate summer baseball league within the state of New York and one team in the province of Ontario, Canada, since its creation in 2010. There are 16 PGCBL teams.

The Saugerties Stallions entered the season as defending champions, having defeated the Batavia Muckdogs, two games to zero, in the league's 2025 championship series.

The Muckdogs defeated the Utica Blue Sox in the championship game 13–3 to win their first PGCBL championship.

== Season schedule ==
The league is scheduled to operate with sixteen teams during the 2026 season.

It was announced during the offseason that the Olean Oilers, whose previous franchise iteration was a professional Class D minor league affiliate that played in the New York–Penn League, was leaving the New York Collegiate Baseball League (NYCBL) to join the league.

The season will be played with a 44-game schedule, with the regular season starting on May 29 and concluding on July 26. The top four teams in each division will qualify for the playoffs that start on July 27.

== Regular season standings ==
East Division Regular Season Standings
Pos	Team	G	W	L	T	Pct.	GB
1	y-Amsterdam Mohawks	41	34	6	1	.841	--
2	x-Saugerties Stallions	36	25	11	0	.694	7.0
3	x-Utica Blue Sox	43	25	18	0	.581	10.5
4	x-Oneonta Outlaws	38	16	21	1	.434	16.5
5	Mohawk Valley Diamond Dawgs	41	17	24	0	.415	17.5
6	Glens Falls Dragons	41	13	28	0	.317	21.5
7	Boonville Lumberjacks	38	8	30	0	.211	25.0

West Division Regular Season Standings
Pos	Team	G	W	L	T	Pct.	GB
1	y-Batavia Muckdogs	40	29	10	1	.738	--
2	x-Jamestown Tarp Skunks	38	25	11	2	.684	2.5
3	x-Elmira Pioneers	37	20	17	0	.541	8.0
4	x-Auburn Doubledays	39	21	18	0	.538	8.0
5	Olean Oilers	38	20	18	0	.526	8.5
6	Niagara Ironbacks	39	19	18	2	.513	9.0
7	Geneva Red Wings	38	15	22	1	.408	13.0
8	Niagara Falls Americans	41	13	28	0	.317	17.0
9	Newark Pilots	34	7	27	0	.206	19.5

- y – Clinched division
- x – Clinched playoff spot

== Statistical leaders ==
=== Hitting ===
Stat	Player	Team	Total
HR			
AVG			
RBIs			
SB			

=== Pitching ===
Stat	Player	Team	Total
W			
ERA			
SO			
SV			

== Awards ==
=== All-star selections ===
==== East Division ====
Hitters
Position	Player	Team
C	Vincent Duffy	Oneonta
C	Joe Crenshaw	Mohawk Valley
C	Cooper Schmidt	Saugerties
IF	Gabriel Rivera	Amsterdam
IF	Robert Melo	Amsterdam
IF	TJ Worth	Glens Falls
IF	Connor Scanlon	Mohawk Valley
IF	Byron Arias	Mohawk Valley
IF	Tyler Correa	Amsterdam
IF	Steven Ramirez	Saugerties
IF	Aiden Schmidt	Saugerties
IF	Xavier Smith	Utica
IF	Anthony Perritano	Utica
OF	Jake Haarde	Mohawk Valley
OF	Erick Diaz	Mohawk Valley
OF	Aiden Dill	Amsterdam
OF	Andrew Ezell	Amsterdam
OF	Jordan Perry	Amsterdam
OF	Jack Sweeney	Amsterdam
OF	Mason Gazzaway	Saugerties
DH/UTIL	PJ Strand	Oneonta
DH/UTIL	Taylor Belza	Amsterdam
DH/UTIL	Michael Clarkson	Boonville

Pitchers
Position	Player	Team
P	Colin Richardson	Glens Falls
P	Jaxson Baptist	Boonville
P	Braeden Johnson	Oneonta
P	Matt Murtaugh	Saugerties
P	Brandon Shea	Amsterdam
P	John Rigas	Utica
P	Brandon Lynn	Mohawk Valley
P	Warren Miller	Amsterdam

==== West Division ====
Hitters
Position	Player	Team
C	Josh Bullock	Niagara
C	Jonathan Griggs	Auburn
C	Cooper Romich	Batavia
IF	Evan Brock	Batavia
IF	Eric Weeks	Jamestown
IF	Darek Staudt	Olean
IF	Michael Gregus	Niagara
IF	JC Gamble	Geneva
IF	Jackson Inman	Batavia
IF	Cooper Martin	Niagara
IF	Thomas Bates	Olean
IF	Tito Kiefer	Jamestown
OF	Jordan Gallo	Niagara
OF	Glen Brooks	Batavia
OF	Jalen David	Batavia
OF	Teddy Monahan	Auburn
OF	Brett Baker	Elmira
OF	Grant Moore	Jamestown
OF	Matthew Ganschow	Niagara Falls
OF	Dominic Zangardi	Niagara Falls
DH/UTIL	Michael DeRosa	Newark
DH/UTIL	David Harris	Niagara Falls
DH/UTIL	Anderson Fenwick	Niagara

Pitchers
Position	Player	Team
P	Eric Woodley	Batavia
P	Chase Beran	Jamestown
P	Gavin Chandler	Batavia
P	Garrett Beaver	Batavia
P	Dylan Miles	Niagara
P	Jason Santos	Jamestown
P	Brendan Hayes	Elmira
P	Landen Burch	Elmira
P	Matt Chofy	Auburn
P	Mason Davey	Batavia
P	Larsen Burch	Elmira
P	Max Lipton	Geneva
P	Luke Richards	Elmira

=== End of year awards ===
Award	Player	Team
Player of the Year		
Pitcher of the Year		
Coach of the Year		

== Playoffs ==
=== Format ===
The top four teams from each division will make the postseason. The league semifinals and finals are one-game playoffs. The two division champions were originally scheduled to play a three-game playoff for the league championship but it was changed to a one-game playoff due to weather.

The following will be used as tiebreaking procedure:

1. Head-to-Head record

2. Record against other playoff teams

3. Number of first inning runs scored throughout the season

4. Coin toss

=== Playoff bracket ===
First Round
1	Amsterdam Mohawks	5
4	Oneonta Outlaws	2
2	Saugerties Stallions	3
3	Utica Blue Sox	5
↑ East / ↓ West
1	Batavia Muckdogs	12
4	Auburn Doubledays	1
2	Jamestown Tarp Skunks	8
3	Elmira Pioneers	0

Division Championship Round
1	Amsterdam Mohawks	2
3	Utica Blue Sox	10
1	Batavia Muckdogs	6
2	Jamestown Tarp Skunks	4

Perfect Game Collegiate Baseball League Championship
3	Utica Blue Sox	1
1	Batavia Muckdogs	13

== See also ==
- 2026 Appalachian League season
- 2026 FCBL season
- 2026 Major League Baseball season
- 2026 Northwoods League season
- 2026 Prospect League season
