= 2021 PGCBL season =

10th season of Perfect Game Collegiate Baseball League

- League: Perfect Game Collegiate Baseball League
- Sport: Baseball
- Duration: June 3 – July 29 (Playoffs: July 30 – August 3)
- Games: 35 – 45 (48; Max # of games)
- Teams: 15

East Division
- League champions: Amsterdam Mohawks

Central Division
- League champions: Utica Blue Sox

West Division
- League champions: Jamestown Tarp Skunks

Perfect Game Collegiate Baseball League Championship
- Champions: Saugerties Stallions
- Runners-up: Amsterdam Mohawks
- Finals MVP: Josh Stevenson

Seasons
- ← ~~2020~~ 2022 →

The 2021 PGCBL season is the tenth season of the Perfect Game Collegiate Baseball League, a wood bat collegiate summer baseball league. The league's first since the 2019 season after the 2020 season was canceled due to the COVID-19 pandemic.

The league split into three divisions of East, Central, and West of five, four (five including Adirondack), and six teams respectively. The league added the Batavia Muckdogs, Auburn Doubledays, and Niagara Power during the off-season. However the day prior to the regular season beginning, due to COVID-19 complications the Adirondack Trail Blazers canceled their season. Thus lowering the league to 15 teams for the season and the Central division from five teams to four. Also, the Jamestown Jammers officially rebranded as the Jamestown Tarp Skunks starting in the 2021 season. While there was supposed to be 48 games for every team in the league, not all of them were played due to rainouts or cancellations.

== Regular season standings ==
Current through July 29, 2021.

East Division Regular Season Standings
Pos	Team	G	W	L	Pct.	GB
1	y – Amsterdam Mohawks	40	31	9	.768	--
2	x – Saugerties Stallions	39	27	12	.692	3.5
3	e – Albany Dutchmen	42	21	21	.500	11.0
4	e – Oneonta Outlaws	35	14	21	.403	14.5
5	e – Glens Falls Dragons	42	7	35	.167	25.0

Central Division Regular Season Standings
Pos	Team	G	W	L	Pct.	GB
1	y – Utica Blue Sox	41	24	17	.585	--
2	x – Auburn Doubledays	45	26	19	.578	--
3	e – Mohawk Valley DiamondDawgs	42	23	19	.548	1.5
4	e – Watertown Rapids	42	13	29	.310	11.5

West Division Regular Season Standings
Pos	Team	G	W	L	Pct.	GB
1	y – Jamestown Tarp Skunks	43	28	15	.651	--
2	x – Geneva Red Wings	41	23	18	.561	4.0
3	e – Batavia Muckdogs	41	22	19	.537	5.0
4	e – Elmira Pioneers	38	17	21	.447	8.5
5	e – Niagara Power	45	19	26	.422	10.0
6	e – Newark Pilots	38	12	26	.316	13.5

- As of July 29, 2021.
- y – Clinched division
- x – Clinched playoff spot
- e – Eliminated from playoff contention

== Statistical leaders ==
as of July 29, 2021

=== Hitting ===
Stat	Player	Team	Total
HR	Matt Shaw	Amsterdam Mohawks	9
AVG	Griffin O’Ferrall	Auburn Doubledays	0.404
H	Griffin O’Ferrall	Auburn Doubledays	61
RBIs	Kyle Schmack	Utica Blue Sox	34
SB	Harris Williams	Utica Blue Sox	30

=== Pitching ===
Stat	Player	Team	Total
W	Justin Guiliano	Jamestown Tarp Skunks	7
ERA	Nick Smith	Amsterdam Mohawks	1.51
SO	Christopher Grome	Glens Falls Dragons	56
SV	Matt Henson	Jamestown Tarp Skunks	11

== Playoffs ==
Playoff Seeding Standings
Pos	Team	G	W	L	Pct.	GB
1	Amsterdam Mohawks	40	31	9	.768	--
2	Saugerties Stallions	39	27	12	.692	3.5
3	Jamestown Tarp Skunks	43	28	15	.651	4.5
4	Utica Blue Sox	41	24	17	.585	7.5
5	Auburn Doubledays	45	26	19	.578	7.5
6	Geneva Red Wings	41	23	18	.561	8.5

=== Description of playoffs ===
The postseason for the 2021 season includes a playoff field of six teams, where the two teams with the best records would get a bye for the first round. The quarter-final round is a one-game playoff series where the 4th seed hosts the 5th seed and the 3rd seed hosts the 6th seed. The semi-final round is a one-game playoff series where the 1st seed will host the winner of the 4th and 5th seed series, and the 2nd seed will host the winner of the 3rd and 6th seed series. Finally, in the PGCBL Championship series, it is a best of 3 series between the two remaining teams from the semi-final round with the higher seed hosting game 1 and 3 (if necessary) and the lower seed hosting game 2.

=== Playoff bracket ===
Quarter-Final Round: Jul. 30
4	Utica Blue Sox	0
5	Auburn Doubledays	7
3	Jamestown Tarp Skunks	3
6	Geneva Red Wings	4

Semi-Final Round: Jul. 31
1	Amsterdam Mohawks	7
5	Auburn Doubledays	1
2	Saugerties Stallions	8
6	Geneva Red Wings	2

PGCBL Championship Series: Aug. 1 – 3
1	Amsterdam Mohawks	0
2	Saugerties Stallions	2

== See also ==
- Perfect Game Collegiate Baseball League
