= Utica Brewmasters =

The Utica Brewmasters played in the New York State League in 2007. They played their games on Murnane Field at Donovan Stadium in Utica, New York and were managed by former MLB player Dave Cash, a Utica native.
