= Donovan Stadium at Murnane Field =

Stadium in Utica, New York, U.S.

Coordinates: 43.090193°N 75.261616°W

Donovan Stadium is a stadium in Utica, New York. It is primarily used for baseball and was formerly the home of Utica Blue Sox. The ballpark has a capacity of 4,000 people and opened in 1976. The movement to remodel the field started in 1967 in effort of the Utica Free Academy Student Council spearheaded by then President Steven Oram. Shares of imaginary stock were sold to students and the proceeds given to the City to highlight the need and community interest. Oram a successful Maryland Attorney went on to establish the Give Back to Utica Fund at the Community Foundation of Oneida and Herkimer Counties The newly founded four-team New York State League played all of its games there for the 2007 season.

It is the current home of the Utica Blue Sox, originally of the collegiate summer New York Collegiate Baseball League but today of the Perfect Game Collegiate Baseball League, and it is also used for American Legion baseball. The stadium was named after James H. Donovan.
