= Wil Cordero =

Puerto Rican baseball player (born 1971)

- Left fielder / Shortstop / First baseman
- Born: October 3, 1971 (age 54); Mayaguez, Puerto Rico
- Batted: Right Threw: Right

MLB debut
- July 24, 1992, for the Montreal Expos

Last MLB appearance
- July 19, 2005, for the Washington Nationals

MLB statistics
- Batting average: .273
- Home runs: 122
- Runs batted in: 566
- Stats at Baseball Reference

Teams
- Montreal Expos (1992–1995); Boston Red Sox (1996–1997); Chicago White Sox (1998); Cleveland Indians (1999); Pittsburgh Pirates (2000); Cleveland Indians (2000–2002); Montreal Expos (2002–2003); Florida Marlins (2004); Washington Nationals (2005)

Career highlights and awards
- All-Star (1994); Silver Slugger Award (1994)

Wilfredo Cordero Nieva (born October 3, 1971) is a Puerto Rican former professional baseball player. He played in Major League Baseball (MLB) as a left fielder, shortstop, and first baseman during 1992–2005 for seven different teams: the Montreal Expos, Boston Red Sox, Chicago White Sox, Cleveland Indians, Pittsburgh Pirates, Florida Marlins, and Washington Nationals.

== Professional career ==
Cordero had an opportunity to make the Montreal Expos roster on Opening Day in 1992, less than four years after he signed with the team at the age of sixteen, but he struck out 17 times in 38 spring training at bats, and was sent down to Triple-A Indianapolis. He debuted with the Expos after the All-Star break and finished with a .314 batting average in 45 games, despite missing significant stretches of playing time due to a sprained ankle, a strained middle finger, and a serious case of chicken pox.

A line drive hitter, he finished his first full season with a .248 average, 10 homers and 58 RBIs in 1993. As a shortstop, his below-average range and high error rate made him a poor defender. In the strike-shortened 1994 season, Cordero finished with a career-high .294 average, 15 home runs, 63 RBI, 65 runs scored and 35 doubles, and made the National League All-Star team. The next year he batted .286.

Cordero was traded to the Boston Red Sox before the 1996 season. The Expos received pitchers Rhéal Cormier and Shayne Bennett, and first baseman Ryan McGuire in the deal. In his first year in Boston, a pair of nagging injuries and the presence of John Valentin at shortstop limited his playing time. Cordero was used at second base and as designated hitter, appearing in 59 games. In 1997, he moved to left field and was an above average defender. He posted career-highs in games (140), home runs (18), RBI (72), runs (82), and hits (160). At the end of the 1997 season, the Red Sox released Cordero because of a domestic violence incident against his former wife, and he signed with the Chicago White Sox.

From 1998 to 2004, Cordero played for five teams, including two stints with the Cleveland Indians and a full season with his former club, Montreal. In 2004, he had arthroscopic knee surgery and was out for the season. Cordero was back in 2005, with the renamed Washington Nationals franchise.

On July 25, 2005, the Nationals placed Cordero on waivers for the purpose of giving him his unconditional release. The 33-year-old Cordero, who had been bothered by knee problems, batted .118 with two RBI in 29 games that season for the Nationals. On July 27, the New York Mets signed Cordero to a minor league contract and assigned him to their Triple-A affiliate, the Norfolk Tides. The Mets released Cordero on August 15 after he hit just .129 for the Tides.

After not playing at all in 2006, the Mets signed Cordero to a minor league contract on March 7, 2007, but released him during spring training.

Following his playing career, Cordero has worked as a baseball coach during the summers at Kutsher's Sports Academy in Great Barrington, Massachusetts.

In 2025, Cordero was hired as co-manager alongside Paul Wolf of the Niagara Falls Americans, a collegiate-level summer baseball team in the Perfect Game Collegiate Baseball League.

== Personal life ==
In 1997, Cordero pleaded guilty to assault and battery against his former wife Ana. Later that year, a restraining order was issued against Cordero in Puerto Rico for his alleged threatening of his wife. In 1999, Cordero was arrested in New York and charged with disturbing the peace for an alleged altercation with his wife's former husband. In 2002, Cordero was arrested in Orlando, Florida and charged with battery in a domestic violence case that was eventually dropped when the alleged victim refused to participate in the prosecution.

== See also ==
- List of Major League Baseball players from Puerto Rico
