= Matt Gorski =

American baseball player (born 1997)

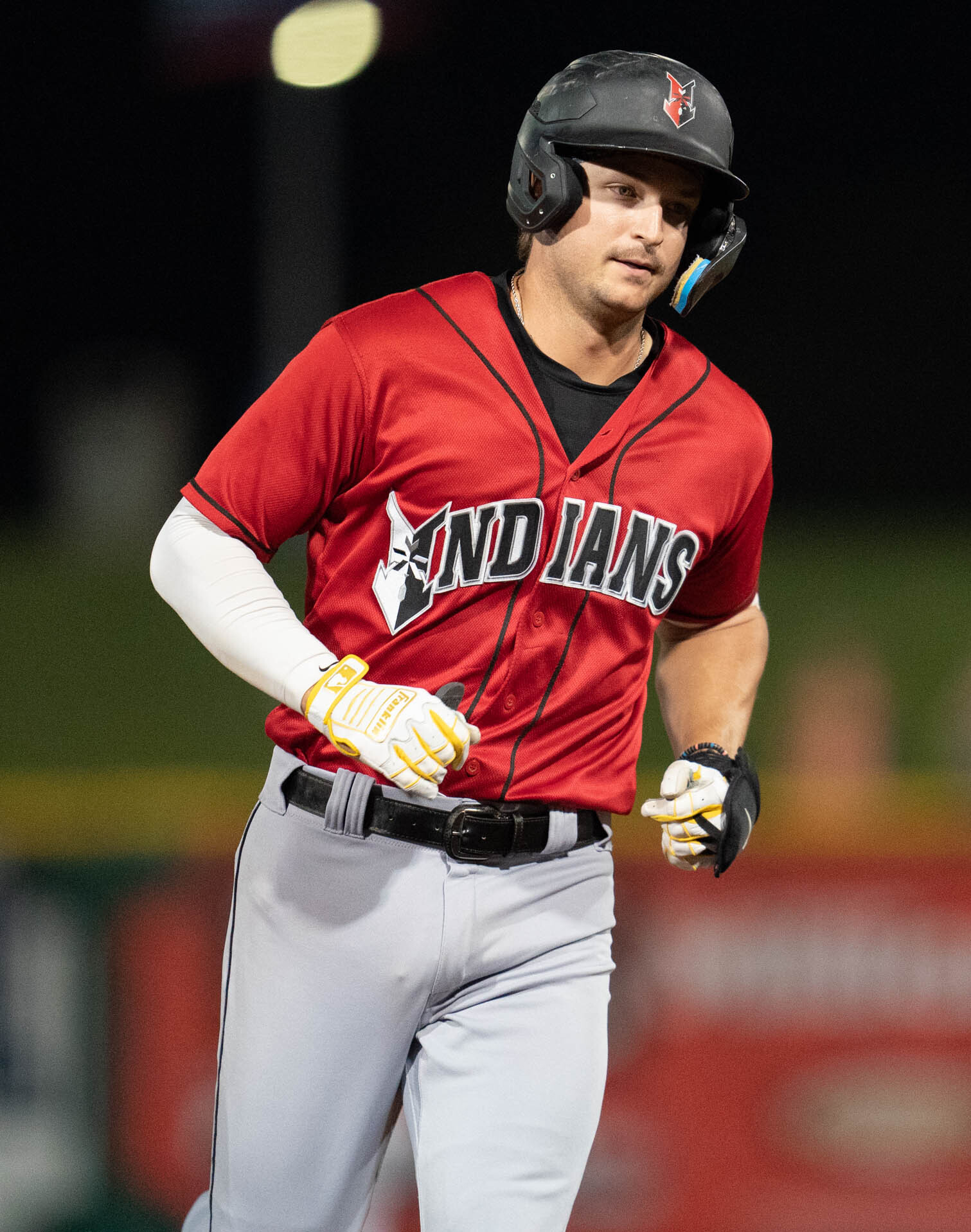
- Gorski with the Indianapolis Indians in 2023

Free agent
- Outfielder / First baseman
- Born: December 22, 1997 (age 28); Fishers, Indiana, U.S.
- Bats: Right Throws: Right

MLB debut
- April 24, 2025, for the Pittsburgh Pirates

MLB statistics (through 2025 season)
- Batting average: .195
- Home runs: 2
- Runs batted in: 4
- Stats at Baseball Reference

Teams
- Pittsburgh Pirates (2025)

Matthew Gorski (born December 22, 1997) is an American professional baseball outfielder and first baseman who is a free agent. He has previously played in Major League Baseball (MLB) for the Pittsburgh Pirates. He played college baseball for the Indiana Hoosiers and was selected by the Pirates in the second round of the 2019 MLB draft. He made his MLB debut in 2025.

== Early life and amateur career ==
Gorski grew up in Fishers, Indiana and attended Hamilton Southeastern High School.

Gorski played college baseball at Indiana for three seasons. As a freshman, he batted .288 with four home runs. After the season, Gorski played collegiate summer baseball for the Amsterdam Mohawks of the Perfect Game Collegiate Baseball League. Gorski was named first team All-Big Ten Conference as a sophomore after he hit for .356 average with eight home runs and a team-high 79 hits. He played for the Harwich Mariners of the Cape Cod Baseball League in the following summer of 2018. Gorski batted .271 with 12 home runs and was named second team All-Big Ten in his junior season.

== Professional career ==
=== Pittsburgh Pirates ===
Gorski was selected in the second round, with the 57th overall pick, of the 2019 Major League Baseball draft by the Pittsburgh Pirates. After signing with the team he was assigned to the West Virginia Black Bears of the Low-A New York–Penn League, with whom he hit .224 with three home runs, 22 RBI, and 11 stolen bases. Gorski did not play in a game in 2020 due to the cancellation of the minor league season because of the COVID-19 pandemic.

Gorski spent the 2021 season with the High-A Greensboro Grasshoppers and batted .223 with 17 home runs and 56 RBI. Gorski began the 2022 season with Greensboro. In late May, he was promoted to the Double-A Altoona Curve. In late June, Gorski suffered a quadriceps injury and was placed on the 60-day injured list.

Gorski split the 2023 season between Altoona and the Triple-A Indianapolis Indians, hitting .231/.291/.434 with 20 home runs, 61 RBI, and 23 stolen bases across 108 total appearances. He returned to Indianapolis in 2024, making 114 appearances and slashing .257/.319/.522 with 23 home runs, 67 RBI, and 15 stolen bases.

On April 24, 2025, Gorski was selected to the 40-man roster and promoted to the major leagues for the first time. In his first major-league at-bat with the Pirates, Gorski hit a home run, becoming the 136th player to do so. In 15 games for the Pirates, he hit .195 with two home runs and four RBI. On July 11, Gorski was designated for assignment by Pittsburgh. He was released by the team the next day after clearing waivers.

=== Los Angeles Dodgers ===
On July 23, 2025, Gorski signed a minor league contract with the Los Angeles Dodgers. He did not play in a game for the organization, spending the rest of the season on the injured list. In 2026, after starting the season rehabbing in the Arizona Complex League, Gorski joined the Triple-A Oklahoma City Comets and played in 41 games for them, batting .223 with five home runs and 21 RBI. He elected free agency on November 2.

== See also ==
- List of Major League Baseball players with a home run in their first major league at bat
