= Brett Kern =

American football player (born 1986)

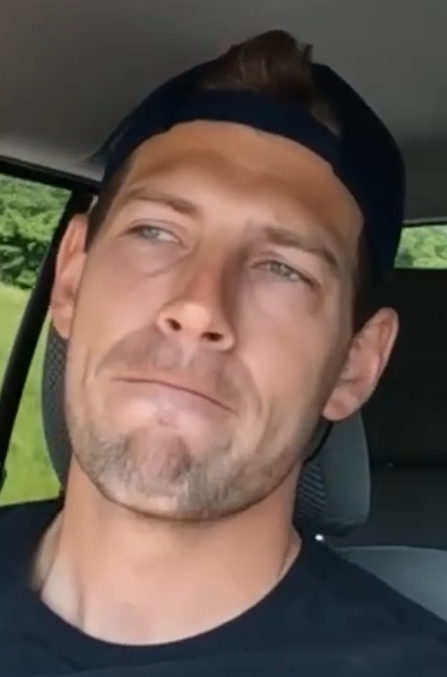
- Kern in 2023

No. 1, 6, 13
- Position: Punter

Personal information
- Born: February 17, 1986 (age 40); Grand Island, New York, U.S.
- Listed height: 6 ft 2 in (1.88 m)
- Listed weight: 214 lb (97 kg)

Career information
- High school: Grand Island
- College: Toledo (2004–2007)
- NFL draft: 2008: undrafted

Career history
- Denver Broncos (2008–2009); Tennessee Titans (2009–2021); Philadelphia Eagles (2022)

Awards and highlights
- First-team All-Pro (2019); Second-team All-Pro (2017); 3× Pro Bowl (2017–2019); PFWA All-Rookie Team (2008); Third-team All-American (2007); MAC Special Teams Player of the Year (2007)

Career NFL statistics
- Punts: 1,006
- Punting yards: 46,136
- Punting average: 45.9
- Longest punt: 79
- Inside 20: 396
- Stats at Pro Football Reference

Brett Alan Kern (born February 17, 1986) is an American former professional football player who was a punter in the National Football League (NFL). He played college football for the Toledo Rockets and was signed by the Denver Broncos as an undrafted free agent in 2008.

After being waived by the Broncos after less than two full seasons, Kern was then acquired by the Tennessee Titans in 2009 and became a three-time Pro Bowl selection and a two-time All-Pro with the team over the course of 13 seasons. After being released by the Titans, he spent part of the 2022 season with the Philadelphia Eagles before retiring.

== Early life ==
Kern is a 2004 graduate of Grand Island Senior High School, where he played on the football team. He was named All-New York State as a senior and was a member of the schools Section VI championship. Following graduation from high school, Kern represented New York State in the New York-New Jersey Governor's Bowl played at the United States Military Academy. He also played basketball and was a long jumper and high hurdler on the track team.

== College career ==
Kern played college football at the university of Toledo for head coach Tom Amstutz.

=== 2004 season ===
As a freshman in 2004, Kern was immediately inserted into the role of punter for the Rockets. In his collegiate debut, he had eight punts for 344 net yards (43.0 average) against Minnesota. In the next game against Kansas, he had a season-high nine punts for a season-high 357 net yards (39.7 average). On October 16, against Ohio, he had two punts for 101 net yards for a season-high 50.5 average. In the next game against Central Michigan, he recorded his first collegiate pass, a successful 46-yard throw. On the season, he had 44 punts for 1,788 net yards for a 40.6 average.

=== 2005 season ===
Kern continued to contribute in his second season as the Rockets' punter. On September 1, in the season opener against Western Illinois, he had three punts for 99 net yards for a 33.0 average. On September 27, against Fresno State, he had five punts for a season-high 206 net yards for a 41.2 average. On October 15, against Ball State, he had a successful passing attempt for 34 yards. On October 22 against Buffalo, he had two punts for 91 net yards for a season-high 45.5 average. Overall, in the 2005 season, he had 33 punts for 1,305 yards for a 39.5 average.

=== 2006 season ===
Kern's punting career continued into his junior season in 2006. On August 31, against Iowa State, he had a single punt for 46 yards in the season opener. On September 15, against Kansas, he had a season-high 12 punts for a season-high 484 net yards for a 40.3 average. On October 7, against Central Michigan, he completed a 25-yard pass. Overall, in the 2006 season, he had 60 punts for 2,502 net yards for a 41.7 average.

=== 2007 season ===
Kern's final season with the Rockets was in 2007. On September 1, against Purdue, he had eight punts for 394 net yards for a 49.3 average. On September 15, against Kansas, he had a season-high 10 punts for a season-high 420 net yards for a 42.00 average. On September 29, 2007, against Western Michigan, he had six punts for 323 net yards for a season-high 53.8 average. On October 27, against Northern Illinois, he had a 50-yard rush in the game. The MAC Report Online named Kern the Mid-American Conference's ‘’Special Teams Player of the Year’’ in 2007. Kern was also a finalist for the Ray Guy Award in 2007. That year, he averaged 46.5 yards per punt, second in the nation. Overall, in his final season, he had 52 total punts for 2,399 yards for a 46.1 average.

=== College statistics ===
Season	Team	Class	Pos	Punting		
Season	Team	Class	Pos	Punts	Yds	Avg
2004	Toledo	FR	P	44	1,788	40.6
2005	Toledo	SO	P	33	1,305	39.5
2006	Toledo	JR	P	60	2,502	41.7
2007	Toledo	SR	P	52	2,399	46.1
Career				189	7,994	42.3

== Professional career ==
Pre-draft measurables
Height	Weight
6 ft 2 3/4 in (1.90 m)	195 lb (88 kg)
Values from Pro Day

=== Denver Broncos (2008–2009) ===
In 2008, Kern won the starting punter job for the Broncos, winning the job over competitor Sam Paulescu.

During his rookie season, Kern attempted 46 punts for an average of 46.7. He made his NFL debut the season opener against the Oakland Raiders, recording two punts for 80 yards for a 40.0 average. Kern's longest punt of the year was 64 yards against the San Diego Chargers in Week 2. On October 5, against the Tampa Bay Buccaneers, he had five punts for a season-high 248 net yards for a 49.6 average. Kern gave away one touchdown that year against the Oakland Raiders in Week 12 when Johnnie Lee Higgins took the punt back 89 yards for the score.

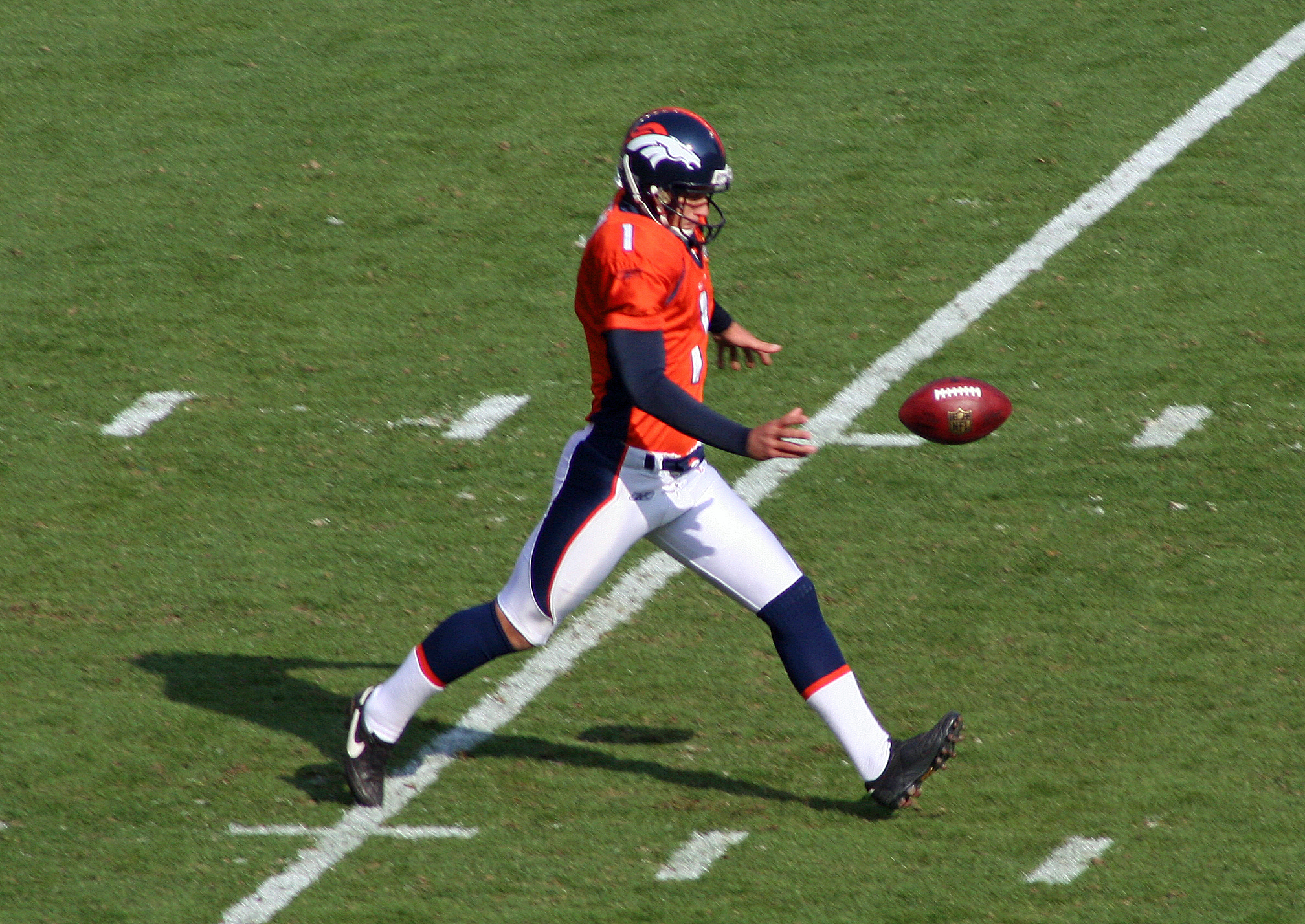
Kern in 2009

Kern remained as the Broncos' punter in his second professional season. In the season-opener against the Cincinnati Bengals, Kern had a season-high eight punts for a season-high 340 net yards for a 42.5 average. In the next game against the Cleveland Browns, he had two punts for 109 net yards for a season-high 54.5 average.

Despite having the third-highest yards per punt average in NFL history, Kern was waived by the Broncos on October 26, 2009.

=== Tennessee Titans (2009–2022) ===
==== 2009–2016: Early career in Tennessee ====
Kern was claimed off waivers by the Tennessee Titans, replacing Reggie Hodges. When Kern was released from the Broncos and claimed by the Titans, the Broncos were 6–0 while the Titans were 0–6. A subsequent Titans winning streak and Broncos losing streak led to a situation where teams with Kern on the roster had compiled a record of 11–0 to begin the season, despite the two teams being a collective 12–10 overall in that period.

On November 1, Kern made his Titans debut against the Jacksonville Jaguars. He had four punts for 193 net yards for a 48.25 average.

Kern finished the 2009 season with 64 punts for 2,910 yards for a 45.47 average.

Kern remained as the Titans' punter in the 2010 season. During the season opener against the Oakland Raiders, he had four punts for 200 net yards for a season-high 50.0 average. During Week 16 against the Kansas City Chiefs, Kern had a season-high eight punts for a season-high 352 net yards for a 44.0 average. Overall, in the 2010 season, he had 77 punts for 3,302 net yards for a 42.88 average.

On February 24, Kern signed a four-year, $5.2 million contract extension with the Titans with $2.1 million guaranteed.

During the season opener, Kern had seven punts for 291 net yards for a 41.57 average against the Jacksonville Jaguars. Two weeks later against the Denver Broncos, he had a 21-yard rush. During Week 8 against the Indianapolis Colts, Kern had a season-high eight punts for a season-high 330 net yards for a 41.25 average. On December 4, against the Buffalo Bills, he had five punts for 239 net yards for a season-high 47.8 average.

Kern finished the 2011 season with 86 punts for 3,747 net yards for a 43.57 average.

During the season opener, against the New England Patriots, Kern had four punts for 209 net yards for a 52.25 average. During Week 14 against the Indianapolis Colts, he had three punts for 165 net yards for a season-high 55.0 average. In the next game against the New York Jets, Kern had a season-high 10 punts for a season-high 391 net yards for a 39.1 average. Overall, in the 2012 season, he had 81 punts for 3,855 yards for a 47.59 average.

During the season-opener against the Pittsburgh Steelers, Kern had five punts for 208 net yards for a 41.6 average. In the next game against the Houston Texans, he had a season-high eight punts for 382 net yards for a 47.75 average. On December 8, against the Denver Broncos, Kern had four punts for 201 net yards for a season-high 50.25 average. Overall, in the 2013 season, he had 78 punts for 3,386 net yards for a 43.41 average.

In the season opener against the Kansas City Chiefs, Kern had six punts for 304 net yards for a 50.67 average. During Week 10 against the Baltimore Ravens, Kern had a season-high eight punts for a season-high 414 net yards for a 51.75 average. In the regular-season finale against the Indianapolis Colts, he had seven punts for 383 net yards for a season-high 54.71 average. In addition, he had a career-long 79-yard punt in the game.

Kern finished the 2014 season with 88 punts for 4,118 net yards for a 46.80 average.

On March 8, 2015, Kern signed a five-year $15 million contract extension with the Titans.

During the season opener against the Tampa Bay Buccaneers, Kern had four punts for 189 net yards for a 47.25 average. During Week 15 against the New England Patriots, he had five punts for 272 net yards for a season-high 54.4 average. In the next game against the Houston Texans, Kern had a season-high nine punts for a season-high 427 net yards for a 47.44 average. Overall, in the 2015 season, he recorded 88 punts for 4,175 net yards for a 47.44 average.

In the season-opener against the Minnesota Vikings, Kern had five punts for 231 net yards for a 46.2 average. Two weeks later against the Oakland Raiders, he had six punts for 311 net yards for a season-high 51.83 average. During Week 16 against the Jacksonville Jaguars, Kern had seven punts for a season-high 313 net yards for a 44.71 average. In the 2016 season, he finished with 77 punts for 3,402 net yards for a 44.18 average.

==== 2017–2019: All–Pro and Pro Bowl seasons ====
During the season-opener against the Oakland Raiders, Kern had four punts for 188 net yards for a 47 average. Two weeks later against the Seattle Seahawks, he had six punts for 341 net yards for a season-high 56.83 average. During Week 5 against the Miami Dolphins, Kern had a career-high 10 punts for a franchise-record 549 net yards and a 54.9 average.

On December 19, 2017, Kern was named to his first Pro Bowl. He finished the 2017 season with 75 punts for 3,728 net yards for a franchise-record 49.71 average. Kern was named second-team All-Pro.

The Titans finished the 2017 season with a 9–7 record and qualified for the playoffs as the #5 seed. In the Wild Card Round against the Kansas City Chiefs, Kern made his playoff debut. In the narrow 22–21 road victory, he had three punts for 131 net yards for a 43.7 average. In the Divisional Round against the New England Patriots, Kern had seven punts for 316 net yards for a 45.14 average.

On December 18, 2018, Kern was named to his second Pro Bowl. Kern finished the season punting 74 times with 39 being inside the 20.

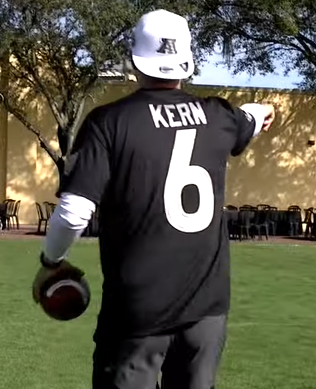
Kern at the 2020 Pro Bowl

On March 7, 2019, Kern signed a four-year, $12.55 million contract extension with the Titans.

On December 17, 2019, Kern was selected to his third consecutive Pro Bowl. He led the league in punts placed inside the 20-yard line with 37 and was named First-team All-Pro.

The Titans finished the 2019 season with a 9–7 record and qualified for the playoffs as the #6 seed. In the Wild Card Round against the New England Patriots, Kern had six punts for 275 net yards for a 45.8 average. In the Divisional Round against the Baltimore Ravens, he had six punts for 315 net yards for a 52.5 average. In the AFC Championship Game against the Kansas City Chiefs, Kern punted thrice for 139 net yards for a 46.3 average and threw a 28-yard completion to safety Amani Hooker on a trick play during the fourth quarter.

==== 2020–2022 ====
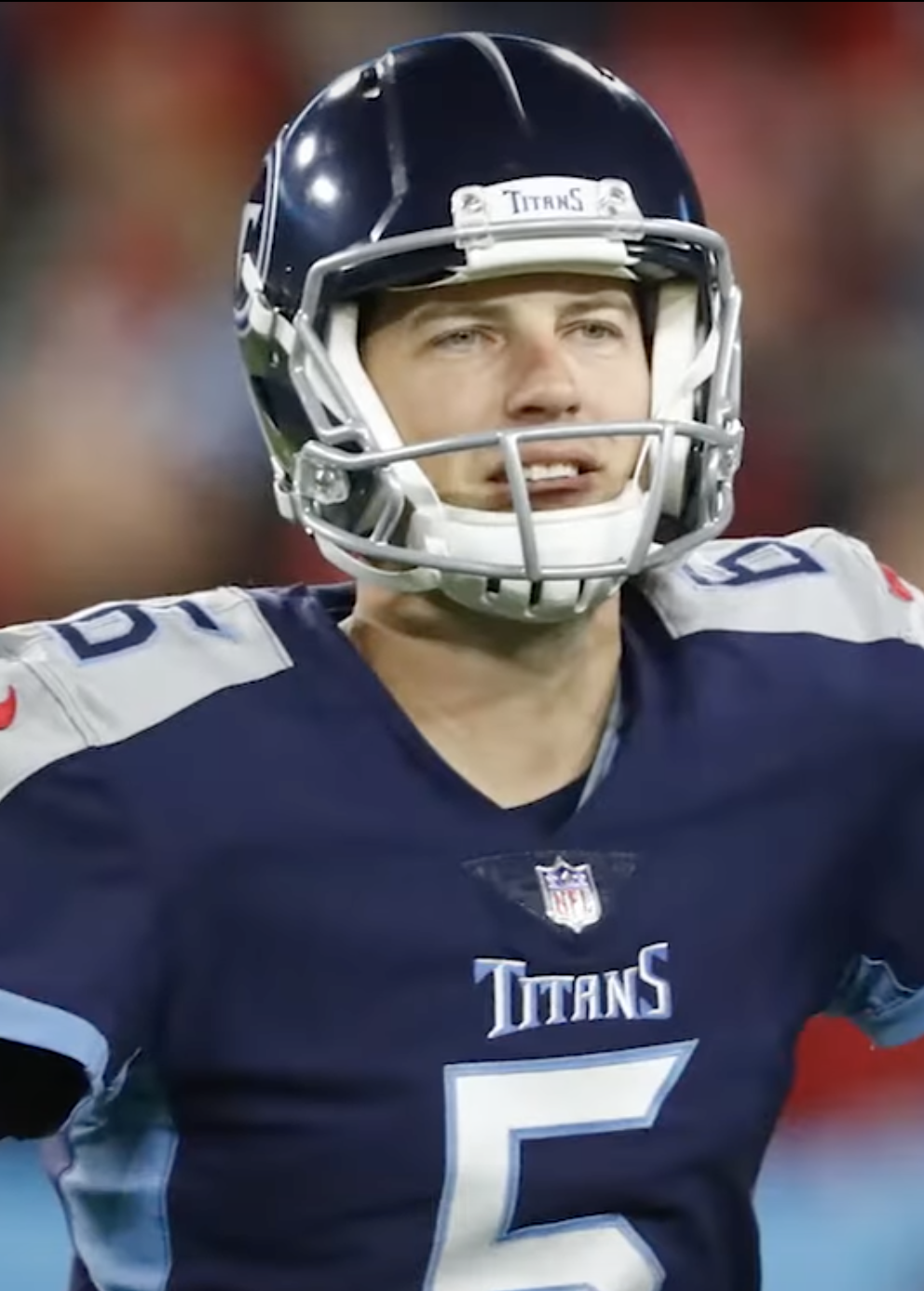
Kern in 2021

On November 7, 2020, Kern was placed on injured reserve after suffering a wrist injury in Week 8 against the Cincinnati Bengals. He was activated on November 28, 2020. Kern was placed on the reserve/COVID-19 list by the Titans on December 29, 2020, and activated on January 2, 2021.

The Titans finished the 2020 season atop the AFC South with an 11–5 record and qualified for the playoffs. In the Wild Card Round against the Baltimore Ravens, Kern had five punts for 228 net yards for a 45.6 average.

On October 12, 2021, Kern was placed on the reserve/COVID-19 list by the Titans. He had missed the two previous games with a groin injury. Kern was activated on October 22, 2021.

The Titans finished the 2021 season atop the AFC South with a 12–5 record and qualified for the playoffs as the #1 seed, earning a first-round bye. In the Divisional Round against the Cincinnati Bengals, he had four punts for 166 yards for a 41.5 average.

Kern was released by the Titans on August 29, 2022, after undrafted rookie Ryan Stonehouse from Colorado State won the starting job.

=== Philadelphia Eagles ===
On December 13, 2022, Kern signed with the Philadelphia Eagles' practice squad following an injury to their starting punter Arryn Siposs during a Week 14 game against the New York Giants. Kern was signed to the active roster on January 7, 2023. He appeared in four regular season games and two of the Eagles' postseason games.

=== Retirement ===
On June 1, 2023, Kern announced his retirement from professional football.

== NFL career statistics ==
Legend
	Led the league
**Bold**	Career high

=== Regular season ===
Year	Team	GP	Punting				
Year	Team	GP	Punts	Yds	Avg	Lng	Blk
2008	DEN	**16**	46	2,150	46.7	64	0
2009	DEN	6	27	1,245	46.1	64	0
2009	TEN	10	37	1,665	45.5	67	0
2010	TEN	**16**	77	3,302	42.9	68	0
2011	TEN	**16**	86	3,747	43.6	64	0
2012	TEN	**16**	81	3,855	47.6	71	**2**
2013	TEN	**16**	78	3,386	43.4	63	1
2014	TEN	**16**	**88**	4,118	46.8	**79**	1
2015	TEN	**16**	**88**	**4,175**	47.4	61	0
2016	TEN	**16**	77	3,402	44.2	71	0
2017	TEN	**16**	75	3,728	**49.7**	74	0
2018	TEN	**16**	74	3,483	47.1	62	1
2019	TEN	**16**	78	3,672	47.1	70	0
2020	TEN	13	37	1,645	45.8	66	0
2021	TEN	14	47	2,105	44.8	59	0
2022	PHI	4	10	408	40.8	53	0
Career		223	1,006	46,136	45.9	79	5

=== Postseason ===
Year	Team	GP	Punting				
Year	Team	GP	Punts	Yds	Avg	Lng	Blk
2017	TEN	2	10	447	44.7	62	0
2019	TEN	**3**	**15**	**729**	**48.6**	**63**	0
2020	TEN	1	5	228	45.6	53	0
2021	TEN	1	4	166	41.5	50	0
2022	PHI	2	7	309	44.1	53	0
Career		9	41	1,879	45.8	63	0

=== Records and achievements ===
==== Titans franchise records ====
- Most Punt Yards (career): 42,333
- Most Punt Yards (game): 549 (October 8, 2017, against the Miami Dolphins)
- Most Yards / Punt (playoff career): 45.8
- Longest punt: 79 yards

== Personal life ==
Kern is the son of Cal Kern, who owned the amateur Niagara Power baseball team. The team switched names in 2023 to the Niagara Falls Americans. Kern is married to Tiffany Kern and they have three kids: Bryce Jeremiah, Anelle Naomi, and Quinn Eliana. Kern is a Christian.

Kern is an avid golfer that sports a +1 handicap. He picked the game up late in his high school years and caddied in college for three summers at the Inverness Golf Club in Toledo, Ohio. In 2011, Kern competed in The Vinny, a local golf fundraising tournament hosted by singers Vince Gill and Amy Grant, and finished fourth in the event.
