= Damaschke Field =

Stadium in Oneonta, New York, US

Coordinates: 42.451716°N 75.058299°W

Dutch Damaschke Stadium
- Damaschke Field
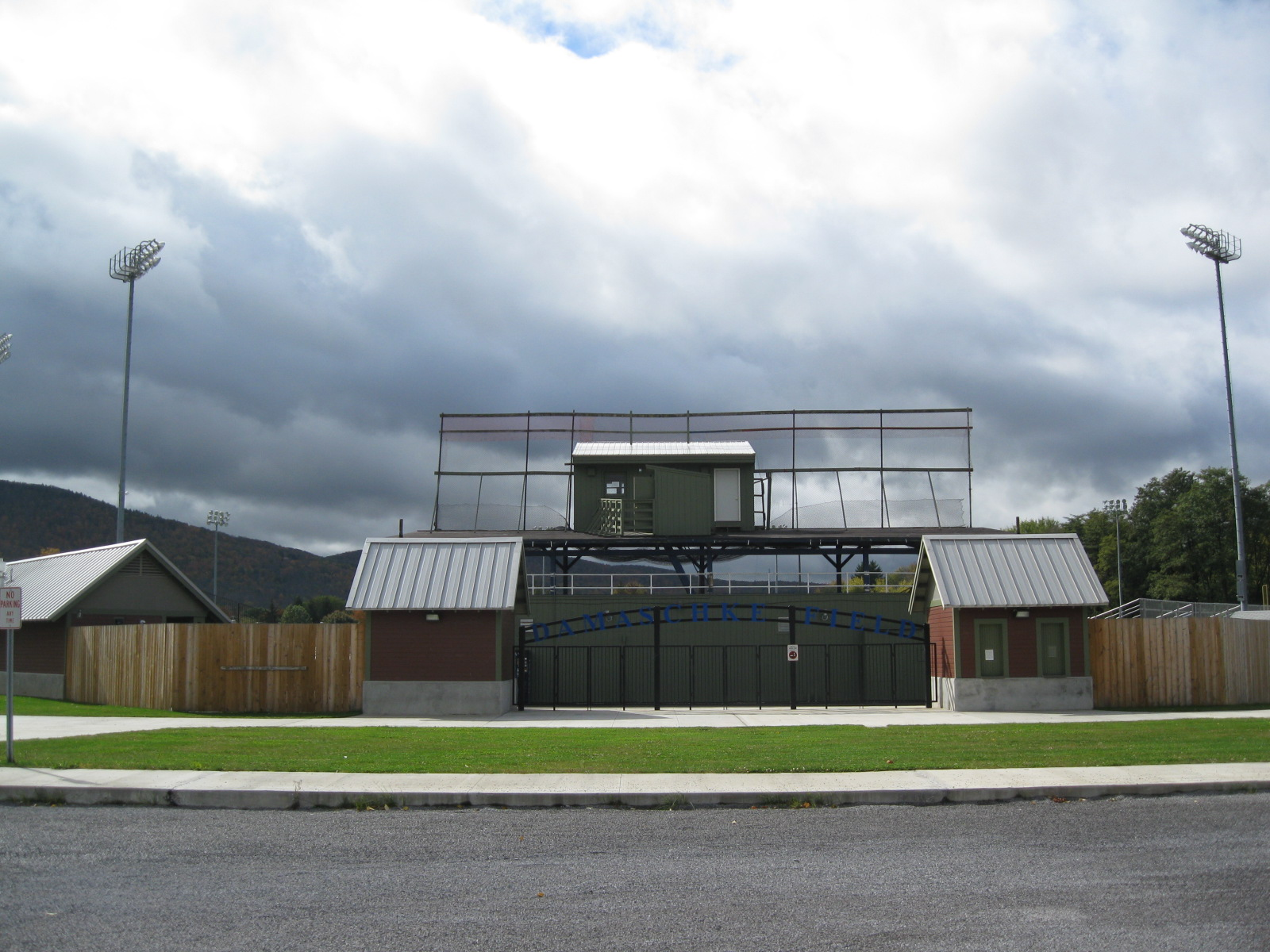
- Interactive map of Dutch Damaschke Stadium
- Former names: Elm Park (1905-1967); Dutch Damaschke Stadium (1968-present)
- Location: Oneonta, New York
- Capacity: 4,500
- Field size: Left Field: 333 feet Center Field: 401 feet Right Field: 335 feet

Construction
- Opened: 1905; 121 years ago

Tenants
- Oneonta Indians (NYPL/CAL) (1924, 1940–1942); Oneonta Red Sox (CAL) (1946–1951); Oneonta Red Sox (NYPL) (1966); Oneonta Yankees (NYPL) (1967–1998); Oneonta Tigers (NYPL) (1999–2009); Oneonta Outlaws (NYCBL/PGCBL) (2010–present)

Damaschke Field, officially Dutch Damaschke Stadium, is a sports playing field and stadium in Oneonta, New York. Primarily used for baseball, the field has been a municipal landmark for over a hundred years.

== History ==
The original baseball field was officially opened on Memorial Day in 1905 under the name Elm Park. Numerous stars from the early years of US baseball, including Babe Ruth and Rogers Hornsby, drew large crowds at the field for semi-pro and exposition games. A permanent steel grandstand was erected for spectators in 1938.

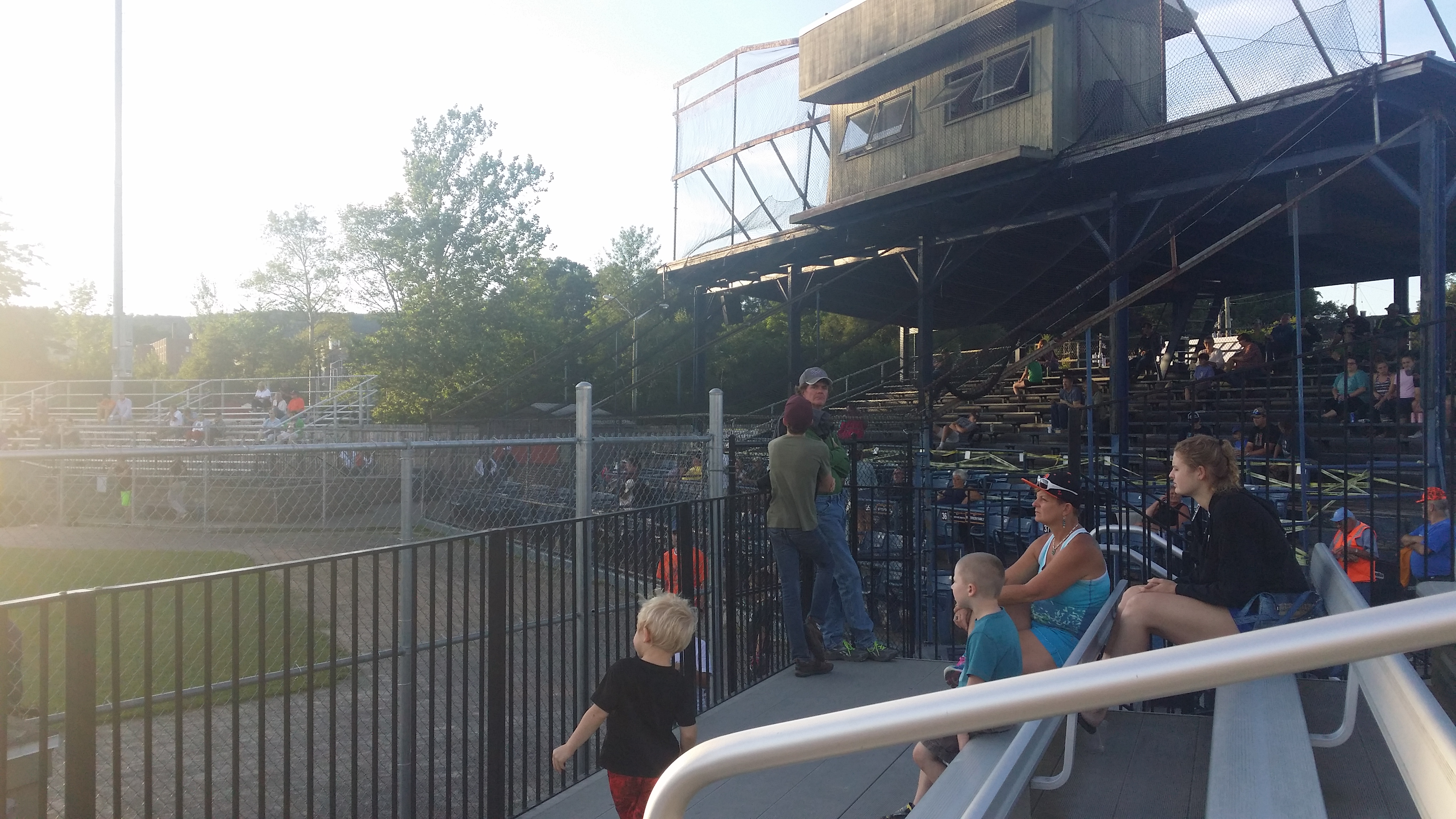
The grandstand and first-base side bleachers of Damaschke Field during a 2017 game.

In August 1968, the city renamed the site as Dutch Damaschke Stadium to honor local sports coach, referee, and counselor Ernest C. "Dutch" Damaschke, who had served as Oneonta's Recreation Commissioner for more than thirty years. The field and stadium are administered as public facilities within Oneonta's large Neahwa Park.

The site was the longtime home of the area's minor league baseball team, the Oneonta Red Sox (1966), Oneonta Yankees (1967–1998), Oneonta Tigers (1999–2009). The field has also regularly hosted the Oneonta Indians football team, the Oneonta United soccer team, and the Hartwick College baseball team. It is currently the home field of the Oneonta Outlaws, a collegiate summer baseball team in the Perfect Game Collegiate Baseball League.

A few games were staged here in late May of 1973 by the Syracuse Chiefs of the International League while their home field MacArthur Stadium was being repaired after a fire.

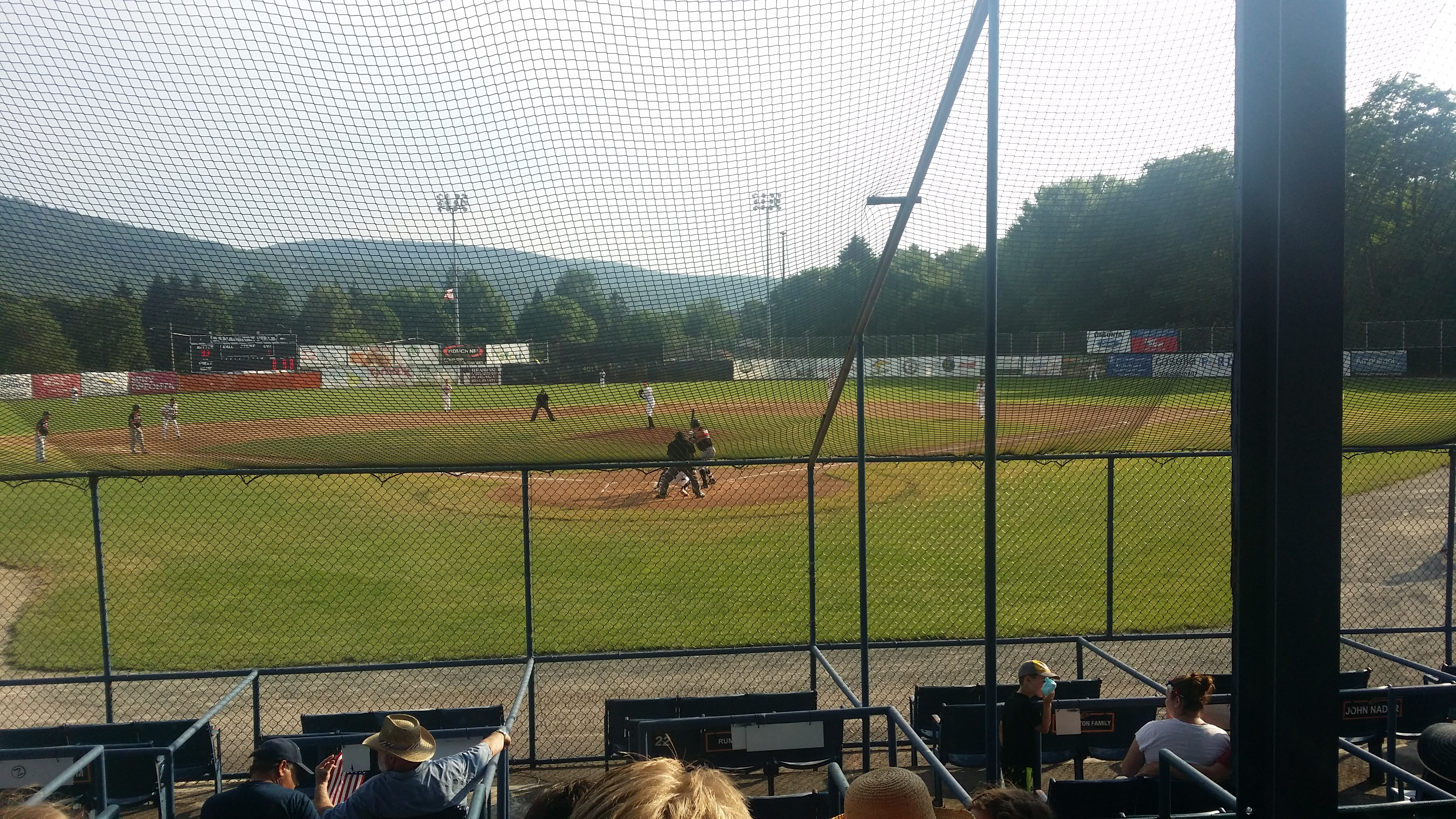
The field of play at Damaschke field during a game in 2018.
