= Cal Kern =

American soccer player and baseball owner/president

Cal Kern is the former president and owner of the Niagara Power, an amateur baseball team and the New York State Director of the Fellowship of Christian Athletes. He is a retired professional soccer goalkeeper and the father of former NFL punter Brett Kern.

== Soccer ==
Kern graduated from Kenmore East High School. He attended Buffalo State College where he played on the men's soccer team from 1968 to 1971. He was the 1971 First Team All American goalkeeper. On February 9, 1972, the Toronto Metros selected him in the first round with the third overall pick in the North American Soccer League draft. He remained a backup during his time with Toronto before moving to the Rochester Lancers where he was again a backup.

== Baseball ==
In 2007, Kern, in coordination with the Fellowship of Christian Athletes, founded the Niagara Power, a collegiate summer baseball team in the New York Collegiate Baseball League.
