= Dave Cash (baseball) =

American baseball player (born 1948)

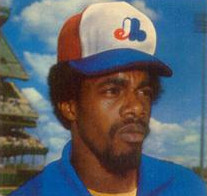
- Second baseman
- Born: June 11, 1948 (age 76); Utica, New York, U.S.
- Batted: Right Threw: Right

MLB debut
- September 13, 1969, for the Pittsburgh Pirates

Last MLB appearance
- October 5, 1980, for the San Diego Padres

MLB statistics
- Batting average: .283
- Home runs: 21
- Runs batted in: 426
- Stats at Baseball Reference

Teams
- Pittsburgh Pirates (1969–1973); Philadelphia Phillies (1974–1976); Montreal Expos (1977–1979); San Diego Padres (1980)

Career highlights and awards
- 3× All-Star (1974–1976); World Series champion (1971)

David Cash Jr. (born June 11, 1948) is an American former professional baseball player and coach. He played in Major League Baseball as a second baseman from 1969 to 1980, most prominently as a member of the Pittsburgh Pirates where, he was a member of the 1971 World Series winning team and, with the Philadelphia Phillies where he became a three-time All-Star player. He also played for the Montreal Expos and the San Diego Padres. After his playing career, Cash spent several years as a minor league hitting coach and manager for several major league organizations.

== Career ==
Cash was born in Utica, New York and attended Thomas R. Proctor High School. His MLB career started modestly, as he played in only 82 games over his first two seasons, though he still hit a very respectable .306 in 271 at-bats. Cash established himself as a solid singles hitter and a good defensive second baseman in his time in Pittsburgh. He was the Pirates' primary second baseman from 1971 to 1973, but his playing time was reduced somewhat by military service commitments and by the presence on the team of veteran second baseman Bill Mazeroski and rising star Rennie Stennett. After the 1973 season, with Stennett ready to play regularly and another excellent young second baseman (Willie Randolph) in their minor league system, the Pirates traded Cash to the Phillies for pitcher Ken Brett.

With the Phillies from 1974 to 1976, Cash became a true everyday player, missing only two games over three seasons. He made the All-Star team each year, and batted .300 or better with over 200 hits in both 1974 and 1975.

After the 1976 season, Cash signed as a free agent with the Expos. He had a good season in 1977 but a disappointing year in 1978, and by 1979 had lost his job as the Expos' starting second baseman. He finished his career as a part-time player with the Padres in 1980.

== Coaching ==
In 2006, Cash was hired to be first base coach for the Baltimore Orioles.

In 2007, he was hired to be the Manager of the Utica Brewmasters in the New York State League established in 2007 in his hometown of Utica, New York. During the team's first game ever, Cash was ejected by the homeplate umpire for arguing balls and strikes.

In 2008, Cash was hired as the hitting coach for the Sussex Skyhawks in the CAN-AM League. The Skyhawks played in Augusta, New Jersey and won the 2008 CAN-AM League Championship 3 games to 0 over the Quebec Capitales.

In 2010, Cash served as the hitting coach for the GBL's Yuma Scorpions.

== Trivia ==
- Cash was part of what is believed to be the first all-black starting lineup (including several Latinos) in Major League history. On September 1, 1971, the Pirates' starting lineup was: Rennie Stennett, 2B; Gene Clines, CF; Roberto Clemente, RF; Willie Stargell, LF; Manny Sanguillén, C; Dave Cash, 3B; Al Oliver, 1B; Jackie Hernández, SS; and Dock Ellis, P.

== Career statistics ==
| Years | Games | PA | AB | R | H | 2B | 3B | HR | RBI | SB | BB | SO | AVG | OBP | SLG | FLD% |
| 12 | 1422 | 6057 | 5554 | 732 | 1571 | 243 | 56 | 21 | 426 | 120 | 424 | 309 | .283 | .334 | .358 | .983 |

In 21 postseason games, covering 4 National League Championship Series and 1 World Series, Cash batted .236 (21-for-89) with 9 runs and 6 RBI.

== See also ==
- List of Major League Baseball annual triples leaders

| Preceded by Dave Machemer | Frederick Keys manager 2001 | Succeeded by Jack Voigt |
| Preceded by Dave Machemer | Bowie Baysox Manager; 2002 | Succeeded by Dave Stockstill |
| Preceded by Rick Dempsey | Baltimore Orioles First Base Coach; 2005–2006 | Succeeded by Rick Dempsey |
