= Shuttleworth Park =

Ballpark in Amsterdam, New York, US

Coordinates: 42°57′34.3″N 74°10′17.1″W

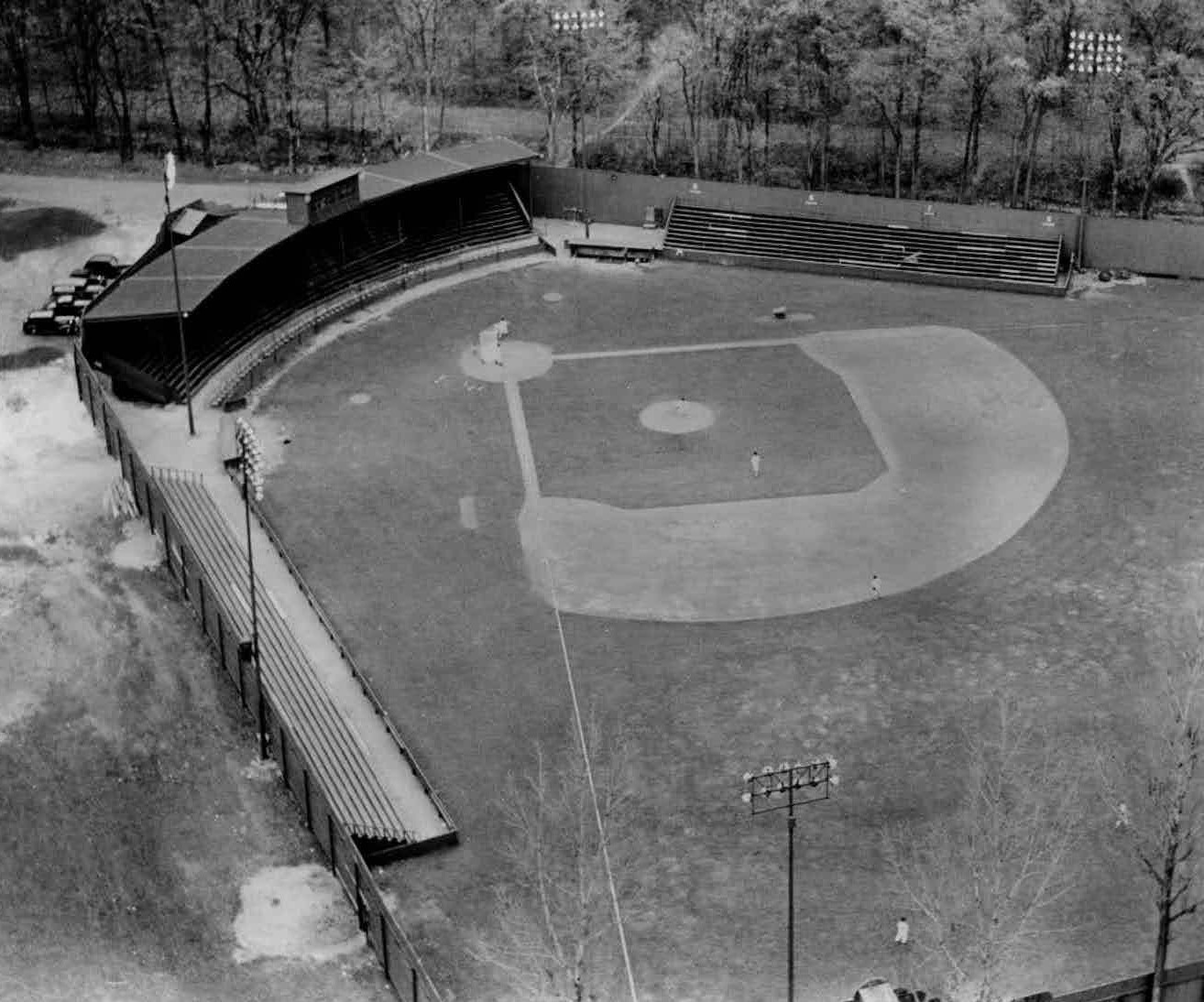
Shuttleworth Park in 1955

Shuttleworth Park is a ballpark in Amsterdam, New York, United States. It is home to the Amsterdam Mohawks of the Perfect Game Collegiate Baseball League. The ballpark capacity is 3,000.

== History ==
Shuttleworth Park, formerly Mohawk Mills Park, initially called Crescent Park, opened on Memorial Day, 1914. Its original use was as an amusement emporium, with a dance hall, shooting gallery, et cetera - though it also had a baseball park at that time. The first baseball game was played between a local team known as the Empires and the Philadelphia Colored Giants. It had a short left field at only 279 feet but a deep center field at 409 feet.

The park later changed its name to Jollyland. In the 1930s, it was sold to Mohawk Carpet Mills. In 1939, the Amsterdam Rugmakers arrived. The park was their home stadium until 1951.

The park burned down on July 12, 1942, eight days before the New York Yankees were set to play the Rugmakers in an exhibition. The locals managed to rebuild the stadium in that short time, increasing the park's seating capacity.

The Yankees drew a large crowd from the locals, and most local children chased foul balls for a dime.

After the Rugmakers left the park, the green walls around the stadium started to rot, and the historic grounds were refurbished in the late 70s.

The grandstand section of Shuttleworth Park is original from 1914 when it opened, and it remains one of the oldest ballparks still standing.

It has been home to the Amsterdam Mohawks since 2003.

The Union College Dutchmen baseball team also plays its home games at Shuttleworth Park.
