= Oneonta Outlaws =

- Logo

Information
- League: PGCBL (2012, 2016-Present) (East Division)
- Location: Oneonta, New York
- Ballpark: Damaschke Field
- Founded: 1966; 60 years ago
- League championships: (NYPL): 1968, 1969, 1971, 1974, 1977, 1979, 1980, 1981, 1985, 1988, 1990, 1998 (NYCBL): 2011, 2013 (PGCBL): None
- Former name: Oneonta Red Sox (1966); Oneonta Yankees (1967–1998); Oneonta Tigers (1999–2009)
- Former league(s): NYCBL (2010-2011, 2013-2015); NYPL (1966-2009)
- Ownership: Gary Laing
- Manager: Joe Hughes (2018-present)
- Website: oneontaoutlaws.com

The Oneonta Outlaws are a collegiate summer baseball team in the Perfect Game Collegiate Baseball League (PGCBL).

== History ==
=== Previous Oneonta teams ===
Oneonta, located just 30 minutes from the National Baseball Hall of Fame in Cooperstown, first appeared on the baseball map in 1890 with the Oneonta Indians and was a mainstay in the New York–Penn League (NYPL) for more than 40 years, beginning with the arrival of the Oneonta Red Sox in 1966. From 1967 to 2009 the team competed in NYPL as the Oneonta Yankees/Tigers, and won 12 league championships, the most among all league franchises.

On January 27, 2010, Oneonta Mayor Dick Miller announced in a press release saying that the Tigers would be leaving Oneonta for Norwich, Connecticut for the 2010 season, and essentially ending its run as a pro team.

=== Collegiate summer team ===
In conjunction with team shifting operations to Norwich, the Saratoga Phillies transferred their rights in the wood-bat New York Collegiate Baseball League (NYCBL) to Oneonta, and announced that the team would play in Damaschke Field. The team would later be named "Outlaws".

After winning the 2011 NYCBL title, the team moved to the Perfect Game Collegiate Baseball League (PGCBL) for the 2012 season, but returned a year later after local businessman Gary Laing bought the team. The Outlaws won another NYCBL title in 2013, but rejoined the PGCBL before the 2016 season.

== Season results ==
Season	League	W-L	Manager	Postseason	Misc
2021	PGCBL	14-21	Joe Hughes	No	
2020	PGCBL	--	--	--	Season canceled due to COVID-19
2019	PGCBL	18-28	Joe Hughes	No	
2018	PGCBL	16-29	Joe Hughes	No	
2017	PGCBL	14-30	Atlee Pearson	No	
2016	PGCBL	24-24	Atlee Pearson	Yes (0-1)	
2015	NYCBL	26-18	Joe Hughes	Yes (4-3)	
2014	NYCBL	27-19	Joe Hughes	Yes (4-4)	
2013	NYCBL	25-15	Joe Hughes	Yes (4-1)	NYCBL Championship
2012	PGCBL	25-22	Greg Zackrison	No	
2011	NYCBL	29-15	Greg Zackrison	Yes (5-0)	NYCBL Championship
2010	NYCBL	26-16	Greg Zackrison	Yes (0-2)	

== Notable alumni ==
- Artie Lewicki (2014)
- Carlos Asuaje (2013)
- Tom Murphy (2012)
- Chandler Engel (2016, 2017)
- Quin Cotton (2016)

As of January 2021 there are 41 Outlaws alumni who got drafted in the MLB draft and 52 players that continued to pro career.
