= Perfect Game Collegiate Baseball League =

Collegiate summer baseball league

- Current season, competition or edition: 2026 PGCBL season
- Sport: Baseball
- Founded: 2010
- President: Joe Milazzo
- No. of teams: 16
- Countries: United States, Canada
- Most recent champions: Batavia Muckdogs (1st title)
- Most titles: Amsterdam Mohawks (8)
- Website: pgcbl.com

The Perfect Game Collegiate Baseball League (PGCBL) is a 16-team collegiate summer baseball league founded in 2010. As of 2025, all teams are within the state of New York save one in the province of Ontario, Canada. All players in the league must have NCAA eligibility remaining in order to participate. Players are not paid so as to maintain their college eligibility. Each team plays an eight-week, 48 game schedule from June to August with playoffs in early August.

== History ==
The Perfect Game Collegiate Baseball League was founded in the fall of 2010 by eight summer baseball teams located across upstate New York in conjunction with Perfect Game USA, baseball's largest scouting service. The eight founding members of the PGCBL were the Albany Dutchmen, Amsterdam Mohawks, Cooperstown Hawkeyes, Elmira Pioneers, Glens Falls Golden Eagles, Mohawk Valley DiamondDawgs, Newark Pilots and Watertown Wizards. The league's first season was completed in the summer of 2011.

The eight teams were broken down into two divisions, PGCBL East and PGCBL West. The East comprised Albany, Amsterdam, Glens Falls and Mohawk Valley. The West was made up of Cooperstown, Elmira, Newark and Watertown. Glens Falls and Cooperstown were the regular season division champions in the PGCBL East and West respectively. Glens Falls, Cooperstown, Amsterdam and Newark qualified for the league playoffs. Newark defeated Amsterdam, two games to one, to win the very first PGCBL championship.

In 2012, the league expanded to nine teams with the addition of the Oneonta Outlaws. The two-division format was replaced by a single nine-team division with the top four teams in the league regular season standings qualifying for the playoffs. Amsterdam won 35 of 47 regular season games and captured the regular season championship. Amsterdam, Glens Falls, Newark and Mohawk Valley qualified for the postseason. Amsterdam swept Glens Falls to win its first league title. The Mohawks finished the summer ranked third nationally in Perfect Game's Summer Top 30 poll.

The Adirondack Trail Blazers and the Utica Brewers joined the PGCBL in the fall of 2012 while the Oneonta Outlaws were granted a one year Voluntary Suspension of operations. The 2013 season saw a return of the two-division format as 10 teams were broken into East and West divisions. Albany, Cooperstown, Glens Falls, Mohawk Valley and defending champion Amsterdam formed the East while newcomers Adirondack and Utica joined Elmira, Newark and Watertown in the West. A new playoff format featuring six teams was instituted as the first and second-place finishers in each division were joined for the first time by the third-place finishing team – this led to a down-to-wire playoff chase where the sixth and final playoff spot was not decided until the final night of the regular season. Amsterdam and Watertown overcame slow starts to win division titles; each team captured its first division title in the PGCBL. Albany, Mohawk Valley, Elmira and Newark rounded out the playoff field. Three seeds Albany and Elmira each won opening round playoff games over second-seeded Mohawk Valley and Newark respectively to advance to the divisional finals against Amsterdam and Watertown. Amsterdam edged out Albany and Elmira in back-to-back Game 3's to become the first repeat champion in league history.

The Cooperstown Hawkeyes were placed on Voluntary Suspension for the 2014 season, leaving four teams in the East Division. The Amsterdam Mohawks again finished with the best record in the league at 36-11- winning the East by nine games over the Mohawk Valley DiamondDawgs. The West Division was a little tighter with the division coming down to the final days of the regular season. Newark came out on top, winning the division by a game and a half over Elmira with a 27–19 record. In the postseason, Mohawk Valley defeated the Albany Dutchmen in the one-game playoff in the East while Elmira beat the Watertown Rams in Elmira in the West. In the East Division Championship Series, Amsterdam swept Mohawk Valley en route to a fourth consecutive PGCBL Championship Series appearance. In the West, Newark escaped against Elmira to set up a rematch of the 2011 Championship Series. Amsterdam came back from an early deficit to win Game One in Amsterdam and traveled to Newark the following night, where the Mohawks capped off a record-breaking season with the franchise's third straight PGCBL championship.

In July 2014, the league announced a franchise will be placed in Saugerties, New York and play in the East Division-effective for the 2015 season. In January 2015, the league announced the addition of a franchise in Victor for the 2015 season. The league also decided to play a 50-game schedule, compared to the previous length of a 48-game schedule. The Cooperstown Hawkeyes remained on voluntary suspension and were joined by the Watertown Rams.

In 2015, the Amsterdam Mohawks won the East Division with a record 40 wins in the regular season. The Elmira Pioneers won the West Division, with a team record 33 wins. Both teams were upset in the divisional round of playoffs as Mohawk Valley upended the defending champions in three games, while the first year Victor RailRiders swept the Pioneers. The Mohawk Valley DiamondDawgs then swept the RailRiders to capture the 2015 PGCBL Championship, the first in team history.

At the PGCBL owners meeting in October 2015, the league announced the addition of three teams to the league roster. Former NYCBL members Geneva and Oneonta jumped to the PGCBL for 2016. The Jamestown Jammers also decided to move to the PGCBL after having played in the Prospect League in 2015. In April 2016, the Utica Brewers changed their name to the Utica Blue Sox.

The 2016 season featured a 50-game regular season for the second straight year. A year after setting a PGCBL record with 40 wins in the regular season, the Amsterdam Mohawks again finished with the best regular season record at 34–15, winning the East Division. In the West, the Elmira Pioneers won their second straight division title with a 33–15 record.

A new eight-team playoff format saw the top two seeds in both divisions advance to the division finals, with Amsterdam meeting Albany and Elmira facing Utica. Amsterdam went back to the PGCBL Finals to meet Utica, who was making their first trip in franchise history. Both series went the full three games. Amsterdam then swept the PGCBL finals with two decisive victories to earn their fourth title in five years.

Before the 2017 season, the PGCBL announced the addition of the Onondaga Flames for the coming season, and awarded a franchise to Watertown, which would begin play in 2018.

Three teams earned playoff berths for the first time during the 2017 season. Saugerties earned the number four seed in the East, while Geneva bounced back from a 9–40 season to get a home playoff game in the West. Onondaga also qualified for the first time, picking up the number four seed in the West.

In the playoffs, Amsterdam and Mohawk Valley got through in the West, while Elmira and Jamestown matched up in the West Finals. Mohawk Valley then dethroned Amsterdam for the second time in three seasons to set up a PGCBL Finals with the Jamestown Jammers. The DiamondDawgs swept the PGCBL Finals to earn their second title.

With the addition of Watertown and the voluntary suspension of Onondaga, the PGCBL moved to a three division format, creating a West, Central, and an East Division before the 2018 season.

In March 2018, the PGCBL announced a new President and Vice President to guide the league into the future. Former New York–Penn League (NYPL) President Robert Julian was named President, and longtime right-hand man and Utica College baseball coach Joe Milazzo was named Vice President.

In October 2018, the defending champion Jamestown Jammers abruptly announced they were ceasing operations after the Milwaukee, Wisconsin-based ownership group pulled out of the league in favor of setting up an American Association of Independent Professional Baseball team in its home city. The city's PGCBL rights were suspended for 2019 with the intent to return in 2020; originally announced to be retaining the Jammers name and brand, the team unexpectedly announced in October 2019 that the new team would not use the Jammers name. The new name, Jamestown Tarp Skunks, was revealed in January 2020.

The 2020 season was cancelled due to COVID-19 pandemic on May 6, 2020.

In 2021, the league welcomed the Auburn Doubledays and the Batavia Muckdogs from the NYPL and the Niagara Power from the New York Collegiate Baseball League, bringing the league to a record 16 teams. The 16 teams were organized into three divisions: East, Central, and West. No 2021 All-Star game was held.

For the 2022 season, the PGCBL switched from the three-division format back to two divisions, East and West, and the Adirondack Trail Blazers were renamed the Boonville Baseball Club. All-Star games were not held in 2022 and 2023, but players were named for All-Star teams in both divisions.

In December 2022, industry veteran Butch Russo became the new proprietor of the Boonville Baseball Club. The team was renamed to the Boonville Lumberjacks.

On February 26, 2025, St. Catharines, Ontario, joined with the announcement of the Niagara Ironbacks to play at George Taylor Field.

On December 3, 2025, it was announced that the Olean Oilers would join the PGCBL for the 2026 season. Playing at Bradner Stadium in Olean, NY they would join the West Division.

== Current teams ==
Current teams
Division	Team	Founded	Joined	City	Stadium	Capacity
East	Amsterdam Mohawks	1978	2011	Amsterdam, New York	Shuttleworth Park	3,000
East	Boonville Lumberjacks	2010	2012	Boonville, New York	Robert Smith Sports Complex	1,000
East	Glens Falls Dragons	2003	2011	Glens Falls, New York	East Field^	8,000
East	Mohawk Valley Diamond Dawgs	2006	2011	Little Falls, New York	Veterans Memorial Park^	3,500
East	Oneonta Outlaws*	1966	2016	Oneonta, New York	Damaschke Field^	4,000
East	Saugerties Stallions	2015		Saugerties, New York	Cantine Field	N/A
East	Utica Blue Sox*	2008	2012	Utica, New York	Donovan Stadium at Murnane Field^	4,000
West	Auburn Doubledays*	1958	2021	Auburn, New York	Falcon Park^	2,800
West	Batavia Muckdogs*	1939	2021	Batavia, New York	Dwyer Stadium^	2,600
West	Elmira Pioneers*	1957	2011	Elmira, New York	Dunn Field^	4,486
West	Geneva Red Wings	2016		Geneva, New York	McDonough Park^	3,000
West	Jamestown Tarp Skunks§	2016	2021	Jamestown, New York	Russell Diethrick Park^	3,000
West	Newark Pilots	2011		Newark, New York	Colburn Park^	2,000
West	Niagara Falls Americans	2007	2021	Niagara Falls, New York	Sal Maglie Stadium^	4,000
West	Niagara Ironbacks	2025		St. Catharines, Ontario	George Taylor Field^	2,000
West	Olean Oilers*	2012	2026	Olean, New York	Bradner Stadium^	4,000

* Former NYPL franchise.
^ Former NYPL baseball venue.
§ Continuation of the former NYPL Jamestown Jammers intellectual property.

- West Division
- East Division

== Champions ==
- 2011: Newark Pilots
- 2012: Amsterdam Mohawks
- 2013: Amsterdam Mohawks
- 2014: Amsterdam Mohawks
- 2015: Mohawk Valley DiamondDawgs
- 2016: Amsterdam Mohawks
- 2017: Mohawk Valley DiamondDawgs
- 2018: Jamestown Jammers
- 2019: Amsterdam Mohawks
- 2020: Season cancelled due to COVID-19 pandemic
- 2021: Saugerties Stallions
- 2022: Amsterdam Mohawks
- 2023: Amsterdam Mohawks
- 2024: Amsterdam Mohawks
- 2025: Saugerties Stallions
- 2026: Batavia Muckdogs

== Awards ==
=== Player of the Year ===
- 2011: Erick Gaylord, Watertown
- 2012: Ross Kivett, Glens Falls
- 2013: John Nogowski, Amsterdam
- 2014: Josh Gardiner, Amsterdam
- 2015: Christian Santisteban, Elmira
- 2016: Joe Genord, Amsterdam
- 2017: Christ Conley, Jamestown
- 2018: Ryan Toohers, Mohawk Valley
- 2019: Max Costes, Amsterdam
- 2020: Season cancelled due to COVID-19 pandemic
- 2021: Griffin O'Ferrall, Auburn
- 2022: Gage Miller, Amsterdam
- 2023: Andrew Amato, Saugerties
- 2024: Cade Ladehoff, Amsterdam
- 2025: TJ Gramesty, Elmira
- 2026: Gabriel Rivera, Amsterdam

=== Pitcher of the Year ===
- 2011: Dominick Ruscitti, Newark
- 2012: Chandler Shepherd, Amsterdam
- 2013: Eann Cox, Cooperstown
- 2014: Jayson Yano, Newark
- 2015: Zach Logue, Amsterdam; Kyano Cummings, Elmira
- 2016: Joe DeSarro, Mohawk Valley; Brennen Smith, Victor
- 2017: Matt Pierce, Albany
- 2018: Mason Hazelwood, Elmira
- 2019: Lane Miller, Saugerties
- 2020: Season cancelled due to COVID-19 pandemic
- 2021: Nick Smith, Amsterdam
- 2022: Nolan Sparks, Batavia
- 2023: Aidan Colagrande, Mohawk Valley
- 2024: Gage Rowe, Auburn
- 2025: James Redick, Amsterdam
- 2026: Eric Woodley, Batavia

=== Coach of the Year ===
- 2011: Eric Coleman, Cooperstown
- 2012: Keith Griffin, Amsterdam
- 2013: Nick Davey, Albany
- 2014: Mike Armstrong, Newark
- 2015: Dan Shwam, Victor
- 2016: Blake Nation, Mohawk Valley
- 2017: Anthony Barone, Jamestown
- 2018: Anthony Barone, Jamestown
- 2019: Mickey Fauvelle, Adirondack
- 2020: Season cancelled due to COVID-19 pandemic
- 2021: Rich Dubee, Saugerties
- 2022: Keith Griffin, Amsterdam
- 2023: (co-winners) Joey Martinez, Batavia & Keith Griffin, Amsterdam
- 2024: Keith Griffin, Amsterdam
- 2025: Collin Martin, Saugerties
- 2026^: Batavia (Joey Martinez) & Saugerties (Collin Martin)

^Beginning in 2026, the award was rebranded as "Coaching Staff of the Year" and expanded to include one honoree from each of the Divisions.

=== Top Professional Prospect ===
- 2011:
  - Erick Gaylord, Watertown (Perfect Game USA)
  - Josh Anderson, Glens Falls (Baseball America)
- 2012:
  - Rocky McCord, Amsterdam (Perfect Game USA)
  - Chandler Shepherd, Amsterdam (Baseball America)
- 2013:
  - Mike Urbanski, Amsterdam (Perfect Game USA)
  - Trey Wingenter, Amsterdam (Baseball America)
- 2014: Jon Escobar, Watertown (Perfect Game USA)
- 2015: Kyle Smith, Amsterdam (Perfect Game USA)
- 2016: Jeff Belge, Amsterdam (Perfect Game USA)
- 2017: T.J. Collett, Amsterdam (Perfect Game USA & Baseball America)

=== All-Star Game MVP ===
- 2011: Cullen Wacker, Mohawk Valley
- 2012: Giuseppe Papaccio, Amsterdam
- 2013: Mike Fisher, Mohawk Valley
- 2014: Kevin Cowan, Glens Falls
- 2015: Scott Manea, Amsterdam
- 2016: Robbie Knightes, Glens Falls
- 2017: Anthony Vaglica, Glens Falls
- 2018: Alex O'Donnell, Jamestown
- 2019: John Rhodes, Oneonta

== All-Star Game results ==
- 2011: East 7, West 4 (July 18, Elmira, N.Y., Dunn Field)
- 2012: Team Griffin, 4 Team Ebright 0 (July 24, Amsterdam, N.Y., Shuttleworth Park)
- 2013: East 7, West 3 (July 24, Newark, N.Y., Colburn Park)
- 2014: East 3, West 1 (July 15, Elmira, N.Y. Dunn Field)
- 2015: East 18, West 2 (July 20, Little Falls, N.Y., Veterans Memorial Park)
- 2016: East 9, West 1 (July 20, Albany, N.Y., Bob Bellizzi Field)
- 2017: East 10, West 8 (July 18, Amsterdam, N.Y., Shuttleworth Park)
- 2018: West 8, East 5 (July 18, Elmira, N.Y., Dunn Field)
- 2019: East 5, West 5 (July 16, Saugerties, N.Y., Cantine Veterans Memorial Field)

== Single Season Records ==
- Hits – 67, Ryan Normoyle, Elmira Pioneers-2011
- Runs Scored – 52, Joseph Castellanos, Mohawk Valley DiamondDawgs-2018
- RBI – 57, Ryan Toohers, Mohawk Valley DiamondDawgs-2018
- Doubles – 20, Mark Stuckey, Mohawk Valley DiamondDawgs-2012, Kevin Ferrer, Adirondack Trail Blazers-2019
- Triples – 7, Chris Sharpe, Newark Pilots-2016, Taylor Olmstead, Utica Blue Sox-2016, Gage Lanning, Onondaga Flames-2017, Chase Keng, Jamestown Jammers-2018, Cadyn Karl, Niagara Power-2022, John Schroeder, Elmira Pioneers-2023
- Home Runs – 13, Andrew Amado, Saugerties Stallions-2023
- Total Bases – 106, Ryan Toohers Mohawk Valley DiamondDawgs-2018
- Walks – 51, Christ Conley Jamestown Jammers-2017
- Stolen Bases – 45, Andy Perez, Boonville Lumberjacks-2025
- Strikeouts – 84, Mason Hazelwood, Elmira Pioneers-2018

== Broadcasting ==
The PGCBL requires all of its member teams to produce television (usually Internet television) feeds with play-by-play for every home game. The play-by-play may be simulcast over radio.
