= Amsterdam Mohawks =

Logo
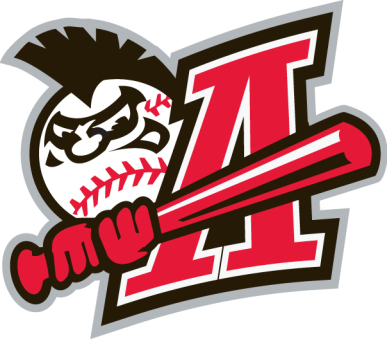
Cap insignia

Information
- League: PGCBL (2011-present) (East Division)
- Location: Amsterdam, New York
- Ballpark: Shuttleworth Park
- Founded: 1978
- League championships: (NYCBL): 1988, 2003, 2004, 2009, 2010 (PGCBL): 2012, 2013, 2014, 2016, 2019, 2022, 2023, 2024
- Division championships: 1988, 1999, 2002, 2003, 2005, 2009, 2010, 2012, 2013, 2014, 2015, 2016, 2017, 2018, 2019, 2021, 2022, 2023, 2024, 2025, 2026
- Former name: Schenectady Mohawks (1978-2002)
- Former league(s): New York Collegiate Baseball League (2002-2010), Northeastern Collegiate Baseball League (1978-2001)
- Former ballpark(s): Heritage Park, Ewing Field
- Colors: Red, Black & White
- Ownership: Brian Spagnola, Dave Dittman
- President: Brian Spagnola
- General manager: Megan Anagnostopulos
- Manager: Keith Griffin
- Website: amsterdammohawks.com

The Amsterdam Mohawks are a collegiate summer baseball team based in Amsterdam, New York. The team plays in the Perfect Game Collegiate Baseball League (PGCBL). The Mohawks, who were located in Schenectady prior to 2003, won the championship in 1988 under head coach and former team owner/president Bob Bellizzi.

The team's first year in Amsterdam, the Mohawks captured the title in 2003 under head coach Bill Consiglio, and again in 2004 under head coach Nicholas Enriquez. In 2009, current head coach Keith Griffin took over. The team has since won 10 more championships, in 2009, 2010, 2012, 2013, 2014, 2016, 2019, 2022, 2023, and 2024.

In 2011, after playing in the New York Collegiate Baseball League for over 30 years, the Amsterdam Mohawks became members of a newly formed league, the Perfect Game Collegiate Baseball League which combined some of the better summer baseball franchises in the nation and partnered them with Perfect Game USA, the world's leader in scouting and reporting services. The Perfect Game Collegiate Baseball League is a ten team summer league played throughout upstate New York.

In addition to Amsterdam, the PGCBL consists of teams located in Albany, Alburn, Batavia, Boonville, Elmira, Geneva, Glens Falls, Jamestown, Little Falls, Newark, Niagara, Oneonta, Saugerties, St. Catharines, and Utica. It is one of the most elite wood bat summer leagues in America. To be eligible to play in the PGCBL, a player must have completed at least one year of college and must still have at least one year of playing eligibility remaining. Each team is allowed two exceptions to that rule where graduating seniors are eligible to play, though the players must first be approved by Perfect Game USA. They must also be enrolled full-time at a college or university. Beginning in early June, each team in the league will play a 46-game schedule, which will wind down in early August.

In addition, there have been well over 200 former Mohawks who have signed professional baseball contracts. most notably 4x All-Star and 2x World Series Champion Hunter Pence who played for the Mohawks from Texas-Arlington in 2002 and Kansas City Royals Manager Matt Quatraro who played for the Mohawks in 1993 from Old Dominion. In 2020, Justin Foscue (Mississippi State) became the first former Mohawk taken in the first round as the Texas Rangers selected him with the 14th overall pick. In 2023, Matt Shaw (Maryland) became the Mohawks' highest draft pick as the Chicago Cubs selected him 13th overall. In 2025, Marek Houston (Wake Forest) became the third first round pick as he was drafted 16th overall by the Minnesota Twins. Currently, the Mohawks have over 70 former players in professional baseball.

== Alumni to reach the Majors ==
Glen Barker

Tim Christman

Logan Darnell

Justin Foscue

Matt Gage

Matt Gorski

Brendan Harris

Tim Herrin

Joe La Sorsa

Mark Leiter Jr.

Zach Logue

Luke Maile

John Nogowski

Valentino Pascucci

Hunter Pence

Cord Phelps

Andrew Saalfrank

Matt Shaw

Dylan Smith

Chandler Shepherd

Trey Wingenter

== League awards ==
Player of the Year
Year	Player	School
1988	Paul Reinisch/Nick Scattareggia	Wake Forest University/Siena College
2008	Mark Onorati	Manhattan College
2009	Brayden Kapteyn	University of Kentucky
2013	John Nogowski	Florida State University
2014	Josh Gardiner	Radford University
2016	Joe Genord	University of South Florida
2019	Maxwell Costes	University of Maryland
2022	Gage Miller	University of Alabama
2024	Cade Ladehoff	University of Michigan

Pitcher of the Year
Year	Pitcher	School
1988	Shaun Sottile	Siena College
2004	Derrick Gordon	Lamar University
2009	Brayden Kapteyn	University of Kentucky
2010	Kyle Hunter	Dartmouth College
2012	Chandler Shepherd	University of Kentucky
2015	Zach Logue	University of Kentucky
2021	Nick Smith	University of Evansville

Coach of the Year
Year	Coach
1988	Bob Bellizzi
2009	Keith Griffin
2012	Keith Griffin
2022	Keith Griffin
2023	Keith Griffin
2024	Keith Griffin

== Team single season records ==
Team single season records
Stat	Player name	School	Year	Total
Hits	John Valente	St. John's University	2017	62
Doubles	Zak Colby	Faulkner University	2012	19
Triples	Kirt Zimniewicz	University at Albany	2003	5
Triples	Cody Reine	LSU	2008	5
Triples	Elvis Peralta Jr.	Marshall University	2018	5
Home Runs	Maxwell Costes	University of Maryland	2019	12
RBI	Joe Genord	University of South Florida	2016	45
Runs	Gage Miller	University of Alabama	2022	50
Walks	Matt Colantonio	Brown University	2010	34
Stolen Bases	John Razzino	Franklin Pierce University	2014	23
Wins	Craig Soja	Le Moyne College	2003	7
Wins	Chandler Shepherd	University of Kentucky	2012	7
Wins	Ryan Tatlock	College of Saint Rose	2003	7
Wins	Tommy Warner	University of Kentucky	2005	7
Wins	Zach Logue	University of Kentucky	2015	7
Saves	Mike Puckli	Marist College	2004	11
Saves	Abram Williams	Radford University	2010	11
Strikeouts	Mark Leiter Jr.	NJIT	2011	74
ERA (Min 1 IP per Team Game Played)	Ryan Tatlock	College of Saint Rose	2003	1.29

== All-time Team Records ==
All-time Team Records
Stat	Player name	School	Total
Hits	Josh Gardiner	Radford University	120
Doubles	Vince Riggi	University of Richmond	26
Doubles	Josh Gardiner	Radford University	26
Doubles	Joe Genord	University of South Florida	26
Triples	Kirt Zimniewicz	University at Albany	5
Triples	Cody Reine	LSU	5
Triples	Ed Charlton	NJIT	5
Triples	Elvis Peralta Jr.	Marshall University	5
Home Runs	Joe Genord	University of South Florida	20
RBI	Joe Genord	University of South Florida	100
Runs	Gage Miller	Alabama	80
Walks	Brendan Tracy	Fairfield University	67
Stolen Bases	Josh Gardiner	Radford University	35
Games played	Vince Riggi	University of Richmond	117
Wins	Sean Bouthilette	University of Kentucky	12
Saves	Abram Williams	Radford University	25
Strikeouts	Mark Leiter Jr.	NJIT	127
Innings Pitched	Sean Bouthilette	University of Kentucky	115.0
