= Oneonta Tigers =

- 1999–2009; Oneonta, New York
Team logo
Cap insignia

Minor league affiliations
- Class: Short-Season A (1966–2009)
- League: New York–Penn League (1966–2009)

Major league affiliations
- Team: Detroit Tigers (1999–2009); New York Yankees (1967–1998); Boston Red Sox (1966)

Minor league titles
- League titles (12): 1968; 1969; 1971; 1974; 1977; 1979; 1980; 1981; 1985; 1988; 1990; 1998

Team data
- Name: Oneonta Tigers (1999–2009); Oneonta Yankees (1967–1998); Oneonta Red Sox (1966)
- Colors: Navy, white, orange
- Mascot: Sam the Tiger (1999–2009)
- Ballpark: Damaschke Field (1967–2009)

The Oneonta Tigers were a minor league baseball team located in Oneonta, New York. They were members of the New York–Penn League. The Tigers were the Short-Season A classification affiliate of the Detroit Tigers, and played their home games at Damaschke Field. The team was relocated to Norwich, Connecticut, for the 2010 season and became known as the Connecticut Tigers.

== Oneonta baseball history ==
Oneonta's first pro baseball team came to town on August 7, 1924, when the Utica Utes of the old New York–Pennsylvania League moved there. The newly renamed Indians folded at the end of the season. In 1940, the Cornwall, Ontario club in the old Canadian–American League moved to Oneonta. The Oneonta Indians (who, despite the name, were an affiliate of the Boston Red Sox) won back-to-back championships in 1941–42 before the loop shut down for three years due to World War II. After the war, the renamed Oneonta Red Sox took two more titles, in 1948 and in the league's final season of 1951.

In 1966, the Red Sox shifted their franchise in the current New York–Penn League from Wellsville, New York to Oneonta, keeping the Red Sox moniker for that season. In 1967, Sam Nader and Sidney Levine purchased the team and renamed them the Oneonta Yankees, or O-Yanks, an affiliation they would have for three decades. Stocked with future New York Yankees stars, the O-Yanks won NYPL titles in 1968, 1969, 1971, 1974, 1977, 1979, 1980, 1981, 1985, 1988, 1990 and 1998. Since 1991, the franchise has participated in the annual New York–Penn League Game in Cooperstown, New York. This is an official New York–Penn League game played at Doubleday Field in conjunction with the Hall of Fame's Induction Weekend festivities. In 1999, the Yankees moved their affiliation to the Staten Island Yankees, so the Detroit Tigers organization moved in.

Notable Oneonta Yankees alumni include Don Mattingly (1979), Bernie Williams (1987) and Jorge Posada (1991). NFL hall-of-fame quarterback John Elway batted .318 over 45 games in 1982 for the Oneonta Yankees in his brief professional baseball career.

=== Recent years ===
On July 20, 2006, the Tigers won the longest game in NYPL history: a 6-hour and 40-minute, 26-inning marathon against the Brooklyn Cyclones. Brooklyn scored the first run in the bottom of the first inning; the Tigers tied the game in the top of the fourth. Neither side scored again until the 26th inning, when the Tigers plated five runs (three earned) off of Cyclones outfielder Mark Wright, who had entered the game to pitch (the Cyclones had already used six of their regular pitchers). The Tigers had three players who went 1-for-12, including center fielder Deik Scram, whose lone hit knocked in the go-ahead run for the Tigers in the 26th inning.

The 2007 season ushered a new era for Oneonta Tiger baseball, as their stadium received a face-lift, while premiering the team's official website, www.oneontatigers.com.

Guillermo Moscoso pitched the second perfect game in NYPL history in a 6–0 victory over the Batavia Muckdogs on July 15, 2007.

In early July 2008, it was announced that long-time owner Sam Nader had sold the franchise he purchased in 1966. The agreement allowed the Tigers to stay in Oneonta up until the 2010 season.

=== Departure from Oneonta ===
On January 27, 2010, Oneonta Mayor Dick Miller announced in a press release saying that the Tigers would be leaving Oneonta for Norwich, Connecticut for the 2010 season. The new team would play their games in the newly renovated Dodd Stadium which had been vacated by the Connecticut Defenders of the Eastern League, who had left for Richmond, Virginia. Miller also said in the press release that he had hoped to have organized baseball playing in Damaschke Field for the 2010 baseball season, but early indications showed that local Oneonta High School will use the field for playing purposes as early as their 2010 season.

== Notable alumni ==
=== Hall of Fame alumni ===
- John Elway (1982) Inducted, Pro Football Hall of Fame

=== Notable alumni ===
- Brad Ausmus (1988–1989) MLB All-Star
- Dave Bergman (1974)
- Tom Brookens (2005–2006)
- Ken Brett (1966) MLB All-Star
- Mike DeJean (1992)
- Dave Eiland (1987)
- Damaso Garcia (1975) 2 x MLB All-Star
- Cesar Geronimo (1967)
- Curtis Granderson (2002) 3 x MLB All-Star
- Mike Heath (1974)
- Sterling Hitchcock (1993)
- Rex Hudler (1978)
- Jair Jurrjens (2004) MLB All-Star
- Ricky Ledee (1993)
- Al Leiter (1984–1985) 2 x MLB All-Star
- Jim Leyritz (1986)
- Mike Lowell (1995) 4 x MLB All-Star; 2003 World Series Most Valuable Player
- Tippy Martinez (1972) MLB All-Star
- Don Mattingly (1979) 6 x MLB All-Star; 1984 AL Batting Title; 1985 AL Most Valuable Player
- Andy McGaffigan (1978)
- Willie McGee (1977) MLB All-Star; 2 x NL Batting Champion (1985, 1990) 1985 NL Most Valuable Player
- Doc Medich (1970)
- Amos Otis (1966) 5 x MLB All-Star
- Mike Pagliarulo (1981)
- Andy Pettitte (1991) 3 x MLB All-Star
- Jorge Posada (1991) 5 x MLB All-Star
- Dan Pasqua (1982)
- Domingo Ramos (1975)
- Buck Showalter (1985–1986, MGR) 3 x AL Manager of the Year (1994, 2004, 2014)
- J.T. Snow (1989)
- Pat Tabler (1976) MLB All-Star
- Bob Tewksbury (1981) MLB All-Star
- Willie Upshaw (1975)
- Terry Whitfield (1972)
- Bernie Williams (1987) 5 x MLB All-Star; 1998 AL Batting Title
- Gerald Williams (1987)
