= Utica Blue Sox =

- 1939–2001; (1939–1950 and 1977–2001); Utica, New York

Minor league affiliations
- Previous classes: Short Season-A (1977–2001); Class A (1943–1950); Class C (1939–1942)
- Previous leagues: New York–Penn League (1977–2001); Eastern League (1944–1950); Can-Am League (1939–1942)

Major league affiliations
- Previous teams: Florida Marlins (1996–2001); Boston Red Sox (1993–1995); Chicago White Sox (1988–1992); Philadelphia Phillies (1986–1987); Co-op (1981–1985); Toronto Blue Jays (1977–1980); Philadelphia Phillies (1943–1950); Detroit Tigers (1940); Boston Braves (1939)

Minor league titles
- League titles: 2 (1947, 1983)

Team data
- Previous names: Utica Blue Sox (1997–2001); Utica Blue Marlins (1996); Utica Blue Sox (1981–1995); Utica Blue Jays (1977–1980); Utica Blue Sox (1944–1950); Utica Braves (1939–1943)
- Previous parks: Donovan Stadium (1981–2001); McConnell Field (1944–1950)

The Utica Blue Sox was the name of two minor league baseball teams based in Utica, New York.

In the 2010s, the Utica Blue Sox is the name of a collegiate summer baseball team of the Perfect Game Collegiate Baseball League (PGCBL) based in New York State.

== History ==
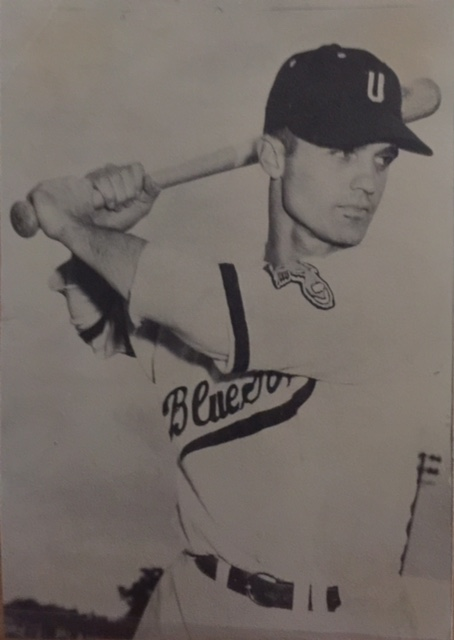

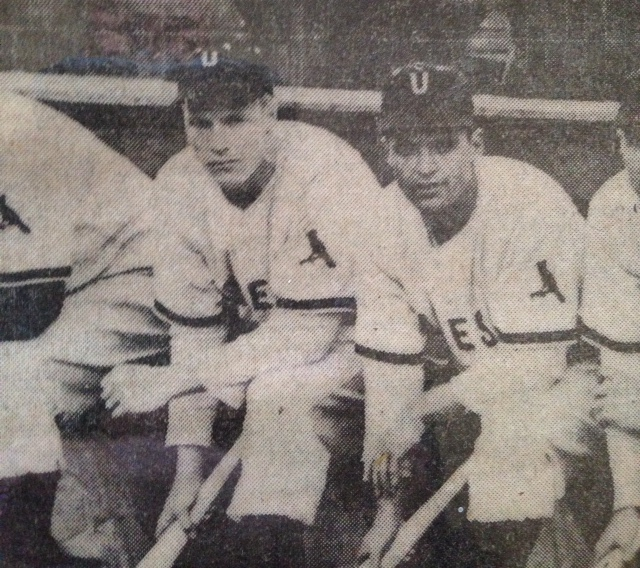
Richie Ashburn and Nick Picciuto Utica Blue Sox 1945

=== Previous baseball history ===
Utica's first baseball team took the field in 1878. The city fielded a team in the New York State League from 1899–1917, then was without professional baseball until 1939, except for one year, 1924, when the Utica Utes, a member of an earlier edition of the New York–Pennsylvania League, moved to Oneonta, New York, in midseason.

=== The first Blue Sox team ===
The first Blue Sox team can be traced to the Utica Braves of the Class C Canadian–American League, formed when the former Auburn Bouleys were moved to Utica by Amby McConnell and Father Harold Martin. The Utica Braves were initially a Boston Braves farm team in 1939 and kept the nickname through 1942. The Braves were also affiliated with the Detroit Tigers in 1941 and the Springfield Rifles in 1942.

In 1943, Utica moved up to the Class A Eastern League and became an affiliate of the Philadelphia Phillies. The nickname Blue Sox dates to 1944 when their parent team was unofficially called the "Philadelphia Blue Jays". The Blue Sox of the 1940s played in a ballpark in the northern part of the city called McConnell Field, which was named after the team owner and former pro player from Utica.

Many of the Blue Sox players of the 1940s later became the Whiz Kids of the 1950 National League champion Phillies.

Future Philadelphia stars such as Hall of Famer Richie Ashburn, who came to Utica as a catcher but within a month was moved to center field by his manager, Eddie Sawyer, to utilize his speed.

Others, including Stan Lopata and Granny Hamner, all took the field for both Utica and Philadelphia during the late 1940s.

Eddie Sawyer, manager of the Blue Sox in 1945 and 1947 and later for seven more years in Philadelphia, once said, "We had great ballclubs in a bad ballpark." Ashburn recalled the peculiar way the field was laid out, with center field to the west. "The sun would set over it", he once said. "I never got a hit up there in the first five innings in 150 games, and I still hit .300."

Murnane Field was considered one of the worst baseball layouts in the NY-P league with right field sloping downhill drastically by the time it hit the fence.

=== Second Blue Sox team ===
The name Blue Sox was resurrected in the Short-Season A classification New York–Penn League.

A new NY-P franchise began in 1977 as the Utica Blue Jays, playing at Murnane Field, being the first affiliate in the Toronto Blue Jays organization, from 1977–1980. That team included Toronto's first ever draft pick, Tom Goffena. The line up also included future major leaguers Jesse Barfield, David Wells and Paul Hodgson.

Toronto withdrew their affiliation after the 1980 season and the club played as an independent, under the name Blue Sox, from 1981 through 1983. The ownership of that team included Miles Wolff (Durham Bulls), actor/writer Brian Doyle Murray and his brother, comedian Bill Murray. Bill Murray sang the national anthem for the Blue Sox 1981 home opener. The independent Utica Blue Sox won the NY-P championship in 1983.

The team became an affiliate with the Philadelphia Phillies from 1986–1987, the Chicago White Sox from 1988–92 and the Boston Red Sox from 1993–1995. In 1996 the team became affiliated with the Florida Marlins and were renamed the Utica Marlins; however, the team was renamed the Blue Sox the very next season. Among the notable players who were once Utica Blue Sox players; Larry Walker, Miguel Cabrera, Adrian Gonzales, Andy Ashby, Jason Grimsley and Esteban Beltre.

By the end of the 2001 season, the city needed a standard level ball park and Donovan Stadium at Murnane Field was in need of renovations and repairs in order to keep the Blue Sox team in the league. On February 7, 2002, Cal Ripken Jr. and the Ripken Professional Baseball Association purchased the Blue Sox and moved the club to Aberdeen, Maryland, where it became the Aberdeen IronBirds.

For a time in the late 1980s, Morganna the Kissing Bandit owned a share of the Blue Sox.

== In media ==
Acclaimed author and journalist Roger Kahn (The Boys of Summer) wrote about his year as a part owner of the team for the 1983 championship season. The book, Good Enough to Dream, was published in 1985.

== Notable alumni ==
- Richie Ashburn (1945) Inducted Baseball Hall of Fame, 1995
- Larry Walker (1985) Inducted Baseball Hall of Fame, 2020
- Andy Ashby (1987) 2× MLB All-Star
- Jesse Barfield (1977) MLB All-Star
- Ken Brett (1985) MLB All-Star
- Miguel Cabrera (2000) 12× MLB All-Star; 4× MLB Batting Title (2011–2013, 2015); 2012 AL Triple Crown; 2× AL Most Valuable Player (2012–2013)
- Mike Cameron (1992) MLB All-Star
- Ray Durham (1991) 2× MLB All-Star
- Ross Gload (1997)
- Adrian Gonzalez (2000) 5× MLB All-Star
- Jason Grimsley (1986)
- Granny Hamner (1945) 3× MLB All-Star
- Willie Jones (1948) 2× MLB All-Star
- Fred Kendall (1992)
- Stan Lopata (1945) 2× MLB All-Star
- Chuck McElroy (1986)
- Steve Ridzik (1949)
- Wally Schang (1943)
- Scott Service (1986)
- Tony Taylor (1986–1987) 2× MLB All-Star
