= John Nogowski =

American baseball player (born 1993)

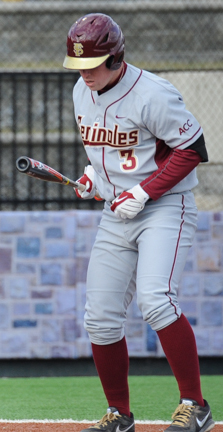
- Nogowski with Florida State in 2013
- First baseman
- Born: January 5, 1993 (age 33); Tallahassee, Florida, U.S.
- Batted: Right Threw: Left

MLB debut
- August 16, 2020, for the St. Louis Cardinals

Last MLB appearance
- August 15, 2021, for the Pittsburgh Pirates

MLB statistics
- Batting average: .233
- Home runs: 1
- Runs batted in: 14
- Stats at Baseball Reference

Teams
- St. Louis Cardinals (2020–2021); Pittsburgh Pirates (2021)

John Francis Nogowski (born January 5, 1993) is an American former professional baseball first baseman. He was drafted by the Oakland Athletics in the 34th round of the 2014 MLB draft. He played in Major League Baseball (MLB) for the St. Louis Cardinals and Pittsburgh Pirates from 2020 to 2021.

== Playing career ==
=== Oakland Athletics ===
Nogowski attended North Florida Christian School and played college baseball at Florida State University, batting .307/.431/.443 in 2014.

Nogowski was drafted by the Oakland Athletics in the 34th round, with the 1,032nd overall selection, of the 2014 Major League Baseball draft. He split his first professional season between the rookie-level Arizona League Athletics and Low-A Vermont Lake Monsters, batting a combined .264/.351/.347 with one home run and 32 RBI. In 2015, he made 96 appearances for the High-A Stockton Ports, and batted .274/.352/.364 with four home runs and 45 RBI. Nogowski split the 2016 campaign between Stockton and the Double-A Midland RockHounds, slashing an aggregate .273/.345/.402 with eight home runs and 38 RBI across 91 total games.

On March 27, 2017, Nogowski was released by the Athletics organization, prior to the start of the season.

=== Sioux City Explorers ===
On May 18, 2017, Nogowski signed with the Sioux City Explorers of the American Association of Independent Professional Baseball. Nogowski played in 32 games for Sioux City, slashing .402/.482/.607 with four home runs, 28 RBI, and three stolen bases.

=== St. Louis Cardinals ===
The St. Louis Cardinals purchased Nogowski’s contract on June 27, 2017. He would finish the 2017 season with the Double-A Springfield Cardinals. He would also spend most of the 2018 season with them, batting .309/.392/.463. He spent 2019 with the Triple-A Memphis Redbirds, batting .295/.413/.476 in 380 at bats while coming in third in the PCL with 69 walks and 10 hit-by-pitch, and tying for fourth by grounding into 15 double plays.

Nogowski was called up to the majors for the first time on August 15, 2020. He made his major league debut the next day against the Chicago White Sox and got his first major league hit off of Dallas Keuchel. In 2021, Nogowski made the Opening Day roster after batting .333 with two home runs over 33 spring training at-bats. Nogowski limped to a .056/.150/.056 slash line in 19 games with St. Louis before being designated for assignment on June 28, 2021.

=== Pittsburgh Pirates ===
On July 3, 2021, Nogowski was traded to the Pittsburgh Pirates in exchange for cash considerations. He hit .261 with 1 home run and 14 RBIs in 33 games with the Pirates. On July 7, in just his third game with the Pirates, Nogowski was used as a pitcher in a relief role. Facing a strong Atlanta lineup, Nogowski allowed a single, but retired the other three batters he faced. He was designated for assignment on August 16, 2021. On August 20, Nogowski cleared waivers and was assigned outright to the Triple-A Indianapolis Indians. On September 20, the Pirates released Nogowski.

=== San Francisco Giants ===
On September 22, 2021, Nogowski signed a two-year minor league contract with the San Francisco Giants organization. Nogowski appeared in 8 games for the Triple-A Sacramento River Cats, hitting just .185/.290/.444 with 2 home runs and 5 RBI.

=== Atlanta Braves ===
On December 8, 2021, the Atlanta Braves selected Nogowski from the Giants in the minor league phase of the Rule 5 draft. In 40 games for the Triple–A Gwinnett Stripers, he batted .234/.338/.323 with 2 home runs, 14 RBI, and 6 stolen bases. Nogowski was released by the Braves organization on June 16, 2022.

=== Washington Nationals ===
On June 22, 2022, Nogowski signed a minor league deal with the Washington Nationals. He was assigned to the Double-A Harrisburg Senators, hitting .202 in 30 games before being promoted to the Triple-A Rochester Red Wings later in the season. In 47 games for Rochester, he batted .290/.409/.401 with 2 home runs, 24 RBI, and 6 stolen bases. He elected free agency following the season on November 10.

=== High Point Rockers ===
On April 28, 2023, Nogowski signed with the High Point Rockers of the Atlantic League of Professional Baseball. In 37 games for the Rockers, Nogowski batted .297/.419/.625 with 11 home runs, 40 RBI, and 5 stolen bases. He was released by the team on June 9.

=== Sioux City Explorers (second stint) ===
On June 16, 2023, Nogowski signed with the Sioux City Explorers of the American Association of Professional Baseball. In 17 games with Sioux City, Nogowski hit .313/.397/.484 with 2 home runs, 9 RBI, and 3 stolen bases.

=== Acereros de Monclova ===
On July 5, 2023, Nogowski's contract was purchased by the Acereros de Monclova of the Mexican League. In 24 games for Monclova, he batted .277/.340/.319 with no home runs and 14 RBI.

=== Sioux City Explorers (third stint) ===
On August 19, 2023, Nogowski was acquired on loan by the Sioux City Explorers of the American Association of Professional Baseball. In 34 games for the Explorers, he batted .317/.419/.480 with 4 home runs and 16 RBI.

On May 2, 2024, Nogowski re-signed with the Explorers. In 100 appearances for the team, he batted .346/.461/.553 with 15 home runs, 76 RBI, and seven stolen bases.

=== Kansas City Monarchs ===
On June 3, 2025, Nogowski signed with the Kansas City Monarchs of the American Association of Professional Baseball. Nogowski made 75 appearances for the Monarchs, batting .277/.384/.411 with eight home runs, 49 RBI, and six stolen bases.

== Coaching career ==
On January 22, 2026, Nogowski was announced as the bench coach and assistant hitting coach for the Syracuse Mets, the Triple-A affiliate of the New York Mets.

== See also ==
- Rule 5 draft results
