= New York State League =

- New York State League logo
- Sport: Baseball
- Founded: 2006
- No. of teams: 4
- Country: United States
- Website: Official site

The New York State League was an independent baseball league that played six seasons between 2007 and 2012 in New York State and the New York City metro area. Over 500 NYSL players have been signed by professional teams. Players from forty-eight states and eleven countries have competed in the league. The NYSL was the developmental league for the Can-Am League. Its level of play was self-described as being on par with the lowest level of minor league baseball, the complex-based "rookie" leagues (it explicitly compared its format to that of the Gulf Coast League). The total of 7 teams were the Blue Sox, Capitals, Colonials, Empires, Federals, Hudsons and Robins, were spread out in New York state like in Albany (the Capitals who folded first); and in the last seasons, the rest were all in New York City.
