= Niagara Falls Americans =

- Logo

Information
- League: PGCBL (2021–present) (West Division)
- Location: Niagara Falls, New York
- Ballpark: Sal Maglie Stadium
- Founded: 2007
- League championships: (NYCBL): 2019 (PGCBL): None
- Division championships: (NYCBL): 2012, 2019 (PGCBL): None
- Former name: Niagara Power (2007–2015, 2018–2023)
- Former league: NYCBL (2007–2015, 2018–2020)
- Ownership: 16 Athletics (2027- ) CAN-USA Sports (2024–2026); John DiCarlo (2022–2023); Niagara University (2018–2022); Cal Kern (2007–2015)
- Manager: Paul Wolf, Wil Cordero

The Niagara Falls Americans are a collegiate summer baseball franchise which competes in the Perfect Game Collegiate Baseball League, a league designed to give college-eligible players an opportunity to compete while furthering their development and being scouted for professional consideration. Their home games are played at Sal Maglie Stadium in Niagara Falls, New York.

== History ==
The Niagara Power was established in 2007 by its first president and owner, Cal Kern, who operated the team in affiliation with the Fellowship of Christian Athletes. The Power, upon its inception, entered and competed in the New York Collegiate Baseball League. The team remained in the league until the conclusion of the 2015 season, after which Kern ceased operations.

The team was restored in 2018 under new ownership, the College of Hospitality, Sport & Tourism Management at Niagara University. Under the direction of Dr. Patrick Tutka, who assumed the role of team president, Niagara University ran the team with a model by which students handled almost all facets of game-day operations. The Power returned to the NYCBL in 2018, winning the league's championship in the 2019 season.

After the COVID pandemic forced the cancellation of the 2020 baseball season, the Power returned in 2021 but had switched leagues, leaving the NYCBL to join the Perfect Game Collegiate Baseball League.

Following the 2021 season, Dr. Tutka stepped down from the team. Niagara University continued to operate the team in 2022 under the direction of the College of Hospitality, Sport & Tourism Management's dean, Bridget Niland. Upon the conclusion of the 2022 season, local businessman John DiCarlo assumed ownership of the Power.

On December 15, 2023, the City of Niagara Falls and CAN-USA owner Robbie Nichols announced that the latter would assume ownership of the PGCBL's Niagara Falls franchise, rebranding the team as the Niagara Falls Americans.

On August 1, 2026, CAN-USA Sports announced it had sold the Americans to 16 Athletics, led by Jerry Puleo, who would assume operations for the 2027 season and beyond.

== Season-by-season record ==
Season	W-L	Playoffs?	Result
2026	13-28	No	
2025	30-16	Yes	Lost to Jamestown 12-2 in West Division semifinal
2024	16-24-1	No	
2023	22-19-2	No	Missed qualification for playoffs on final day of regular season
2022	16-28	No	
2021	19-26	No	First season in Perfect Game Collegiate Baseball League
2020	--	--	Season canceled due to COVID-19
2019	30-11	Yes (4-1)	Def. Mansfield 2 games to 1 in Western Division Finals; Def. Cortland 2 games to 0 in the NYCBL Championship Series; First NYCBL Championship
2018	23-19	Yes (0-1)	Lost to Olean 1–0 in Western Division first round
2017	--	--	No Team Fielded
2016	--	--	No Team Fielded
2015	25–21	Yes (3–3)	Def. Hornell 2–1 in the Western Division Semifinals; Lost to Olean 2–1 in Western Division Finals
2014	22–24	Yes (1-2)	Lost to Hornell 2–1 in the Western Division Semifinals
2013	13–27	No	n/a
2012	24–17	Yes (4–2)	Def. Olean 2–0 in the Western Division Semifinals; Def. Geneva Twins 2–0 in the Western Division Finals; Lost to Syracuse Junior Chiefs 2–0 in the NYCBL Championship Series
2011	24–20	Yes (0–1)	Lost to Geneva in the Western Division Semifinals (single-game)
2010	18–26	No	n/a
2009	11–29	No	n/a
2008	14–26	No	n/a
2007	17–25	No	n/a
TOTAL	238–269	12–10	250-279
