= New York Collegiate Baseball League =

Collegiate baseball tournament based in New York

- Sport: Baseball
- Founded: 1978
- Motto: Sending Players To The Pros since 1978
- No. of teams: 8
- Country: United States
- Most recent champion: Syracuse Salt Cats
- Website: nycblstats.com/composite

The New York Collegiate Baseball League (NYCBL) is a collegiate summer baseball league founded in 1978 and sanctioned by the National Alliance of College Summer Baseball, National Amateur Baseball Federation and Major League Baseball. Each NYCBL team plays a 42-game schedule starting in 2017, down from 46 previously, from June to July with three teams from each division making a three-round playoff. Several players from this league have become Major Leaguers. The league has teams located in central and western New York.

== Teams ==
- NYCBL West
- NYCBL East

Current teams
Division	Team	Founded	Joined	City	Stadium	Capacity
East	Rochester Ridgemen	2013		Irondequoit, New York	Carm Urzetta Field	Unknown
East	Sherrill Silversmiths	2009	2011	Sherrill, New York	Noyes Park	Unknown
East	Syracuse Salt Cats	2008	2010	Syracuse, New York	Onondaga Baseball Complex	571
East	Watertown Rapids	2017	2025	Watertown, New York	Duffy Fairgrounds	2,500
West	Dansville Gliders	2019		Dansville, New York	Babcock Park	Unknown
West	Genesee Rapids	2013		Houghton, New York	Houghton Baseball Stadium	Unknown
West	Hornell Steamers	1994 (Note: Originally founded as the Hornell Dodgers)		Hornell, New York	Maple City Park	1,400
West	Horseheads Hitmen	2018 (Note: Originally founded as the Mansfield Destroyers and have played in NYCBL for franchise's entire existence)	2022	Horseheads, New York	Holding Point Recreation Complex	Unknown

== Champions ==
Note: Hornell Dodgers became the Hornell Steamers before the 2022 Season

- 2025 – Syracuse Salt Cats
- 2024 – Syracuse Salt Cats
- 2023 – Rochester Ridgeman
- 2022 – Cortland Crush
- 2021 – Cortland Crush
- 2020 – Season cancelled due to COVID-19 pandemic
- 2019 – Niagara Power
- 2018 – Onondaga Flames
- 2017 – Hornell Dodgers
- 2016 – Olean Oilers
- 2015 – Olean Oilers
- 2014 – Hornell Dodgers
- 2013 – Oneonta Outlaws
- 2012 – Syracuse Jr. Chiefs
- 2011 – Oneonta Outlaws
- 2010 – Amsterdam Mohawks
- 2009 – Amsterdam Mohawks
- 2008 – Brockport Riverbats
- 2007 – Elmira Pioneers
- 2006 – Saratoga Phillies
- 2005 – Hornell Dodgers
- 2004 – Amsterdam Mohawks
- 2003 – Amsterdam Mohawks
- 2002 – Hornell Dodgers
- 2001 – Rome Indians
- 2000 – Hornell Dodgers
- 1999 – Newark Raptors
- 1998 – Geneva Knights
- 1997 – Ithaca Lakers
- 1996 – Ithaca Lakers
- 1995 – Hornell Dodgers
- 1994 – Ithaca Lakers
- 1993 – Little Falls Diamonds
- 1992 – Little Falls Diamonds
- 1991 – Broome Rangers
- 1990 – Little Falls Diamonds
- 1989 - Cortland Apples
- 1988 – Schenectady Mohawks
- 1987 – Cohocton Red Wings
- 1986 – Cohocton Red Wings
- 1985 – Broome Rangers
- 1984 – Broome Rangers
- 1983 – Broome Rangers
- 1982 – Cortland Apples
- 1981 – Broome Rangers
- 1980 – Broome Rangers
- 1979 – Syracuse Chiefs
- 1978 – Syracuse Chiefs

== Alumni ==
Active Major Leaguers:

- Shawn Dubin
- JD Martinez
- Tim Locastro

Former Major Leaguers:

- Jeremy Accardo
- Glen Barker
- Clay Bellinger
- Dallas Braden
- Scott Cassidy
- Archi Cianfrocco
- Logan Darnell
- Rajai Davis
- Mike Fiers
- Brendan Harris
- Tim Hudson
- Josh Kinney
- Steve Kline
- Greg Larocca
- Brad Lidge
- Kirt Manwaring
- John McDonald
- Tim Naehring
- Hunter Pence
- Earl Snyder
- Ka'ai Tom
- Cody Eppley
