= List of Major League Baseball single-game records =

The following is a list of single-game baseball records and unusual events. The following criteria are used for inclusion:

- Only events occurring within a single plate appearance, inning, or game are included; cumulative or aggregate records achieved over more than one game are not listed.
- Events occurring during post-season play are included, but events occurring during an All-Star Game are not included, nor are events for which the record in question is limited to post-season play.

== Individual batting/hitting ==
- Home runs from both sides of the plate in the same inning. Number of occurrences: 3. Carlos Baerga, April 8, 1993; Mark Bellhorn, August 29, 2002; Kendrys Morales, July 30, 2012.
- Grand slam in MLB debut game. Number of occurrences: 7. Bill Duggleby, April 21, 1898; Bobby Bonds, June 25, 1968; Jeremy Hermida, August 31, 2005; Kevin Kouzmanoff, September 2, 2006; Daniel Nava, June 12, 2010; Brandon Crawford, May 27, 2011; Jerar Encarnación, June 20, 2022.
- 19 total bases in a game. Number of occurrences: 2. Shawn Green, May 23, 2002 (4 home runs, a double and a single); Nick Kurtz, July 25, 2025 (4 home runs, a double and a single).
- 9 hits in a game. Number of occurrences: 1. Johnny Burnett, July 10, 1932. (18 inning game)
- 7 hits in a nine-inning game. Number of occurrences: 2. Wilbert Robinson, June 10, 1892; Rennie Stennett, September 16, 1975.
- Three hits in an inning. Number of occurrences: 5. Last by Johnny Damon, June 27, 2003.
- 4 triples in a game. Number of occurrences: 2. George Strief, June 25, 1885; Bill Joyce, May 18, 1897.
- 7 times on base in a game without a hit. Number of occurrences: 1. Bryce Harper, May 8, 2016. (13 innings; 6 walks, 1 HBP).
- 4 Intentional walks in a nine-inning game. Number of occurrences: 2. Barry Bonds, May 1, 2004 and September 22, 2004.
- 5 Intentional walks in an extra-inning game. Number of occurrences: 1. Andre Dawson, May 22, 1990.
- 3 runs scored in an inning. Number of occurrences: 3. Sammy White, June 18, 1953, Tom Burns and Ned Williamson (both in the same game for the Chicago Colts), September 6, 1883.
- 12 RBIs in a single game. Number of occurrences: 2. Jim Bottomley, September 16, 1924; Mark Whiten, September 7, 1993.
- Hitting into 4 double plays in a game. Number of occurrences: 3. Goose Goslin, April 28, 1934; Joe Torre, July 21, 1975; Víctor Martínez, September 11, 2011.
- Three sacrifice flies in a game. Number of occurrences: 12. Most recently, José López, April 15, 2008.

Event	# of occurrences	Most Recent	Refs
Four home runs in a game	21	Kyle Schwarber August 28, 2025	
2 grand slams in one inning	1	Fernando Tatís April 23, 1999	
1 grand slam from each side of the plate in the same game	1	Bill Mueller July 29, 2003	
Grand slam on first career pitch	2	Daniel Nava June 12, 2010	(Note: Kevin Kouzmanoff was the first to do so, on September 2, 2006)
Three sacrifice flies in a game	12	José López April 15, 2008	
10 or more runs batted in during a game	17	Ryan O'Hearn July 7, 2026	Baseball Almanac
Hitting for the natural cycle	18	Gary Matthews Jr. September 13, 2006	Baseball Almanac
6 singles in a 9-inning game	18	Raul Ibañez September 22, 2004	Baseball Almanac
6 or more runs scored in a game	19	Nick Kurtz July 25, 2025	Baseball Almanac
7 or more runs scored in a game	1	Guy Hecker August 15, 1886	
Home run on first pitch in the major leagues	33	Joshua Báez August 15, 2026	Baseball Almanac
Home run in final at bat in the major leagues	69	Brandon Belt October 1, 2023	Baseball Almanac
Home run in first at bat in the major leagues	145	Joshua Báez August 15, 2026	Baseball Almanac
Inside-the-park grand slam	224 (Note: As of 2002. This event was much more common before the modern era (i.e. the turn of the 20th century); there have been only 40 inside-the-park grand slams since 1950.)		
Hitting for the cycle	353 (Note: As of 9 September 2023.)		

== Collective batting/hitting ==
Event	# of occurrences	References
Two inside the park grand slams by two teammates in a game	1^{a}	Baseball Almanac
2 pinch-hit grand slams (by batters on different teams) in a game	1^{b}	Baseball Almanac
10 home runs by one team in a game	1^{c}	Baseball Almanac
Home runs by same 2 consecutive batters twice in same inning	1^{d}	AP Online
5 sacrifice flies by one team in a game	2^{e}	CBS Sportsline
9 or more home runs by one team in a game	2	Baseball Almanac
5 or more home runs by one team in an inning	8^{f}	Baseball Almanac
3 grand slams by both teams in a game	5	Baseball Almanac
3 sacrifice flies by one team in a single inning (Note: This may seem impossible. However, a sacrifice fly can be awarded without an out being recorded, if the fielder in question commits an error.)	4	Baseball Almanac
4 home runs by 4 consecutive batters	10^{g}	MLB.com
3 grand slams by one team in a game	1	Washington Post

== Individual pitching ==
- 20 strikeouts in a nine-inning game. Number of occurrences: 5. Roger Clemens 1986 and 1996 struck out 20. Kerry Wood in 1998. Most recently, Max Scherzer, May 11, 2016. In 2001, Randy Johnson also struck out 20 in a 9-inning start, but the game went on to extra innings.
- 21 strikeouts in a game of any length. Number of occurrences: 1. Tom Cheney, September 12, 1962 (pitched 16 innings of a 16-inning game).
- 26 innings pitched in a game. Number of occurrences: 2. Leon Cadore and Joe Oeschger, May 1, 1920. (Same game.)
- 4 consecutive home runs allowed. Number of occurrences: 5. Paul Foytack, July 31, 1963; Chase Wright, April 22, 2007, Dave Bush, August 11, 2010, Michael Blazek, July 27, 2017, and Craig Stammen, June 9, 2019.
- 7 home runs allowed in a game. Number of occurrences: 1. Charlie Sweeney, June 12, 1886.
- 6 wild pitches in one game. Number of occurrences: 3. Most recently, Bill Gullickson, October 4, 1982. Bert Cunningham of the 1890 Players' League threw five wild pitches in a single inning.
- 26 hits allowed in a game. Number of occurrences: 1. Allan Travers, May 18, 1912.
- 29 hits allowed in an extra-inning game. Number of occurrences: 1. Eddie Rommel (17 innings), July 10, 1932.
- Oldest pitcher to win a game. Jamie Moyer, age 49 years, 151 days, May 16, 2012.
- Most innings pitched by a relief pitcher in one game. Zip Zabel, 18 1/3 innings. June 17, 1915
- Fastest recorded pitch thrown by a pitcher in a game. Aroldis Chapman, 105.1 miles per hour (169.1 km/h). September 24, 2010.
- Slowest recorded pitch thrown by a pitcher in a game. Brock Holt, 30.4 miles per hour (48.9 km/h). August 7, 2021.

Event	# of occurrences	References
10 consecutive strikeouts in a game	3^{h}	Baseball Almanac
20 or more consecutive scoreless innings pitched in a game	2	Baseball Almanac
First 27 batters retired without a perfect game (Note: This may seem impossible. However, by definition a perfect game requires more than simply retiring the first 27 batters in order; it also requires that the pitcher's team wins, and that the pitcher completes the entire game. See perfect game for more details.)	2	
6 or more home runs surrendered in a game	4	Baseball Almanac
Base on balls given to the first 4 batters	4	Baseball Almanac
Intentional base on balls with the bases loaded (Note: These seven events may be the only times in the history of baseball when a team has deliberately and with premeditation allowed a run to score by the opposing team for strategic purposes. It is true that there are cases where a particular choice of defensive alignment may make scoring more likely, and there are cases where decisions made in the moment of play allow a run to score in exchange for other strategic purposes, but intentionally walking in a run is clearly in a different class of strategic maneuver. This may also have occurred when a pitcher was instructed to deliberately hit a batter with the bases loaded, but in this case, intention is not provable.)	7	Baseball Almanac
Home run surrendered on first pitch in major leagues	7 (Note: Baseball Reference lists 6, but Hideki Okajima surrendered a home run on his first pitch April 2, 2007.)	Baseball Almanac
Perfect game bid lost on the 27th batter	13	
4 consecutive strikeouts in a single inning (Note: This is possible when a batter who has been struck out reaches first base safely under a dropped third strike. That is, if strike three is recorded on the batter but the catcher does not catch the ball to complete the putout (likely because of a wild pitch or passed ball) and first base is unoccupied, the batter may advance to first; the pitcher is credited with a strikeout, but no out is recorded.)	17 (Note: The Baseball Almanac states that 17 pitchers have accomplished this feat. Of these, all but Chuck Finley have only once struck out 4 batters in a single inning (consecutively or otherwise). Finley however did it 3 times, but the Baseball Almanac does not state how many of those were consecutive strikeouts (i.e., whether it was once, twice, or all 3 times).)	Baseball Almanac
Perfect game	24 (Note: Some sources do not include the two perfect games thrown in the 19th century, because of differences in the rules of play, and thus list only twenty-one perfect games.)	
4 strikeouts in a single inning	62	Baseball Almanac
Home run surrendered to first batter faced in major leagues	69 (Note: Baseball Reference lists 64, but Russ Johnson took Shane Komine deep in Komine's 2nd pitch on July 30, 2006. As well, Brandon Phillips hit one off of Steven Matz on his 5th pitch June 28, 2015.)	Baseball Almanac
Immaculate inning (9 pitches, 9 strikes, side retired)	104	Baseball Almanac
No-hitter	313	

== Collective pitching ==
- 26 strikeouts by one team in a game of any length. Number of occurrences: 4. New York Mets, August 23, 2019 (in a 14-inning game); Los Angeles Dodgers, June 2, 2017 (in a 12-inning game); Chicago Cubs, May 7, 2017 (in an 18-inning game); and California Angels, July 9, 1971 (in a 20-inning game).
- 21 strikeouts by one team in a 9-inning game (regular season or postseason). Cleveland Guardians against the Chicago White Sox in Game 5 of the 2026 American League Division Series
- Most strikeouts in a game of any length by both teams. 48 in an 18-inning game between the Cubs and Yankees on May 7, 2017

== Scoring ==
- Highest combined score: 49. Chicago Cubs (26) over Philadelphia Phillies (23), August 25, 1922.
- Highest score, one team: 36. Chicago Colts (36) vs. Louisville Colonels (7), June 29, 1897.

== Fielding ==
- Team executes two triple plays in a game. Number of occurrences: 1. Minnesota Twins, July 17, 1990.
- Shortstop plays doubleheader without an official chance. Number of occurrences: 1. Toby Harrah, June 25, 1976.
- Unassisted triple play. Number of occurrences: 15. Most recently, Eric Bruntlett, August 23, 2009.
- Three errors on one play. Number of occurrences: 5. Most recently committed by the Kansas City Royals while playing the New York Mets, July 7, 2026. With two runners already on base, Pitcher Seth Lugo fielded a hit by Carson Benge, throwing to Jac Caglianone at first base. Caglianone could not catch the ball and it continued past him into foul territory, allowing a run to score. Caglianone recovered the ball, then attempted a throw toward third to prevent another runner from attempting to score. The throw was not catchable by third baseman Nick Loftin and it again sailed into foul territory, prompting Bo Bichette to make an attempt to score. Lugo retrieved the ball and threw it to home in an attempt to stop Bichette's score, but catcher Carter Jensen missed that catch, allowing Bichette's run and prompting Benge to score as well. The Royals went on to win the game 16–12.

== Baserunning ==
Event	# of occurrences	References
Two triple steals by the same team in a game	1^{i}	Baseball Almanac
A single baserunner caught stealing 4 times in a game	1^{j}	Baseball Almanac
8 stolen bases by a team in a single inning	2	Baseball Almanac
Home stolen 3 times by the same team in a game	5	Baseball Almanac
A single baserunner caught stealing twice in a single inning	10	Baseball Almanac
Home stolen twice by a single baserunner in a game	11	Baseball Almanac
One player stealing second, third, and home in a single inning	53	Baseball Almanac

== See also ==
- Baseball record holders
