= Heinie Mueller =

Heinie Mueller is the name of:

- Heinie Mueller (outfielder) (1899–1975), Major League Baseball outfielder from 1920 to 1935
- Heinie Mueller (second baseman) (1912–1986), Major League Baseball infielder from 1938 to 1941
