= List of Major League Baseball players with a home run in their first major league at bat =

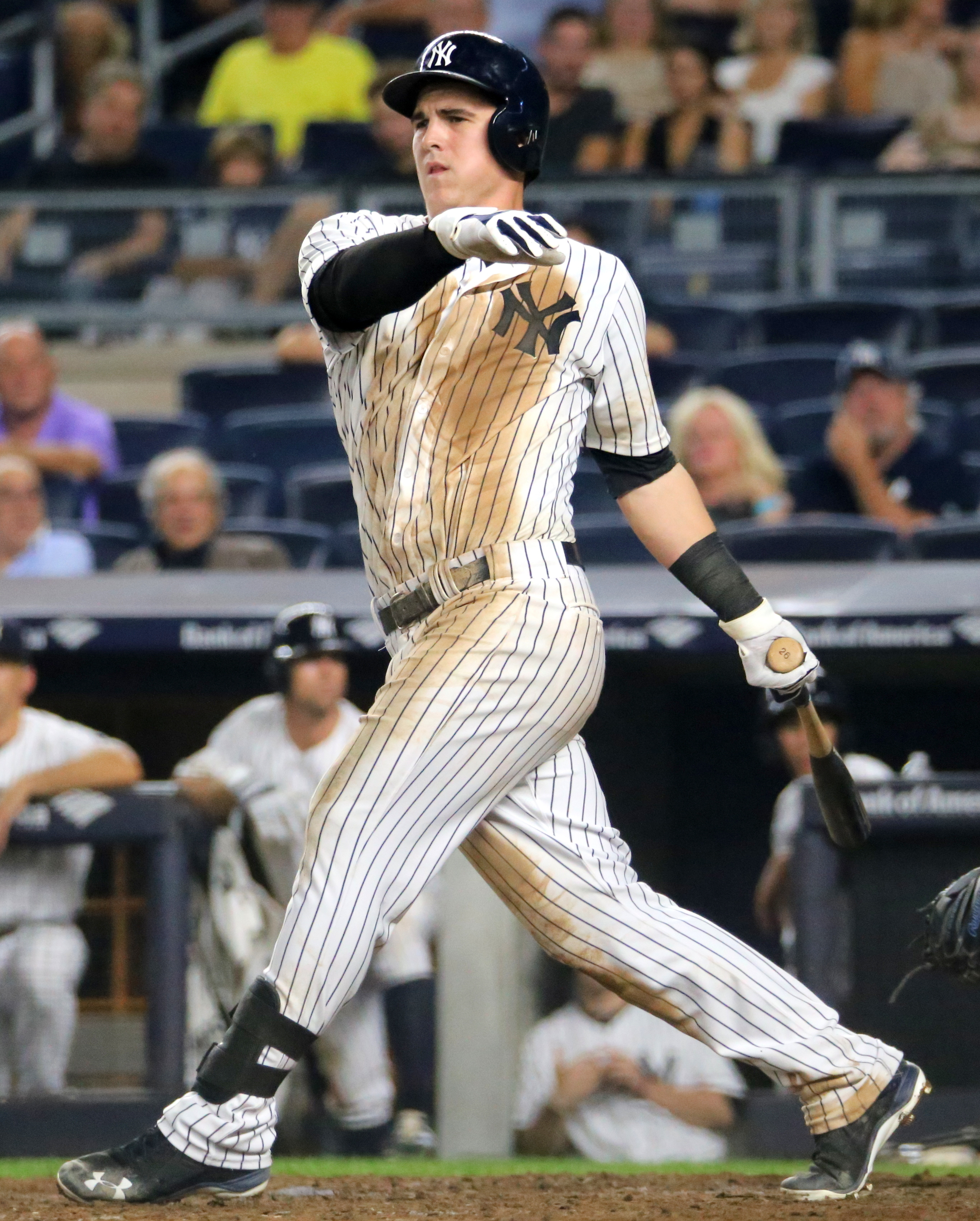
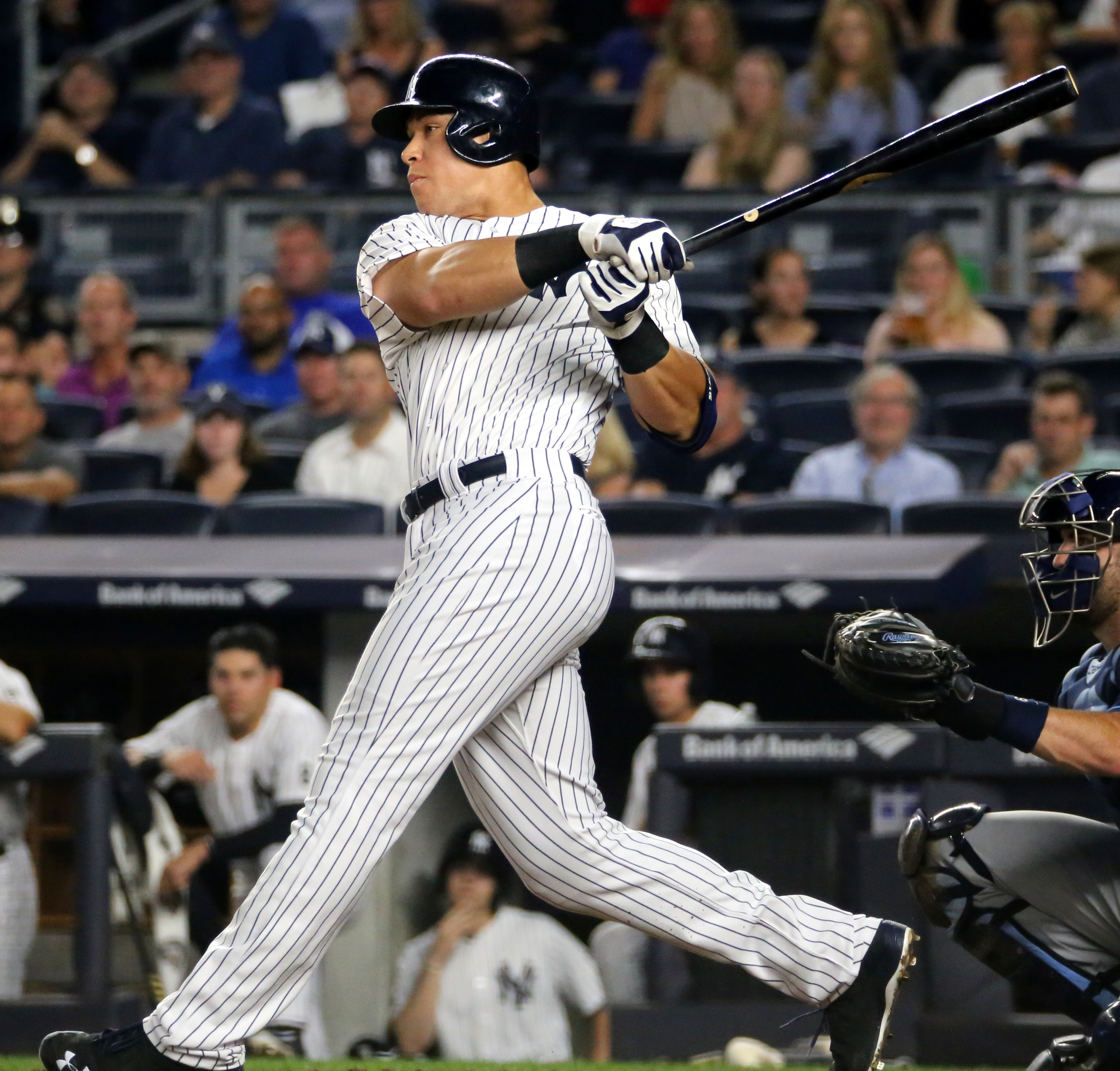
Tyler Austin (left) and Aaron Judge (right) are the only teammates to homer in their first major league at bats in the same game and to accomplish this in back-to-back at bats.

In baseball, a home run is credited to a batter when they hit a fair ball and reach home safely on the same play, without the benefit of an error. 146 players have hit a home run in their first at bat of a Major League Baseball (MLB) game, (Note: MLB recognizes National League and American League statistics since their founding in 1876 and 1901, respectively. Also, statistics from several defunct leagues (such as the American Association) have been retroactively recognized by MLB. See also: Major League Baseball#Other recognized leagues.) the most recent being Emmanuel Rodriquez on September 12, 2026. George Tebeau and Mike Griffin both hit home runs in their first at bats on April 16, 1887. These players are recognized together as the first player to homer in his first major league at bat because it is unknown which one hit first.

Luke Stuart, Walter Mueller, and Johnnie LeMaster hit inside-the-park home runs in their first at bats. Bill Duggleby, Jeremy Hermida, Kevin Kouzmanoff and Daniel Nava hit grand slams in their first at bats—Kouzmanoff and Nava doing so on the first pitch. Ernie Koy and Heinie Mueller were the first players to accomplish the feat in the same game, doing so for the Brooklyn Dodgers and Philadelphia Phillies, respectively, in the first inning of Opening Day in 1938. This was equalled in 2016 by Tyler Austin and Aaron Judge, who became the only players to achieve the feat as teammates (playing for the New York Yankees) and in back-to-back at bats. Three players, Bob Nieman, Keith McDonald and Joshua Báez, each homered in their second at bat also (with Nieman and Báez each hitting both within their first game). Of those, Joshua Báez is the only player to have homered in his first three at bats. Paul Gillespie and John Miller are the only players to hit home runs in both their first and last major league at bats; for Miller these were the only two home runs of his MLB career. For 25 players, their first at bat home run was the only home run of their major league careers.

Of the 31 players eligible for the Baseball Hall of Fame who have hit a home run in their first major league at bat, two – Earl Averill and Hoyt Wilhelm – have been elected, neither of them on the first ballot. Players are eligible for the Hall of Fame if they have played in at least 10 MLB seasons, and have either been retired for five seasons or deceased for at least six months. These requirements leave 26 players ineligible who are active and 87 players ineligible who did not play in 10 seasons. (Note: The Baseball-Reference.com profiles of each player verify their active status and service time.)

== Players ==
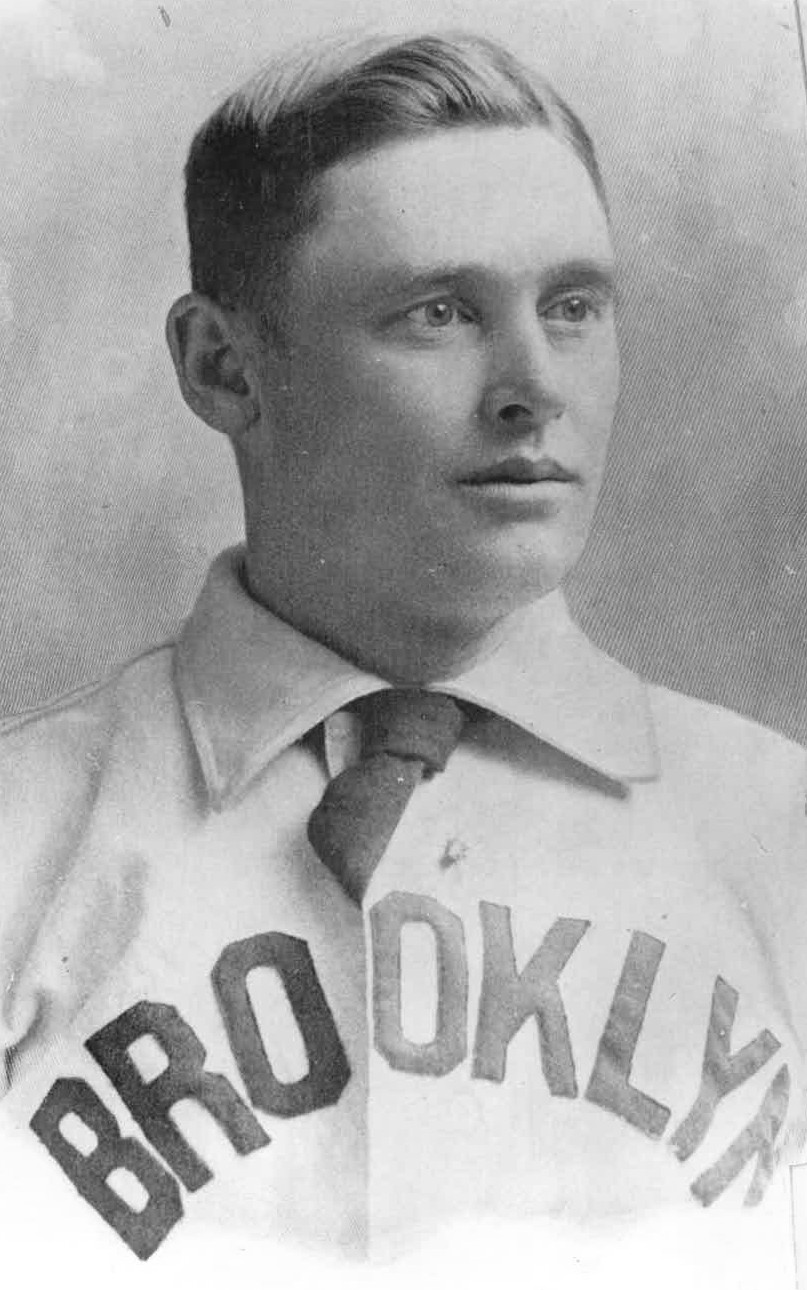
Mike Griffin was one of the first two players to hit a home run in their first major league at bat.

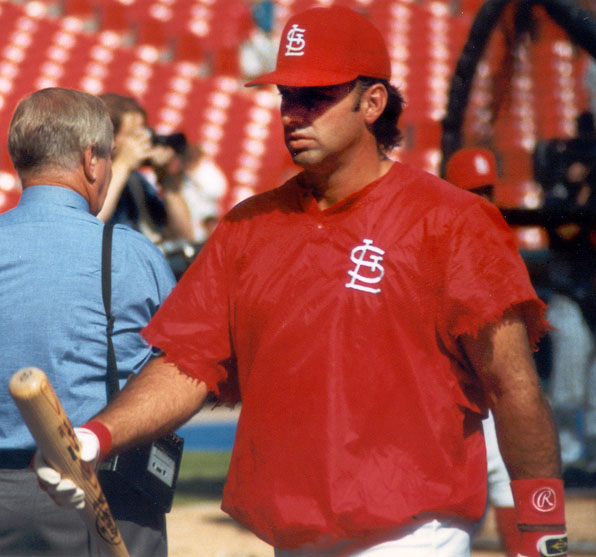
Gary Gaetti had the most career home runs among the players who hit a home run in their first MLB at bat until the record was broken by Aaron Judge in 2025.

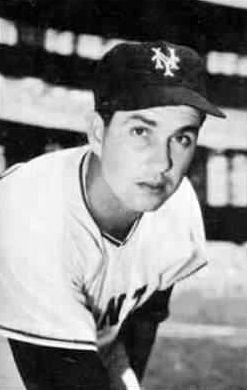
Hall of Fame pitcher Hoyt Wilhelm homered in his first MLB at bat, and is one of 23 players to never hit another home run in their major league career.

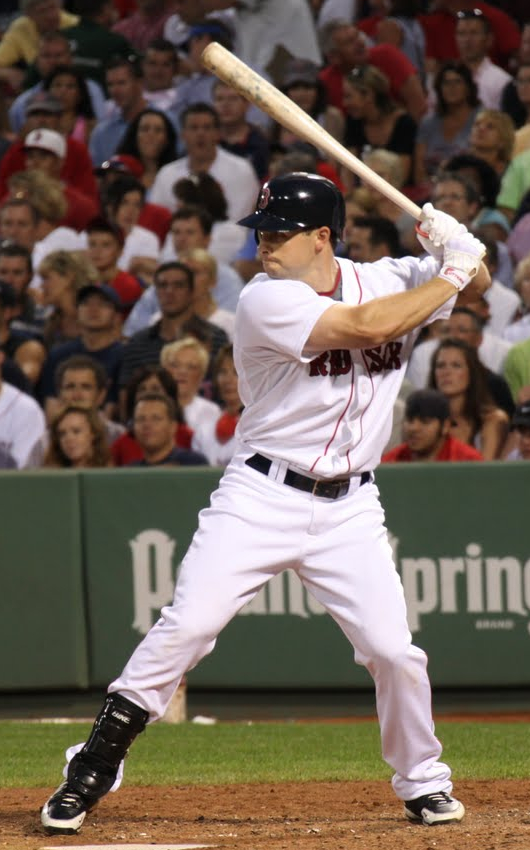
Daniel Nava is one of four players to hit a grand slam in his first MLB at bat, and one of two to hit it on the first pitch.

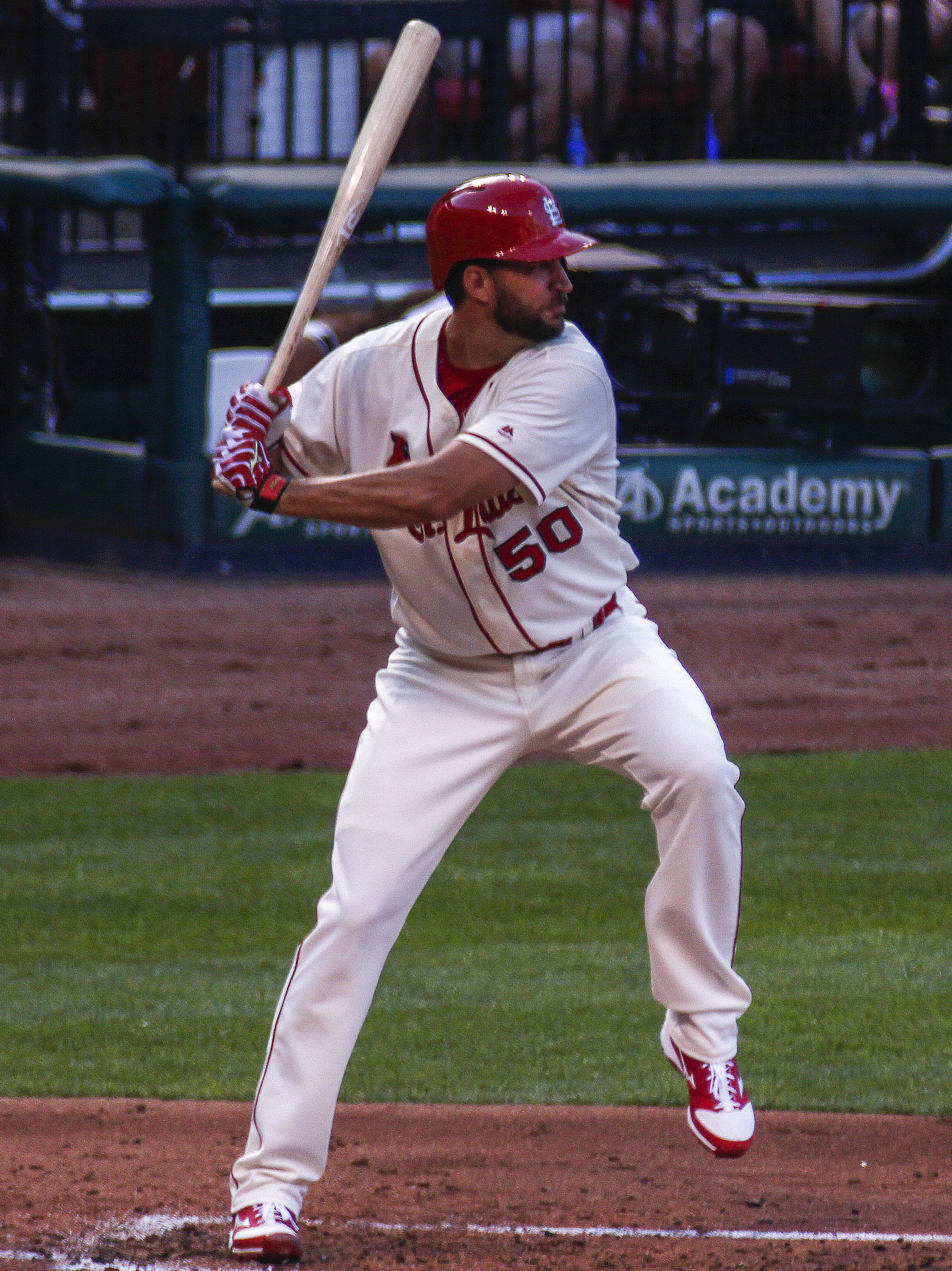
Adam Wainwright is one of 19 pitchers to homer in their first major league at bat.

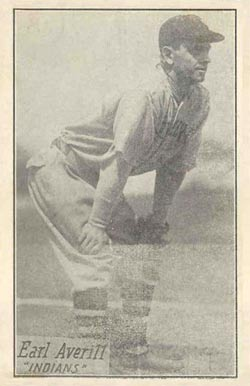
Earl Averill is one of only two Hall of Famers to homer in his first major league at bat.

Key
Player	Name of the player
Date	Date of the game
Team	The player's team at the time of the game
NL	National League
AL	American League
AA	American Association
Career HR	The number of home runs the player hit in his MLB career
Box	Box score with play by play (if available)
*	Indicates the player was a pitcher
#	Indicates the home run was hit on the first pitch the player faced in his MLB career
ℓ	Indicates the home run was a grand slam
↑	Indicates the home run was hit as a pinch hitter
&	Indicates game in which multiple players homered in their first major league at bat
Mars symbol	Indicates the home runs were hit in consecutive at bats
†	Elected to the Baseball Hall of Fame
‡	Player is active

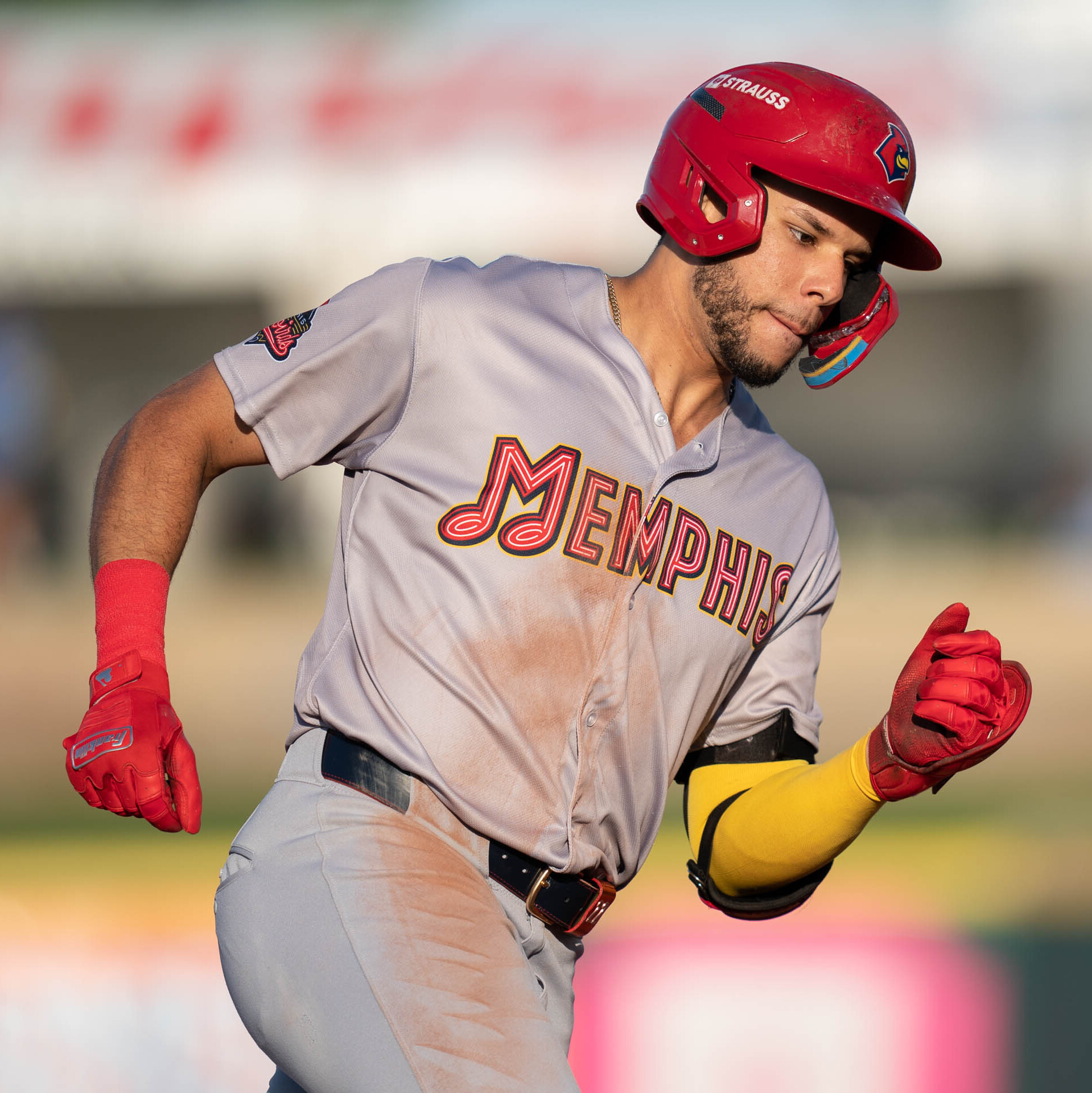
Joshua Báez became the first player to homer in each of his first three MLB at bats.

MLB hitters with a home run in their first major league at bat
Player	Date	Team	League	Career HR	Box	Ref(s)
George Tebeau	April 16, 1887	Cincinnati Red Stockings	AA	15	—N/a	
Mike Griffin	April 16, 1887	Baltimore Orioles	AA	42	—N/a	
Billy Gumbert*	June 19, 1890	Pittsburgh Alleghenys	NL	1	—N/a	
Joe Harrington	September 10, 1895	Boston Beaneaters	NL	3	—N/a	
Bill Duggleby*^{ℓ}	April 21, 1898	Philadelphia Phillies	NL	6	—N/a	
Johnny Bates	April 12, 1906	Boston Beaneaters	NL	25		
Luke Stuart	August 8, 1921	St. Louis Browns	AL	1		
Walter Mueller^{#}	May 7, 1922	Pittsburgh Pirates	NL	2		
Earl Averill^{†}	April 16, 1929	Cleveland Indians	AL	238		
Clise Dudley*^{#}	April 27, 1929	Brooklyn Robins	NL	3		
Gordon Slade	May 24, 1930	Brooklyn Robins	NL	8		
Eddie Morgan^{#↑}	April 14, 1936	St. Louis Cardinals	NL	1		
Ace Parker^{↑}	April 30, 1937	Philadelphia Athletics	AL	2		
Gene Hasson	September 9, 1937	Philadelphia Athletics	AL	4		
Ernie Koy	April 19, 1938^{&}	Brooklyn Dodgers	NL	36		
Heinie Mueller	April 19, 1938^{&}	Philadelphia Phillies	NL	17		
Bill LeFebvre*^{#}	June 10, 1938	Boston Red Sox	AL	1		
Clyde Vollmer^{#}	May 31, 1942	Cincinnati Reds	NL	69		
Paul Gillespie	September 11, 1942	Chicago Cubs	NL	6		
Buddy Kerr	September 8, 1943	New York Giants	NL	31		
Hack Miller	April 23, 1944	Detroit Tigers	AL	1		
Whitey Lockman	July 5, 1945	New York Giants	NL	114		
Eddie Pellagrini	April 22, 1946	Boston Red Sox	AL	20		
Dan Bankhead*	August 26, 1947	Brooklyn Dodgers	NL	1		
George Vico^{#}	April 20, 1948	Detroit Tigers	AL	12		
Les Layton^{↑}	May 21, 1948	New York Giants	NL	2		
Ed Sanicki	September 14, 1949	Philadelphia Phillies	NL	3		
Ted Tappe^{↑}	September 14, 1950	Cincinnati Reds	NL	5		
Bob Nieman	September 14, 1951	St. Louis Browns	AL	125		
Hoyt Wilhelm^{†}*	April 23, 1952	New York Giants	NL	1		
Wally Moon	April 13, 1954	St. Louis Cardinals	NL	142		
Chuck Tanner^{#↑}	April 12, 1955	Milwaukee Braves	NL	21		
Bill White	May 7, 1956	New York Giants	NL	202		
Frank Ernaga	May 24, 1957	Chicago Cubs	NL	2		
Don Leppert	June 18, 1961	Pittsburgh Pirates	NL	15		
Cuno Barragan	September 1, 1961	Chicago Cubs	NL	1		
Bob Tillman	May 19, 1962 (Note: Bob Tillman walked in his first two plate appearances (in the top of the 2nd inning on May 19, 1962, and as a pinch hitter on April 15, 1962). These do not count as at bats.)	Boston Red Sox	AL	79		
John Kennedy^{↑}	September 5, 1962	Washington Senators	AL	32		
Buster Narum*	May 3, 1963 (Note: MLB.com incorrectly lists the date of Narum's home run in his first MLB at bat as May 5, 1963. He in fact hit the home run on May 3, 1963, as confirmed by Baseball Almanac and Baseball-Reference.com.)	Baltimore Orioles	AL	3		
Gates Brown^{↑}	June 19, 1963	Detroit Tigers	AL	84		
Bert Campaneris^{#}	July 23, 1964	Kansas City Athletics	AL	79		
Bill Roman^{↑}	September 30, 1964	Detroit Tigers	AL	1		
Brant Alyea^{#↑}	September 12, 1965	Washington Senators	AL	38		
John Miller	September 11, 1966	New York Yankees	AL	2		
Rick Renick	July 11, 1968	Minnesota Twins	AL	20		
Joe Keough^{↑}	August 7, 1968	Oakland Athletics	AL	9		
Gene Lamont	September 2, 1970	Detroit Tigers	AL	4		
Don Rose*^{#}	May 24, 1972	California Angels	AL	1		
Benny Ayala	August 27, 1974	New York Mets	NL	38		
Reggie Sanders	September 1, 1974	Detroit Tigers	AL	3		
John Montefusco*	September 3, 1974 (Note: John Montefusco walked in his first plate appearance in the top of the 2nd inning. This does not count as an at bat.)	San Francisco Giants	NL	4		
José Sosa*	July 30, 1975	Houston Astros	NL (Note: The Houston Astros were part of the National League until the 2012 season, after which they moved to the American League.)	1		
Dave McKay	August 22, 1975	Minnesota Twins	AL	21		
Johnnie LeMaster	September 2, 1975	San Francisco Giants	NL	22		
Alvis Woods^{↑}	April 7, 1977	Toronto Blue Jays	AL	35		
Dave Machemer	June 21, 1978	California Angels	AL	1		
Tim Wallach	September 6, 1980 (Note: Tim Wallach walked in his first plate appearance in the top of the 5th inning. This does not count as an at bat.)	Montreal Expos	NL	260		
Gary Gaetti	September 20, 1981	Minnesota Twins	AL	360		
Carmelo Martínez	August 22, 1983 (Note: Carmelo Martínez walked in his first plate appearance in the bottom of the 3rd inning. This does not count as an at bat.)	Chicago Cubs	NL	108		
Mike Fitzgerald	September 13, 1983	New York Mets	NL	48		
Andre David	June 29, 1984	Minnesota Twins	AL	1		
Will Clark	April 8, 1986	San Francisco Giants	NL	284		
Terry Steinbach	September 12, 1986	Oakland Athletics	AL	162		
Jay Bell^{#}	September 29, 1986	Cleveland Indians	AL	195		
Ricky Jordan	July 17, 1988 (Note: Ricky Jordan walked in his first plate appearance in the bottom of the 2nd inning. This does not count as an at bat. Even though Jordan homered on the first pitch of his first at bat, he is not counted as having homered on the first career pitch he faced in the major leagues because he had already faced five pitches in the aforementioned first plate appearance.)	Philadelphia Phillies	NL	55		
Junior Félix^{#}	May 4, 1989	Toronto Blue Jays	AL	55		
José Offerman	August 19, 1990	Los Angeles Dodgers	NL	57		
Dave Eiland*	April 10, 1992	San Diego Padres	NL	1		
Jim Bullinger*^{#}	June 8, 1992	Chicago Cubs	NL	4		
Jay Gainer^{#}	May 14, 1993	Colorado Rockies	NL	3		
Mitch Lyden	June 16, 1993	Florida Marlins	NL	1		
Garey Ingram^{↑}	May 19, 1994	Los Angeles Dodgers	NL	3		
Jon Nunnally	April 29, 1995	Kansas City Royals	AL	42		
Jermaine Dye	May 17, 1996	Atlanta Braves	NL	325		
Dustin Hermanson*	April 16, 1997	Montreal Expos	NL	2		
Brad Fullmer^{↑}	September 2, 1997	Montreal Expos	NL	114		
Marlon Anderson^{↑}	September 8, 1998	Philadelphia Phillies	NL	63		
Carlos Lee	May 7, 1999	Chicago White Sox	AL	358		
Guillermo Mota*	June 9, 1999	Montreal Expos	NL	2		
Esteban Yan*^{#}	June 4, 2000	Tampa Bay Devil Rays	AL	1		
Alex Cabrera^{↑}	June 26, 2000	Arizona Diamondbacks	NL	5		
Keith McDonald^{↑}	July 4, 2000	St. Louis Cardinals	NL	3		
Chris Richard^{#}	July 17, 2000	St. Louis Cardinals	NL	34		
Gene Stechschulte*^{#↑}	April 17, 2001 (Note: The MLB.com article titled "Players with home run in first at-bat" incorrectly lists the date of Stechschulte's home run in his first MLB at bat as April 1, 2001. He in fact did not play on that day and hit the home run on April 17, 2001, as confirmed by Baseball Almanac and Baseball-Reference.com.)	St. Louis Cardinals	NL	1		
Marcus Thames^{#}	June 10, 2002	New York Yankees	AL	115		
Miguel Olivo	September 15, 2002	Chicago White Sox	AL	145		
Dave Matranga^{↑}	June 27, 2003	Houston Astros	NL	1		
Kazuo Matsui^{#}	April 6, 2004	New York Mets	NL	32		
Héctor Luna	April 8, 2004	St. Louis Cardinals	NL	15		
Greg Dobbs^{↑}	September 8, 2004	Seattle Mariners	AL	46		
Andy Phillips^{#↑}	September 26, 2004	New York Yankees	AL	14		
Mike Jacobs^{↑}	August 21, 2005	New York Mets	NL	100		
Jeremy Hermida^{ℓ↑}	August 31, 2005	Florida Marlins	NL	65		
Mike Napoli	May 4, 2006	Los Angeles Angels	AL	267		
Adam Wainwright*^{#}	May 24, 2006	St. Louis Cardinals	NL	10		
Kevin Kouzmanoff^{#ℓ}	September 2, 2006	Cleveland Indians	AL	87		
Charlton Jimerson^{↑}	September 4, 2006	Houston Astros	NL	2		
Josh Fields^{↑}	September 18, 2006	Chicago White Sox	AL	34		
Elijah Dukes	April 2, 2007 (Note: Elijah Dukes walked in his first plate appearance in the top of the 2nd inning. This does not count as an at bat.)	Tampa Bay Devil Rays	AL	31		
Mark Worrell*	June 5, 2008	St. Louis Cardinals	NL	1		
Lou Montañez	August 6, 2008 (Note: Both MLB.com and Baseball-Reference.com list Lou Montañez's debut as April 28, 2008, in a suspended game that was subsequently resumed and completed on August 25, 2008. Although Montañez only entered the game as a pinch hitter on the latter date, the game is recorded as having been played on the day it started (April 28). The Elias Sports Bureau still credits Montañez with a home run in his first MLB at bat, however, because he was not in the major leagues on April 28.)	Baltimore Orioles	AL	5		
Mark Saccomanno^{#↑}	September 8, 2008	Houston Astros	NL	1		
Jordan Schafer	April 5, 2009	Atlanta Braves	NL	12		
Gerardo Parra	May 13, 2009	Arizona Diamondbacks	NL	90		
John Hester^{↑}	August 28, 2009	Arizona Diamondbacks	NL	6		
Jason Heyward	April 5, 2010	Atlanta Braves	NL	186		
Luke Hughes	April 28, 2010	Minnesota Twins	AL	8		
Starlin Castro	May 7, 2010	Chicago Cubs	NL	138		
Daniel Nava^{#ℓ}	June 12, 2010	Boston Red Sox	AL	29		
J. P. Arencibia^{#}	August 7, 2010	Toronto Blue Jays	AL	80		
Brandon Guyer	May 6, 2011	Tampa Bay Rays	AL	32		
Tommy Milone*^{#}	September 3, 2011	Washington Nationals	NL	1		
Brett Pill	September 6, 2011	San Francisco Giants	NL	9		
Starling Marte^{‡#}	July 26, 2012	Pittsburgh Pirates	NL	165		
Eddy Rodríguez	August 2, 2012	San Diego Padres	NL	1		
Jurickson Profar^{‡}	September 2, 2012	Texas Rangers	AL	125		
Jorge Soler^{‡}	August 27, 2014	Chicago Cubs	NL	215		
Eddie Rosario^{‡#}	May 6, 2015	Minnesota Twins	AL	169		
Daniel Norris*	August 19, 2015	Detroit Tigers	AL	1		
Willson Contreras^{‡#↑}	June 19, 2016	Chicago Cubs	NL	199		
Tyler Austin	August 13, 2016^{&}	New York Yankees	AL	33		
Aaron Judge^{‡}	August 13, 2016^{&}	New York Yankees	AL	386		
Paul DeJong^{‡↑}	May 28, 2017	St. Louis Cardinals	NL	146		
Lane Thomas^{‡↑}	April 19, 2019	St. Louis Cardinals	NL	87		
Zack Collins	June 21, 2019 (Note: Zack Collins appeared as a pinch hitter on June 19, 2019, and drew a walk. This counted only as a plate appearance and a game played, but not as an at bat.)	Chicago White Sox	AL	11		
Tyler Stephenson^{‡}	July 27, 2020	Cincinnati Reds	NL	78		
Keibert Ruiz^{‡}	August 16, 2020	Los Angeles Dodgers	NL	54		
Sergio Alcántara^{‡}	September 6, 2020	Detroit Tigers	AL	12		
Akil Baddoo^{‡}^{#}	April 4, 2021	Detroit Tigers	AL	28		
Seth Beer^{‡}	September 10, 2021	Arizona Diamondbacks	NL	2		
Joe Dunand	May 7, 2022	Miami Marlins	NL	1		
Christopher Morel^{‡↑}	May 17, 2022	Chicago Cubs	NL	75		
James Outman^{‡↑}	July 31, 2022	Los Angeles Dodgers	NL	39		
Brett Baty^{‡}	August 17, 2022	New York Mets	NL	44		
Spencer Steer^{‡}	September 2, 2022	Cincinnati Reds	NL	82		
Josh Jung^{‡}	September 9, 2022	Texas Rangers	AL	61		
Davis Schneider^{‡}	August 4, 2023	Toronto Blue Jays	AL	37		
Weston Wilson^{‡}	August 9, 2023	Philadelphia Phillies	NL	13		
Jasson Domínguez^{‡}	September 1, 2023	New York Yankees	AL	22		
Jhonkensy Noel^{‡}	June 26, 2024	Cleveland Guardians	AL	19		
Matt Gorski^{‡}	April 24, 2025	Pittsburgh Pirates	NL	2		
Zach Cole^{‡}^{#}	September 12, 2025	Houston Astros	AL	7		
Félix Reyes^{‡}	April 18, 2026	Philadelphia Phillies	NL	1		
Eduardo Valencia^{‡}^{↑}	July 9, 2026	Detroit Tigers	AL	8		
Joshua Báez^{‡}^{#}	August 15, 2026	St. Louis Cardinals	NL	7		

== See also ==
- List of Major League Baseball players with a home run in their final major league at bat
