= Heinie Mueller (second baseman) =

American baseball player (1912–1986)

- Second baseman
- Born: July 20, 1912; St. Louis, Missouri, U.S.
- Died: October 3, 1986 (aged 74); Orlando, Florida, U.S.
- Batted: Switch Threw: Right

MLB debut
- April 19, 1938, for the Philadelphia Phillies

Last MLB appearance
- September 28, 1941, for the Philadelphia Phillies

MLB statistics
- Batting average: .253
- Home runs: 17
- Runs batted in: 127
- Stats at Baseball Reference

Teams
- Philadelphia Phillies (1938–1941)

Emmett Jerome "Heinie" Mueller (July 20, 1912 – October 3, 1986) was an American Major League Baseball player for the Philadelphia Phillies from 1938 to 1941.

Born in St. Louis, Missouri, Mueller originally signed as an infielder with the St. Louis Cardinals’ organization. Before reaching the major leagues, Mueller played with Springfield in the Western Association and in 1935 and 1936 with Houston.

== Historic first at-bat ==
In December 1937, the Cardinals sold Mueller to the Philadelphia Phillies. Mueller became the Phillies starting second baseman in 1938. In his major league debut on Opening Day, April 19, 1938, he became the first player in history to hit a leadoff home run in his first major league at-bat. (No other Phillie would hit a leadoff homer on Opening Day until César Hernández in 2017.) Amazingly, in the very same game, Ernie Koy, from the opposing Brooklyn Dodgers, also hit a home run in his very first Major League at-bat. This game remains one of only two in Major League history in which multiple players hit home runs in their first ever at-bat (the other occurring on August 13, 2016, when teammates Tyler Austin and Aaron Judge hit their home runs in consecutive debut at-bats).

Interestingly, the first Major League ballplayer ever to hit a home run on the very first pitch in their first at bat is named Walter Mueller; it is unclear whether the two ballplayers are related, although coincidentally, Walter did have a brother, also named Heinie Mueller, who himself played in the Major Leagues.

== Overall career ==
In four seasons with the Phillies, Mueller was primarily a second baseman (225 of his 441 games), but he also appeared as a pinch hitter, third baseman, outfielder, first baseman, and shortstop. In 441 major league games, Mueller collected 324 hits, scored 144 runs, knocked in 127 runs, walked 156 times, and stole 10 bases. He compiled a career batting average of .253 and a .337 on-base percentage.

Mueller joined the U.S. Army shortly after Pearl Harbor. He was stationed at Jefferson Barracks, Missouri, where he played baseball for the Reception Center Missions. A highlight at the time was playing for military all-star team which defeated an American League all-star team, 5–0, on July 7, 1942, at Cleveland's Municipal Stadium before a crowd of 62,059.

After the war, Mueller attended the Phillies spring training in 1946. Having missed four seasons to military service, Mueller did not make the cut and was released by the Phillies on April 22, 1946. He continued to play in the minor leagues and later became a minor league player-manager, including a stint with the Muskogee Reds in the Western Association in 1949.

Mueller died in Orlando, Florida at age 74 in 1986. He is buried at Woodlawn Cemetery in Winter Garden, Florida.

== See also ==
- List of Major League Baseball players with a home run in their first major league at bat
