= Luke Stuart (baseball) =

American baseball player (1892-1947)

- Second baseman
- Born: May 23, 1892; Alamance County, North Carolina
- Died: June 15, 1947 (aged 55); Winston-Salem, North Carolina
- Batted: Right Threw: Right

MLB debut
- July 28, 1921, for the St. Louis Browns

Last MLB appearance
- August 9, 1921, for the St. Louis Browns

MLB statistics
- Batting average: .333
- Home runs: 1
- Runs batted in: 2
- Stats at Baseball Reference

Teams
- St. Louis Browns (1921)

Luther Lane Stuart (May 23, 1892 – June 15, 1947) was an American professional baseball player who appeared in three games as a second baseman in 1921 for the St. Louis Browns of Major League Baseball (MLB). Stuart became the first of three Major League players (the others being Walter Mueller and Johnnie LeMaster) to hit an inside-the-park home run in their first Major League Baseball at bat. It was Stuart's only hit in his three-game career. Stuart also became the first American League player to hit a home run in his first plate appearance. He worked as a scout for the New York Yankees after his playing career was over.

== Death ==
Stuart committed suicide on June 15, 1947, by slicing his wrists and then shooting himself with a pistol at a realtor's office after being in ill health.

== See also ==
- List of players with a home run in first major league at bat
