= George Tebeau =

American baseball player (1861–1923)

- Outfielder
- Born: December 26, 1861; St. Louis, Missouri, U.S.
- Died: February 4, 1923 (aged 61); Denver, Colorado, U.S.
- Batted: Right Threw: Right

MLB debut
- April 16, 1887, for the Cincinnati Red Stockings

Last MLB appearance
- September 29, 1895, for the Cleveland Spiders

MLB statistics
- Batting average: .269
- Home runs: 15
- Runs batted in: 311
- Stats at Baseball Reference

Teams
- Cincinnati Red Stockings (1887–1889); Toledo Maumees (1890); Washington Senators (1894); Cleveland Spiders (1894–1895)

George Tebeau (December 26, 1861 – February 4, 1923) was an American professional baseball player who played as an outfielder in Major League Baseball. He played in the big leagues between 1887 and 1895 for the Cincinnati Red Stockings (1887–1889) and Toledo Maumees (1890) of the American Association, and with the Washington Senators (1894) and Cleveland Spiders (1894–1895) of the National League. Tebeau batted and threw right-handed.

== Career ==
In a six-season career, Tebeau was a .269 lifetime hitter with 15 home runs and 311 runs batted in in 628 games played. Nicknamed "White Wings" initially due to the especially clean uniforms he wore, he retained the moniker on account of his speed. He totaled 228 stolen bases, 623 hits, 96 doubles, 54 triples, and 441 runs scored.

The older brother of infielder Patsy Tebeau, who was his teammate while in Cleveland, George played over 50 games at all three outfield positions and first base. One of his most productive seasons came in 1889 with Cincinnati, when he hit .252 and posted career-highs in stolen bases (61), RBI (70), runs (110), hits (110) and walks (69). He later became the owner of the Kansas City Blues franchise of the American Association.

In addition, Tebeau is recognized as the joint-first Major League Baseball player ever to hit a home run in the first at-bat of his career. He shares this "first ever" distinction with Mike Griffin; both Tebeau and Griffin hit their debut at-bat home runs on the same day, and as it is unclear which player hit his home run at a chronologically earlier time of the day, both have historically been considered the "first."

Tebeau died in Denver at the age of 61, in the midst of surgery for removal of a carbuncle from his neck, a result of diabetes-related issues.

== See also ==
- List of Major League Baseball players with a home run in their first major league at bat
- List of Major League Baseball career stolen bases leaders
