= Daniel Nava =

American baseball player (born 1983)

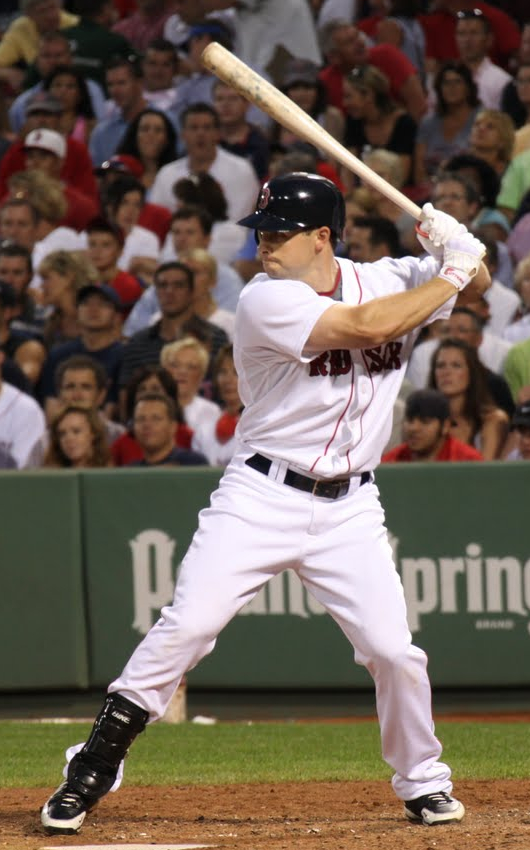
- Nava with the Boston Red Sox in 2010
- Outfielder
- Born: February 22, 1983 (age 43); Redwood City, California, U.S.
- Batted: Switch Threw: Left

MLB debut
- June 12, 2010, for the Boston Red Sox

Last MLB appearance
- September 3, 2017, for the Philadelphia Phillies

MLB statistics
- Batting average: .266
- Home runs: 29
- Runs batted in: 206
- Stats at Baseball Reference

Teams
- Boston Red Sox (2010, 2012–2015); Tampa Bay Rays (2015); Los Angeles Angels (2016); Kansas City Royals (2016); Philadelphia Phillies (2017)

Career highlights and awards
- World Series champion (2013)

Daniel James Nava (born February 22, 1983) is an American former professional baseball outfielder. He played in Major League Baseball (MLB) for the Boston Red Sox, Tampa Bay Rays, Los Angeles Angels, Kansas City Royals, and Philadelphia Phillies. Nava is only the fourth player in MLB history to hit a grand slam in his first major league at bat and the second to do it on the first pitch.

== Early life ==
Nava was born in Redwood City, California. He played baseball at St. Francis High School in Mountain View, California and received his psychology degree from Santa Clara University. He was 4 ft 8 in (1.42 m) and 70 pounds (32 kg) in his freshman year in high school and grew to 5 ft 5 in (1.65 m) and 150 pounds (68 kg) by his senior year.

After an opportunity to walk-on to the Santa Clara University baseball team, he failed to make the team as a player and became the team equipment manager.

He left Santa Clara after two years because he could no longer afford the tuition. He then enrolled in the College of San Mateo, a junior college. He tried out for the baseball team on the encouragement of an old friend he happened to run into at a gym. While at the College of San Mateo, he became a Junior College All-American. Later Santa Clara wanted him back and eventually offered him a full scholarship. He had a .395 batting average with a .494 on-base percentage (OBP) in his lone season with the Broncos, both tops in the West Coast Conference (WCC), and earned first-team All-WCC honors. He accrued 15 stolen bases without being caught, and he had more walks (31) than strikeouts (29).

== Professional career ==
=== Minor leagues ===
When Nava graduated from college, he went undrafted and signed with the Chico Outlaws of the Golden Baseball League. The Outlaws cut him after a tryout, only to bring him back a year later to fill a void. In 2007, Nava hit 12 home runs for the Outlaws, with a .371 batting average and a 1.100 on-base plus slugging (OPS). Nava was named the number one independent league prospect by Baseball America in 2007. The assistant director of pro scouting for the Boston Red Sox, Jared Porter, recommended the Sox sign Nava from the Chico Outlaws in 2007. The Red Sox paid the Outlaws $1 for the rights to Nava, with an agreement that the Outlaws would receive an additional $1,499 if the Red Sox kept Nava after spring training.

In 2008, Nava played for the Class A-Advanced Lancaster JetHawks and hit .341 with 10 home runs and 59 runs batted in (RBIs) in 85 games. His OPS was .948. In 2009, he hit .339 at the Class A-Advanced Salem Red Sox before being called up to the Double-A Portland Sea Dogs, where he batted .364 with four home runs and a 25-to-12 walk-to-strikeout ratio. His OPS was .991.

In 2010, Nava spent two months in Triple-A with the Pawtucket Red Sox. At that time he was quoted as saying, "I know I have the talent and the ability, and I can keep playing at the next level," he said. "If I didn't think I could, I would have been like, 'You know what? There's no point.' … I definitely thought I could perform and perform well. That's why I kept on going. Quitting's just not much of an option for me."

=== Boston Red Sox ===
==== 2010 ====
Nava made his Major League debut with the Boston Red Sox on June 12, 2010, at Fenway Park as the starting left fielder against the Philadelphia Phillies. He was called up to help with the team's outfield situation, with Jacoby Ellsbury and Jeremy Hermida on the disabled list (DL) and Josh Reddick optioned to the minor leagues for more playing time.

Taking the advice of Red Sox radio broadcaster Joe Castiglione, who before the game told him to swing as hard as he could on the first pitch because "that's the only first pitch in the majors you'll ever see," Nava did swing at the first pitch he saw and hit a grand slam off Phillies pitcher Joe Blanton into the Red Sox bullpen. Nava became only the fourth player to have hit a grand slam in his first at-bat, joining Bill Duggleby in 1898, Jeremy Hermida in 2005, and Kevin Kouzmanoff in 2006. Nava became only the second player, after Kouzmanoff, to do so on the first pitch of his major-league career, and the first player in Major League Baseball history to achieve a grand slam on his first-ever MLB career at-bat while in interleague play. His second at-bat, an inning later, was also with the bases loaded, but he struck out, losing the opportunity to become the only player to hit a grand slam in his first two at bats. He was the tenth player in Red Sox history to hit a home run in his first plate appearance with the club, the prior being Darnell McDonald on April 20, 2010, against the Texas Rangers. Creighton Gubanich was the only other player in Red Sox history to hit a grand slam for his first big league hit; however, it was not in Gubanich's first major league at-bat. Bill LeFebvre was the only other player in Red Sox history to hit a home run on the first pitch thrown to him in the big leagues, doing so June 10, 1938.

Due to his outstanding debut, Nava continued to start for the Red Sox. On June 17, he had his first three-hit game, two of those hits being doubles, against the Arizona Diamondbacks. Nava reached base safely in his first 13 MLB games.

Nava was sent back to Triple-A Pawtucket on July 22 to make room for Hermida, who came off the DL. He was recalled to Boston on August 2 to replace Mike Cameron, who was placed on the DL, then optioned two days later to make room for Ellsbury. On August 17, he was again recalled after Ellsbury re-injured his ribs.

==== 2011 ====
Nava was designated for assignment and removed from the Red Sox' 40-man roster on May 20, 2011. He passed through waivers unclaimed and was outrighted back to the Pawtucket Red Sox.

==== 2012 ====
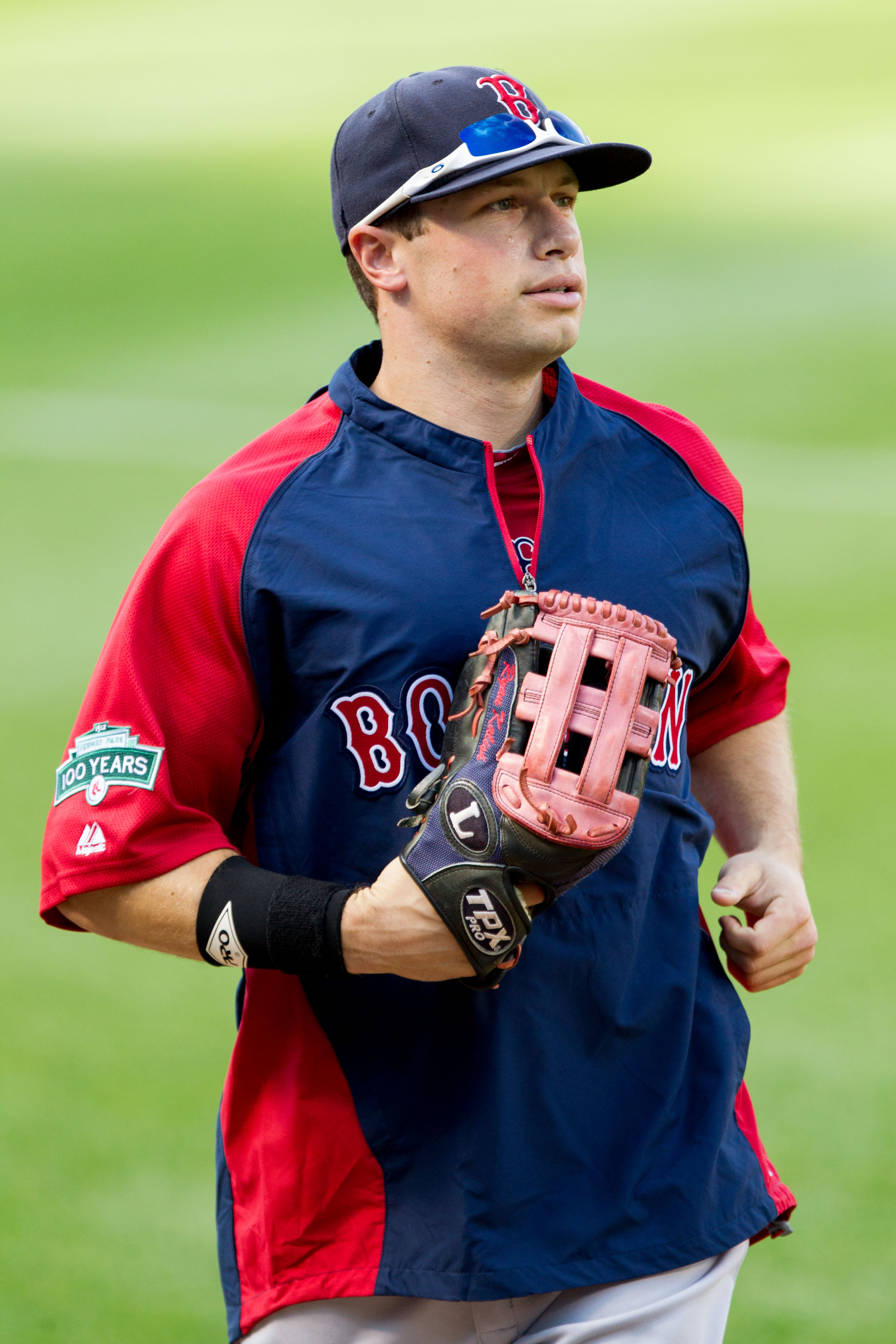
Nava with the Boston Red Sox in 2012

Nava was not invited to major league training camp in 2012, but was recalled to the major league in May of that year, due to the absences of Jacoby Ellsbury and Carl Crawford. Nava's debut grand slam was the only major league home run to his credit in his first 188 at bats, until May 14, 2012, when he hit a two-run home run for the Red Sox at Fenway Park against the Seattle Mariners. In 88 games played in 2012, Nava batted .243 with 6 home runs and 33 RBI. He was also the recipient of the Red Sox' Lou Gorman Award.

==== 2013 ====
Nava hit a three-run home run which proved to be the winning margin on April 20, the first Red Sox home game after the Boston Marathon bombing earlier that week. On July 29, 2013, Nava fell victim to a controversial call at home plate in which he was ruled out by umpire Jerry Meals, who later admitted that the call was incorrect.

Nava platooned with Jonny Gomes in left field throughout the Red Sox' championship season of 2013, posting career highs in games played and all offensive categories. He placed eighth in the American League in batting average (.303) and fifth (.385) in on-base percentage. The Red Sox finished atop the American League East division with a 97-65 record and went on to win the 2013 World Series over the St. Louis Cardinals.

==== 2014 ====
Nava batted only .136 with two home runs and three RBIs in the first 17 games in 2014. He was demoted to Triple-A Pawtucket on April 23, 2014. He was recalled on May 27, 2014, after Shane Victorino went on the disabled list. Nava still failed to improve and was again demoted to Triple-A on June 1, 2014. He was again recalled on June 2, 2014. On September 14, 2014, Nava hit his second career grand slam off of Kansas City Royals pitcher Aaron Crow.

==== 2015 ====
On July 30, 2015, Nava was designated for assignment after struggling throughout the season with injuries and inconsistency at the plate.

=== Tampa Bay Rays ===
Nava was claimed off waivers by the Tampa Bay Rays on August 5. He made his debut with the Rays two days later, facing the New York Mets and starting in right field. Batting 7th, he went 0 for 2, before being lifted for a pinch hitter. After the season, he was designated for assignment.

=== Los Angeles Angels ===
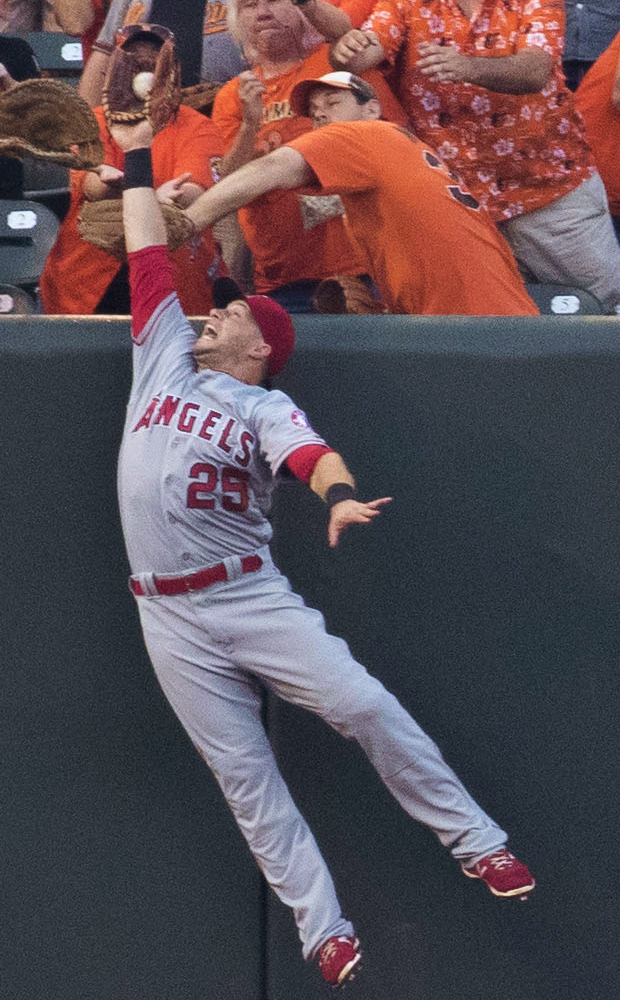
Nava playing for the Los Angeles Angels of Anaheim in 2016

Nava signed a one-year deal with the Los Angeles Angels of Anaheim on December 16, 2015. After spring training ended, Nava ended up on the 15-day DL. He was activated towards the end of May and, after struggling offensively and in a platoon role, the Angels designated him for assignment in July. He finished his tenure with the Angels hitting .235 with 1 home run in 45 games.

=== Kansas City Royals ===
On August 29, 2016, the Angels traded Nava to the Royals for a player to be named later.

=== Philadelphia Phillies ===
On December 12, 2016, Nava signed a minor league contract with the Philadelphia Phillies. He made the Phillies' major league roster, and in his first game with the team on April 6, 2017, he homered in his first two at-bats. He appeared in 80 games total for the 2017 Phillies, batting .301 with four home runs and 21 RBIs.

=== Pittsburgh Pirates ===
On February 6, 2018, Nava signed a minor league contract with the Pittsburgh Pirates. On February 28, it was announced Nava would be sidelined 10 to 12 weeks after back surgery. He was released on March 20, and signed a new minor league contract with Pittsburgh on March 23. Nava did not play professionally in 2018, and elected free agency following the season on November 2.

=== Kansas City T-Bones ===
On June 2, 2019, Nava signed with the Kansas City T-Bones of the independent American Association. During the 2019 season, he appeared in 71 games for the T-Bones, batting .288 with seven home runs and 46 RBIs. Nava was released by the T-Bones on March 5, 2020.

During the 2019–20 winter baseball season, Nava played briefly for Algodoneros de Guasave of the Mexican Pacific League, appearing in seven games while batting .148 (4-for-27) with one RBI.

== Coaching career ==
Nava was hired by the Los Angeles Dodgers organization as a coach in 2021. He managed the Arizona Complex League Dodgers during the 2021 season and was bench coach for the Rancho Cucamonga Quakes in 2022. In February 2023, Nava was named manager of the Dodgers' High-A affiliate, the Great Lakes Loons. The Loons posted the second-best record of the 2023 Midwest League season, and reached the league's championship game. Prior to the 2024 season, Nava was named outfield coordinator for the Dodgers' minor-league organization.

== Awards ==
- 2007 Independent Leagues Top Prospect (Baseball America)
- Red Sox Minor League Player of the Month (Aug/Sep 2009)
- Red Sox Lou Gorman Award (2012)

== Personal life ==
Nava's father, Don, is a fitness instructor and a coach. Nava was married in the early offseason of 2012; he and his wife, Rachel, have one daughter.

From 2008 to 2010, Nava left a ticket at every minor league home game for ESPN sportscaster Erin Andrews.

== See also ==
- List of Major League Baseball players with a home run in their first major league at bat

Awards
Preceded by Tommy Hottovy	Lou Gorman Award; 2012	Succeeded by Steven Wright
