= Paul Foytack =

American baseball pitcher (1930–2021)

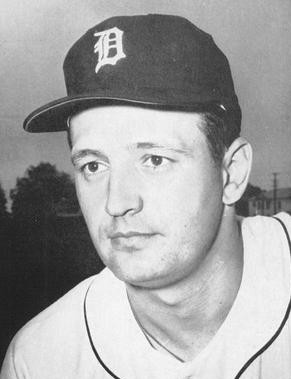
- Pitcher
- Born: November 16, 1930; Scranton, Pennsylvania, U.S.
- Died: January 23, 2021 (aged 90); Spring Hill, Tennessee, U.S.
- Batted: Right Threw: Right

MLB debut
- April 21, 1953, for the Detroit Tigers

Last MLB appearance
- May 7, 1964, for the Los Angeles Angels

MLB statistics
- Win–loss record: 86–87
- Earned run average: 4.14
- Strikeouts: 827
- Stats at Baseball Reference

Teams
- Detroit Tigers (1953, 1955–1963); Los Angeles Angels (1963–1964); Chunichi Dragons (1965)

Paul Eugene Foytack (November 16, 1930 – January 23, 2021) was an American professional baseball player and right-handed pitcher who appeared in 312 games in Major League Baseball between 1953 and 1964 for two American League clubs, the Detroit Tigers and the Los Angeles Angels. He also played one season in Nippon Professional Baseball for the 1965 Chunichi Dragons. Born in Scranton, Pennsylvania, Foytack was listed as 5 feet 11 inches (1.80 m) tall and 175 pounds (79 kg).

== Biography ==
Foytack signed with the Tigers in 1949 after graduating from Scranton Technical High School. He spent four years in the Detroit farm system before his first trial in the majors at the outset of the 1953 season. He made the Tigers' pitching staff in 1955, and from 1956 to 1959, he won 15, 14, 15, and 14 games respectively, averaging 40 games pitched and 33 games started. During that time, he was among the top ten pitchers in the American League in fewest hits allowed per nine innings three times, and also among the top ten in innings pitched (three times), strikeouts (three times), complete games (twice), and fewest walks per nine innings (once). In 1959, he led his league in games started in with 37. Over his 11-year MLB career, he posted a won–lost record of 86–87 with a 4.14 earned run average in 1,498 innings pitched, allowing 1,381 hits and 662 bases on balls and striking out 827. He notched 63 complete games and seven career shutouts as a starting pitcher, along with seven saves coming out of the bullpen.

On June 15, 1963, he was traded to the Angels with Frank Kostro for George Thomas and a minor league player to be named later. A month and a half later, on July 31, 1963, during the sixth inning of a game against the Cleveland Indians, Foytack became the first pitcher to give up home runs to four consecutive batters (Woodie Held, Pedro Ramos, Tito Francona, and Larry Brown). He was the only pitcher to suffer this distinction until New York Yankees rookie pitcher Chase Wright gave up four consecutive home runs to the Boston Red Sox on April 22, 2007.

Foytack was released by the Angels on May 15, 1964, ending his major league career. He spent the rest of that season at Triple-A Syracuse, back in the Tigers' organization, before his lone season in Japanese baseball.

Foytack died on January 23, 2021, in Spring Hill, Tennessee.

== See also ==
- List of rare baseball events
