= Keith McDonald (baseball) =

American baseball player (born 1973)

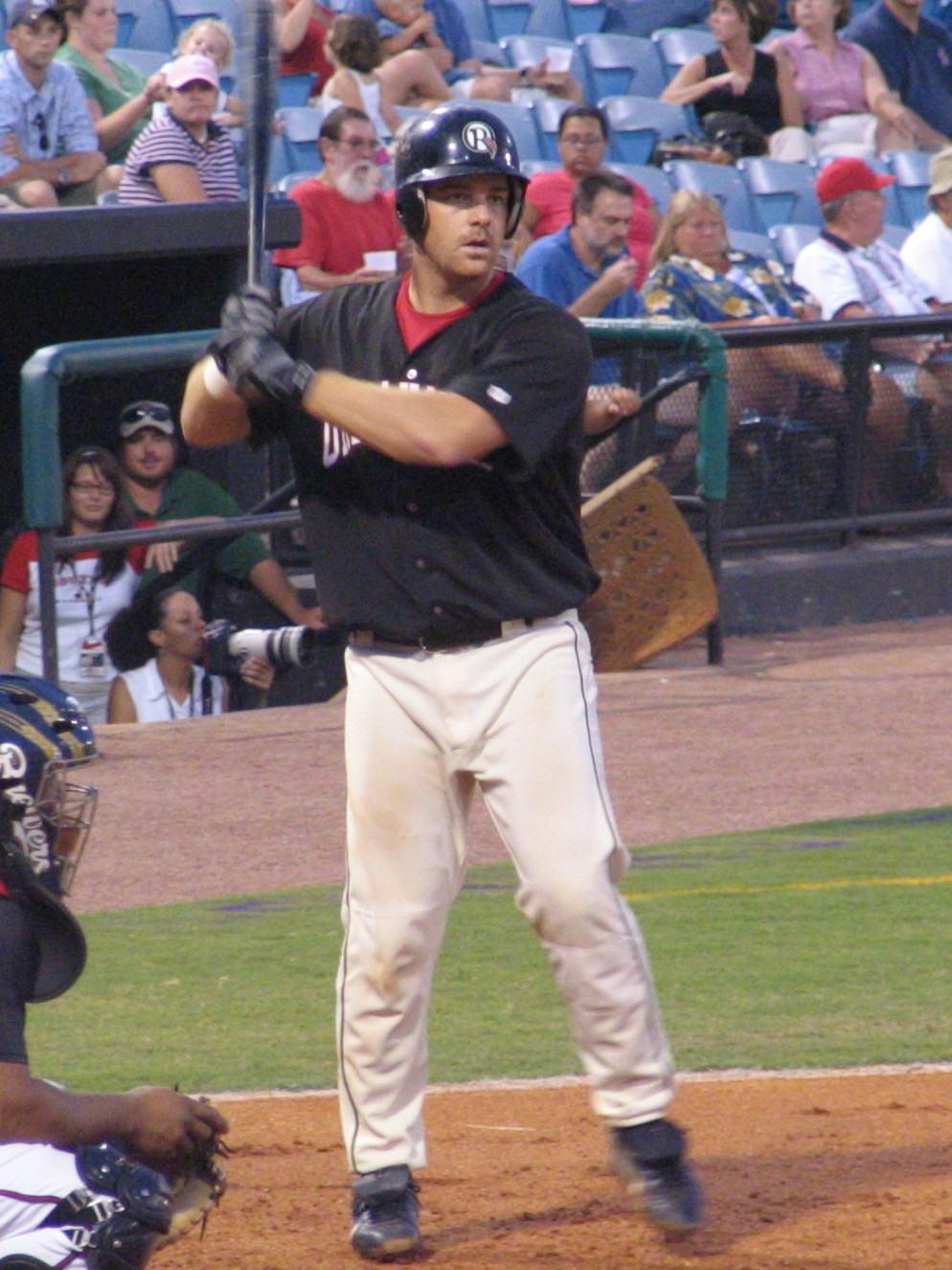
- McDonald with the Oklahoma RedHawks in 2005
- Catcher
- Born: February 8, 1973 (age 53); Yokosuka, Japan
- Batted: Right Threw: Right

MLB debut
- July 4, 2000, for the St. Louis Cardinals

Last MLB appearance
- September 28, 2001, for the St. Louis Cardinals

MLB statistics
- Batting average: .333
- Home runs: 3
- Runs batted in: 5
- Stats at Baseball Reference

Teams
- St. Louis Cardinals (2000–2001)

William Keith McDonald (born February 8, 1973) is a Japanese-born American former professional baseball catcher. He played in Major League Baseball (MLB) with the St. Louis Cardinals in 2000.

McDonald was born on the U.S. military base in Yokosuka, Japan, and attended Esperanza High School in Anaheim, California.

On July 4, 2000, McDonald became the third player in St. Louis history to hit a home run in his first major league at-bat. On July 6, he homered in his second at-bat, becoming only the second player in MLB history to hit home runs in each of his first two big league at bats. Bob Nieman was the first, hitting both of his home runs during the same debut game in 1951. McDonald went on to hit a third home run that year. McDonald has the most home runs of any MLB player not to have had any other hits. On August 15, 2026, Joshua Báez of the St. Louis Cardinals became the third player in MLB history to hit home runs in each of his first two career at-bats, joining McDonald and Nieman. Báez then homered in his third at-bat, becoming the first player in MLB history to hit home runs in each of his first three career at-bats and the first to hit three home runs in his major league debut. All three players accomplished their first two-at-bat home run feats with St. Louis teams.

In his first season McDonald batted .429 (3-7), with three homers, five RBI and three runs in six games. After playing for six games during the Cardinals' pursuit of the wild card, he was returned to their minor league farm team.

He returned the following season as a September call-up, and was hitless in two at-bats, after which he was again returned to the farm team. After moving through four other minor league teams, he ended his baseball career in 2006. As of 2022, he was working in the food industry.
