= Mike Griffin (outfielder) =

American baseball player (1865–1908)

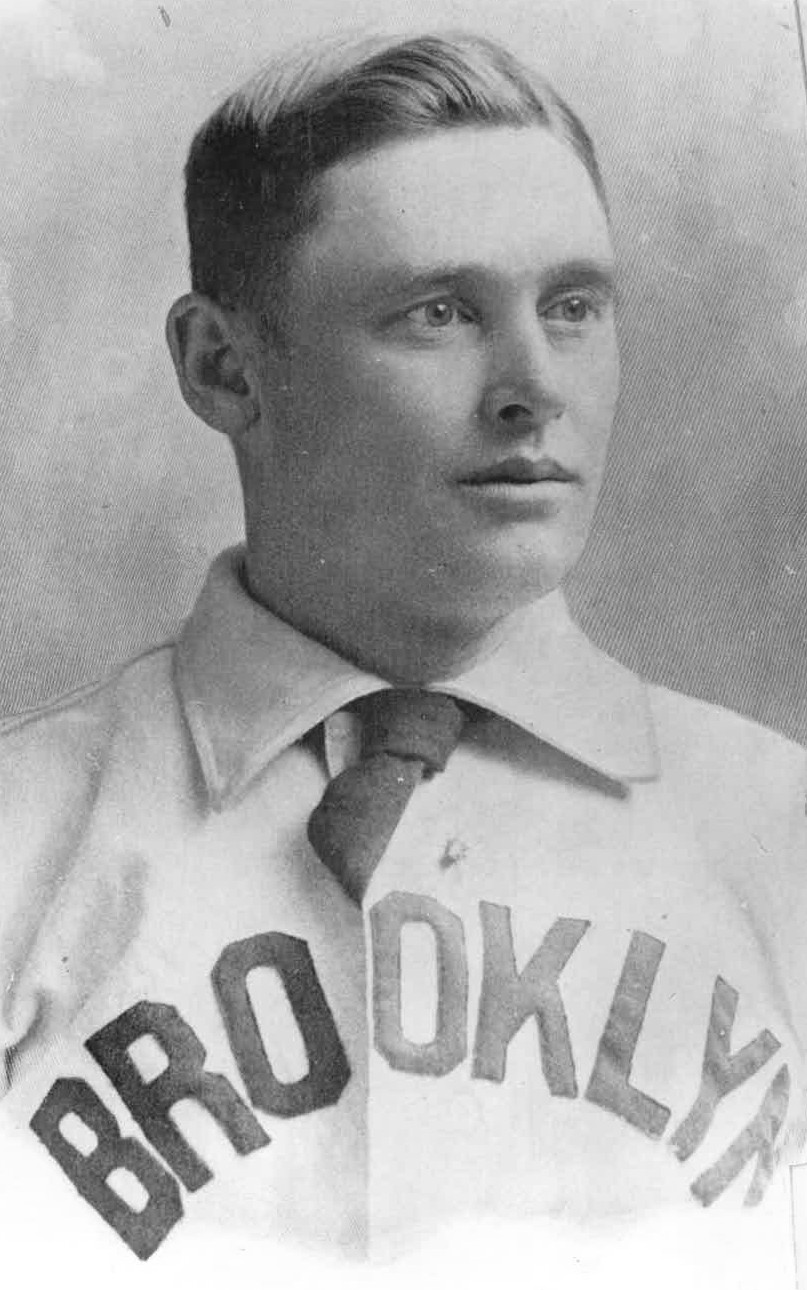
- Griffin in 1898
- Center fielder
- Born: March 20, 1865; Utica, New York, U.S.
- Died: April 10, 1908 (aged 43); Utica, New York, U.S.
- Batted: Left Threw: Right

MLB debut
- April 16, 1887, for the Baltimore Orioles

Last MLB appearance
- October 15, 1898, for the Brooklyn Bridegrooms

MLB statistics
- Batting average: .296
- Home runs: 42
- Runs batted in: 720
- Stolen bases: 473
- Stats at Baseball Reference

Teams
- As player: Baltimore Orioles (1887–1889); Philadelphia Athletics (1890); Brooklyn Bridegrooms (1891–1898); As manager: Brooklyn Bridegrooms (1898)

Michael Joseph Griffin (March 20, 1865 – April 10, 1908) was an American Major League Baseball center fielder who was born in Utica, New York. He played in 1,511 games over 12 seasons for teams in the American Association, Players' League, and National League. He had 1,755 hits, resulting in a .296 batting average, and was a prolific base stealer who swiped 473 bases during his career. In his last year in the majors, he was also a player-manager for the Brooklyn Bridegrooms. He scored 1,406 runs in his career; only Billy Hamilton recorded more runs than Griffin in the span of his career.

He recorded ten seasons with 100 runs scored in his career; in the Pre-Liveball Era, Griffin was one of only six players with ten 100-run seasons in league history.

== Career ==
While playing for the local Utica professional team, Griffin was scouted and signed by Billy Barnie of the Baltimore Orioles. On April 16, 1887, he became the first major league player to hit a home run in his first plate appearance, an honor he shares with George Tebeau, who homered on the exact same day in his first plate appearance (it is unclear which player hit his home run first, chronologically, so both are considered "the first"). Griffin went on to become one of the premiere ballplayers of the time, leading his league in runs scored in 1889 and doubles in 1891.

Griffin was team captain of Bridegrooms in 1897 and 1898 and served as interim manager for a part of 1898, a total of four games, winning one. After the 1898 season, Brooklyn signed him to a $3,500 contract to manage the following season. But before the season started, Brooklyn and Baltimore merged, and Baltimore manager Ned Hanlon was named Brooklyn's manager instead. Griffin was offered a $2,800 contract to play by Brooklyn, but he refused to sign. Brooklyn released him to the Cleveland Spiders, who then released him to the St. Louis Perfectos. After failing to receive a contract he felt he was worth from any team, he sued Brooklyn for the salary he believed they owed him from the contract he had signed and won a judgment of $2,300 from the club. He then unofficially retired from major league baseball.

Griffin returned to Utica where he became involved in the management of local breweries. It was there that he died from pneumonia, at age 43, and was buried at St. Agnes Cemetery.

== See also ==
- List of Major League Baseball career runs scored leaders
- List of Major League Baseball career triples leaders
- List of Major League Baseball career stolen bases leaders
- List of Major League Baseball annual runs scored leaders
- List of Major League Baseball annual doubles leaders
- List of Major League Baseball players with a home run in their first major league at bat
- List of Major League Baseball player-managers
