= Jeremy Hermida =

American baseball player (born 1984)

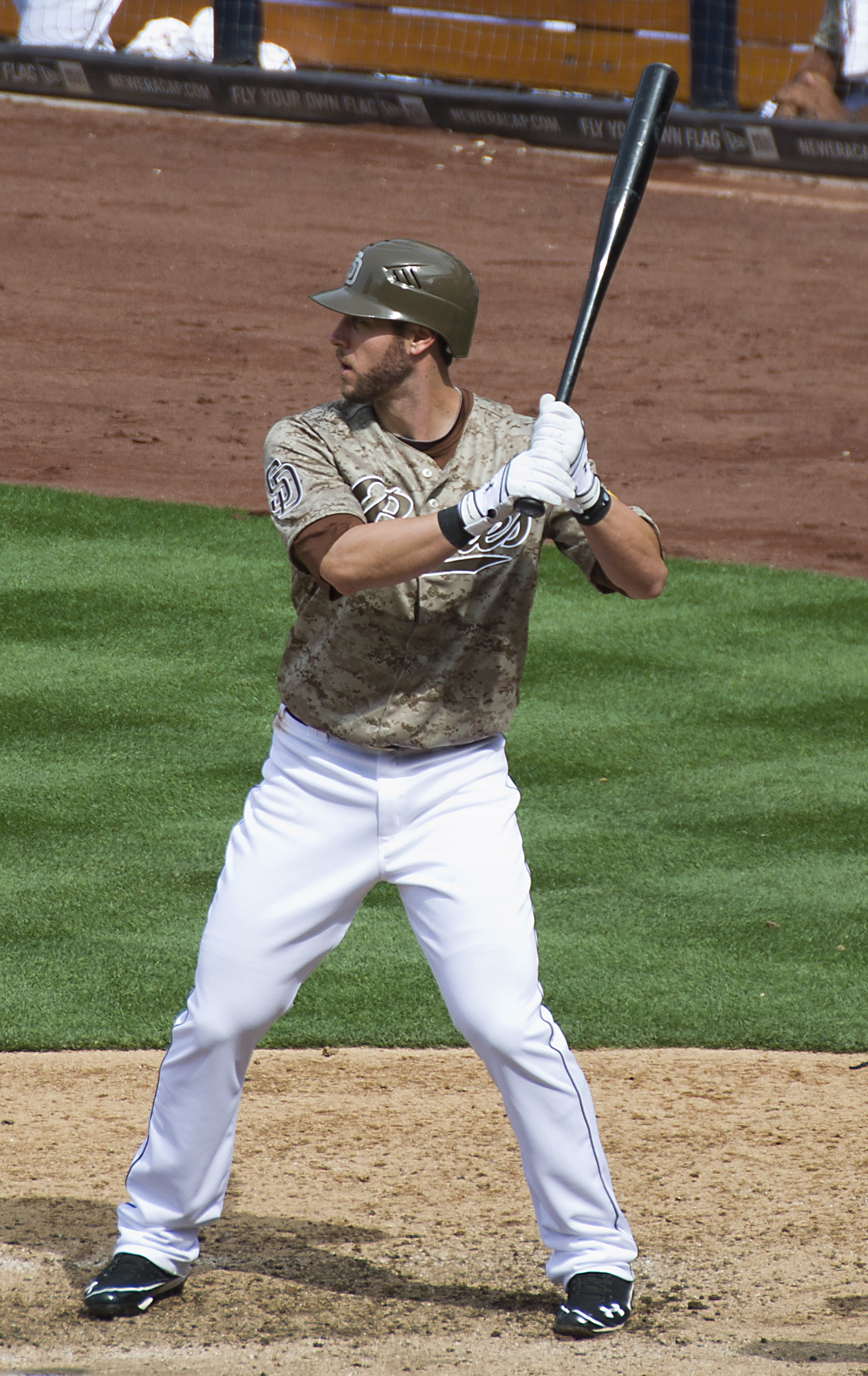
- Hermida with the San Diego Padres in 2012
- Right fielder
- Born: January 30, 1984 (age 42); Atlanta, Georgia, U.S.
- Batted: Left Threw: Right

Professional debut
- MLB: August 31, 2005, for the Florida Marlins
- NPB: March 27, 2015, for the Hokkaido Nippon Ham Fighters

Last appearance
- MLB: April 26, 2012, for the San Diego Padres
- NPB: October 5, 2015, for the Hokkaido Nippon Ham Fighters

MLB statistics
- Batting average: .257
- Home runs: 65
- Runs batted in: 250

NPB statistics
- Batting average: .211
- Home runs: 1
- Runs batted in: 18
- Stats at Baseball Reference

Teams
- Florida Marlins (2005–2009); Boston Red Sox (2010); Oakland Athletics (2010); Cincinnati Reds (2011); San Diego Padres (2011–2012); Hokkaido Nippon Ham Fighters (2015)

Jeremy Ryan Hermida (born January 30, 1984) is an American former professional baseball outfielder. He played in Major League Baseball (MLB) for the Florida Marlins, Boston Red Sox, Oakland Athletics, Cincinnati Reds, and San Diego Padres, and in Nippon Professional Baseball (NPB) for the Hokkaido Nippon Ham Fighters.

== Professional career ==
=== Florida Marlins ===
==== Minor leagues ====
After graduating from Wheeler High School in Marietta, Georgia, Hermida was the Marlins' No. 1 draft pick (11th overall) in the 2002 Major League Baseball draft, signed by Marlin scout, Joel Smith. He was one of the highest-rated minor league players that season, Hermida was a rising star in minor league baseball before being brought up. The Marlins were not looking for him to make a significant contribution the way Miguel Cabrera did when he was brought up from Double-A in June 2003, but Hermida has been compared to Braves' rookie Jeff Francoeur ever since the two were 14 years old growing up in the Atlanta area. Although the major difference between the two players is Hermida's eye for the strike zone, Hermida is one of the rare few in the minor leagues who was encouraged to swing more and walk less.

==== Major leagues ====
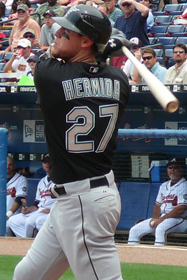
Hermida batting for the Florida Marlins in 2007.

Called up from the Double-A Carolina Mudcats, Hermida made his major league debut with the Florida Marlins on August 31, 2005. The Marlins promoted Hermida before September 1 so that he would be eligible to be on the Marlins' postseason roster, however the Marlins, who led the wild-card race on September 13, lost 12 of their next 14 games and were eliminated from postseason contention. In his debut, Hermida became the second of only four players in history to hit a grand slam in his first major league at-bat, after Bill Duggleby in 1898, and followed by Kevin Kouzmanoff in 2006 and Daniel Nava in 2010. Hermida is the only player to accomplish this feat as a pinch hitter, coming off St. Louis Cardinals pitcher Al Reyes.

In 2007, he led all Major League right fielders in errors, with 9, and had the lowest fielding percentage among them, .966.

=== Boston Red Sox ===
On November 5, 2009, Hermida was traded to the Boston Red Sox in exchange for left-handed minor league pitchers Hunter Jones and Jose Alvarez. Hermida played 52 games for the Red Sox in 2010, including 41 starts in left field, batting .203 in 158 at-bats.

On July 31, 2010, Hermida was designated for assignment. On August 31, Hermida was released.

=== Oakland Athletics ===
On September 3, 2010, Hermida signed a minor league contract with the Oakland Athletics and appeared in a few games at Triple-A Sacramento before being called to the parent club, where he played in 21 games through the end of the season. He declared for free agency on October 12.

=== Cincinnati Reds ===
Hermida signed a minor league contract with the Cincinnati Reds on January 4, 2011, with an invitation to spring training, where Hermida competed for a spot on the bench as a left-handed batter/backup outfielder. Hermida started the season with the Reds' Triple-A affiliate, the Louisville Bats. On April 18, he was added to the Reds 40-man roster and called up to the Reds after Juan Francisco was put on the disabled list. Hermida played in 10 games before being sent back down to Triple-A on May 4 when Fred Lewis came off the disabled list. Hermida spent the rest of the season in Louisville, where he was named an International League midseason All-Star.

=== San Diego Padres ===
On August 31, 2011, the San Diego Padres claimed Hermida off waivers from the Reds. He finished 2011 with seven walks and nine hits, including one home run, in 48 plate appearances for the Padres. On December 13, Hermida was non-tendered by San Diego, and became a free agent.

On December 21, 2011, Hermida re-signed with the Padres on a minor league contract. On April 3, 2012, the Padres selected Hermida's contract, adding him to their active roster. He appeared in 13 games for the Padres in April, picking up six hits in 24 at-bats. A strained abductor muscle sent him to the disabled list on April 27. After missing two months on the disabled list, he finished his season with the Triple-A Tucson Padres, posting a .252/.318/.358 line in 151 at-bats. On August 22, Hermida was designated for assignment to clear room on the 40-man roster. He was released on August 28, becoming a free agent.

=== Cleveland Indians ===
On February 4, 2013, the Cleveland Indians signed Hermida to a minor league contract. He made 132 appearances for the Triple-A Columbus Clippers, batting .247/.365/.416 with 17 home runs and 66 RBI.

=== Milwaukee Brewers ===
On January 25, 2014, the Milwaukee Brewers signed Hermida to a minor league contract. He made 108 appearances for the Triple-A Nashville Sounds, slashing .256/.370/.456 with 16 home runs and 67 RBI. Hermida was released by the Brewers organization on December 11, in order to pursue an opportunity in Japan.

=== Hokkaido Nippon-Ham Fighters ===
On December 12, 2014, Hermida signed with the Hokkaido Nippon-Ham Fighters of Nippon Professional Baseball. He played in 50 games for the Fighters in 2015, batting .211/.318/.289 with one home run, 18 RBI, and one stolen base. Hermida became a free agent after the season.

== See also ==
- List of players with a home run in first major league at-bat
