= Bill Lefebvre =

American baseball player (1915–2007)

- Pitcher
- Born: November 11, 1915; West Warwick, Rhode Island, U.S.
- Died: January 19, 2007 (aged 91); Largo, Florida, U.S.
- Batted: Left Threw: Left

MLB debut
- June 10, 1938, for the Boston Red Sox

Last MLB appearance
- September 29, 1944, for the Washington Senators

MLB statistics
- Win–loss record: 5–5
- Earned run average: 5.03
- Strikeouts: 36
- Stats at Baseball Reference

Teams
- Boston Red Sox (1938–1939); Washington Senators (1943–1944)

Wilfred Henry "Lefty" Lefebvre (November 11, 1915 – January 19, 2007) was an American professional baseball player and scout, and college baseball head coach. A southpaw pitcher and native of West Warwick, Rhode Island, LeFebvre had a nine-year playing career (1938–1944; 1946–1947). He appeared in 36 games in Major League Baseball as a member of the Boston Red Sox (six games in 1938–1939) and Washington Senators (30 games during 1943–1944). LeFebvre entered baseball after graduating from the College of the Holy Cross. He was listed as 5 feet 11 inches (1.80 m) tall and 180 pounds (82 kg).

In 1935, LeFebvre played for Falmouth in the Cape Cod Baseball League (CCBL) and helped lead the team to the league title.

In MLB, LeFebvre posted a 5–5 record and a 5.03 earned run average. In 1321/3 innings pitched, he surrendered 162 hits and 51 bases on balls, fanning 36. He made ten starts among his 36 appearances, with three complete games. He notched three saves as a relief pitcher.

In his major league debut on June 10, 1938, in his very first at-bat, Lefebvre hit his only MLB home run over Fenway's Green Monster. The opposite-field blow, a solo shot, came off Monty Stratton of the Chicago White Sox in the midst of a mop-up assignment, as Chicago thrashed the Red Sox, 15–2.

From 1949 to 1963, Lefebvre was the head baseball coach at Brown University. He also served as a longtime scout for the Senators and Red Sox. In the early 1960s he returned to the CCBL to manage the Dennis Clippers and Chatham Red Sox.

== See also ==
- List of Major League Baseball players with a home run in their first major league at bat
