= Kevin Kouzmanoff =

American baseball player (born 1981)

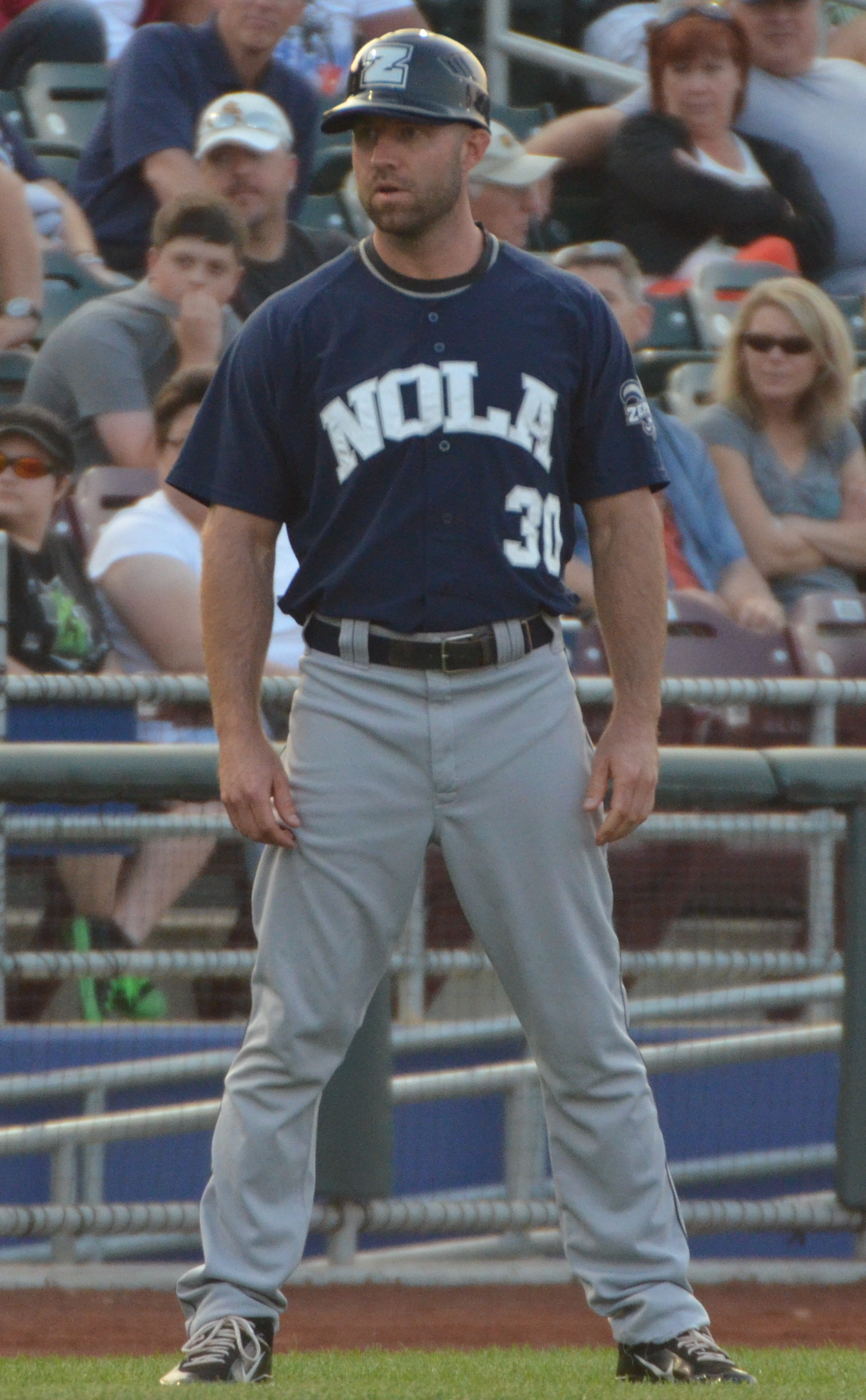
- Kouzmanoff with the New Orleans Zephyrs in 2013
- Third baseman
- Born: July 25, 1981 (age 45); Newport Beach, California, U.S.
- Batted: Right Threw: Right

MLB debut
- September 2, 2006, for the Cleveland Indians

Last MLB appearance
- April 22, 2014, for the Texas Rangers

MLB statistics
- Batting average: .257
- Home runs: 87
- Runs batted in: 371
- Stats at Baseball Reference

Teams
- Cleveland Indians (2006); San Diego Padres (2007–2009); Oakland Athletics (2010–2011); Colorado Rockies (2011); Texas Rangers (2014)

Kevin Kouzmanoff (born July 25, 1981) is an American former professional baseball third baseman. He played in Major League Baseball (MLB) for the Cleveland Indians, San Diego Padres, Oakland Athletics, Colorado Rockies, and Texas Rangers.

Kouzmanoff is the third of only four players in history to hit a grand slam in his first major league at-bat, after Bill Duggleby in 1898 and Jeremy Hermida in 2005, and followed by Daniel Nava in 2010. Both Kouzmanoff and Nava accomplished this feat on the first pitch they saw.

Kouzmanoff is of Macedonian descent.

== Amateur career ==
Kouzmanoff grew up in Newport Beach, California. He also spent part of his childhood in Bonita, California, where he attended Sunnyside Elementary School and began playing baseball in the Sweetwater Valley Little League. Kouzmanoff then moved to Evergreen, Colorado, where he played high school baseball at Evergreen High School.

Kouzmanoff enrolled at Cochise College for two years. In 2002, he attended the University of Arkansas at Little Rock. He transferred to the University of Nevada, Reno.

== Professional career ==
=== Cleveland Indians ===
The Cleveland Indians selected Kouzmanoff in the sixth round of the 2003 Major League Baseball draft. Kouzmanoff made his professional debut later in 2003 with the Mahoning Valley Scrappers, hitting .272 with eight home runs and 33 RBI in 206 at-bats. Kouzmanoff also played for the Winchester Royals in Virginia.

In 2004, Kouzmanoff hit 16 home runs, 87 RBI and a .330 average with the Lake County Captains of the South Atlantic League. Bothered by back problems in 2005, he was limited to only 254 at-bats with the Kinston Indians, but still hit .339 with 12 home runs and 58 RBI.

Starting the 2006 season with Double-A Akron, Kouzmanoff flirted with a .400 average before finishing at .389 and being promoted to the Buffalo Bisons in July. He was named the Indians' 2006 Minor League Player of the Year (receiving the "Lou Boudreau Award").

On September 2, 2006, Kouzmanoff hit a grand slam off then-Texas Rangers starter Edinson Vólquez on the very first pitch he ever saw in the major leagues, the first player in MLB history ever to do so on the first pitch. With this home run, Kouzmanoff became the 23rd major leaguer to hit a home run on his first Major League pitch, the 12th American Leaguer to do so, and the second of 2006 (along with Adam Wainwright of the St. Louis Cardinals). The first-pitch grand slam feat was equalled by Boston Red Sox outfielder Daniel Nava on June 12, 2010.

On November 8, 2006, Kouzmanoff was traded with pitcher Andrew Brown to San Diego in exchange for second baseman Josh Barfield.

=== San Diego Padres ===
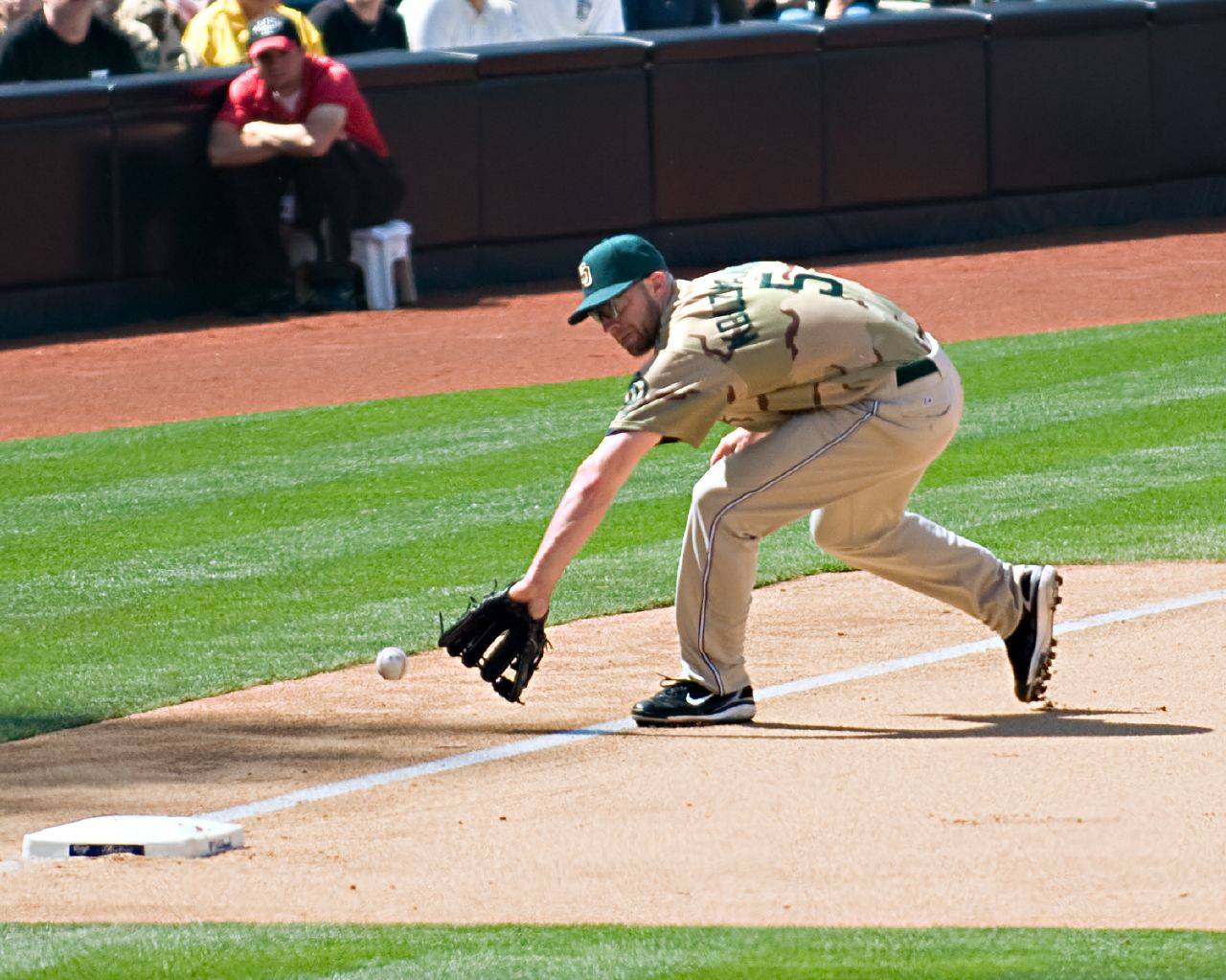
Kouzmanoff with the San Diego Padres in 2008

Padres fans were slow to embrace Kouzmanoff at the beginning of the season; Barfield had been popular with fans, and Kouzmanoff endured a slow start. However, he gradually increased his production and fans affectionately began to root "Koooz" when he made plays or got base hits, leading some uninitiated spectators to believe he was being booed.

In 2007, Kouzmanoff was ninth among all NL rookies in RBI (74; behind Troy Tulowitzki and Ryan Braun), seventh in home runs (18; behind Braun, Chris Young, Tulowitzki, and Josh Hamilton), hits (133), and extra base hits (50), and tied for 10th in runs (57).

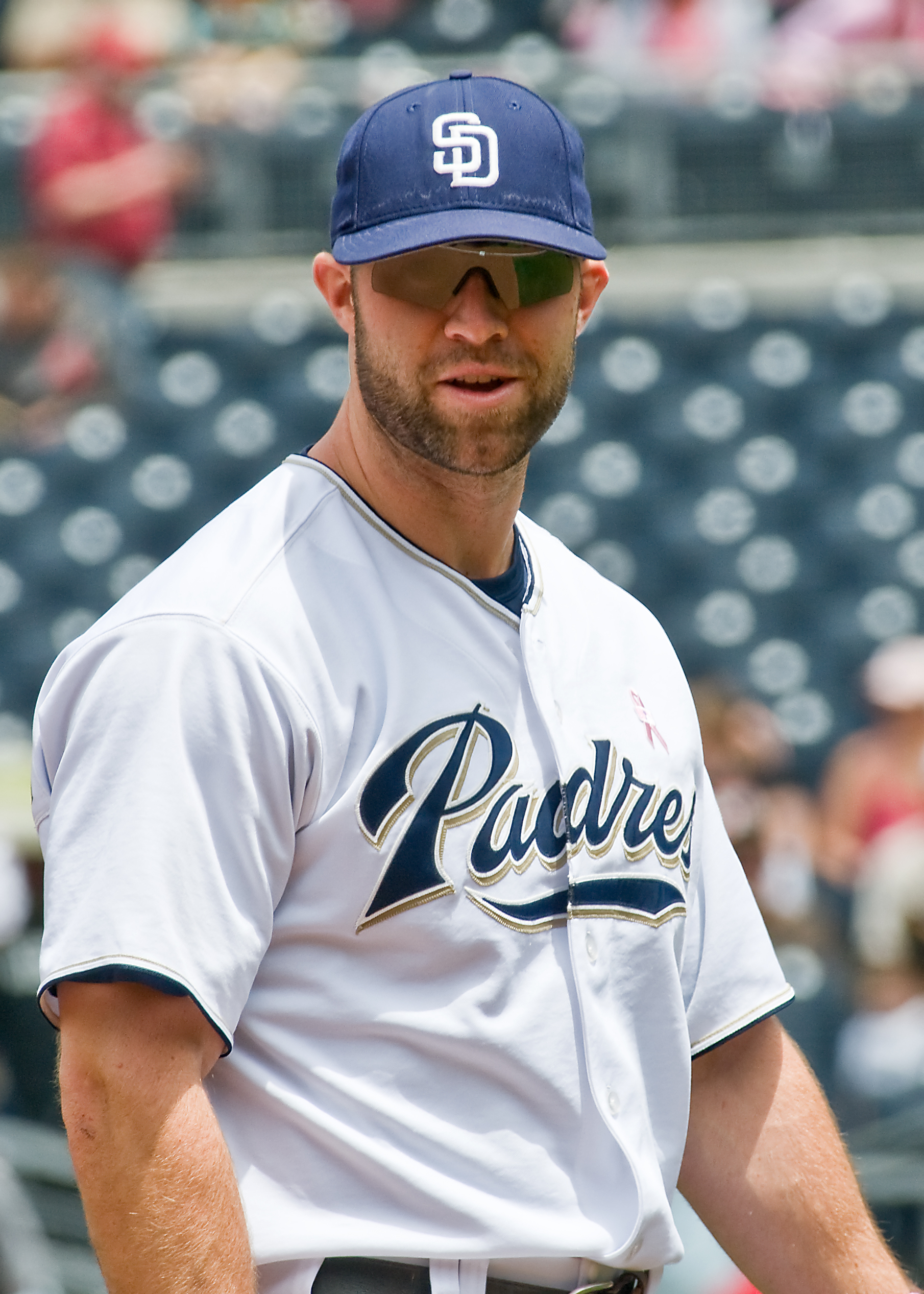
Kouzmanoff with the San Diego Padres in 2008

In 2008, he had the worst strikeout-to-walk ratio in the majors, 6.04.

In 2009, he set a National League single-season record for third basemen with a .990 fielding percentage, committing three errors in 309 total chances. This led to the Hall of Fame calling him and asking if he would donate his glove to them on which he responded; "I have to pick the glove. They aren't getting my gamer!"

Kouzmanoff broke the record of .987 by Colorado's Vinny Castilla in 2004.

=== Oakland Athletics ===
On January 16, 2010, Kouzmanoff and minor league infielder Eric Sogard were traded to the Oakland Athletics for outfielders Scott Hairston and Aaron Cunningham.

=== Colorado Rockies ===
On August 23, 2011, the Colorado Rockies acquired Kouzmanoff for a player to be named later or cash considerations. Following the season, he was outrighted from the 40-man roster and on October 6, he elected free agency.

=== Kansas City Royals ===
On January 14, 2012, Kouzmanoff signed a minor league deal that included an invitation to Spring training with the Kansas City Royals. If he made it to the majors, he would have earned $1 million, with up to $300,000 in incentives related to plate appearances.

Kouzmanoff did not make it to the major leagues in 2012, instead splitting his time with Triple-A Omaha and Double-A Northwest Arkansas, where he hit .276/.309/.382 with 2 HR and 46 RBI in 90 games combined.

=== Miami Marlins ===
On November 3, 2012, Kouzmanoff signed a minor league deal with the Miami Marlins with an invitation to spring training. He was granted free agency on November 5, 2013.

=== Texas Rangers ===
Kouzmanoff signed a minor league deal with the Texas Rangers on December 12, 2013. He was called up to the Major Leagues on April 9, 2014, to replace the injured Adrián Beltré. He hit safely in his first 10 games with the Rangers. He was named American League Player of the Week in his first week with his new team, batting .345 with eight RBI, six runs scored, and four doubles. He also had a .690 slugging percentage, which was tied for third in the league. He ultimately appeared in 13 games for the Rangers, hitting .362 on the season, with two home runs and 10 RBI. On October 6, Kouzmanoff was removed from the 40–man roster and sent outright to the Triple-A Round Rock Express. He elected free agency the following day.

== Coaching career ==
Kouzmanoff was named hitting coach of the Stockton Ports, the Single-A affiliate of the Oakland Athletics, for the 2023 season. Kouzmanoff was named hitting coach of the Lansing Lugnuts for the 2024 season. On February 5, 2025, the Athletics announced Kouzmanoff as the assistant hitting coach for their Triple-A affiliate, the Las Vegas Aviators.

== See also ==
- Home run in first Major League at-bat
