= Bill Duggleby =

American baseball player (1874–1944)

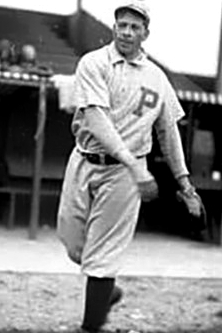
- Pitcher
- Born: March 16, 1874; Utica, New York, U.S.
- Died: August 30, 1944 (aged 70); Redfield, New York, U.S.
- Batted: Unknown Threw: Right

MLB debut
- April 21, 1898, for the Philadelphia Phillies

Last MLB appearance
- September 7, 1907, for the Pittsburgh Pirates

MLB statistics
- Win–loss record: 93–102
- Earned run average: 3.18
- Strikeouts: 453
- Stats at Baseball Reference

Teams
- Philadelphia Phillies (1898, 1901); Philadelphia Athletics (1902); Philadelphia Phillies (1902–1907); Pittsburgh Pirates (1907)

William James Duggleby (March 16, 1874 – August 30, 1944), nicknamed "Frosty Bill", was an American pitcher for the Philadelphia Phillies. He played from 1898 to 1907. He also played two games for the Philadelphia Athletics in 1902 and nine games for the Pittsburgh Pirates in 1907.

Duggleby and Ed Murphy pitched for the Auburn Maroons in the New York State League in 1897 and were sold to the Phillies that December.

Duggleby is the first of four major league players to hit a grand slam in his first major league at-bat, followed by Jeremy Hermida, Kevin Kouzmanoff, and Daniel Nava. He was the only pitcher to hit a grand slam for their first major league hit until July 8, 2021, when Daniel Camarena became the second. As of 2011, he still holds the Phillies team record for hit batsmen for a career (82).

Duggleby was one of the "jumpers" who left the Phillies in 1902 for other teams, including (in Duggleby's case) Connie Mack's new American League team, the Athletics. The Phillies filed suit to prevent the "jumpers" — in particular, Nap Lajoie, Bill Bernhard, and Chick Fraser — from playing for any other team, a plea which was rejected by a lower court before being upheld by the Pennsylvania Supreme Court. Duggleby was the first of the "jumpers" to return to the Phillies, on May 8, 1902, after playing only two games with the A's.

He was the manager of the Minor League Baseball team, the Albany Babies, in 1912.

Duggleby, a native of Utica, New York, died in Redfield, New York in 1944.

== See also ==
- List of players with a home run in first major league at-bat
- History of the Philadelphia Athletics for more on the "jumpers"
- List of Major League Baseball career hit batsmen leaders
