= Walter Mueller =

American baseball player (1894–1971)

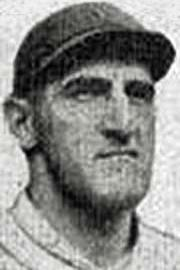
- Outfielder
- Born: December 6, 1894; Central, Missouri, U.S.
- Died: August 16, 1971 (aged 76); St. Louis, Missouri, U.S.
- Batted: Right Threw: Right

MLB debut
- May 7, 1922, for the Pittsburgh Pirates

Last MLB appearance
- September 25, 1926, for the Pittsburgh Pirates

MLB statistics
- Batting average: .275
- Hits: 95
- Home runs: 2
- Stats at Baseball Reference

Teams
- Pittsburgh Pirates (1922–1926)

Walter John Mueller (December 6, 1894 – August 16, 1971) was an American professional baseball player who played outfield in the Major Leagues for the Pittsburgh Pirates, from 1922 to 1926. He is best known for becoming the first player to hit a home run off the first pitch ever thrown to him in the major leagues.

Walter was the father to Don Mueller, who also played in the major leagues, during the 1940s and 1950s, as well as the brother of fellow major leaguer, Heinie Mueller.

== Professional career ==
He began the 1922 season with the Pirates, but he sat on the bench for three weeks before the team's manager, George Gibson, gave him a chance to play. In the early 1920s, Pittsburgh did not play baseball within the state borders on Sundays, due to Pennsylvania's blue laws. Therefore, the Pirates interrupted a home stand to travel to Cubs Park for a one-day trip on Sunday, May 7, 1922 to play the Chicago Cubs. During that game, Mueller became the first major leaguer ever to hit a home run off the first pitch thrown to him in the major leagues. The pitch that resulted in the historic home run, was thrown by future Hall of Famer, Grover Cleveland Alexander. Later in the game, Mueller added another RBI for the Pirates, as the team defeated the Cubs, 11-5. While Mueller is recognized today for this accomplishment, he was not at the time of the event. The game's boxscore credited the home run to Claude Rohwer, who was on the Pirates roster to start the 1922 season, but was sent to the minor leagues several days later. Rohwer would never play a game in the majors. Yet, the name of "C. Rohwer" appeared in the boxscore for the May 7th game, even though Walter Mueller was in right field for the Pirates that day. The mixup with Rohwer was enough to keep Mueller's name out of the record books for several years.

Mueller would only hit one more home run in his major league career. He recorded a batting average of .306 in 40 games the following season for the Pirates. He played 49 more games in the 1924 and 1926 seasons before playing his last game in 1926. He remained the only Pirate to homer on the first pitch of his first major league start until Starling Marté accomplished the feat on July 26, 2012.

== See also ==
- Home run in first Major League at-bat
