= Joshua Báez =

Dominican–American baseball player (born 2003)

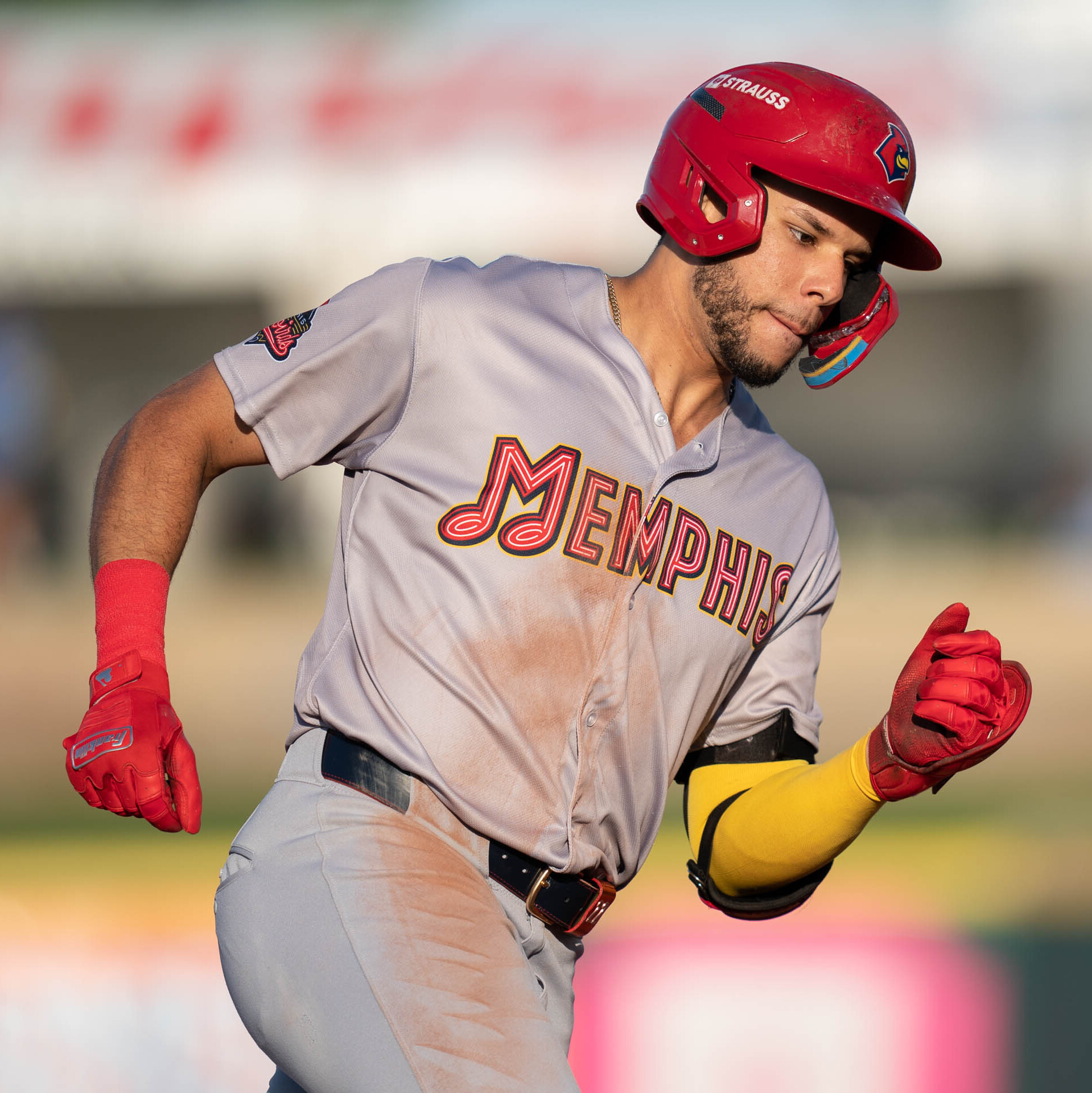
- Báez with the Memphis Redbirds in 2026

St. Louis Cardinals – No. 22
- Outfielder
- Born: June 28, 2003 (age 23); Boston, Massachusetts, U.S.
- Bats: Right Throws: Right

MLB debut
- August 15, 2026, for the St. Louis Cardinals

MLB statistics (through 2026 season)
- Batting average: .230
- Home runs: 7
- Runs batted in: 18
- Stats at Baseball Reference

Teams
- St. Louis Cardinals (2026–present)

Career highlights and awards
- MLB records for most home runs in a debut (3) and consecutive home runs to begin a career (3)

Joshua Emanuel Báez (born June 28, 2003) is a Dominican–American professional baseball outfielder for the St. Louis Cardinals of Major League Baseball (MLB). In his MLB debut on August 15, 2026, he hit home runs in his first three MLB plate appearances, becoming the first player to do so.

== Early life and amateur career ==
Báez was born in Boston, Massachusetts, and moved to Santo Domingo as an infant. He and his family moved back to Boston and into the neighborhood of Dorchester when he was in sixth grade. He knew no English and used Google Translate to communicate. He began his high school career at Cristo Rey Boston High School and transferred to Snowden International School as a sophomore where he threw up to 97 miles per hour as a pitcher while also batting .442 with twenty runs batted in (RBI) and 11 stolen bases.

Prior to his junior year, Báez transferred to Dexter Southfield School. He was named the Massachusetts Gatorade Baseball Player of the Year as a junior in 2020, despite there being no season due to the COVID-19 pandemic, due to his work ethic and potential. In a shortened 2021 season in which he appeared in 16 games, he hit .378 with three home runs alongside pitching to a 1.94 ERA and 44 strikeouts over 18 innings. He committed to play college baseball at Vanderbilt University.

== Professional career ==
The St. Louis Cardinals selected Báez in the second round, with the 54th overall selection, of the 2021 Major League Baseball draft. He signed with the Cardinals for $2.25 million. He made his professional debut in early August with the Rookie-level Florida Complex League Cardinals. Over 95 plate appearances, Báez hit .158 with two home runs, eight RBI, three doubles, 28 strikeouts, and 14 walks.

Báez began the 2022 season in extended spring training. In mid-May, he was assigned to the Palm Beach Cardinals of the Single-A Florida State League. After one game, Báez was placed on the injured list with a left wrist sprain. He rehabbed in the Florida Complex League and then returned to play with Palm Beach in mid-August. Over 32 games between the two teams, Báez batted .267 with four home runs, 21 RBI, and ten stolen bases. Báez returned to Palm Beach for the 2023 season. Over 91 games, he hit .218 with seven home runs, 36 RBI, and thirty stolen bases. In 2024, Báez opened the season with the Peoria Chiefs of the High-A Midwest League and also played with Palm Beach, batting .245 with 11 home runs and 41 RBI over 86 games between both teams. He spent time on the development list during the season.

Báez opened the 2025 season with Peoria and was promoted to the Springfield Cardinals of the Double-A Texas League in late May. Over 117 games between the two affiliates, he hit .287 with 20 home runs, 79 RBI, and 54 stolen bases. On November 18, 2025, the Cardinals added Báez to their 40-man roster to protect him from the Rule 5 draft.

Báez hit .333 with three home runs during 2026 spring training with the Cardinals, and was optioned to the Memphis Redbirds of the Triple-A International League to open the 2026 season. He hit four home runs in the Redbirds' game on June 16, which marked a Memphis single-game record.

On August 14, 2026, Cardinals manager Oli Marmol announced that Báez would be promoted to the major leagues for the first time. At the time of his call-up, he had played in 103 games for Memphis and had a .256 batting average, 34 home runs, and 90 RBI.

Báez made his MLB debut on August 15, 2026, as the Cardinals' starting left fielder against the Chicago Cubs at Wrigley Field. He hit a home run on the first pitch of his first MLB plate appearance off Cubs starting pitcher Matthew Boyd. He hit additional home runs, also off Boyd, in his second and third plate appearances. He made MLB history by being the first person to hit three home runs in his Major League debut game, let alone consecutively and in his first three Major League at bats, surpassing Bob Nieman's record of hitting home runs in both of his first two Major League at-bats within the same game. In Báez's case, he was the first to do so in his first three plate appearances. Báez finished the game 3-for-4 with three home runs and five RBI in an 8–4 Cardinals victory. On September 18, he was placed on the injured list with a left oblique strain, ending his season. Across 100 at-bats over 29 games, Báez finished the 2026 season with a .230 batting average, seven home runs, 18 RBI, and seven doubles.

== See also ==
- List of Major League Baseball players with a home run in their first major league at bat
