= Heinie Mueller (outfielder) =

American baseball player (1899–1975)

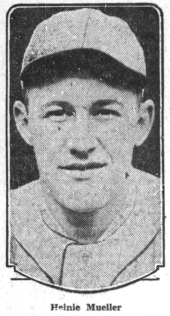
- Outfielder
- Born: September 16, 1899; Creve Coeur, Missouri, U.S.
- Died: January 23, 1975 (aged 75); DeSoto, Missouri, U.S.
- Batted: Switch Threw: Right

MLB debut
- September 25, 1920, for the St. Louis Cardinals

Last MLB appearance
- June 15, 1935, for the St. Louis Browns

MLB statistics
- Batting average: .282
- Home runs: 22
- Runs batted in: 272
- Stats at Baseball Reference

Teams
- St. Louis Cardinals (1920–1926); New York Giants (1926–1927); Boston Braves (1928–1929); St. Louis Browns (1935)

Clarence Francis "Heinie" Mueller (September 16, 1899 – January 23, 1975) was an American professional baseball outfielder. He played professional baseball for 18 years from 1920 to 1938, including 11 years in Major League Baseball with the St. Louis Cardinals (1920–26), New York Giants (1926–27), Boston Braves (1928–29), and St. Louis Browns (1935). He also played six years in the minor leagues with the Buffalo Bisons from 1929 to 1934.

Mueller was born in 1899 at Creve Coeur, Missouri. Mueller made his major-league debut on September 25, 1920, and played his final major-league game on June 15, 1935. In 11 major-league seasons, he appeared in 693 games (367 as a center fielder) and had a batting average of .282 (597-for-2118) with 22 home runs and 272 RBI.

He was known as "the last of the baseball clowns." A sports writer in 1929 wrote that Mueller's "Great weakness is trying to think." While he was with the St. Louis Cardinals in the 1920s, there was a rumor that he built a boat in his cellar and had to demolish a wall to get it outside. When team owner Branch Rickey asked if the boat story was true, Mueller replied, "Naw, Mr. Rickey, it wasn't a boat, it was a chicken coop."

Mueller died of cancer in DeSoto, Missouri, at age 75.

Heinie was the brother of fellow MLB player Walter Mueller.
