= List of Florida Complex League stadiums =

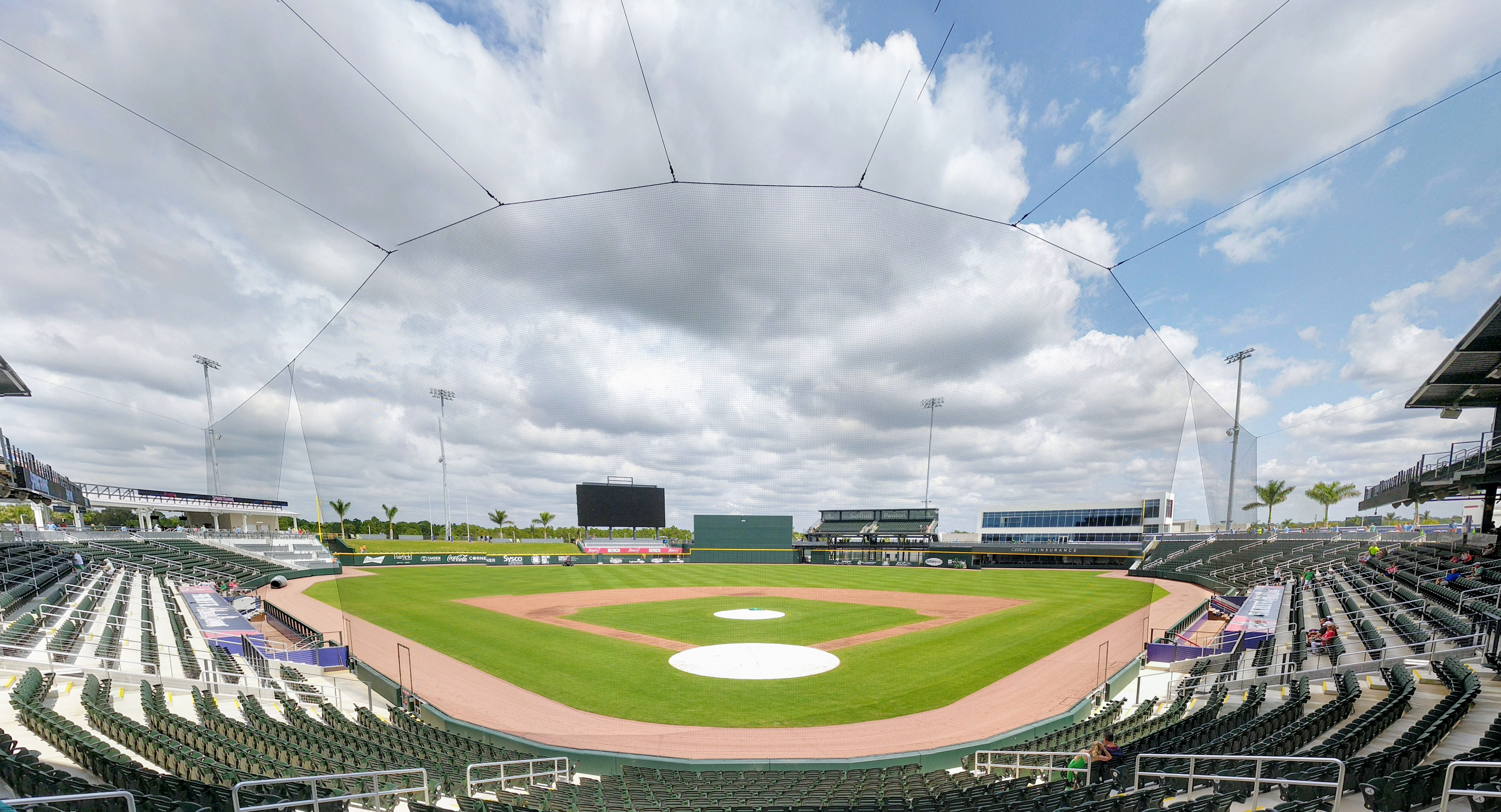
CoolToday Park is the newest stadium in the league and home of the Braves.

There are 13 stadiums in use by Florida Complex League baseball teams, all located in Florida. The oldest is Joker Marchant Stadium (1966) in Lakeland, home of the Tigers. The newest stadium is CoolToday Park (2019) in North Port, the home field of the Braves. Three stadiums were built in the 1960s, one in the 1970s, and three in each of the 1980s, 1990s, and 2010s. The highest seating capacity is 11,000 at the Yankees' George M. Steinbrenner Field; the lowest capacity is 500 at the Carpenter Complex, where the Phillies play. All stadiums have a grass surface.

== Stadiums and Map ==
Florida Complex League stadium locations
- North Division
- South Division
- East Division

Name	Team(s)	Location	Opened	Capacity	Ref(s)
Bobby Mattick Training Center at Englebert Complex	FCL Blue Jays	Dunedin	1978	5,500	
CACTI Park of the Palm Beaches	FCL Astros; FCL Nationals	West Palm Beach	2017	6,500	
Charlotte Sports Park	FCL Rays	Port Charlotte	1988	7,000	
Clover Park	FCL Mets	Port St. Lucie	1988	7,160	
CoolToday Park	FCL Braves	North Port	2019	9,500	
Ed Smith Stadium	FCL Orioles	Sarasota	1989	8,340	
George M. Steinbrenner Field	FCL Yankees	Tampa	1996	11,000	
Hammond Stadium	FCL Twins	Fort Myers	1991	7,500	
JetBlue Park at Fenway South	FCL Red Sox	Fort Myers	2012	8,000	
Paul Owens Training Facility at Carpenter Complex	FCL Phillies	Clearwater	1967	500	
Pirate City	FCL Pirates	Bradenton	1969	7,500	
Publix Field at Joker Marchant Stadium	FCL Tigers	Lakeland	1966	8,500	
Roger Dean Chevrolet Stadium	FCL Cardinals; FCL Marlins	Jupiter	1998	7,200	

== Gallery ==
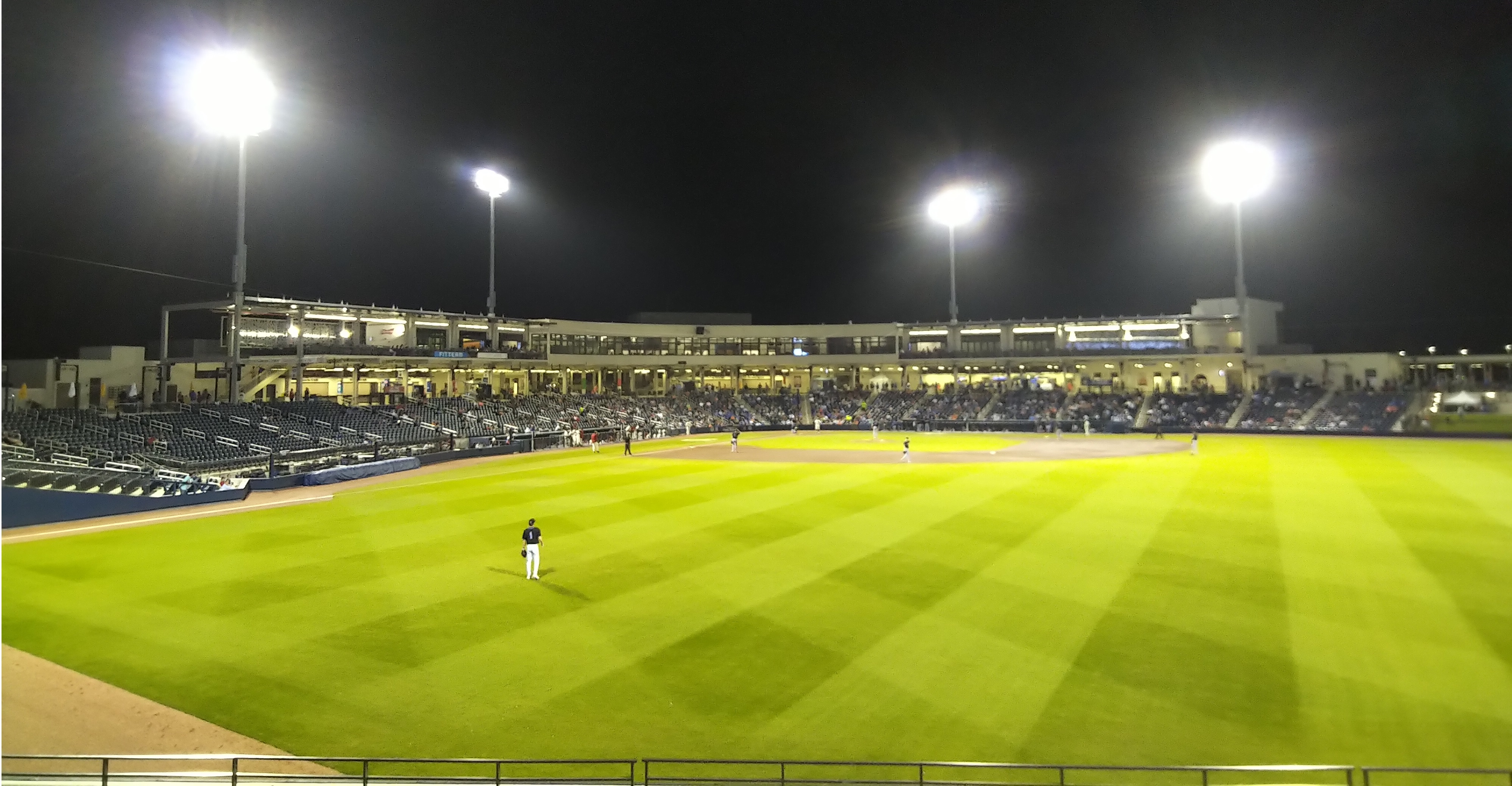
CACTI Park (Astros, Nationals)

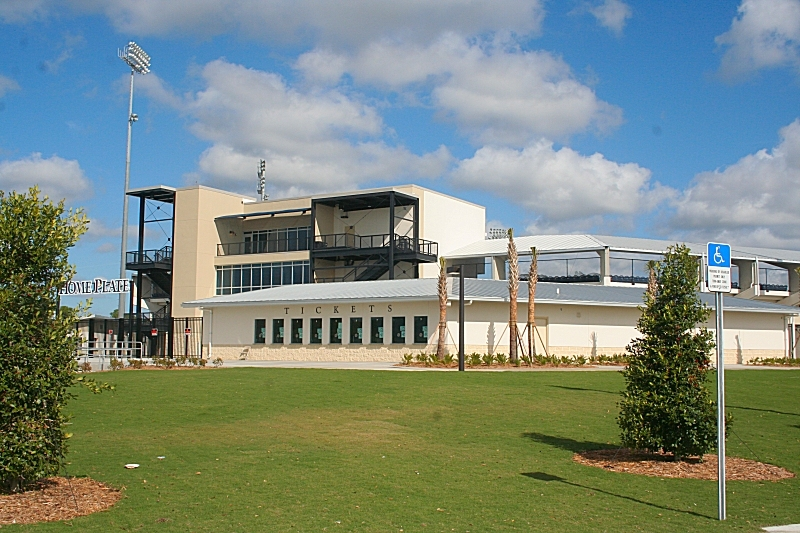
Charlotte Sports Park (Rays)

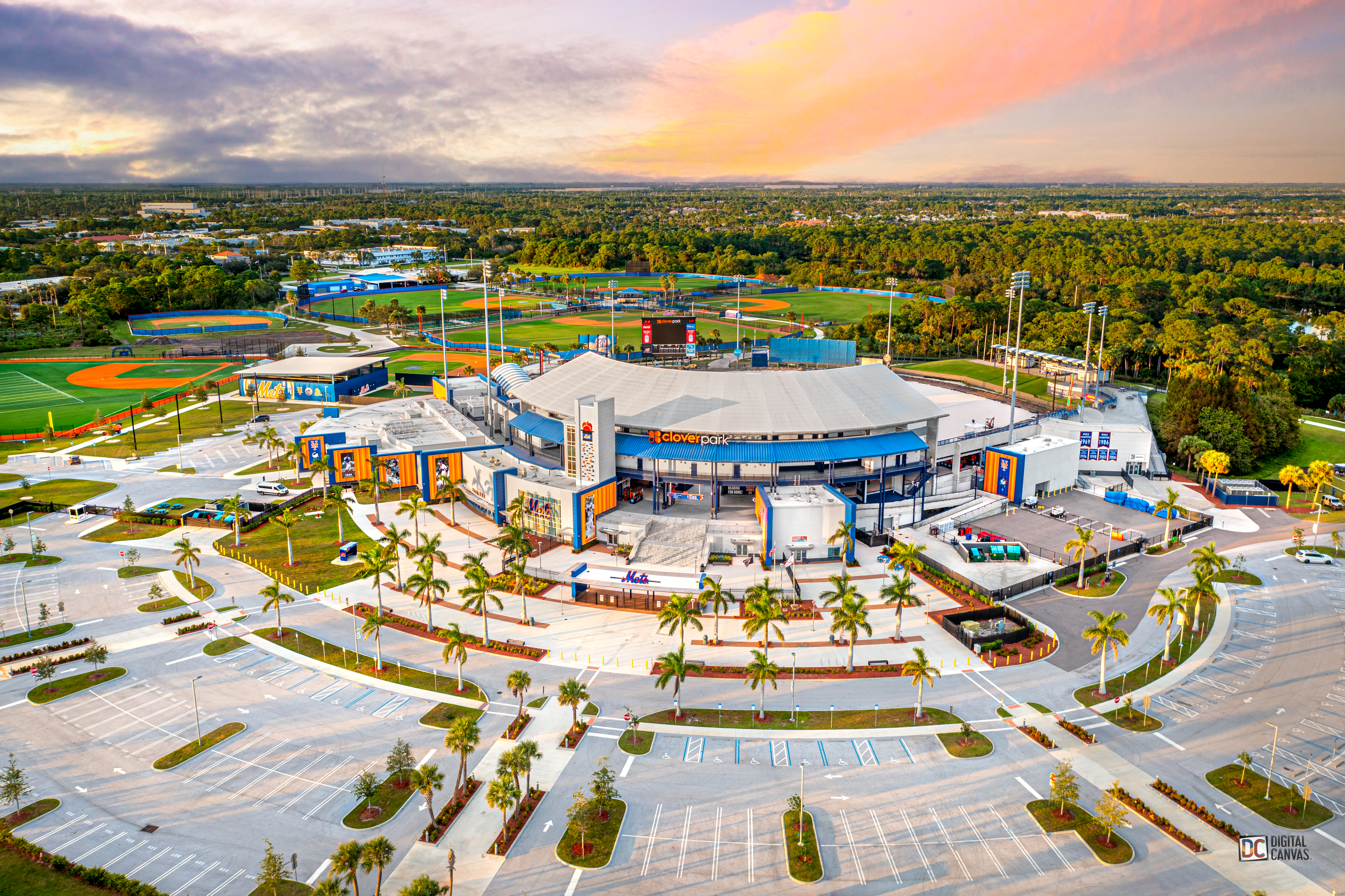
Clover Park (Mets)

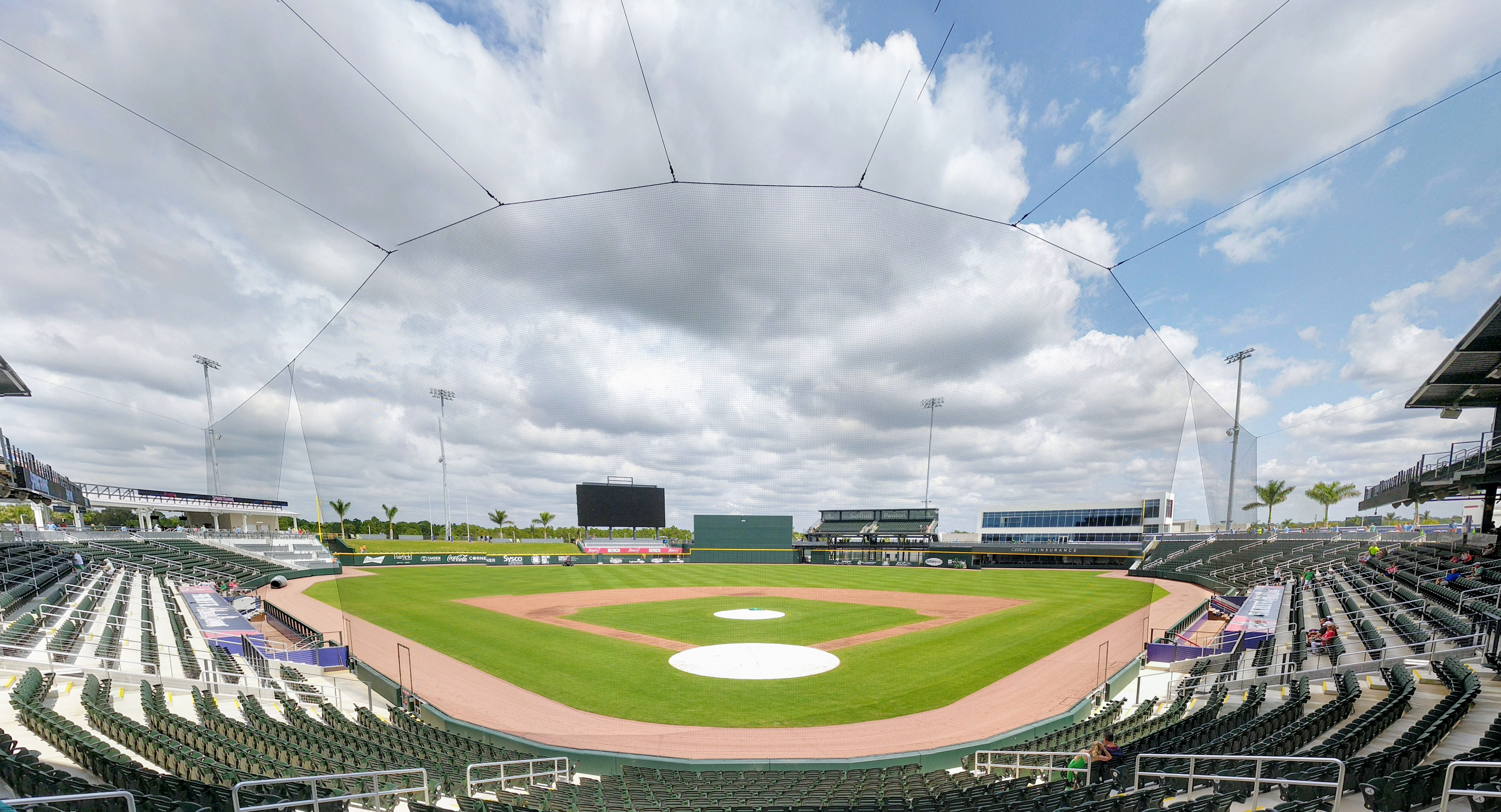
CoolToday Park (Braves)

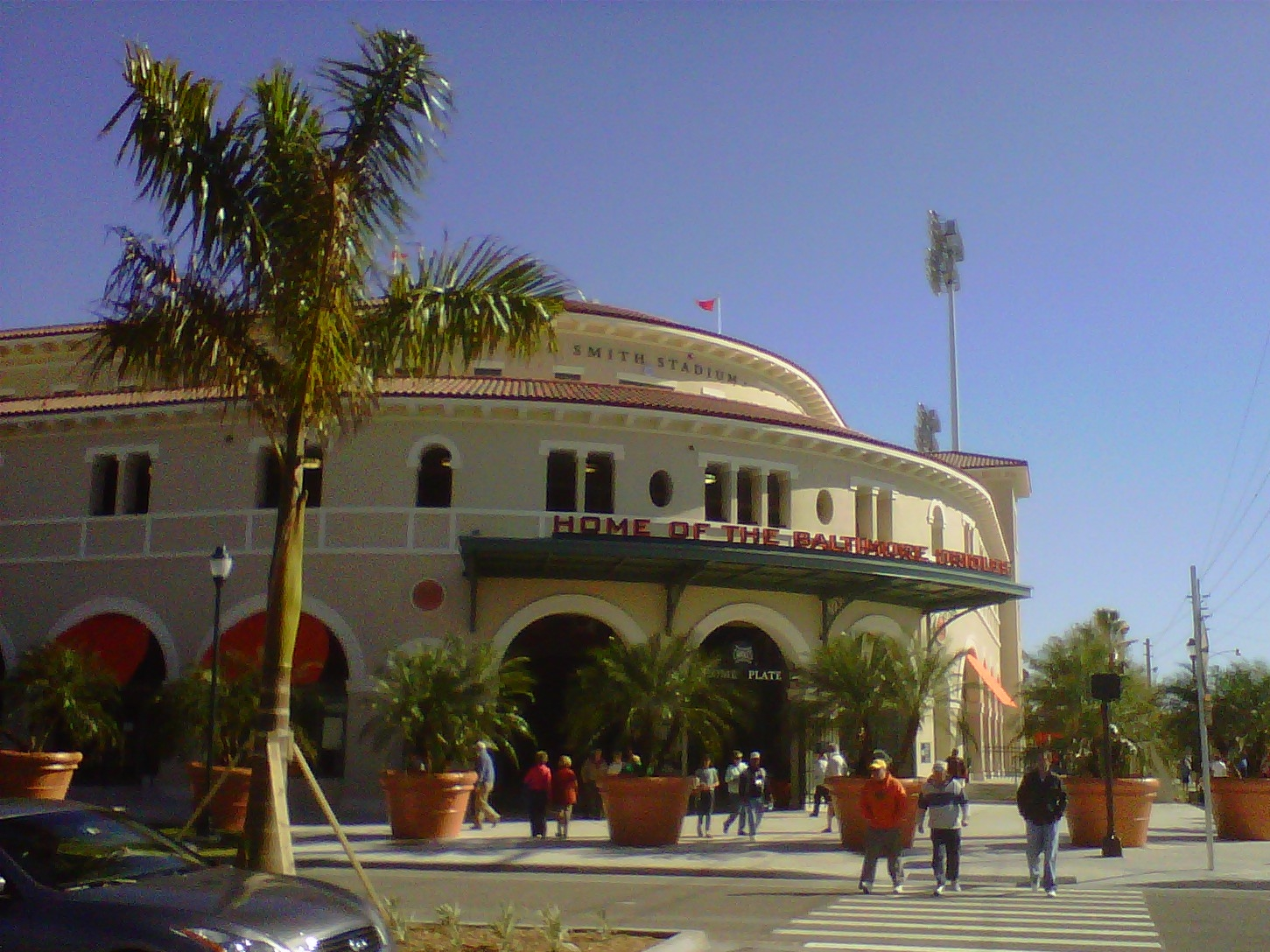
Ed Smith Stadium (Orioles)

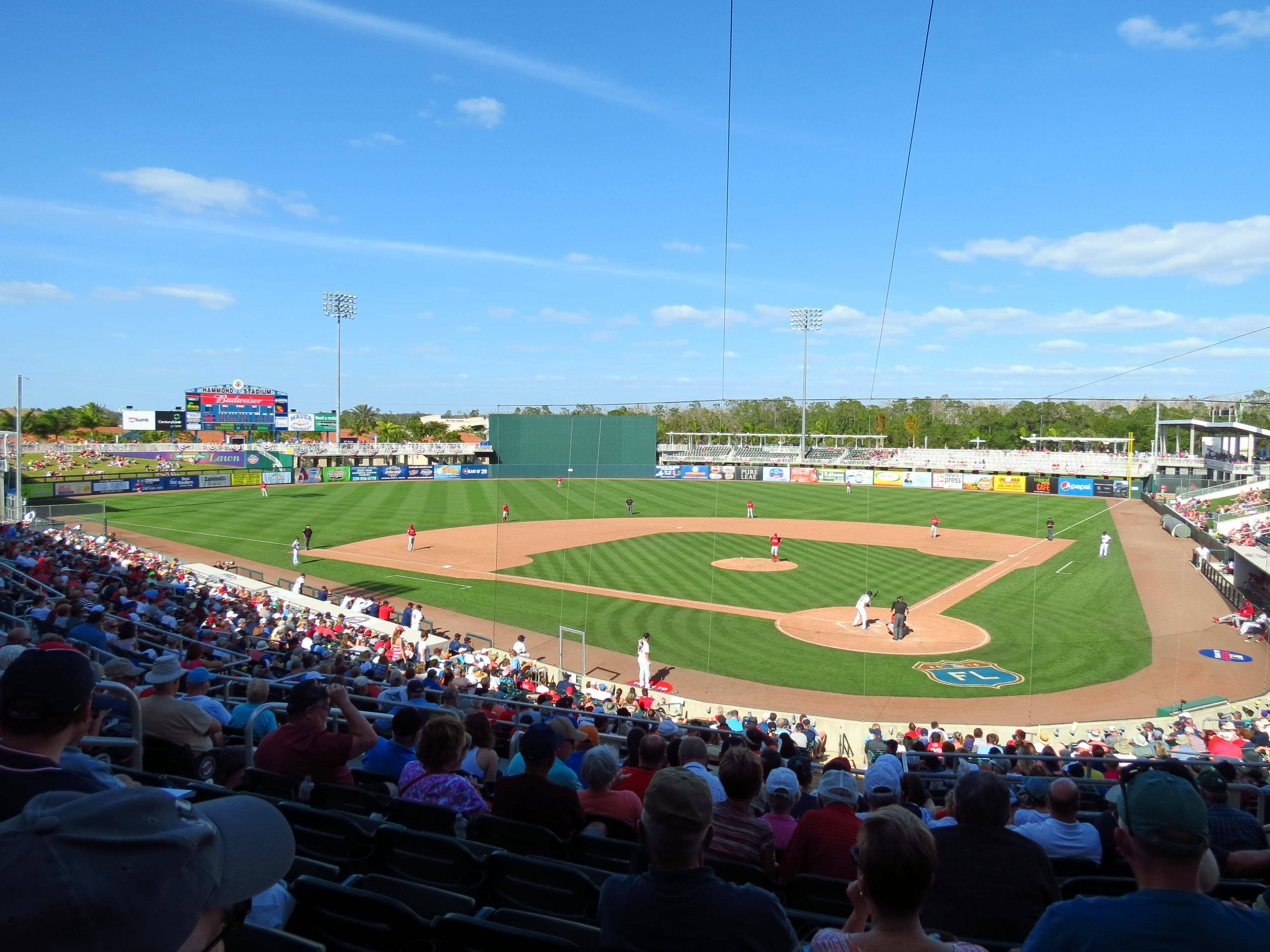
Hammond Stadium (Twins)

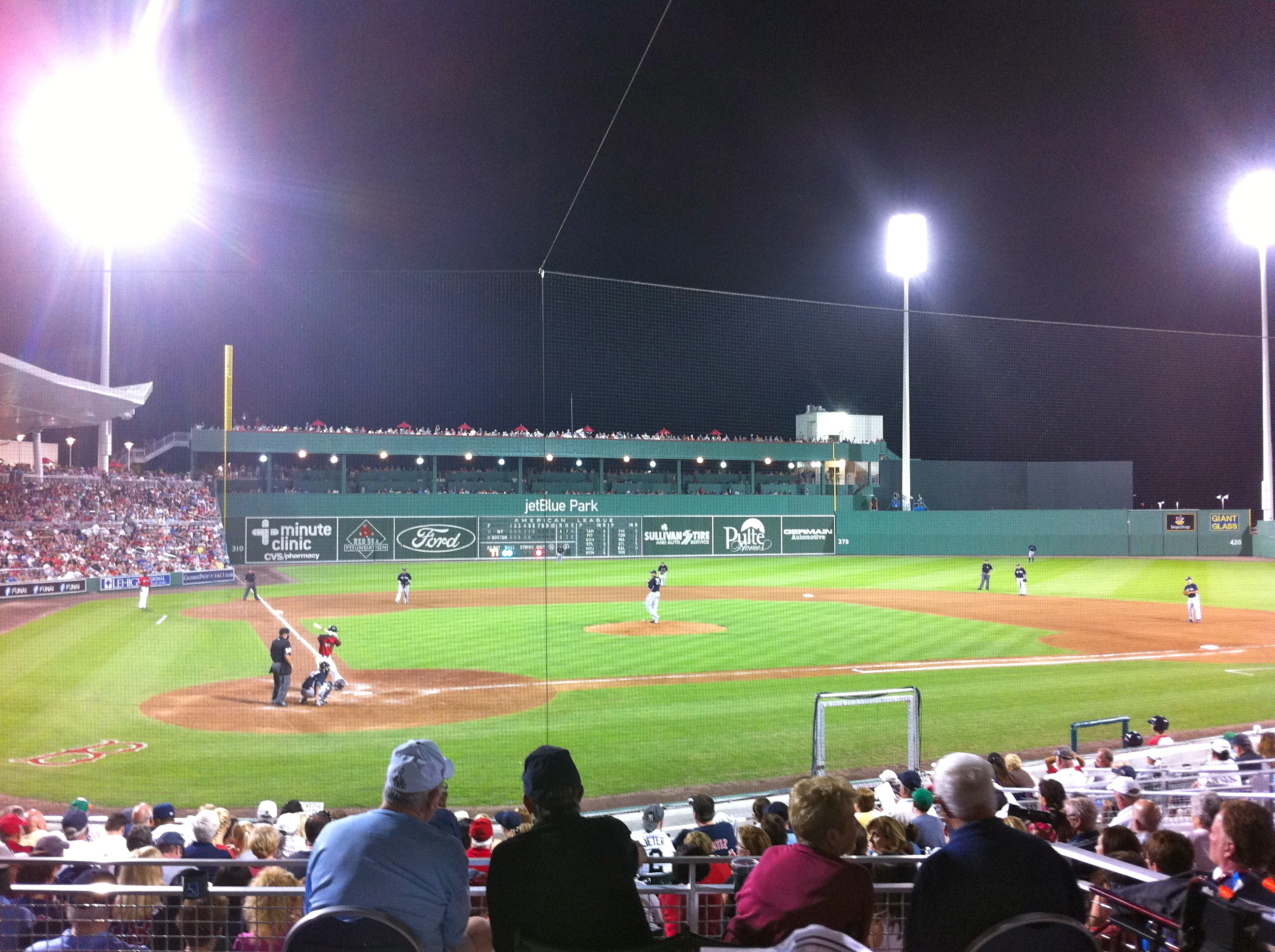
JetBlue Park (Red Sox)

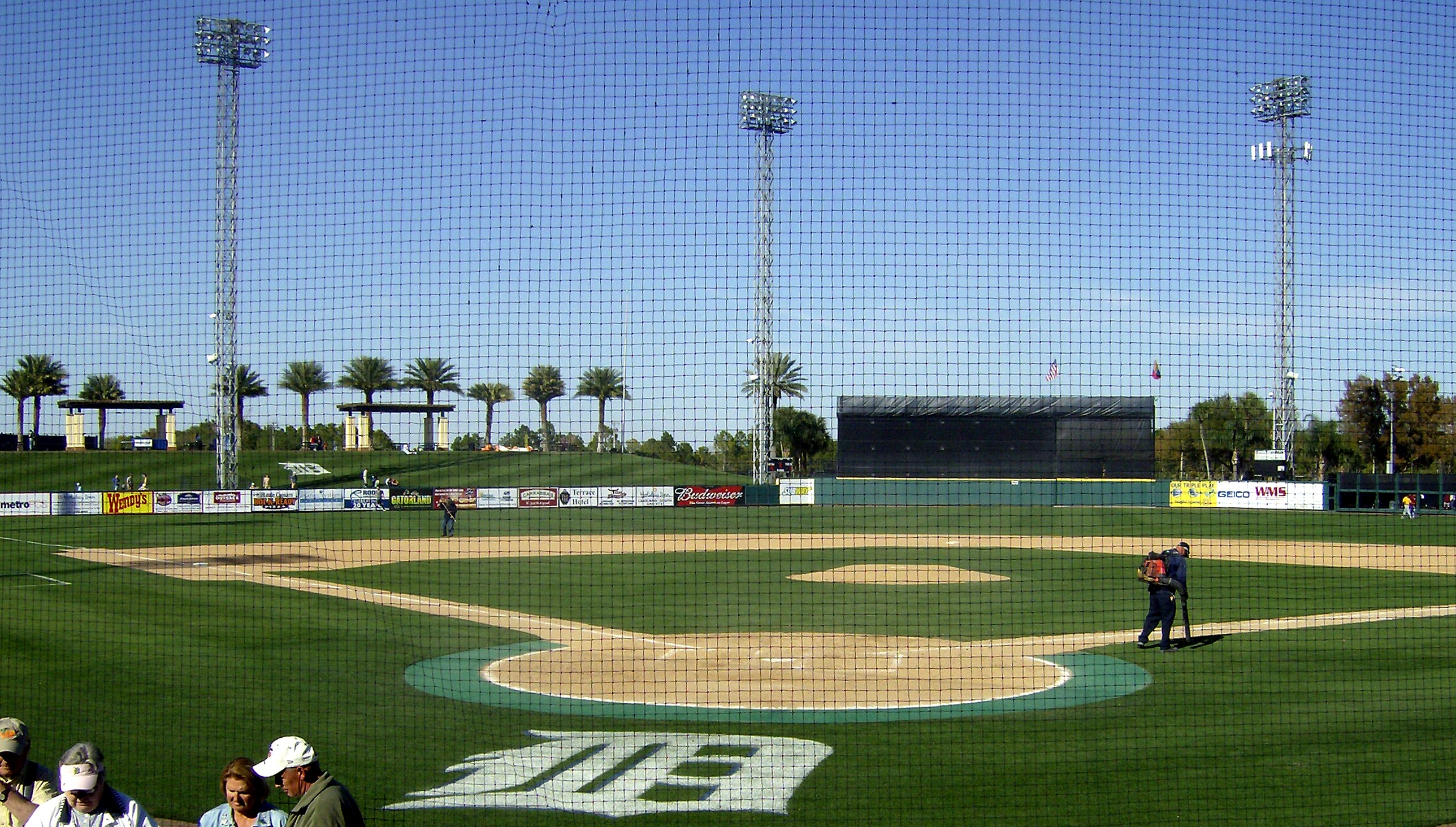
Joker Marchant Stadium (Tigers)

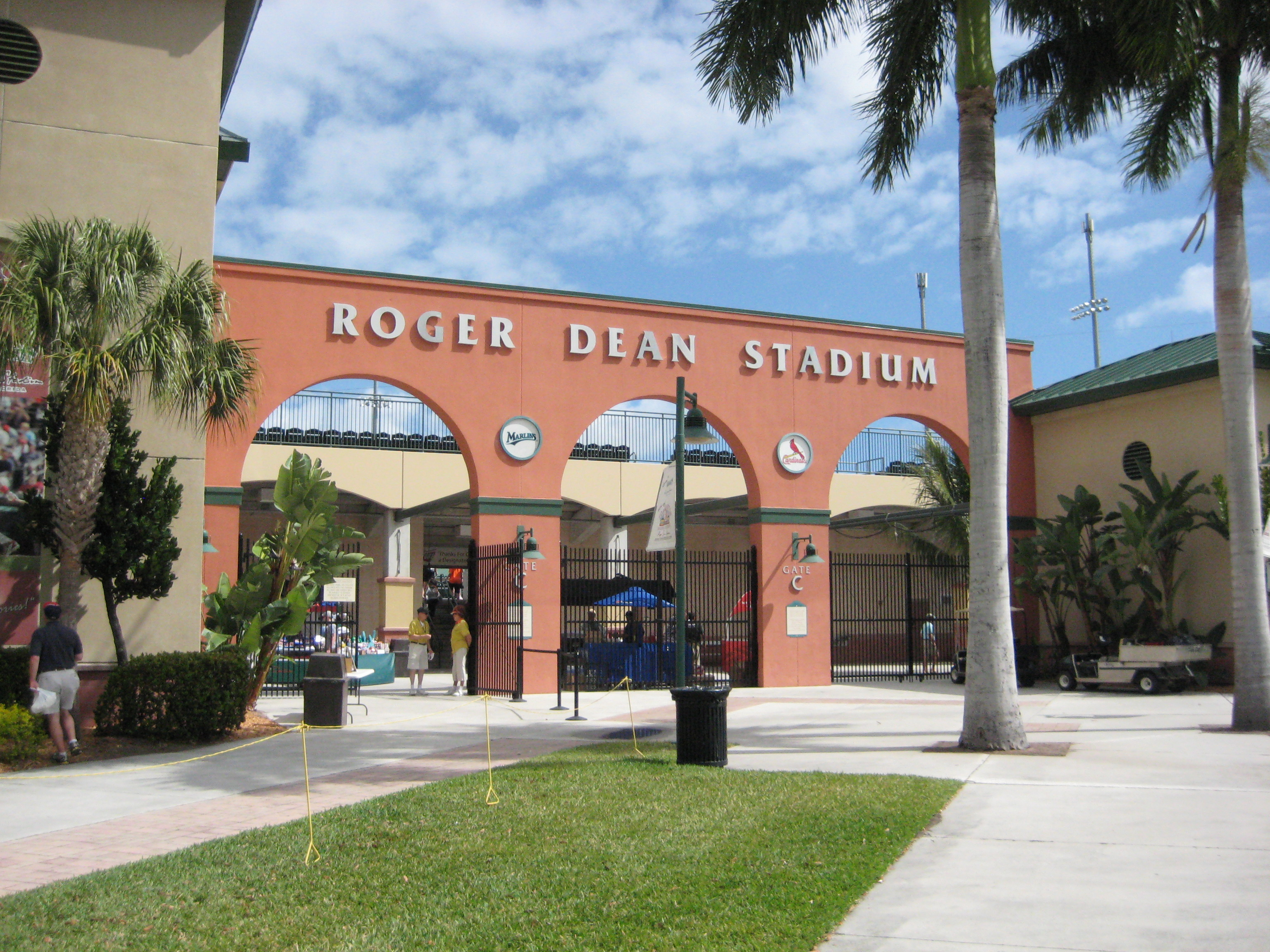
Roger Dean Stadium (Cardinals, Marlins)

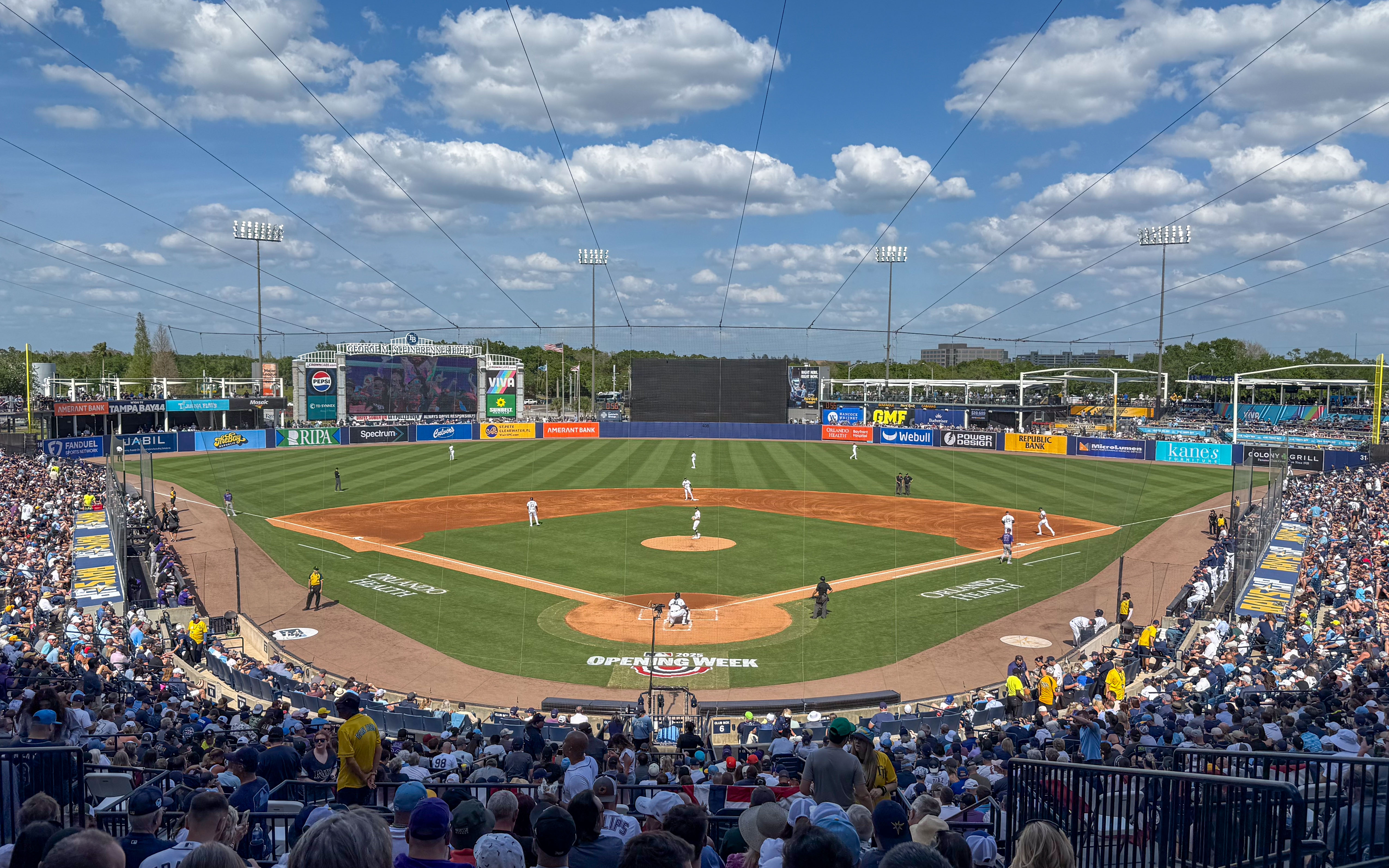
George M. Steinbrenner Field (Yankees)

== See also ==
- List of Rookie baseball stadiums
- List of Arizona Complex League stadiums
