= List of Arizona Complex League stadiums =

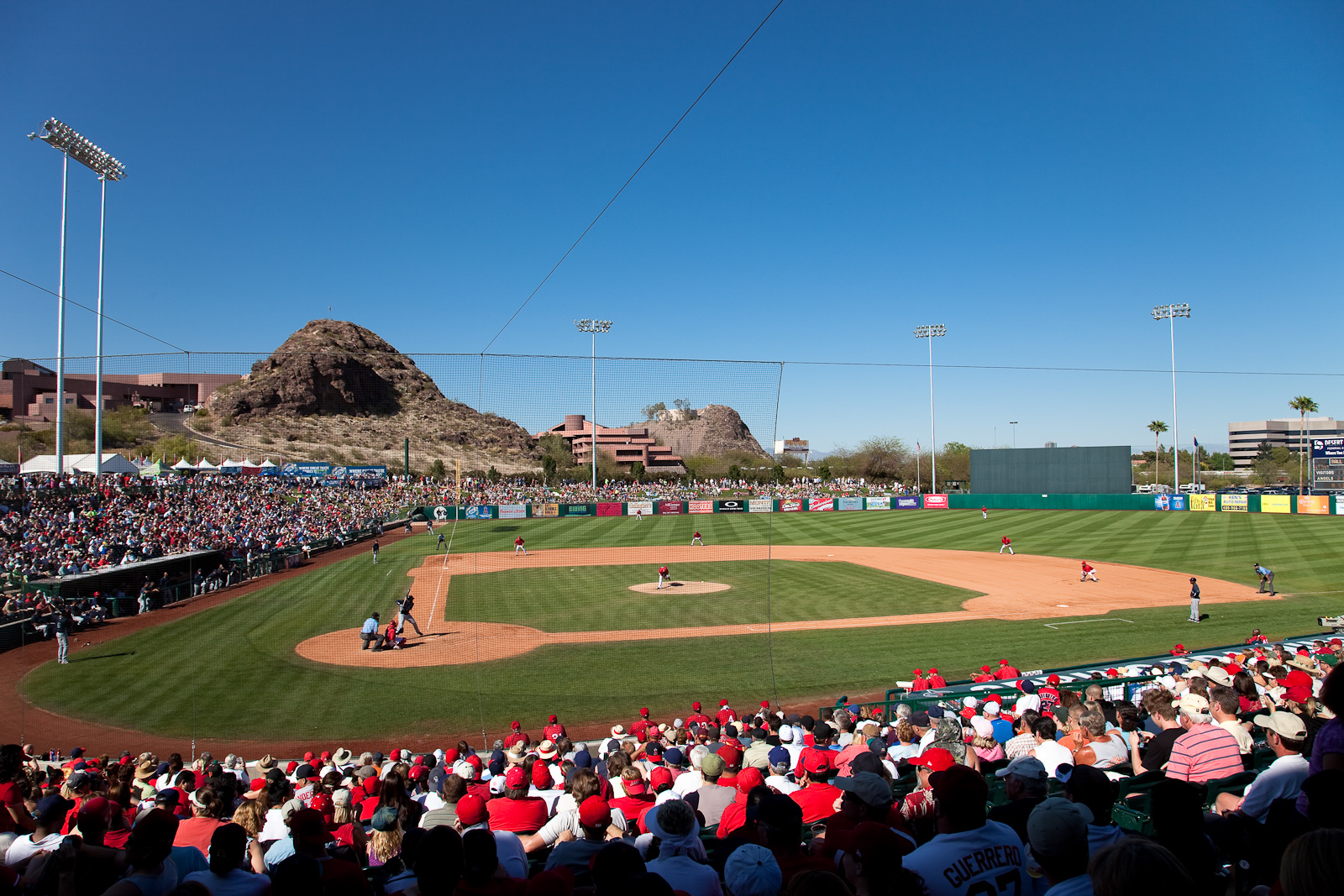
Tempe Diablo Stadium is the oldest stadium in the league and home of the Angels.

There are ten stadiums in use by Arizona Complex League baseball teams, all located in Arizona. The oldest is Tempe Diablo Stadium (1968) in Tempe, home of the Angels. The newest stadium is Sloan Park (2014) in Mesa, the home field of the Cubs. One stadium was built in each of the 1960s and 1980s, three in each of the 1990s and 2000s, and two in the 2010s. The highest seating capacity is 15,000 at Sloan Park; the lowest capacity is 8,000 at American Family Fields of Phoenix, where the Brewers play. All stadiums have a grass surface.

== Stadiums and Map ==
Arizona Complex League stadium locations
- West Division
- Central Division
- East Division

Name	Team(s)	Location	Opened	Capacity	Ref(s)
American Family Fields of Phoenix	ACL Brewers	Phoenix	1988	8,000	
Camelback Ranch	ACL Dodgers; ACL White Sox	Phoenix	2009	12,000	
Fitch Park	ACL Athletics	Mesa	1997	10,000	
Goodyear Ballpark	ACL Guardians; ACL Reds	Goodyear	2009	10,000	
Peoria Sports Complex	ACL Mariners; ACL Padres	Peoria	1994	12,882	
Salt River Fields at Talking Stick	ACL D-backs; ACL Rockies	Scottsdale	2011	11,000	
Scottsdale Stadium	ACL Giants	Scottsdale	1992	12,000	
Sloan Park	ACL Cubs	Mesa	2014	15,000	
Surprise Stadium	ACL Rangers; ACL Royals	Surprise	2003	10,500	
Tempe Diablo Stadium	ACL Angels	Tempe	1968	9,785	

== Gallery ==
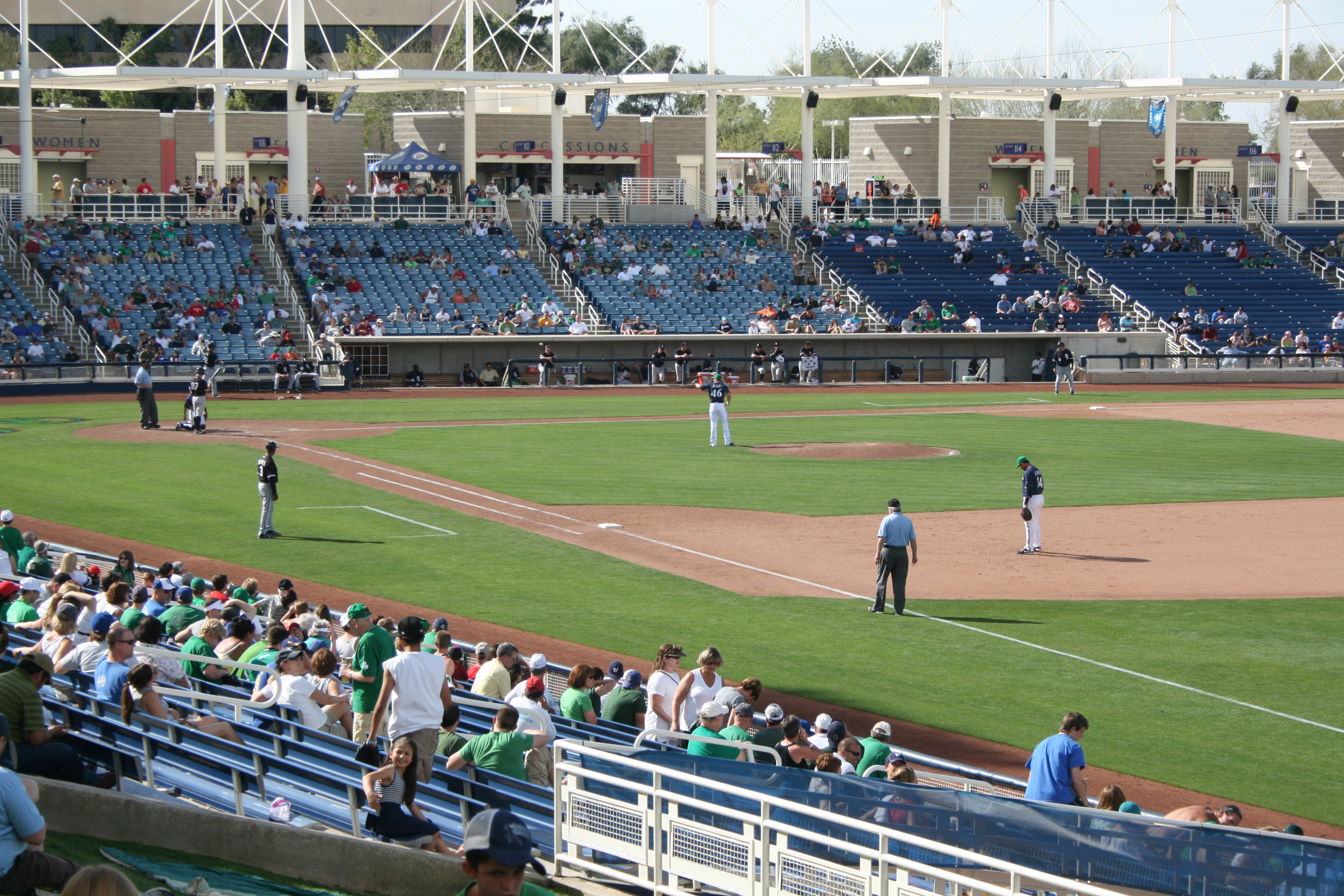
American Family Fields of Phoenix (Brewers)

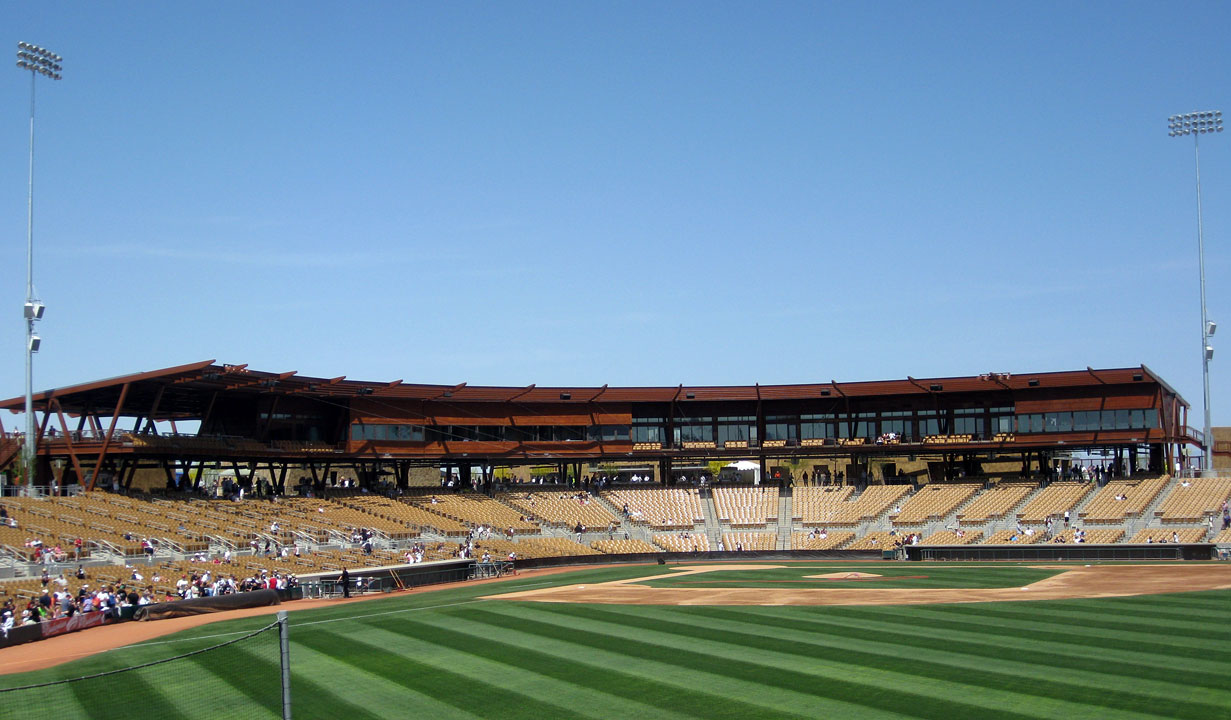
Camelback Ranch (Dodgers, White Sox)

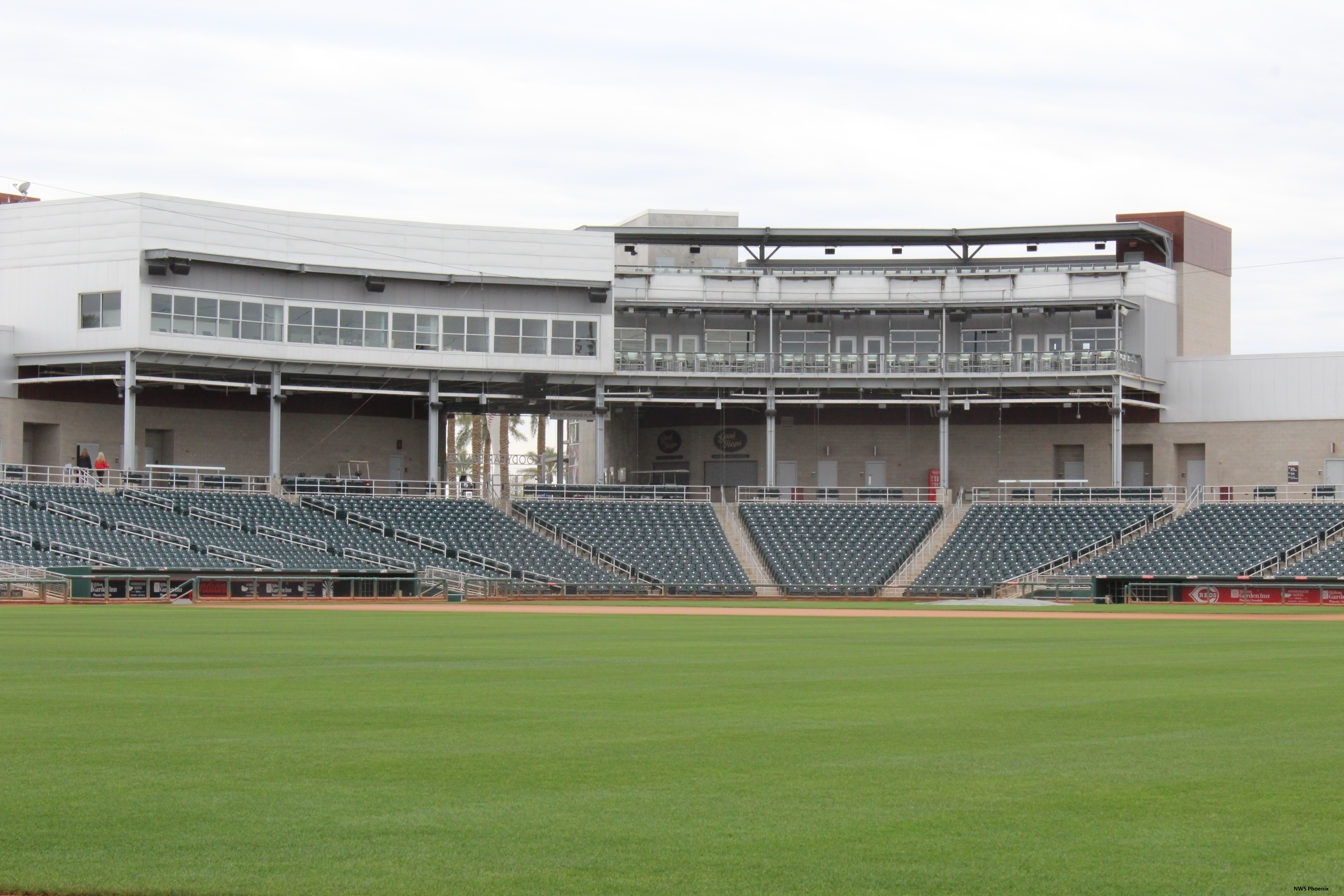
Goodyear Ballpark (Guardians, Reds)

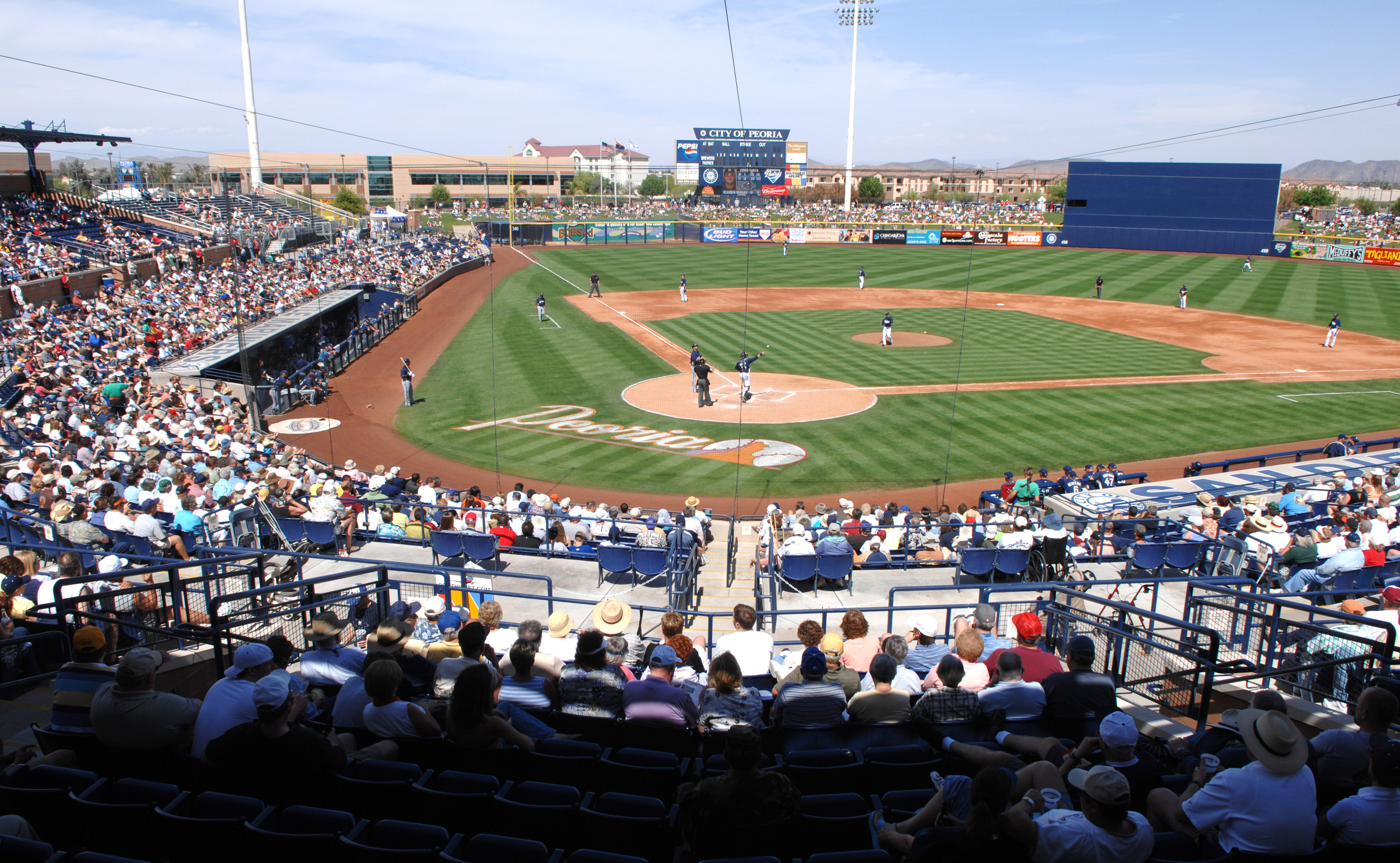
Peoria Sports Complex (Mariners, Padres)

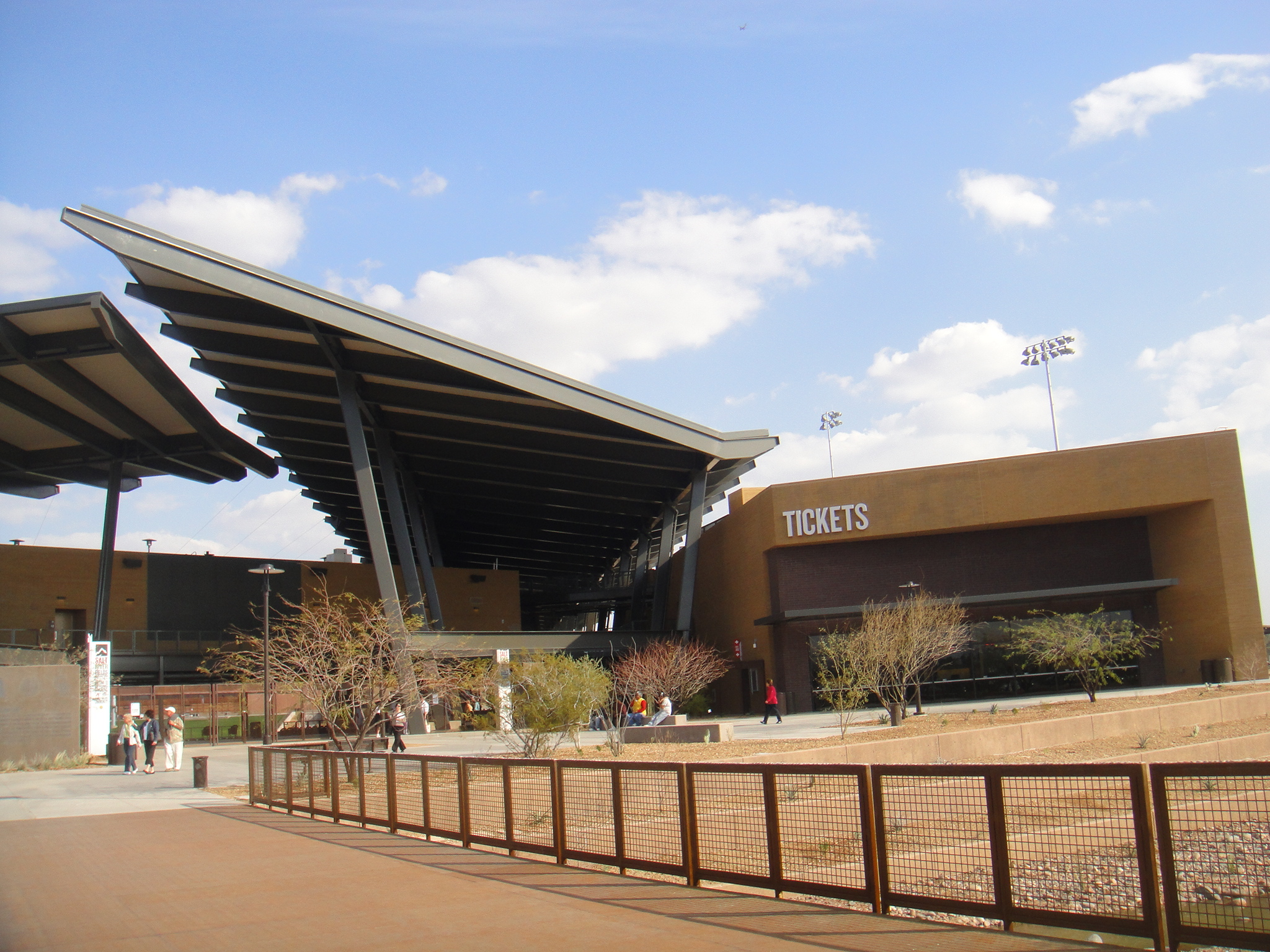
Salt River Fields at Talking Stick (Diamondbacks, Rockies)

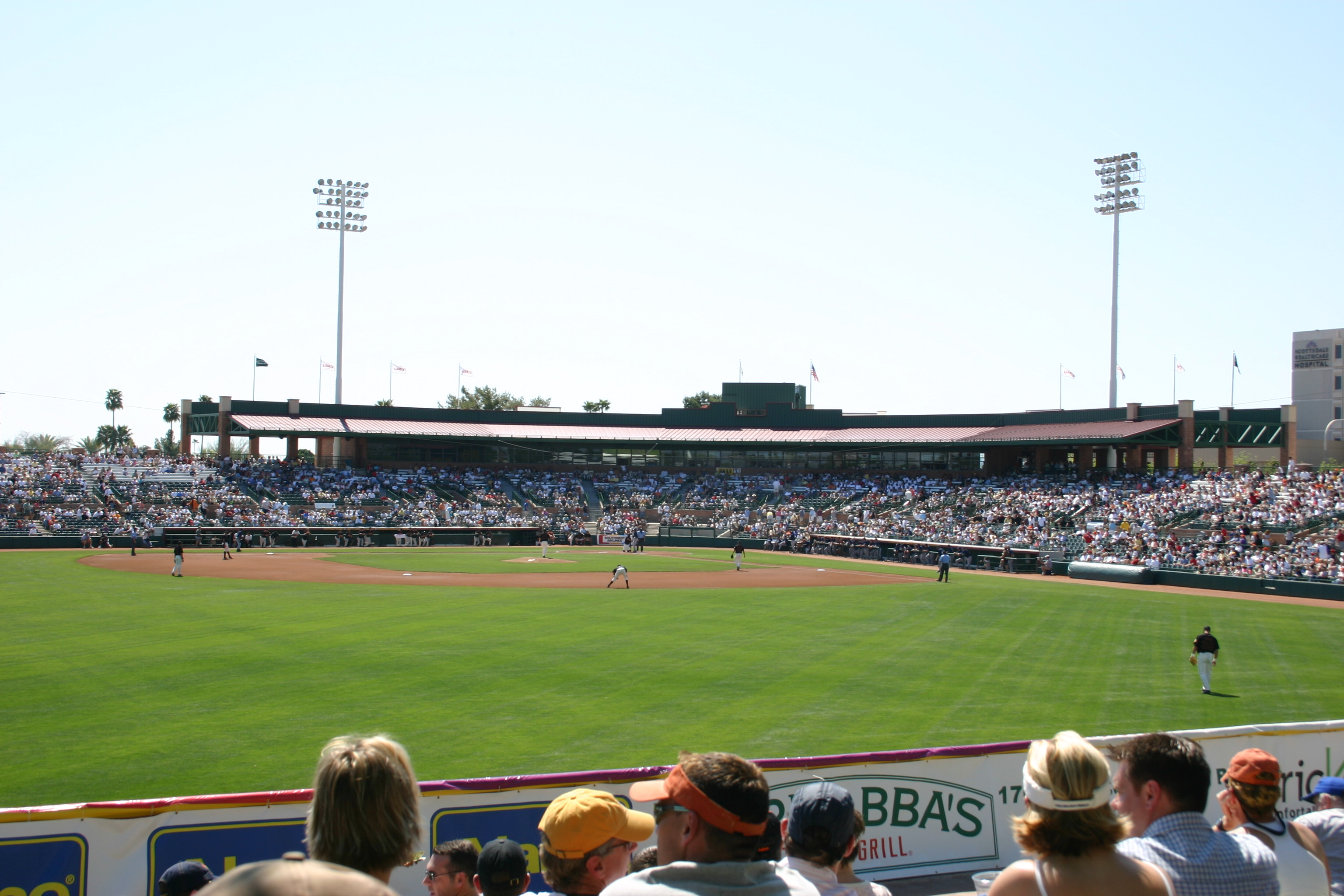
Scottsdale Stadium (Giants)

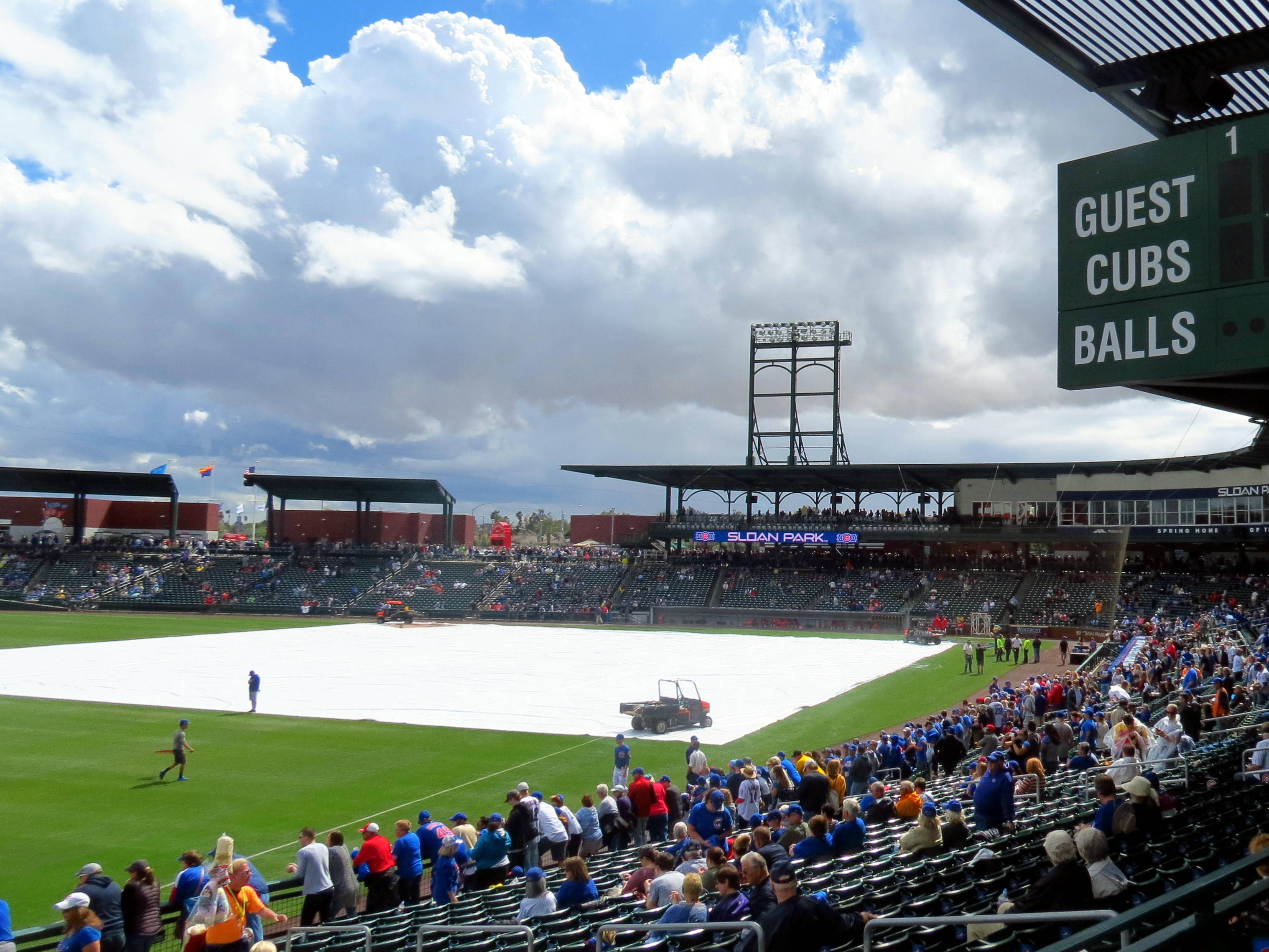
Sloan Park (Cubs)

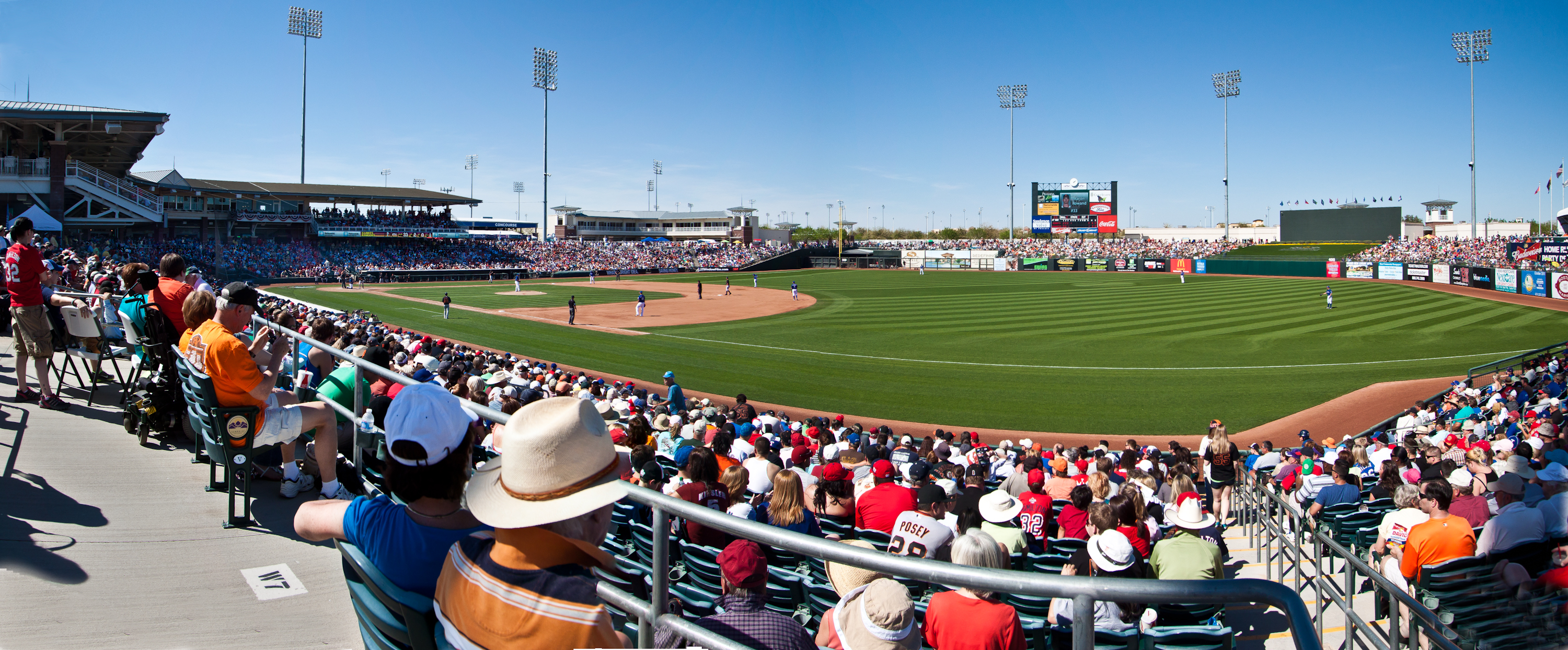
Surprise Stadium (Rangers, Royals)

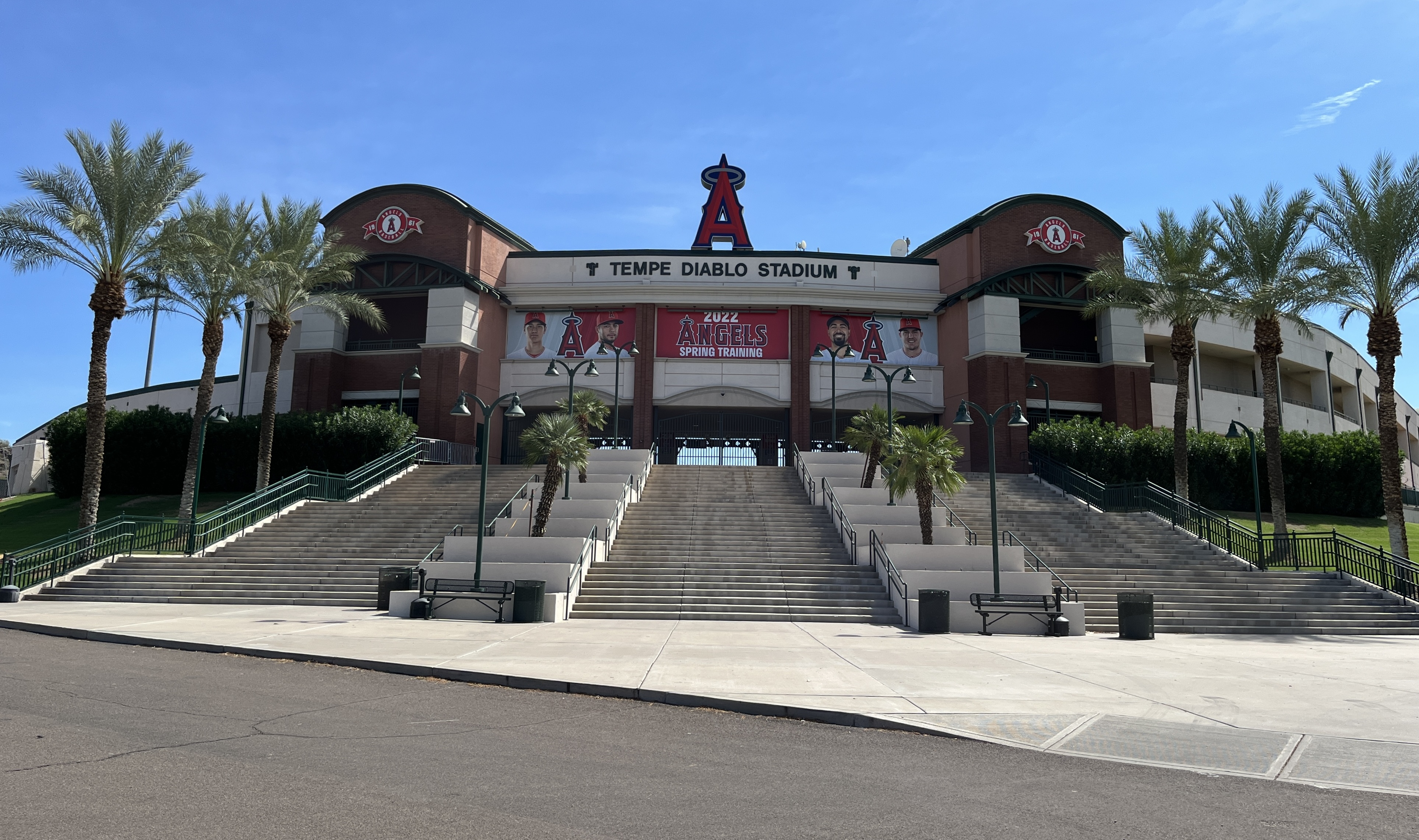
Tempe Diablo Stadium (Angels)

== See also ==
- List of Rookie baseball stadiums
- List of Florida Complex League stadiums
