= List of Rookie baseball stadiums =

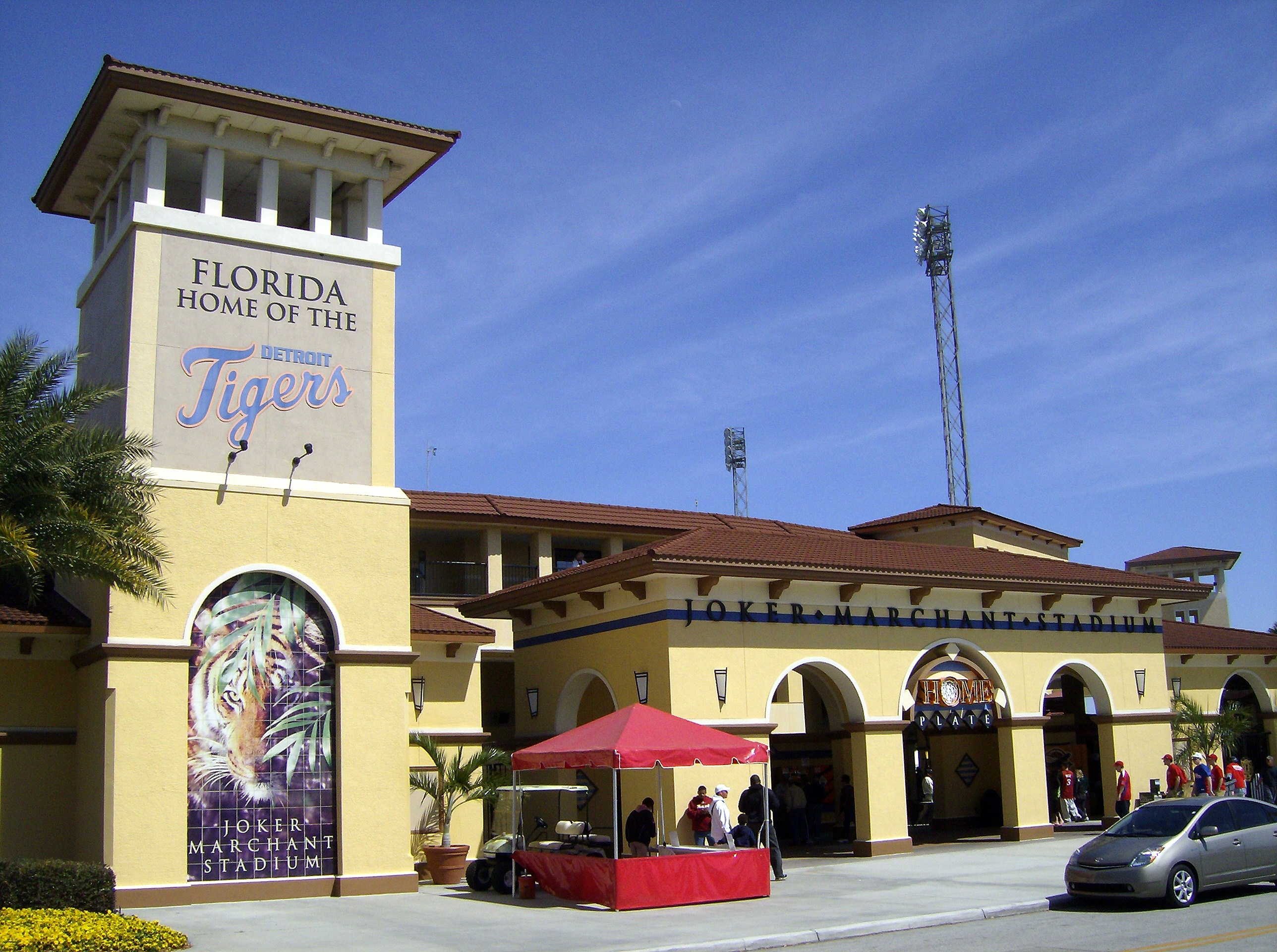
Joker Marchant Stadium is the oldest stadium among rookie-level leagues and home of the FCL Tigers.

There are 23 stadiums in use by Rookie Minor League Baseball baseball teams in the United States. The Arizona Complex League (ACL) uses 10 stadiums, and the Florida Complex League (FCL) uses 13. An additional 24 stadiums are used by teams playing in the Dominican Summer League. Of the U.S. stadiums, the oldest is Joker Marchant Stadium (1966) in Lakeland, Florida, home of the FCL Tigers. The newest stadium is CoolToday Park (2019) in North Port, Florida, the home field of the FCL Braves. Four stadiums were built in the 1960s, one in the 1970s, four in the 1980s, six in the 1990s, three in the 2000s, and five in the 2010s. The highest seating capacity is 15,000 at Sloan Park in Mesa, Arizona, where the ACL Cubs play. The lowest capacity is 500 at the Carpenter Complex in Clearwater, Florida, where the FCL Phillies play. All stadiums have a grass surface.

== Stadiums ==
=== Arizona Complex League ===
Name	Team(s)	Location	Opened	Capacity	Ref(s)
American Family Fields of Phoenix	ACL Brewers	Phoenix	1988	8,000	
Camelback Ranch	ACL Dodgers; ACL White Sox	Phoenix	2009	12,000	
Fitch Park	ACL Athletics	Mesa	1997	10,000	
Goodyear Ballpark	ACL Guardians; ACL Reds	Goodyear	2009	10,000	
Peoria Sports Complex	ACL Mariners; ACL Padres	Peoria	1994	12,882	
Salt River Fields at Talking Stick	ACL D-backs; ACL Rockies	Scottsdale	2011	11,000	
Scottsdale Stadium	ACL Giants	Scottsdale	1992	12,000	
Sloan Park	ACL Cubs	Mesa	2014	15,000	
Surprise Stadium	ACL Rangers; ACL Royals	Surprise	2003	10,500	
Tempe Diablo Stadium	ACL Angels	Tempe	1968	9,785	

=== Florida Complex League ===
Name	Team(s)	Location	Opened	Capacity	Ref(s)
Bobby Mattick Training Center at Englebert Complex	FCL Blue Jays	Dunedin	1978	5,500	
CACTI Park of the Palm Beaches	FCL Astros; FCL Nationals	West Palm Beach	2017	6,500	
Charlotte Sports Park	FCL Rays	Port Charlotte	1988	7,000	
Clover Park	FCL Mets	Port St. Lucie	1988	7,160	
CoolToday Park	FCL Braves	North Port	2019	9,500	
Ed Smith Stadium	FCL Orioles	Sarasota	1989	8,340	
George M. Steinbrenner Field	FCL Yankees	Tampa	1996	11,000	
Hammond Stadium	FCL Twins	Fort Myers	1991	7,500	
JetBlue Park at Fenway South	FCL Red Sox	Fort Myers	2012	8,000	
Paul Owens Training Facility at Carpenter Complex	FCL Phillies	Clearwater	1967	500	
Pirate City	FCL Pirates	Bradenton	1969	7,500	
Publix Field at Joker Marchant Stadium	FCL Tigers	Lakeland	1966	8,500	
Roger Dean Chevrolet Stadium	FCL Cardinals; FCL Marlins	Jupiter	1998	7,200	

== Maps ==
Arizona Complex League stadium locations
- West Division
- Central Division
- East Division
Florida Complex League stadium locations
- North Division
- South Division
- East Division

== Gallery ==
=== Arizona Complex League ===
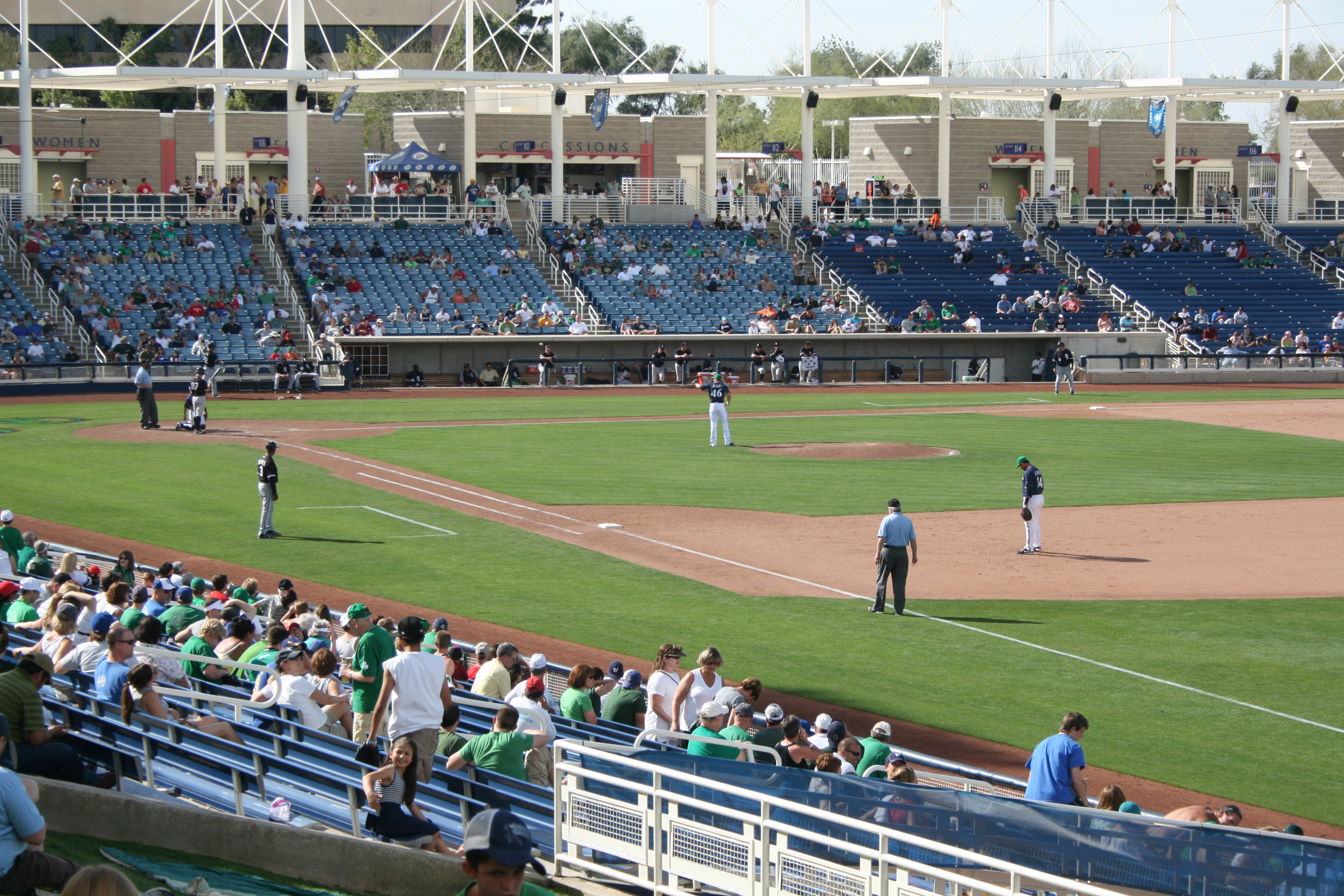
American Family Fields of Phoenix (Brewers)

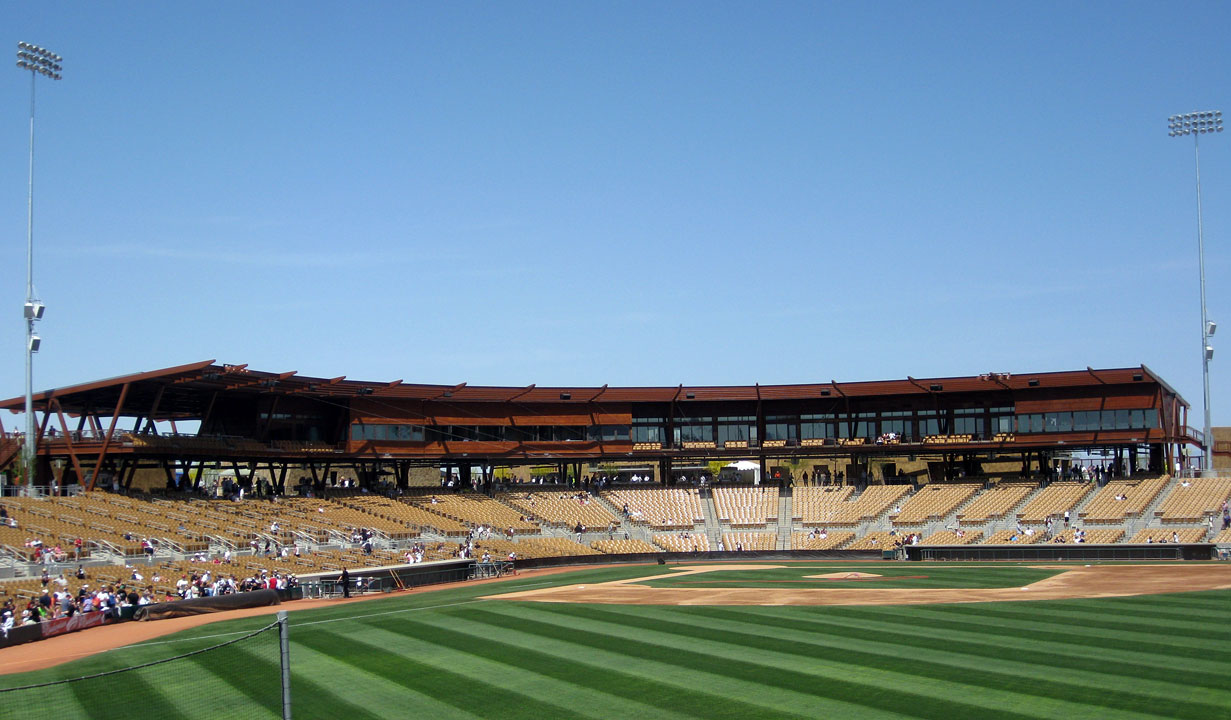
Camelback Ranch (Dodgers, White Sox)

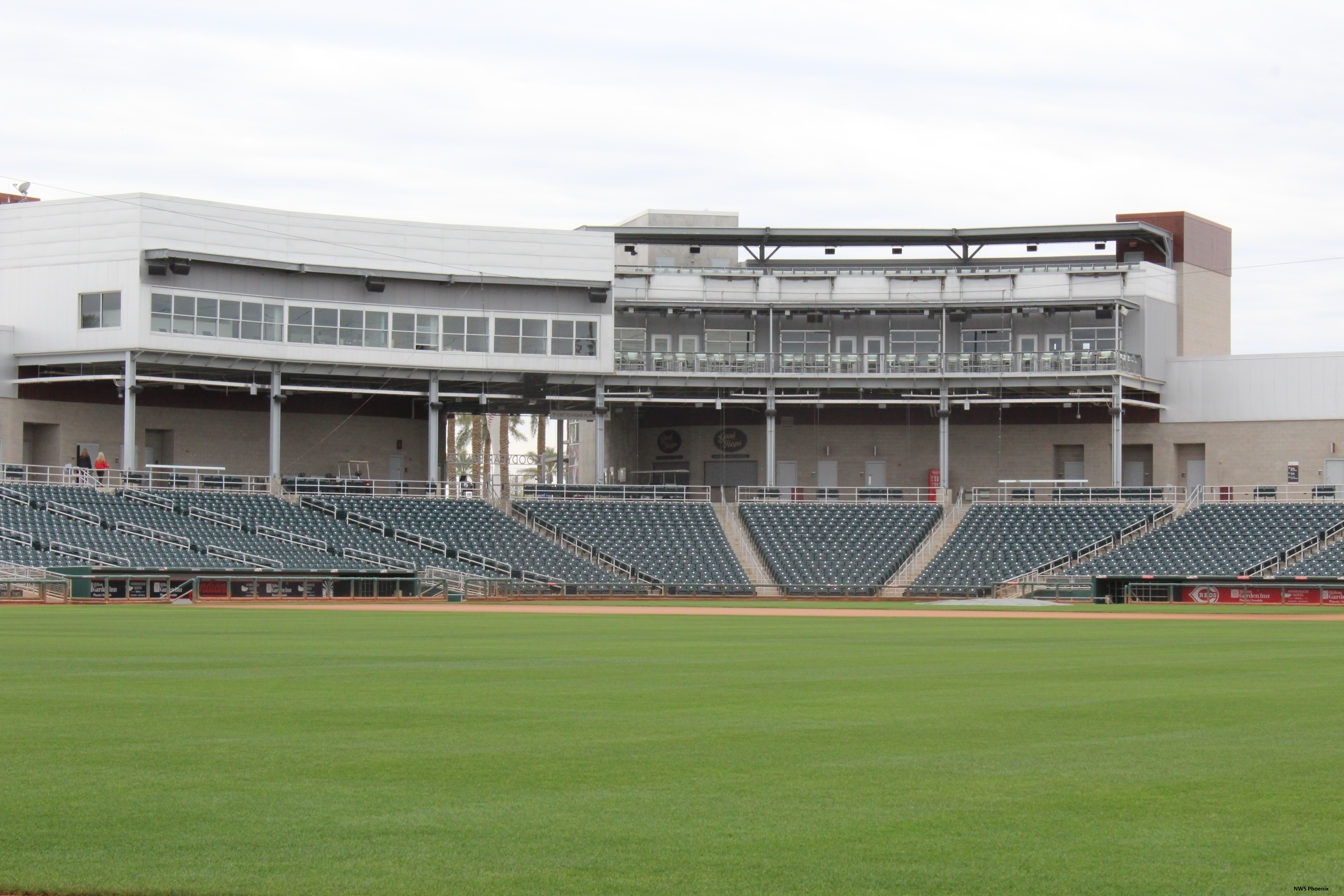
Goodyear Ballpark (Guardians, Reds)

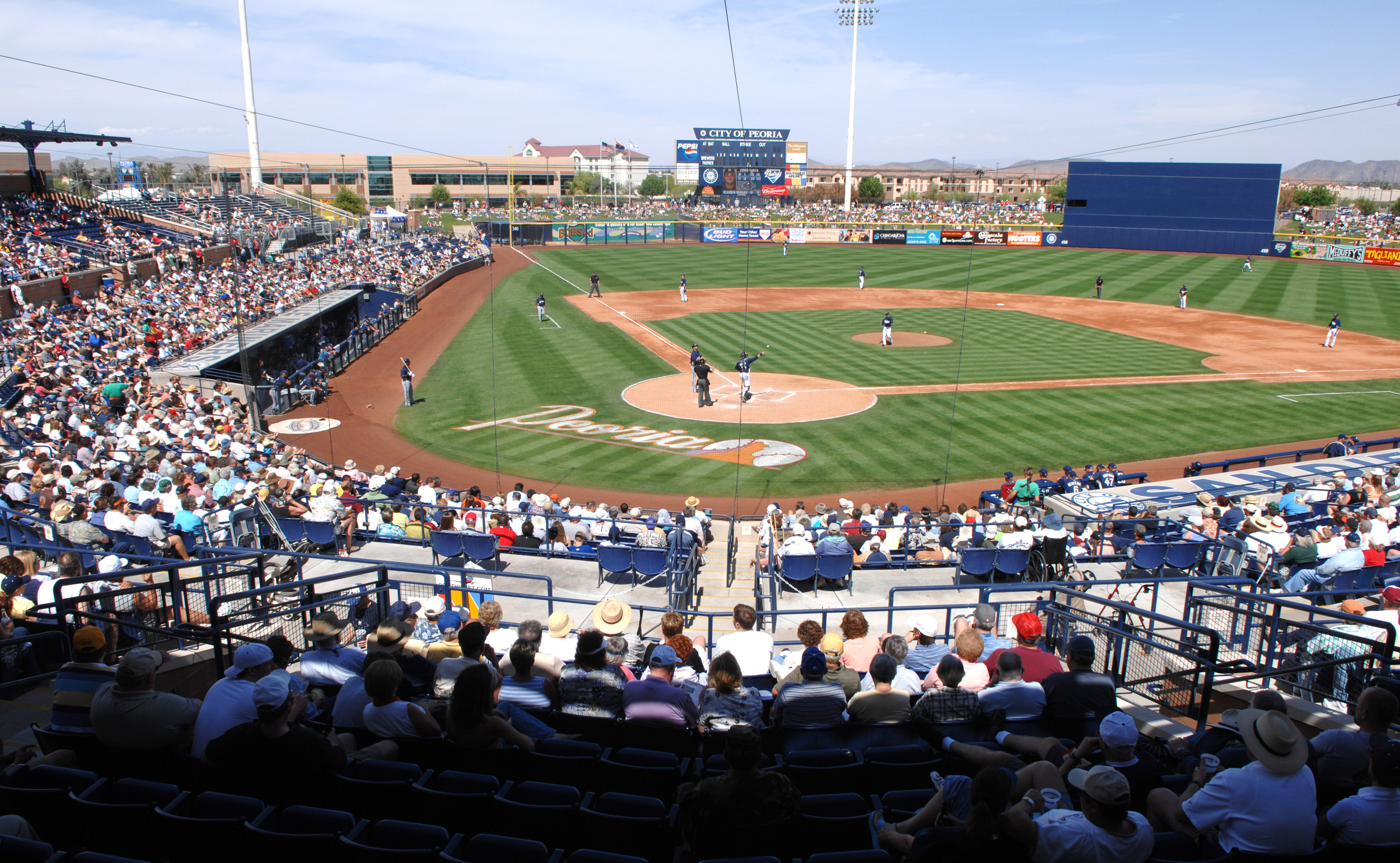
Peoria Sports Complex (Mariners, Padres)

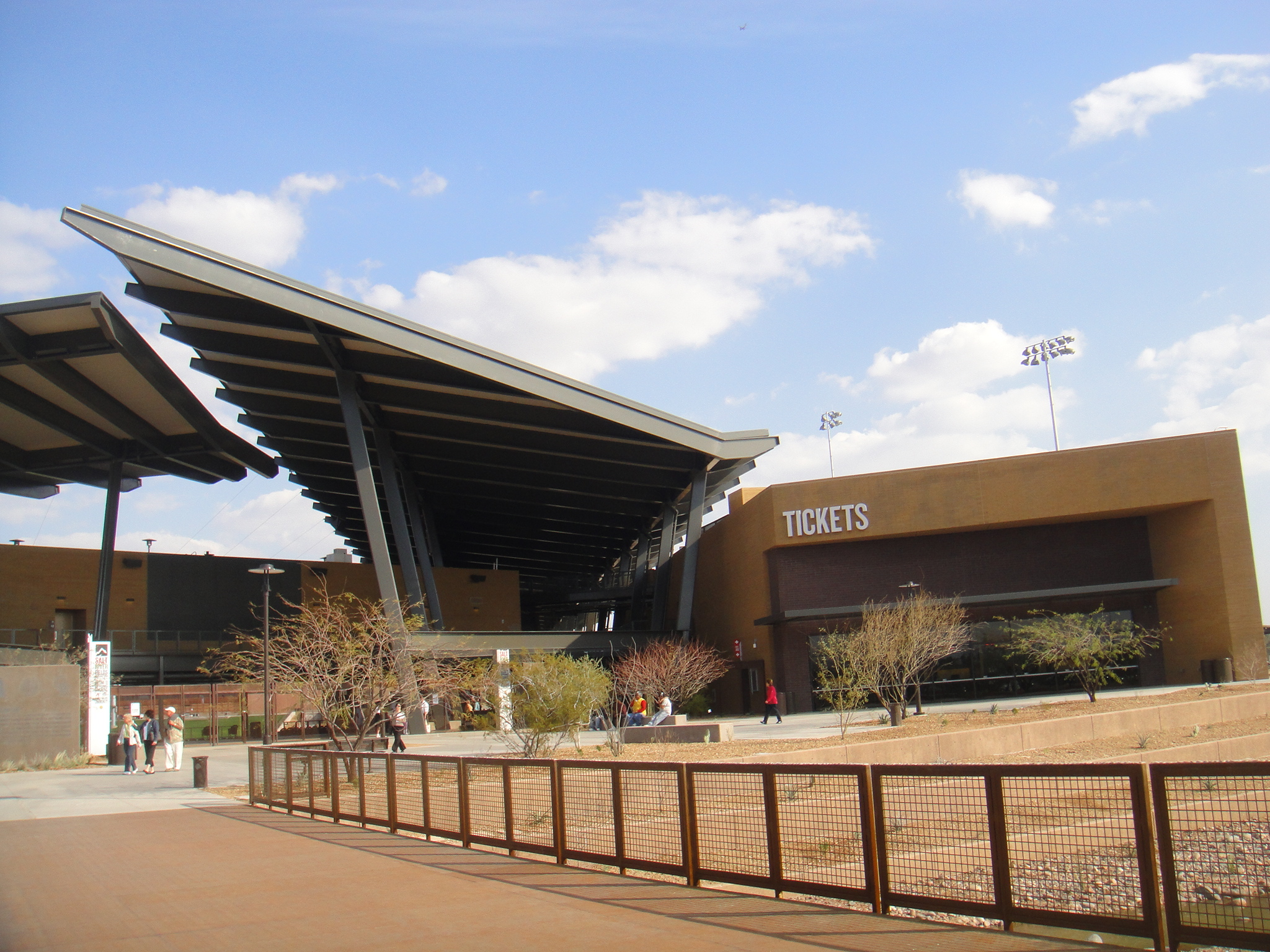
Salt River Fields at Talking Stick (Diamondbacks, Rockies)

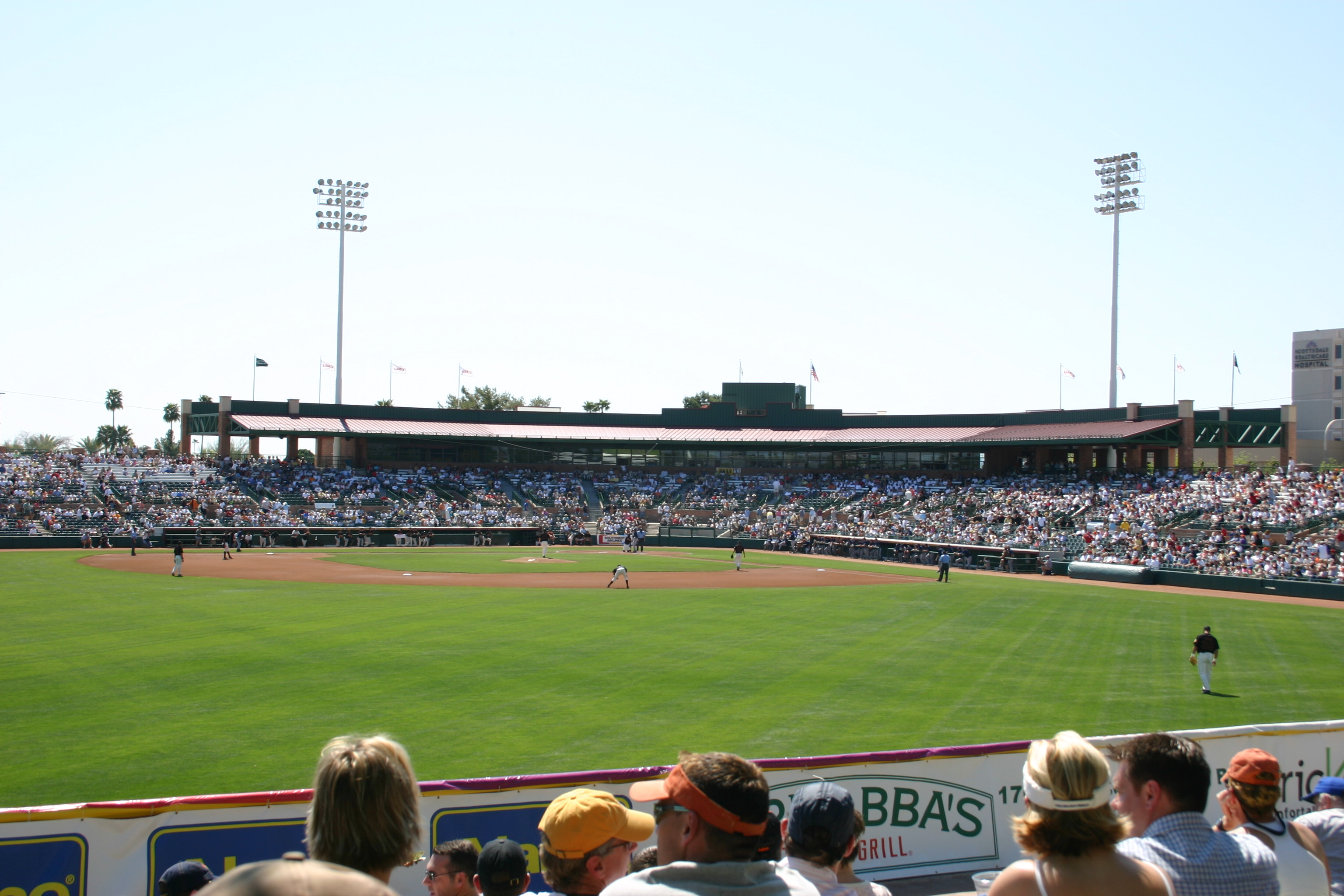
Scottsdale Stadium (Giants)

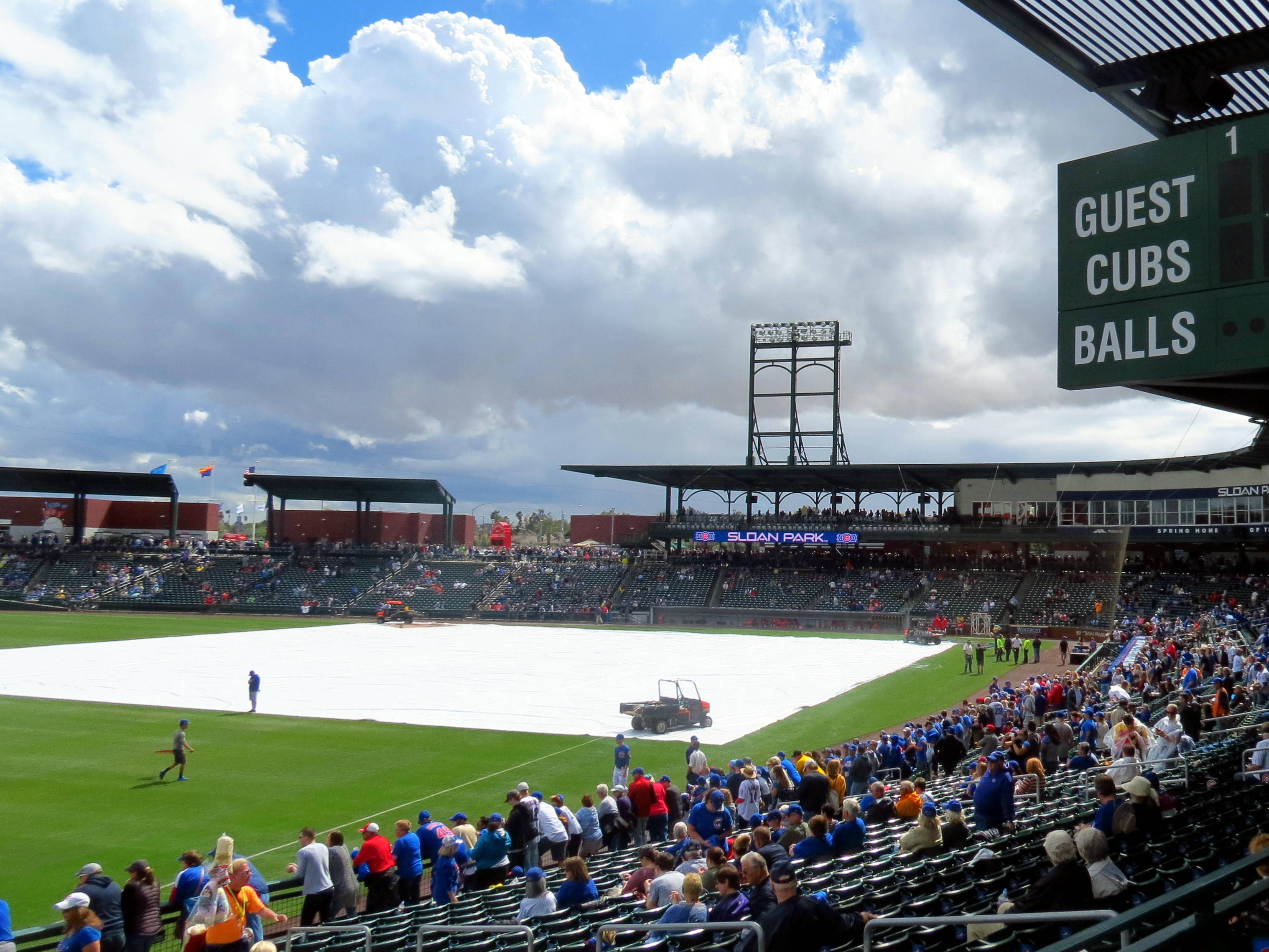
Sloan Park (Cubs)

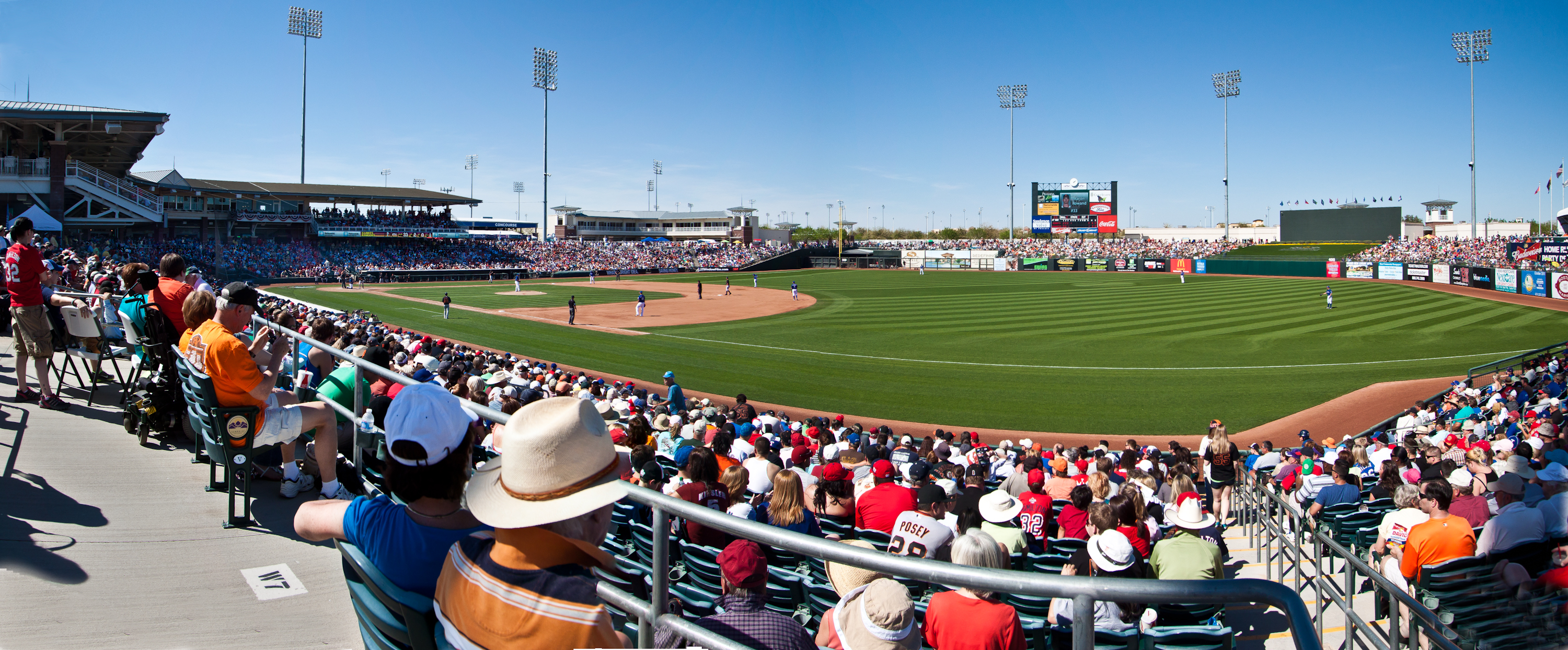
Surprise Stadium (Rangers, Royals)

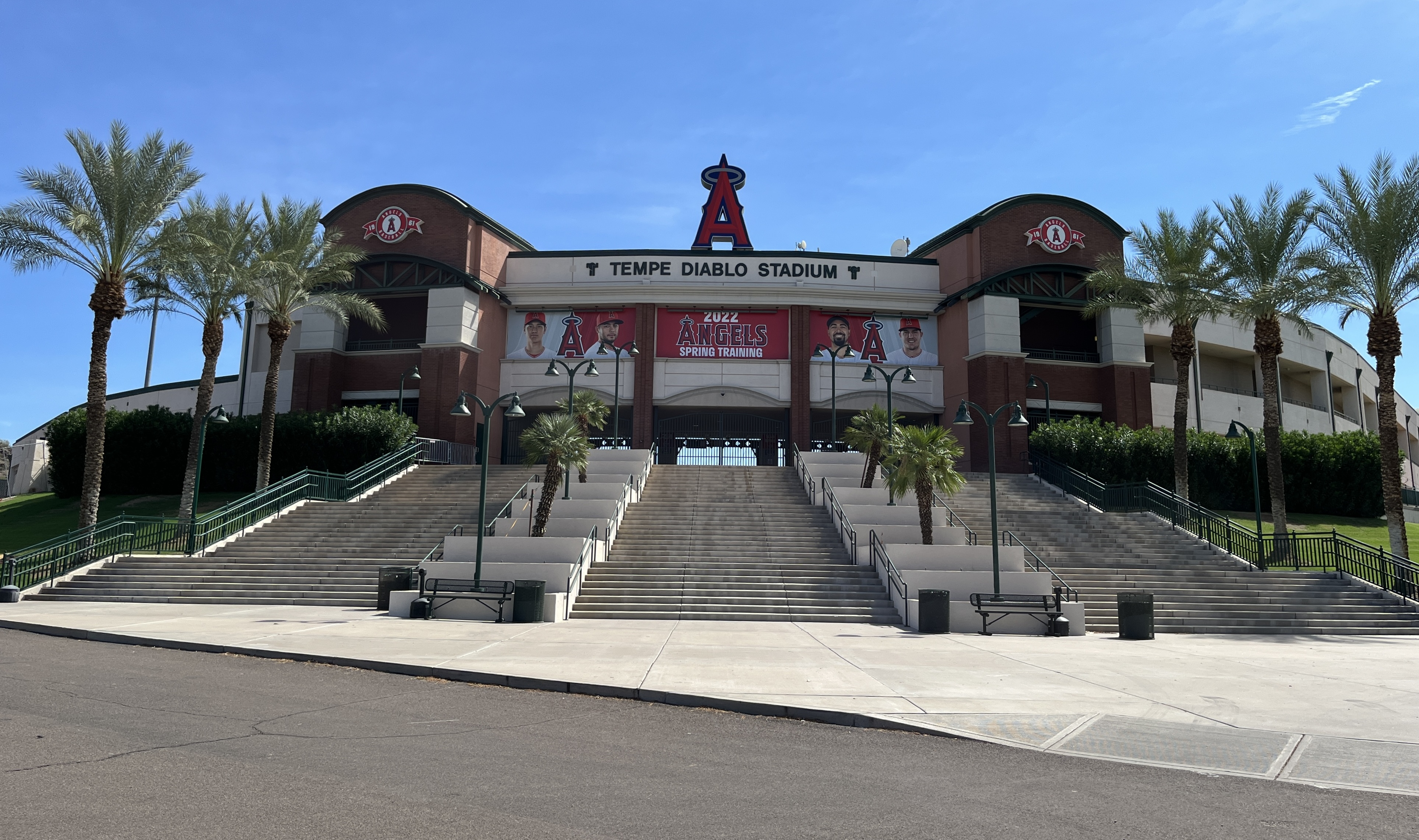
Tempe Diablo Stadium (Angels)

=== Florida Complex League ===
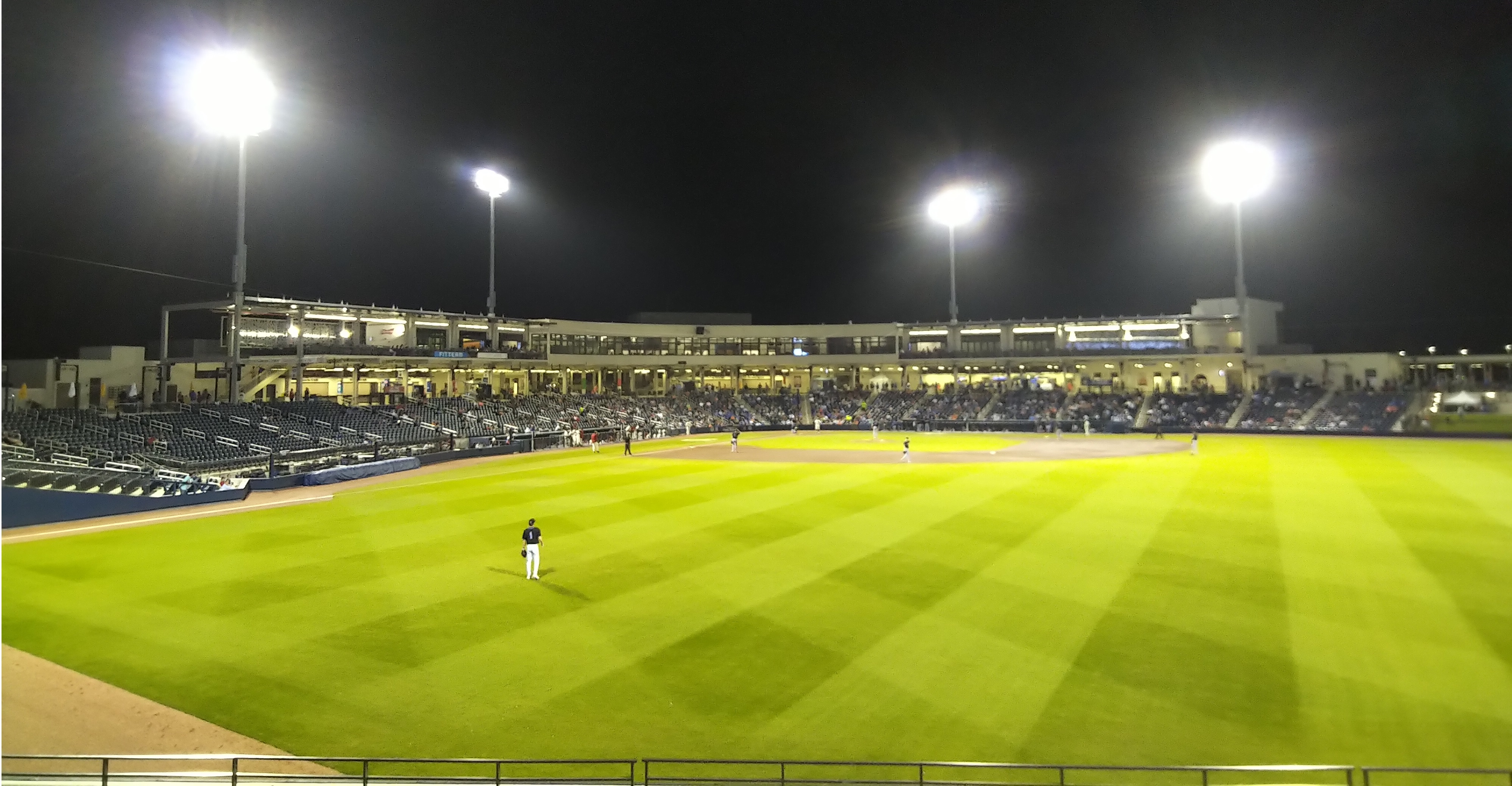
CACTI Park (Astros, Nationals)

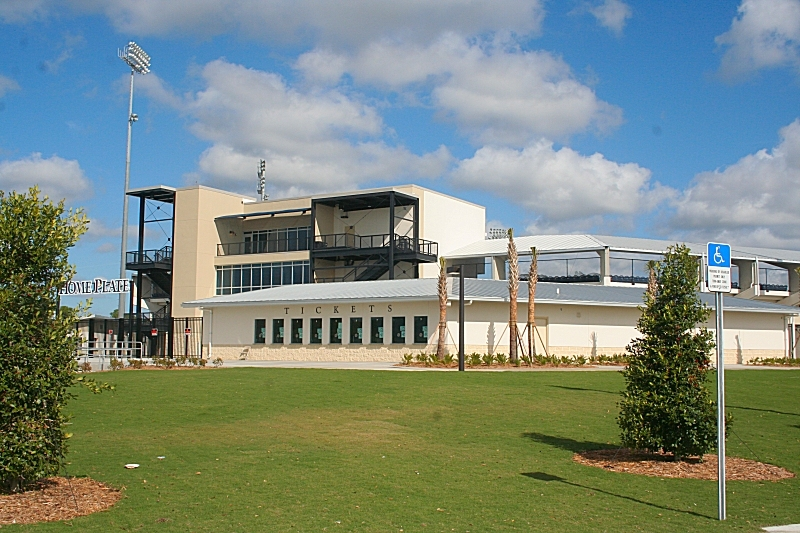
Charlotte Sports Park (Rays)

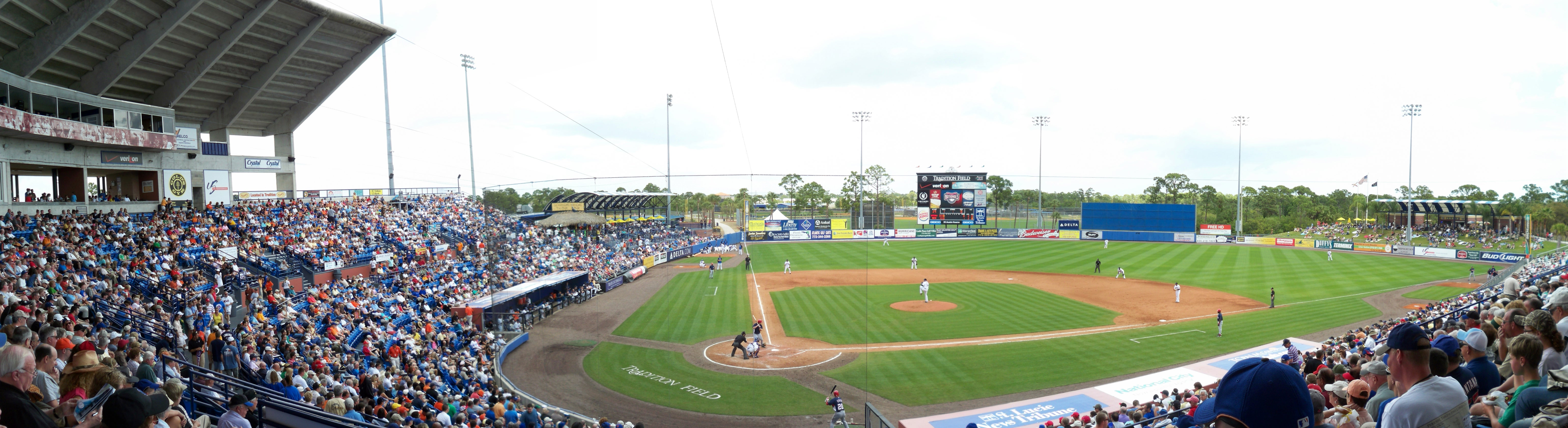
Clover Park (Mets)

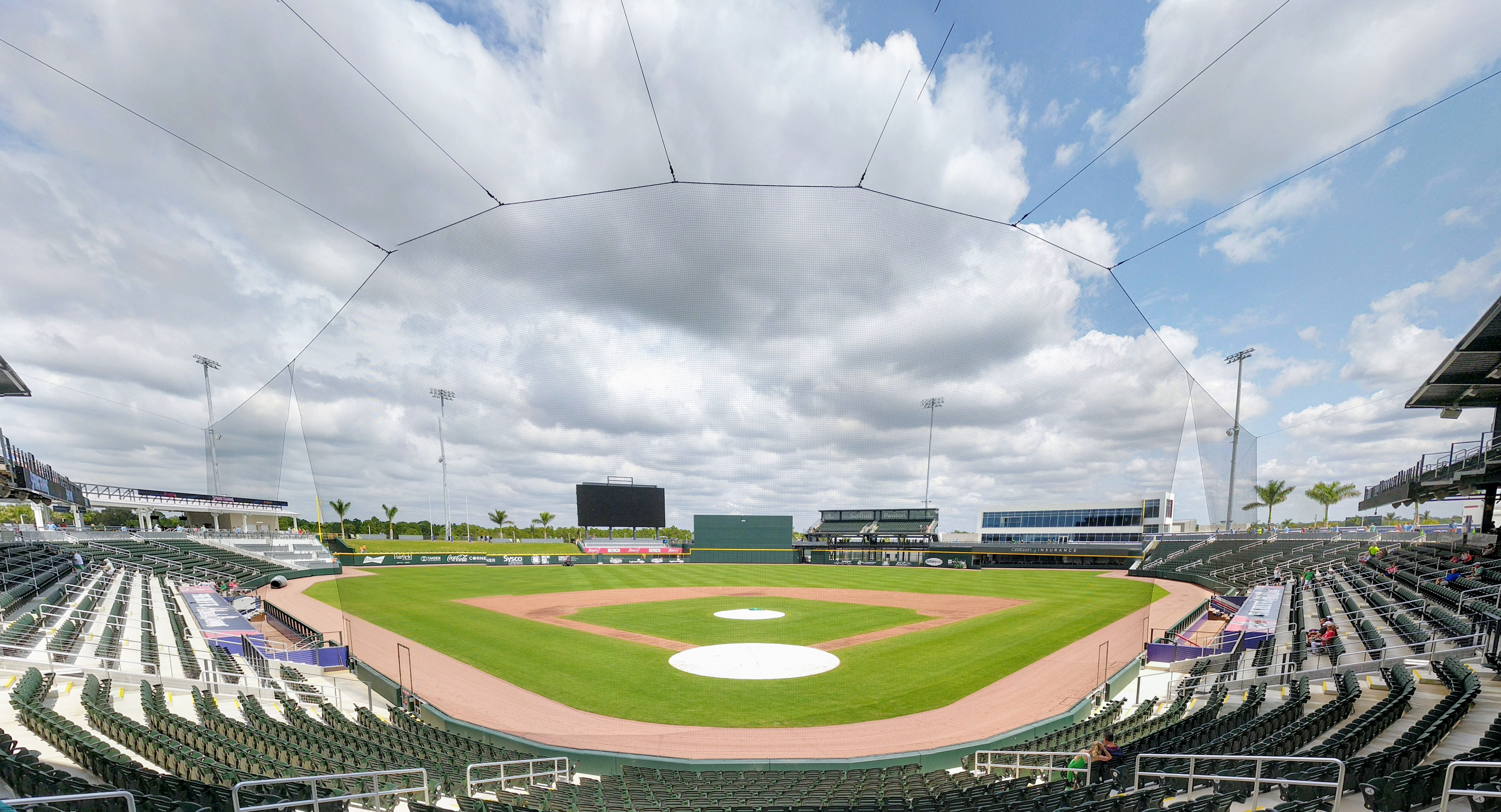
CoolToday Park (Braves)

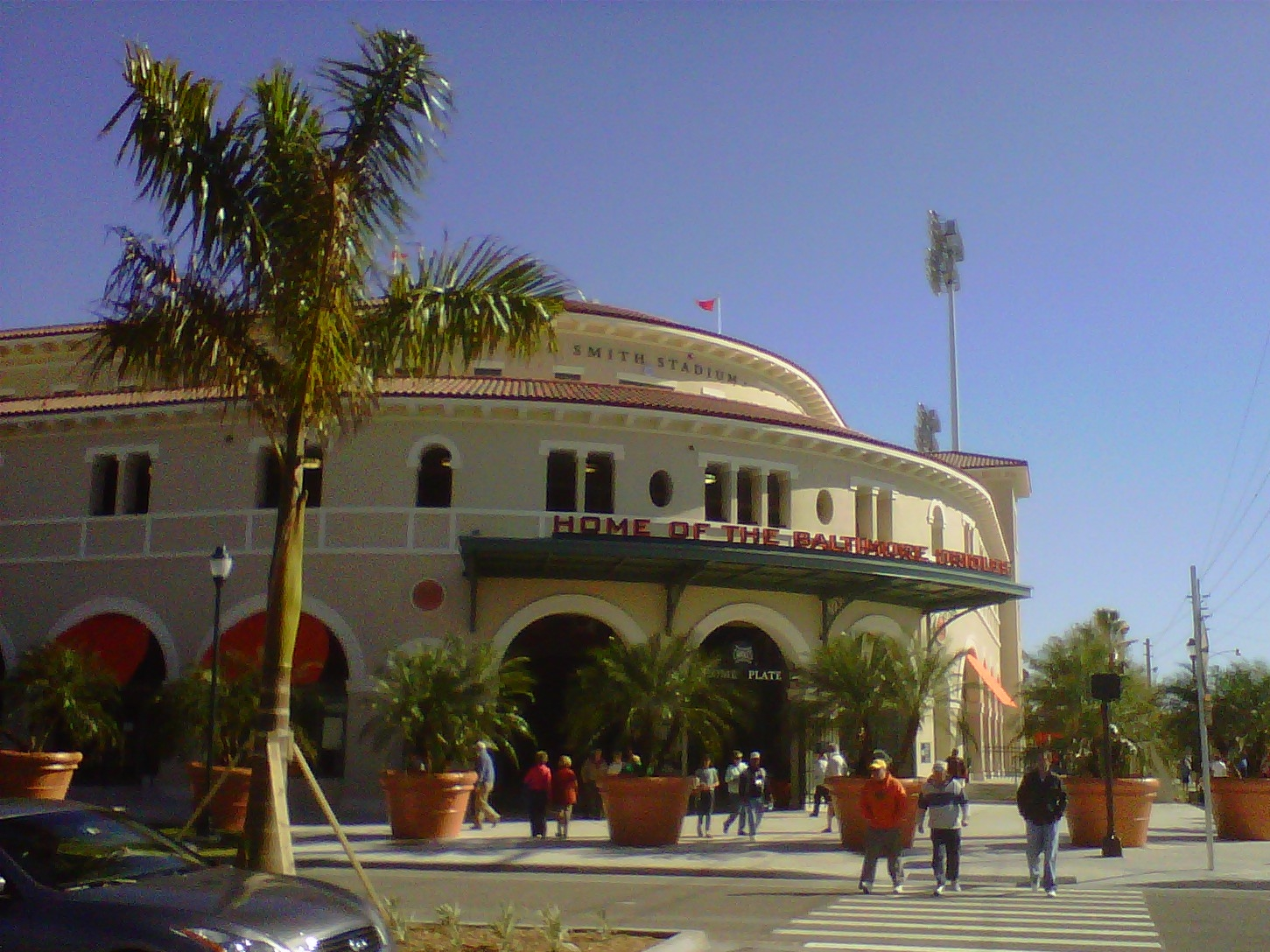
Ed Smith Stadium (Orioles)

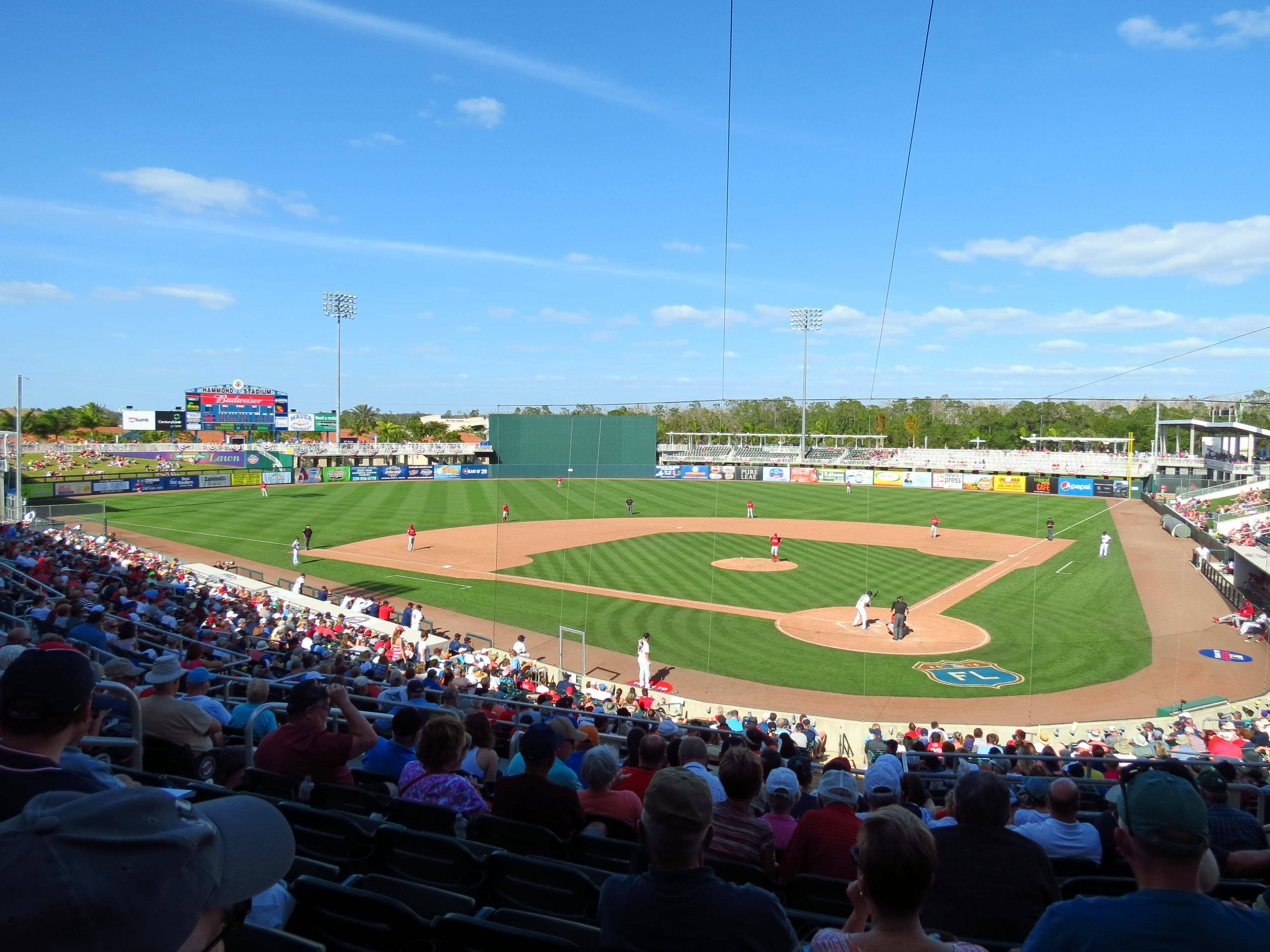
Hammond Stadium (Twins)

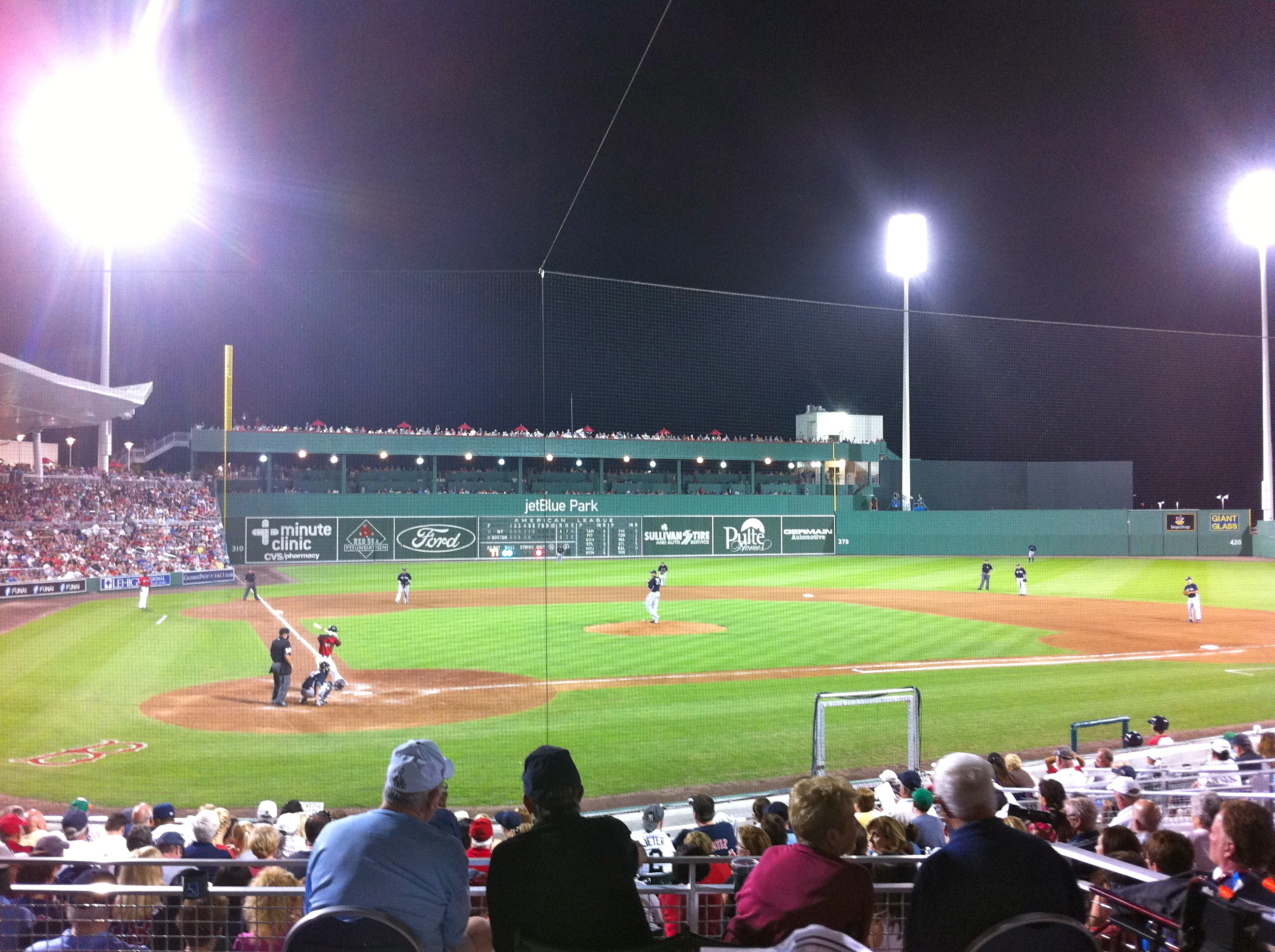
JetBlue Park (Red Sox)

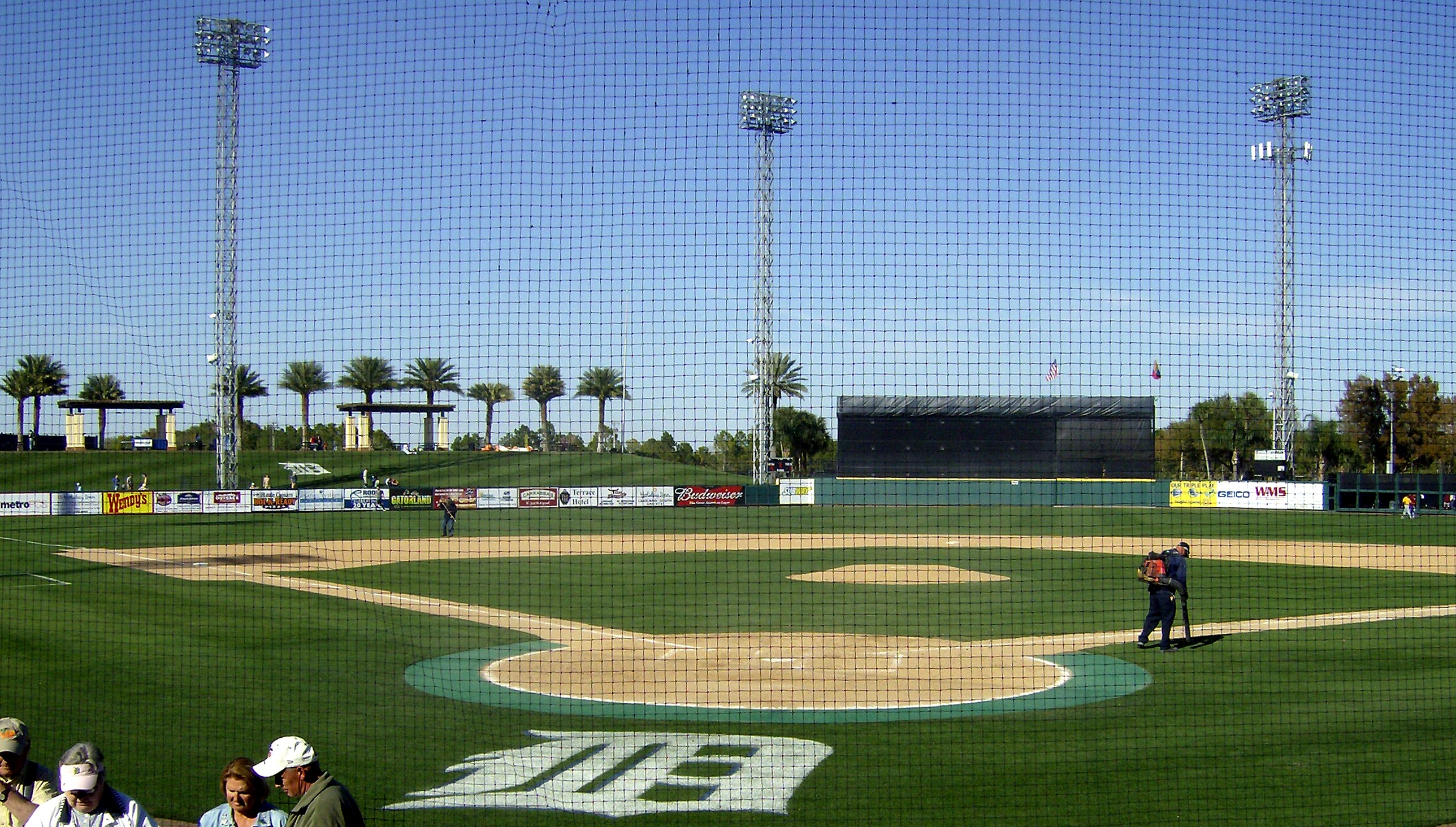
Joker Marchant Stadium (Tigers)

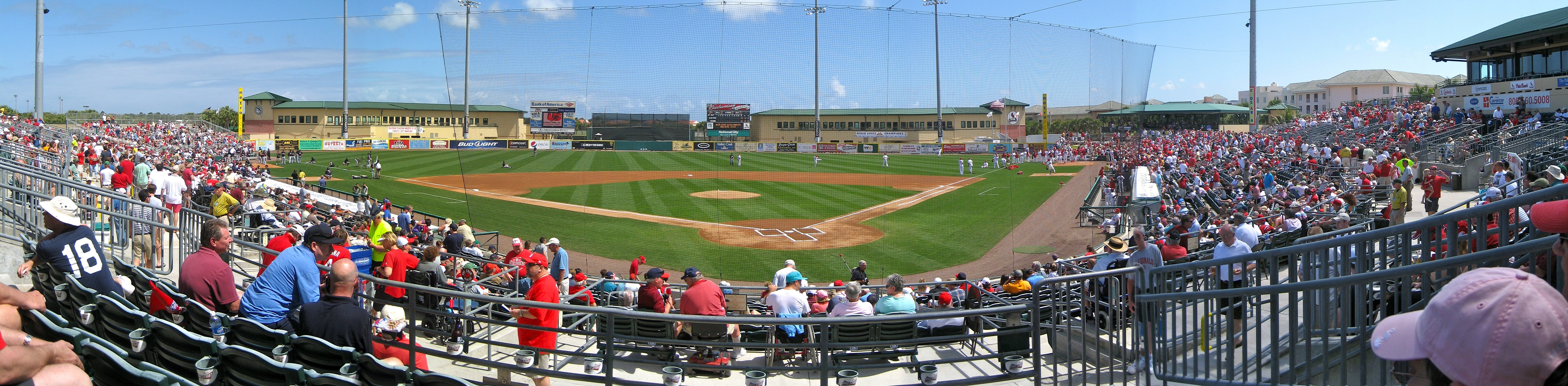
Roger Dean Stadium (Cardinals, Marlins)

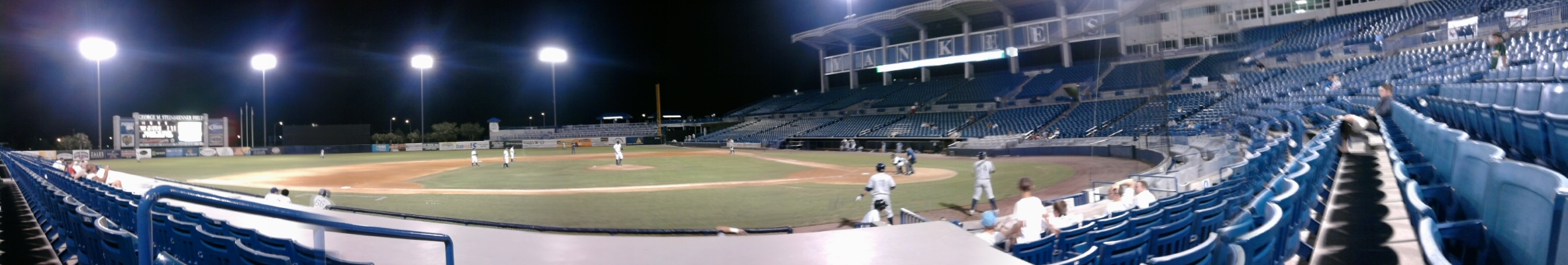
George M. Steinbrenner Field (Yankees)

== See also ==
- List of Major League Baseball stadiums
- List of Triple-A baseball stadiums
- List of Double-A baseball stadiums
- List of High-A baseball stadiums
- List of Single-A baseball stadiums
