= Carpenter Complex =

Baseball fields in Clearwater, Florida

- Interactive map of Carpenter Complex
- Full name: Paul Owens Training Facility at Carpenter Complex
- Former names: Carpenter Field
- Location: 651 Old Coachman Road; Clearwater, FL 33765; United States
- Coordinates: 27°58′18″N 82°43′54″W
- Capacity: 500
- Surface: grass
- Field size: Left – 340 ft. Left-Center – 370 ft. Center – 400 ft. Right-Center – 370 ft. Right – 340 ft.

Construction
- Groundbreaking: 1966
- Opened: March 5, 1967
- Renovated: 1987, 2009
- Cost: $250,000

Tenant
- Florida Complex League Phillies (FCL) (1984–present)

The Carpenter Complex is a complex of four baseball fields, training facilities, and offices in Clearwater, Florida. It opened as Carpenter Field in 1967. It is the Florida home of the Philadelphia Phillies baseball operations, spring training site for the Phillies’ minor league players, home to the Florida Complex League Phillies, and adjacent to BayCare Ballpark, spring training home of the Phillies and regular season home of the Clearwater Threshers. While the Complex is now adjacent to BayCare Ballpark, the Phillies, until 2004, played spring training games a short drive away, which gave the Complex its own identity in the Phillies organizational structure and the team's history.

The Complex has four fields, each named for Phillies Hall of Fame players (all of whom trained with the Phillies in Clearwater and also were the first four Phillies to have their uniform numbers retired), Rich Ashburn Field, Robin Roberts Field, Mike Schmidt Field, and Steve Carlton Field. In 2004, the Phillies officially renamed the Complex The Paul Owens Training Facility at Carpenter Complex, which honored Paul Owens' memory but also served to distinguish the training fields from the primary spring ballpark, BayCare Ballpark, which is also at Carpenter Complex.

== History and Expansion ==
The Phillies constructed Carpenter Field in 1966 and 1967 to accommodate its minor league spring training camp which had previously been split between camps at Leesburg, Florida and Plant City, Florida.

Carpenter Field was dedicated on March 5, 1967 where Clearwater mayor Joe Turner surprised Phillies owner and president Bob Carpenter by naming the field in his honor. The field was financed by a no-interest $250,000 loan from the Phillies to the City of Clearwater and repaid over 10-years.

The complex was built on the site of a former city trash dump. Through the years, settling garbage has left dips and holes in the field and required repairs to the clubhouse buildings.

During the 1987–1988 off-season, the City of Clearwater renovated the Complex along with Jack Russell Stadium in exchange for the Phillies' commitment to an additional eight years in Clearwater. Improvements included the additions of four covered batting tunnels, new lockers, and new fencing for all four fields.

During the summer of 2009, the Carpenter Complex was gutted and reconstructed with new offices, new locker rooms, a larger training room, and an elevated observation walkway that allows coaches and scouts to walk around to any of the three sections. The major league Phillies enjoyed these new renovations for the first time during Spring Training 2010.

In 2013, the Phillies opened a $4 million facility as the first indoor climate-controlled training center at a major-league spring-training site. It is used by the team year-round in Clearwater for training, rehabilitation, and daily workouts. On March 22, 2018, the Phillies honored the team's long time president David Montgomery, and renamed the indoor facility the "David P. Montgomery Baseball Performance Center".

== Teams ==
The Florida Complex League Phillies play their home games at the Complex.

Many Florida Winter Instructional League teams – both affiliated with and not affiliated with the Phillies – played their home games at the Complex at what was then called 'Carpenter Field' in the late 1960s and 1970s.

In December 2010, the Penn State Nittany Lions practiced at the complex prior to their appearance in the 2011 Outback Bowl at nearby Raymond James Stadium.

== Identification with Paul Owens ==
Paul Owens became identified with the Carpenter Complex due to his success with the franchise beginning with the opening of Carpenter Field in 1967. His death in 2003 resonated with those who worked with and under Owens at the Complex. In 1955, Owens was named the Olean Oilers's playing manager. The following year, Oleans became a Phillies' affiliate and Owens moved into their organization and he eventually became director of the Philadelphia farm system. On June 3, 1972, he replaced John Quinn as the Phillies' general manager and his farm system produced All-Stars Mike Schmidt, Greg Luzinski, Bob Boone, Larry Bowa, Oscar Gamble, and Dick Ruthven. He worked many hours at the Complex, sitting atop the fields, smoking cigarettes, and watching prospects. He remained with the Phillies as a senior adviser and special scout until his death, in 2003, at age 79.
