= List of Arizona Fall League stadiums =

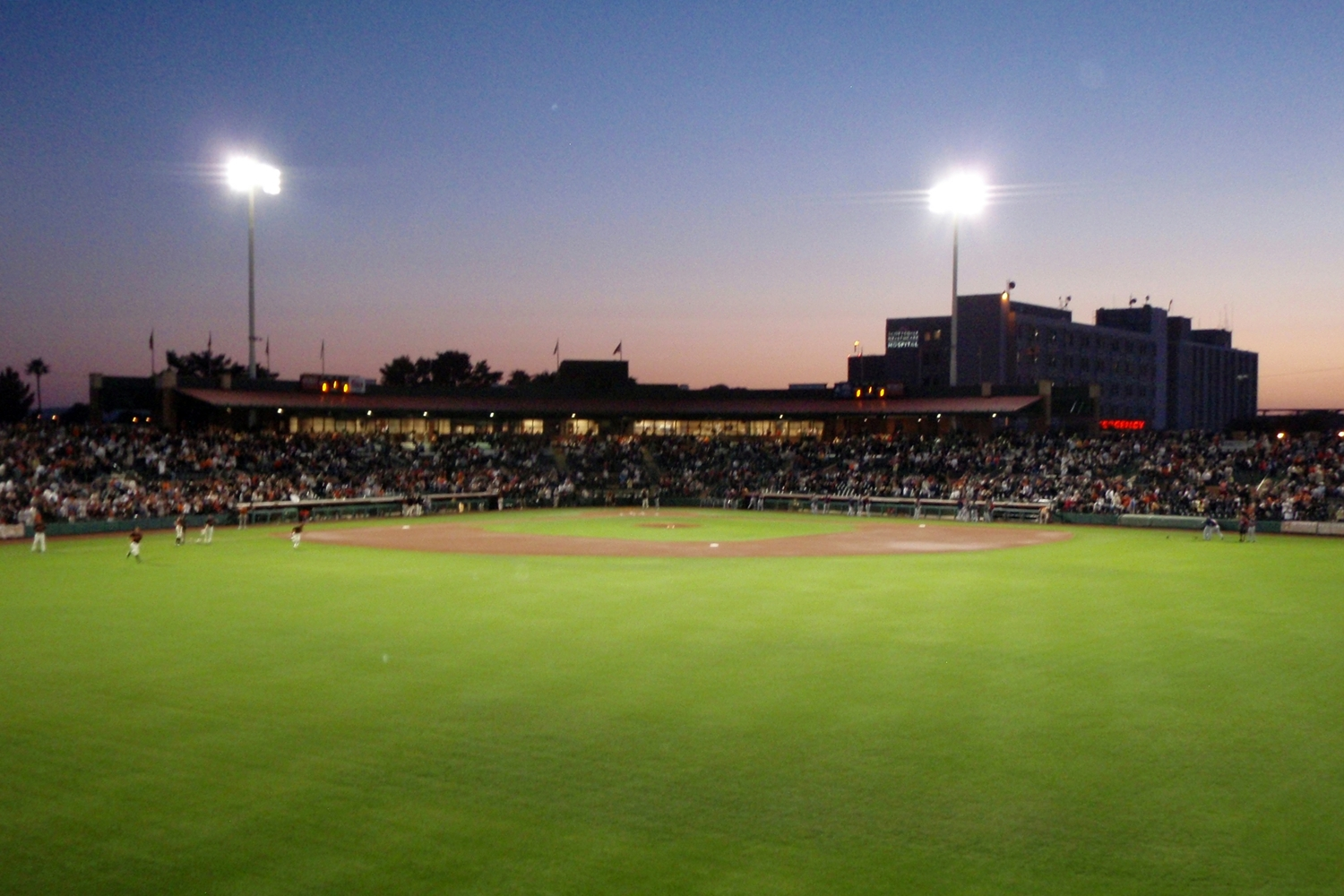
Scottsdale Stadium is the oldest stadium in the league and home of the Scottsdale Scorpions.

There are six stadiums in use by Arizona Fall League baseball teams, all located in Arizona. The oldest is Scottsdale Stadium (1992) in Scottsdale, home of the Scottsdale Scorpions. The newest stadium is Sloan Park (2014) in Mesa, the home field of the Mesa Solar Sox. Two stadiums were built in each of the 1990s, 2000s, and 2010s. The highest seating capacity is 15,000 at Sloan Park; the lowest capacity is 10,500 at Surprise Stadium, where the Surprise Saguaros play. All stadiums have a grass surface.

== Stadiums and Map ==
Arizona Fall League stadium locations

Name	Team(s)	Location	Opened	Capacity	Ref(s)
Camelback Ranch	Glendale Desert Dogs	Phoenix	2009	12,000	
Peoria Sports Complex	Peoria Javelinas	Peoria	1994	12,882	
Salt River Fields at Talking Stick	Salt River Rafters	Scottsdale	2011	11,000	
Scottsdale Stadium	Scottsdale Scorpions	Scottsdale	1992	12,000	
Sloan Park	Mesa Solar Sox	Mesa	2014	15,000	
Surprise Stadium	Surprise Saguaros	Surprise	2003	10,500	

== Gallery ==
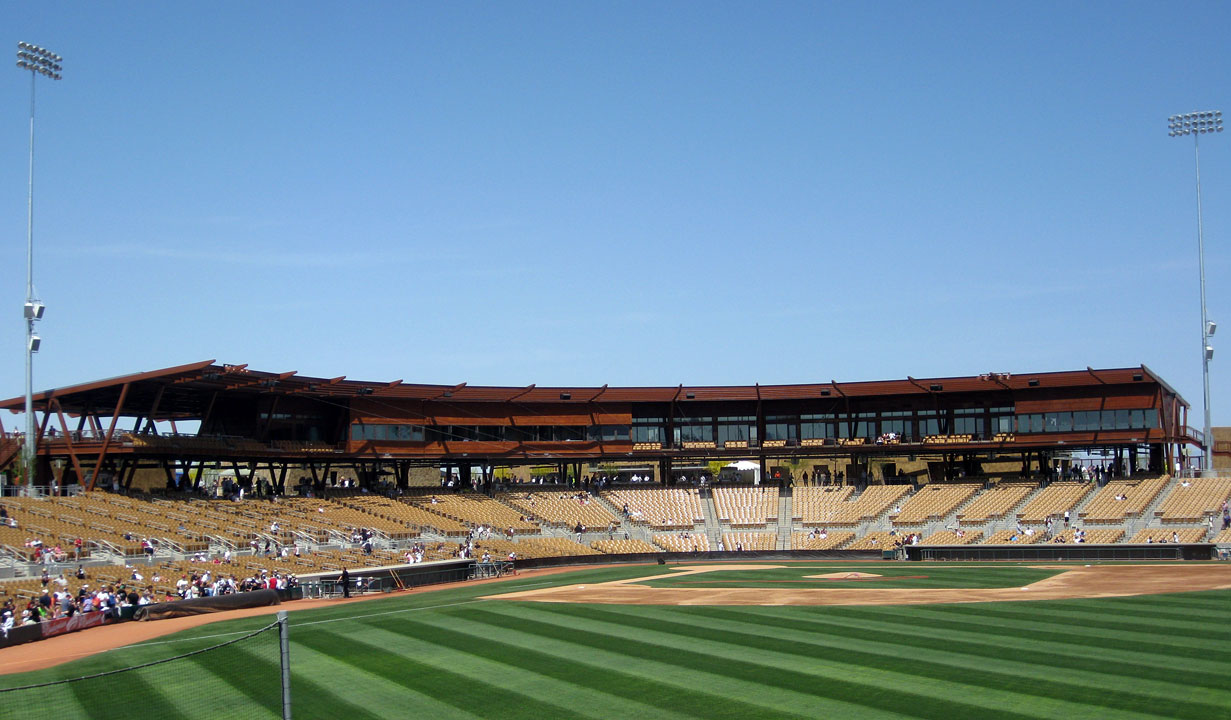
Camelback Ranch (Glendale Desert Dogs)

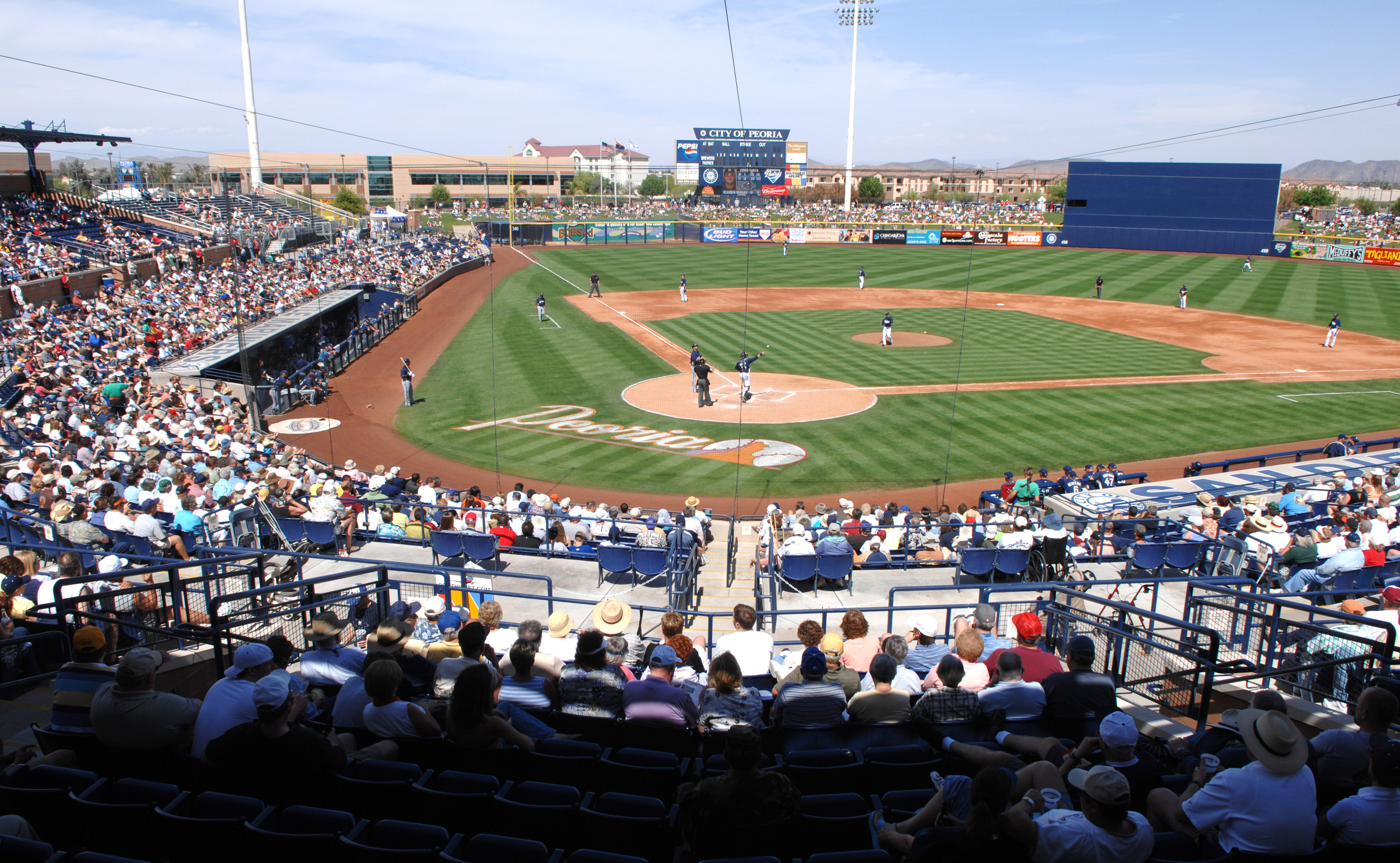
Peoria Sports Complex (Peoria Javelinas)

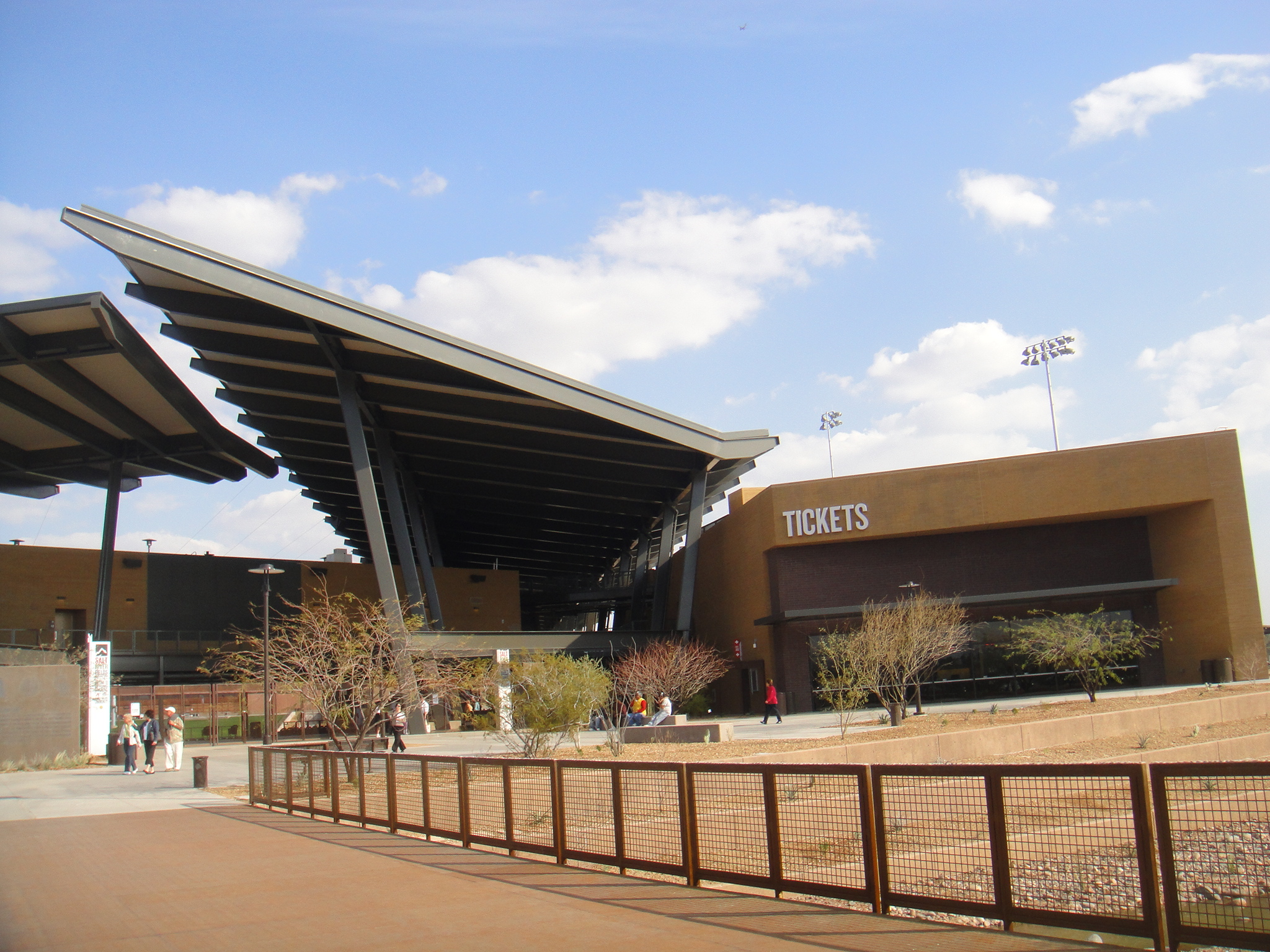
Salt River Fields at Talking Stick (Salt River Rafters)

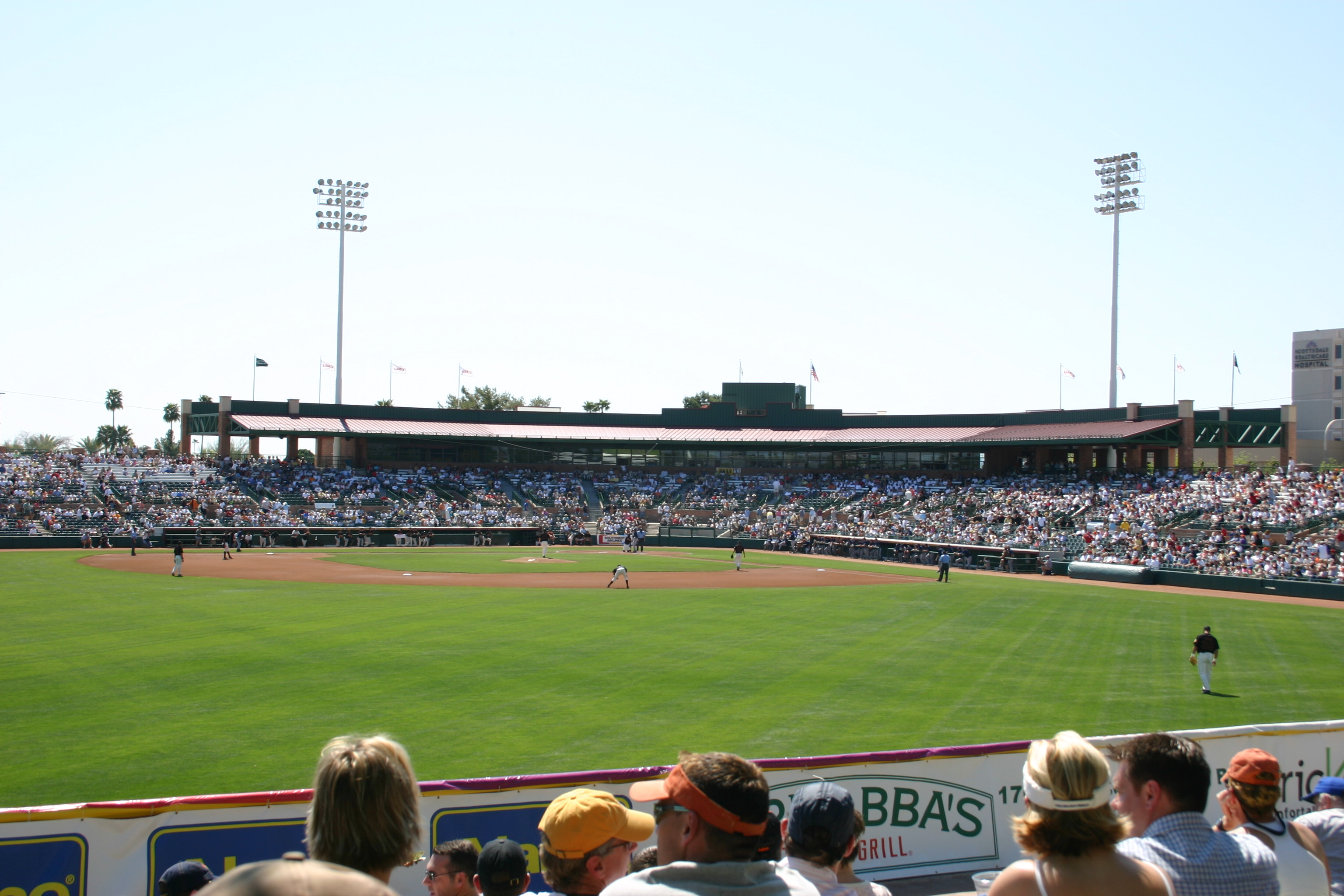
Scottsdale Stadium (Scottsdale Scorpions)

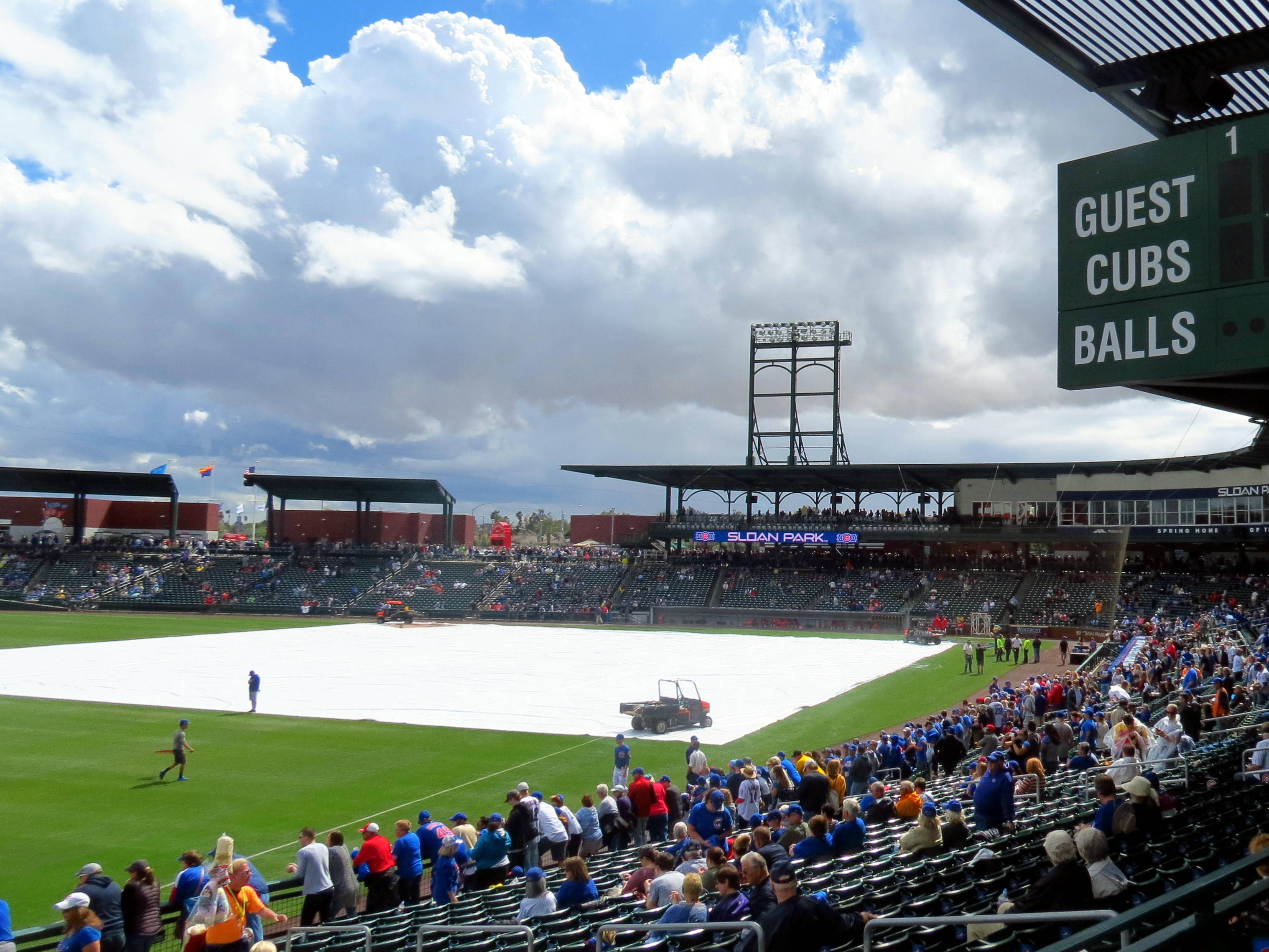
Sloan Park (Mesa Solar Sox)

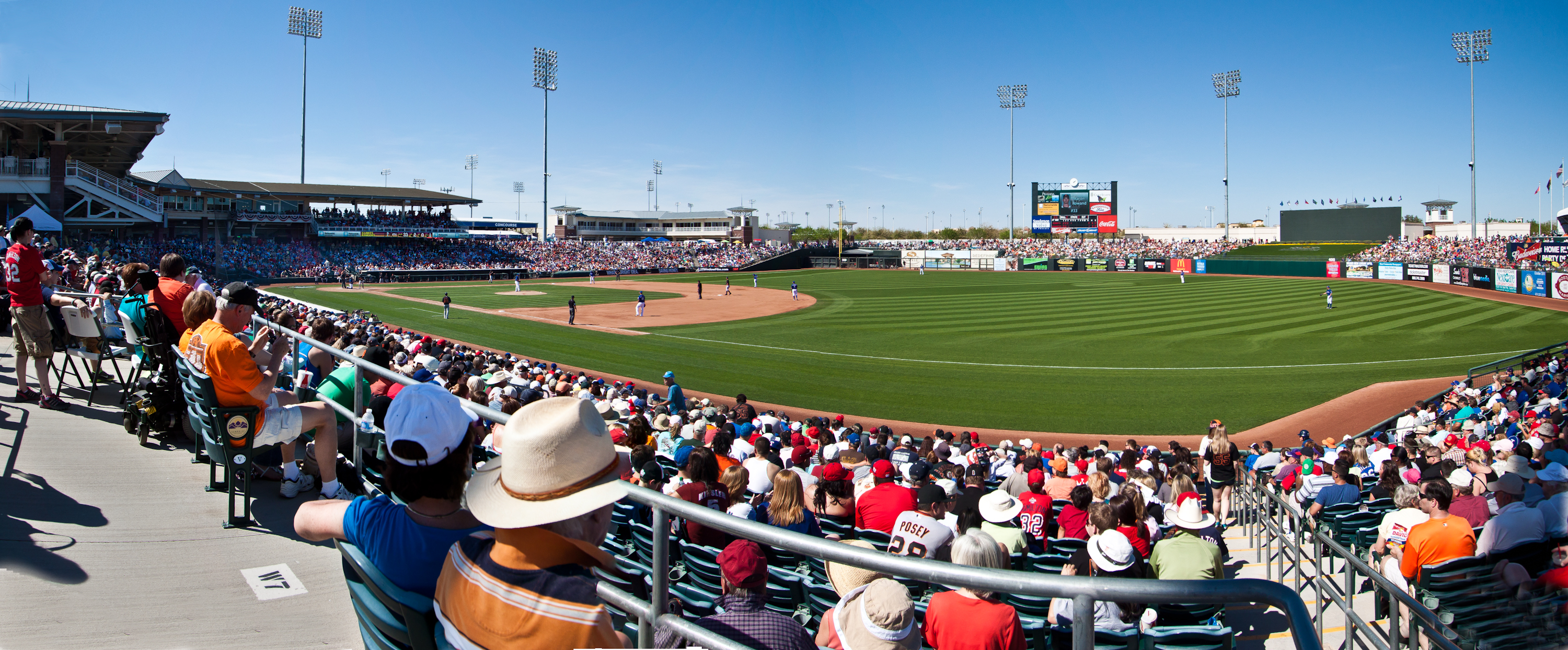
Surprise Stadium (Surprise Saguaros)

== See also ==
- List of Rookie baseball stadiums
