= Arizona Fall League =

Off-season baseball league in the United States

- Sport: Baseball
- Founded: 1992
- No. of teams: 6
- Country: United States
- Most recent champion: Peoria Javelinas (2026)
- Most titles: Peoria Javelinas (8)
- Website: www.mlb.com/arizona-fall-league

The Arizona Fall League (AFL) (Note: Some websites, such as Baseball-Reference.com, use an abbreviation of AZFL.) is an off-season baseball league owned and operated by Major League Baseball (MLB) which operates during autumn in Arizona, United States, at six different baseball complexes. Arizona Fall League rosters are filled by many of the top prospects in Minor League Baseball (MiLB) who are assigned by their parent clubs.

== Structure ==
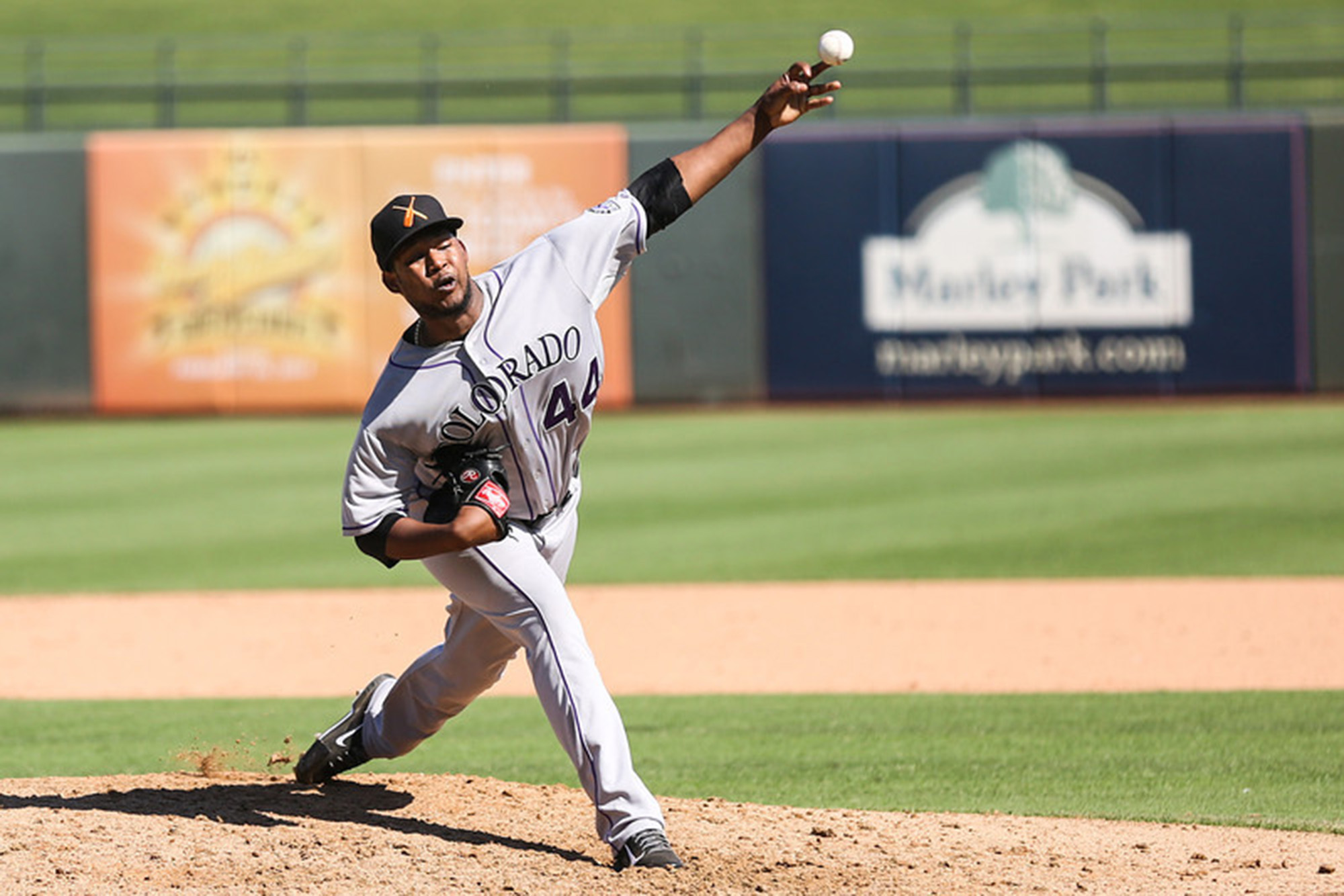
Jayson Aquino with the Salt River Rafters in 2014 while a member of the Colorado Rockies organization; he made his major league debut with the Baltimore Orioles in 2016

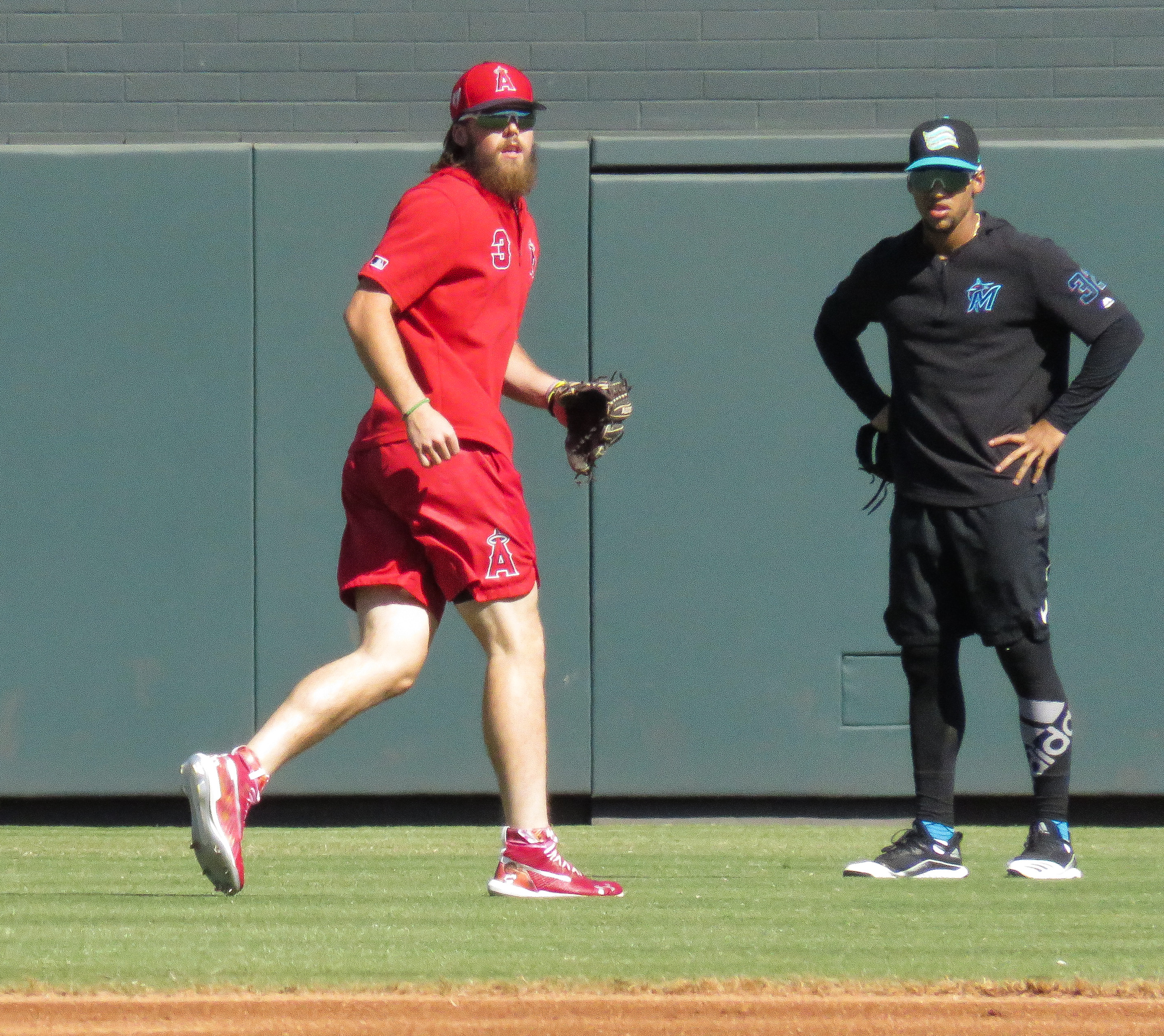
Brandon Marsh (left) and Víctor Víctor Mesa prior to the 2019 Fall Stars Game

The six teams of the AFL are organized in two three-team divisions. Each AFL team is affiliated with five teams in Major League Baseball (MLB), and each MLB team provides seven players from their Minor League Baseball affiliates, yielding 35-man rosters. Specific players are invited (not assigned) to play in the AFL by their parent club. The league provides an environment for top prospects to advance their development, in a setting that MLB governs and monitors, as opposed to other offseason leagues (such as the Puerto Rican Winter League) located outside of the contiguous United States.

Player eligibility has changed over time; as of 2008, each MLB organization could only provide one player below the Double-A level, and before 2019 there were service-time limits for any players on the 40-man roster of an MLB team, but as of 2021 all players within an MLB organization are eligible. Free agents are not eligible. The seven players each MLB organization provides consist of four pitchers and three position players. Positional needs for each AFL team (e.g. catchers) are coordinated between player development directors of the affiliated MLB organizations via a "position draft". An MLB organization can assign more than three position players; such players serve as a taxi squad for the AFL team and are limited to playing two games each week.

Play generally begins in early October (10/7 for 2024) and runs until mid-November, although play continued into early December for the first five seasons that the league operated. Each team plays approximately 30 games; schedule length has varied somewhat during the league's history. Following the end of the league's regular season, the two division winners meet in a championship game.

Players wear uniforms of their respective MLB parent club, along with an AFL team-specific hat. The league had its own team-specific uniforms before 1998 and in 2019. The manager, pitching coach, and hitting coach of each AFL team are provided by MLB organizations on a rotating basis.

Each team plays home games at its own ballpark, each of which currently has a seating capacity in excess of 10,000 spectators. For the 2019 season, only four venues were used due to ballpark renovation work.

The league has organized an annual all-star game since 2006. Initially known as the "Rising Stars Showcase", it has been branded as the "Fall Stars Game" since at least 2013. Included in the 2022 season was the Homerun derby. Players for the game are selected by league staff, scouting and farm directors, and MLB.com writers.

== History ==
The league's inaugural season was 1992, during which each team played a 54-game schedule that ended in early December. The divisions and teams that season were:

- Northern division: Grand Canyon Rafters, Scottsdale Scorpions, Sun Cities Solar Sox
- Southern division: Chandler Diamondbacks, Phoenix Saguaros, Tucson Javelinas

The league's first game was played on October 6, 1992, with the Grand Canyon Rafters defeating the Scottsdale Scorpions, 6–4.

Before the 1994 season, the Javelinas relocated from Tucson to Peoria, to limit travel distances to the Phoenix metropolitan area. All teams have been located in greater Phoenix since then.

Since 1995, when the Diamondbacks became the Desert Dogs, no team has changed its nickname. However, each team has changed its location at least once during its history. The most recent change was by the Desert Dogs, who moved from Phoenix to Glendale in 2013.

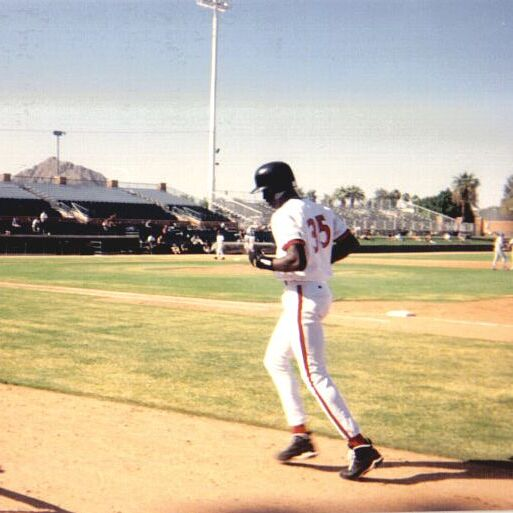
Michael Jordan during his time with the Scottsdale Scorpions

For the 1998 season, organizers rostered players onto each Arizona Fall League team from a single division in MLB:

- American League East – Grand Canyon Rafters
- American League Central – Phoenix Desert Dogs
- American League West – Peoria Javelinas
- National League East – Sun Cities Solar Sox
- National League Central – Maryvale Saguaros
- National League West – Scottsdale Scorpions

In 2007, the United States national baseball team and China national baseball team played several games against AFL teams; both teams were later competitors in baseball at the 2008 Summer Olympics. In 2019, the Mesa Solar Sox participated in the Vamos a Tucson Mexican Baseball Fiesta in early October, facing teams of the Mexican Pacific League.

In 2019, the league adopted a new logo. In 2020, the season was cancelled due to the COVID-19 pandemic.

A number of future MLB All-Stars have had stints in the Arizona Fall League; over 300, per the league's website. These include David Wright (2003), Dustin Pedroia (2004), Andre Ethier (2005), Bryce Harper (2010–2011), Nolan Arenado (2011), Mike Trout (2011), Mookie Betts (2013), Aaron Judge (2014), Gleyber Torres (2016), and Ronald Acuña Jr. (2017). In 1994, Michael Jordan played for Scottsdale during his time away from the NBA. Similarly, former NFL quarterback Tim Tebow played for Scottsdale in 2016 during his foray into professional baseball.

== Current teams ==
Current team locations:
(Maricopa County, Arizona shown)

Each stadium hosts one or two of its MLB affiliates, denoted in bold, during spring training.

Each listed city is in Arizona. Team affiliations reflect the 2026 season.

Team	MLB affiliates	City	Stadium	Capacity
Glendale Desert Dogs	Atlanta Braves; **Chicago White Sox**; **Los Angeles Dodgers**; Miami Marlins; Pittsburgh Pirates	Glendale	Camelback Ranch	10,300
Mesa Solar Sox	Athletics; Boston Red Sox; **Chicago Cubs**; Los Angeles Angels; Toronto Blue Jays	Mesa	Sloan Park	15,000
Peoria Javelinas	Baltimore Orioles; Cincinnati Reds; St. Louis Cardinals; **San Diego Padres**; **Seattle Mariners**	Peoria	Peoria Sports Complex	10,714
Salt River Rafters	**Arizona Diamondbacks**; **Colorado Rockies**; Minnesota Twins; New York Yankees; Washington Nationals	Scottsdale	Salt River Fields at Talking Stick	11,000
Scottsdale Scorpions	Detroit Tigers; Houston Astros; Milwaukee Brewers; **San Francisco Giants**; Tampa Bay Rays	Scottsdale	Scottsdale Stadium	11,200
Surprise Saguaros	Cleveland Guardians; **Kansas City Royals**; New York Mets; Philadelphia Phillies; **Texas Rangers**	Surprise	Surprise Stadium	11,000

== Results by season ==
Results for each team since the league's inaugural 1992 season are listed below. Teams are listed by their nicknames only, independent of location, as various team locations have changed over time. Tie games are not listed, as they are excluded from winning percentage calculations, which determine division standings. The best winning percentage for a season was by the Saguaros who went 26–10 (.722) in 2011, while the worst was by the Saguaros in 2002 with a record of 11–32 (.256).

Through 1997, teams were organized into Northern and Southern divisions. For the 1998 season, American and National divisions were designated. From 1999 to 2021, the divisions were named East and West, except for four seasons (2003–2005 and 2008) when American and National naming was again used.

As of the 2022 season, divisions have been eliminated. The top three teams in the final regular season standings qualify for the postseason. The second- and third-place teams meet in a play-in semi-final game, with the winner facing the first-place team in the championship game.

Division winners appear in bold type from 1992 to 2021; beginning with 2022, the top three teams that qualify for the postseason appear in bold type. Tie-breaking procedures (such as between the Saguaros and Javelinas in 2021 for the West division title) are unclear.

Year	Desert Dogs (Note: The Desert Dogs were known as the Diamondbacks during 1992–1994.)		Javelinas		Rafters		Saguaros		Scorpions		Solar Sox		Ref.
Year	Record	Finish	Record	Finish	Record	Finish	Record	Finish	Record	Finish	Record	Finish	Ref.
1992	20–33 (.377)	3rd South	25–26 (.490)	2nd South	26–27 (.491)	2nd North	33–18 (.647)	**1st South**	25–28 (.472)	3rd North	28–25 (.528)	**1st North**	
1993	28–21 (.571)	2nd South	32–17 (.653)	**1st South**	26–22 (.542)	**1st North**	17–32 (.347)	3rd South	22–27 (.449)	2nd North	21–27 (.438)	3rd North	
1994	20–30 (.400)	2nd South	32–19 (.627)	**1st North**	19–31 (.380)	3rd South	32–18 (.640)	**1st South**	26–25 (.510)	2nd North	22–28 (.440)	3rd North	
1995	23–28 (.451)	2nd South	28–23 (.549)	2nd North	22–28 (.440)	3rd South	33–18 (.647)	**1st South**	16–34 (.320)	3rd North	30–21 (.588)	**1st North**	
1996	26–25 (.510)	2nd South	25–26 (.490)	2nd North	22–29 (.431)	3rd South	27–24 (.529)	**1st South**	29–22 (.569)	**1st North**	25–26 (.490)	3rd North	
1997	21–24 (.467)	2nd South	28–17 (.622)	**1st North**	29–16 (.644)	**1st South**	15–30 (.333)	3rd South	20–25 (.444)	3rd North	22–23 (.489)	2nd North	
1998	21–22 (.488)	3rd AL	23–21 (.523)	2nd AL	26–18 (.591)	**1st AL**	19–25 (.432)	3rd NL	20–23 (.465)	2nd NL	22–22 (.500)	**1st NL**	
1999	25–19 (.568)	2nd East	17–27 (.386)	3rd West	17–27 (.386)	2nd West	17–27 (.386)	**1st West**	25–19 (.568)	3rd East	31–13 (.705)	**1st East**	
2000	25–16 (.610)	**1st East**	19–22 (.463)	2nd West	20–21 (.488)	**1st West**	19–22 (.463)	3rd West	25–16 (.610)	2nd East	14–26 (.350)	3rd East	
2001	25–16 (.610)	**1st East**	21–10 (.677)	2nd West	26–15 (.634)	**1st West**	12–29 (.293)	3rd West	22–19 (.537)	2nd East	17–24 (.415)	3rd East	
2002	25–19 (.568)	2nd East	26–17 (.605)	**1st West**	20–23 (.465)	2nd West	11–32 (.256)	3rd West	29–15 (.659)	**1st East**	19–24 (.442)	3rd East	
2003	18–13 (.581)	**1st NL**	9–22 (.290)	3rd NL	13–18 (.419)	2nd NL	17–16 (.515)	3rd AL	16–15 (.516)	2nd AL	20–13 (.606)	**1st AL**	
2004	21–15 (.583)	**1st NL**	16–21 (.432)	2nd NL	18–17 (.514)	3rd NL	17–17 (.500)	2nd AL	21–15 (.583)	**1st AL**	14–22 (.389)	3rd AL	
2005	22–10 (.688)	**1st NL**	17–14 (.548)	2nd NL	16–16 (.500)	3rd NL	8–23 (.258)	3rd AL	17–15 (.531)	**1st AL**	15–17 (.469)	2nd AL	
2006	20–11 (.645)	**1st East**	14–18 (.438)	3rd West	16–16 (.500)	**1st West**	15–17 (.469)	2nd West	15–17 (.469)	3rd East	15–16 (.484)	2nd East	
2007	20–11 (.645)	**1st East**	17–15 (.531)	2nd West	19–13 (.594)	**1st West**	10–22 (.313)	3rd West	16–16 (.500)	2nd East	14–17 (.452)	3rd East	
2008	18–18 (.500)	**1st NL**	16–22 (.421)	2nd NL	12–26 (.316)	3rd NL	26–12 (.684)	2nd AL	14–22 (.389)	3rd AL	26–12 (.684)	**1st AL**	
2009	19–13 (.594)	**1st East**	18–14 (.563)	**1st West**	16–16 (.500)	2nd West	14–18 (.438)	3rd West	15–16 (.484)	2nd East	13–18 (.419)	3rd East	
2010	11–17 (.393)	3rd East	20–10 (.667)	**1st West**	17–12 (.586)	2nd West	9–22 (.290)	3rd West	20–12 (.625)	**1st East**	13–17 (.433)	2nd East	
2011	14–22 (.389)	3rd West	16–19 (.457)	2nd West	22–16 (.579)	**1st East**	26–10 (.722)	**1st West**	14–22 (.389)	3rd East	17–20 (.459)	2nd East	
2012	13–15 (.464)	3rd West	19–13 (.594)	**1st West**	17–13 (.567)	**1st East**	17–14 (.548)	2nd West	15–16 (.484)	2nd East	10–20 (.333)	3rd East	
2013	13–16 (.448)	2nd West	12–19 (.387)	3rd West	19–12 (.613)	2nd East	18–12 (.600)	**1st West**	10–21 (.323)	3rd East	19–11 (.633)	**1st East**	
2014	14–15 (.483)	3rd West	15–14 (.517)	**1st West**	17–11 (.607)	**1st East**	16–15 (.516)	2nd West	12–20 (.375)	3rd East	15–14 (.517)	2nd East	
2015	13–15 (.464)	2nd West	12–15 (.444)	3rd West	16–13 (.552)	2nd East	19–11 (.633)	**1st West**	18–12 (.600)	**1st East**	9–21 (.300)	3rd East	
2016	17–15 (.531)	2nd West	14–15 (.483)	3rd West	15–15 (.500)	2nd East	17–14 (.548)	**1st West**	13–18 (.419)	3rd East	16–15 (.516)	**1st East**	
2017	16–14 (.533)	2nd West	18–12 (.600)	**1st West**	13–15 (.464)	2nd East	13–17 (.433)	3rd West	12–17 (.414)	3rd East	16–13 (.552)	**1st East**	
2018	12–18 (.400)	2nd West	21–9 (.700)	**1st West**	16–14 (.533)	**1st East**	11–19 (.367)	3rd West	14–15 (.483)	3rd East	15–14 (.517)	2nd East	
2019	14–15 (.483)	2nd West	14–15 (.483)	3rd West	17–11 (.607)	**1st East**	17–12 (.586)	**1st West**	12–17 (.414)	3rd East	15–13 (.536)	2nd East	
2021	17–13 (.567)	3rd West	17–12 (.586)	2nd West	10–20 (.333)	3rd East	17–12 (.586)	**1st West**	12–18 (.400)	2nd East	15–13 (.536)	**1st East**	
2022	15–13 (.536)	**2nd**	14–14 (.500)	**3rd**	12–18 (.400)	6th	19–10 (.655)	**1st**	13–16 (.448)	5th	13–15 (.464)	4th	
2023	12–18 (.400)	6th	15–14 (.517)	2nd	14–16 (.467)	5th	19–11 (.633)	**1st**	15–14 (.517)	3rd	14–16 (.467)	4th	
2024	16–14 (.533)	4th	8–20 (.286)	6th	16–14 (.533)	**1st**	18–10 (.643)	2nd	16–14 (.533)	3rd	14–16 (.467)	5th	
2025	11–16 (.407)	5th	12–15 (.444)	2nd	11–17 (.393)	6th	16–10 (.615)	**1st**	18–10 (.643)	3rd	14–14 (.500)	4th	
2026	10–17 (.370)	4th	17–11 (.607)	**1st**	14–15 (.483)	3rd	18–10 (.643)	2nd	13–15 (.464)	5th	11–15 (.423)	6th	

== Championship history ==
From 1992 to 2021, the first-place teams from both divisions met for the league championship. Originally a best-of-three series, it was played as a single game from 2001 to 2021.

As of the 2022 season, divisions have been eliminated. The top three teams in the final regular season standings qualify for the postseason. The second- and third-place teams meet in a play-in semi-final game, with the winner facing the first-place team in the championship game.

For the 2025 season due to weather concerns, the league went to a play-in style tournament with the top two teams from the regular season receiving a bye, the number six seed played against the number three seed, number five seed playing the number four seed. The winner of the three/six matchup would play the number two seed and the four/five matchup would play the number one seed.

The Peoria Javelinas have won the most championships, seven. The most consecutive championships is five, accomplished by the Phoenix Desert Dogs during 2004–2008. No championship game was held in 2020, as the season was canceled due to the COVID-19 pandemic.

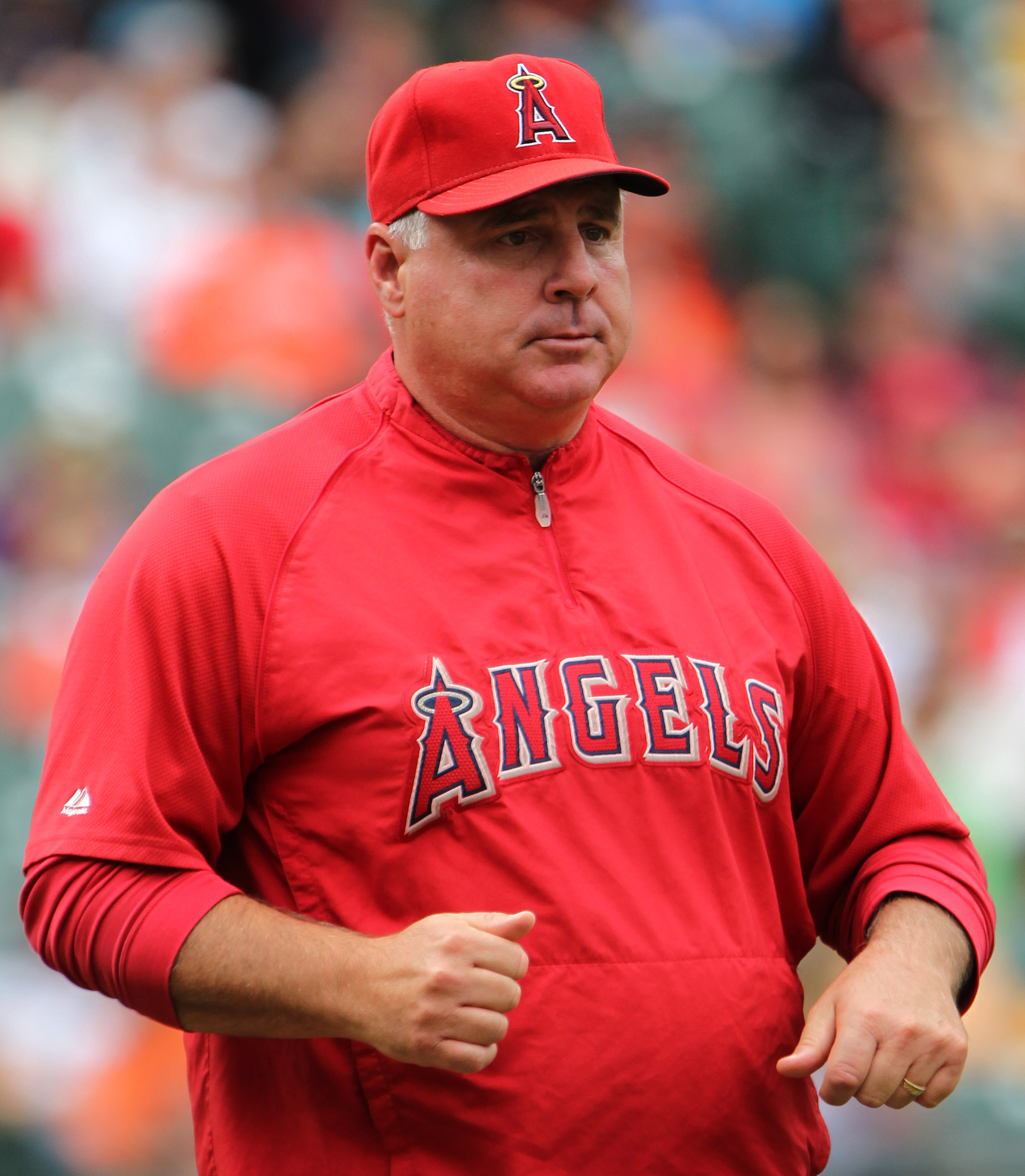
Mike Scioscia was manager of the 1997 champion Peoria Javelinas.

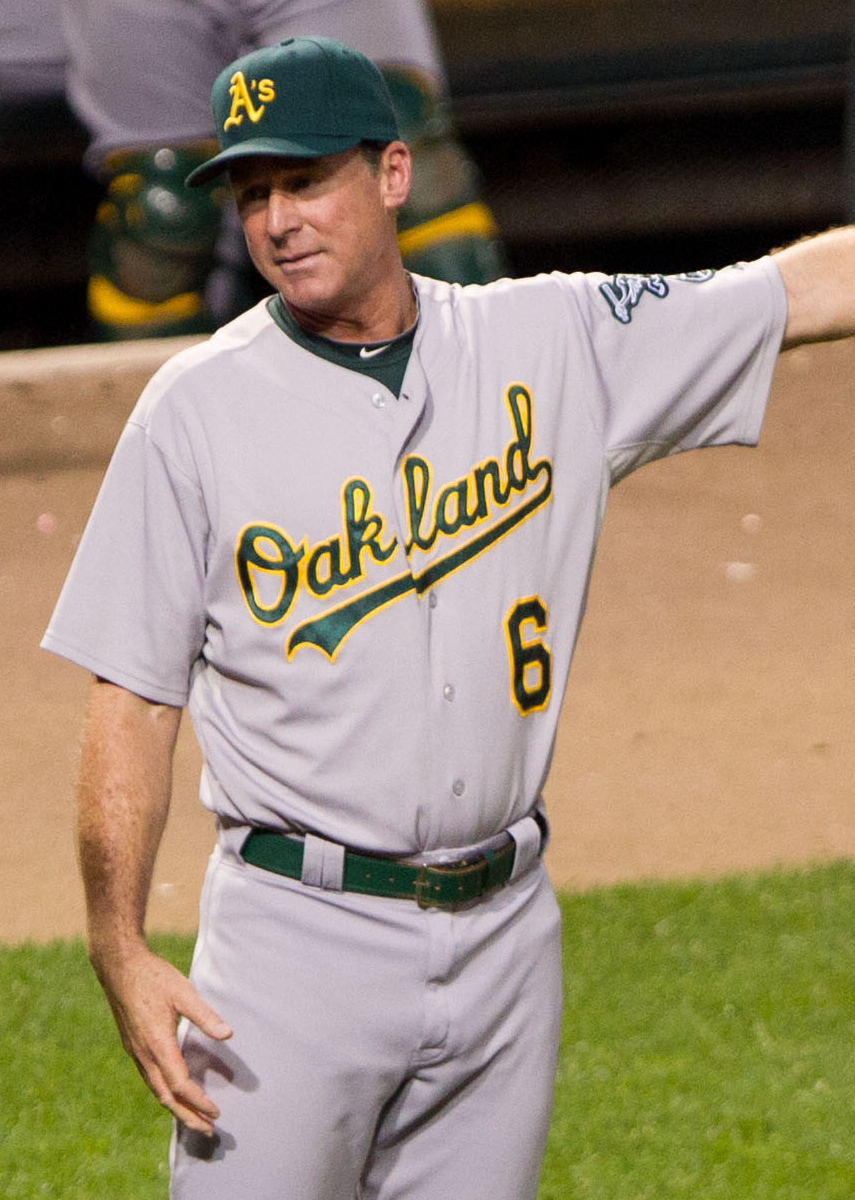
Bob Melvin was manager of the 1999 runner-up Maryvale Saguaros.

Season	Game date	Champion	Score	Runner-Up	Ref.
1992	December 7–9	Sun Cities Solar Sox	2–1 (games)	Phoenix Saguaros	
1993	December 3–5	Tempe Rafters	2–1 (games)	Tucson Javelinas	
1994	December 2–3	Peoria Javelinas	2–0 (games)	Mesa Saguaros	
1995	December 1–3	Mesa Saguaros	2–1 (games)	Sun Cities Solar Sox	
1996	December 7–8	Scottsdale Scorpions	2–0 (games)	Mesa Saguaros	
1997	November 21–23	Peoria Javelinas	2–1 (games)	Grand Canyon Rafters	
1998	November 20–21	Sun Cities Solar Sox	2–0 (games)	Grand Canyon Rafters	
1999	November 19–20	Mesa Solar Sox	2–0 (games)	Maryvale Saguaros	
2000	November 17–18	Grand Canyon Rafters	2–0 (games)	Phoenix Desert Dogs	
2001	November 17	Phoenix Desert Dogs	12–8	Grand Canyon Rafters	
2002	November 23	Peoria Javelinas	7–1	Scottsdale Scorpions	
2003	November 15	Mesa Solar Sox	7–2	Mesa Desert Dogs	
2004	November 20	Phoenix Desert Dogs	6–2	Scottsdale Scorpions	
2005	November 12	Phoenix Desert Dogs	9–3	Surprise Scorpions	
2006	November 18	Phoenix Desert Dogs	6–2	Grand Canyon Rafters	
2007	November 17	Phoenix Desert Dogs	7–2	Surprise Rafters	
2008	November 22	Phoenix Desert Dogs	10–4	Mesa Solar Sox	
2009	November 21	Peoria Javelinas	5–4	Phoenix Desert Dogs	
2010	November 20	Scottsdale Scorpions	3–2	Peoria Javelinas	
2011	November 19	Salt River Rafters	9–3	Surprise Saguaros	
2012	November 17	Peoria Javelinas	4–3	Salt River Rafters	
2013	November 16	Surprise Saguaros	2–0	Mesa Solar Sox	
2014	November 15	Salt River Rafters	14–7	Peoria Javelinas	
2015	November 21	Scottsdale Scorpions	6–4	Surprise Saguaros	
2016	November 19	Mesa Solar Sox	6–1	Surprise Saguaros	
2017	November 18	Peoria Javelinas	8–2	Mesa Solar Sox	
2018	November 17	Peoria Javelinas	3–2 (10)	Salt River Rafters	
2019	October 26 (Note: The 2019 season started in mid-September and ended in late October.)	Salt River Rafters	5–1	Surprise Saguaros	
2020	None (season cancelled due to the COVID-19 pandemic)				
2021	November 20	Mesa Solar Sox	6–0	Surprise Saguaros	
2022	November 12	Surprise Saguaros	7–6	Glendale Desert Dogs	
2023	November 11	Surprise Saguaros	6–5	Peoria Javelinas	
2024	November 16	Salt River Rafters	3–2	Surprise Saguaros	
2025	November 14	Surprise Saguaros	9–4	Peoria Javelinas	
2026	November 14	Peoria Javelinas	8–3	Surprise Saguaros	

=== Appearances by team ===
Appearances	Team	Wins	Losses	Win pct.	Seasons
16	Surprise Saguaros	5	11	.313	1992, 1994, **1995**, 1996, 1999, 2011, **2013**, 2015, 2016, 2019, 2021, **2022**, **2023**, 2024, **2025**, 2026
13	Peoria Javelinas	8	5	.615	1993, **1994**, **1997**, **2002**, **2009**, 2010, **2012**, 2014, **2017**, **2018,** 2023, 2025, **2026**
13	Salt River Rafters	6	7	.462	**1993**, 1997, 1998, **2000**, 2001, 2006, 2007, **2011**, 2012, **2014**, 2018, **2019, 2024**
10	Mesa Solar Sox	6	4	.600	**1992**, 1995, **1998**, **1999**, **2003**, 2008, 2013, **2016**, 2017, **2021**
9	Glendale Desert Dogs	6	3	.667	2000, **2001**, 2003, **2004**, **2005**, **2006**, **2007**, **2008**, 2009
6	Scottsdale Scorpions	3	3	.500	**1996**, 2002, 2004, 2005, **2010**, **2015**

Notes:

- In the Seasons column, **bold** type indicates a championship
- Each current team has appeared under at least one former name:
  - Glendale Desert Dogs made eight appearances as the Phoenix Desert Dogs and one as the Mesa Desert Dogs
  - Mesa Solar Sox made three appearances as the Sun Cities Solar Sox
  - Peoria Javelinas made one appearance as the Tucson Javelinas
  - Salt River Rafters made five appearances as the Grand Canyon Rafters and one each as the Tempe Rafters and Surprise Rafters
  - Scottsdale Scorpions made one appearance as the Surprise Scorpions
  - Surprise Saguaros made three appearances as the Mesa Saguaros and one each as the Phoenix Saguaros and Maryvale Saguaros

== Awards ==
=== Most Valuable Player award ===
First presented in 2002 and named for Joe Black of the Brooklyn Dodgers, the award honors the 1952 National League Rookie of the Year.

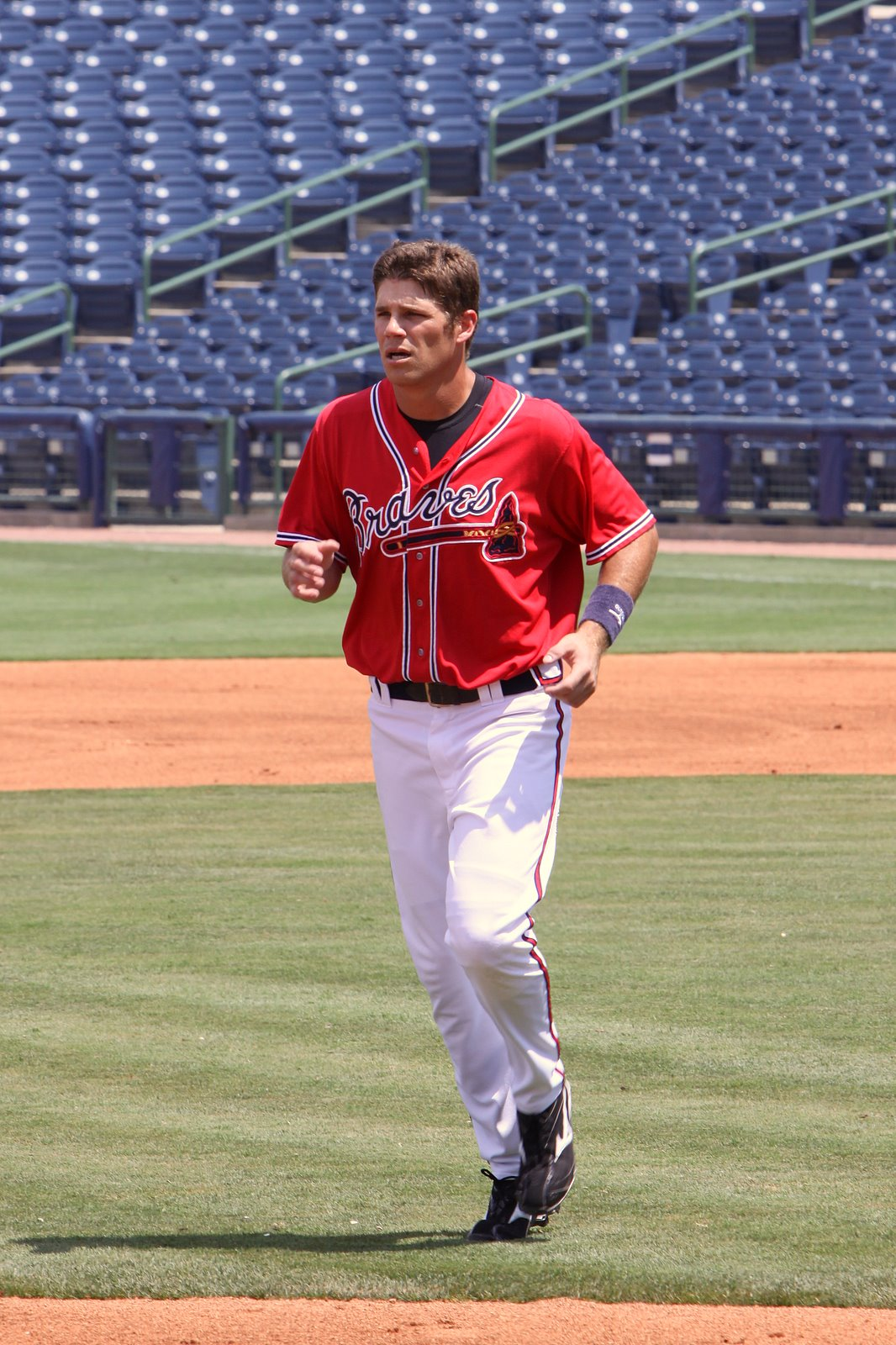
Eric Duncan was league MVP in 2005.

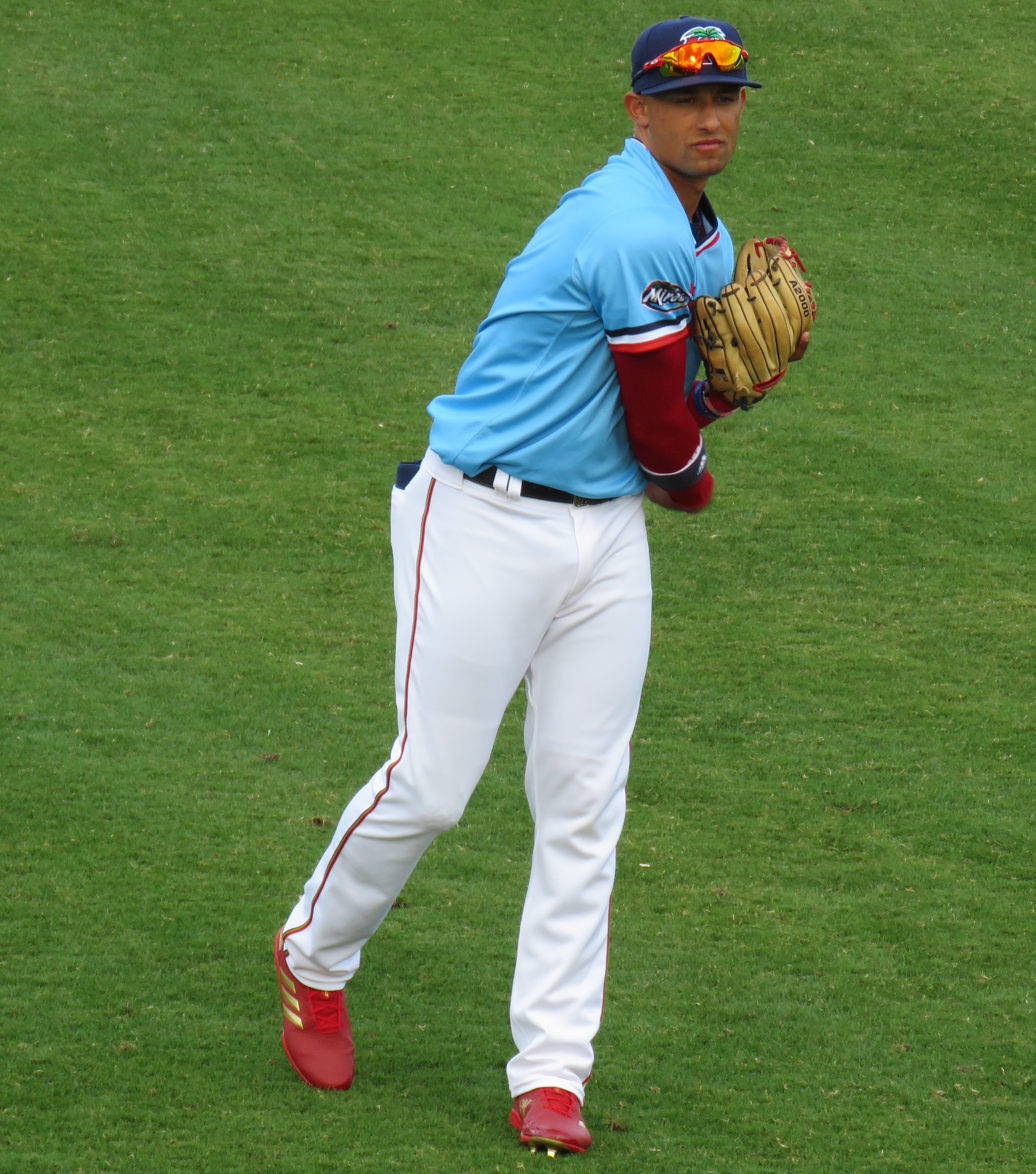
Royce Lewis was league MVP in 2019.

Joe Black MVP Award winners
Year	Player	Organization	Position	Team	Ref
2002	Ken Harvey	Kansas City Royals	1B	Scottsdale Scorpions	
2003	Jason Dubois	Chicago Cubs	OF	Mesa Solar Sox	
2004	Chris Shelton	Detroit Tigers	DH	Grand Canyon Rafters	
2005	Eric Duncan	New York Yankees	3B	Grand Canyon Rafters	
2006	Chip Cannon	Toronto Blue Jays	1B	Phoenix Desert Dogs	
2007	Sam Fuld	Chicago Cubs	OF	Mesa Solar Sox	
2008	Tommy Hanson	Atlanta Braves	P	Mesa Solar Sox	
2009	Grant Desme	Oakland Athletics	OF	Phoenix Desert Dogs	
2010	Dustin Ackley	Seattle Mariners	2B	Peoria Javelinas	
2011	Nolan Arenado	Colorado Rockies	3B	Salt River Rafters	
2012	Chris McGuiness	Texas Rangers	1B	Surprise Saguaros	
2013	Kris Bryant	Chicago Cubs	3B	Mesa Solar Sox	
2014	Greg Bird	New York Yankees	1B	Scottsdale Scorpions	
2015	Adam Engel	Chicago White Sox	OF	Glendale Desert Dogs	
2016	Gleyber Torres	New York Yankees	SS	Scottsdale Scorpions	
2017	Ronald Acuña Jr.	Atlanta Braves	OF	Peoria Javelinas	
2018	Keston Hiura	Milwaukee Brewers	2B	Peoria Javelinas	
2019	Royce Lewis	Minnesota Twins	SS	Salt River Rafters	
2020	None (season cancelled due to the COVID-19 pandemic)				
2021	Nelson Velázquez	Chicago Cubs	OF	Mesa Solar Sox	
2022	Heston Kjerstad	Baltimore Orioles	OF	Scottsdale Scorpions	
2023	Jakob Marsee	San Diego Padres	OF	Peoria Javelinas	
2024	Josue Briceño	Detroit Tigers	1B	Scottsdale Scorpions	
2025	Kevin McGonigle	Detroit Tigers	SS	Scottsdale Scorpions	
2026	Welbyn Francisca	St. Louis Cardinals	SS		

=== Stenson Award ===
The Dernell Stenson Sportsmanship Award was created in 2004, in memory of Dernell Stenson, an outfielder for the Scottsdale Scorpions (Cincinnati Reds), who was killed in a carjacking on November 5, 2003. The award is voted on by the managers and coaches of the six Arizona Fall League teams.

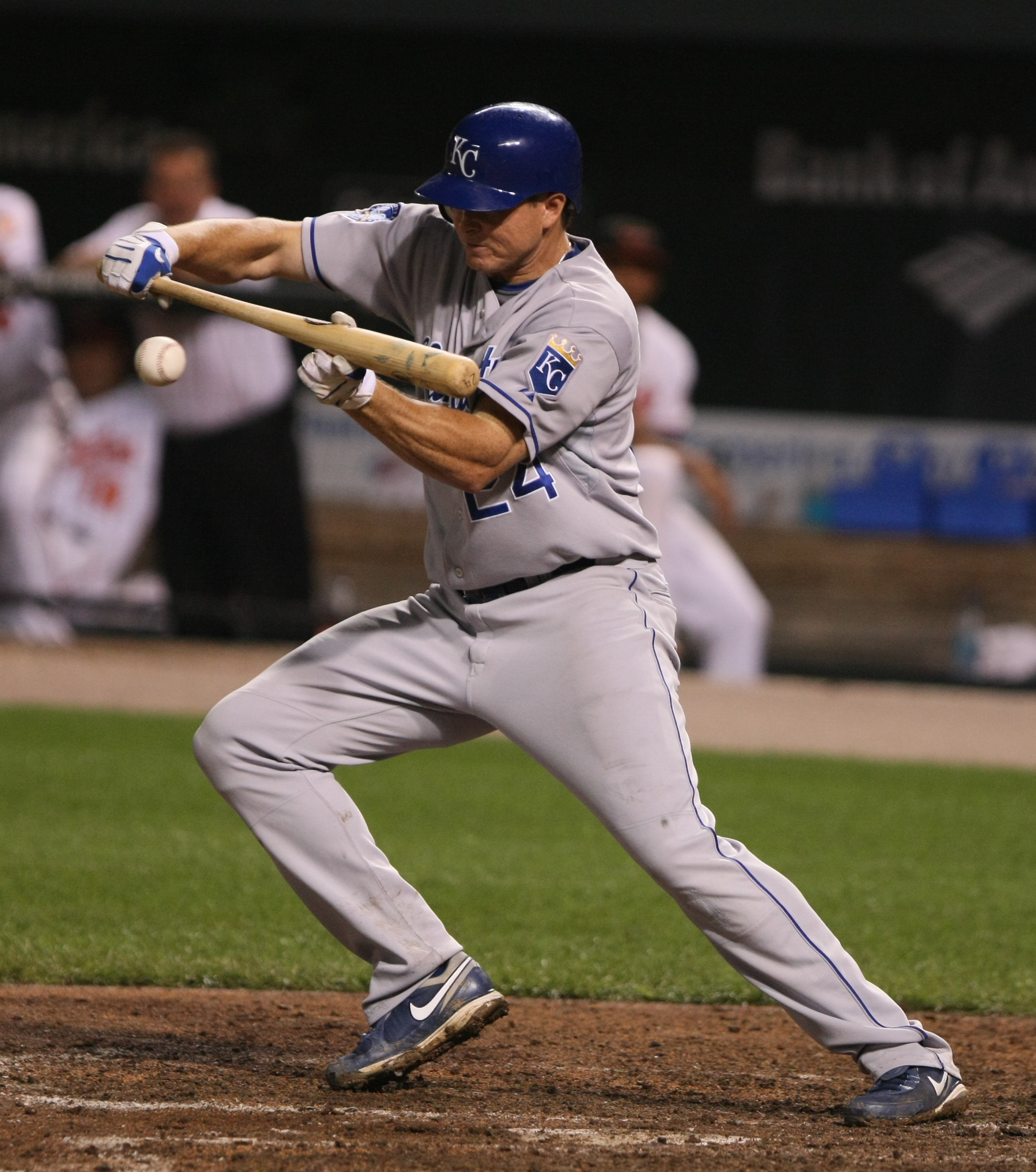
Mark Teahen won the first Stenson Award in 2004.

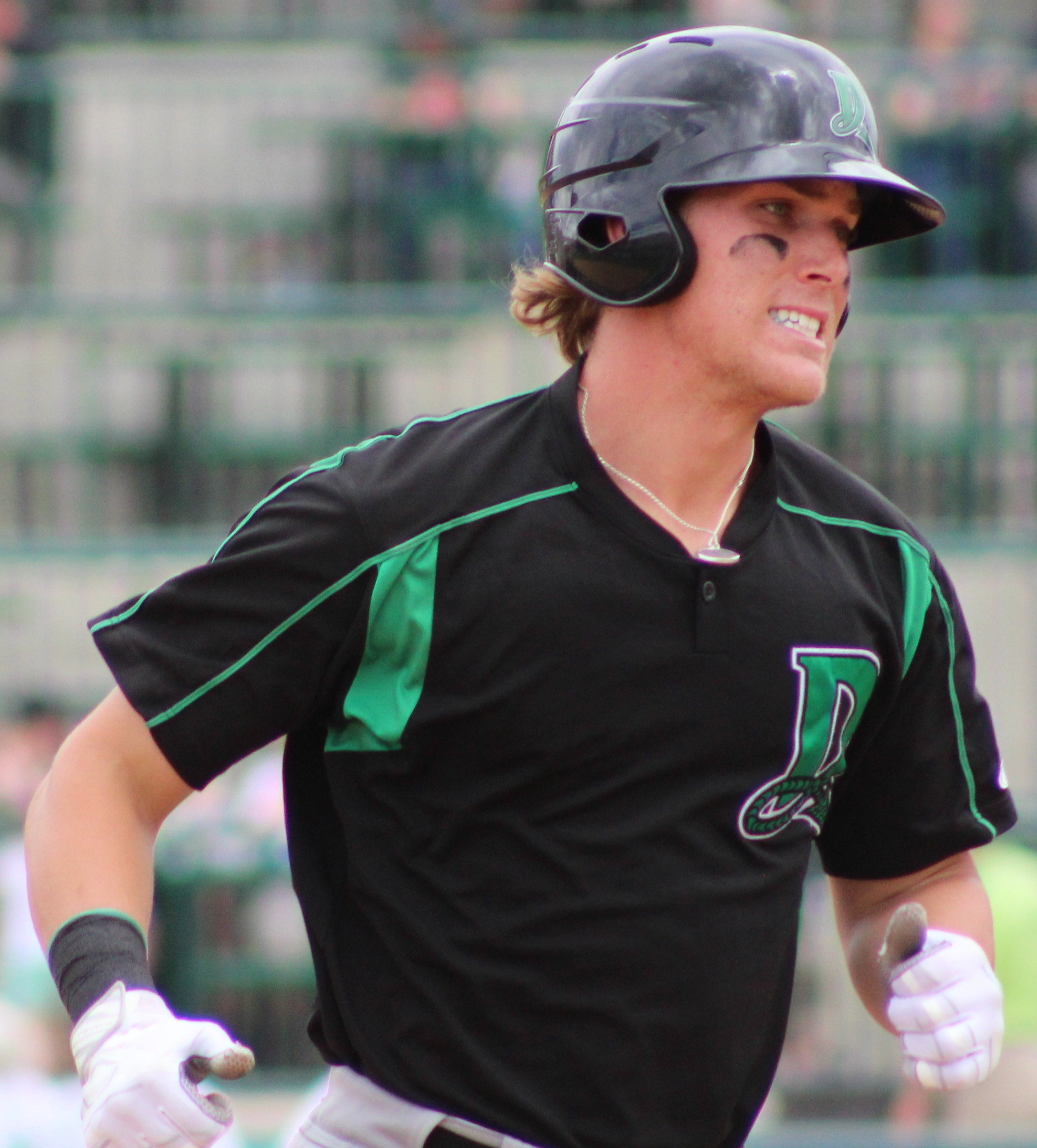
Tyler Stephenson won the Stenson Award in 2019.

Stenson Award winners
Year	Player	Organization	Position	Team	Ref
2004	Mark Teahen	Kansas City Royals	3B	Phoenix Desert Dogs	
2005	Andre Ethier	Oakland Athletics	OF	Phoenix Desert Dogs	
2006	Kevin Frandsen	San Francisco Giants	IF	Scottsdale Scorpions	
2007	Sam Fuld	Chicago Cubs	OF	Mesa Solar Sox	
2008	Jason Donald	Philadelphia Phillies	IF	Mesa Solar Sox	
2009	Russ Mitchell	Los Angeles Dodgers	1B	Peoria Javelinas	
2010	Steve Lombardozzi Jr.	Washington Nationals	3B	Scottsdale Scorpions	
2011	Kevin Mattison	Miami Marlins	OF	Surprise Saguaros	
2012	Cole Kimball	Washington Nationals	P	Salt River Rafters	
2013	Garin Cecchini	Boston Red Sox	3B	Surprise Saguaros	
2014	Patrick Kivlehan	Seattle Mariners	3B	Surprise Saguaros	
2015	Yadiel Rivera	Milwaukee Brewers	IF	Surprise Saguaros	
2016	Austin Nola	Miami Marlins	C	Mesa Solar Sox	
2017	Eric Filia	Seattle Mariners	OF	Peoria Javelinas	
2018	Cole Tucker	Pittsburgh Pirates	SS	Surprise Saguaros	
2019	Tyler Stephenson	Cincinnati Reds	C	Glendale Desert Dogs	
2020	None (season cancelled due to the COVID-19 pandemic)				
2021	Logan O'Hoppe	Philadelphia Phillies	C	Peoria Javelinas	
2022	Lawrence Butler	Oakland Athletics	OF/1B	Mesa Solar Sox	
2023	Michael Trautwein	Cincinnati Reds	C	Surprise Saguaros	
2024	Alejandro Osuna	Texas Rangers	OF	Surprise Saguaros	
2025	Charlie Condon	Colorado Rockies	OF/1B	Salt River Rafters	
2026	Teo Banks	Washington Nationals	OF	Salt River Rafters	

=== AFL Community Champion Award ===
The AFL Community Champion Award was created in 2025, is presented each season to an AFL player who exemplifies a strong commitment to community service and positive impact beyond the game. is presented each season to an AFL player who exemplifies a strong commitment to community service and positive impact beyond the game. This award celebrates a player's contributions to local communities through charitable activities, volunteer work, mentorship, and other acts of service. The recipient is recognized not only for their performance on the field but for their dedication to giving back and being a role model within the community.

Stenson Award winners
Year	Player	Organization	Position	Team	Ref
2025	Logan Wagner	Los Angeles Dodgers	INF	Glendale Desert Dogs	
2026	Maddox Long	Detroit Tigers	RHP	Scottsdale Scorpions	

=== Performance-based awards ===
In 2021, the league added several awards: pitcher, hitter, reliever, breakout player, and defensive player of the year. Winners are listed in the below table with their position and major-league organization.

Performance-based award winners
Year	Pitcher	Hitter	Reliever	Breakout player	Defensive player	Ref.
2021	Owen White (RHP, TEX)	Juan Yepez (1B, STL); J. J. Bleday (OF, MIA)	Graham Spraker (RHP, TOR)	Elijah Dunham (OF, NYY)	Jackson Cluff (SS, WSH)	
2022	Connor Thomas (LHP, STL)	Zac Veen (OF, COL)	Evan Reifert (RHP, TB)	Edouard Julien (2B, MIN)	Luis Matos (OF, SF)	
2023	Ricky Tiedemann (LHP, TOR)	James Triantos (3B, CHC)	Emiliano Teodo (RHP, TEX)	Oliver Dunn (2B, PHI)	Ryan Bliss (2B, SEA)	
2024	Andrew Painter (SP, PHI)	Niko Kavadas (1B, BOS)	Luis Mey (RHP, CIN)	Caleb Durbin, (2B, NYY)	Andrew Pintar (SS, MIA)	
2025	James Hicks (SP, HOU)	Esmerlyn Valdez (OF, PIT)	Cade Denton (RHP, COL)	Owen Ayers (C, CHC)	Enrique Bradfield Jr	
2026	Jarlin Susana (RHP, WSH)	Tai Peete (OF, STL)	Kenya Huggins (RHP, ATH)	Jack O’Dowd (C, COL)	Vance Honeycutt (OF, BAL)	

== Hall of Fame ==
The Arizona Fall League Hall of Fame was created in 2001. The AFL has had over 1,200 former players reach Major League Baseball. Additionally, 18 former AFL managers or players have gone on to manage a major league club after managing in the league. To be considered by the selection committee, a player must be recognized at the major league level as a Rookie of the Year, a Most Valuable Player, an All-Star, or a Gold Glove or Silver Slugger Award winner. Through 2024, there were 46 inductees to the hall.

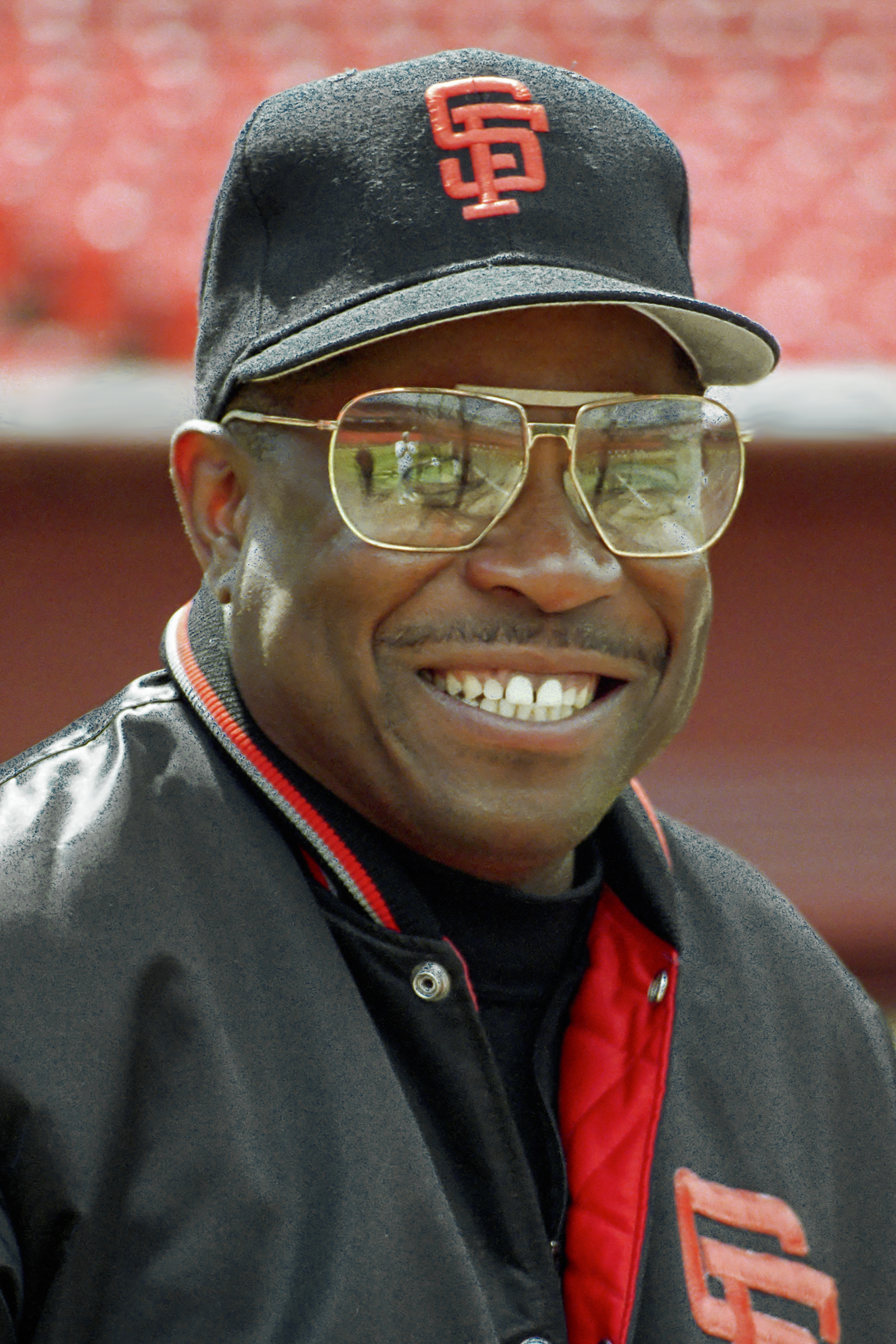
Dusty Baker, manager, inducted 2001

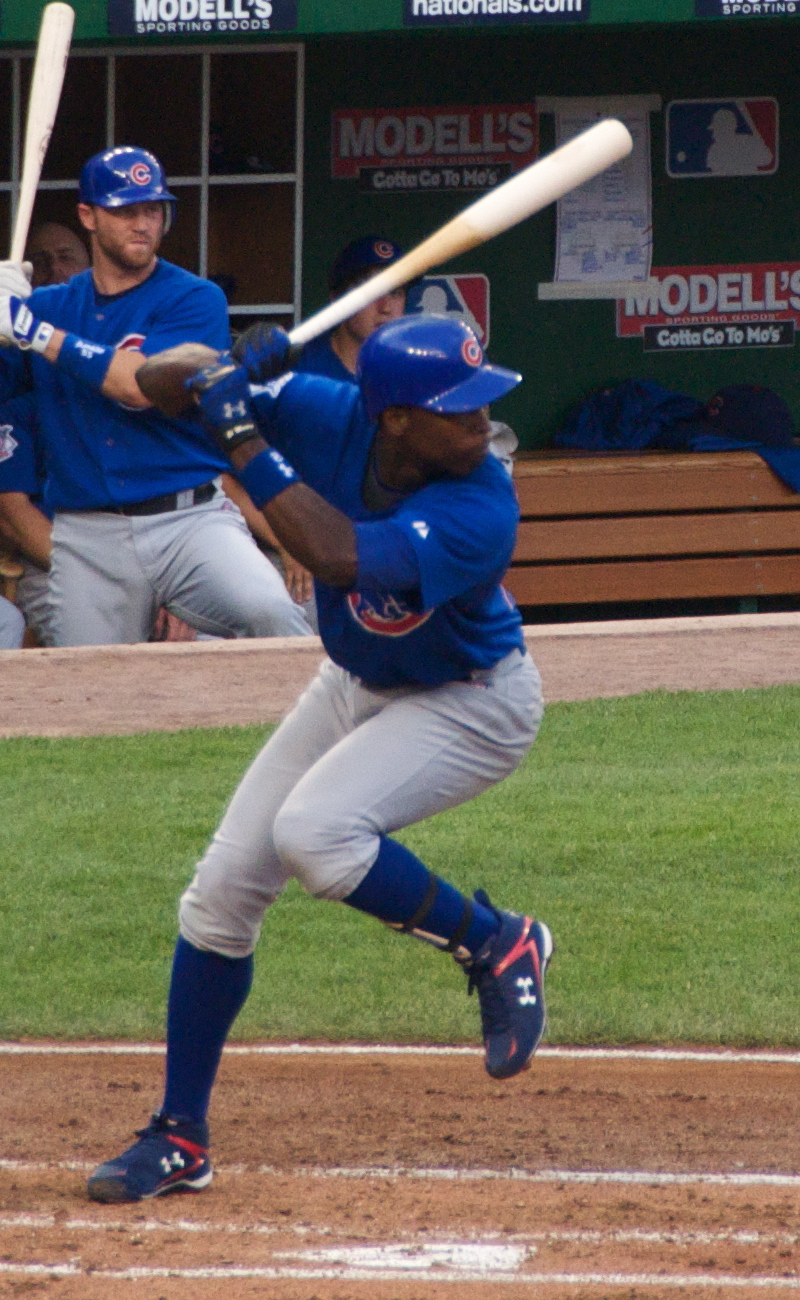
Alfonso Soriano, player, inducted 2006

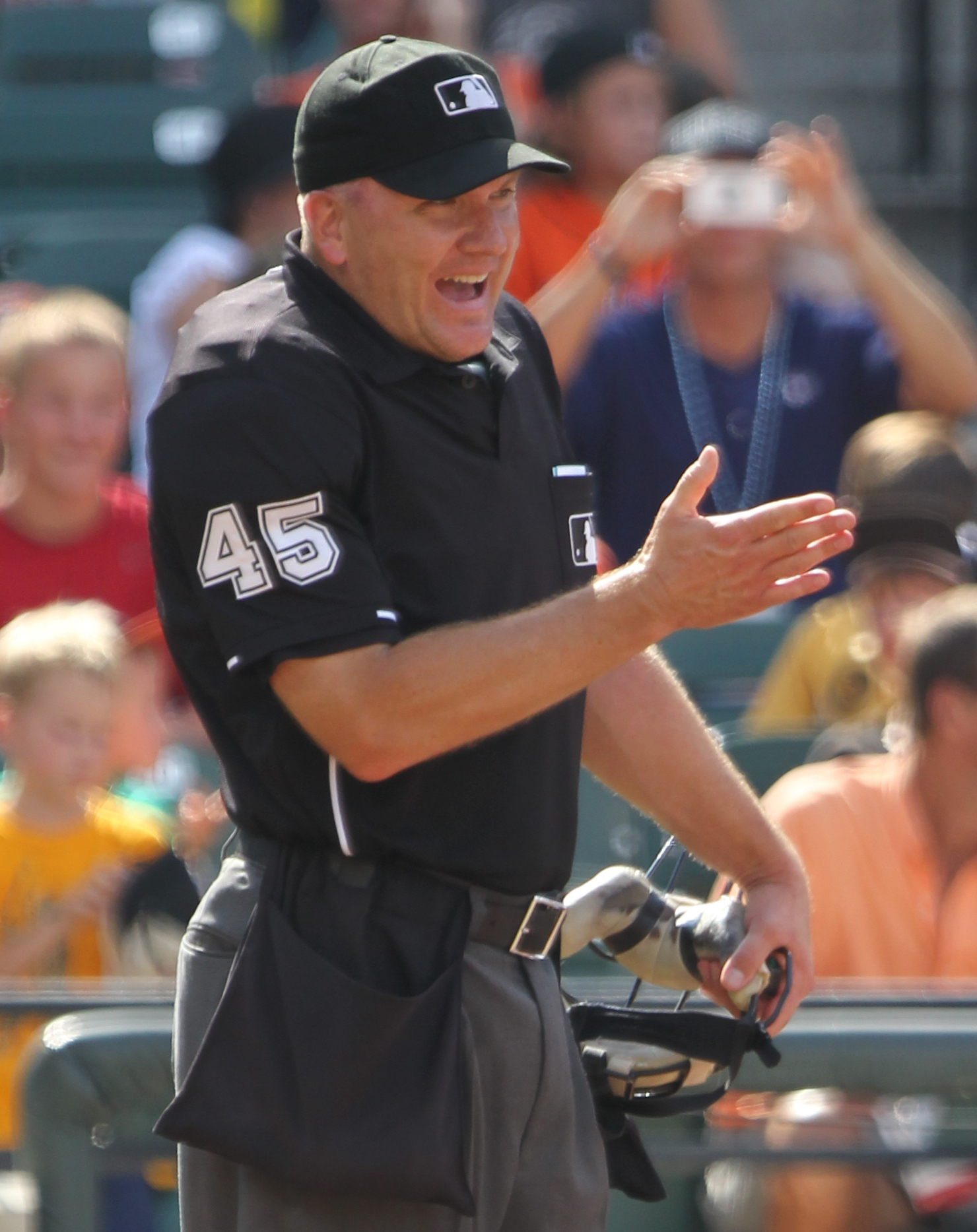
Jeff Nelson, umpire, inducted 2018

HOF year	Inductee	Arizona Fall League			Ref.
HOF year	Inductee	Season	Team	Role	Ref.
2001	Dusty Baker	1992	Scottsdale Scorpions	Manager	
2001	Nomar Garciaparra	1994	Scottsdale Scorpions	Shortstop	
2001	Derek Jeter	1994	Chandler Diamondbacks	Shortstop	
2001	Mike Piazza	1992	Sun Cities Solar Sox	Catcher	
2002	Jason Giambi	1994	Peoria Javelinas	First baseman	
2002	Jerry Manuel	1994	Maryvale Saguaros	Manager	
2003	Shawn Green	1992	Scottsdale Scorpions	Outfielder	
2003	Todd Helton	1996	Peoria Javelinas	First baseman	
2003	Mike Scioscia	1997	Peoria Javelinas	Manager	
2004	Garret Anderson	1993	Scottsdale Scorpions	Outfielder	
2004	Garret Anderson	1994	Tempe Rafters	Outfielder	
2004	Tony Peña	2000	Maryvale Saguaros	Manager	
2004	Albert Pujols	2000	Scottsdale Scorpions	Third baseman	
2005	Troy Percival	1992	Scottsdale Scorpions	Pitcher	
2005	Terry Francona	1992; 1994	Grand Canyon Rafters; Scottsdale Scorpions	Coach; Manager	
2006	Roy Halladay	1998	Grand Canyon Rafters	Pitcher	
2006	Grady Little	1992	Grand Canyon Rafters	Manager	
2006	Alfonso Soriano	1998	Grand Canyon Rafters	Second baseman	
2007	Jermaine Dye	1995	Sun Cities Solar Sox	Outfielder	
2007	Derrek Lee	1995–1996	Sun Cities Solar Sox	First baseman	
2007	Ken Macha	1994	Tempe Rafters	Manager	
2007	Torii Hunter	1998	Phoenix Desert Dogs	Outfielder	
2008	Jimmy Rollins	2000	Maryvale Saguaros	Shortstop	
2008	Eric Wedge	1993	Tucson Javelinas	Catcher	
2009	Brian Giles	1994	Sun Cities Solar Sox	Outfielder	
2010	Chris Carpenter	1996	Phoenix Desert Dogs	Pitcher	
2010	Michael Young	2000	Grand Canyon Rafters	Shortstop	
2011	Ryan Howard	2004	Phoenix Desert Dogs	First baseman	
2011	Paul Konerko	1996	Sun Cities Solar Sox	First baseman	
2012	Derek Lowe	1993; 1995	Sun Cities Solar Sox; Peoria Javelinas	Pitcher	
2012	Mark Teixeira	2002	Peoria Javelinas	Third baseman	
2012	Ron Washington	1992; 1993	Sun Cities Solar Sox; Tucson Javelinas	Coach	
2013	Darin Erstad	1995	Tempe Rafters	Outfielder	
2013	Bob Melvin	1999	Maryvale Saguaros	Manager	
2013	Dustin Pedroia	2004	Scottsdale Scorpions	Shortstop	
2014	Carl Crawford	2001	Maryvale Saguaros	Outfielder	
2014	Matt Holliday	2002–2003	Mesa Solar Sox	Outfielder	
2015	Andrew McCutchen	2007	Phoenix Desert Dogs	Outfielder	
2015	Chase Utley	2002	Grand Canyon Rafters	Third baseman	
2016	Adrián González	2003	Peoria Saguaros	First baseman	
2017	Max Scherzer	2007; 2008	Scottsdale Scorpions; Phoenix Desert Dogs	Pitcher	
2017	Mike Trout	2011	Scottsdale Scorpions	Outfielder	
2017	David Wright	2003	Peoria Saguaros	Third baseman	
2018	Ted Barrett	1993–1995	—	Umpire	
2018	Jeff Nelson	1996	—	Umpire	
2018	Buster Posey	2009	Scottsdale Scorpions	Catcher	
2019	Steve Cobb	1994–2018	—	AFL director	

== All-star game results ==
Through the 2025 edition, East and West have each won 7 of their 14 contests. The 2008 edition was staged as National vs. American and restarted as the same format in 2022 with the American and National each winning 3 times. No game was held in 2020, as the season was canceled due to the COVID-19 pandemic. Only one game, the 2007 edition, has gone into extra innings.

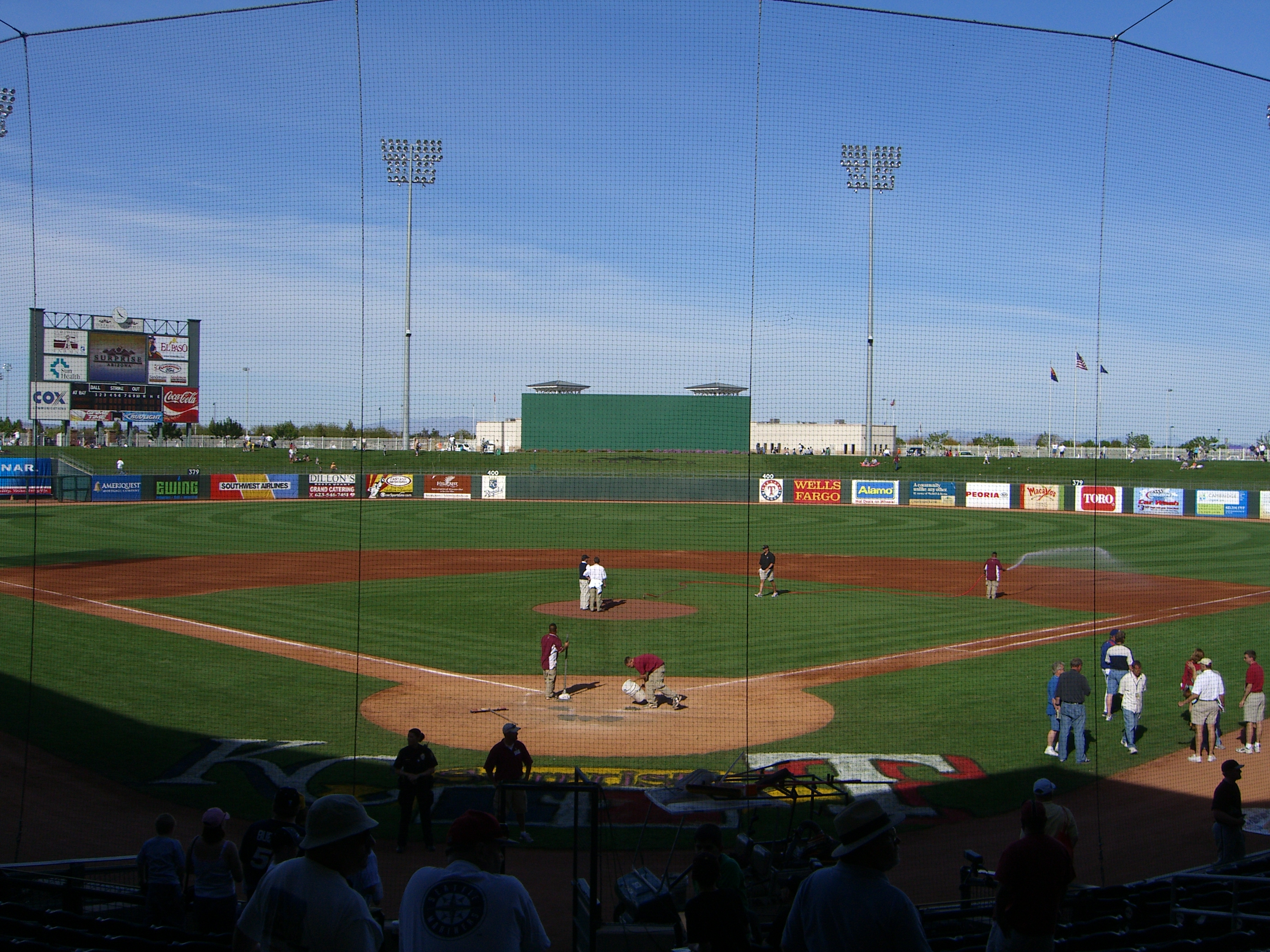
Surprise Stadium in 2006

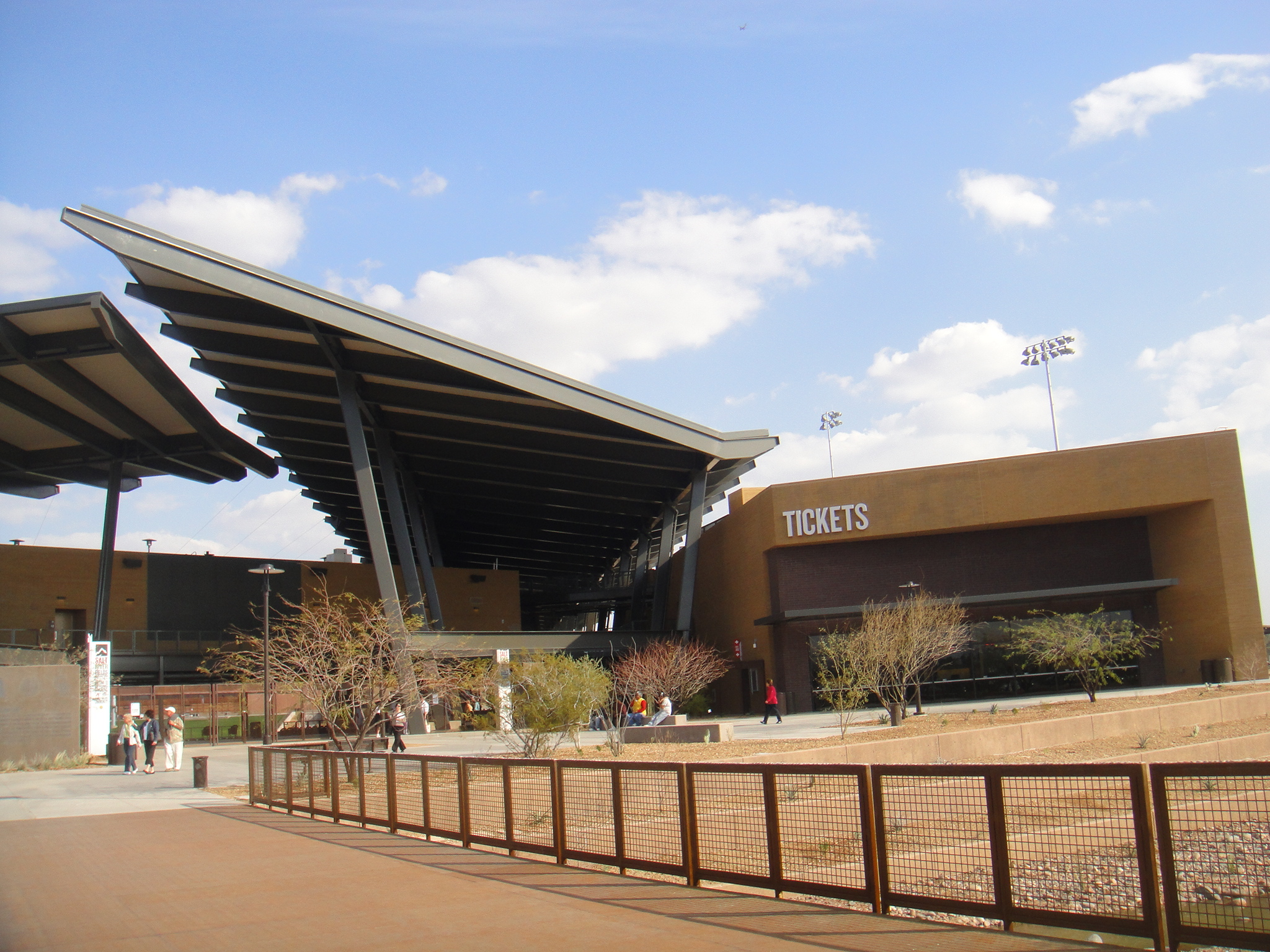
Entrance of Salt River Fields at Talking Stick in 2011

Season	Game date	Winner	Score	Loser	Venue	Ref.
2006	October 27	East	3–1	West	Surprise Stadium	
2007	October 26	East	3–2 (10)	West	Surprise Stadium	
2008	October 24	National	7–6	American	Surprise Stadium	
2009	November 7	West	8–7	East	Surprise Stadium	
2010	November 6	West	3–2	East	Surprise Stadium	
2011	November 5	West	11–2	East	Surprise Stadium	
2012	November 3	East	9–4	West	Salt River Fields at Talking Stick	
2013	November 2	West	9–2	East	Surprise Stadium	
2014	November 1	East	6–2	West	Salt River Fields at Talking Stick	
2015	November 7	West	8–3	East	Salt River Fields at Talking Stick	
2016	November 5	West	12–4	East	Surprise Stadium	
2017	November 4	East	4–2	West	Salt River Fields at Talking Stick	
2018	November 3	West	7–6	East	Surprise Stadium	
2019	October 12	East	4–2	West	Salt River Fields at Talking Stick	
2020	Not played, season canceled					
2021	November 13	East	6–5	West	Salt River Fields at Talking Stick	
2022	November 6	National	9–3	American	Salt River Fields at Talking Stick	
2023	November 5	American	6–3	National	Sloan Park	
2024	November 9	American	6–5	National	Sloan Park	
2025	November 9	American	5–4	National	Sloan Park	
2026	November 8	National	7–4	American	Sloan Park	

== See also ==
- Arizona Fall League rosters
- List of Arizona Fall League stadiums
