= Dernell Stenson =

American baseball player (1978–2003)

- Outfielder
- Born: June 17, 1978; LaGrange, Georgia, U.S.
- Died: November 5, 2003 (aged 25); Chandler, Arizona, U.S.
- Batted: Left Threw: Left

MLB debut
- August 13, 2003, for the Cincinnati Reds

Last MLB appearance
- September 28, 2003, for the Cincinnati Reds

MLB statistics
- Batting average: .247
- Home runs: 3
- Runs batted in: 13
- Stats at Baseball Reference

Teams
- Cincinnati Reds (2003)

Dernell Renauld Stenson (June 17, 1978 – November 5, 2003) was an American professional baseball outfielder. He played in Major League Baseball (MLB) for the Cincinnati Reds. He batted and threw left-handed.

== Baseball career ==
The youngest of eight children, Dernell was the son of lumberjack James Stenson and his wife Cora. He starred in baseball at LaGrange High School in LaGrange, Georgia, the same high school attended by MLB outfielder Mike Cameron. There, Stenson attracted the attention of scouts for the Boston Red Sox, and he was selected in the third round with the ninety-first overall pick of the 1996 Major League Baseball draft.

Stenson advanced quickly through the low minor leagues before reaching a plateau at Triple-A. He spent parts of four seasons at the Red Sox' affiliate in Pawtucket before leaving the organization as a six-year minor league free agent. Stenson signed with the Cincinnati Reds for the 2003 season, and after performing well in the minors, including batting .306 with 14 home runs and a RBI total of 76 in 101 games with the Double-A Chattanooga Lookouts, he was called up in September. Stenson appeared in a total of 37 games, primarily as a left or right fielder, batting .247 with three home runs in 81 at-bats. After the season, Stenson was chosen to represent his organization in the Arizona Fall League (AFL).

While playing with the Scottsdale Scorpions of the AFL, Stenson was murdered in Chandler, Arizona. The AFL suspended play for two days after Stenson's murder. In 2004, the league inaugurated the Dernell Stenson Sportsmanship Award, given to a player who displays the values of perseverance and humility. His number, 26, was posthumously retired by the Lookouts.

== Death investigation ==
The incident initially appeared to be a carjacking; Stenson was bound, shot in the head and chest, and then run over with his own SUV, a 2002 Isuzu Rodeo. Information which surfaced following the murder indicated that it may have been the culmination of a more elaborate scheme.

Four men were ultimately arrested for the crime, with robbery stated as motive. Reginald Riddle and David Griffith were both charged with six felonies, among them first-degree murder, kidnapping, and armed robbery. Reginald Riddle agreed to a plea to avoid a possible death sentence. He received a sentence of 25 years to life in prison in exchange for testifying against his co-defendant, David Griffith. Prosecutors elected to seek the death penalty for Griffith. Kevin Riddle (Reginald's half-brother), pleaded guilty to charges of auto theft, hindering prosecution, and attempted hindering prosecution. He received a sentence of eight years and nine months in prison. Charges against a fourth man, Robert Maye, were dropped after it was determined that he was a protected federal witness who had testified against the Chicago-based Gangster Disciples street gang.

In December 2007, Griffith was sentenced to life in prison without the possibility of parole after pleading guilty to murder, armed robbery, and kidnapping. Riddle pleaded guilty to first-degree murder in 2006 as a part of a plea bargain; on January 25, 2008, he was sentenced to life in prison but will be eligible for parole in 2033, 25 years into his life sentence.

== See also ==
- List of baseball players who died during their careers
