= Peoria Javelinas =

Professional baseball team

- Founded in 1992; Peoria, Arizona

Minor league affiliations
- Class: Class A to Triple-A
- League: Arizona Fall League (1992–present)
- Division: West Division (2009–present)

Major league affiliations
- Teams: Cincinnati Reds; Baltimore Orioles; St. Louis Cardinals; San Diego Padres; Seattle Mariners

Minor league titles
- League titles (8): 1994; 1997; 2002; 2009; 2012; 2017; 2018; 2026
- Division titles (10): 1993; 1994; 1997; 2002; 2009; 2010; 2012; 2014; 2017; 2018

Team data
- Name: Peoria Javelinas (1994–present)
- Previous names: Tucson Javelinas (1992–1993)
- Ballpark: Peoria Sports Complex (2015–present)
- Previous parks: Surprise Stadium (2013–2014); Peoria Sports Complex (1994–2012); Hi Corbett Field (1992–1993)
- Manager: Julio Morillo

The Peoria Javelinas are a baseball team based in Peoria, Arizona, that competes in the West Division of the Arizona Fall League. The team plays its home games at Peoria Sports Complex. The ballpark is also the spring training facility for the San Diego Padres and the Seattle Mariners. The team was established in 1992 as the Tucson Javelinas, and played for two seasons under that name. The Javelinas have won the most championships,with eight, of any team in the Arizona Fall League, most recently in 2026.

== History ==
For the 2011 season, Major League Baseball teams sending players to the Javelinas were: the Milwaukee Brewers, New York Mets, San Diego Padres, St. Louis Cardinals, and Seattle Mariners. For 2012 the Minnesota Twins and Cincinnati Reds were added while the Mets and Cardinals were dropped. For 2013 and 2014 the Javelinas played their games at Surprise Stadium while the Peoria Sports Complex underwent renovations. In 2013, the Houston Astros and Kansas City Royals replaced the Twins and Reds. In 2014 the Atlanta Braves, Cleveland Indians, Kansas City Royals, St. Louis Cardinals, and Tampa Bay Rays sent players to the Javelinas and the usual "home" teams of San Diego and Seattle did not. However, for 2015, the Javelinas returned to Peoria Sports Complex and the line up includes the Padres and Mariners along with the Atlanta Braves, Baltimore Orioles, and Cincinnati Reds.

== Notable alumni ==
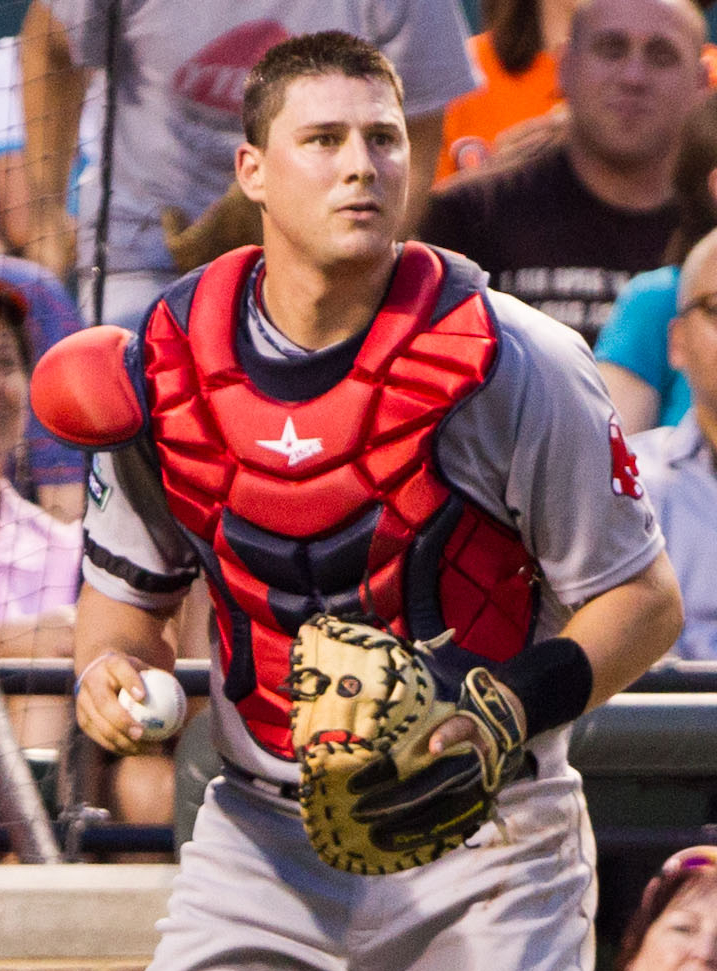
Ryan Lavarnway

- Nate Freiman, first baseman for the Oakland Athletics
- Max Fried, pitcher for the Atlanta Braves
- Jason Giambi, first baseman for the Oakland Athletics
- Didi Gregorius, shortstop for the Cincinnati Reds
- Todd Helton, first baseman for the Colorado Rockies
- Kenley Jansen, pitcher for the Boston Red Sox
- Jason Kipnis, second baseman for the Cleveland Indians
- Ryan Lavarnway, catcher for the Baltimore Orioles
- Kevin Quackenbush, pitcher for the Cincinnati Reds
- Mike Scioscia, Former manager of the Los Angeles Angels
- Dustin Ackley, second baseman and outfielder for the Seattle Mariners
- Ronald Acuña, outfielder for the Atlanta Braves
- Tyler O'Neill, outfielder for the St. Louis Cardinals

== Roster ==
Peoria Javelinas roster
Players		Coaches/Other
Pitchers: 50 Cody Adcock (CIN); 40 Braxton Bragg (BAL); 33 Winyer Chourio (SD); 13 Ty Cummings (SEA); 9 Victor Diaz (CIN); 16 Nate Dohm (STL); 20 Reid Easterly (SEA); 72 Frank Elissalt (STL); 27 Jose Geraldo (SEA); 38 Igor Gil (SD); 35 Kailen Hamson (BAL); 21 Trent Hodgdon (CIN); 29 Luke Holman (CIN); 24 Kannon Kemp (SD); 47 Joseph King (STL); 14 Kiefer Lord (BAL); 34 Jose Montero (CIN); 74 Francis Peña (SD); 19 Patrick Reilly (BAL); 28 Tekoah Roby (STL); 43 Calvin Schapira (SEA); 96 Teddy Sharkey (BAL); 48 Adam Smith (SEA); 77 Nolan Sparks (STL); 54 Jordan Valenzuela (SD); 36 Michael Watson (STL)	Catchers: 32 Matthew Ellis (SEA); 2 Ty Harvey (SD); 37 Boston Smith (SEA); Infielders: 6 Brandon Butterworth (BAL); 5 Justin DeCriscio (SD); 4 Brandon Eike (SEA); 15 Carter Graham (CIN); 7 Sammy Hernandez (STL); 8 Cade McGee (STL); 12 Carlos Sanchez (CIN); Outfielders: 55 Yerlin Confidan (CIN); 25 Vance Honeycutt (BAL); 10 Ike Irish (BAL); 11 Alex McCoy (SD); 22 Tai Peete (STL)	Manager: -- Danny Worth; Coaches: -- Jordan Cowan (hitting); -- Andrew Elliott (pitching); -- Billy Facteau (bench); 7-day injured list; ~ Development list; # Rehab assignment; ∞ Reserve list; ‡ Restricted list; § Suspended list; † Temporarily inactive list; Roster updated October 2, 2026; → More rosters: MiLB • Arizona Fall League

== See also ==
- Arizona Fall League § Results by season
