= Salt River Rafters =

Professional baseball team

- Founded in 1992; Salt River Pima–Maricopa Indian Community, Arizona
Team logo
Cap insignia

Minor league affiliations
- Class: Class A to Triple-A
- League: Arizona Fall League (1993–present)
- Division: East Division (2011–present)

Major league affiliations
- Teams: Arizona Diamondbacks; Colorado Rockies; Minnesota Twins; New York Yankees; Washington Nationals

Minor league titles
- League titles (6): 1993; 2000; 2011; 2014; 2019; 2024
- Division titles (13): 1993; 1997; 1998; 2000; 2001; 2006; 2007; 2011; 2012; 2014; 2018; 2019; 2024

Team data
- Name: Salt River Rafters (2011–present)
- Previous names: Surprise Rafters (2007–2010); Grand Canyon Rafters (1997–2006); Tempe Rafters (1993–1996); Grand Canyon Rafters (1992)
- Ballpark: Salt River Fields at Talking Stick (2011–present)
- Previous parks: Surprise Stadium (2005–2010); Scottsdale Stadium (1997–2004); Tempe Diablo Stadium (1993–1996); Brazell Stadium (1992)
- Manager: Tyler "Doc" Smarslok

The Salt River Rafters are a baseball team that plays in the East Division of the Arizona Fall League. They play their home games at Salt River Fields at Talking Stick in the Salt River Pima–Maricopa Indian Community near Scottsdale, Arizona. The ballpark is also the spring training facility of the Arizona Diamondbacks and Colorado Rockies. The team was established in 1992 as the Grand Canyon Rafters, and has changed locations several times while retaining the same nickname. The Rafters have won six league championships, most recently in 2024. They have won the most division titles, 13, of any team within the Arizona Fall League.

== Notable alumni ==
- Garret Anderson, former outfielder for the Los Angeles Angels
- Nolan Arenado, All-Star third baseman, St. Louis Cardinals
- Jake Bird (born 1995), pitcher for the Washington Nationals
- Jesse Chavez, pitcher for the Toronto Blue Jays
- Ike Davis, first baseman for the Oakland Athletics
- Adam Eaton, former outfielder with the Washington Nationals
- Terry Francona, manager of the Cleveland Guardians, formerly of the Boston Red Sox
- Roy Halladay, former pitcher for the Toronto Blue Jays and the Philadelphia Phillies
- Ryan Klesko, former first baseman and corner outfielder for Atlanta Braves, San Diego Padres, SF Giants.
- Jake Lamb, third baseman for the Arizona Diamondbacks
- Grady Little, former manager of the Boston Red Sox and the Los Angeles Dodgers
- Kevin Pillar, outfielder for the Toronto Blue Jays and San Francisco Giants
- Alfonso Soriano, former outfielder for the New York Yankees, member of the 40–40 club
- Michael Young, former infielder for the Texas Rangers
- Rowdy Tellez, first baseman/designated hitter for the Atlanta Braves
- Josh Zeid, pitcher for the Houston Astros

== Roster ==
Salt River Rafters roster
Players	Coaches/Other
Pitchers: 52 Joe Ariola (ARI); 21 Luke Craig (ARI); 8 Noah Dean (WAS); 35 Ross Dunn (MIN); 22 Konner Eaton (COL); 38 Mack Estrada (NYY); 33 J.T. Etheridge (NYY); 53 Stu Flesland III (COL); 16 Connor Foley (ARI); 9 Patrick Forbes (ARI); 81 Nolan Hughes (WAS); 49 Cesar Lares (MIN); 99 Cleiber Maldonado (MIN); 88 Hunter Mann (COL); 30 Jake Murray (MIN); 25 R.J. Sales (WAS); 45 Sean Sullivan (COL); 91 Jarlin Susana (WAS); 27 Fidel Ulloa (COL); 17 Chris Veach (NYY); 41 John West (ARI); 39 Brian Zeldin (MIN); Catchers: 18 Jack O'Dowd (COL); Infielders: 1 Demetrio Crisantes (ARI)); 8 Kyle DeBarge (MIN); 12 Core Jackson (NYY); 11 Dax Kilby (NYY); 6 Andy Perez (COL); 5 Yassel Soler (ARI)); 24 Kyle West (NYY); Outfielders: 20 Teo Banks (WAS); 29 Nathan Hall (ARI)); 4 Jacob McCombs (MIN); 23 Yasser Mercedes (MIN); 31 Jorgelys Mota (WAS); 2 Jared Thomas (COL)	Manager: -- Ted Tom; Coaches: -- Scott Nestor (hitting); -- Owen Cuffe (pitching); -- Carter Kessinger (pitching); -- Jerry Sullivan (pitching); -- Ronald Ramirez; 7-day injured list; ~ Development list; # Rehab assignment; ∞ Reserve list; ‡ Restricted list; § Suspended list; † Temporarily inactive list; Roster updated September 15, 2026; → More rosters: MiLB • Arizona Fall League

== See also ==
- Arizona Fall League § Results by season
