= Salt River Fields at Talking Stick =

Stadium complex in the Salt River Pima–Maricopa Indian Community

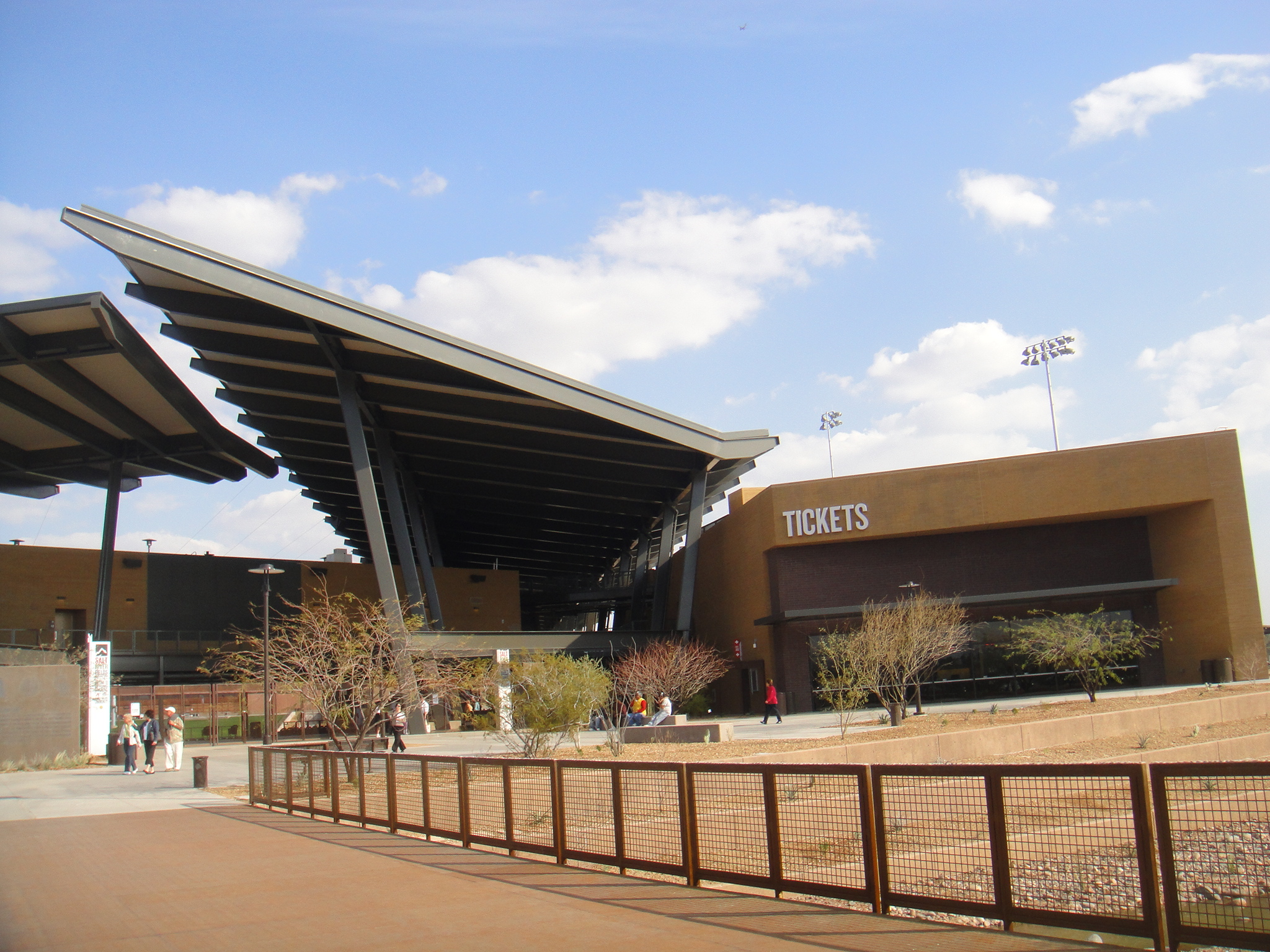
- The main entry to the stadium behind home plate
- Interactive map of Salt River Fields at Talking Stick
- Full name: Salt River Fields at Talking Stick
- Location: 7555 N. Pima Road; Scottsdale, AZ 85258; U.S.
- Coordinates: 33°32′46″N 111°53′7″W
- Owner: Salt River Pima–Maricopa Indian Community
- Capacity: 11,000
- Surface: Bermuda Grass
- Record attendance: 14,035 (March 16, 2019, D-Backs vs Cubs)
- Field size: Left Field – 345 feet (105 m); Left-Center – 390 feet (119 m); Center Field – 410 feet (125 m); Right-Center – 390 feet (119 m); Right Field – 345 feet (105 m)
- Acreage: 140 acres
- Public transit: Valley Metro Bus: 81

Construction
- Groundbreaking: November 17, 2009
- Opened: February 11, 2011
- Cost: $100 million ($143 million in 2025 dollars)
- Architect: HKS, Inc.
- General contractor: Mortenson Construction

Tenants
- Colorado Rockies (MLB) (spring training) (2011–present); Arizona Diamondbacks (MLB) (spring training) (2011–present); Salt River Rafters (AFL) (2011–present); Hokkaido Nippon-Ham Fighters (NPB) (spring training) (2018–present)

Website
- saltriverfields.com

Salt River Fields at Talking Stick is a stadium complex located in the Salt River Pima–Maricopa Indian Community near Scottsdale, Arizona, United States, at the former site of the Pavilion Lakes Golf Club. It serves as the Major League Baseball spring-training facility for the Arizona Diamondbacks and the Colorado Rockies, replacing Tucson Electric Park for the Diamondbacks and Hi Corbett Field for the Rockies. The complex represents the first MLB park to be built on Native American Indian land.

== History ==
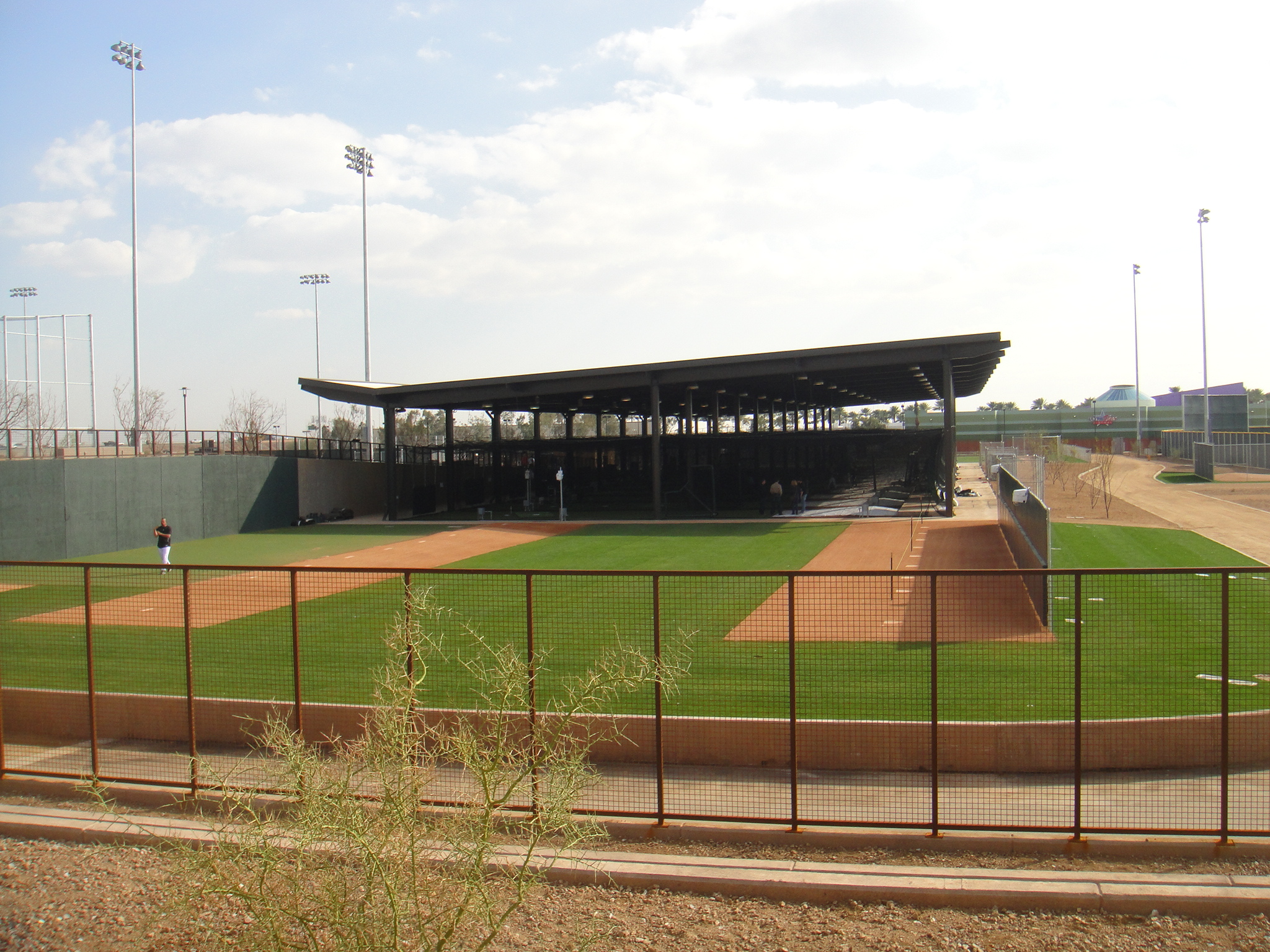
Batting cages and bullpens for the Colorado Rockies

In 2009, after the Chicago White Sox moved their spring-training facilities from Tucson to Phoenix, the Diamondbacks and Rockies expressed their desire to leave Tucson. The teams began negotiations with multiple valley cities and Indian communities, with the Salt River Pima–Maricopa Indian Community coming out on top with a 20-year commitment from the teams to the facility. Construction began on November 17, 2009, with a ground-breaking ceremony by Diamondbacks President and CEO Derrick Hall, as an aggressive, fast-tracked schedule—to get the stadium done by the 2011 spring-training season—began.

The field turf is made up of a specially engineered Tifway 419 Bermuda Grass grown in Eloy. There are 7,000 fixed seats in the grandstand and 4,000 lawn seats for a total estimated seating capacity of 11,000, but a game on March 24, 2013, drew a crowd given as 12,864. Luxury suites, three party pavilions, and a kids zone are further amenities. Each team has an 85,000-square-foot (7,900 m^{2}) clubhouse (with offices, fitness, and locker rooms), six full-size practice fields (one with the same dimensions as the respective team's home stadium), two infield-only practice diamonds, and batting cages. The Diamondbacks occupy the facilities along the left field area and the Rockies are in the right-field area. Several points of access to the stadium bring visitors in through the middle of the practice fields and batting facilities. The complex also has two lit soccer fields and a three-acre man-made lake which is home to 17,000 fish.

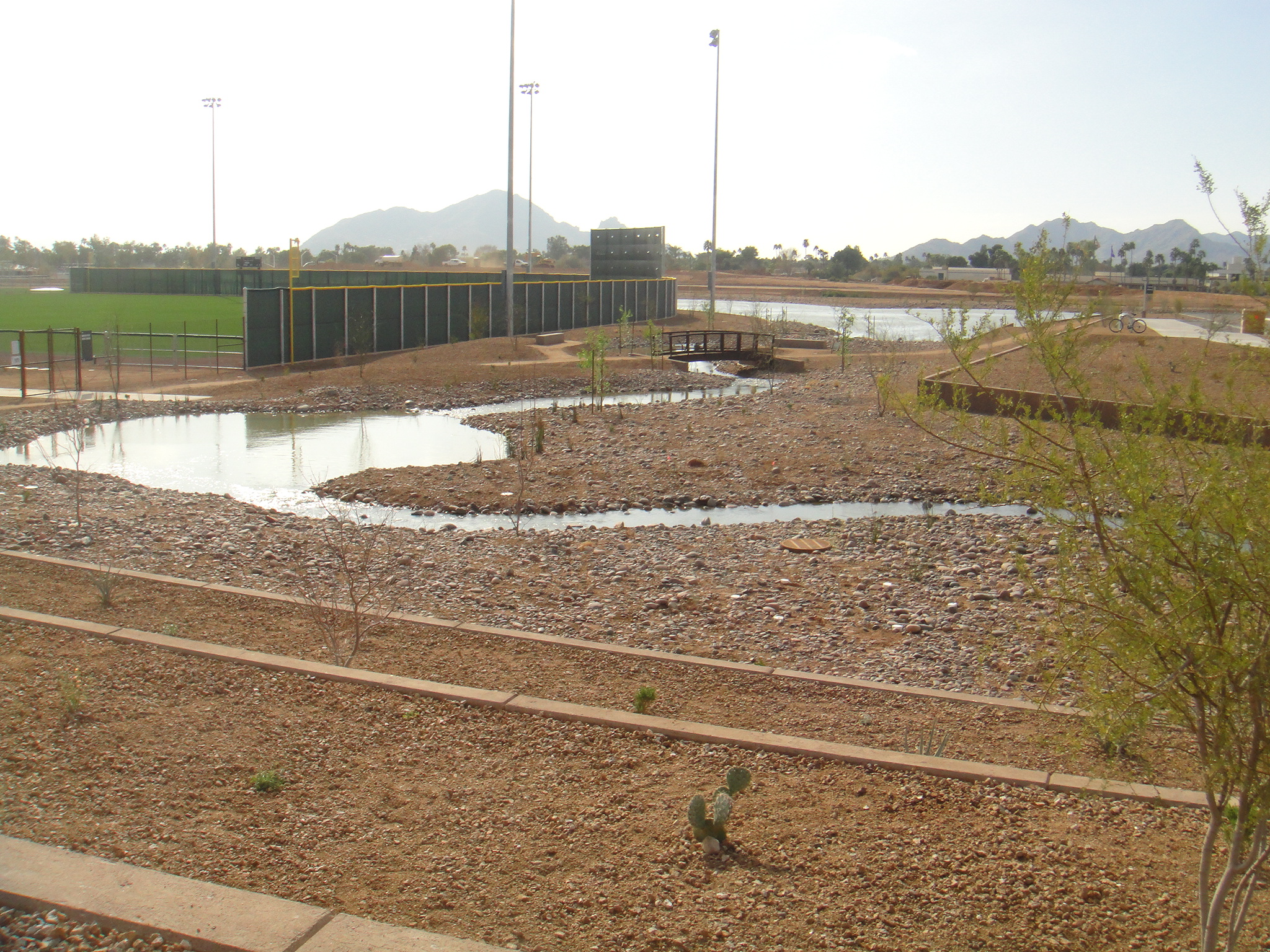
The stream leading to the lake at Salt River Fields

The stadium was completed on time, with the first game being played between the Diamondbacks and Rockies on February 26, 2011. The ceremonial first pitch was delivered by Salt River Pima–Maricopa Indian Tribal President Diane Enos and Vice President Martin Harvier. The national anthem was performed by the Salt River Elementary School choir. The Rockies won the first game, 8–7, after 10 innings of play. It has opened to rave reviews from the athletes, fans, and critics. Commissioner of Baseball Bud Selig said, "Everyone told me it was remarkable. It's even better than that."

According to a 2011 report by The Arizona Republic, the Cactus League generated more than $300 million a year in economic impact to the greater Phoenix metropolitan area economy. The Salt River Fields at Talking Stick complex was the latest of eight new stadiums built in the Valley of the Sun during a 20-year span. The Arizona Republic also reported that more than $500 million was spent on "building eight new stadiums and renovating two others for the 15 teams in the Valley."

The 2011 Cactus League games set a new attendance record, with 1.59 million attending games at the various stadiums in the Phoenix metro area. Much of the attendance surge was attributed to the Salt Rivers Fields at Talking Stick venue that accounted for 22% of the Cactus League attendance. In the inaugural spring-training season at the park, the Arizona Diamondbacks enjoyed a record-breaking 189,737 spectators at 17 spring-training games, with an average of 11,161 spectators per game, up more than 90% from 2010.

Preceded by Tucson Electric Park	Home of the Arizona Diamondbacks Spring Training; 2011–present	Succeeded by Current
Preceded by Hi Corbett Field	Home of the Colorado Rockies Spring Training; 2011–present	Succeeded by Current
