= Scottsdale Scorpions =

Professional baseball team

- Founded in 1992; Scottsdale, Arizona
Team logo
Cap insignia

Minor league affiliations
- Class: Class A to Triple-A
- League: Arizona Fall League (1992–present)
- Division: East Division (2009–present)

Major league affiliations
- Teams: Detroit Tigers; Houston Astros; Milwaukee Brewers; San Francisco Giants; Tampa Bay Rays

Minor league titles
- League titles (3): 1996; 2010; 2015
- Division titles (6): 1996; 2002; 2004; 2005; 2010; 2015

Team data
- Name: Scottsdale Scorpions (2007–present)
- Previous names: Grand Canyon Scorpions (2006); Surprise Scorpions (2005); Scottsdale Scorpions (1992–2004)
- Ballpark: Scottsdale Stadium (2006–present)
- Previous parks: Surprise Stadium (2005); Scottsdale Stadium (1992–2004)
- Manager: Marty Malloy

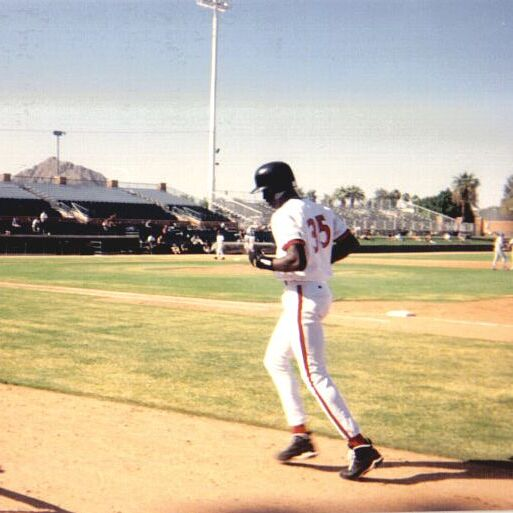
Michael Jordan, #35

The Scottsdale Scorpions are a baseball team that plays in the East Division of the Arizona Fall League. They play their home games in Scottsdale, Arizona, at Scottsdale Stadium, which is also the spring training facility of the San Francisco Giants. The team was established in 1992 and has retained the Scorpions nickname through several location changes. The Scorpions have won three league championships, most recently in 2015.

== History ==
In the fall of 1994, the team gained worldwide media attention, when Michael Jordan joined the Scorpions after playing his first minor league baseball season with the Double-A Birmingham Barons in Birmingham, Alabama.

The Scorpions won their first championship in 1996, against the Mesa Saguaros. The Scorpions reached the championship game in 2002, 2004, and 2005 but failed to win it. For the 2005 season, the team played its games in Surprise, Arizona, due to renovations of Scottsdale Stadium. The team returned to Scottsdale Stadium the following year, renamed as the Grand Canyon Scorpions. The team changed their name back to Scottsdale Scorpions for the 2007 season. The Scorpions won the league championship in 2010, their first in 14 years. They also won the championship in 2015.

== Notable alumni ==
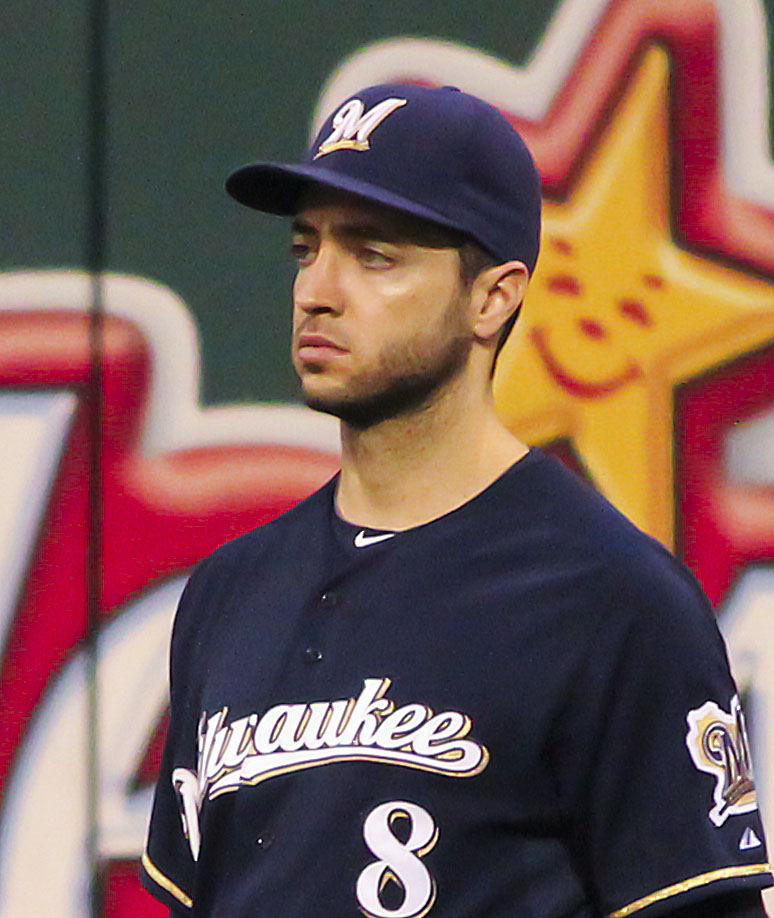
Ryan Braun

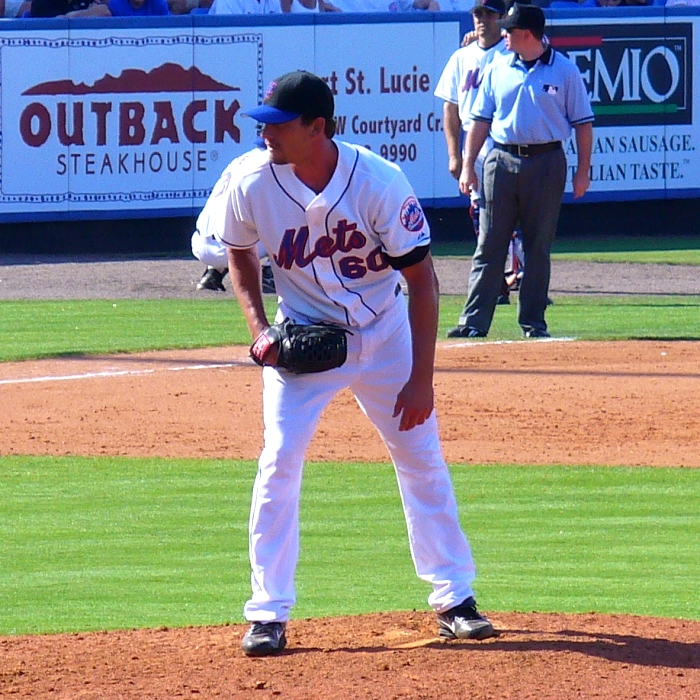
Scott Schoeneweis

- Dusty Baker, former outfielder and manager
- Josh Bard, former catcher and current bench coach for the New York Yankees
- Tim Tebow, retired National Football League quarterback and onetime minor league baseball player in the New York Mets organization
- Ryan Braun, outfielder for the Milwaukee Brewers
- Emmanuel Burriss, utility player for the Philadelphia Phillies
- Terry Francona, manager of the Cleveland Indians
- Nomar Garciaparra, former shortstop and current ESPN baseball analyst
- Shawn Green, retired outfielder
- Bryce Harper, first baseman for the Philadelphia Phillies
- Derek Jeter, retired shortstop for the New York Yankees and former CEO of the Miami Marlins
- Michael Jordan, retired NBA player as part of the Chicago White Sox organization
- Aaron Judge, outfielder for the New York Yankees
- Scott Kingery (born 1994), player for the Philadelphia Phillies
- James Loney, retired first baseman
- Evan Longoria, third baseman for the San Francisco Giants
- Russell Martin, catcher for the Toronto Blue Jays
- Luis Matos, 2021 AFL Defensive Player of the Year, San Francisco Giants
- Will Middlebrooks, retired third baseman, formerly of the Colorado Springs Sky Sox
- Kendrys Morales, designated hitter for the Toronto Blue Jays.
- Troy Percival, retired closing pitcher for the Los Angeles Angels of Anaheim
- Albert Pujols, first baseman and designated hitter for the St. Louis Cardinals, formerly of the Los Angeles Dodgers and the Los Angeles Angels of Anaheim.
- Scott Schoeneweis, retired pitcher
- Zack Thornton, pitcher
- Mike Trout, outfielder for the Los Angeles Angels of Anaheim
- Brandon Webb, retired pitcher for the Arizona Diamondbacks
- Gleyber Torres, second baseman for the New York Yankees
- Dustin Pedroia, retired second baseman for the Boston Red Sox
- Miguel Andújar, third baseman for the New York Yankees
- Tyler Austin, first baseman for the Yokohama DeNA Baystars

== Stenson Award ==
The Stenson Award was created in 2004 by the Arizona Fall League, in memory of Dernell Stenson, a Scorpions outfielder (Cincinnati Reds), who was killed in a carjacking on November 5, 2003.

== Roster ==
Scottsdale Scorpions roster
Players	Coaches/Other
Pitchers: 43 Pablo Aldonis (WAS); 32 Austin Amaral (WAS); 55 Brett Banks (NYM); 24 Jake Bennett (WAS); 36 Anderson Brito (HOU); 66 Ricardo Estrada (SF); 20 Dariel Fregio (DET); -- Brett Gillis (HOU); 22 James Hicks (HOU); 50 Wyatt Hudepohl (NYM); 21 Bryce Jenkins (NYM); 16 Hudson Leach (HOU); 38 Carlos Leqyerica (DET); 48 Sean Paul Liñan (WAS); 78 Ernesto Mercedes (NYM); 86 Spencer Miles (SF); 33 Jake Miller (DET); 17 Ryan Murphy (SF); 35 Jose T. Perez (SF); 23 Juan Sanchez (SF); 10 Kenny Serwa (DET); 37 Jared Simpson (WAS); 15 Austin Troesser (NYM); 77 Derek True (HOU); 18 Nate Wohlgemuth (HOU); Catchers: 27 Walker Janek (HOU); 13 Axiel Plaz (PIT); 11 Chris Suero (NYM); Infielders: 1 Maui Ahuna (SF); 25 Max Anderson (DET); 40 Parks Harber (SF); 5 Seaver King (WAS); 12 Walker Martin (SF); 9 Kevin McGonigle (DET); 14 Jack Penney (DET); 6 D'Andre Smith (NYM); 4 Jeron Williams (HOU); Outfielders: 3 Nick Morabito (NYM); 2 Sam Petersen (WAS); 28 Ethan Petry (WAS); 8 Joseph Sullivan (HOU)	Manager: -- René Rivera; Coaches: -- Nate Keavy (pitching); -- Jeff Livesey (hitting); -- Daniel McKinney; 7-day injured list; ~ Development list; # Rehab assignment; ∞ Reserve list; ‡ Restricted list; § Suspended list; † Temporarily inactive list; Roster updated October 10, 2025; → More rosters: MiLB • Arizona Fall League

== See also ==
- Arizona Fall League#Results by season
