= Lists of stadiums =

The following are lists of stadiums throughout the world. Note that horse racing and motorsport venues are not included at some pages, because those are not stadiums but sports venues.

== Combined lists ==
- List of future stadiums
- List of indoor arenas
- List of national stadiums
- List of stadiums by capacity
- List of closed stadiums by capacity
- List of covered stadiums by capacity
- List of indoor arenas by capacity
- List of Olympic stadiums

== By continent or region ==
=== Africa ===
- List of indoor arenas in Africa
- List of stadiums in Africa
- List of African stadiums by capacity

=== Asia ===
- List of stadiums in Asia
- List of Asian stadiums by capacity
- List of East Asia stadiums by capacity
- List of Southeast Asia stadiums by capacity

=== Europe ===
- List of European ice hockey arenas
- List of indoor arenas in Europe
- List of indoor arenas in Nordic countries
- List of stadiums in Europe
- List of European stadiums by capacity
- List of stadiums in the Nordic countries by capacity

=== North America ===
- List of stadiums in Central America and the Caribbean
- List of North American stadiums by capacity

=== Oceania ===
- List of stadiums in Oceania
- List of Oceanian stadiums by capacity

=== South America ===
- List of stadiums in South America
- List of South American stadiums by capacity

== By sport or competition ==
=== Association football ===
- List of association football stadiums by capacity
- List of association football stadiums by country
- List of FIFA World Cup stadiums
- List of La Liga stadiums
- List of Major League Soccer stadiums
- List of Premier League stadiums
- List of Serie A stadiums

=== Athletics ===
- List of track and field stadiums by capacity

=== Australian football ===
- List of Australian Football League stadiums

=== Baseball ===
- List of baseball stadiums by capacity
- List of current Major League Baseball stadiums
- List of NCAA Division I baseball stadiums
- List of Nippon Professional Baseball stadiums
- List of Double-A baseball stadiums
- List of Triple-A baseball stadiums
- List of High-A baseball stadiums
- List of Single-A baseball stadiums
- List of American Association (1902–1997) stadiums
- List of Arizona Complex League stadiums
- List of Arizona Fall League stadiums
- List of California League stadiums
- List of Carolina League stadiums
- List of Major League Baseball spring training ballparks
- List of baseball stadiums in South Korea

=== Basketball ===
- List of basketball arenas
- List of EuroLeague arenas
- List of NBA arenas
- List of NCAA Division I basketball arenas

=== Bullfighting ===
- Bullrings

=== Cricket ===
- List of cricket stadiums by capacity
- List of cricket grounds in Australia
- List of cricket grounds in England and Wales
- List of cricket grounds in South Africa

=== Gaelic football and hurling ===
- List of Gaelic Athletic Association stadiums

=== Gridiron football ===
- List of American football stadiums by capacity
- List of Canadian Football League stadiums
- List of current NFL stadiums
- List of NCAA Division I FBS football stadiums
- List of NCAA Division I FCS football stadiums

=== Ice hockey ===
- List of ice hockey arenas by capacity
- List of Kontinental Hockey League arenas
- List of National Hockey League arenas

=== Lacrosse ===
- List of Major League Lacrosse stadiums

=== Rugby league ===
- List of National Rugby League stadiums
- List of Australian rugby league stadiums
- List of rugby league stadiums by capacity

=== Rugby union ===
- List of Australian rugby union stadiums by capacity
- List of English rugby union stadiums by capacity
- List of rugby union stadiums in France
- List of Super Rugby stadiums
- List of rugby union stadiums by capacity

=== Tennis ===
- List of tennis stadiums by capacity
- List of tennis stadiums by country

== By country ==
=== A ===
- List of cricket grounds in Afghanistan
- List of stadiums in Afghanistan
- List of stadiums in Albania
- List of football stadiums in Algeria
- List of indoor arenas in Algeria
- List of football stadiums in Angola
- List of football stadiums in Argentina
- List of indoor arenas in Argentina
- List of rugby union stadiums in Argentina
- List of football stadiums in Armenia
- List of football stadiums in Australia
- List of stadiums in Australia
- List of football stadiums in Austria
- List of indoor arenas in Austria
- List of football stadiums in Azerbaijan

=== B ===
- List of stadiums in the Bahamas
- List of football stadiums in Bahrain
- List of cricket stadiums in Bangladesh
- List of football stadiums in Bangladesh
- List of stadiums in Bangladesh
- List of stadiums in Barbados
- List of football stadiums in Belarus
- List of football stadiums in Belgium
- List of indoor arenas in Belgium
- List of football stadiums in Benin
- List of football stadiums in Bhutan
- List of football stadiums in Bolivia
- List of indoor stadiums in Bolivia
- List of football stadiums in Bosnia and Herzegovina
- List of football stadiums in Botswana
- List of football stadiums in Brazil
- List of indoor arenas in Brazil
- List of football stadiums in Brunei
- List of football stadiums in Bulgaria
- List of indoor arenas in Bulgaria
- List of football stadiums in Burkina Faso
- List of football stadiums in Burundi

=== C ===
- List of football stadiums in Cambodia
- List of football stadiums in Cameroon
- List of football stadiums in Canada
- List of indoor arenas in Canada
- List of stadiums in Canada
- List of football stadiums in Cape Verde
- List of football stadiums in the Central African Republic
- List of football stadiums in Chad
- List of football stadiums in Chile
- List of football stadiums in China
- List of indoor arenas in China
- List of stadiums in China
- List of football stadiums in Colombia
- List of football stadiums in the Comoros
- List of football stadiums in the Congo
- List of football stadiums in Costa Rica
- List of football stadiums in Ivory Coast
- List of football stadiums in Croatia
- List of indoor arenas in Croatia
- List of baseball stadiums in Cuba
- List of football stadiums in Cuba
- List of football stadiums in Curaçao
- List of football stadiums in Cyprus
- List of football stadiums in the Czech Republic
- List of indoor arenas in the Czech Republic

=== D ===
- List of football stadiums in the Democratic Republic of the Congo
- List of football stadiums in Denmark
- List of indoor arenas in Denmark
- List of football stadiums in Djibouti
- List of stadiums in the Dominican Republic

=== E ===
- List of football stadiums in Ecuador
- List of football stadiums in Egypt
- List of indoor arenas in Egypt
- List of football stadiums in El Salvador
- List of football stadiums in England
- List of stadiums in England
- List of football stadiums in Equatorial Guinea
- List of football stadiums in Eritrea
- List of football stadiums in Estonia
- List of stadiums in Eswatini
- List of football stadiums in Ethiopia

=== F ===
- List of football stadiums in the Faroe Islands
- List of football stadiums in Fiji
- List of football stadiums in Finland
- List of indoor arenas in Finland
- List of football stadiums in France
- List of indoor arenas in France
- List of rugby union stadiums in France
- List of football stadiums in French Guiana
- List of football stadiums in French Polynesia

=== G ===
- List of football stadiums in Gabon
- List of football stadiums in the Gambia
- List of football stadiums in Georgia
- List of football stadiums in Germany
- List of indoor arenas in Germany
- List of football stadiums in Ghana
- List of football stadiums in Greece
- List of indoor arenas in Greece
- List of football stadiums in Grenada
- List of football stadiums in Guadeloupe
- List of football stadiums in Guatemala
- List of football stadiums in Guinea
- List of football stadiums in Guinea-Bissau
- List of football stadiums in Guyana

=== H ===
- List of football stadiums in Haiti
- List of football stadiums in Honduras
- List of stadiums in Hong Kong
- List of football stadiums in Hungary

=== I ===
- List of football stadiums in Iceland
- List of cricket stadiums in India
- List of field hockey venues in India
- List of football stadiums in India
- List of indoor arenas in India
- List of stadiums in India
- List of football stadiums in Indonesia
- List of football stadiums in Iran
- List of football stadiums in Iraq
- List of football stadiums in Ireland
- List of stadiums in Ireland
- List of football stadiums in Israel
- List of indoor arenas in Israel
- List of football stadiums in Italy
- List of indoor arenas in Italy

=== J ===
- List of football stadiums in Jamaica
- List of indoor arenas in Japan
- List of football stadiums in Japan
- List of stadiums in Japan
- List of football stadiums in Jordan

=== K ===
- List of football stadiums in Kazakhstan
- List of football stadiums in Kenya
- List of rugby union stadiums in Kenya
- List of football stadiums in Kosovo
- List of football stadiums in Kuwait
- List of football stadiums in Kyrgyzstan

=== L ===
- List of football stadiums in Laos
- List of football stadiums in Latvia
- List of football stadiums in Lebanon
- List of football stadiums in Lesotho
- List of football stadiums in Liberia
- List of football stadiums in Libya
- List of football stadiums in Liechtenstein
- List of football stadiums in Lithuania
- List of indoor arenas in Lithuania
- List of football stadiums in Luxembourg

=== M ===
- List of football stadiums in Macau
- List of football stadiums in Madagascar
- List of football stadiums in Malawi
- List of stadiums in Malaysia
- List of football stadiums in the Maldives
- List of football stadiums in Mali
- List of football stadiums in Malta
- List of football stadiums in Martinique
- List of football stadiums in Mauritania
- List of football stadiums in Mauritius
- List of football stadiums in Mexico
- List of indoor arenas in Mexico
- List of stadiums in Mexico
- List of football stadiums in Moldova
- List of football stadiums in Monaco
- List of football stadiums in Mongolia
- List of football stadiums in Montenegro
- List of football stadiums in Morocco
- List of indoor arenas in Morocco
- List of football stadiums in Mozambique
- List of football stadiums in Myanmar

=== N ===
- List of football stadiums in Namibia
- List of rugby union stadiums in Namibia
- List of football stadiums in Nepal
- List of cricket Stadiums in Nepal
- List of football stadiums in the Netherlands
- List of indoor arenas in the Netherlands
- List of stadiums in New Zealand
- List of football stadiums in Nicaragua
- List of football stadiums in Niger
- List of stadiums in Nigeria
- List of football stadiums in Northern Cyprus
- List of football stadiums in Northern Ireland
- List of football stadiums in North Korea
- List of football stadiums in North Macedonia
- List of football stadiums in Norway
- List of indoor arenas in Norway

=== O–Q ===
- List of football stadiums in Oman
- List of cricket stadiums in Pakistan
- List of field hockey stadiums in Pakistan
- List of football stadiums in Pakistan
- List of stadiums in Pakistan
- List of football stadiums in Palestine
- List of football stadiums in Panama
- List of stadiums in Papua New Guinea
- List of football stadiums in Paraguay
- List of football stadiums in Peru
- List of baseball stadiums in the Philippines
- List of football stadiums in the Philippines
- List of indoor arenas in the Philippines
- List of football stadiums in Poland
- List of indoor arenas in Poland
- List of football stadiums in Portugal
- List of indoor arenas in Portugal
- List of football stadiums in Qatar

=== R ===
- List of football stadiums in Réunion
- List of football stadiums in Romania
- List of football stadiums in Russia
- List of indoor arenas in Russia
- List of football stadiums in Rwanda

=== S ===
- List of stadiums in Samoa
- List of football stadiums in San Marino
- List of football stadiums in São Tomé and Príncipe
- List of football stadiums in Saudi Arabia
- List of football stadiums in Scotland
- List of football stadiums in Senegal
- List of football stadiums in Serbia
- List of indoor arenas in Serbia
- List of football stadiums in Seychelles
- List of football stadiums in Sierra Leone
- List of stadiums in Singapore
- List of football stadiums in Slovakia
- List of football stadiums in Slovenia
- List of football stadiums on the Solomon Islands
- List of football stadiums in Somalia
- List of indoor arenas in South Africa
- List of football stadiums in South Africa
- List of stadiums in South Africa
- List of baseball stadiums in South Korea
- List of football stadiums in South Korea
- List of indoor arenas in South Korea
- List of football stadiums in South Sudan
- List of bullfighting stadiums in Spain
- List of indoor arenas in Spain
- List of football stadiums in Spain
- List of cricket stadiums in Sri Lanka
- List of football stadiums in Sri Lanka
- List of rugby union stadiums in Sri Lanka
- List of stadiums in St. Lucia
- List of football stadiums in St. Vincent and the Grenadines
- List of football stadiums in Sudan
- List of football stadiums in Suriname
- List of football stadiums in Sweden
- List of indoor arenas in Sweden
- List of football stadiums in Switzerland
- List of indoor arenas in Switzerland
- List of football stadiums in Syria

=== T ===
- List of stadiums in Taiwan
- List of football stadiums in Tajikistan
- List of football stadiums in Tanzania
- List of football stadiums in Thailand
- List of football stadiums in Timor-Leste
- List of football stadiums in Togo
- List of stadiums in Tonga
- List of football stadiums in Trinidad and Tobago
- List of football stadiums in Tunisia
- List of indoor arenas in Tunisia
- List of football stadiums in Turkey
- List of indoor arenas in Turkey
- List of football stadiums in Turkmenistan

=== U ===
- List of football stadiums in Uganda
- List of football stadiums in Ukraine
- List of football stadiums in the United Arab Emirates
- List of indoor arenas in the United Arab Emirates
- List of indoor arenas in the United Kingdom
- List of stadiums in the United Kingdom
- List of American football stadiums in the United States
- List of baseball stadiums in the United States
- List of indoor arenas in the United States
- List of football stadiums in the United States
- List of stadiums in the United States
- List of football stadiums in Uruguay
- List of football stadiums in Uzbekistan

=== V–Z ===
- List of football stadiums in Vanuatu
- List of baseball stadiums in Venezuela
- List of football stadiums in Venezuela
- List of stadiums in Venezuela
- List of football stadiums in Vietnam
- List of stadiums in Wales
- List of football stadiums in Yemen
- List of football stadiums in Zambia
- List of cricket stadiums in Zimbabwe
- List of stadiums in Zimbabwe

== See also ==
- List of sports venues with a highest attendance of 100,000 or more
- List of attendance figures at domestic professional sports leagues
- List of professional sports leagues by revenue
- Forbes list of the most valuable football clubs
- List of sports venues named after individuals
- List of motor racing venues by capacity
- List of horse racing venues by capacity
- List of motor racing venues by country
- List of horse racing venues by country
- List of world champion football clubs
- List of contemporary amphitheatres
- List of Formula One racing venues
- List of sports venues by capacity
- List of sports attendance figures
- Lists of buildings and structures
- List of NASCAR racing venues
- List of music venues
