= List of football stadiums in Botswana =

The following is a list of football stadiums in Botswana, ordered by capacity.

== Current stadiums ==
#	Image	Stadium	Capacity	City	District	Home team(s)
1		Obed Itani Chilume Stadium	27,000	Francistown	North-East	ECCO City Green, TAFIC F.C.
2		Botswana National Stadium	25,000	Gaborone	South-East	Botswana national football team, Township Rollers F.C.
3		New Lobatse Stadium	20,000	Lobatse	South-East	Extension Gunners
4		Jamali Stadium	10,000	Tlokweng	South-East	Township Rollers
5		Maun Stadium	10,000	Maun	North-West	Sankoyo Bush Bucks F.C.
6		Phikwe Stadium	9,000	Selebi-Phikwe	Central	F.C. Satmos, BCL Nico United S.C.
7		University of Botswana Stadium	8,500	Gaborone	South-East	
8		Molepolole Stadium	6,600	Molepolole	Kweneng	Police XI S.C., Gaborone United, Mochudi Centre Chiefs S.C.
9		Serowe Stadium	6,000	Serowe	Central	Green Lovers FC, Miscellaneous SC Serowe, Motlakase Power Dynamos
10		Itekeng Stadium	5,000	Orapa	Central	Orapa United FC
11		Masunga Stadium	5,000	Masunga	North-East	
12		SSKB Stadium	5,000	Gaborone	South-East	Botswana Defence Force XI FC
13		Botswana Police College Stadium	1,500		South-East	

== See also ==
- List of association football stadiums by capacity
- List of African stadiums by capacity
- Lists of stadiums
