= List of football stadiums in Latvia =

The following is a list of association football stadiums in Latvia, ranked in order of capacity, with the minimum capacity being 1,000. The largest stadium in the country is currently the Daugava Stadium, first opened in 1972, which can hold up to 10,461 people.

== Current stadiums ==
#	Image	Stadium	Capacity	City	Home team	UEFA rank
1		Daugava Stadium	10,461	Riga	Latvia national football team, FK Metta	4/4 stars
2		Skonto Stadium	8,087	Riga	Latvia national football team, Riga FC	3/4 stars
3		Daugava Stadium (Liepāja)	4,002	Liepāja	FK Liepāja	
4		Ventspils Olimpiskais Stadions	3,200	Ventspils	FK Ventspils	
5		Sloka Stadium	2,500	Jūrmala	FK Spartaks Jūrmala	
6		Celtnieks Stadium	1,980	Daugavpils	BFC Daugavpils	
7		LNK Sporta Parks	1,700	Riga	FK RFS	
8		Zemgale Olympic Center	1,560	Jelgava	FS Jelgava	
9		Gulbenes Sporta Centrs	1,500	Gulbene	FB Gulbene	
10		Jānis Daliņš Stadium	1,250	Valmiera	Valmiera FC	
11		Jēkabpils Stadium	1,111	Jēkabpils	FK Jēkabpils	
12		Valmieras Olimpiskais Centrs	1,108	Valmiera	Valmiera FC	
13		Tukuma Pilsētas Stadions	1,000	Tukums	FK Tukums 2000	

== See also ==
- List of European stadiums by capacity
- List of association football stadiums by capacity
- Lists of stadiums
