= List of Serie A stadiums =

Since the inception of the Serie A, Italy's highest level of association football annual league tournament, 84 football stadiums have been used to host matches. The inaugural round of Serie A matches took place on 6 October 1929 with 18 clubs hosting the opening fixtures.

== Stadiums ==
Stadiums listed in bold indicate that they are the home grounds of teams participating in the 2026–27 Serie A season, while those stadiums listed in italics have now been demolished. Clubs in parentheses no longer share the stadium.

Stadium	Image	Club	Location	Opened	Closed	Capacity
Arena Garibaldi – Stadio Romeo Anconetani		Pisa	Pisa	1919		25,000
Campo degli Sports		Bari	Bari	1925	1967	10,000
Campo Testaccio		Roma	Rome	1914	1940	20,000
**Juventus Stadium**		Juventus	Turin	2011		41,507
**Mapei Stadium – Città del Tricolore**		Sassuolo and Reggiana	Reggio Emilia	1995		23,717
**San Siro** also known as the Stadio Giuseppe Meazza		Milan and Internazionale	Milan	1926		80,018
**Unipol Domus**		Cagliari	Cagliari	2017		16,233
Stadio Adriatico – Giovanni Cornacchia		Pescara	Pescara	1955		20,515
Stadio Alberto Braglia		(Carpi) and Modena	Modena	1936		21,092
Stadio Alberto Picco		Spezia	La Spezia	1919		10,336
Stadio delle Alpi		Juventus and Torino	Turin	1990	2006	69,295
Stadio Amsicora		Cagliari	Cagliari	1923	1970	29,000
Stadio Angelo Massimino		Catania	Catania	1937		23,266
Stadio Arechi		Salernitana	Salerno	1990		31,300
Stadio Armando Picchi		Livorno	Livorno	1935		19,238
**Stadio Artemio Franchi**		Fiorentina	Florence	1931		43,147
Stadio Artemio Franchi – Montepaschi Arena		Siena	Siena	1923		15,373
Stadio Arturo Collana		Napoli	Naples	1929	1959	12,000
**Stadio Benito Stirpe**		Frosinone	Frosinone	2017		16,227
**Stadio Brianteo**		Monza	Monza	1988		15,039
Stadio Carlo Castellani		Empoli	Empoli	1923		21,092
Stadio Carlo Speroni		Pro Patria	Busto Arsizio	1927		5,000
Stadio Cino e Lillo Del Duca		Ascoli	Ascoli	1962		20,550
Stadio Ciro Vigorito		Benevento	Benevento	1979		25,554
Stadio del Conero		Ancona	Ancona	1992		23,967
**Stadio di Bergamo**		Atalanta	Bergamo	1928		26,562
Stadio di Corso Marsiglia		Juventus	Turin	1922	1933	15,000
Stadio di Corso Sebastopoli		Juventus	Turin	1908	1922	10,000
Stadio Danilo Martelli		Mantova	Mantua	1949		17,844
**Stadio Diego Armando Maradona**		Napoli	Naples	1959		54,726
Stadio Dino Manuzzi		Cesena	Cesena	1957		23,860
Stadio Donato Vestuti		Salernitana	Salerno	1931	1990	9,000
**Stadio Ennio Tardini**		Parma	Parma	1923		27,906
Stadio Enrico Patti		Novara	Novara	1931	1976	2,030
Stadio Euganeo		Padova	Padova	1994		32,420
Stadio Filadelfia		Torino	Turin	1926	1963	4,000
Stadio Franco Ossola		Varese	Varese	1925		8,213
**Stadio Friuli**		Udinese	Udine	1976		25,144
Stadio Giovanni Celeste		Messina	Messina	1932	2004	12,000
Stadio Giovanni Mari		Legnano	Legnano	1921		5,000
Stadio Giovanni Zini		Cremonese	Cremona	1929		20,641
Stadio Giuseppe Grezar		Triestina	Triestina	1932	1992	8,000
Stadio Giuseppe Moccagatta		Alessandria	Alessandria	1929		8,000
**Stadio Giuseppe Sinigaglia**		Como	Como	1927		13,602
Stadio Is Arenas		(Cagliari)	Quartu Sant'Elena	2012		16,500
Stadio Leonardo Garilli		Piacenza	Piacenza	1969		21,668
Stadio Libero Liberati		Ternana	Terni	1969		17,460
Stadio del Littorio		Liguria and Sampierdarenese	Genoa	1928	1958	15,000
**Stadio Luigi Ferraris**		Genoa and Sampdoria	Genoa	1911		36,559
Stadio Marc'Antonio Bentegodi (1906–1963)		Hellas Verona	Verona	1906	1963	5,000
Stadio Marc'Antonio Bentegodi (1963–)		Chievo and Hellas Verona	Verona	1963		39,371
Stadio Marcello Melani		Pistoiese	Pistoia	1965		13,195
Stadio Mario Rigamonti		Brescia	Brescia	1959		16,743
Stadio Matusa		Frosinone	Frosinone	1932	2017	9,680
Stadio Militare dell'Arenaccia		Napoli	Naples	1923	1959	3,000
Stadio Mirabello		Reggiana	Reggio Emilia	1910	2005	15,500
Stadio Moretti		Udinese	Udine	1920	1976	25,000
Stadio Motovelodromo Umberto I		Juventus and Torino	Turin	1895	1917	15,000
Stadio Natale Palli		Casale	Casale Monferrato	1921		5,600
Stadio Nazionale PNF		Roma and Lazio	Rome	1911	1953	47,300
Stadio Nereo Rocco		(Cagliari)	Trieste	1992		21,000
Stadio Nicola Ceravolo		Catanzaro	Catanzaro	1919		14,650
**Stadio Olimpico**		Roma and Lazio	Rome	1937		70,634
**Stadio Olimpico Grande Torino**		(Juventus) and Torino	Turin	1933		27,958
Stadio Omobono Tenni		Treviso	Treviso	1933		10,000
Stadio Oreste Granillo		Reggina	Reggina	1999		27,543
Stadio Paolo Mazza		SPAL	Ferrara	1928		13,135
Stadio Partenopeo		Napoli	Naples	1934	1942	40,000
Stadio Partenio-Adriano Lombardi		Avellino	Avellino	1973		26,000
**Stadio Pier Luigi Penzo**		Venezia	Venezia	1913		7,450
Stadio Pino Zaccheria		Foggia	Foggia	1925		25,085
Stadio Porta Elisa		Lucchese	Lucca	1935		7,386
Stadio Renato Curi		Perugia	Perugia	1975		23,625
**Stadio Renato Dall'Ara**		Bologna	Bologna	1927		38,279
Stadio Renzo Barbera		Palermo	Palermo	1932		36,349
Stadio Rigamonti-Ceppi		Lecco	Lecco	1922		4,997
Stadio Romeo Menti		Vicenza	Vicenza	1935		12,000
Stadio della Rondinella		Roma and Lazio	Rome	1914	1957	15,000
Stadio Sant'Elia		Cagliari	Cagliari	1970	2019	16,233
Stadio San Filippo		Messina	Messina	2004		38,722
Stadio San Nicola		Bari	Bari	1990		58,270
Stadio Silvio Appiani		Padova	Padova	1924	1994	24,000
Stadio Silvio Piola		Novara	Novara	1976		17,875
Stadio Silvio Piola		Pro Vercelli	Vercelli	1932		5,500
**Stadio Via del Mare**		Lecce	Lecce	1966		40,670
Stadio della Vittoria		Bari	Bari	1934	1990	19,253
Stadium di Viale Piave		Brescia	Brescia	1921	1959	2,500

== See also ==
- Lists of stadiums
