= List of EuroLeague arenas =

The following list includes current and some of the former arenas that have been used by the teams that have played in the EuroLeague. Other information included in this list are: arena locations, seating capacities and years opened.

== Current arenas ==
Season 2025–26

Image	Arena	Location	Team(s)	Capacity	Opened
	Telekom Center Athens	Athens, Greece	Panathinaikos Athens	18,989	1995
	Belgrade Arena	Belgrade, Serbia	Partizan Belgrade; Crvena zvezda Belgrade	18,386	2004
	Movistar Arena	Madrid, Spain	Real Madrid	17,453	2005
	Fernando Buesa Arena	Vitoria-Gasteiz, Spain	Kosner Baskonia Vitoria-Gasteiz	15,504	1991
	Žalgiris Arena	Kaunas, Lithuania	Žalgiris Kaunas	15,415	2011
	Ülker Sports and Event Hall	Istanbul, Turkey	Fenerbahçe Beko	13,800	2012
	Mediolanum Forum	Assago, Milan, Italy	EA7 Emporio Armani Milan	12,700	1990
	Peace and Friendship Stadium	Piraeus, Greece	Olympiacos Piraeus	11,640	1985
	Menora Mivtachim Arena	Tel Aviv, Israel	Maccabi Tel Aviv	10,383	1963
	Virtus Arena	Bologna, Italy	Virtus Bologna	9,980	2019
	Aleksandar Nikolić Hall	Belgrade, Serbia	Crvena zvezda Belgrade; Partizan Belgrade; Maccabi Tel Aviv	8,178	1973
	Palau Blaugrana	Barcelona, Spain	FC Barcelona	7,585	1971
	SAP Garden	Munich, Germany	Bayern Munich	12,500	2024
	LDLC Arena	Villeurbanne, France	LDLC ASVEL	12,000	2023
	Salle Gaston Médecin	Fontvieille, Monaco	Monaco Basket	4,700	1985
	Basketball Development Center	Istanbul, Turkey	Anadolu Efes	10,000	2024
	Coca-Cola Arena	Dubai, United Arab Emirates	Dubai Basketball	13,221	2019
	Allianz Cloud Arena	Milan, Italy	EA7 Emporio Armani Milan	5,420	1961
	Arena 8888 Sofia	Sofia, Bulgaria	Hapoel Tel Aviv	12,373	2011
	Arena Botevgrad	Botevgrad, Bulgaria	Hapoel Tel Aviv	4,500	2014
	Astroballe	Villeurbanne, France	LDLC ASVEL	5,556	1995
	Adidas Arena	Paris, France	Paris Basketball	8,000	2024
	Accor Arena	Paris, France	Paris Basketball	15,705	1984
	Roig Arena	Valencia, Spain	Valencia Basket	15,600	2025
	PalaDozza	Bologna, Italy	Virtus Bologna	5,570	1956
	Juan Antonio Samaranch Olympic Hall	Sarajevo, Bosnia and Herzegovina	Dubai Basketball	12,000	1982

== Previous seasons ==
Image	Arena	Location	Team(s)	Capacity	Opened
	Megasport Arena	Moscow, Russia	CSKA Moscow	12,824	2006
	Sibur Arena	Saint Petersburg, Russia	Zenit Saint Petersburg	7,120	2013
	Basket-Hall Kazan	Kazan, Russia	UNICS Kazan	7,482	2003
	Gran Canaria Arena	Las Palmas, Spain	Gran Canaria	12,470	2014
	Volkswagen Arena (Istanbul)	Istanbul, Turkey	Darüşşafaka	5,240	2014
	Morača Sports Center	Podgorica, Montenegro	Budućnost	6,000	1978
	Palacio de Deportes José María Martín Carpena	Málaga, Spain	Unicaja	11,000	1999
	Brose Arena	Bamberg, Germany	Brose Baskets Bamberg	6,249	2001
	Abdi İpekçi Arena	Istanbul, Turkey	Galatasaray; Anadolu Efes	12,270	1979
	Basket-Hall Krasnodar	Krasnodar, Russia	Lokomotiv-Kuban	7,500	2011
	Rhénus Sport	Strasbourg, France	Strasbourg IG	6,200	1974
	Dražen Petrović Basketball Hall	Zagreb, Croatia	Cedevita	5,400	1987
	Beaublanc	Limoges, France	Limoges	6,500	1981
	Karşıyaka Arena	İzmir, Turkey	Karşıyaka	6,500	2005
	CRS Hall Zielona Góra	Zielona Góra, Poland	Basket Zielona Góra	6,080	2010
	Palasport Roberta Serradimigni	Sassari, Italy	Dinamo Sassari	5,000	1981
	Trade Union Sport Palace	Nizhny Novgorod, Russia	Nizhny Novgorod	5,500	1965
	Švyturys Arena	Klaipėda, Lithuania	Neptūnas	6,200	2011
	Halle Georges Carpentier	Paris, France	JSF Nanterre	5,009	1960
	Palace of Sports, Kyiv	Kyiv, Ukraine	Budivelnyk Kyiv	7,000	1960
	Palasport Mens Sana	Siena, Italy	Montepaschi Siena	7,050	1976
	Siemens Arena	Vilnius, Lithuania	Lietuvos rytas	11,000	2004
	Sinan Erdem Dome	Istanbul, Turkey	Anadolu Efes	16,000	2010
	Mercedes-Benz Arena	Berlin, Germany	Alba Berlin	14,500	2008
	La Fonteta	Valencia, Spain	Valencia Basket	9,000	1983

== See also ==
- Lists of stadiums
