= List of football stadiums in Ecuador =

The following is a list of football stadiums in Ecuador, ordered by capacity. The largest stadium in Ecuador which is not used for football is the 15,000-capacity Plaza de toros de Quito.

== Current stadiums ==
#	Image	Stadium	Capacity	City	Home team(s)
1		Estadio Monumental Isidro Romero Carbo	59,283	Guayaquil	Barcelona S.C.
2		Estadio Modelo Alberto Spencer Herrera	42,000	Guayaquil	9 de Octubre F.C., C.S. Patria, C.D. Everest, Rocafuerte F.C., Panamá S.C.
3		Estadio Rodrigo Paz Delgado	41,575	Quito	Ecuador national football team, L.D.U. Quito
4		Estadio George Capwell	40,020	Guayaquil	C.S. Emelec
5		Estadio Olímpico Atahualpa	35,742	Quito	América de Quito, S.D. Quito, C.D. El Nacional, C.D. Universidad Católica del Ecuador
6		Estadio Reales Tamarindos	21,000	Portoviejo	L.D.U. Portoviejo
7		Estadio Jocay	20,000	Manta	Delfín S.C.
8		Estadio Gonzalo Pozo Ripalda	18,799	Quito	S.D. Aucas
9		Estadio Olímpico de Ibarra	18,600	Ibarra	Imbabura S.C.
10		Estadio Alejandro Serrano Aguilar	16,540	Cuenca	C.D. Cuenca, L.D.U. Cuenca
11		Estadio 9 de Mayo	16,500	Machala	C.D. Audaz Octubrino, Fuerza Amarilla S.C.
12		Estadio Bellavista	16,467	Ambato	Mushuc Runa S.C., C.S.D. Macará, C.D. Técnico Universitario
13		Estadio 7 de Octubre	15,200	Quevedo	C.D. Quevedo
14		Estadio La Cocha	15,200	Latacunga	S.D. Flamengo, C.D. Universidad Técnica de Cotopaxi
15		Estadio Federativo Reina del Cisne	14,935	Loja	L.D.U. Loja
16		Estadio Folke Anderson	14,000	Esmeraldas	C.D. Esmeraldas Petrolero, C.S.D. Juventus
17		Estadio Jorge Andrade	14,000	Azogues	Deportivo Azogues
18		Estadio Olímpico de Riobamba	14,000	Riobamba	C.D. Olmedo
19		Estadio Guillermo Albornoz	12,000	Cayambe	Cuniburo F.C.
20		Estadio Banco Guayaquil	12,000	Quito	C.S.D. Independiente del Valle
21		Estadio Etho Vega	10,172	Santo Domingo	C.D. ESPOLI
22		Estadio Christian Benítez Betancourt	10,152	Guayaquil	Guayaquil City F.C.
23		Estadio Rumiñahui	8,000	Quito	C.S.D. Independiente del Valle
24		Estadio Federativo	3,400	Azogues	C.D. Federativo

== See also ==
- List of South American stadiums by capacity
- List of association football stadiums by capacity
- List of association football stadiums by country
- List of sports venues by capacity
- List of stadiums by capacity
- Lists of stadiums
