= List of football stadiums in Sierra Leone =

The following is a list of football stadiums in Sierra Leone, ordered by capacity.

== Current stadiums ==
#	Image	Stadium	Capacity	City	Home team(s)
1		Siaka Stevens National Stadium	45,000	Freetown	Sierra Leone national football team East End Lions; Kallon; Mighty Blackpool; Old Edwardians; Ports Authority
2		Wusum Sports Stadium	5,000	Makeni	Wusum Stars
3		Bo Stadium	4,000	Bo	Bo Rangers; Nepean Stars
4		Koidu Sports Stadium	2,000	Koidu	Diamond Stars

== See also ==
- List of African stadiums by capacity
- List of association football stadiums by capacity
- Lists of stadiums
