= List of football stadiums in Jordan =

The following is a list of football stadiums in Jordan, ordered by capacity.

== Current stadiums ==
#	Image	Stadium	Capacity	City	Home team	Sport	Opened	Ref
1		Amman International Stadium	17,619	Amman	Jordan national football team, Al-Faisaly SC	Football	1968	
2		King Abdullah II Stadium	13,265	Amman	Jordan national football team, Al-Wehdat SC, Shabab Al-Hussein SC, Shabab Al-Ordon Club, Al-Yarmouk FC	Football	1999	
3		Al-Hassan Stadium	12,301	Irbid	Jordan women's national football team, Al-Hussein SC	Football	1990	
4		Prince Mohammed Stadium	11,402	Zarqa	Jordan national football team, Jordan women's national football team, Ittihad Al-Zarqa	Football	1999	
5		Prince Faisal Stadium	7,000	Al Karak	That Ras Club	Football		
6		Petra Stadium	6,000	Amman	Al-Ahli SC, Al-Jazeera Club, Jordan U-20	Football	1980	
7		Prince Hashim Stadium	5,000	Ar Ramtha	Al-Ramtha SC, Ittihad Al-Ramtha, Al-Sheikh Hussein FC, Kufrsoum SC	Football		
8		Prince Ali Stadium	3,500	Mafraq	Mansheyat Bani Hasan	Football		
9		Polo Stadium	2,000	Amman	Jordan women's national football team, Jordan Women's Pro League	Football	2013	
10		Ajloun Stadium	2,000	Ajloun		Football		
11		Prince Hamza Bin Al Hussein Stadium	1,500	Aqaba	Shabab Al-Aqaba Club	Football		
12		Al-Helalia Stadium	1,000	Mushayrifah		Football		
13		Al-Salt Stadium	1,000	Al-Salt	Al-Salt SC	Football		
14		Kana'an Ezzat Stadium	1,000	Zarqa		Football		

== See also ==
- List of Asian stadiums by capacity
- List of association football stadiums by capacity
- Lists of stadiums
