= List of stadiums in Hong Kong =

This is a list of stadiums and indoor stadiums in Hong Kong. Stadiums with a capacity of at least 1,000 are included.

== Current stadiums ==
Image	Stadium	Capacity	City	Home team	Opened	Ref.
	Aberdeen Sports Ground	9,000	Aberdeen	Southern District RSA	1971	
	Hammer Hill Sports Ground	2,200	Diamond Hill	Wong Tai Sin DRSC	1989	
	Hong Kong Coliseum	12,500	Hung Hom		1983	
	Hong Kong Stadium	40,000	So Kon Po	Hong Kong national football team, Hong Kong Pegasus FC	1953	
	Hong Kong Football Club Stadium	1,500	Happy Valley	Hong Kong Football Club	1981	
	Kai Tak Stadium	50,000	Kowloon	Hong Kong national football team	2025	
	Kowloon Bay Sports Ground	1,200	Kowloon Bay		n/a	
	Kowloon Cricket Club Ground	4,500	Kowloon	Hong Kong national cricket team	1904	
	Kwai Chung Sports Ground	1,500	Kwai Chung	Kwai Tsing District FC	n/a	
	Ma On Shan Sports Ground	1,387	Ma On Shan		1999	
	Mong Kok Stadium	6,769	Mong Kok	Kitchee SC, Eastern SC, Hong Kong National Football Team	1999	
	Mission Road Ground	3,500	Mong Kok	Hong Kong national cricket team	1976	
	North District Sports Ground	2,500	Sheung Shui	North District FC	1992	
	Queen Elizabeth Stadium	3,500	Wan Chai		1961	
	Sai Kung Tang Shiu Kin Sports Ground	3,000	Sai Kung	Sai Kung Stingrays Mini Rugby Club	n/a	
	Sha Tin Sports Ground	5,000	Sha Tin	Shatin Sports Association	1984	
	Sham Shui Po Sports Ground	2,194	Cheung Sha Wan	Biu Chun Rangers, Hoi King SA	1988	
	Shing Mun Valley Sports Ground	5,000	Tsuen Wan		1988	
	Siu Sai Wan Sports Ground	12,000	Siu Sai Wan		1996	
	South China Stadium	1,000	Hong Kong	South China Athletic Association	1953	
	Tai Po Sports Ground	3,500	Tai Po	Tai Po FC	1992	
	Tin Shui Wai Sports Ground	2,500	Tai Po		1992	
	Tseung Kwan O Sports Ground	3,500	Tseung Kwan O	Lee Man FC	2009	
	Tseung Kwan O Velodrome	3,000	Tseung Kwan O	Hong Kong Cycling Association	2013	
	Tsing Yi Sports Ground	1,500	Tsing Yi	Dreams FC	1996	
	Tuen Mun Tang Shiu Kin Sports Ground	2,200	Tuen Mun	Tuen Mun SA	1996	
	Wan Chai Sports Ground	2,000	Wan Chai North		n/a	
	Yuen Long Stadium	5,000	Yuen Long	Yuen Long FC	1969	

== See also ==
- Lists of stadiums
