= List of Triple-A baseball stadiums =

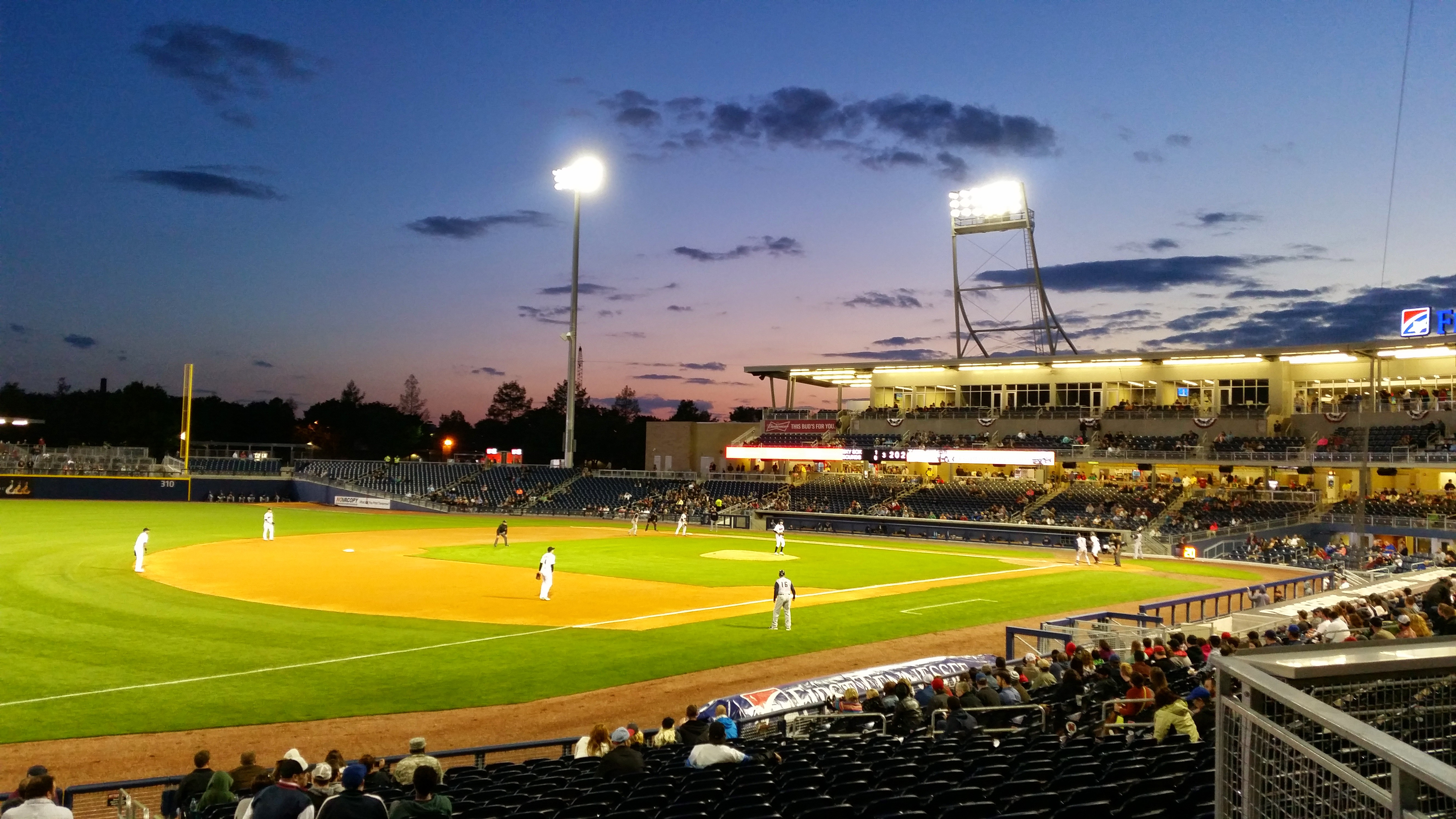
First Horizon Park, one of the newest stadiums in Triple-A, opened in 2015. It is the home of the International League's Nashville Sounds.

There are 30 stadiums in use by Triple-A Minor League Baseball teams, which are the top affiliates of Major League Baseball clubs. The International League (IL) uses 20 stadiums, and the Pacific Coast League (PCL) uses 10. The oldest stadium among these teams is Cheney Stadium, home of the PCL's Tacoma Rainiers, which opened in 1960. The newest stadium is The Ballpark at America First Square, home of the PCL's Salt Lake Bees, which opened in 2025. One stadium was built in the 1960s, two in the 1980s, seven in the 1990s, eleven in the 2000s, seven in the 2010s, and two in the 2020s. The highest seating capacity of all active Triple-A teams is 16,600 at Sahlen Field, where the IL's Buffalo Bisons play. The stadium with the lowest capacity is Tacoma's Cheney Stadium, which seats 6,500. All stadiums use a grass surface.

== Stadiums ==
=== International League ===
| Name | Team | City | State | Opened | Capacity | Ref. |
|---|---|---|---|---|---|---|
| AutoZone Park | Memphis Redbirds | Memphis | Tennessee | 2000 | 10,000 | |
| CHS Field | St. Paul Saints | Saint Paul | Minnesota | 2015 | 7,210 | |
| Coca-Cola Park | Lehigh Valley IronPigs | Allentown | Pennsylvania | 2008 | 10,100 | |
| Durham Bulls Athletic Park | Durham Bulls | Durham | North Carolina | 1995 | 10,000 | |
| ESL Ballpark | Rochester Red Wings | Rochester | New York | 1997 | 10,840 | |
| Fifth Third Field | Toledo Mud Hens | Toledo | Ohio | 2002 | 10,300 | |
| First Horizon Park | Nashville Sounds | Nashville | Tennessee | 2015 | 10,000 | |
| Gwinnett Field | Gwinnett Stripers | Lawrenceville | Georgia | 2009 | 10,427 | |
| Harbor Park | Norfolk Tides | Norfolk | Virginia | 1993 | 11,856 | |
| Huntington Park | Columbus Clippers | Columbus | Ohio | 2009 | 10,100 | |
| Louisville Slugger Field | Louisville Bats | Louisville | Kentucky | 2000 | 13,131 | |
| NBT Bank Stadium | Syracuse Mets | Syracuse | New York | 1997 | 10,815 | |
| PNC Field | Scranton/Wilkes-Barre RailRiders | Moosic | Pennsylvania | 1989 | 10,000 | |
| Polar Park | Worcester Red Sox | Worcester | Massachusetts | 2021 | 9,508 | |
| Principal Park | Iowa Cubs | Des Moines | Iowa | 1992 | 11,500 | |
| Sahlen Field | Buffalo Bisons | Buffalo | New York | 1988 | 16,600 | |
| Truist Field | Charlotte Knights | Charlotte | North Carolina | 2014 | 10,200 | |
| Victory Field | Indianapolis Indians | Indianapolis | Indiana | 1996 | 13,750 | |
| VyStar Ballpark | Jacksonville Jumbo Shrimp | Jacksonville | Florida | 2003 | 11,000 | |
| Werner Park | Omaha Storm Chasers | Papillon | Nebraska | 2011 | 9,023 | |

=== Pacific Coast League ===
| Name | Team | City | State | Opened | Capacity | Ref. |
|---|---|---|---|---|---|---|
| Cheney Stadium | Tacoma Rainiers | Tacoma | Washington | 1960 | 6,500 | |
| Chickasaw Bricktown Ballpark | Oklahoma City Comets | Oklahoma City | Oklahoma | 1998 | 9,000 | |
| Constellation Field | Sugar Land Space Cowboys | Sugar Land | Texas | 2012 | 7,500 | |
| The Ballpark at America First Square | Salt Lake Bees | South Jordan | Utah | 2025 | 8,500 | |
| Dell Diamond | Round Rock Express | Round Rock | Texas | 2000 | 11,631 | |
| Greater Nevada Field | Reno Aces | Reno | Nevada | 2009 | 9,013 | |
| Las Vegas Ballpark | Las Vegas Aviators | Las Vegas | Nevada | 2019 | 10,000 | |
| Rio Grande Credit Union Field at Isotopes Park | Albuquerque Isotopes | Albuquerque | New Mexico | 2003 | 13,500 | |
| Southwest University Park | El Paso Chihuahuas | El Paso | Texas | 2014 | 9,500 | |
| Sutter Health Park | Sacramento River Cats | Sacramento | California | 2000 | 14,014 | |

== Map ==
Current Triple-A stadium locations:
- International League
- Pacific Coast League

== Gallery ==
=== International League ===
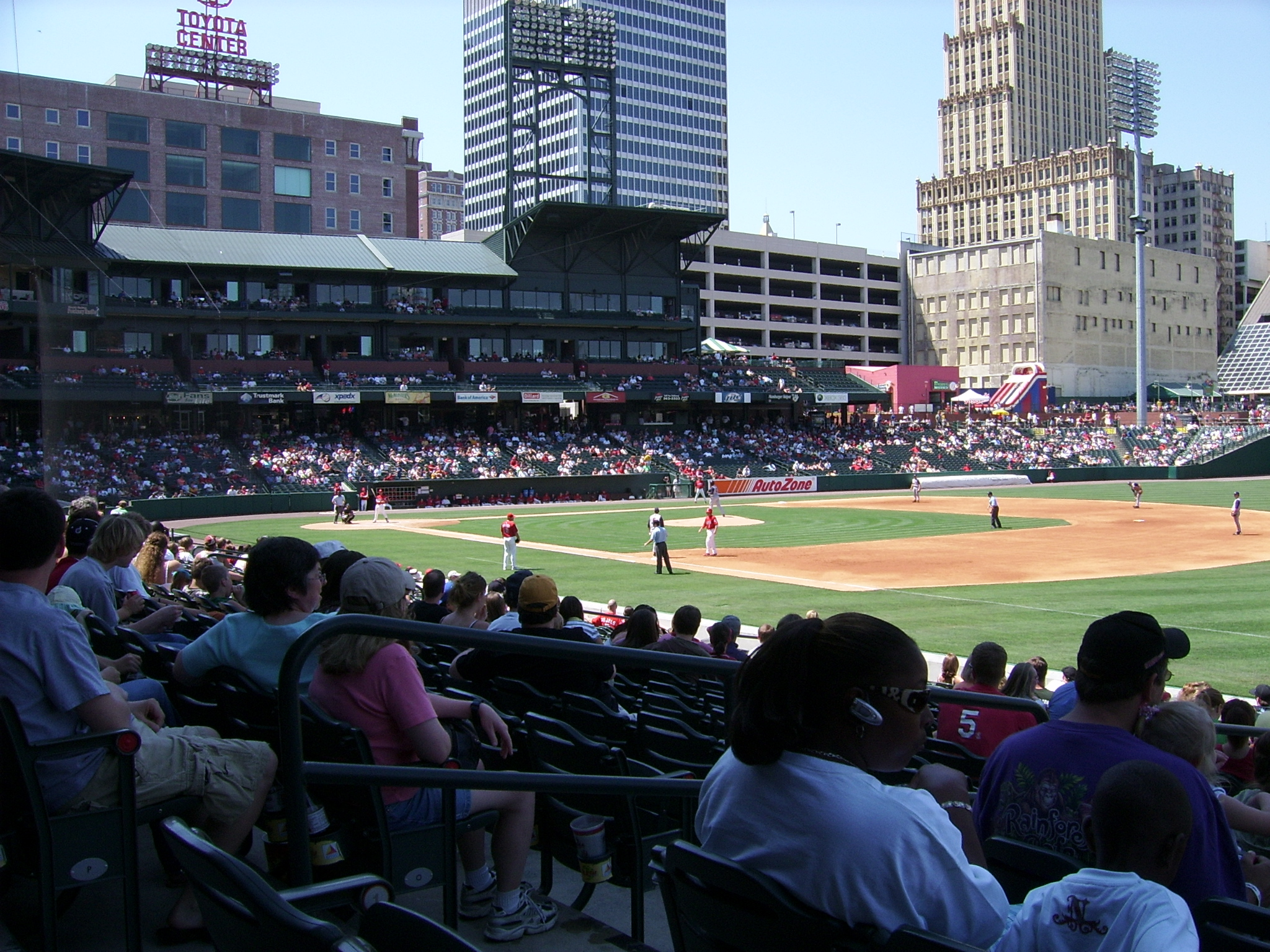
AutoZone Park (Memphis Redbirds)

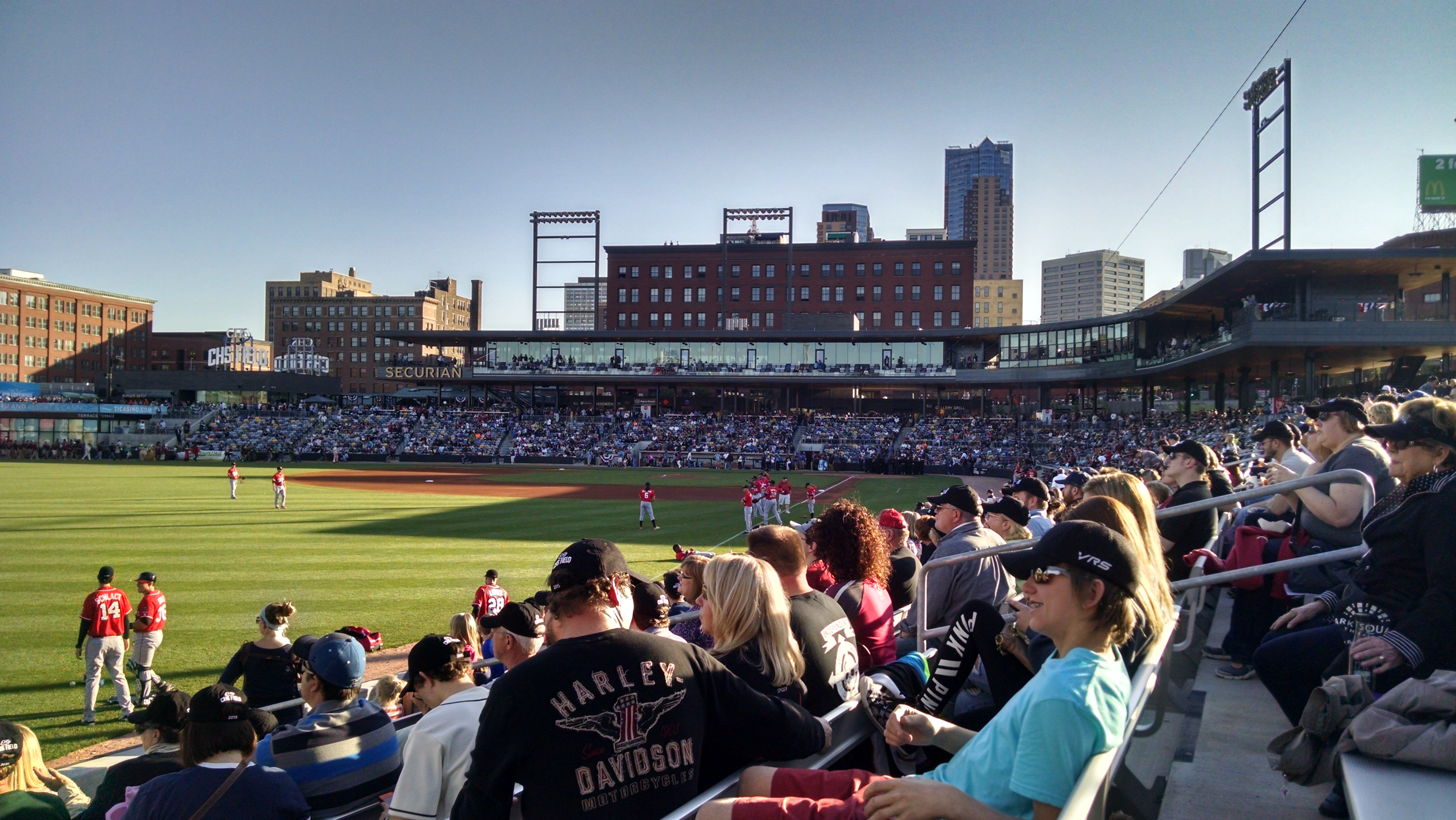
CHS Field (St. Paul Saints)

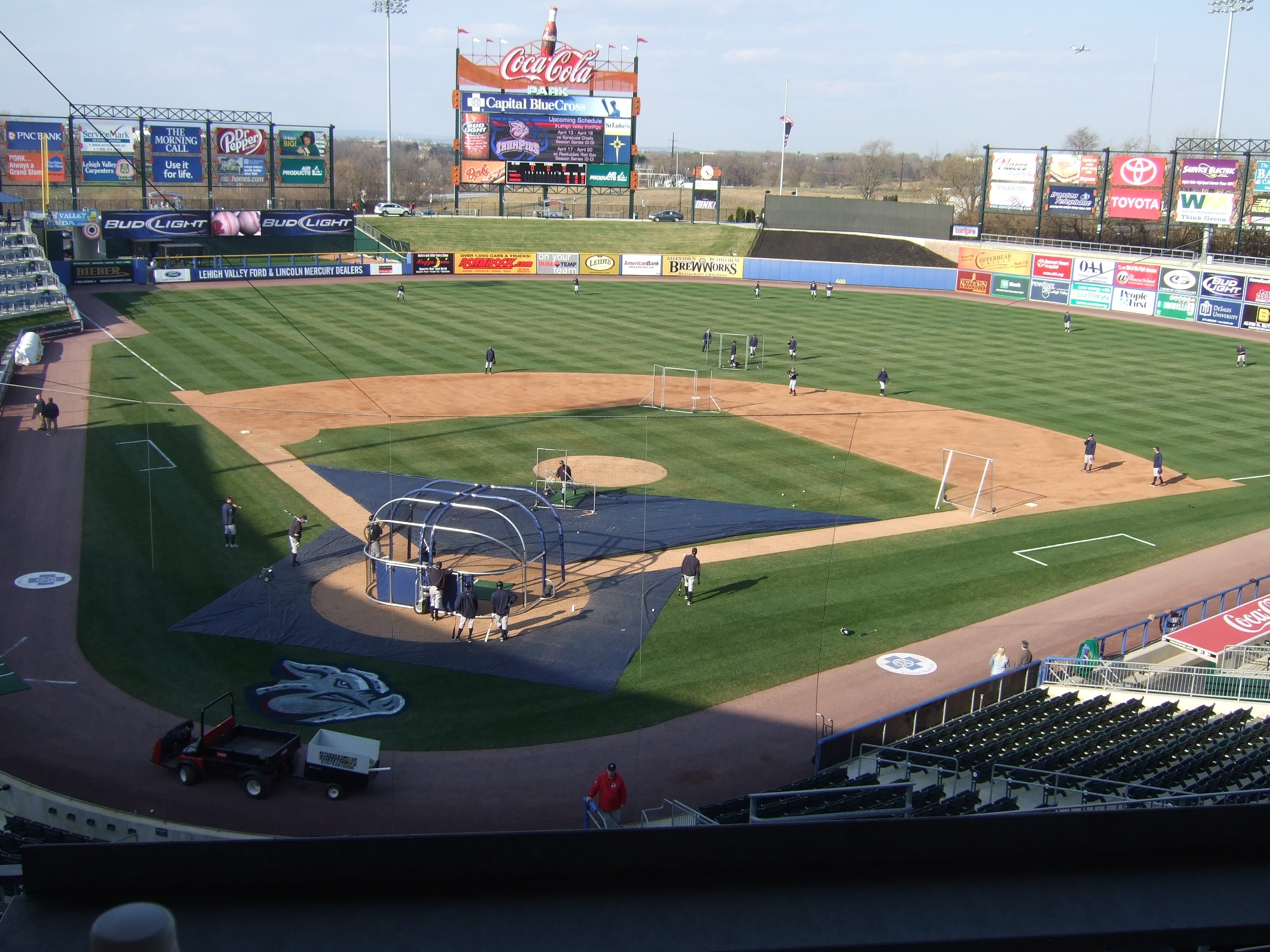
Coca-Cola Park (Lehigh Valley IronPigs)

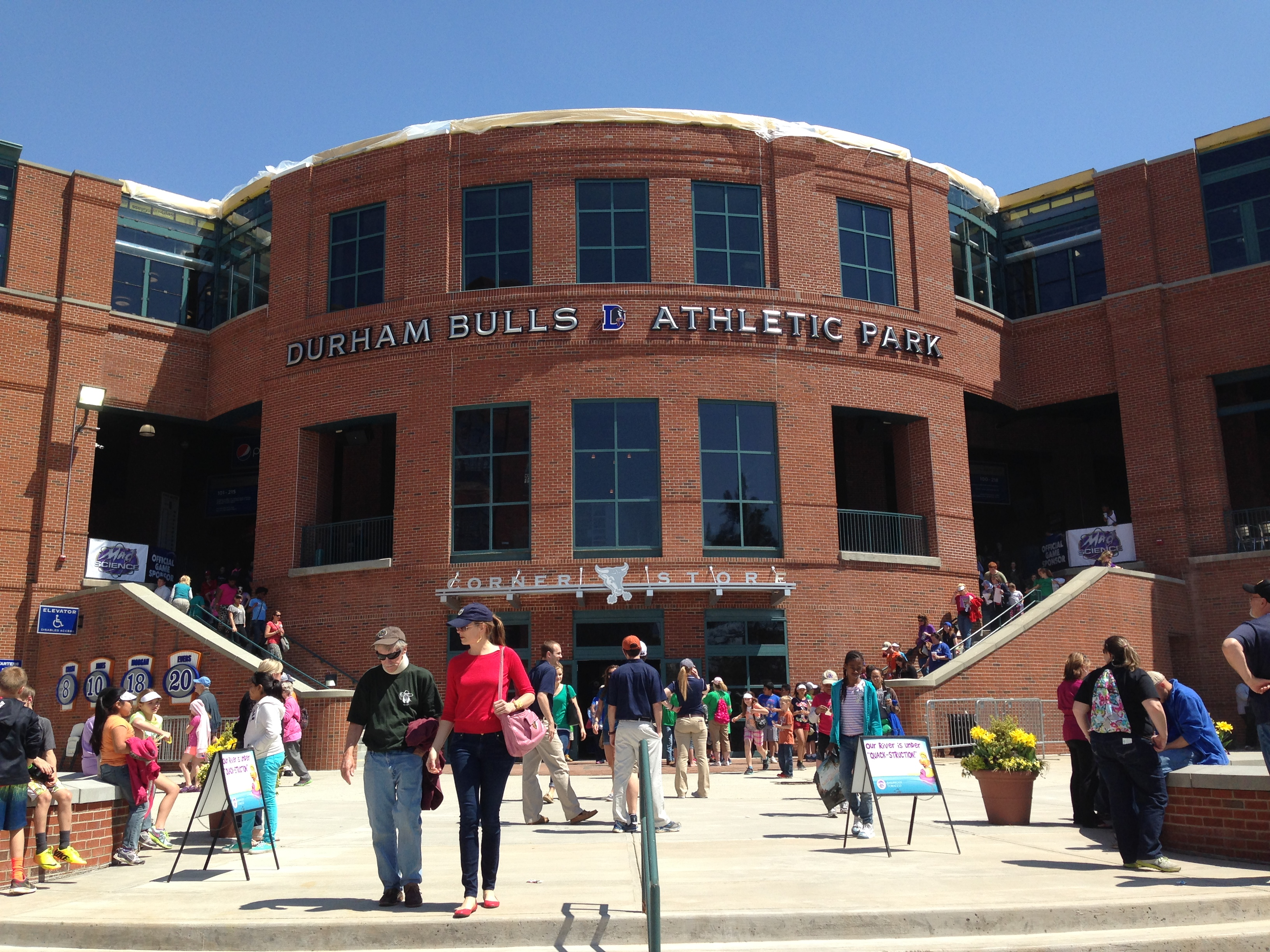
Durham Bulls Athletic Park (Durham Bulls)

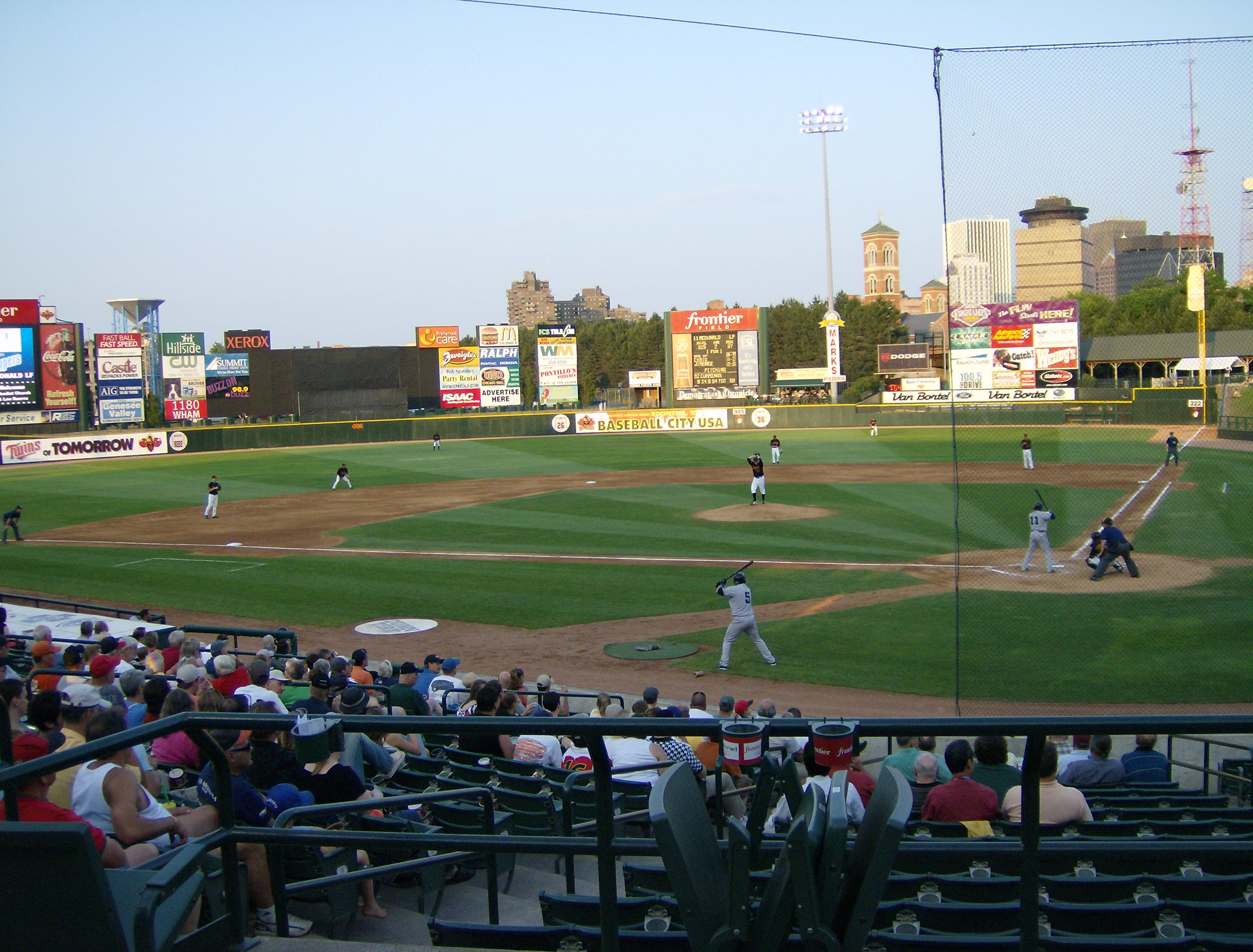
ESL Ballpark (Rochester Red Wings)

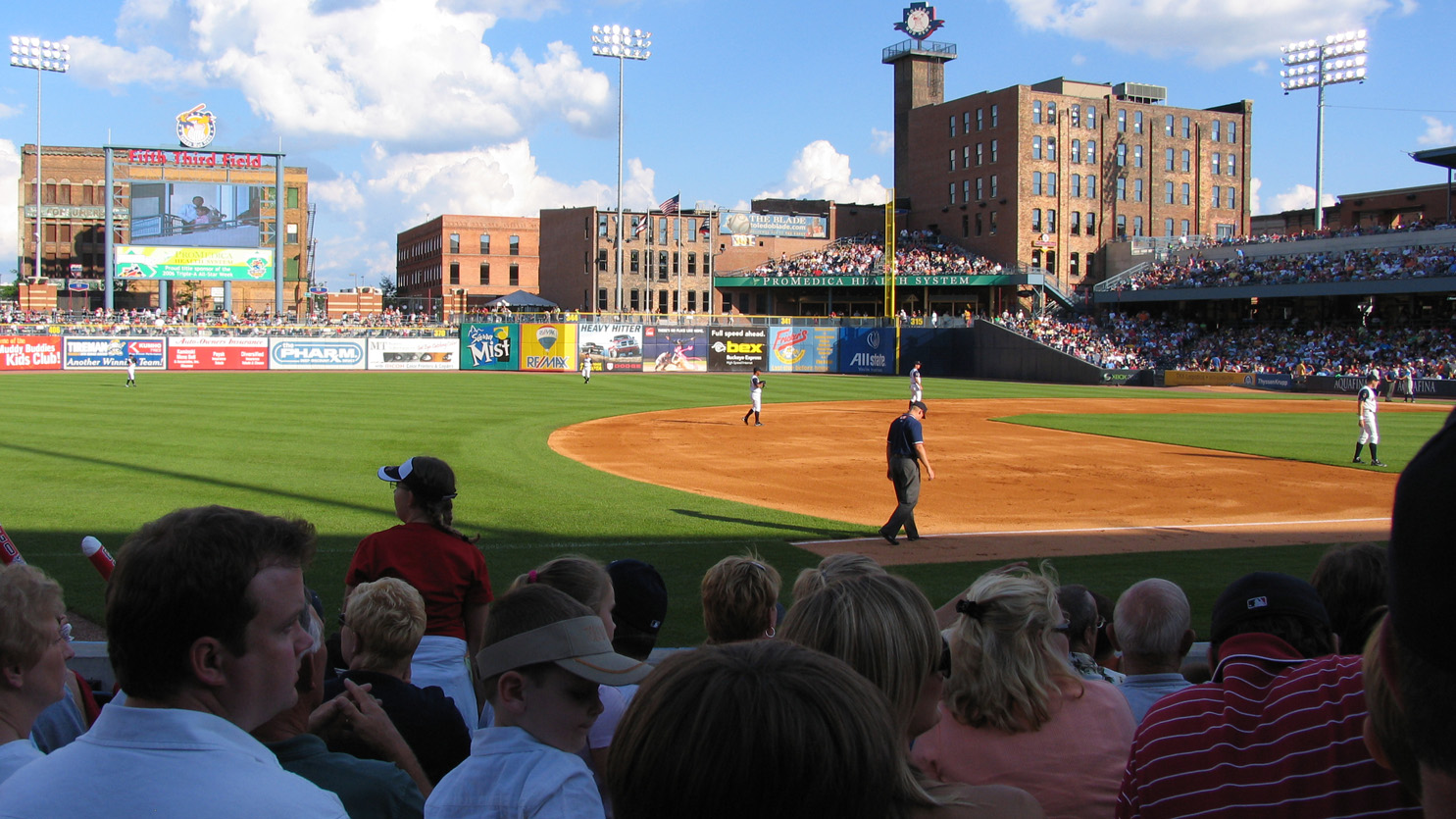
Fifth Third Field (Toledo Mud Hens)

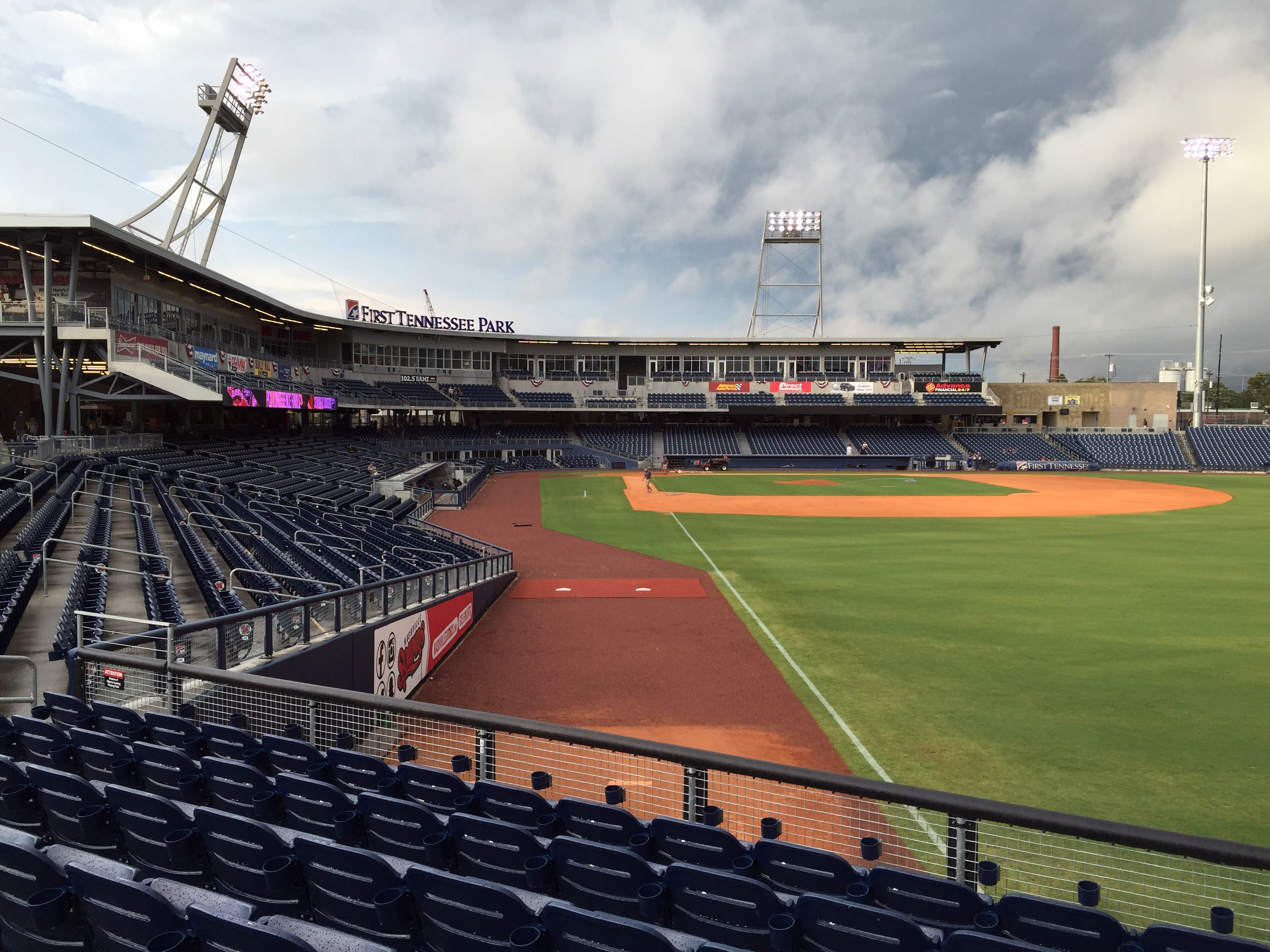
First Horizon Park (Nashville Sounds)

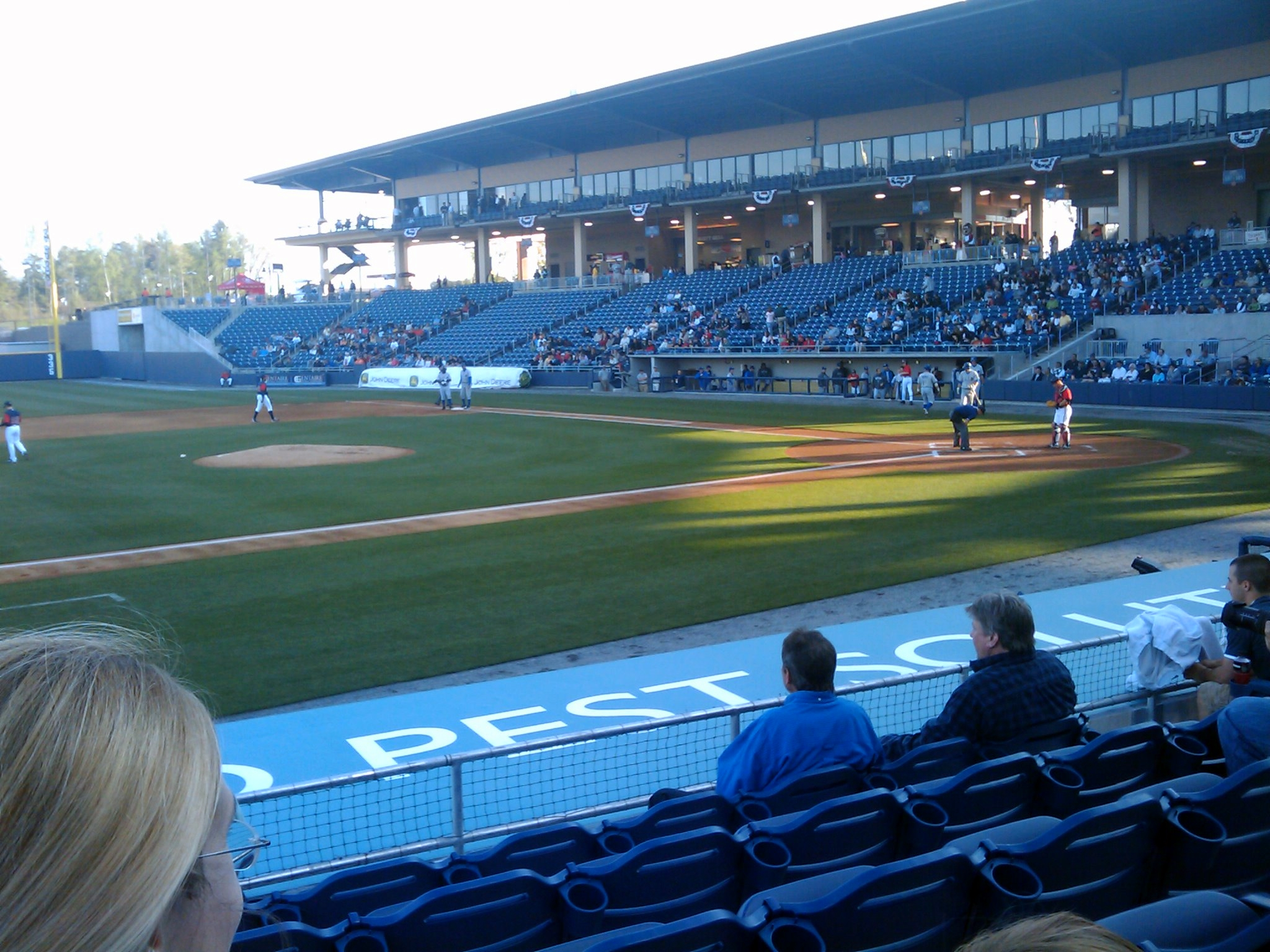
Gwinnett Field (Gwinnett Stripers)

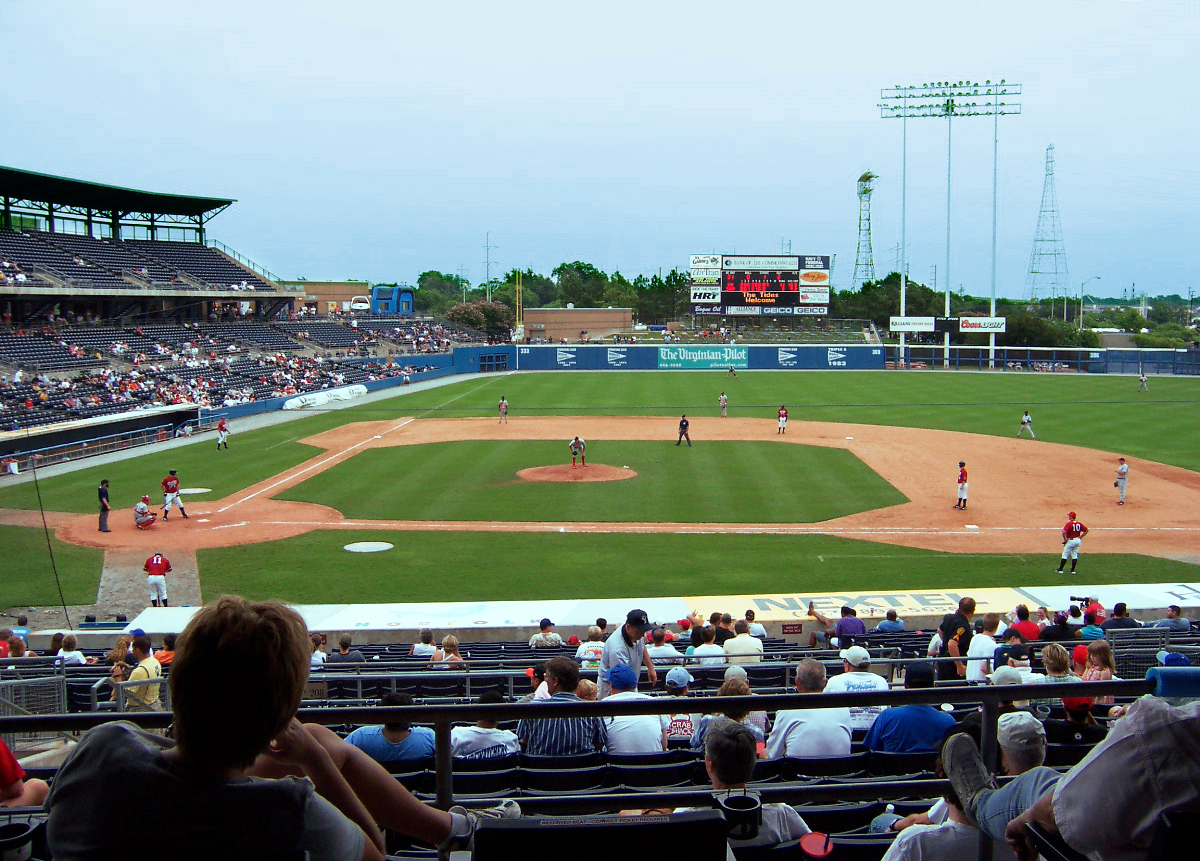
Harbor Park (Norfolk Tides)

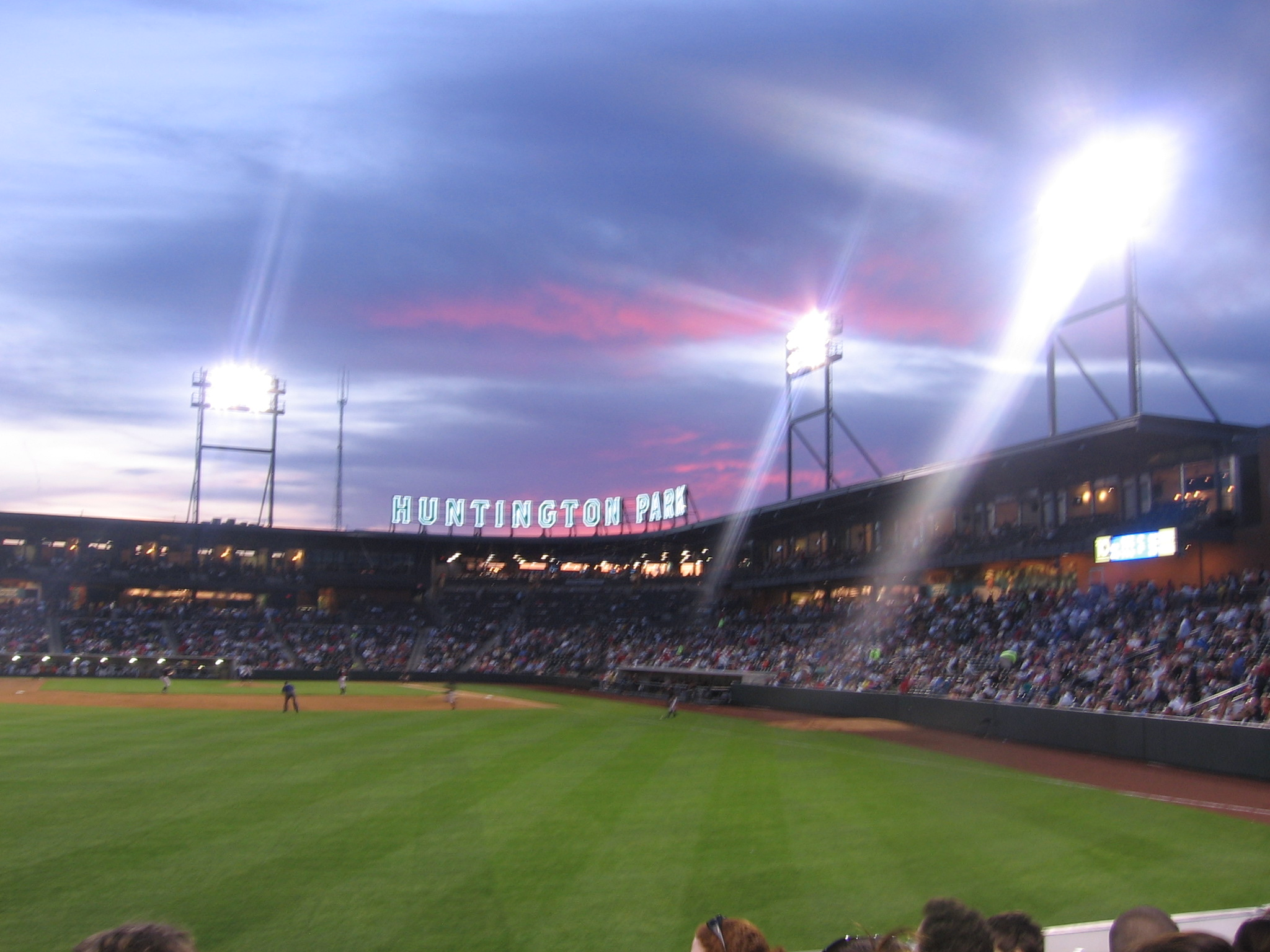
Huntington Park (Columbus Clippers)

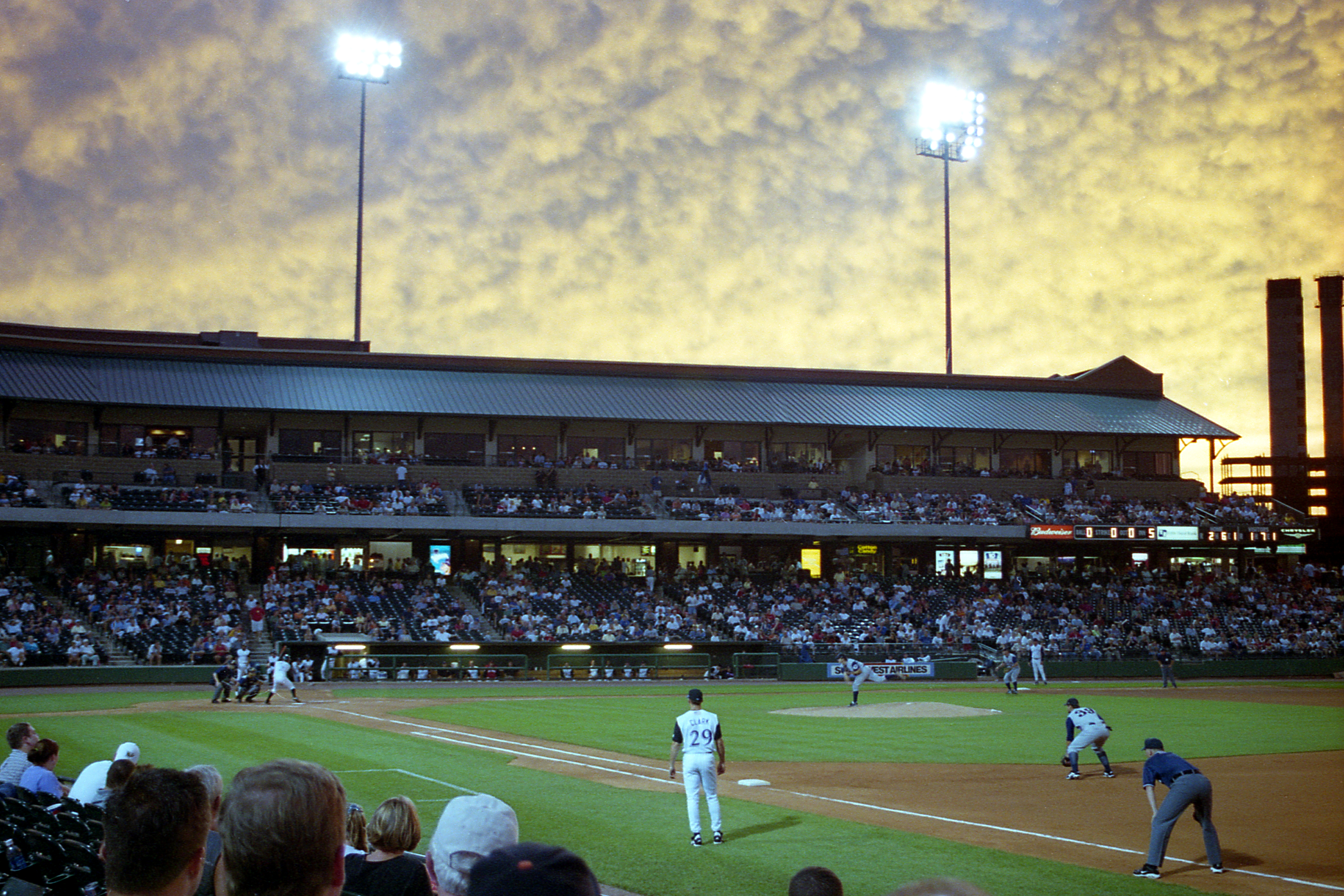
Louisville Slugger Field (Louisville Bats)

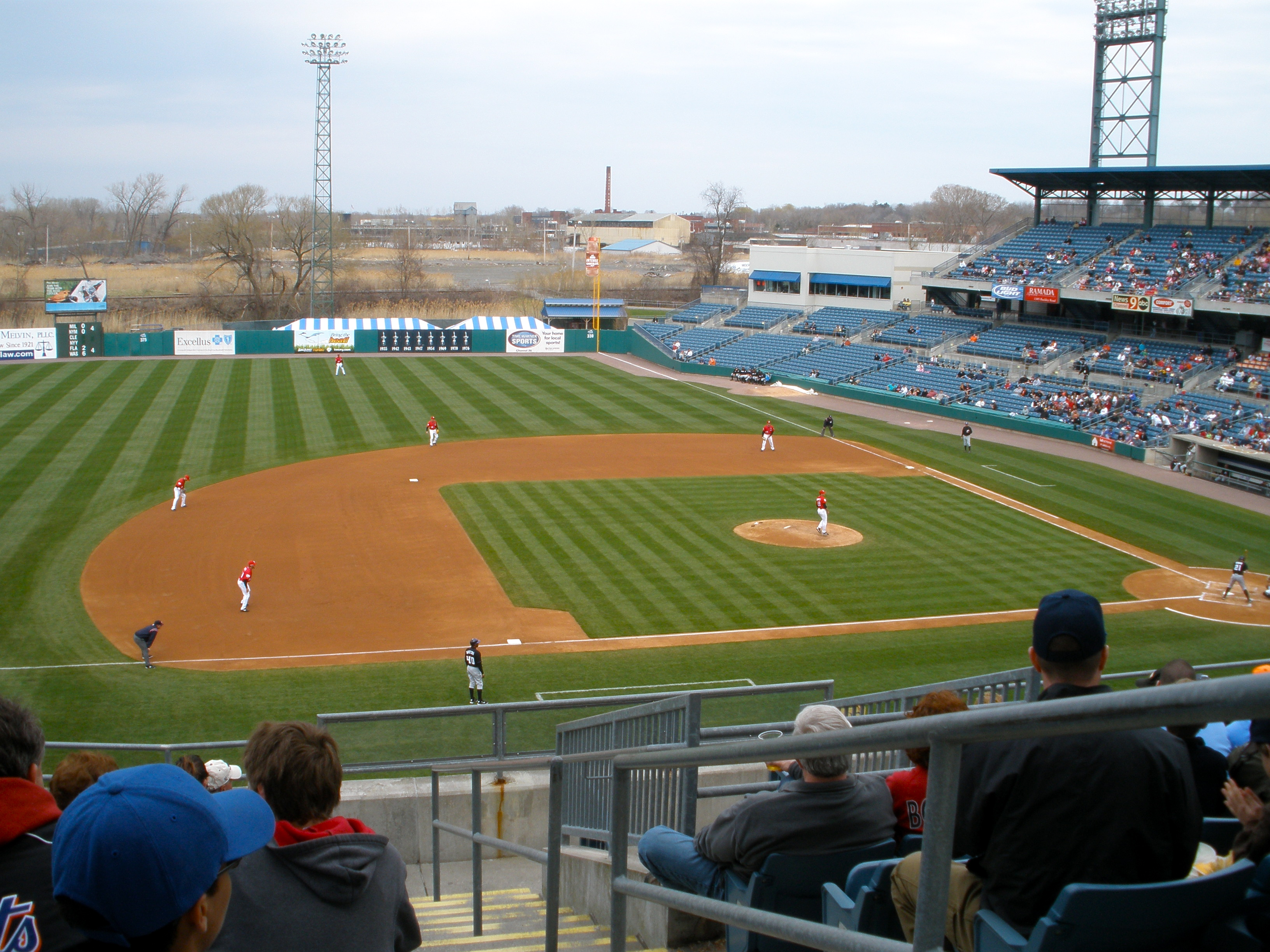
NBT Bank Stadium (Syracuse Mets)

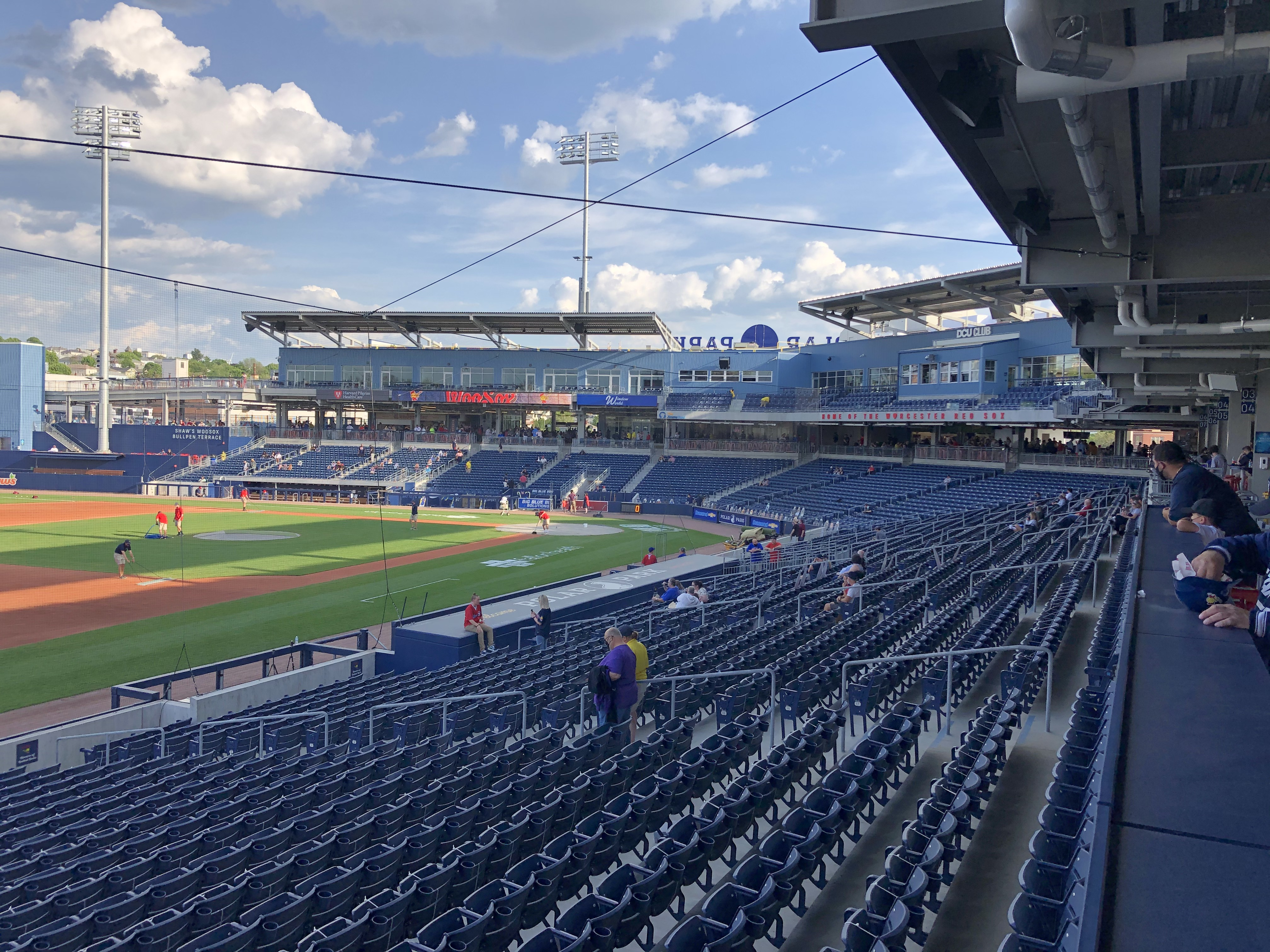
Polar Park (Worcester Red Sox)

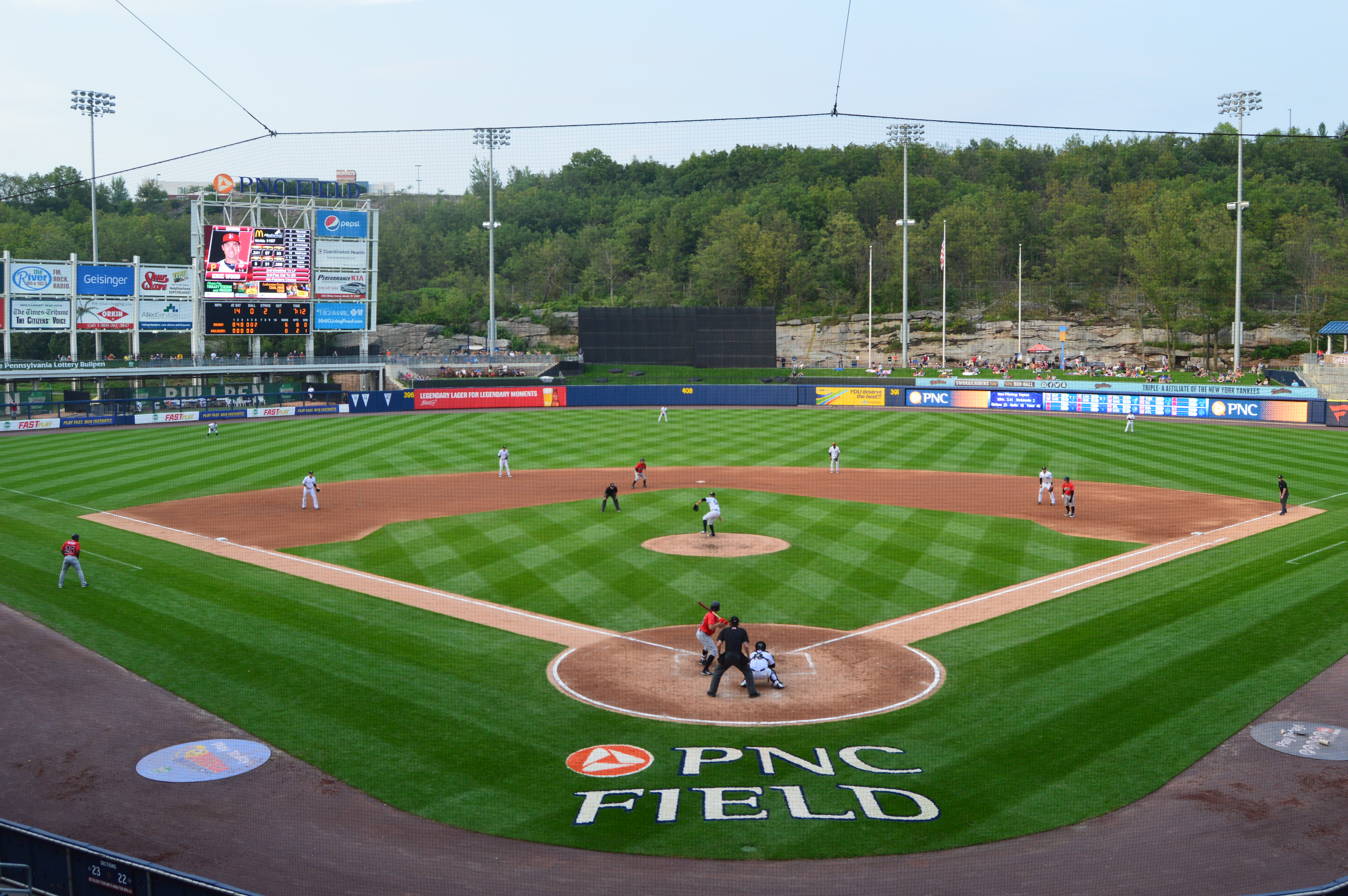
PNC Field (Scranton/Wilkes-Barre RailRiders)

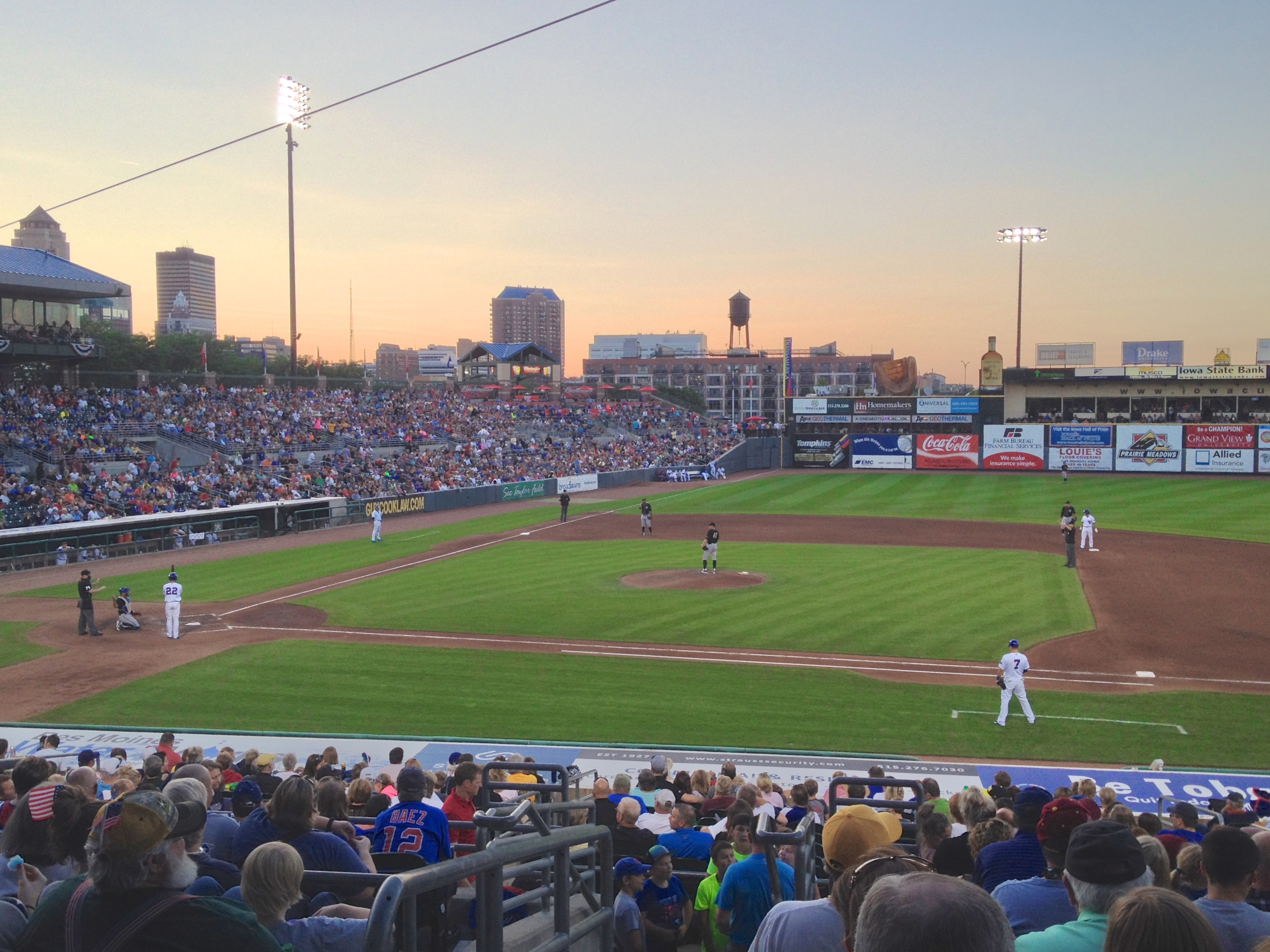
Principal Park (Iowa Cubs)

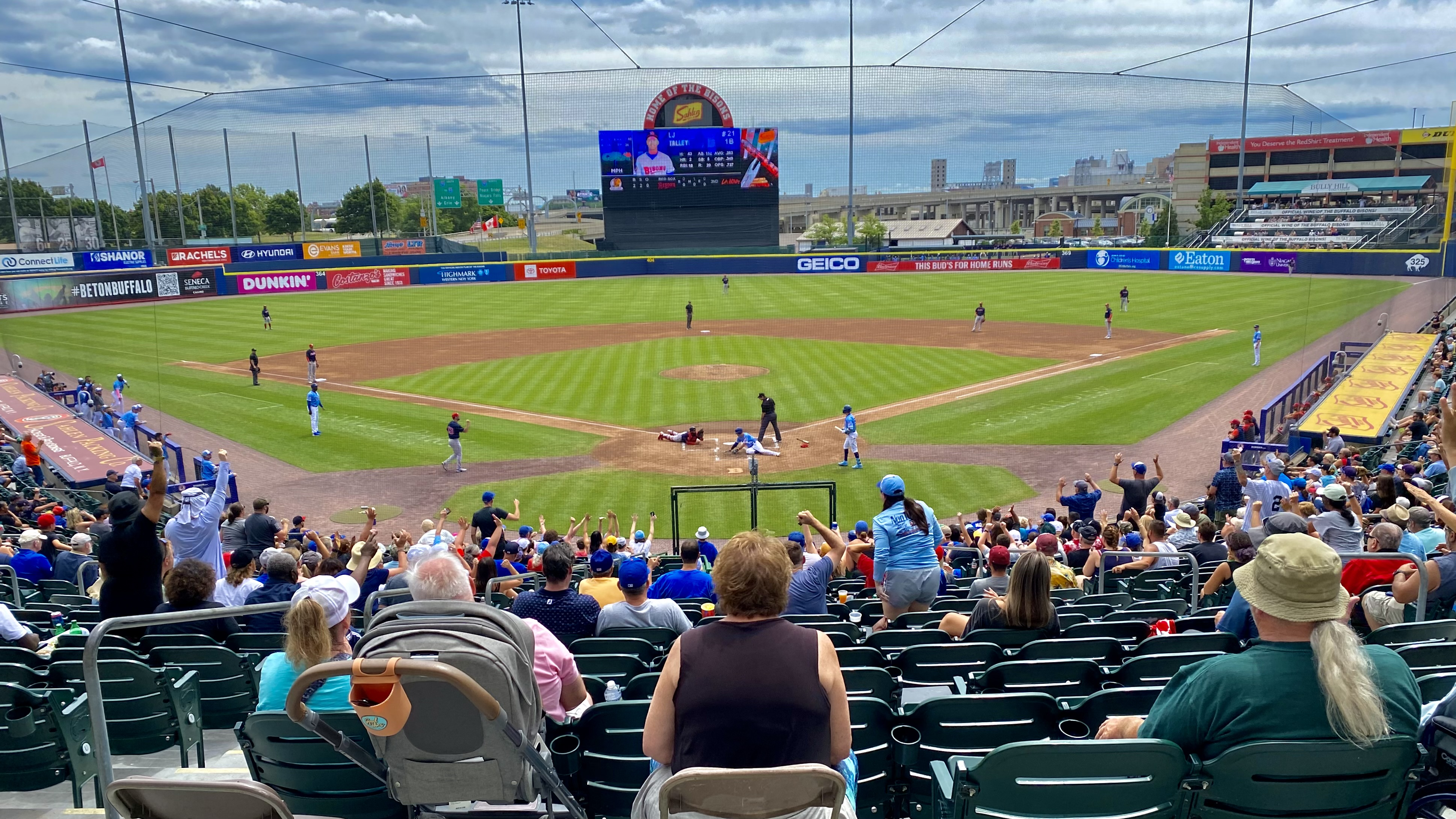
Sahlen Field (Buffalo Bisons)

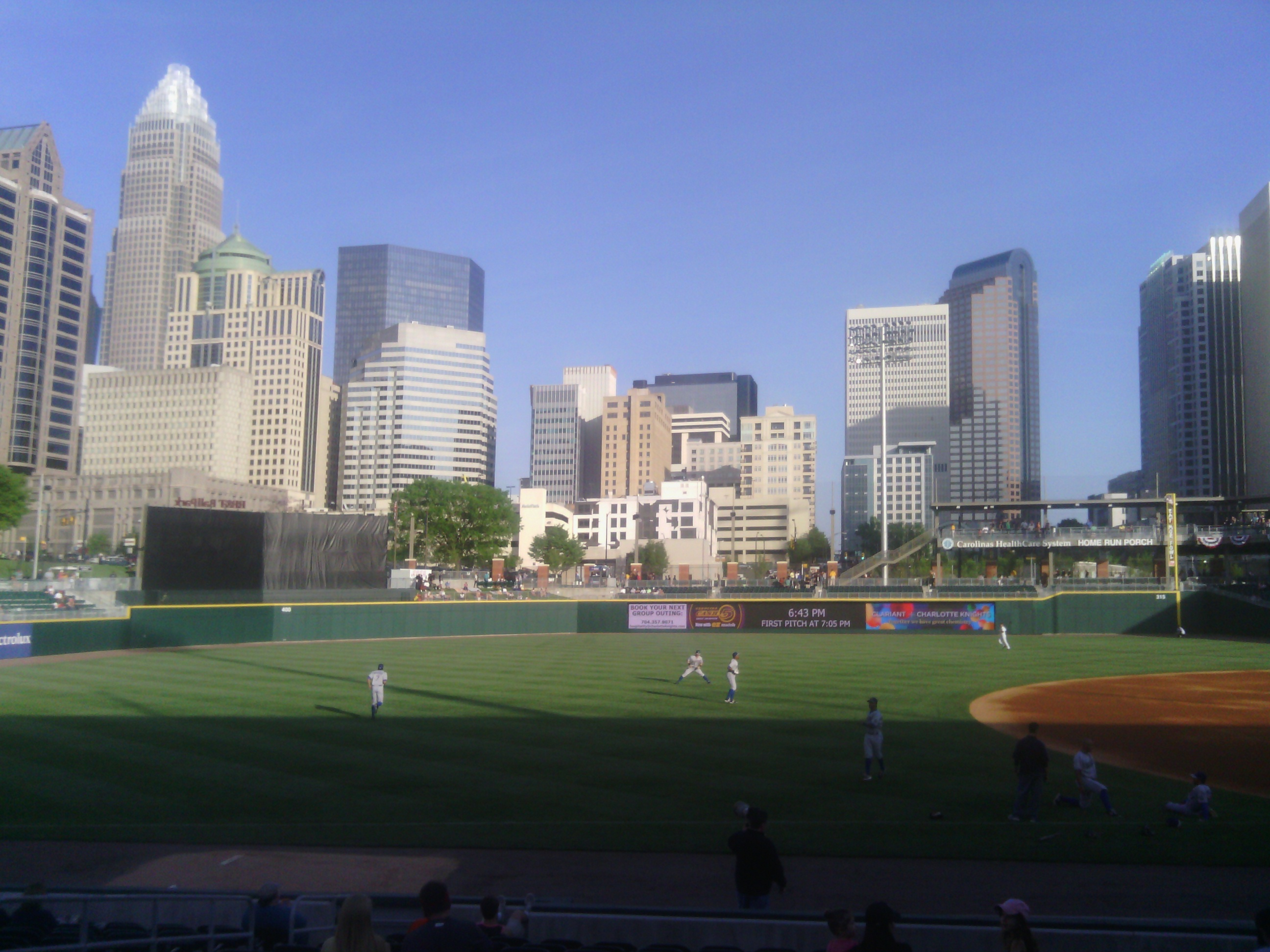
Truist Field (Charlotte Knights)

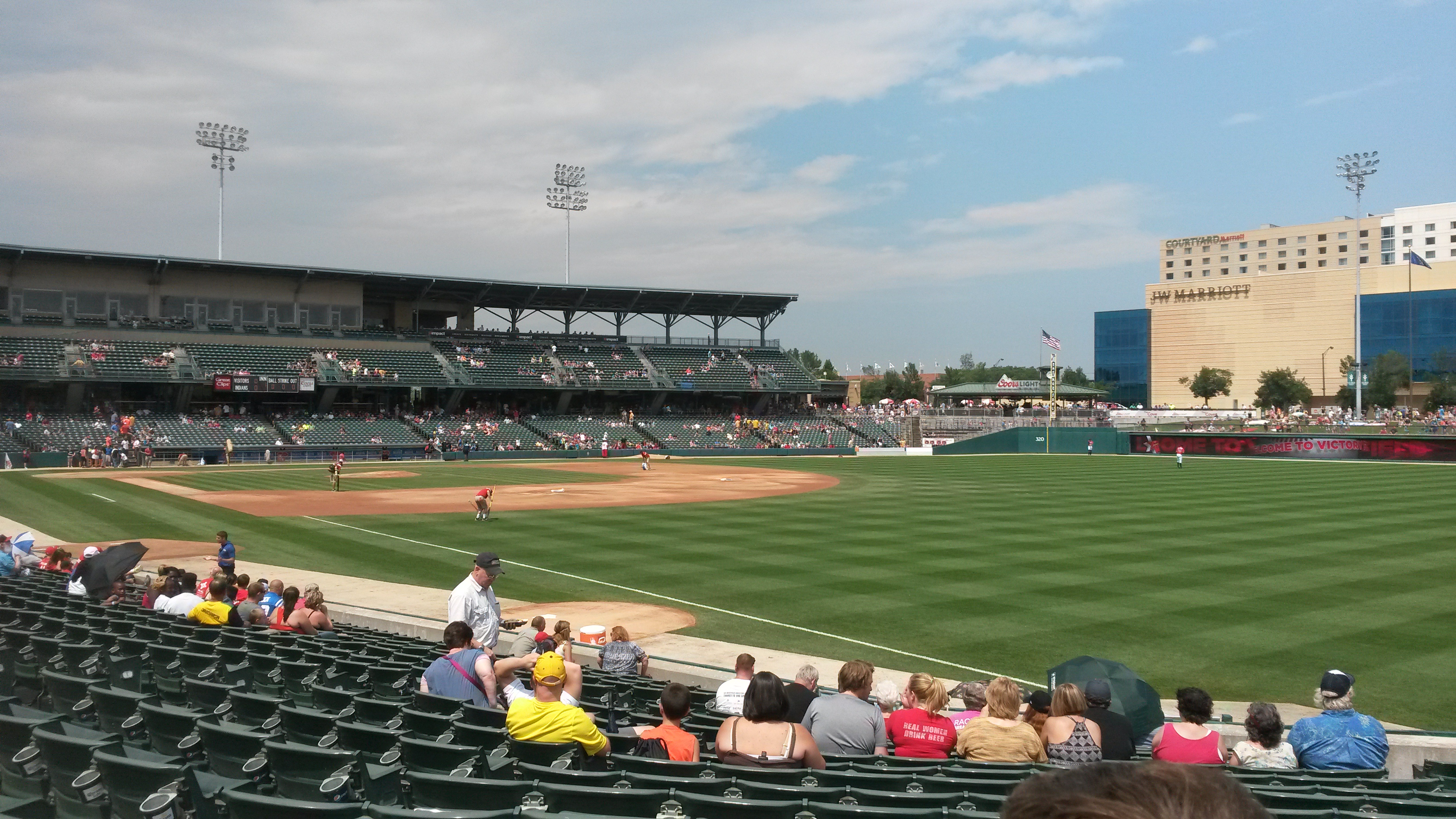
Victory Field (Indianapolis Indians)

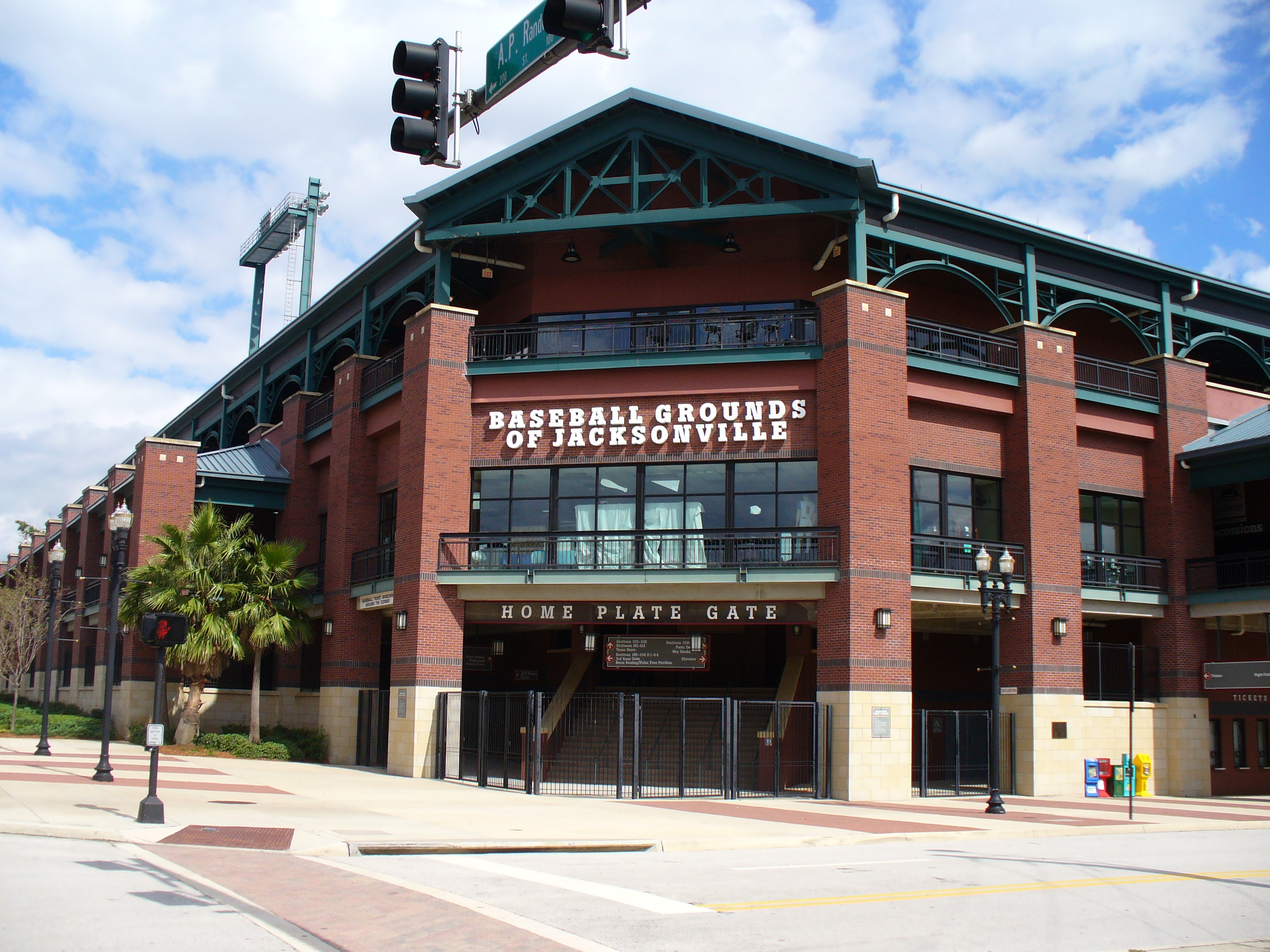
VyStar Ballpark (Jacksonville Jumbo Shrimp)

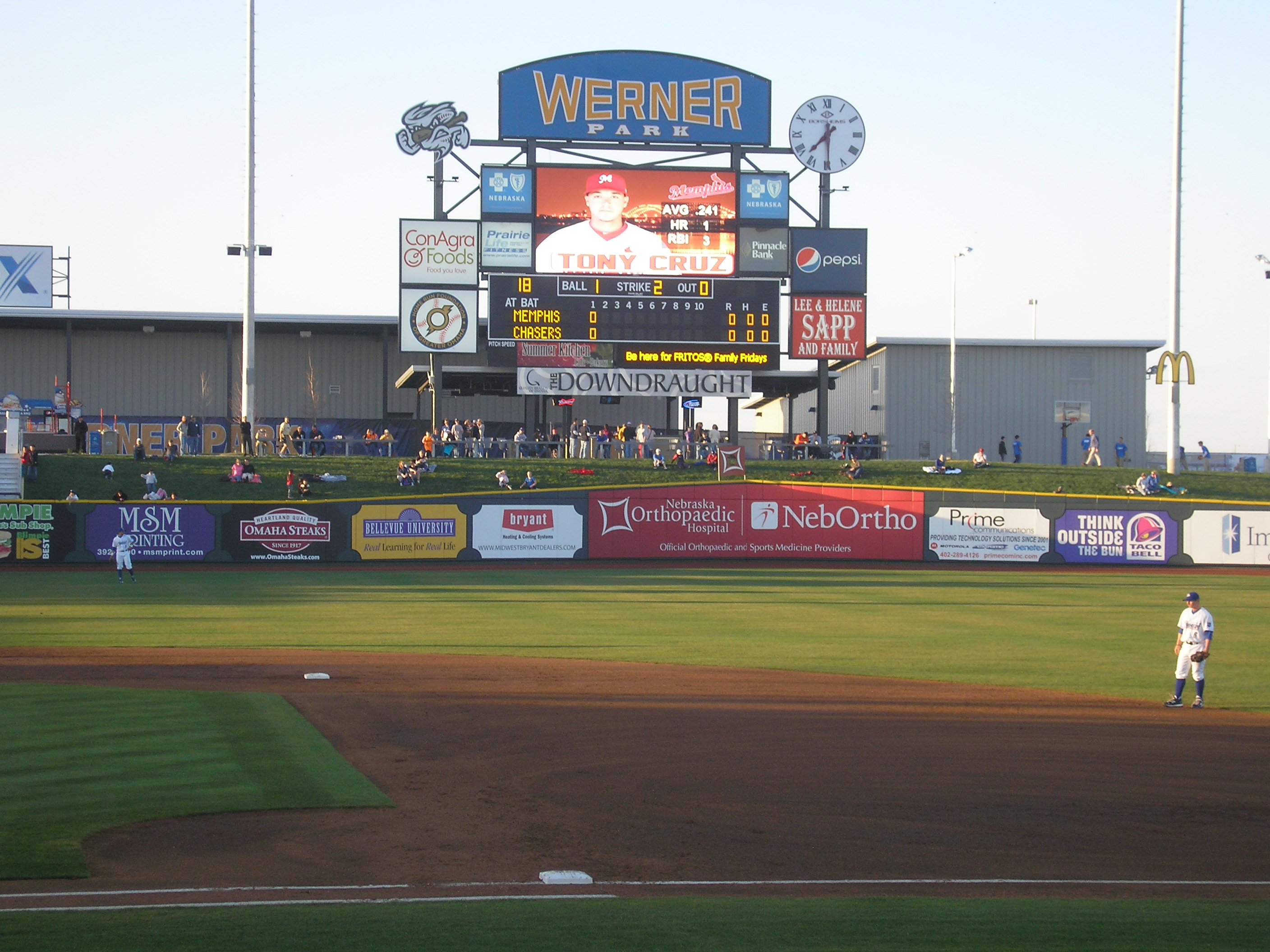
Werner Park (Omaha Storm Chasers)

=== Pacific Coast League ===
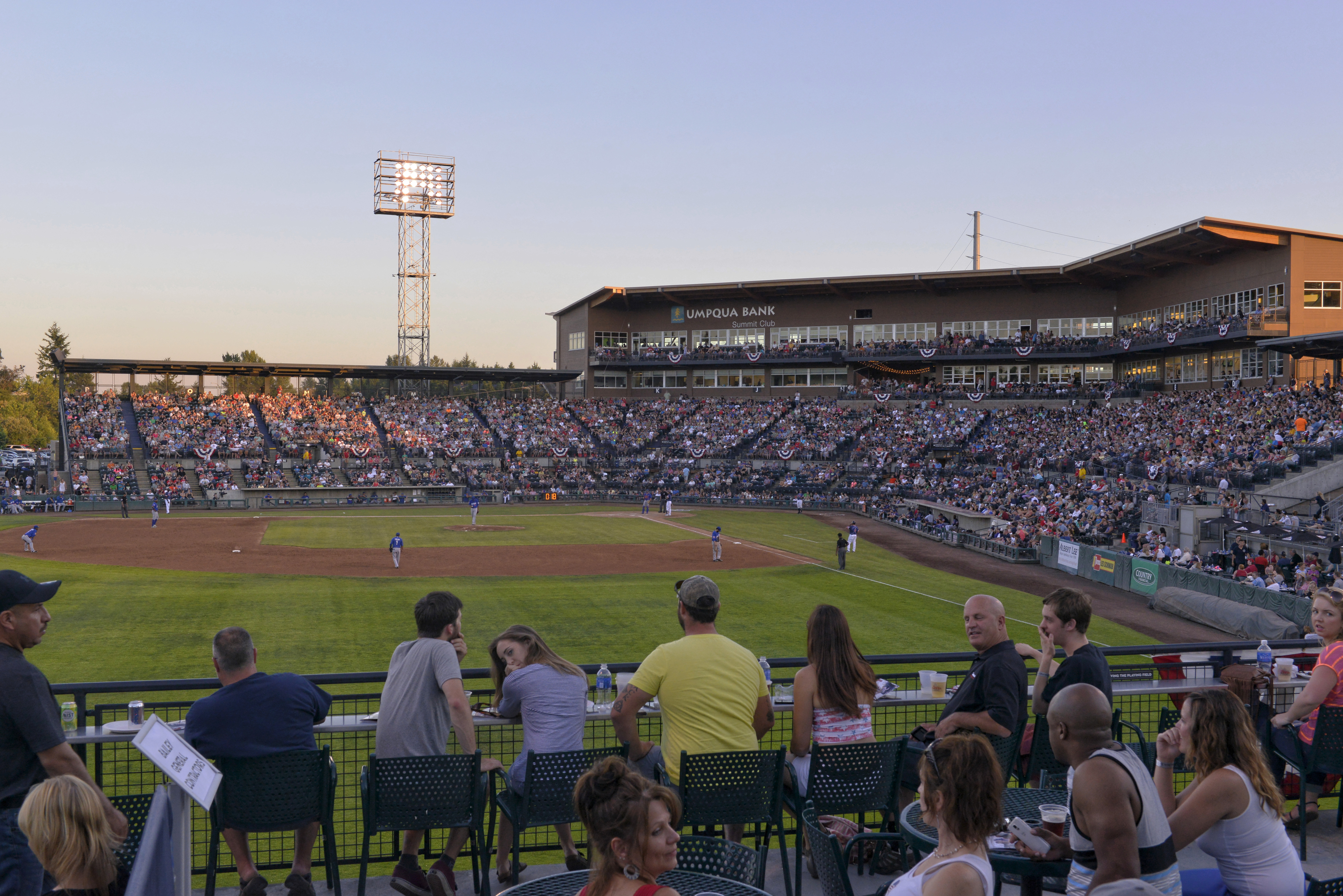
Cheney Stadium (Tacoma Rainiers)

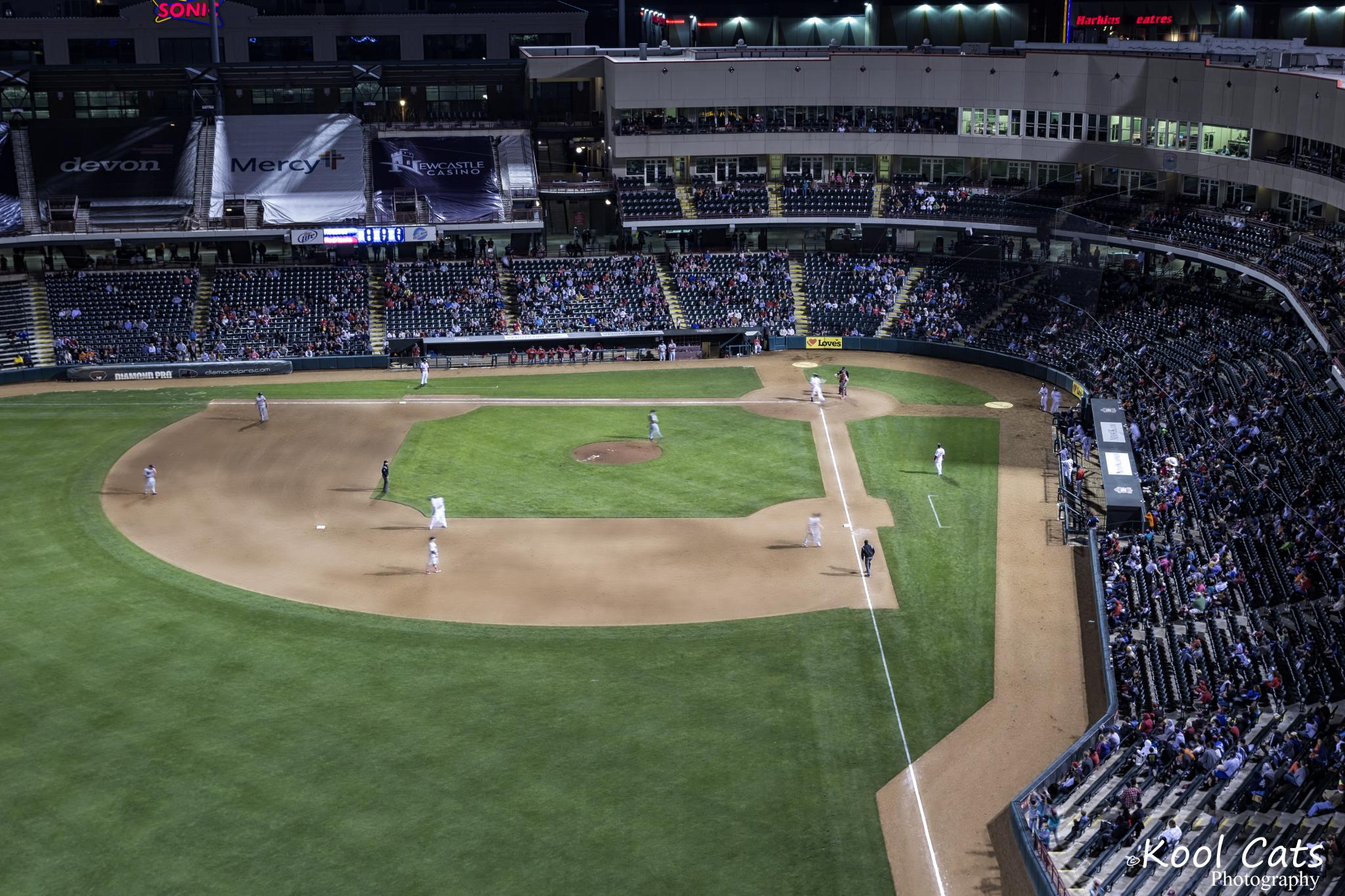
Chickasaw Bricktown Ballpark (Oklahoma City Comets)

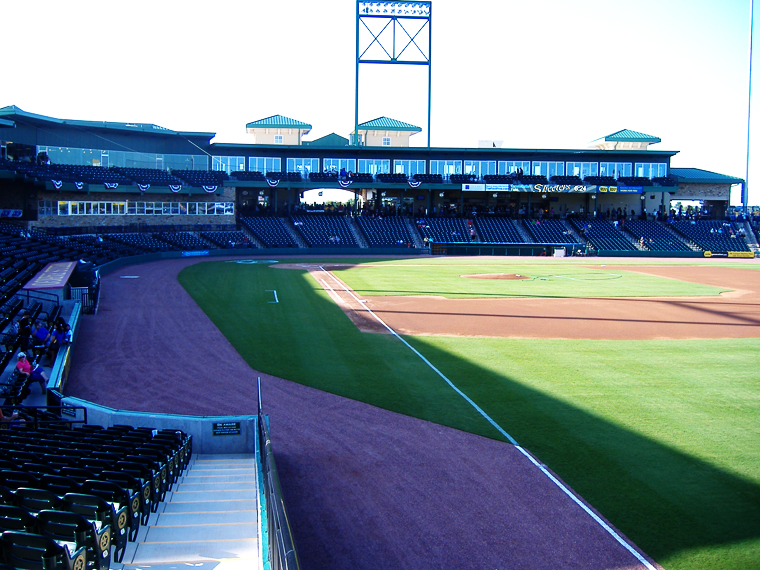
Constellation Field (Sugar Land Space Cowboys)

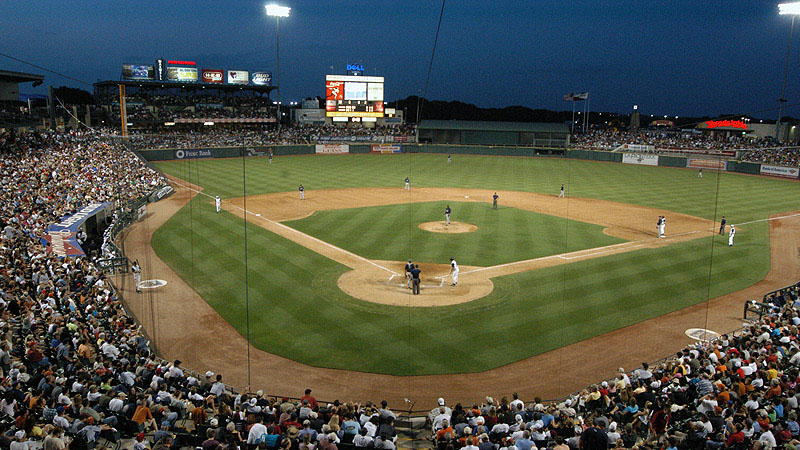
Dell Diamond (Round Rock Express)

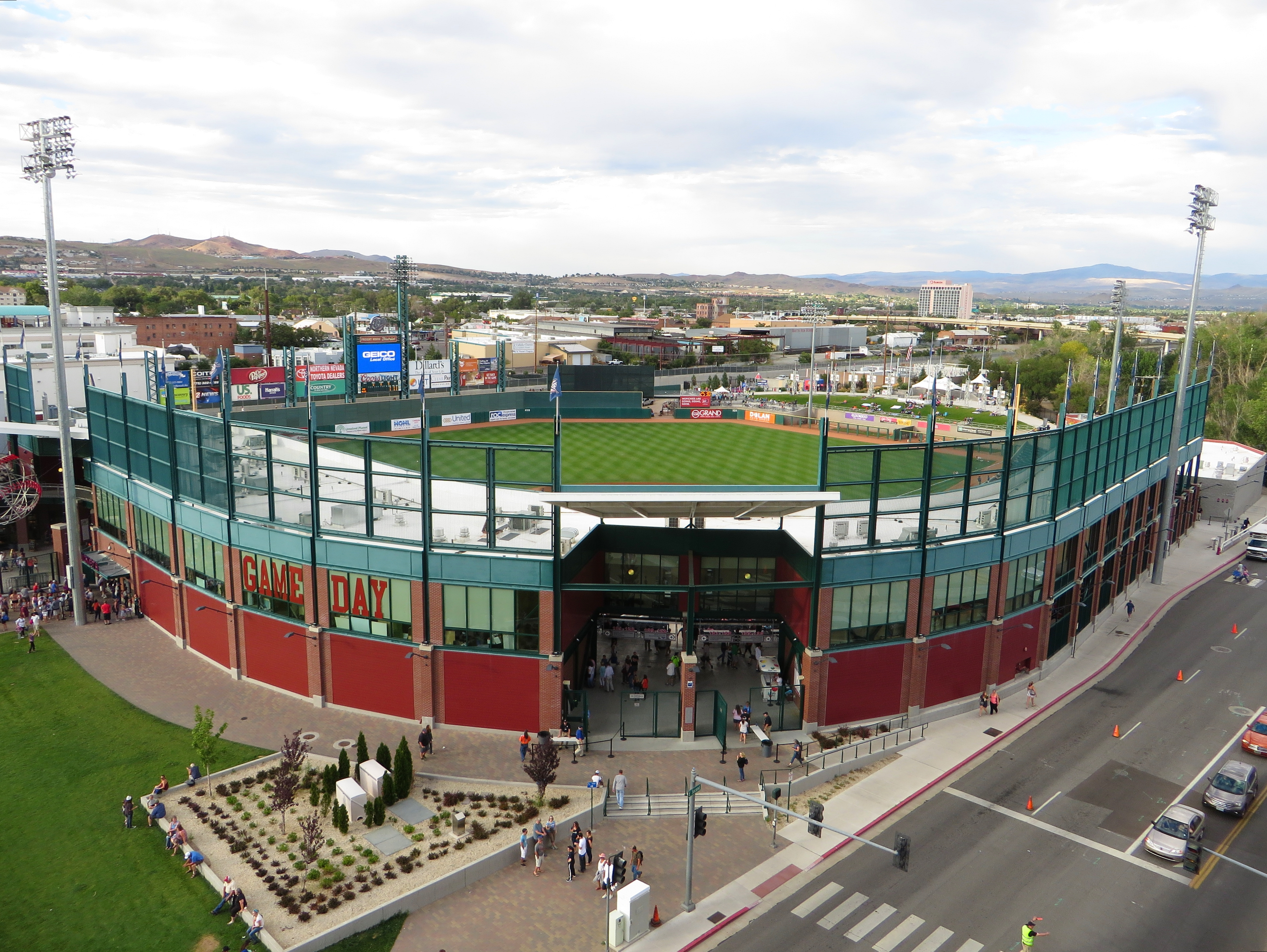
Greater Nevada Field (Reno Aces)

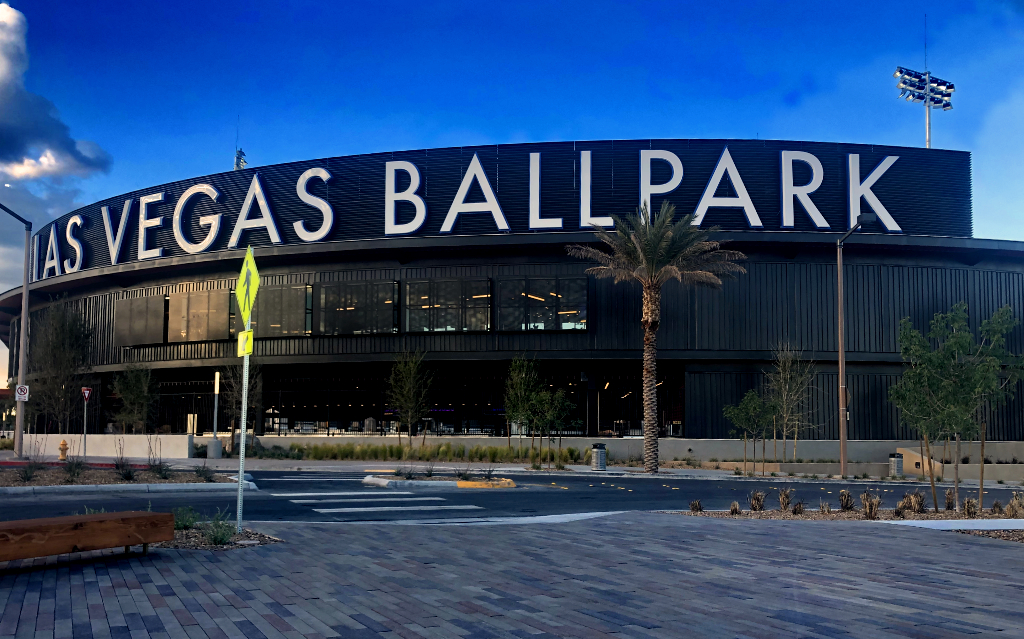
Las Vegas Ballpark (Las Vegas Aviators)

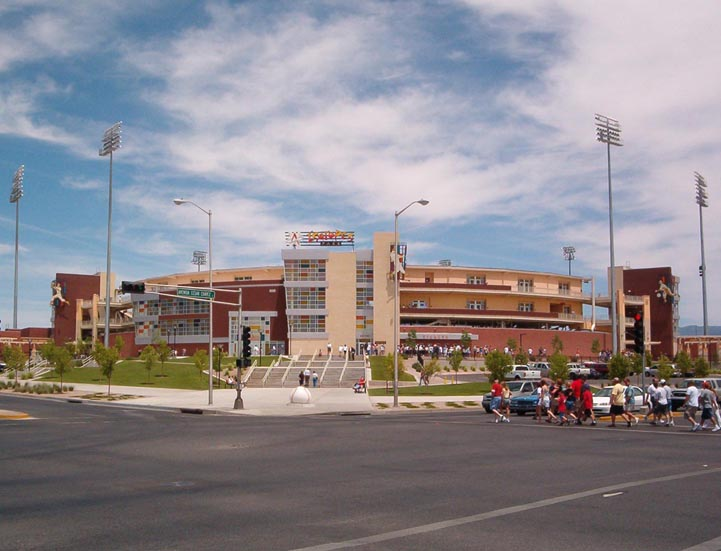
Rio Grande Credit Union Field at Isotopes Park (Albuquerque Isotopes)

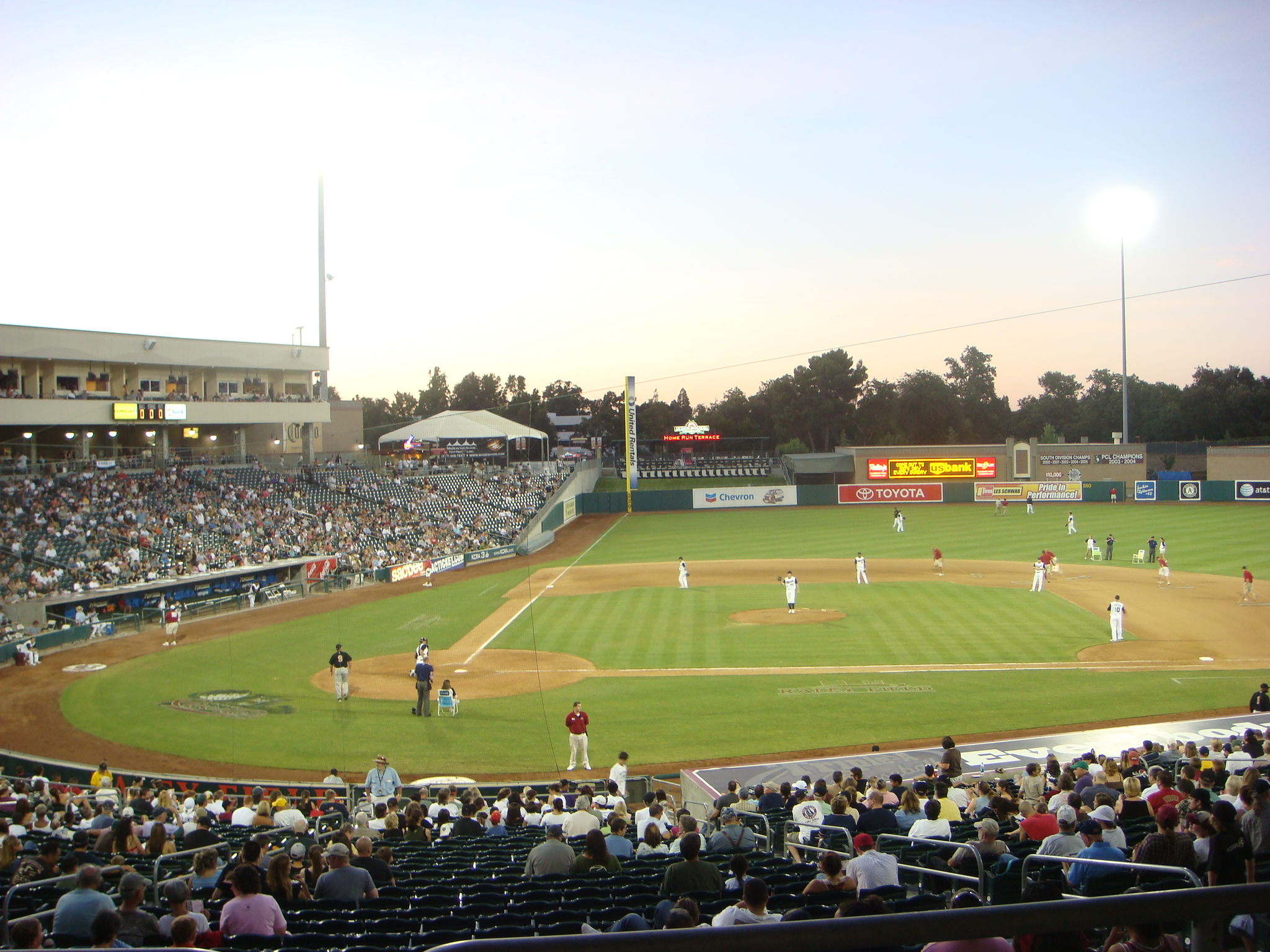
Sutter Health Park (Sacramento River Cats)

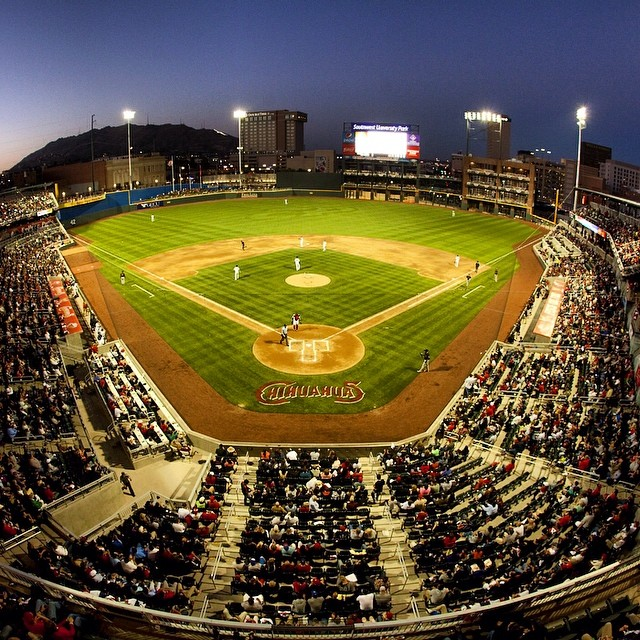
Southwest University Park (El Paso Chihuahuas)

== See also ==
- List of Major League Baseball stadiums
- List of Double-A baseball stadiums
- List of High-A baseball stadiums
- List of Single-A baseball stadiums
- List of Rookie baseball stadiums
