= Jamali Stadium =

Football stadium in Tlokweng, Botswana

- Township Rollers Stadium
- Location: Tlokweng; South East; Botswana
- Owner: Township Rollers
- Operator: Township Rollers
- Capacity: 10,000

Construction
- Groundbreaking: 2019
- Opened: 20 July 2019; 7 years ago

Tenant
- Township Rollers

Jamali Stadium, also known as Township Rollers Stadium, is a football stadium in Tlokweng, South East, Botswana and the home of Botswana Premier League club Township Rollers. It is the fifth club-owned stadium in Botswana.

Construction of the stadium was started in 2018 after Township Rollers raised concern over the condition of the Botswana National Stadium and UB Stadium which they had been using for league home matches. It was a joint project between club president Jagdish Shah and property mogul Sayed Jamali and was planned to be the first step of a Rollers City which would also include a resort, gym, shopping complex and training fields. The stadium was officially opened on 20 July 2019 with a friendly match between Premier League teams Notwane and Extension Gunners followed by another friendly between Township Rollers and Kaizer Chiefs.
