= List of baseball stadiums in South Korea =

The following is a list of baseball stadiums (baseball parks) in South Korea with a seating capacity of 10,000 or more.

== Current stadiums ==
Stadium	Image	Capacity	City	Tenants	Opened	Ref.
Busan Sajik Baseball Stadium		24,500	Busan	Lotte Giants	1985	
Daegu Samsung Lions Park		24,000	Daegu	Samsung Lions	2016	
Jamsil Baseball Stadium		23,750	Seoul	Former home of the LG Twins and Doosan Bears	1982	
Incheon SSG Landers Field		23,000	Incheon	SSG Landers	2002	
Changwon NC Park		22,112	Changwon	NC Dinos	2019	
Gwangju-Kia Champions Field		20,500	Gwangju	KIA Tigers	2014	
Suwon KT Wiz Park		20,000	Suwon	KT Wiz	1989	
Daejeon Hanwha Life Ballpark		20,000	Daejeon	Hanwha Eagles	2025	
Jamsil Olympic Stadium		18,000	Seoul	LG Twins and Doosan Bears	1984 (Note: Originally built in 1984, the venue was converted into a baseball stadium ahead of the 2027 season.)	
Gocheok Sky Dome		16,744	Seoul	Kiwoom Heroes	2015	
Hanbat Baseball Stadium		13,000	Daejeon	Former home of the Hanwha Eagles	1964	
Ulsan Munsu Baseball Stadium		12,088	Ulsan	Second home of the Lotte Giants	2014	
Pohang Baseball Stadium		12,000	Pohang	Second home of the Samsung Lions	2012	
Wolmyeong Stadium		12,000	Gunsan	Second home of the KIA Tigers	1989	
Masan Baseball Stadium		11,000	Masan	Former home of the NC Dinos	1982	
Cheongju Baseball Stadium		10,500	Cheongju	Second home of the Hanwha Eagles	1979	
Mokdong Baseball Stadium		10,500	Seoul	Former home of the Nexen Heroes	1989	

== See also ==
- Baseball in South Korea
- List of sports venues in South Korea
- List of football stadiums in South Korea
- List of baseball parks by capacity
