= List of New York Yankees minor league affiliates =

Locations of New York Yankees' current top three minor league affiliates.

The New York Yankees farm system consists of six Minor League Baseball affiliates across the United States and in the Dominican Republic as well. Three teams are owned by the major league club, while three others—the Scranton/Wilkes-Barre Highlanders, Somerset Patriots, and Hudson Valley Renegades—are independently owned.

The Yankees have been affiliated with the Rookie Florida Complex League Yankees of the Florida Complex League since 1980, making it the longest-running active affiliation in the organization. It is also the longest affiliation in the team's history. Their newest affiliates are the Somerset Patriots, which became the Yankees' Double-A affiliate in 2021, and the Hudson Valley Renegades, which became their High-A affiliate in 2021.

Geographically, New York's closest domestic affiliate is the Somerset Patriots of the Eastern League, which are approximately 38 miles (61 km) away. New York's furthest domestic affiliates are the Single-A Tampa Tarpons of the Florida State League and Florida Complex League Yankees, which share a facility some 1,012 miles (1,629 km) away.

== Current affiliates ==
The New York Yankees farm system consists of six minor league affiliates.

Class	Team	League	Location	Ballpark	Affiliated
Triple-A	Scranton/Wilkes-Barre Highlanders	International League	Moosic, Pennsylvania	PNC Field	2007
Double-A	Somerset Patriots	Eastern League	Bridgewater Township, New Jersey	TD Bank Ballpark	2021
High-A	Hudson Valley Renegades	South Atlantic League	Wappingers Falls, New York	Heritage Financial Park	2021
Single-A	Tampa Tarpons	Florida State League	Tampa, Florida	George M. Steinbrenner Field	1994
Rookie	FCL Yankees	Florida Complex League	Tampa, Florida	George M. Steinbrenner Field	1980
Rookie	DSL Yankees	Dominican Summer League	Boca Chica, Santo Domingo	New York Yankees Complex	1994

== Past affiliates ==
=== Key ===
Season	Each year is linked to an article about that particular Yankees season.

=== 1932–1962 ===
Minor League Baseball operated with five classes (Double-A, Class A, Class B, Class C, and Class D) from 1932 to 1935. Class A1, between Double-A and Class A, was added in 1936. The minors continued to operate with these six levels through 1945. Triple-A was established as the highest classification in 1946, and Class A1 became Double-A, with Class A through D remaining. These six levels continued through 1962. The Pacific Coast League (PCL) was reclassified from Triple-A to Open in 1952 due to the possibility of becoming a third major league. This arrangement ended following the 1957 season when the relocation of the National League's Dodgers and Giants to the West Coast ended any chance of the PCL being promoted.

Season	Triple-A	Double-A	Class A	Class B	Class C	Class D	Ref.
1932	—	Newark Bears	Springfield Rifles	Binghamton Triplets; Erie Sailors	Cumberland Colts	—	
1933	—	Newark Bears	Binghamton Triplets	Durham Bulls	Wheeling Stogies	—	
1934	—	Newark Bears	Binghamton Triplets	Norfolk Tars	Wheeling Stogies	Washington Generals	
1935	—	Newark Bears; Oakland Oaks	Binghamton Triplets	Norfolk Tars	Akron Yankees; Joplin Miners	Washington Generals	
1936	—	Newark Bears; Oakland Oaks	Binghamton Triplets	Norfolk Tars	Akron Yankees; Joplin Miners	Butler Yankees	
1937	—	Kansas City Blues; Newark Bears; Oakland Oaks	Binghamton Triplets	Augusta Tigers; Jackson Senators; Norfolk Tars	Akron Yankees; Bartlesville Blues; Joplin Miners; Smiths Falls Beavers	Butler Yankees; Norfolk Elks; Palatka Azaleas	
1938	—	Kansas City Blues; Newark Bears	Binghamton Triplets	Augusta Tigers; Jackson Senators; Norfolk Tars; Wenatchee Chiefs	Akron Yankees; Joplin Miners	Butler Yankees; Neosho Yankees; Norfolk Elks	
1939	—	Kansas City Blues; Newark Bears	Binghamton Triplets	Augusta Tigers; Norfolk Tars; Wenatchee Chiefs	Akron Yankees; Amsterdam Rugmakers; Joplin Miners	Butler Yankees; Big Spring Barons; Easton Yankees; El Paso Texans; Neosho Yankees; Newport Canners; Norfolk Elks	
1940	—	Kansas City Blues; Newark Bears	Binghamton Triplets	Augusta Tigers; Norfolk Tars; Wenatchee Chiefs	Akron Yankees; Amsterdam Rugmakers; Idaho Falls Russets; Joplin Miners	Butler Yankees; Easton Yankees; Neosho Yankees; Norfolk Yankees	
1941	—	Kansas City Blues; Newark Bears	Binghamton Triplets	Norfolk Tars	Akron Yankees; Amsterdam Rugmakers; Idaho Falls Russets; Joplin Miners	Butler Yankees; Easton Yankees; Norfolk Yankees	
1942	—	Kansas City Blues; Newark Bears	Binghamton Triplets	Norfolk Tars	Amsterdam Rugmakers; Joplin Miners	Butler Yankees; Fond du Lac Panthers; Wellsville Yankees	
1943	—	Kansas City Blues; Newark Bears	Binghamton Triplets	Norfolk Tars	—	Wellsville Yankees	
1944	—	Kansas City Blues; Newark Bears	Binghamton Triplets	Norfolk Tars	—	Wellsville Yankees	
1945	—	—	Binghamton Triplets	Norfolk Tars	—	Wellsville Yankees	
1946	Kansas City Blues; Newark Bears	Beaumont Exporters	Augusta Tigers; Binghamton Triplets	Norfolk Tars; Quincy Gems; Sunbury Yankees	Amsterdam Rugmakers; Butler Yankees; Joplin Miners; Twin Falls Cowboys	Easton Yankees; Fond du Lac Panthers; Wellsville Yankees	
1947	Kansas City Blues; Newark Bears	Beaumont Exporters	Augusta Tigers; Binghamton Triplets; Denver Bears	Norfolk Tars; Quincy Gems; Sunbury Yankees; Victoria Athletics	Amsterdam Rugmakers; Bisbee Yanks; Butler Yankees; Joplin Miners; Twin Falls Cowboys; Ventura Yankees	Easton Yankees; Fond du Lac Panthers; Independence Yankees; Stroudsburg Poconos	
1948	Kansas City Blues; Newark Bears	Beaumont Exporters	Augusta Tigers; Binghamton Triplets	Manchester Yankees; Norfolk Tars; Quincy Gems; Victoria Athletics	Amsterdam Rugmakers; Bisbee-Douglas Miners; Butler Yankees; Grand Forks Chiefs; Joplin Miners; Longview Texans; Twin Falls Cowboys; Ventura Yankees	Blackstone Barristers; Easton Yankees; Fond du Lac Panthers; Independence Yankees; La Grange Troupers; McAlester Rockets; Newark Yankees	
1949	Kansas City Blues; Newark Bears	Beaumont Exporters	Binghamton Triplets; Augusta Tigers	Manchester Yankees; Norfolk Tars; Quincy Gems; Victoria Athletics	Amsterdam Rugmakers; Grand Forks Chiefs; Joplin Miners; Twin Falls Cowboys; Ventura Yankees	Belleville Stags; Easton Yankees; Fond du Lac Panthers; Independence Yankees; La Grange Troupers; McAlester Rockets; Newark Yankees	
1950	Kansas City Blues	Beaumont Roughnecks	Binghamton Triplets; Muskegon Clippers	Norfolk Tars; Quincy Gems	Amsterdam Rugmakers; Grand Forks Chiefs; Joplin Miners; Twin Falls Cowboys	Fond du Lac Panthers; Independence Yankees; La Grange Troupers; McAlester Rockets; Newark Yankees	
1951	Kansas City Blues; San Francisco Seals	Beaumont Roughnecks	Binghamton Triplets; Muskegon Reds	Norfolk Tars; Quincy Gems	Amsterdam Rugmakers; Joplin Miners; Twin Falls Cowboys	Fond du Lac Panthers; La Grange Troupers; McAlester Rockets; Newark Yankees	
1952	Kansas City Blues	Beaumont Roughnecks	Binghamton Triplets	Norfolk Tars; Quincy Gems	Boise Yankees; Joplin Miners	Fond du Lac Panthers; McAlester Rockets; Olean Yankees	
1953	Kansas City Blues; Syracuse Chiefs	Birmingham Barons	Binghamton Triplets	Norfolk Tars; Quincy Gems	Boise Yankees; Joplin Miners	McAlester Rockets; Olean Yankees; Owensboro Oilers	
1954	Kansas City Blues	Birmingham Barons	Binghamton Triplets	Norfolk Tars; Quincy Gems	Modesto Reds; St. Joseph Saints	Bristol Twins; McAlester Rockets; Owensboro Oilers	
1955	Denver Bears	Birmingham Barons	Binghamton Triplets	Norfolk Tars; Quincy Gems; Winston-Salem Twins	Modesto Reds; Monroe Sports	Bristol Twins; McAlester Rockets; Owensboro Oilers	
1956	Denver Bears; Richmond Virginians	Birmingham Barons	Binghamton Triplets	Quincy Gems; Winston-Salem Twins	Modesto Reds; Monroe Sports	Bradford Yankees; Kearney Yankees; McAlester Rockets; St. Petersburg Saints	
1957	Denver Bears; Richmond Virginians	New Orleans Pelicans	Binghamton Triplets	Peoria Chiefs	Alexandria Aces; Modesto Reds	Greenville Majors; Kearney Yankees; St. Petersburg Saints	
1958	Denver Bears; Richmond Virginians	New Orleans Pelicans	Binghamton Triplets	Greensboro Yankees	Fargo-Moorhead Twins; Modesto Reds	Auburn Yankees; Kearney Yankees; St. Petersburg Saints	
1959	Richmond Virginians	—	Binghamton Triplets	Greensboro Yankees	Fargo-Moorhead Twins; Modesto Reds	Auburn Yankees; Kearney Yankees; St. Petersburg Saints	
1960	Richmond Virginians	Amarillo Gold Sox	Binghamton Triplets	Greensboro Yankees	Fargo-Moorhead Twins; Modesto Reds	Auburn Yankees; St. Petersburg Saints	
1961	Richmond Virginians	Amarillo Gold Sox	Binghamton Triplets	Greensboro Yankees	Modesto Reds	Auburn Yankees; St. Petersburg Saints	
1962	Richmond Virginians	Amarillo Gold Sox	Augusta Yankees	Greensboro Yankees	Idaho Falls Yankees	Fort Lauderdale Yankees; Harlan Smokies	

=== 1963–1989 ===
Prior to the 1963 season, Major League Baseball (MLB) initiated a reorganization of Minor League Baseball that resulted in a reduction from six classes to four (Triple-A, Double-A, Class A, and Rookie) in response to the general decline of the minors throughout the 1950s and early-1960s when leagues and teams folded due to shrinking attendance caused by baseball fans' preference for staying at home to watch MLB games on television. The only change made within the next 27 years was Class A being subdivided for the first time to form Class A Short Season in 1966.

Season	Triple-A	Double-A	Class A	Class A Short Season	Rookie	Ref(s).
1963	Richmond Virginians	Augusta Yankees	Fort Lauderdale Yankees; Greensboro Yankees; Idaho Falls Yankees; Shelby Colonels	—	Harlan Yankees	
1964	Richmond Virginians	Columbus Confederate Yankees	Fort Lauderdale Yankees; Greensboro Yankees; Shelby Yankees	—	Johnson City Yankees; SRL Yankees	
1965	Toledo Mud Hens	Columbus Confederate Yankees	Binghamton Triplets; Fort Lauderdale Yankees; Greensboro Yankees	—	Johnson City Yankees; FRL Yankees	
1966	Toledo Mud Hens	Columbus Confederate Yankees	Binghamton Triplets; Fort Lauderdale Yankees; Greensboro Yankees	—	Johnson City Yankees; GCL Yankees	
1967	Syracuse Chiefs	Binghamton Triplets	Fort Lauderdale Yankees; Greensboro Yankees	Oneonta Yankees	Johnson City Yankees	
1968	Syracuse Chiefs	Binghamton Triplets	Fort Lauderdale Yankees; Kinston Eagles	Oneonta Yankees	Johnson City Yankees	
1969	Syracuse Chiefs	Manchester Yankees	Fort Lauderdale Yankees; Kinston Eagles	Oneonta Yankees	Johnson City Yankees	
1970	Syracuse Chiefs	Manchester Yankees	Fort Lauderdale Yankees; Kinston Eagles	Oneonta Yankees	Johnson City Yankees	
1971	Syracuse Chiefs	Manchester Yankees	Fort Lauderdale Yankees; Kinston Eagles	Oneonta Yankees	Johnson City Yankees	
1972	Syracuse Chiefs	West Haven Yankees	Fort Lauderdale Yankees; Kinston Eagles	Oneonta Yankees	Johnson City Yankees	
1973	Syracuse Chiefs	West Haven Yankees	Fort Lauderdale Yankees	Oneonta Yankees	Johnson City Yankees	
1974	Syracuse Chiefs	West Haven Yankees	Fort Lauderdale Yankees	Oneonta Yankees	Johnson City Yankees	
1975	Syracuse Chiefs	West Haven Yankees	Fort Lauderdale Yankees	Oneonta Yankees	—	
1976	Syracuse Chiefs	West Haven Yankees	Fort Lauderdale Yankees	Oneonta Yankees	—	
1977	Syracuse Chiefs	West Haven Yankees	Fort Lauderdale Yankees	Oneonta Yankees	—	
1978	Tacoma Yankees	West Haven Yankees	Fort Lauderdale Yankees	Oneonta Yankees	—	
1979	Columbus Clippers	West Haven Yankees	Fort Lauderdale Yankees	Oneonta Yankees	Paintsville Yankees	
1980	Columbus Clippers	Nashville Sounds	Fort Lauderdale Yankees; Greensboro Hornets	Oneonta Yankees	Paintsville Yankees; GCL Yankees	
1981	Columbus Clippers	Nashville Sounds	Fort Lauderdale Yankees; Greensboro Hornets	Oneonta Yankees	Paintsville Yankees; GCL Yankees	
1982	Columbus Clippers	Nashville Sounds	Fort Lauderdale Yankees; Greensboro Hornets	Oneonta Yankees	Paintsville Yankees; GCL Yankees	
1983	Columbus Clippers	Nashville Sounds	Fort Lauderdale Yankees; Greensboro Hornets	Oneonta Yankees	—	
1984	Columbus Clippers	Nashville Sounds	Fort Lauderdale Yankees; Greensboro Hornets	Oneonta Yankees	GCL Yankees	
1985	Columbus Clippers	Albany-Colonie Yankees	Fort Lauderdale Yankees	Oneonta Yankees	GCL Yankees	
1986	Columbus Clippers	Albany-Colonie Yankees	Fort Lauderdale Yankees	Oneonta Yankees	GCL Yankees	
1987	Columbus Clippers	Albany-Colonie Yankees	Fort Lauderdale Yankees; Prince William Cannons	Oneonta Yankees	GCL Yankees	
1988	Columbus Clippers	Albany-Colonie Yankees	Fort Lauderdale Yankees; Prince William Cannons	Oneonta Yankees	GCL Yankees	
1989	Columbus Clippers	Albany-Colonie Yankees	Fort Lauderdale Yankees; Prince William Cannons	Oneonta Yankees	GCL Yankees; DSL Yankees	

=== 1990–2020 ===
Minor League Baseball operated with six classes from 1990 to 2020. In 1990, the Class A level was subdivided for a second time with the creation of Class A-Advanced. The Rookie level consisted of domestic and foreign circuits.

Season	Triple-A	Double-A	Class A-Advanced	Class A	Class A Short Season	Rookie	Foreign Rookie	Ref(s).
1990	Columbus Clippers	Albany-Colonie Yankees	Fort Lauderdale Yankees; Prince William Cannons	Greensboro Hornets	Oneonta Yankees	GCL Yankees	DSL Yankees	
1991	Columbus Clippers	Albany-Colonie Yankees	Fort Lauderdale Yankees; Prince William Cannons	Greensboro Hornets	Oneonta Yankees	GCL Yankees	DSL Yankees/Mets	
1992	Columbus Clippers	Albany-Colonie Yankees	Fort Lauderdale Yankees; Prince William Cannons	Greensboro Hornets	Oneonta Yankees	GCL Yankees	DSL Yankees/Padres	
1993	Columbus Clippers	Albany-Colonie Yankees	Prince William Cannons	Greensboro Hornets	Oneonta Yankees	GCL Yankees	DSL Yankees/Padres	
1994	Columbus Clippers	Albany-Colonie Yankees	Tampa Yankees	Greensboro Bats	Oneonta Yankees	GCL Yankees	DSL Yankees	
1995	Columbus Clippers	Norwich Navigators	Tampa Yankees	Greensboro Bats	Oneonta Yankees	GCL Yankees	DSL Yankees	
1996	Columbus Clippers	Norwich Navigators	Tampa Yankees	Greensboro Bats	Oneonta Yankees	GCL Yankees	DSL Yankees	
1997	Columbus Clippers	Norwich Navigators	Tampa Yankees	Greensboro Bats	Oneonta Yankees	GCL Yankees	Melbourne Reds; DSL Yankees	
1998	Columbus Clippers	Norwich Navigators	Tampa Yankees	Greensboro Bats	Oneonta Yankees	GCL Yankees	DSL Yankees	
1999	Columbus Clippers	Norwich Navigators	Tampa Yankees	Greensboro Bats	Staten Island Yankees	GCL Yankees	DSL Yankees	
2000	Columbus Clippers	Norwich Navigators	Tampa Yankees	Greensboro Bats	Staten Island Yankees	GCL Yankees	DSL Yankees	
2001	Columbus Clippers	Norwich Navigators	Tampa Yankees	Greensboro Bats	Staten Island Yankees	GCL Yankees	DSL Yankees	
2002	Columbus Clippers	Norwich Navigators	Tampa Yankees	Greensboro Bats	Staten Island Yankees	GCL Yankees	DSL Yankees 1 DSL Yankees 2	
2003	Columbus Clippers	Trenton Thunder	Tampa Yankees	Battle Creek Yankees	Staten Island Yankees	GCL Yankees	DSL Yankees 1 DSL Yankees 2	
2004	Columbus Clippers	Trenton Thunder	Tampa Yankees	Battle Creek Yankees	Staten Island Yankees	GCL Yankees	DSL Yankees 1 DSL Yankees 2	
2005	Columbus Clippers	Trenton Thunder	Tampa Yankees	Charleston RiverDogs	Staten Island Yankees	GCL Yankees	DSL Yankees 1 DSL Yankees 2	
2006	Columbus Clippers	Trenton Thunder	Tampa Yankees	Charleston RiverDogs	Staten Island Yankees	GCL Yankees	DSL Yankees 1 DSL Yankees 2	
2007	Scranton/Wilkes-Barre Yankees	Trenton Thunder	Tampa Yankees	Charleston RiverDogs	Staten Island Yankees	GCL Yankees	DSL Yankees 1 DSL Yankees 2	
2008	Scranton/Wilkes-Barre Yankees	Trenton Thunder	Tampa Yankees	Charleston RiverDogs	Staten Island Yankees	GCL Yankees	DSL Yankees 1 DSL Yankees 2	
2009	Scranton/Wilkes-Barre Yankees	Trenton Thunder	Tampa Yankees	Charleston RiverDogs	Staten Island Yankees	GCL Yankees	DSL Yankees 1 DSL Yankees 2	
2010	Scranton/Wilkes-Barre Yankees	Trenton Thunder	Tampa Yankees	Charleston RiverDogs	Staten Island Yankees	GCL Yankees	DSL Yankees 1 DSL Yankees 2	
2011	Scranton/Wilkes-Barre Yankees	Trenton Thunder	Tampa Yankees	Charleston RiverDogs	Staten Island Yankees	GCL Yankees	DSL Yankees 1 DSL Yankees 2	
2012	Scranton/Wilkes-Barre Yankees	Trenton Thunder	Tampa Yankees	Charleston RiverDogs	Staten Island Yankees	GCL Yankees	DSL Yankees 1 DSL Yankees 2	
2013	Scranton/Wilkes-Barre RailRiders	Trenton Thunder	Tampa Yankees	Charleston RiverDogs	Staten Island Yankees	GCL Yankees 1 GCL Yankees 2	DSL Yankees 1 DSL Yankees 2	
2014	Scranton/Wilkes-Barre RailRiders	Trenton Thunder	Tampa Yankees	Charleston RiverDogs	Staten Island Yankees	GCL Yankees 1 GCL Yankees 2	DSL Yankees 1 DSL Yankees 2	
2015	Scranton/Wilkes-Barre RailRiders	Trenton Thunder	Tampa Yankees	Charleston RiverDogs	Staten Island Yankees	Pulaski Yankees; GCL Yankees 1 GCL Yankees 2	DSL Yankees 1 DSL Yankees 2	
2016	Scranton/Wilkes-Barre RailRiders	Trenton Thunder	Tampa Yankees	Charleston RiverDogs	Staten Island Yankees	Pulaski Yankees; GCL Yankees East; GCL Yankees West	DSL Yankees 1 DSL Yankees 2	
2017	Scranton/Wilkes-Barre RailRiders	Trenton Thunder	Tampa Yankees	Charleston RiverDogs	Staten Island Yankees	Pulaski Yankees; GCL Yankees East; GCL Yankees West	DSL Yankees	
2018	Scranton/Wilkes-Barre RailRiders	Trenton Thunder	Tampa Tarpons	Charleston RiverDogs	Staten Island Yankees	Pulaski Yankees; GCL Yankees East; GCL Yankees West	DSL Yankees	
2019	Scranton/Wilkes-Barre RailRiders	Trenton Thunder	Tampa Tarpons	Charleston RiverDogs	Staten Island Yankees	Pulaski Yankees; GCL Yankees East; GCL Yankees West	DSL Yankees	
2020 (Note: The 2020 Minor League Baseball season was cancelled due to the COVID-19 pandemic.)	Scranton/Wilkes-Barre RailRiders	Trenton Thunder	Tampa Tarpons	Charleston RiverDogs	Staten Island Yankees	Pulaski Yankees; GCL Yankees East; GCL Yankees West	DSL Yankees	

=== 2021–present ===
The current structure of Minor League Baseball is the result of an overall contraction of the system beginning with the 2021 season. Class A was reduced to two levels: High-A and Low-A. Low-A was reclassified as Single-A in 2022.

Season	Triple-A	Double-A	High-A	Single-A	Rookie	Foreign Rookie	Ref.
2021	Scranton/Wilkes-Barre RailRiders	Somerset Patriots	Hudson Valley Renegades	Tampa Tarpons	FCL Yankees	DSL Yankees 1 DSL Yankees 2	
2022	Scranton/Wilkes-Barre RailRiders	Somerset Patriots	Hudson Valley Renegades	Tampa Tarpons	FCL Yankees	DSL Bombers; DSL Yankees	
2023	Scranton/Wilkes-Barre RailRiders	Somerset Patriots	Hudson Valley Renegades	Tampa Tarpons	FCL Yankees	DSL Bombers; DSL Yankees	
2024	Scranton/Wilkes-Barre RailRiders	Somerset Patriots	Hudson Valley Renegades	Tampa Tarpons	FCL Yankees	DSL Bombers; DSL Yankees	
2025	Scranton/Wilkes-Barre RailRiders	Somerset Patriots	Hudson Valley Renegades	Tampa Tarpons	FCL Yankees	DSL Bombers; DSL Yankees	
2026	Scranton/Wilkes-Barre RailRiders	Somerset Patriots	Hudson Valley Renegades	Tampa Tarpons	FCL Yankees	DSL Yankees	

== See also ==
- New York Yankees minor league players
