= New York Yankees minor league players =

Below is a partial list of Minor League Baseball players in the New York Yankees system.

== Players ==
=== Omar Alfonzo ===
Omar Alfonzo
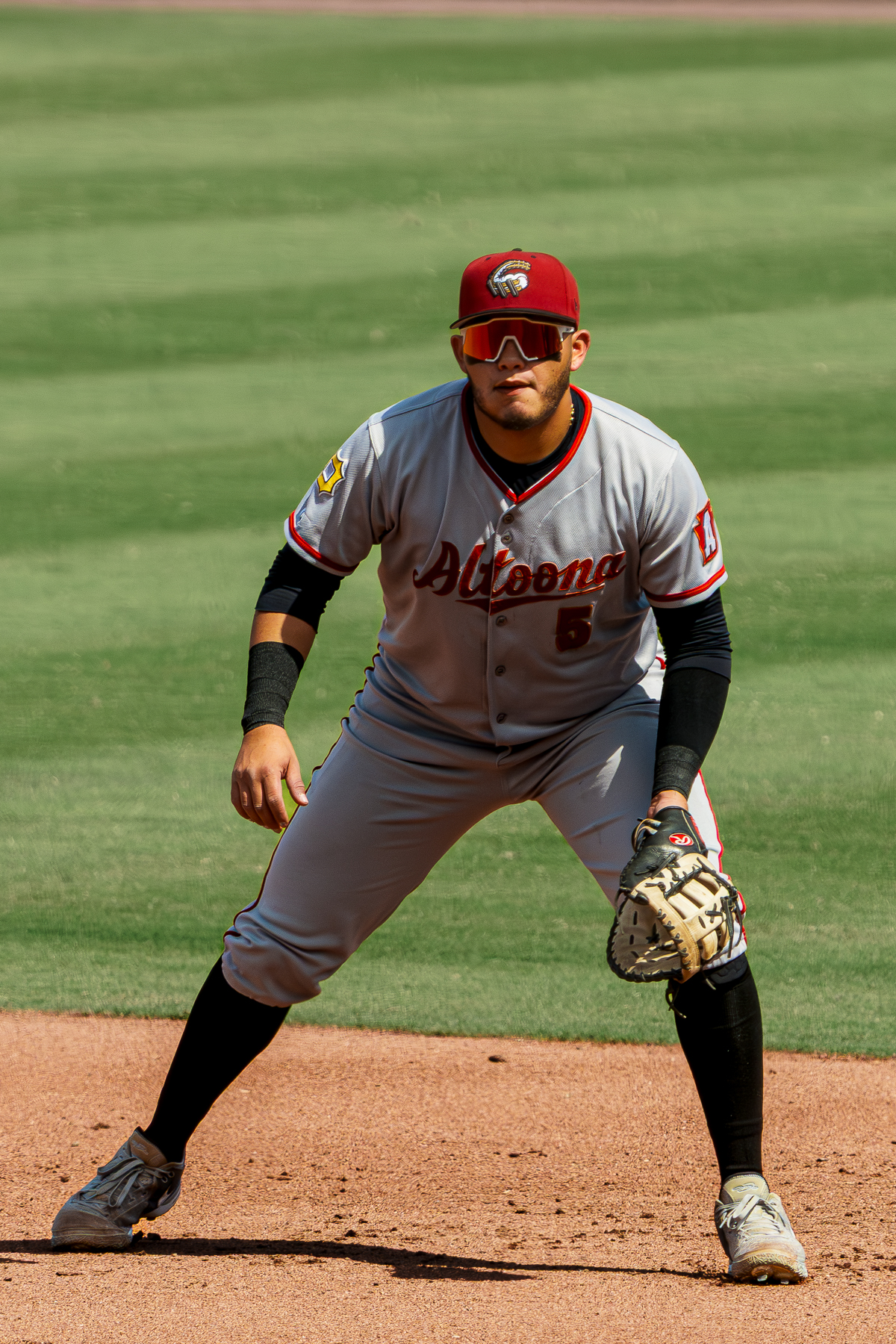
- Alfonzo with the Altoona Curve in 2026

New York Yankees
- Catcher
- Born: August 3, 2003 (age 23); Minneapolis, Minnesota, U.S.
- Bats: Left Throws: Right

Omar Eliezer Alonfzo (born August 3, 2003) is a Venezuelan-American professional baseball catcher in the New York Yankees organization.

Alfonzo grew up in both Minneapolis and in Venezuela. He signed with the Pittsburgh Pirates as a free agent in 2019. He made his professional debut in 2021 with the Dominican Summer League Pirates and hit .232 with two home runs over 39 games. Alfonzo spent the 2022 season with the Florida Complex League Pirates and batted .144 over 33 games.

Alfonzo played the 2023 season in the Complex League and also played with the Bradenton Marauders, batting .275 with five home runs and 42 runs batted in (RBI) over sixty games. In 2024, he started the season with Bradenton and was promoted to the Greensboro Grasshoppers in August. Over 110 games, he hit .252 with 13 home runs and 46 RBI. He opened the 2025 season with Greensboro and was promoted to the Altoona Curve during the season. Alfonzo played in a total of 116 games and batted .243 with 14 home runs and 56 RBI. He was a non-roster invitee to 2026 spring training. He was assigned back to Altoona to open the season and also completed rehab assignments with the FCL Pirates and Bradenton.

On August 1, 2026, the Pirates traded Alfonzo and Luis Cruz to the New York Yankees in exchange for Camilo Doval. The Yankees assigned him to the Somerset Patriots. Across 88 games played in 2026, Alfonzo hit .200 with ten home runs and 45 RBI.

Alfonzo's father, Eliézer Alfonzo, played in MLB for six seasons.

- Career statistics from Baseball Reference (Minors)

=== Roderick Arias ===
Roderick Arias

New York Yankees
- Shortstop
- Born: September 9, 2004 (age 22); San Pedro de Macoris, Dominican Republic
- Bats: Switch Throws: Right

Roderick Manuel Arias (born September 9, 2004) is a Dominican professional baseball shortstop in the New York Yankees organization.

Arias was ranked as the top international free agent in the 2022 class. He signed with the New York Yankees in January 2022 for $4 million.

Arias made his professional debut in 2022 with the Dominican Summer League Yankees, and played 2023 with the Florida Complex League Yankees.

- Career statistics from Baseball Reference (Minors)

=== Jace Avina ===
Jace Avina

New York Yankees
- Outfielder
- Born: June 6, 2003 (age 23); Reno, Nevada, U.S.
- Bats: Right Throws: Right

Jace Aiden Avina (born June 6, 2003) is an American professional baseball outfielder in the New York Yankees organization.

Avina attended Spanish Springs High School in Sparks, Nevada. He was selected by the Milwaukee Brewers in the 14th round of the 2021 Major League Baseball draft. He signed with the Brewers, forgoing his commitment to play college baseball at the University of Nevada.

Avina made his professional debut in 2022 with the Rookie-level Arizona Complex League Brewers and was promoted to the Single-A Carolina Mudcats during the season. Over 64 games between both teams, he hit .271 with 15 home runs and 54 RBI. Avina played the 2023 season with Carolina and batted .233 with 14 home runs and 50 RBI across 99 games.

On November 17, 2023, Avina (alongside Brian Sánchez) was traded to the New York Yankees in exchange for Jake Bauers. For the 2024 season, he was assigned to the High-A Hudson Valley Renegades and hit .245 with 10 home runs and 49 RBI over 92 games. Avina was assigned to Hudson Valley to open the 2025 season and was later promoted to the Double-A Somerset Patriots. Over 98 games between both teams, he batted .260 with 11 home runs and 45 RBI. Avina was assigned back to Somerset for the 2026 season. He was named Eastern League Player of the Month for May. Over 119 games with Somerset, Avina hit .254 with 21 home runs and 68 RBI.

- Career statistics from Baseball Reference (Minors)

=== Brendan Brock ===
Brendan Brock

New York Yankees
- Catcher
- Born: August 3, 2004 (age 22); Belleville, Illinois, U.S.
- Bats: Right Throws: Right

Career highlights and awards
- College World Series champion (2026)

Brendan Joseph Brock (born August 3, 2004) is an American professional baseball catcher in the New York Yankees organization.

Brock attended Mascoutah High School in Mascoutah, Illinois, where he played for the school's baseball team through 2022.

He enrolled at Southwestern Illinois College in Belleville to play college baseball. Brock redshirted his freshman year due to an injury. In 2024, he hit .398/.517/.825 with 15 home runs. In his 2025 campaign, he improved to hit .462/.565/.870 and 20 home runs, becoming the program's all-time home run leader. In the summer of 2025, he played collegiate summer baseball for the Thrillville Thrillbillies of the Prospect League.

Brock was selected by the Milwaukee Brewers in the 14th round of the 2025 Major League Baseball draft, but chose not to sign and instead choosing to transfer to Oklahoma.

In 2026, Brock hit .302/.399/.522 with 13 home runs and 28 stolen bases in 66 games (65 starts) for the Sooners as a catcher and outfielder. He helped Oklahoma win the 2026 College World Series, hitting 6th in the batting order. He was considered one of the top prospects for the 2026 Major League Baseball draft.

The Yankees selected Brock in the third round of the 2026 draft and signed him for an under-slot signing bonus of $789.8 thousand.

- Career statistics from Baseball Reference (Minors)
- Oklahoma Sooners bio

=== Kyle Carr ===
Kyle Carr

New York Yankees
- Pitcher
- Born: May 6, 2002 (age 24); La Jolla, California, U.S.
- Bats: Left Throws: Left

Kyle Isiah Carr (born May 6, 2002) is an American professional baseball pitcher for the New York Yankees of Major League Baseball (MLB).

Carr attended San Marcos High School in San Marcos, California, where he played for the school's baseball team as a two-way player. He had Tommy John surgery in October 2020. Carr pitched to a 12–1 win–loss record with a 2.31 earned run average (ERA) and 111 strikeouts in 78 innings pitched.

Carr enrolled at the University of San Diego to play college baseball for the San Diego Toreros. He took a redshirt in 2021. In 2022, he had a 6.19 ERA in 16 innings pitched and batted 2-for-14 (.143) as a designated hitter. He broke a hand in February 2022. In 2022, he played collegiate summer baseball with the Orleans Firebirds of the Cape Cod Baseball League. He transferred to Palomar College for the 2023 college season. For Palomar, he had a 12–1 record and a 2.31 ERA. Carr committed to transfer to Texas Christian University for the 2024 season.

The Yankees selected him in the third round of the 2023 MLB draft. In 2024, he played for the Hudson Valley Renegades of the Class A-Advanced South Atlantic League.

On November 17, 2026, He had his contract selected to the 40-man roster to protect him from the Rule 5 draft.

- Career statistics from Baseball Reference (Minors)

=== Carson Coleman ===
Carson Coleman

New York Yankees
- Pitcher
- Born: April 7, 1998 (age 28); Lexington, Kentucky, U.S.
- Bats: Right Throws: Right

Carson Cavanagh Coleman (born April 7, 1998) is an American professional baseball pitcher in the New York Yankees organization.

Coleman attended Lexington Catholic High School in Lexington, Kentucky and played college baseball at the University of Kentucky. In 2018 and 2019, he played collegiate summer baseball with the Brewster Whitecaps of the Cape Cod Baseball League. He was drafted by the Tampa Bay Rays in the 33rd round of the 2019 Major League Baseball draft, but did not sign and returned to Kentucky for another season. He signed with the New York Yankees as an undrafted free agent after he was not selected in the 2020 Major League Baseball draft, which was shortened because of the COVID-19 pandemic.

Coleman spent his professional debut season of 2021 with the Tampa Tarpons, going 2–3 with a 6.11 ERA and 49 strikeouts over 35 1/3 innings. He split the 2022 season between the Hudson Valley Renegades and the Somerset Patriots, going a combined 2–3 with a 2.13 ERA and 95 strikeouts over 63 1/3 innings. Coleman underwent Tommy John surgery in April 2023, and missed the entire season.

On December 6, 2023, Coleman was selected by the Texas Rangers in the Rule 5 draft. He did not appear for the organization as he continued to recover from surgery. On November 19, 2024, Coleman was returned to the New York Yankees organization.

On June 5, 2026, Coleman threw the final two innings of a combined no-hitter, which was started by Brendan Beck. In total in 2026 he played in 37 games (1 start) with Triple-A Scranton/Wilkes-Barre Railriders throwing 44 innings going 1–0 with a 7.98 ERA with 44 strikeouts and 3 saves.

- Career statistics from MLB · ESPN · Baseball Reference (Minors)
- Kentucky Wildcats bio

=== Bryce Cunningham ===
Bryce Cunningham

New York Yankees
- Pitcher
- Born: December 30, 2002 (age 23); Headland, Alabama, U.S.
- Bats: Right Throws: Right

Bryce Allen Cunningham (born December 20, 2002) is an American professional baseball pitcher in the New York Yankees organization.

Cunningham attended Headland High School in Headland, Alabama. As a senior in 2021, he had a 0.76 earned run average (ERA) with 77 strikeouts over 46 innings. Cunningham played college baseball at Vanderbilt University from 2022 to 2024. During his college career he started 26 of 46 games, going 11–8 with a 4.95 ERA and 168 strikeouts over 160 innings. In 2022 and 2023, he played collegiate summer baseball with the Bourne Braves of the Cape Cod Baseball League and was named a league all-star in both seasons.

Cunningham was selected by the New York Yankees in the second round of the 2024 Major League Baseball draft. He made his professional debut in 2025 with the Hudson Valley Renegades.

- Career statistics from Baseball Reference (Minors)

=== Allen Facundo ===
Allen Facundo

New York Yankees
- Pitcher
- Born: September 3, 2002 (age 24); Vargas, Venezuela
- Bats: Left Throws: Left

Allen Haybertson Alberto Facundo (born September 3, 2002) is a Venezuelan professional baseball pitcher in the New York Yankees organization.

Facundo signed with the New York Yankees as an international free agent in May 2021. He made his professional debut that year with the Dominican Summer League Yankees. After missing the 2022 season due to injury, he returned in 2023 to pitch for the Florida Complex League Yankees.

Facundo started the 2024 season with the Tampa Tarpons before undergoing season-ending Tommy John Surgery. He returned in 2025 to play for the FCL Yankees and Tampa. Facundo started 2026 with Tampa before being promoted to the Hudson Valley Renegades.

- Career statistics from Baseball Reference (Minors)

=== Rory Fox ===
Rory Fox

New York Yankees
- Pitcher
- Born: February 3, 2004 (age 22); Milwaukee, Wisconsin, U.S.
- Bats: Right Throws: Right

Rory Owen Fox (born February 3, 2004) is an American professional baseball pitcher in the New York Yankees organization.

Fox attended Catholic Memorial High School in Waukesha, Wisconsin, where he played baseball, football and basketball. He played college baseball for the Notre Dame Fighting Irish.

Fox was selected by the New York Yankees in the sixth round of the 2025 Major League Baseball draft. He made his professional debut in 2026 with the Hudson Valley Renegades before being promoted to the Somerset Patriots.

- Career statistics from Baseball Reference (Minors)

=== Thatcher Hurd ===
Thatcher Hurd

New York Yankees
- Pitcher
- Born: December 9, 2002 (age 23); Berkeley, California, U.S.
- Bats: Right Throws: Right

Thatcher Hurd (born December 9, 2002) is an American professional baseball pitcher in the New York Yankees organization.

Hurd attended Acalanes High School in Lafayette, California, where he was a catcher, before transferring to Mira Costa High School in Manhattan Beach, California, where he pitched. He played college baseball for the UCLA Bruins his freshman year before transferring to play for the LSU Tigers for his sophomore and junior years. He started game 3 of the Tigers' 2023 College World Series final championship. In 2024, he played collegiate summer baseball with the Cotuit Kettleers of the Cape Cod Baseball League.

Hurd was selected by the New York Yankees in the third round of the 2024 Major League Baseball draft. He had Tommy John Surgery in February 2025 and missed the season. He returned from the injury in 2026 and started the year with Florida Complex League Yankees before being promoted to the Tampa Tarpons after three starts.

- Career statistics from Baseball Reference (Minors)

=== Core Jackson ===
Core Jackson

New York Yankees
- Shortstop
- Born: October 11, 2003 (age 23); Sarnia, Ontario, Canada
- Bats: Left Throws: Right

James William Core Jackson (born October 11, 2003) is a Canadian professional baseball shortstop in the New York Yankees organization.

Jackson attended Lambton Central Collegiate & Vocational Institute in Petrolia, Ontario, Canada. He played college baseball at the University of Nebraska–Lincoln for one year before transferring to the University of Utah, where he played two years.

Jackson was selected by the New York Yankees in the fifth round of the 2025 Major League Baseball draft. He made his professional debut that season with the Hudson Valley Renegades and started 2026 with them.

- Career statistics from Baseball Reference (Minors)

=== Dax Kilby ===
Dax Kilby

New York Yankees
- Shortstop
- Born: November 17, 2006 (age 20); Newnan, Georgia, U.S.
- Bats: Left Throws: Right

Dax Akin Kilby (born November 17, 2006) is an American professional baseball shortstop in the New York Yankees organization.

Kilby attended Newnan High School in Newnan, Georgia. As a senior, he batted .495 with five home runs and 42 runs batted in (RBI). He committed to play college baseball at Clemson University.

Kilby was selected by the New York Yankees 39th overall in the 2025 Major League Baseball draft. On July 19, 2025, Kilby signed with the Yankees for a $2.8 million signing bonus.

Kilby made his professional debut with the Single-A Tampa Tarpons and batted .353 with six RBI and 16 stolen bases across 18 games. Kilby opened the 2026 season on the injured list with a hamstring strain suffered during spring training.

- Career statistics from Baseball Reference (Minors)

=== Carlos Lagrange ===
Carlos Lagrange

New York Yankees
- Pitcher
- Born: May 25, 2003 (age 23); Bayaguana, Dominican Republic
- Bats: Right Throws: Right

Carlos Jefferson Lagrange (born May 25, 2003) is a Dominican professional baseball pitcher for the New York Yankees of Major League Baseball (MLB).

Lagrange signed with the New York Yankees as an international free agent in February 2022. He made his professional debut that year with the Dominican Summer League Yankees.

Lagrange pitched 2023 with the Florida Complex League Yankees and 2024 with the FCL Yankees and Tampa Tarpons. After the 2024 season he pitched in the Arizona Fall League. He started 2025 with the Hudson Valley Renegades.

On June 2, 2026, Yankees manager Aaron Boone announced that Lagrange would pitch primarily out of the bullpen for the remainder of the season. On July 4, Lagrange was shut down for six weeks due to a capsular sprain in his throwing shoulder. On November 17, 2026, He had his contract selected to the 40-man roster to protect him from the Rule 5 draft.

- Career statistics from Baseball Reference (Minors)

=== Jackson Lovich ===
Jackson Lovich

New York Yankees
- Infielder
- Born: November 18, 2003 (age 23); Overland Park, Kansas, U.S.
- Bats: Right Throws: Right

Jackson David Lovich (born November 18, 2003) is an American professional baseball infielder in the New York Yankees organization.

Lovich attended Blue Valley West High School in Overland Park, Kansas. He was selected by the New York Mets in the 19th round of the 2022 Major League Baseball draft, but did not sign and played college baseball at the University of Missouri.

After three years at Missouri, he was selected by the New York Yankees in the 16th round of the 2025 MLB draft. He made his professional debut that season with the Tampa Tarpons and returned their to start 2026.

- Career statistics from Baseball Reference (Minors)

=== Sean Paul Liñan ===
Sean Paul Liñan

New York Yankees
- Pitcher
- Born: November 7, 2004 (age 22); Cartagena, Colombia
- Bats: Right Throws: Right

Sean Paul Liñan (born November 7, 2004) is a Colombian professional baseball pitcher in the New York Yankees organization.

Liñan signed with the Los Angeles Dodgers as an international free agent in January 2022. He made his professional debut that year with the Dominican Summer League Dodgers.

Liñan pitched 2023 with the Arizona Complex League Dodgers and 2024 with the ACL Dodgers and Rancho Cucamonga Quakes. He started 2025 with Rancho Cucamonga and was promoted to the Great Lakes Loons in May. At the time of his promotion, he was leading the minor leagues in strikeouts.

On July 31, 2025, the Dodgers traded Liñan and Eriq Swan to the Washington Nationals in exchange for Alex Call.

On March 22, 2026, the Nationals traded Liñan to the New York Yankees in exchange for Jorbit Vivas.

- Career statistics from Baseball Reference (Minors)

=== Travis MacGregor ===
Travis MacGregor
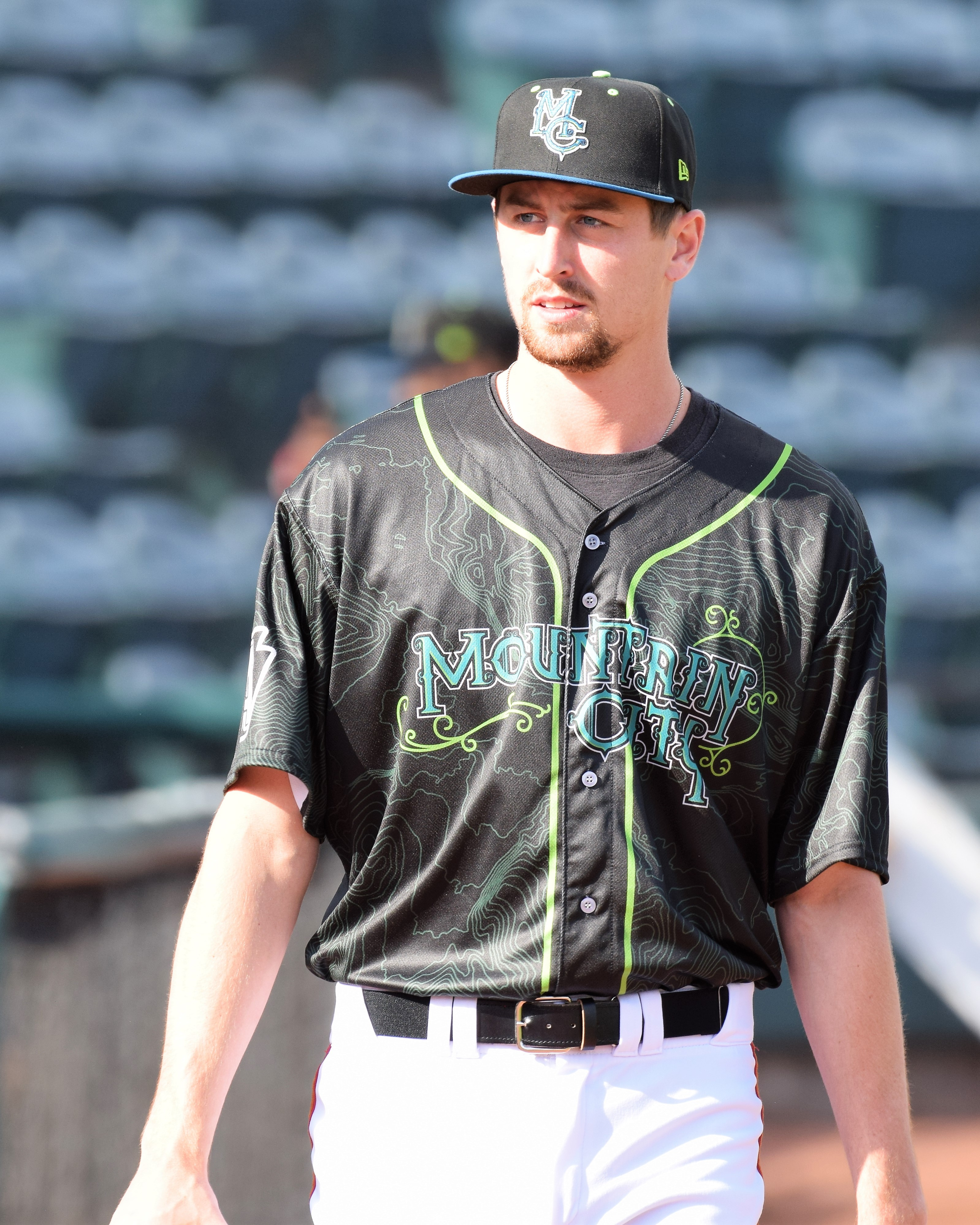
- MacGregor with the Altoona Curve in 2022

Free agent
- Pitcher
- Born: October 15, 1997 (age 29); Tarpon Springs, Florida, U.S.
- Bats: Right Throws: Right

Travis Slayden MacGregor (born October 15, 1997) is an American professional baseball pitcher who is a free agent.

MacGregor attended East Lake High School in Tarpon Springs, Florida. As a senior in 2016, he posted a 0.92 ERA with 82 strikeouts over 54 innings.

MacGregor was drafted by the Pittsburgh Pirates in the second round, with the 68th overall selection, of the 2016 Major League Baseball draft. He signed for $900,000, forgoing his commitment to play college baseball at Clemson University.

MacGregor made his professional debut with the Gulf Coast League Pirates, going 1–1 with a 3.13 ERA over 31 2/3 innings. He spent the 2017 season with the Bristol Pirates with whom he started 12 games and went 1–4 with a 7.84 ERA over 41 1/3 innings. He played 2018 with the West Virginia Power and started 15 games, going 1–4 with a 3.25 ERA and 74 strikeouts over 63 2/3 innings.

He sat out the 2019 season after undergoing Tommy John surgery, and also did not play in 2020 due to the cancellation of the minor league season because of the COVID-19 pandemic.

MacGregor returned to play in 2021 with the Altoona Curve and went 4–9 with a 6.25 ERA over 21 starts, striking out 88 batters over 90 2/3 innings. MacGregor opened the 2022 season with Altoona in their starting rotation but was later moved to the bullpen. In late June, he was promoted to the Indianapolis Indians. Over 38 games (three starts) between the two teams, he went 6–4 with a 5.22 ERA and 103 strikeouts over 81 innings.

On November 10, 2022, MacGregor elected free agency. On March 9, 2023, he re–signed with the Pirates on a minor league contract. He finished the season with a 3.82 ERA and 84 strikeouts in 77 2/3 innings between Double-A Altoona and Triple-A Indianapolis. MacGregor elected free agency again following the season on November 6.

On December 4, 2023, MacGregor signed a minor league contract with the Los Angeles Angels. He was assigned to the Triple–A Salt Lake Bees. MacGregor was released by the Angels organization on July 4, 2024. He re–signed with the organization on July 11. He played the entirety of the 2024 season with the Triple–A Salt Lake Bees, with whom he compiled a 3.61 ERA with 73 strikeouts across 82 1/3 innings pitched in relief. MacGregor elected free agency following the season on November 4.

On February 3, 2025, MacGregor signed a minor league contract with the Texas Rangers. In 36 relief appearances for the Double-A Frisco RoughRiders, he logged an 0–3 record and 5.31 ERA with 44 strikeouts and two saves across 40 2/3 innings pitched. MacGregor was released by the Rangers organization on July 29.

On August 9, 2025, MacGregor signed a minor league contract with the Milwaukee Brewers organization. He made 11 appearances for the Double-A Biloxi Shuckers, posting an 0–3 record and 3.48 ERA with 11 strikeouts and three saves across 10 1/3 innings pitched. MacGregor elected free agency following the season on November 6.

On December 12, 2025, MacGregor signed a minor league contract with the New York Yankees. In 2026, he played rehab assignments with the Single-A Tampa Tarpons and High-A Hudson Valley Renegades before he was assigned to the Triple-A Scranton/Wilkes-Barre RailRiders. He appeared in 14 games and had a 0.86 ERA and 21 strikeouts over 21 innings. He elected free agency on November 2.

- Career statistics from Baseball Reference (Minors)

=== Garrett Martin ===
Garrett Martin

New York Yankees
- Outfielder
- Born: May 28, 2000 (age 26); Arlington, Texas, U.S.
- Bats: Right Throws: Right

Garrett Mason Martin (born June 28, 2000) is an American professional baseball outfielder for the New York Yankees of Major League Baseball (MLB).

Martin Standley Lake High School in Westminster, Colorado. He was selected by the Baltimore Orioles in the 22nd round of the 2019 Major League Baseball draft, but did not sign. He played college baseball at Oklahoma State University, McLennan Community College and Austin Peay State University.

Martin signed with the New York Yankees after going unselected in the 2023 MLB draft. After the 2024 season, he played in the Arizona Fall League, where he won the Fall League Home Run Derby. After the 2026 season, the Yankees added him to their 40-man roster.

- Career statistics from Baseball Reference (Minors)

=== Ernesto Martínez Jr. ===
Ernesto Martínez Jr.

Free agent
- First baseman
- Born: June 20, 1999 (age 27); Holguin, Cuba
- Bats: Left Throws: Left

Ernesto Wilson Martínez Jr. (born June 20, 1999) is a French-Cuban professional baseball first baseman who is a free agent.

In 2016, Martínez played for the France national baseball team in the 2016 World Baseball Classic Qualifiers as the youngest player on the team.

Martínez signed with the Milwaukee Brewers as an international free agent on May 27, 2017. He made his professional debut that season with the Dominican Summer League Brewers. Martínez split the ensuing season with the rookie-level Arizona League Brewers, hitting .224 with 10 RBI in 35 games; in 2019, he hit .262 with six home runs and 25 RBI over 48 appearances for the rookie-level Rocky Mountain Vibes. Martínez did not play in a game in 2020 due to the cancellation of the minor league season because of the COVID-19 pandemic.

Martínez returned to action in 2021 with the Single-A Carolina Mudcats, batting .274/.370/.492 with 11 home runs, 48 RBI, and 30 stolen bases across 79 games. In 2022, he played in 28 games for the rookie-level Arizona Complex League Brewers and High-A Wisconsin Timber Rattlers, slashing .244/.412/.474 with five home runs, 17 RBI, and eight stolen bases. Martínez made 98 appearances for Wisconsin and the Double-A Biloxi Shuckers in 2023, batting a cumulative .261/.345/.415 with 12 home runs, 44 RBI, and 16 stolen bases.

Martínez returned to Biloxi for the 2024 campaign, batting .284/.365/.466 with 13 home runs, 62 RBI, and 20 stolen bases across 110 appearances. He was assigned to the Triple-A Nashville Sounds to begin the 2025 season, ultimately playing in 80 games and hitting .255/.357/.388 with six home runs and 40 RBI. Martínez elected free agency following the season on November 6, 2025.

On December 12, 2025, Martínez Jr. signed a minor league contract with the New York Yankees that included an invitation to spring training. He elected free agency on November 2.

Martínez is a polyglot, possessing the ability to speak English, Spanish, French, and Haitian Creole.

- Career statistics from Baseball Reference (Minors)

=== Brando Mayea ===
Brando Mayea

New York Yankees
- Outfielder
- Born: September 12, 2005 (age 21); Havana, Cuba
- Bats: Right Throws: Right

Brando Mayea is a Cuban professional baseball outfielder in the New York Yankees organization.

Mayea was born in Cuba. He primarily played shortstop as a youth before being moved to the outfield.

Mayea was signed by the New York Yankees on January 16, 2023, and received a $4.35 million signing bonus.

- Career statistics from MLB · Fangraphs · Baseball Reference (Minors)

=== Zach Messinger ===
Zach Messinger

New York Yankees
- Pitcher
- Born: October 4, 1999 (age 27); Chandler, Indiana, U.S.
- Bats: Right Throws: Right

Zachary Joseph Messinger (born October 4, 1999) is an American professional baseball pitcher for the New York Yankees organization.

Messinger attended John H. Castle High School in Newburgh, Indiana, and the University of Virginia, where he played college baseball for the Virginia Cavaliers. He had a 5–3 win–loss record and a 4.42 earned run average in 51 appearances in his three seasons at Virginia. He helped the Cavaliers reach the 2021 College World Series.

The New York Yankees selected Messinger in the 13th round, with the 393rd overall selection, in the 2021 MLB draft. He signed with the Yankees, receiving a $225,000 signing bonus. He made his professional debut in 2022 with the Tampa Tarpons. He pitched for the Hudson Valley Renegades in 2023. In 2024, he pitched for the Somerset Patriots.

- Career statistics from Baseball Reference (Minors)

=== Yostin Peña ===
Yostin Peña

New York Yankees
- Outfielder
- Born: October 19, 2007 (age 19); Santo Domingo, Dominican Republic
- Bats: Right Throws: Right

Yostin Antonio Peña (born October 19, 2007) is a Dominican professional baseball outfielder in the New York Yankees organization.

Peña originally signed with the St. Louis Cardinals as an international free agent in January 2025, however the contract was voided due to age discrepancies and he became a free agent. In December 2025, he signed with the New York Yankees.

Peña made his professional debut in 2026 with the Dominican Summer League Yankees, and was promoted to the Tampa Tarpons after hitting .375 with eight home runs, 47 runs batted in and 27 stolen bases over 37 games.

- Career statistics from Baseball Reference (Minors)

=== Brock Selvidge ===
Brock Selvidge

New York Yankees
- Pitcher
- Born: August 28, 2002 (age 24); Carrolton, Texas, U.S.
- Bats: Right Throws: Left

Joshua Brock Selvidge (born August 28, 2002) is an American professional baseball pitcher in the New York Yankees organization.

Selvidge attended Hamilton High School in Chandler, Arizona. As a junior in 2020, he was named the Gatorade Baseball Player of the Year for Arizona. Selvidge was drafted by the New York Yankees in the third round of the 2021 Major League Baseball draft. He signed with the Yankees rather than playing college baseball at Louisiana State University (LSU), and made his professional debut that season with the rookie-level Florida Complex League Yankees.

Selvidge pitched 2022 with the FCL Yankees and played 2023 with the Single-A Tampa Tarpons before being promoted to the High-A Hudson Valley Renegades.

On March 11, 2026, it was announced that Selvidge had undergone a season-ending internal brace procedure to repair the ulnar collateral ligament in his left elbow.

- Career statistics from Baseball Reference (Minors)

=== Cade Smith ===
Cade Smith

New York Yankees
- Pitcher
- Born: April 9, 2002 (age 24); Germantown, Tennessee, U.S.
- Bats: Left Throws: Right

Jason Cade Smith (born April 9, 2002) is an American professional baseball pitcher in the New York Yankees organization.

Smith attended DeSoto Central High School in Southaven, Mississippi and played college baseball at Mississippi State University. In 2021, he played collegiate summer baseball with the Bourne Braves of the Cape Cod Baseball League. He was selected by the New York Yankees in the sixth round of the 2023 Major League Baseball draft.

Smith spent his first professional season in 2024 with the Tampa Tarpons and Hudson Valley Renegades.

- Career statistics from Baseball Reference (Minors)

=== Danny Watson ===
Danny Watson

New York Yankees
- Pitcher
- Born: October 6, 2000 (age 26); Albany, New York, U.S.
- Bats: Right Throws: Right

Daniel Scott Watson (born October 6, 2000) is an American professional baseball pitcher in the New York Yankees organization.

Watson attended Columbia High School in East Greenbush, New York and played college baseball at Virginia Commonwealth University. He was drafted by the New York Yankees in the 15th round of the 2021 Major League Baseball draft.

Watson signed with the Yankees and made his professional debut with the Tampa Tarpons and played 2022 with them. He started 2023 with the Hudson Valley Renegades before being promoted to the Somerset Patriots.

- Career statistics from Baseball Reference (Minors)

== Full Triple-A to Rookie League rosters ==
=== Triple-A ===
Scranton/Wilkes-Barre Highlanders roster
Players		Coaches/Other
Pitchers: 39 Will Brian; 38 Carson Coleman; -- Luis García; 16 Brian Hendry; 41 Chris Kean; 19 Hayden Merda; 29 Zach Messinger; 28 Eric Reyzelman; 33 Xavier Rivas; 31 Danny Watson	Catchers: 21 Edinson Duran; 12 Christian Rodriguez *; Infielders: 36 Tyler Hardman; 6 Connor McGinnis; Outfielders: 30 Max Schuemann *	Manager: Vacant; Coaches: 47 Raul Dominguez (defense); 88 Pete Larson (bullpen); 28 Michael Mergenthaler (hitting); 56 Spencer Medick (pitching); 45 Gil Velazquez (bench); 7-day injured list; * On New York Yankees 40-man roster; ~ Development list; # Rehab assignment; ∞ Reserve list; ‡ Restricted list; § Suspended list; † Temporarily inactive list; Roster updated November 17, 2026; Transactions; → More rosters: MiLB • International League; → New York Yankees minor league players

=== Double-A ===
Somerset Patriots roster
Players		Coaches/Other
Pitchers: 19 Kelly Austin; 23 Harrison Cohen; 38 Bryce Cunningham; 22 Rory Fox; 20 Geoffrey Gilbert; 27 Dom Hamel; 26 Ben Hess; 7 Matt Keating; 21 Brady Kirtner; 8 Hueston Morrill; 30 Yerry Rodríguez; 32 Tony Rossi; 29 Trent Sellers; 24 Brock Selvidge; 15 Cade Smith; 18 Kevin Stevens; 33 Chris Veach	Catchers: 50 Omar Alfonzo; 17 Manuel Palencia; Infielders: 4 Roderick Arias; 11 Core Jackson; 3 Josh Moylan; 4 Duncan Pastore; 2 Kevin Verde; Outfielders: 1 Jace Avina; 9 Jackson Castillo; 5 Cole Gabrielson; 13 Coby Morales	Manager: 24 James Cooper; Coaches: 50 Michael Fransoso (hitting); 14 Caleb Hamilton (defensive); 40 Demetre Kokoris (pitching); 8 Uziel Viloria (defense); 7-day injured list; * On New York Yankees 40-man roster; ~ Development list; # Rehab assignment; ∞ Reserve list; ‡ Restricted list; § Suspended list; † Temporarily inactive list; Roster updated November 2, 2026; Transactions; → More rosters: MiLB • Eastern League; → New York Yankees minor league players

=== High-A ===
Hudson Valley Renegades roster
Players		Coaches/Other
Pitchers: 31 Thomas Balboni Jr.; 27 Brandon Decker; 35 Allen Facundo; 25 Danny Flatt; 8 Franyer Herrera; 20 Pico Kohn; 4 Andrew Landry; 0 Sean Paul Liñan; 36 Hansel Rincon; 17 Jose M. Rodriguez; 26 Wilmy Sanchez; 19 Luis Serna; 29 Jack Sokol; 17 Luis Velasquez; 43 Bryce Warrecker	Catchers: 13 Eric Genther; 3 Josue Gonzalez; 23 Diomedes Hernandez; 11 David McCann; Infielders: 18 Jackson Lovich; 1 Bryce Martin-Grudzielanek; 6 Hans Montero; 7 Enmanuel Tejeda; 39 Kyle West; Outfielders: 2 Robbie Burnett; 12 Gabriel Lara; 22 Willy Montero; 9 Maika Niu; 14 Wilson Rodriguez; 28 Dean Toigo; 15 Camden Troyer; 24 Tyler Wilson	Manager: 93 Aaron Bossi; Coaches: 5 Chase Gerbrick (defensive); 44 Scott Nestor (hitting); 41 Ryan Mossman (pitching); 7-day injured list; * On New York Yankees 40-man roster; ~ Development list; # Rehab assignment; ∞ Reserve list; ‡ Restricted list; § Suspended list; † Temporarily inactive list; Roster updated November 2, 2026; Transactions; → More rosters: MiLB • South Atlantic League; → New York Yankees minor league players

=== Single-A ===
Tampa Tarpons roster
Players		Coaches/Other
Pitchers: 36 Rafael Arias; 8 Tyler Boudreau; 35 Greysen Carter; 39 J.T. Etheridge; 52 Mac Heuer; 31 Thatcher Hurd; 17 Jose Ledesma; 11 Edinzo Marquez; 38 Sabier Marte; 41 Jose Martinez; 6 Anthony Mena; 40 Jordarlin Mendoza; 51 Wyatt Parliament; 21 Luke Pettitte (two way); 26 Brennan Stuprich; 24 Josh Tiedemann; 30 Matthew Tippie; 25 Justin West	Catchers: 28 Gregory Bozzo; 33 Antonio Gomez; 40 Bear Harrison; 1 Luis Puello; 15 Ediel Rivera; Infielders: 44 Tyce Armstrong; 22 Luis Escudero; 2 Austin Green; 3 Dax Kilby; 29 Anthony Potestio; 27 Blake Schaaf; Outfielders: -- Richie Bonomolo Jr.; 2 Diego Castellanos; 7 Blake Cyr; 18 Wilberson De Pena; 20 Paul Gutierrez-Contreras II; 11 JoJo Jackson; 12 Brando Mayea; 27 Yostin Peña	Manager: 24 Zak Wasserman; Coaches: 53 Gerardo Casadiego (pitching); 50 Carlos Mendez (hitting); 19 Ben Somorjai (hitting); 4 Josciel Veras (defensive); 7-day injured list; * On New York Yankees 40-man roster; ~ Development list; # Rehab assignment; ∞ Reserve list; ‡ Restricted list; § Suspended list; † Temporarily inactive list; Roster updated November 2, 2026; Transactions; → More rosters: MiLB • Florida State League; → New York Yankees minor league players

=== Rookie ===
Florida Complex League Yankees roster
Players		Coaches/Other
Pitchers: -- Garrett Ahern; 72 Jerson Alejandro; 40 Alexander Almonte; 45 Chalniel Arias; -- Angel Benitez; -- Austin Berggren; -- Austin Breedlove; 47 Manuel Cruz; -- Hunter Dietz; -- Sean Duncan; 58 Mack Estrada; -- Orvis Fernandez; -- Tijn Fredrikze; 38 Blake Gillespie; 27 Omar Gonzalez; -- Michael Harpster; -- A.J. Hutcheson; -- Zach Johnston; -- Jason Krieger; -- Chien-Fan Lai; -- David Leslie; 14 Jorge Luna; 50 Marco Manzano; 55 Sunayro Martina; -- Josh Newell; -- Tommy O'Rourke; -- Ryan Osinski; 30 Mariano Salomon; 33 Enixon Sanchez; -- Payton Soske; -- Max Vaisvila	Catchers: -- Brendan Brock; 19 Justin Capellan; 12 Diego Flores; 13 Queni Pineda; 64 Carlos Rondon; -- Engelth Urena; 62 Carlos Villarroel; Infielders: -- William Cutshall; 34 Leni Done; -- Andrew Gonzalez; -- Bayram Hot; 26 Richard Matic; 24 Dexters Peralta; -- Tyce Peterson; Outfielders: 25 Jose Castro; -- Lee Garris; -- Jorxist Jimenez; 35 Estivenzon Montero; 57 Francisco Vilorio	Manager: -- Santiago Nessy; Coaches: -- Cole Gambill (hitting); 34 Steven Klimek (pitching); -- Dylan Moser (hitting); 61 Antonio Pacheco (defensive); 45 Alexander Rosario (pitching); 13 Drew Spencer (defensive); 7-day injured list; * On New York Yankees 40-man roster; ~ Development list; # Rehab assignment; ∞ Reserve list; ‡ Restricted list; § Suspended list; † Temporarily inactive list; Roster updated November 2, 2026; Transactions; → More rosters: MiLB • Florida Complex League; → New York Yankees minor league players

=== Foreign Rookie ===
Dominican Summer League NYY Bombers roster
Players		Coaches/Other
Pitchers: 59 Ranciel Abreu; 38 Cesar Acosta; 13 Breidy Adames; 31 Randy Angomas; 31 Andre Avila; -- Hector Cancio; 41 Diego Carrillo; 71 Sebastian Castillo; 68 Osveiker Chirino; 47 Edgar De Leon; 68 Chaury Gomez ‡; 58 Alexis Gonzalez; 61 Brandy Luis; 56 Higor Requena; 63 Jose Sanchez; 59 Junior Tavera; 52 Argenis Veloz	Catchers: 55 Jesus Guerrero; 35 Edgar Jimenez; 29 Kenneth Melendez; 50 Alessandro Rodriguez; Infielders: 25 Carlos Bello; 26 Germayhoni Beltre; 57 Mani Cedeno; 80 Alfred Ciriaco; 62 Dariel Santano; Outfielders: 27 David Carrera; 18 Ruben Castillo; 14 Sebastian Pinto	Manager: -- Teuris Olivares; Coaches: -- Freicer Perez (pitching); -- Selwyn Langaigne (hitting); -- Eduardo Navas (defensive); 7-day injured list; * On New York Yankees 40-man roster; ~ Development list; # Rehab assignment; ∞ Reserve list; ‡ Restricted list; § Suspended list; † Temporarily inactive list; Roster updated November 3, 2026; Transactions; → More rosters: MiLB • Dominican Summer League; → New York Yankees minor league players

Dominican Summer League NYY Yankees roster
Players		Coaches/Other
Pitchers: 48 Jhon Beltre; 82 Dariel Chalas; 95 Jhosneyker Colina; 94 Victor De Leon; 12 Yefreiny De Paula; -- Felipe Hernandez; 73 Luis Ilarraza; 53 Braulio Jaquez; 36 Yunior Jerez; 86 Freddy Lopez; 79 Hector Moreno; 78 Fredy Penuelas; 91 Sebastian Rivas; 98 Brandon Rodriguez; 81 Luis Rodriguez; 93 Angel Salazar; 96 Dalvin Taveras; 74 Jose Vargas	Catchers: 53 Jose Lavagnino; 75 Cesar Lopez; 89 Juan Martinez; 85 Poly Ojeda; 88 Jose Peralta; 22 Stalen Ramirez; Infielders: 19 Adrian Feliz; 24 Stiven Martinez; 33 Abrahan Pichardo; 77 Juan Torres; Outfielders: 76 Manuel Aguilar; 66 Isaias Castillo; -- Luis Cruz; 87 Kendry Diaz; 90 Alfiery Matos	Manager: -- Carlos Vidal; Coaches: -- Nelson B. Alvarez (hitting); -- Juan Crisp (defensive); -- Edwar Ramirez (pitching); 7-day injured list; * On New York Yankees 40-man roster; ~ Development list; # Rehab assignment; ∞ Reserve list; ‡ Restricted list; § Suspended list; † Temporarily inactive list; Roster updated November 3, 2026; Transactions; → More rosters: MiLB • Dominican Summer League; → New York Yankees minor league players

== See also ==
- List of New York Yankees minor league affiliates
