= Florida Complex League Yankees =

- (1964–1966, 1980–present); Tampa, Florida

Minor league affiliations
- Class: Rookie
- League: Florida Complex League
- Division: North
- Previous leagues: Gulf Coast League (1966, 1980–2020); Florida Rookie League (1965); Sarasota Rookie League (1964)

Major league affiliations
- Team: New York Yankees

Minor league titles
- League titles (13): 1966; 1982; 1985; 1988; 1989; 1996; 2001; 2004; 2005; 2007; 2011; 2017; 2022
- Division titles (17): 1985; 1988; 1989; 1996; 1997; 2000; 2001; 2004; 2005; 2007; 2011; 2013**; 2014*; 2021; 2022; 2023; 2024; *GCL Yankees 1 title; **GCL Yankees 2 title

Team data
- Name: FCL Yankees
- Previous names: GCL Yankees East & West (2016–2020); GCL Yankees 1 & 2 (2013–2015); GCL Yankees (1966, 1980–2012); FRL Yankees (1965); SRL Yankees (1964)
- Ballpark: George M. Steinbrenner Field (2004–present)
- Owner/ Operator: New York Yankees
- Manager: Ryan Chipka

The Florida Complex League Yankees are a Rookie-level affiliate of the New York Yankees, competing in the Florida Complex League of Minor League Baseball. The team is composed mainly of players who are in their first year of professional baseball either as selections from the Major League Baseball draft or as non-drafted free agents. The team plays its home games at George M. Steinbrenner Field in Tampa, Florida. Prior to 2021, the team was known as the Gulf Coast League Yankees, and fielded two squads in several seasons, differentiated by suffixes. The team (or one of its two squads) has won the league championship 13 times, most recently in 2022.

== History ==
The Yankees originally fielded a team in the Sarasota Rookie League and the Florida Rookie League in 1964 and 1965, which were direct predecessors to the Gulf Coast League (GCL). The team competed in the GCL during 1966, then was absent from the league through 1979. Since 1980, the team has fielded at least one squad in the league each season.

In 2013, the Yankees began fielding two squads in the league, originally differentiated by "1" and "2" suffixes. The suffixes were changed to "East" and "West" in 2016, as the squads played in the Northeast and Northwest division, respectively. In 2019, both teams moved into the North Division. The Yankees returned to fielding a single squad in 2021.

== Season-by-season ==
| Year | Record | Finish | Manager | Playoffs |
|---|---|---|---|---|
SRL Yankees
| 1964 | 24–35 | 4th | Bill Shantz | |
FRL Yankees
| 1965 | 17–42 | 6th | Chuck Boone | |
GCL Yankees
| 1966 | 32–16 | 1st | Dick Berardino | League Champs; No playoffs until 1983 |
| 1980 | 27–35 | 7th | Carlos Tosca | |
| 1981 | 30–29 | 7th | Carlos Tosca | |
| 1982 | 42–21 | 1st | Carlos Tosca | League Champs |
| 1984 | 28–35 | 8th | Jack Gillis | |
| 1985 | 43–18 | 1st | Carlos Tosca | League Champs; Playoff game vs. GCL Rangers rained out. Yankees declared champions based on record |
| 1986 | 33–29 | 4th (t) | Fred Ferreira | |
| 1987 | 31–32 | 7th | Fred Ferreira | |
| 1988 | 45–18 | 1st | Brian Butterfield | League Champs vs. GCL Royals (1 game to 0) |
| 1989 | 41–22 | 1st | Jack Gillis | League Champs vs. GCL Dodgers (2 games to 1) |
| 1990 | 32–30 | 8th (t) | Glenn Sherlock | |
| 1991 | 27–32 | 11th | Ken Dominguez | |
| 1992 | 31–28 | 6th | Gary Denbo | |
| 1993 | 30–29 | 9th | Glenn Sherlock | |
| 1994 | 26–32 | 8th | Hector Lopez | |
| 1995 | 32–26 | 8th (t) | Hector Lopez | |
| 1996 | 37–21 | 2nd | Ken Dominguez | League Champs vs. GCL Rangers (2 games to 0); Won in 1st round vs. GCL Expos (1 game to 0) |
| 1997 | 40–20 | 2nd | Ken Dominguez | Lost in 1st round vs. GCL Mets (1 game to 0) |
| 1998 | 34–26 | 3rd (t) | Ken Dominguez | |
| 1999 | 32–28 | 5th | Ken Dominguez | |
| 2000 | 38–22 | 3rd | Derek Shelton | Lost League Finals vs. GCL Rangers (2 games to 1); Won in 1st round vs. GCL Marlins (1 game to 0) |
| 2001 | 35–25 | 4th | Derek Shelton | League Champs vs. GCL Dodgers (2 games to 1); Won in 1st round vs. GCL Red Sox (1 game to 0) |
| 2002 | 36–24 | 3rd | Manny Crespo | |
| 2003 | 26–31 | 8th | Dan Radison | |
| 2004 | 36–23 | 1st | Oscar Acosta | League Champs vs. GCL Red Sox (2 games to 0) |
| 2005 | 33–20 | 2nd | Oscar Acosta | League Champs vs. GCL Mets (2 games to 0); Won in 1st round vs. GCL Red Sox (1 game to 0) |
| 2006 | 33–20 | 3rd | Matt Martin | |
| 2007 | 42–17 | 2nd | Jody Reed | League Champs vs. GCL Dodgers (2 games to 1); Won in 1st round vs. GCL Twins (1 game to 0) |
| 2008 | 31–27 | 7th | Jody Reed | |
| 2009 | 33–27 | 4th | Tom Slater | Lost in 1st round vs. GCL Marlins (1 game to 0) |
| 2010 | 24–32 | 12th (t) | Tom Slater | |
| 2011 | 37–23 | 3rd | Carlos Mendoza | League Champs vs. GCL Marlins; Won in 1st round vs. GCL Orioles (1 game to 0) |
| 2012 | 35–25 | 4th | Tom Nieto | |
GCL Yankees 1 (2013–2020)
| 2013 | 28–32 | 8th (t) | Tom Nieto | |
| 2014 | 38–22 | 1st | Travis Chapman | Lost League title vs. GCL Red Sox (2 games to 1); Won in 1st round vs. GCL Yankees 2 (1 game to 0) |
| 2015 | 26–32 | 12th | Julio Mosquera | |
| 2016 | 19–36 | 17th | Raúl Domínguez | |
| 2017 | 33–27 | 6th | Luis Sojo | League Champs vs. GCL Nationals (2 games to 1); Won in 1st round vs. GCL Phillies (1 game to 0) |
| 2018 | 19-35 | 17th | Edgar Gonzalez | |
| 2019 | 18-29 | 15th | Dan Fiorito | |
| 2020 | N/A | N/A | N/A | Season Cancelled due to the COVID-19 pandemic |
GCL Yankees 2 (2013–2020)
| 2013 | 36–24 | 2nd | Mario Garza | Lost in 1st round vs. GCL Red Sox (1 game to 0) |
| 2014 | 35–25 | 5th | Pat Osburn | Lost in 1st round vs. GCL Yankees 1 (1 game to 0) |
| 2015 | 26–34 | 13th | Marc Bombard | |
| 2016 | 24–31 | 12th (t) | Marc Bombard | |
| 2017 | 32–27 | 7th | Marc Bombard | |
| 2018 | 25-27 | 11th | David Adams | |
| 2019 | 22-27 | 12th | Nick Ortiz | |
| 2020 | N/A | N/A | N/A | Season Cancelled due to the COVID-19 pandemic |
FCL Yankees (2021–present)
| 2021 | 36–16 | 2nd | Tyson Blaser; Julio Borbón | Postseason canceled due to COVID-19 pandemic |

== Roster ==
Florida Complex League Yankees roster
| Players | | Coaches/Other |
|---|---|---|
| Pitchers: -- Garrett Ahern; 72 Jerson Alejandro; 40 Alexander Almonte; 45 Chalniel Arias; -- Angel Benitez; -- Austin Berggren; -- Austin Breedlove; 47 Manuel Cruz; -- Hunter Dietz; -- Sean Duncan; 58 Mack Estrada; -- Orvis Fernandez; -- Tijn Fredrikze; 38 Blake Gillespie; 27 Omar Gonzalez; -- Michael Harpster; -- A.J. Hutcheson; -- Zach Johnston; -- Jason Krieger; -- Chien-Fan Lai; -- David Leslie; 14 Jorge Luna; 50 Marco Manzano; 55 Sunayro Martina; -- Josh Newell; -- Tommy O'Rourke; -- Ryan Osinski; 30 Mariano Salomon; 33 Enixon Sanchez; -- Payton Soske; -- Max Vaisvila | Catchers: -- Brendan Brock; 19 Justin Capellan; 12 Diego Flores; 13 Queni Pineda; 64 Carlos Rondon; -- Engelth Urena; 62 Carlos Villarroel; Infielders: -- William Cutshall; 34 Leni Done; -- Andrew Gonzalez; -- Bayram Hot; 26 Richard Matic; 24 Dexters Peralta; -- Tyce Peterson; Outfielders: 25 Jose Castro; -- Lee Garris; -- Jorxist Jimenez; 35 Estivenzon Montero; 57 Francisco Vilorio | Manager: -- Santiago Nessy; Coaches: -- Cole Gambill (hitting); 34 Steven Klimek (pitching); -- Dylan Moser (hitting); 61 Antonio Pacheco (defensive); 45 Alexander Rosario (pitching); 13 Drew Spencer (defensive); 7-day injured list; * On New York Yankees 40-man roster; ~ Development list; # Rehab assignment; ∞ Reserve list; ‡ Restricted list; § Suspended list; † Temporarily inactive list; Roster updated November 2, 2026; Transactions; → More rosters: MiLB • Florida Complex League; → New York Yankees minor league players |

== Notable alumni ==
Hall of Famers:

- Mariano Rivera (Inducted 2019)
- Derek Jeter (Inducted 2020)
