= Derek Shelton =

American baseball manager (born 1970)

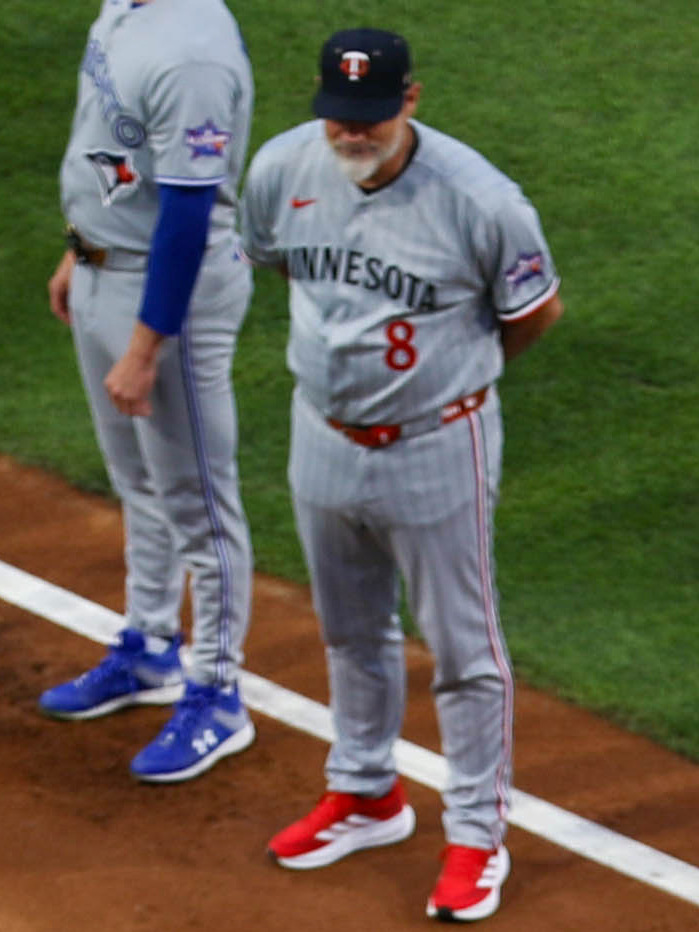
- Shelton at the 2026 MLB All-Star Game

Minnesota Twins – No. 8
- Manager / Coach
- Born: July 30, 1970 (age 56); Carbondale, Illinois, U.S.
- Bats: Right Throws: Right

Career statistics (through September 19, 2026)
- Managerial record: 378–522
- Winning %: .420
- Stats at Baseball Reference
- Managerial record at Baseball Reference

Teams
- As manager: Pittsburgh Pirates (2020–2025); Minnesota Twins (2026–present); As coach: Cleveland Indians (2005–2009); Tampa Bay Rays (2010–2016); Toronto Blue Jays (2017); Minnesota Twins (2018–2019)

Derek Lee Shelton (born July 30, 1970) is an American professional baseball manager who currently serves as the manager for the Minnesota Twins of Major League Baseball (MLB). After his playing career in the New York Yankees organization ended in 1993, he coached and managed within the Yankees minor league system between 1997 and 2002. He then served as a minor league hitting coordinator for the Cleveland Indians starting in 2003.

Shelton was the hitting coach for the Cleveland Indians from 2005 until 2009, and the Tampa Bay Rays from 2010 until 2016. Shelton then worked as the quality control coach for the Toronto Blue Jays in 2017. He was the bench coach for the Minnesota Twins from 2018 through 2019. He was then hired to be the manager of the Pittsburgh Pirates from 2020 to 2025. Shelton was hired prior to the 2026 season as the 15th manager of the Minnesota Twins.

== Amateur and collegiate career ==
Shelton's father coached baseball and freshman basketball while serving as an associate principal at Warren Township High School after his own professional playing career within the Baltimore Orioles organization ended. Shelton received his first set of catcher's equipment at the age of three, and later graduated from Warren, where he played for his father's baseball teams.

After graduating from high school, Shelton attended Southern Illinois University Carbondale where he played college baseball for the Salukis. In his sophomore year (1990), the Salukis won 49 games and the Missouri Valley Conference championship, and played in the NCAA Tournament. Shelton led the Missouri Valley Conference in 1991, his junior year, by throwing out 43% of opposing baserunners attempting to steal. While at SIU, Shelton earned a degree in criminal justice and minored in political science.

== Minor leagues ==
=== Playing career ===
Shelton was a minor league catcher in the New York Yankees organization in 1992 and 1993, advancing from the Short-Season A Oneonta Yankees to the Single-A Greensboro Hornets before an elbow surgery ended his playing career. Shelton played 46 games in his minor league career, and finished with a .341 batting average, one home run, and 19 runs batted in.

=== Coaching career ===
Shelton became a minor league coach in 1997 and managed Yankee minor league teams for three seasons, from 2000 through 2002. His teams achieved a .624 winning percentage, and he won the New York–Penn League championship in 2002 with the Staten Island Yankees.

== Major league coaching career ==
Shelton was the minor league hitting coordinator for the Cleveland Indians organization from 2003, until he replaced major league hitting coach Eddie Murray on an interim basis during the 2005 season. Shelton became the Tampa Bay Rays' hitting coach after the 2009 season. The Rays fired him in September 2016. On December 12, the Toronto Blue Jays hired him as a quality control coach for the 2017 season. On November 6, 2017, the Minnesota Twins hired Shelton as bench coach for the 2018 season.

On November 27, 2019, Shelton was named the manager of the Pittsburgh Pirates. Shelton became the 41st manager in club history. On April 22, 2023, the Pirates announced that Shelton's contract had been extended. On May 8, 2025, the Pirates fired Shelton after a 12–26 start to the season.

On October 29, the Minnesota Twins hired Shelton to be the team's new manager, according to ESPN. The club confirmed his hiring the following day.

=== Managerial record ===
As of July 12, 2026

Team	Year	Regular season					Postseason			
Team	Year	Games	Won	Lost	Win %	Finish	Won	Lost	Win %	Result
PIT	2020	60	19	41	.317	5th in NL Central	–	–	–	–
PIT	2021	162	61	101	.377	5th in NL Central	–	–	–	–
PIT	2022	162	62	100	.383	4th in NL Central	–	–	–	–
PIT	2023	162	76	86	.469	4th in NL Central	–	–	–	–
PIT	2024	162	76	86	.469	5th in NL Central	–	–	–	–
PIT	2025	38	12	26	.316	Fired	–	–	–	–
PIT total		746	306	440	.410		0	0	–	–
MIN	2026	162	77	85	.475	3rd in AL Central	–			
MIN total		162	77	85	.475	–	–			
Total		908	383	525	.421	–	0	0		

== Personal life ==
Shelton and his wife have three children. They live in Treasure Island, Florida. Shelton's parents were teachers. He has a brother.
