= Ben Hess (baseball) =

American baseball player (born 2002)

New York Yankees
- Pitcher
- Born: September 3, 2002 (age 23); Charleston, Illinois, U.S.
- Bats: Right Throws: Right
- Stats at Baseball Reference

Benjamin William Hess (born September 3, 2002) is an American professional baseball pitcher in the New York Yankees organization.

== Amateur career ==
A native of Charleston, Illinois, Hess attended Charleston High School and the University of Alabama, where he played college baseball for the Alabama Crimson Tide. In 2022, he played collegiate summer baseball with the Falmouth Commodores of the Cape Cod Baseball League. As a junior for the Crimson Tide in 2024, Hess started 15 games and had a 5–5 win–loss record with a 5.80 earned run average (ERA) and 106 strikeouts over 68 1/3 innings pitched.

== Professional career ==
Hess was selected by the New York Yankees in the first round, with the 26th overall selection, of the 2024 Major League Baseball draft. On July 24, 2024, Hess signed with the Yankees for a $2.75 million signing bonus.

Hess made his professional debut in 2025 with the Hudson Valley Renegades. In August, he was promoted to the Somerset Patriots. Across 22 starts between both teams, Hess went 7–4 with a 3.22 ERA and 139 strikeouts across 103 1/3 innings. Hess returned to Somerset to open the 2026 season before he was placed on the injured list in mid-April.
