= Tampa Tarpons =

- Founded in 1994; Tampa, Florida
Team logo
Cap insignia

Minor league affiliations
- Class: Single-A (2021–present)
- Previous classes: Class A-Advanced (1994–2020)
- League: Florida State League (1994–present)
- Division: West Division

Major league affiliations
- Team: New York Yankees (1994–present)

Minor league titles
- League titles (5): 1994; 2001; 2004; 2009; 2010
- Division titles (8): 1994; 2001; 2004; 2009; 2010; 2016; 2021; 2026
- Second-half titles (1): 2026

Team data
- Name: Tampa Tarpons (2018–present)
- Previous names: Tampa Yankees (1994–2017)
- Colors: Legends navy, Tarpon silver, Gulf blue, white
- Mascot: King Ripple
- Ballpark: George M. Steinbrenner Field (1996–present); Community Field (2025–present)
- Previous parks: Red McEwen Field (1994–1995)
- Owner/ Operator: New York Yankees
- General manager: Jeremy Ventura
- Manager: Zak Wasserman
- Website: milb.com/tampa

The Tampa Tarpons are a Minor League Baseball team of the Florida State League (FSL) and the Single-A affiliate of Major League Baseball's New York Yankees. Located in Tampa, Florida, they play their home games at George M. Steinbrenner Field, the Spring Training home of the New York Yankees that incorporates design elements from old Yankee Stadium in the Bronx, including identical field dimensions. In 2025, they played home games at an adjacent practice field, Community Field at GMS Field. The Tarpons franchise competed at Class A-Advanced level from 1994 to 2020 before being reclassified to Single-A in 2021. Since their inception, the club has won five league championships, in 1994, 2001, 2004, 2009, and 2010.

The club was established in 1994 as the Tampa Yankees and played for 24 seasons under that name. Before the 2018 season, the team was rebranded as the "Tampa Tarpons", reviving a name that had been used by an earlier franchise in the FSL for over 30 years.

== History ==
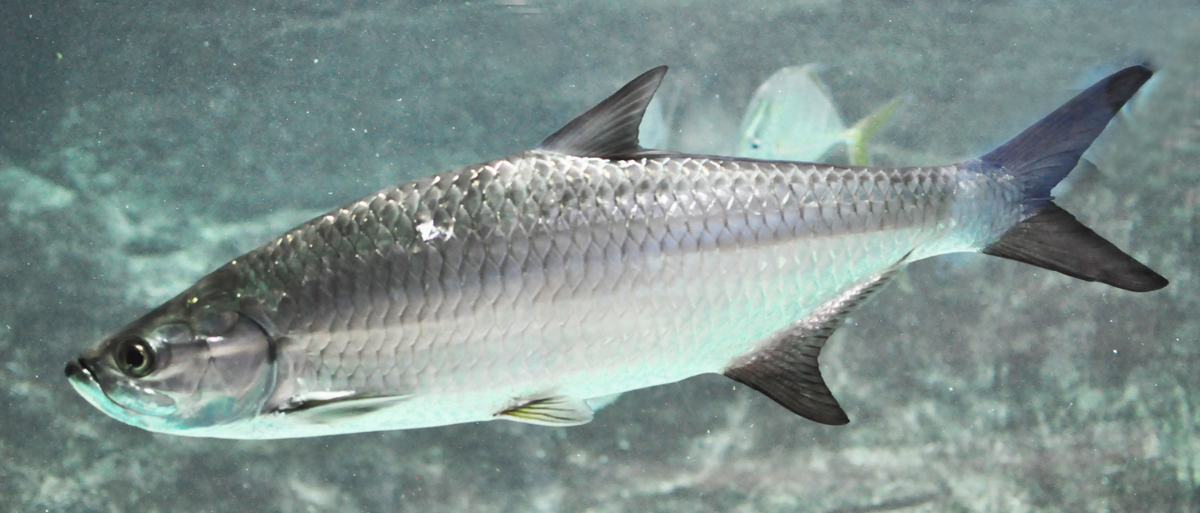
The team is named for the Atlantic tarpon (Megalops atlanticus)

Tampa has a long history of amateur and professional baseball. The city was one of the first to host spring training in 1913, and the Tampa Smokers were charter members of the FSL when it was established in 1919. The original Tampa Tarpons played at Al Lopez Field from 1954 through 1988, mainly as an affiliate of the Cincinnati Reds. The club relocated in 1989 and their ballpark was demolished soon thereafter in anticipation of Tampa being awarded a major league expansion team. However, the Tampa Bay Devil Rays were instead awarded to nearby St. Petersburg, leaving Tampa without a professional baseball team or venue.

In 1994, the New York Yankees established a new Class A-Advanced (renamed High-A in 2021) FSL team and placed them in Tampa, replacing their previous Class-A Advanced affiliate, the Prince William Cannons. After operating as the Tampa Yankees for 24 seasons, the club was rebranded as the Tampa Tarpons in 2018, reviving the name of Tampa's longest-lasting minor league ballclub. For the 2021 season, the FSL was reconfigured as a Low-A circuit, and the Florida State League name was retired, with the circuit being called the Low-A Southeast. In 2022, the Low-A Southeast became known as the Florida State League, the name historically used by the regional circuit prior to the 2021 reorganization, and was reclassified as a Single-A circuit.

On January 9, 2022, the Yankees announced that Rachel Balkovec has been hired to manage the Tarpons. She is the first woman to manage a minor league team affiliated with Major League Baseball.

Notable major league players to once play for the Tampa Yankees / Tarpons include Aaron Judge, Derek Jeter, Rubén Rivera, Mariano Rivera, David Robertson, Joba Chamberlain, Ian Kennedy, Phil Hughes, Ramiro Mendoza, Tim Raines, Eric Milton, and Luis Sojo.

== Ballpark ==
As part of a deal with the city of Tampa, the Tampa Sports Authority agreed to publicly finance a new ballpark for the New York Yankees to use during spring training and the Tampa Yankees to use during the summer. Legends Field has the same dimensions as Yankee Stadium and includes some design elements of the previous ballpark in the Bronx. The Tampa Yankees played their first two seasons (1994 and 1995) at Red McEwen Field on the campus of the University of South Florida while their permanent home was under construction. In 1996, the New York Yankees held spring training at newly completed Legends Field, moving from their long-time spring facilities at Fort Lauderdale, and the Tampa Yankees played at the new ballpark that summer. In 2008, Legends Field was renamed in honor of ailing long-time Yankees owner George Steinbrenner, who lived in Tampa.

Steinbrenner Field has a baseball capacity of about 11,000 and is located across Dale Mabry Highway from the Tampa Bay Buccaneers' home of Raymond James Stadium. The facility has an adjacent parking lot that is sufficient for most minor league crowds, and a pedestrian bridge allows for spring training attendees to park at the football stadium's much larger parking area and safely cross the busy highway to Steinbrenner Field.

In 2025, the Tampa Bay Rays played at Steinbrenner Field due to damage to Tropicana Field from Hurricane Milton. As a result, the Tarpons played their home games at Community Field at GMS Field, a smaller practice field adjacent to Steinbrenner Field, with a capacity of 1,000.

== Playoffs ==
- 2017: Lost to Dunedin 2–1 in semifinals.
- 2016: Lost to Bradenton 3–1 in the FSL finals.
- 2010: Defeated Dunedin 2–0 in semifinals; defeated Charlotte 3–1 to win championship.
- 2009: Defeated Brevard County 2–0 in semifinals; defeated Charlotte 3–2 to win championship.
- 2004: Defeated Dunedin 2–0 in semifinals; declared co-champions with Daytona.
- 2002: Lost to Charlotte 2–0 in semifinals.
- 2001: Defeated Charlotte 2–0 in semifinals; declared co-champions with Brevard County.
- 1998: Defeated Charlotte 2–0 in semifinals; lost to St. Lucie 3–2 in finals.
- 1996: Lost to Clearwater 2–0 in semifinals.
- 1995: Lost to Fort Myers 2–1 in semifinals.
- 1994: Defeated Sarasota 2–1 in semifinals; defeated Brevard County 3–1 to win championship.

== Roster ==
Tampa Tarpons roster
Players		Coaches/Other
Pitchers: 36 Rafael Arias; 8 Tyler Boudreau; 35 Greysen Carter; 39 J.T. Etheridge; 17 Jose Ledesma; 11 Edinzo Marquez; 38 Sabier Marte; 41 Jose Martinez; 6 Anthony Mena; 40 Jordarlin Mendoza; 51 Wyatt Parliament; 21 Luke Pettitte (two way); 47 Pedro Rodriguez; 26 Brennan Stuprich; 24 Josh Tiedemann; 30 Matthew Tippie; 25 Justin West	Catchers: 28 Gregory Bozzo; 33 Antonio Gomez; 40 Bear Harrison; 1 Luis Puello; 15 Ediel Rivera; Infielders: 44 Tyce Armstrong; 22 Luis Escudero; 3 Dax Kilby; 29 Anthony Potestio; 27 Blake Schaaf; Outfielders: 2 Diego Castellanos; 7 Blake Cyr; 18 Wilberson De Pena; 20 Paul Gutierrez-Contreras II; 12 Brando Mayea; 27 Yostin Peña	Manager: 24 Zak Wasserman; Coaches: 53 Gerardo Casadiego (pitching); 50 Carlos Mendez (hitting); 19 Ben Somorjai (hitting); 4 Josciel Veras (defensive); 60-day injured list: -- Richie Bonomolo Jr.; 2 Austin Green (full season); 52 Mac Heuer (full season); 31 Thatcher Hurd; 11 JoJo Jackson; 7-day injured list; * On New York Yankees 40-man roster; ~ Development list; # Rehab assignment; ∞ Reserve list; ‡ Restricted list; § Suspended list; † Temporarily inactive list; Roster updated September 21, 2026; Transactions; → More rosters: MiLB • Florida State League; → New York Yankees minor league players

== Notable people ==
Note: Years indicate service time with the Tampa Yankees / Tarpons, either as a minor leaguer or on an injury rehabilitation assignment

Hall of Fame alumni

- Tim Raines (1996–1997) 7 x MLB All-Star, Inducted 2017
- Mariano Rivera (1994) 13 x MLB All-Star; 1999 World Series Most Valuable Player; All-Time MLB Saves Leader, Inducted 2019 unanimously
- Derek Jeter (1994, 2000) 14 x MLB All-Star; 1996 AL Rookie of the Year; 2000 World Series Most Valuable Player, Inducted 2020
- CC Sabathia (2014, 2019) 6 x MLB All-Star; 2007 AL Cy Young; 2009 ALCS Most Valuable Player, Inducted 2025
- Carlos Beltrán (2015) 9 x MLB All-Star; 1999 AL Rookie of the Year, Inducted 2026

Notable alumni

- John Axford (2007) 2011 NL Saves Leader
- Andrew Bailey (2015) 2 x MLB All-Star; 2009 AL Rookie of the Year
- Dellin Betances (2010) 4 x MLB All-Star
- Melky Cabrera (2004) MLB All-Star
- Robinson Cano (2003) 8 x MLB All-Star
- Francisco Cervelli (2007–2008, 2011, 2014)
- Joba Chamberlain (2007, 2012)
- Tyler Clippard (2005) 2 x MLB All-Star
- Mike DeJean (1994)
- Jacoby Ellsbury (2015) MLB All-Star
- Didi Gregorius (2017, 2019)
- Matt Holliday (2017) 7 x MLB All-Star; 2007 NLCS Most Valuable Player
- Phil Hughes (2005–2006) MLB All-Star
- Nick Johnson (1998)
- Aaron Judge (2014) 2 x MLB All-Star; 2017 AL Rookie of the Year
- Ian Kennedy (2007–2008) 2011 NL Wins Leader
- Ted Lilly (2000) 2 x MLB All-Star
- Adam Lind (2018)
- Mike Lowell (1996) 4 x MLB All-Star; 2007 World Series Most Valuable Player
- Lee Mazzilli (1997–1998, MGR) MLB All-Star
- Eric Milton (1997) MLB All-Star
- Dioner Navarro (2002) MLB All-Star
- Ivan Nova (2008, 2015)
- Carl Pavano (2005–2006) MLB All-Star
- Mark Prior (2011) MLB All-Star
- Juan Rivera (1999–2000, 2005)
- David Robertson (2007) MLB All-Star
- Brendan Ryan (2014–2015)
- Gary Sanchez (2012–2013) 2 x MLB All-Star
- Luis Severino (2014, 2016, 2021) 2 x MLB All-Star
- Luis Sojo (2006–2008, 2009, 2011–2013, MGR)
- Giancarlo Stanton (2019) 4 x MLB All-Star; 2017 NL Most Valuable Player
- Marcus Thames (1999)
- Gleyber Torres (2016, 2018) 2 x MLB All-Star
- Troy Tulowitzki (2019) 5 x MLB All-Star
