= George M. Steinbrenner Field =

Baseball stadium in Tampa, Florida

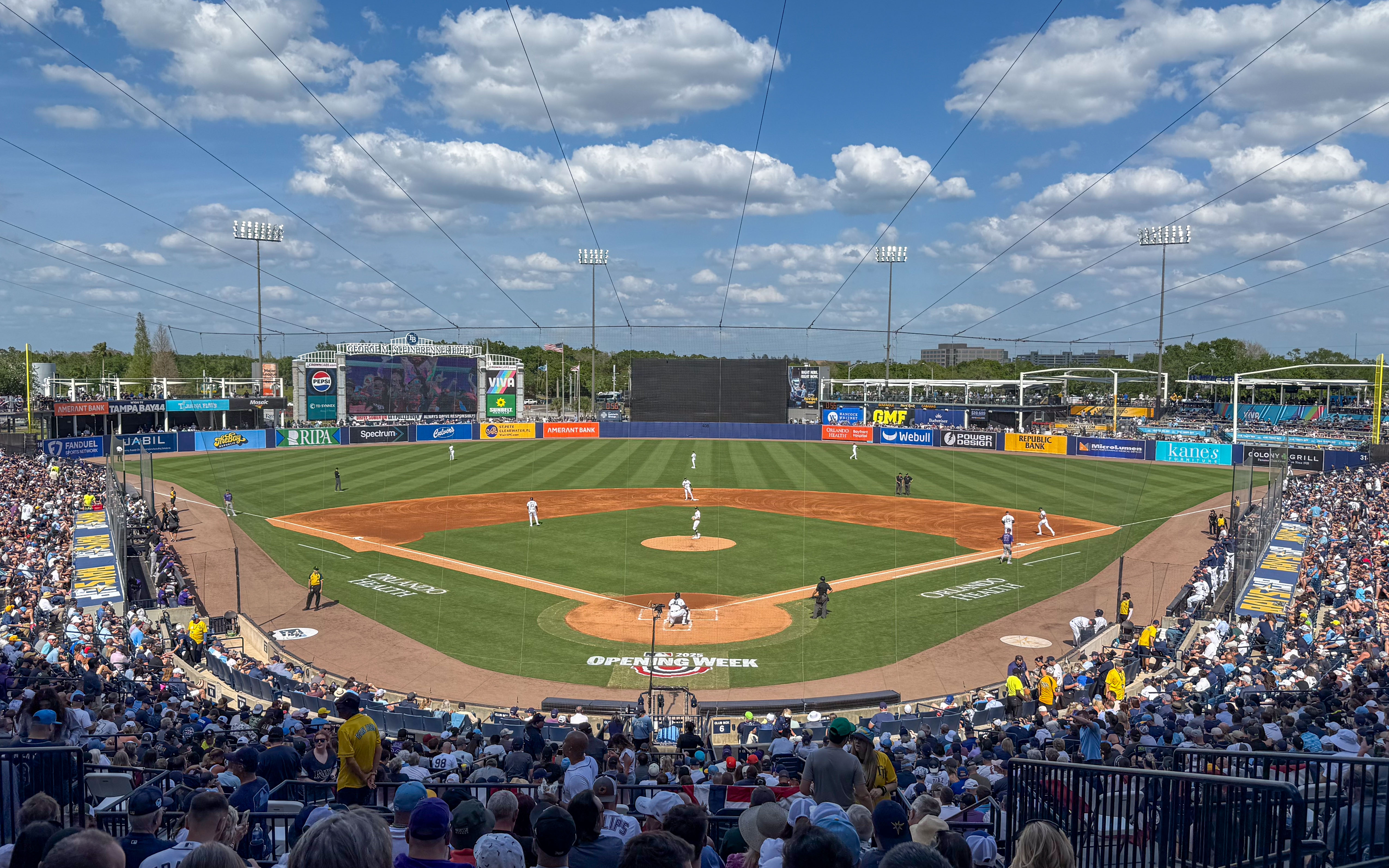
- Steinbrenner Field on Opening Day in 2025
- Interactive map of George M. Steinbrenner Field
- Former names: Legends Field (1996–2008)
- Location: 1 Steinbrenner Drive; Tampa, FL 33614; United States
- Coordinates: 27°58′49″N 82°30′24″W
- Owner: Yankee Global Enterprises
- Operator: New York Yankees
- Capacity: 11,026 (2007–present); 10,200 (1996–2006)
- Surface: Grass
- Field size: Left Field – 318 ft (97 m); Left-Center – 399 ft (122 m); Center Field – 408 ft (124 m); Right-Center – 385 ft (117 m); Right Field – 314 ft (96 m)

Construction
- Groundbreaking: October 22, 1994
- Opened: March 1, 1996
- Renovated: 2016–2017
- Cost: $30 million ($61.6 million in 2025 dollars)
- Architect: Lescher & Mahoney
- Structural engineers: MC Engineers, Inc.
- Services engineer: Colwill Engineering
- General contractor: Case Contracting Company

Tenants
- New York Yankees (MLB) (spring training) (1996–present); Tampa Tarpons (FSL) (1996–present); Florida Complex League Yankees (FCL) (1996–present); FC Tampa Bay (NASL) (2010); Tampa Bay Rays (MLB) (2025)

Website
- gmsfield.com

George M. Steinbrenner Field, formerly known as Legends Field, is a baseball stadium located in Tampa, Florida, across the Dale Mabry Highway from Raymond James Stadium. The ballpark was built in 1996 and seats 11,026 people, with an addition in right field built in 2007. It is the largest spring training ballpark in Florida.

George M. Steinbrenner Field serves as the spring training home of the New York Yankees of Major League Baseball (MLB) and is the home of the Tampa Tarpons, the Yankees' affiliate in the Florida State League.

After extensive damage to Tropicana Field by Hurricane Milton, Steinbrenner Field served as the temporary home field for MLB's Tampa Bay Rays during their 2025 season.

== Background and stadium history ==
Tampa was the first spring training site in Florida, beginning in 1913 with the Chicago Cubs. In the ensuing decades, the city hosted several different Major League Baseball teams for spring training and was home to several different minor league squads during the summer, first at Plant Field near downtown and later at Al Lopez Field near West Tampa. This era came to an end in 1988 when, after almost 30 years in Tampa, the Cincinnati Reds moved to new training facilities in Plant City and transferred operation of the Tampa Tarpons, their local minor league affiliate in the Florida State League, to the Chicago White Sox. In 1989, the Tarpons moved to Sarasota and Al Lopez Field was razed, leaving the city with no professional baseball teams and no large baseball venue.

In 1993, the Tampa Sports Authority announced a deal to build a new spring training stadium for the New York Yankees, who had been conducting spring training in Fort Lauderdale. The original plan was to build the facility on the former site of Al Lopez Field, just south of old Tampa Stadium. However, due to objections from the Buccaneers (who pursued the site for what is now their replacement venue of Raymond James Stadium), the new ballpark was instead built about a half-mile to the northwest, directly across Dale Mabry Highway from Tampa Stadium, displacing a Hillsborough County correctional facility.

The ballpark and the surrounding training complex cost approximately $30 million to build and was financed entirely with public funds, mostly from Hillsborough County. It hosted its first spring training game on March 1, 1996, when the Yankees opened spring training by hosting the Cleveland Indians.

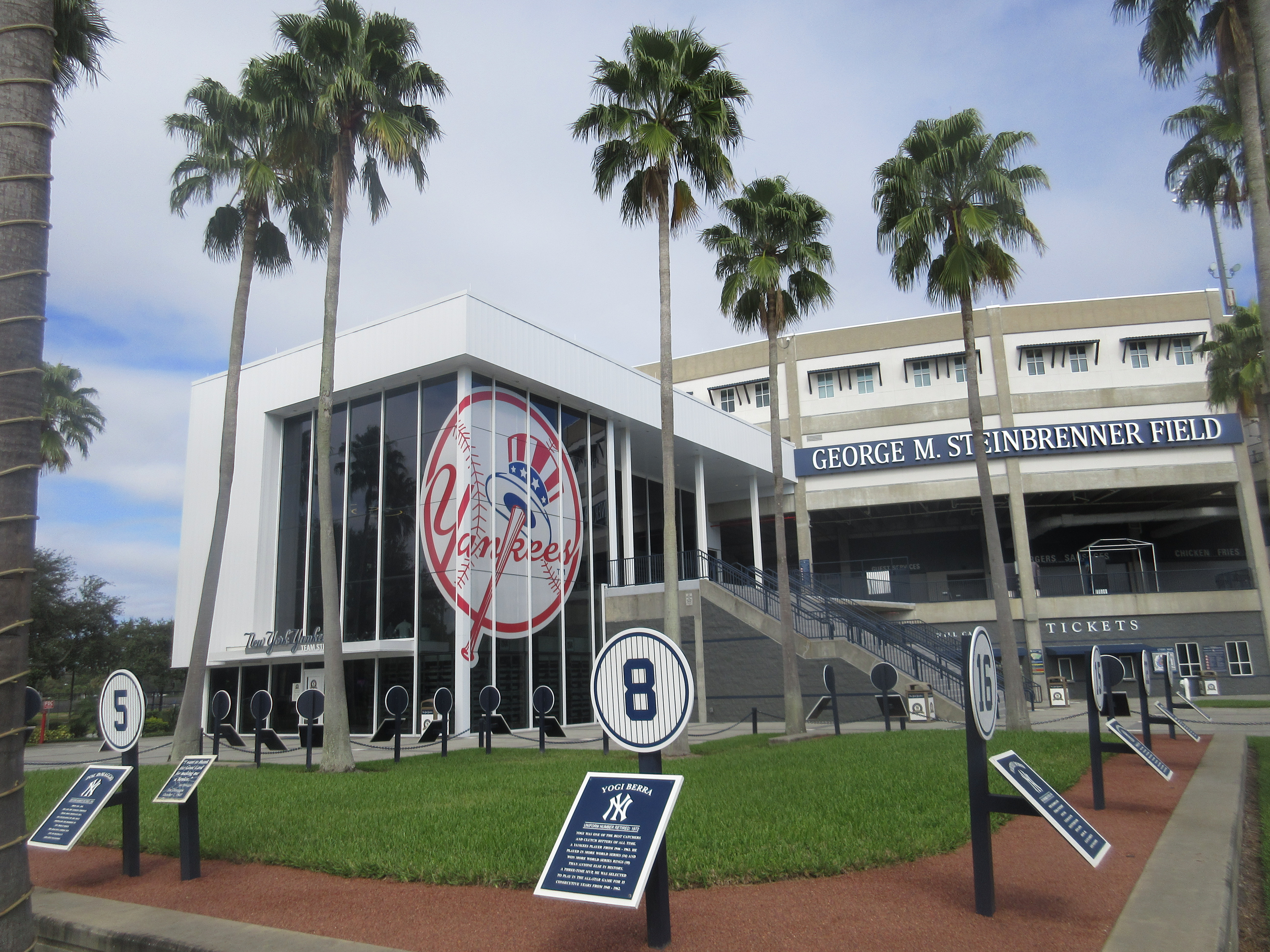
Stadium exterior in 2018

In 2006, Hillsborough County paid for a $7.5 million expansion to add more seats and amenities behind right field. The addition opened in 2008.

The ballpark was known as Legends Field for the first dozen years of its existence. It was renamed in honor of George Steinbrenner, the Yankees' owner and Tampa resident, on March 27, 2008, when Steinbrenner was in failing health. He died in July 2010, and a life-size bronze statue of the late owner was placed in front of the stadium in January 2011.

On April 20, 2016, Hillsborough County commissioners approved a $40 million renovation of George M. Steinbrenner Field, greenlighting an agreement that will keep New York Yankees' spring training in Tampa through 2046. Renovations began after the 2016 season. Improvements included new seats throughout the 10,000-capacity ballpark, roof replacements, a better entry plaza and an upgraded outfield concourse. The renovations also included adding new amenities such as new loge boxes, cabanas, suite upgrades, a right-field beachside bar and bullpen clubs. The bullpen clubs were built on both the first base and the third base side. The clubs are composed of two levels; the top tier is exclusively for group tickets, club seat members and loge seating, while the bottom tier features a full bar that all ticket members can access. Additional shaded areas were constructed to protect fans from the sun. The team's spring training practice facility on Himes Avenue was also upgraded. The renovations were completed in time for Spring Training 2017.

From 2024 to 2025, George M. Steinbrenner Field underwent another renovation with this one focused on player areas with input from manager Aaron Boone and captain Aaron Judge. The former segmented and windowless training facilities have been replaced by an open floor plan with the indoor workout area, outdoor stretching area and recovery, medical and training areas adjacent to each other. The former training room has been converted into a multi-purpose space for team meetings and press conferences. The recovery area has been upgraded with eight training tables, plunge pools, a SwimEx, and a sauna and red-light therapy area. Floor-to-ceiling windows allow natural light into the two-story weight room, with weight training on the ground floor and a cardio area in the elevated loft. Additional upgrades include, a new made-to-order kitchen and cafeteria dedicated to player nutrition that connects to a new 2,400 sq ft (220 m^{2}) patio that overlooks the practice field, known as Field 2 and a new larger lounge that includes multiple televisions and arcade games. Furthermore, the visiting clubhouse was upgraded to MLB standards and Field 2 received new larger light stanchions and upgraded baseball operations technology.

=== Tampa Bay Rays ===
After Hurricane Milton caused extensive damage to Tropicana Field, the regular stadium of the Tampa Bay Rays in nearby St. Petersburg, Florida, in October 2024, the Rays announced they would play their 2025 season at Steinbrenner Field. With a seating capacity of 11,026, Steinbrenner Field was the smallest ballpark in MLB.

Kameron Misner hit a walk-off home run on March 28, 2025 during the Rays' season opener, becoming the first player to homer in a major league game at the stadium. The Rays won their first game at the stadium 3–2 in front of 10,046 fans. The final Rays' game at the stadium was on September 21, 2025 where they won against the Boston Red Sox 7–3 in front of 10,046 fans. Repairs at Tropicana Field were completed in time for the Rays to return for opening day of the 2026 MLB season on April 6, 2026.

== Design ==
The dimensions of the field precisely mimic that of both the old Yankee Stadium and the new Yankee Stadium, and the scalloped grandstand facade (the frieze) is also meant to evoke the old ballpark in the Bronx. When built, it was the first spring training stadium to include luxury suites. Outside of the stadium are plaques commemorating Yankees whose numbers have been retired.

== Other tenants and events ==
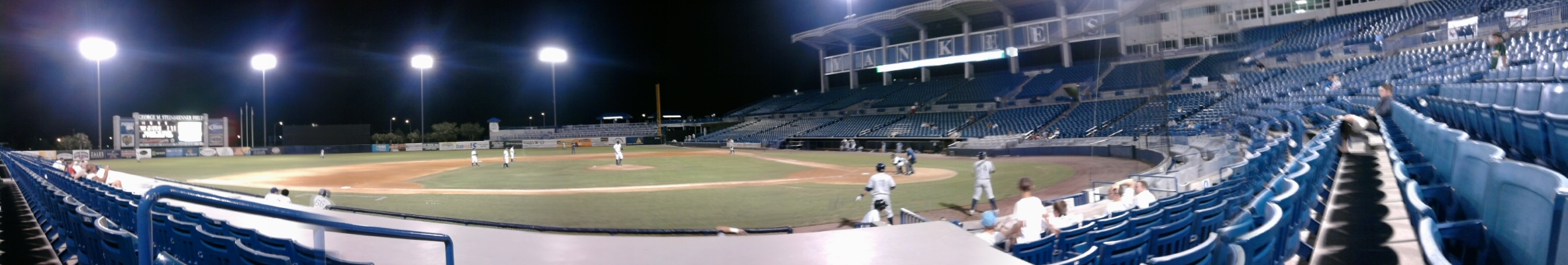
Panoramic view of a Tampa Tarpons game vs. the Charlotte Stone Crabs

In 2008, Barack Obama held a campaign rally at the ballpark with members of the Tampa Bay Rays, including David Price, who introduced him to the crowd.

In 2010, the ballpark was the home pitch for then-called FC Tampa Bay, now the Tampa Bay Rowdies, of the USSF Division 2 Professional League. The club moved across Tampa Bay to Al Lang Field in St. Petersburg for the 2011 season, and has stayed there since.

On August 9, 2014, the venue hosted the "Carnivores Tour" featuring Linkin Park and Thirty Seconds to Mars along with AFI.
