= Somerset Patriots =

- Founded in 1998; Bridgewater Township, New Jersey

Team logo	Cap insignia

Minor league affiliations
- Class: Double-A (2021–present)
- Previous classes: Independent (1998–2020)
- League: Eastern League (2021–present)
- Division: Northeast Division
- Previous leagues: Atlantic League of Professional Baseball (1998–2020)

Major league affiliations
- Team: New York Yankees (2021–present)
- Previous teams: Independent (1998–2020)

Minor league titles
- League titles (7): 2001; 2003; 2005; 2008; 2009; 2015; 2022
- Division titles (16): 1999; 2000; 2001; 2003; 2005; 2007; 2008; 2009; 2013; 2015; 2016; 2017; 2018; 2021; 2022; 2024
- First-half titles (2): 2022; 2023
- Second-half titles (1): 2024
- Wild card berths (1): 2025

Team data
- Name: Somerset Patriots (1998–present)
- Colors: Navy, maroon, silver, white
- Mascot: Sparkee
- Ballpark: TD Bank Ballpark (1999–present)
- Owner/ Operator: The Kalafer Family
- General manager: Patrick McVerry
- Manager: James Cooper
- Media: WCTC 1450 AM and MiLB.TV
- Website: milb.com/somerset

The Somerset Patriots are an American professional Minor League Baseball (MiLB) team based in Bridgewater, New Jersey. They are the Double-A affiliate of the New York Yankees. They compete in the Eastern League (EL), known as the Double-A Northeast in 2021, and were previously members of the independent Atlantic League of Professional Baseball (ALPB) from 1998 to 2020. The Patriots have played their home games at TD Bank Ballpark since 1999.

From 1998 to 2020, the Patriots were the most successful franchise in the Atlantic League. During their twenty-two seasons, they compiled 1,580 regular seasons wins, 47 playoff wins, captured thirteen division titles and six league championship titles in 2001, 2003, 2005, 2008, 2009, and 2015, all league records. Their most recent Atlantic League playoff appearance was in 2018 when they lost in the semifinals against the Long Island Ducks.

Their success continued with the move to the Eastern League in 2021 winning back-to-back division titles in 2021 and 2022 and the 2022 Eastern League Championship.They won the first-half season division title in 2023 and won the 2024 second-half season division title and the division outright en route to the 2024 Eastern League Championship Series.

The "Patriots" name refers to the Middlebrook encampment where the first official flag of the United States was unfurled, after a law to adopt a national flag had been passed by Congress on June 14, 1777. By special order of Congress, a 13-star flag is flown 24 hours a day at the Washington Camp Ground, part of the former Middlebrook encampment, in Bridgewater Township.

== History ==
The Somerset Patriots were one of the founding members of the Atlantic League in 1998. However, the team spent its inaugural season as a road team while TD Bank Park was being constructed. In the 1999 season, the Patriots opened their ballpark, where they quickly became one of the most successful franchises of the league in both the win and attendance columns.

For spring training in 2009, the Somerset Patriots became the first Atlantic League team to hold its spring training in its own locale, at the Jack Cust Baseball Academy in nearby Flemington, instead of the traditional site in Lakeland, Florida. The Lancaster Barnstormers and the York Revolution followed suit in 2009, primarily because of the 2008 financial crisis and the Great Recession.

The Patriots, and then manager Sparky Lyle, won their 1,000th game on July 24, 2012. The Patriots defeated the Sugar Land Skeeters with a score of 6–5, in the day game of a day/night doubleheader.

On November 27, 2012, it was announced Somerset's pitching coach and former major league pitcher, Brett Jodie, would become the new manager with Lyle becoming manager emeritus.

Former professional football player Donald Jones briefly played for the Patriots during his recovery from a kidney transplant.

With the Atlantic League's 2020 season cancelled by the COVID-19 pandemic, Somerset organized a twelve game series called the SOMERSET Professional Baseball Series, which would feature the Patriots and the New Jersey Blasters, a team created for the series. The rosters were composed mostly of players from the state of New Jersey.

In November 2020, the Patriots were announced as the new Double-A affiliate of the New York Yankees, replacing the Trenton Thunder. They were organized into the Double-A Northeast. Somerset began competition in the new league as a Yankees affiliate on May 4 with a 6–0 victory over the Harrisburg Senators at TD Bank Ballpark. They won the 2021 Northeast Division title with a first-place 72–47 record. Despite winning the division, their record was third-best in the league, and only the two teams with the highest winning percentages in the regular season competed for the league championship. Oswaldo Cabrera won the league's Most Valuable Award. In 2022, the Double-A Northeast became known as the Eastern League, the name historically used by the regional circuit prior to the 2021 reorganization.

On September 28, 2022, the Patriots won their first Eastern League Championship and seventh league championship overall with a 15–0 combined no-hitter victory over the Erie SeaWolves at TD Bank Ballpark.

== Season-by-season results ==
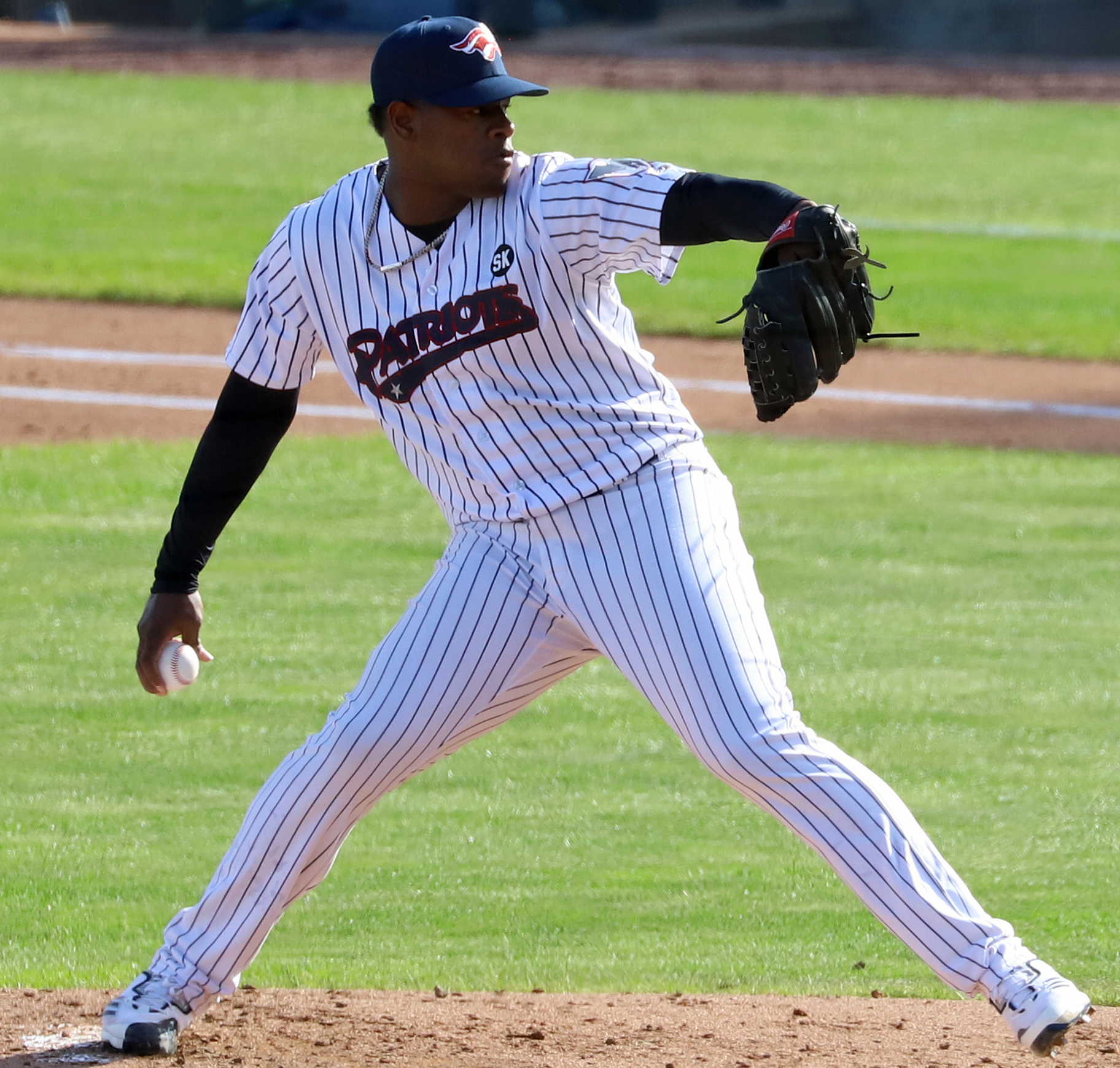
Luis Severino pitching for Somerset in 2021

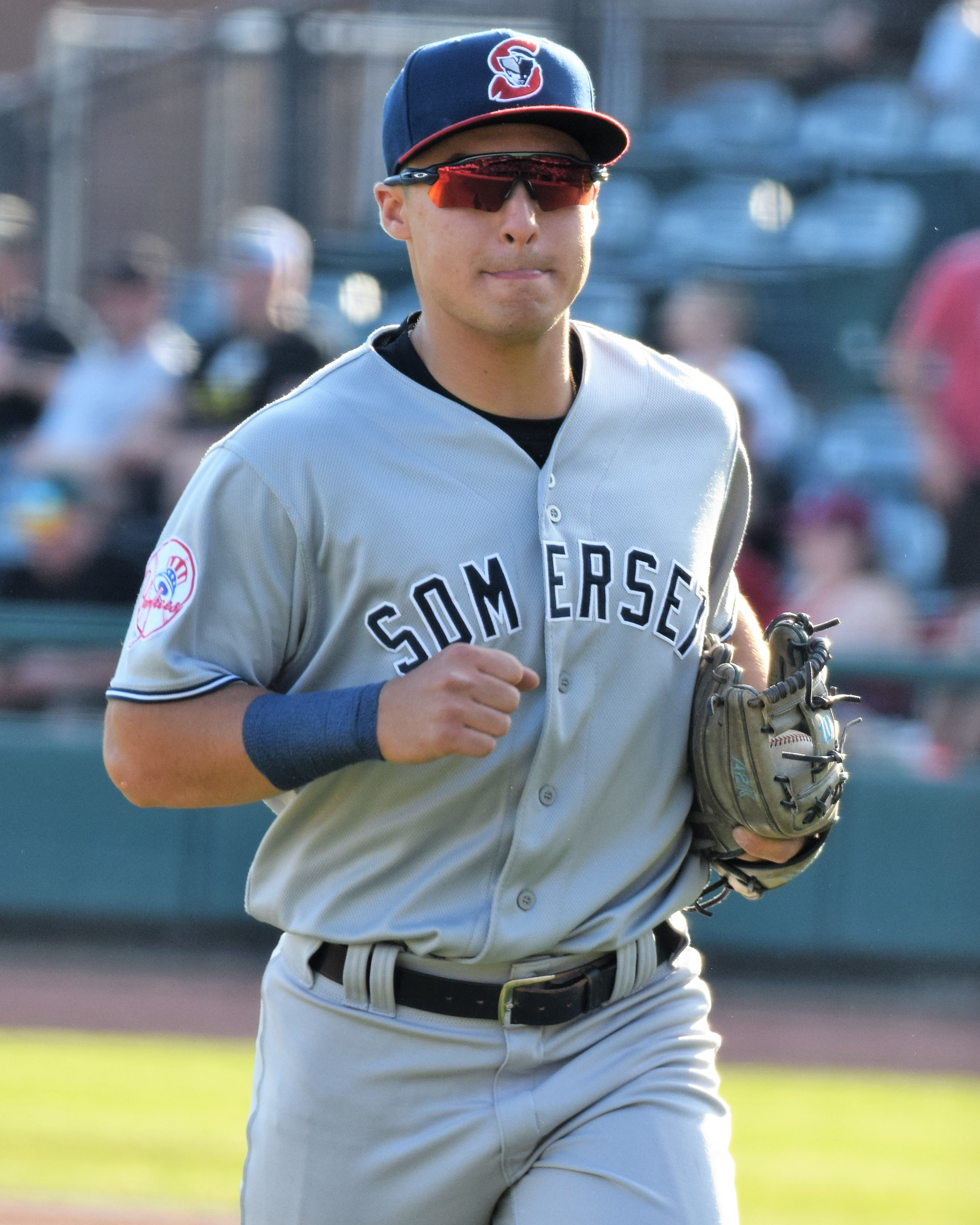
Anthony Volpe with the Somerset Patriots in 2022

Somerset Patriots
Season	W–L record	Win %	Finish	Playoffs
1998	40–59	.404	4th Overall	Did not qualify for playoffs
1999	60–60	.500	3rd Overall	0–3 (lost league championship)
2000	74–66	.528	1st in South Division	0–3 (lost league championship)
2001	83–43	.659	1st in South Division	3–2 (won league championship)
2002	65–60	.480	4th in South Division	Did not qualify for playoffs
2003	67–59	.532	2nd in South Division	3–2 (won league championship)
2004	68–58	.540	3rd in South Division	Did not qualify for playoffs
2005	78–62	.557	3rd in South Division	5–1 (won league championship)
2006	65–61	.515	3rd in South Division	Did not qualify for playoffs
2007	75–51	.595	1st in South Division	3–4 (lost league championship)
2008	74–66	.528	1st in Freedom Division	5–1 (won league championship)
2009	86–54	.614	1st in Freedom Division	6–2 (won league championship)
2010	75–65	.535	1st in Freedom Division	2–3 (lost in division final)
2011	49–74	.398	3rd in Freedom Division	Did not qualify for playoffs
2012	65–74	.468	3rd in Freedom Division	Did not qualify for playoffs
2013	90–49	.647	2nd in Freedom Division	6–4 (lost league championship)
2014	85–55	.607	1st in Liberty Division	2–3 (lost in division final)
2015	89–50	.640	1st in Liberty Division	6–3 (won league championship)
2016	77–63	.550	1st in Liberty Division	2–3 (lost in division final)
2017	74–65	.532	2nd in Liberty Division	3–4 (lost in division final)
2018	72–54	.571	1st in Liberty Division	2–3 (lost in division final)
2019	69–69	.500	4th in Liberty Division	Did not qualify for playoffs
2020	6–4	.600	1st in Somerset Professional Baseball Series	N/A
2021	72–47	.605	1st in Northeast Division	Did not qualify for playoffs
2022	83–53	.610	1st in Northeast Division	4–1 (won league championship)
2023	84–53	.613	1st in Northeast Division	0–2 (lost division final)
2024	75–62	.547	3rd in Northeast Division	2–2 (lost league championship)
2025	73–65	.529	2nd in Northeast Division	2–0 (lost division final)
2026	74–64	.536	1st in Northeast Division	Did not qualify for playoffs
Totals (1998–2026)	1,896–1,537	.552	—	51–42

== Logos and uniforms ==
The Somerset Patriots' official colors are navy blue, maroon, and silver. The primary logo depicts a Continental soldier in navy blue with white stars on his shoulder and maroon stripes flowing to his left, a reference to the U.S. flag. Centered below the soldier is the wordmark in navy blue underlined by a silver baseball bat outlined in navy blue. The word "Somerset" is centered above the wordmark in maroon.

The Patriots wear caps and uniforms produced by New Era. The caps are navy blue throughout with the cap logo centered on the front. The cap logo consists of the Continental soldier's head outlined in white and maroon. The Patriots also have an alternate cap that has a navy blue crown with a maroon brim and button. The cap logo on the alternate cap consists of a scripted "S" in maroon with a white outline and the Patriot-head cap logo superimposed. The home jersey includes pinstripes and the "Patriots" wordmark centered across the front in navy blue and maroon. The away jersey resembles the previous New York Yankees' away jersey with the "Somerset" wordmark. The belt, socks, and undershirt are navy blue.

The Patriots' current alternate jersey is navy blue, it has the "Patriots" wordmark centered on the chest in grey with a white outline. The Patriots' previous alternate jersey was also navy blue, it had the "Patriots" wordmark centered on the chest in maroon with a white outline and a white star in the underscore.

The Patriots have also played as the Jersey Diners for a couple of games during the 2024 season. In this alter-ego, the team wears a coffee mug emblem, and sports a cotton-candy blue uniform with hot pink accents.

== Radio and television ==
All of the Patriots' games are broadcast on Fox Sports New Jersey, as well as MiLB.TV with the voice of the Patriots, Steven Cusumano.

== Mascots ==
One of the Somerset Patriots' official mascots is an anthropomorphic dog named Sparkee. He wears the team's home uniform with white sneakers. The mascot debuted on July 11, 1998, at the Atlantic League's first All-Star Game at Bernie Robbins Stadium in Atlantic City. Sparkee's name refers to the Patriots' first manager, Sparky Lyle. The team also employs another character, a cat (according to Somerset Patriots staff (sometimes mistaken for a bear)) named Slider. After training with Sparkee for several months, he debuted in the 2007 season. Slider wears the Patriots' navy blue alternate jersey with gray pants. The team had a mascot named "TD" (after the stadium's sponsor) debuted in the June 30, 2010, game against the Camden Riversharks. Also, the team had a live mascot known as "General Admission" who wore the traditional uniform donned by those fighting for the colonies during the American Revolution complete with the three-cornered hat and musket.

== Roster ==
Somerset Patriots roster
Players	Coaches/Other
Pitchers: 31 Michael Arias; 19 Kelly Austin; 23 Harrison Cohen; 38 Bryce Cunningham; 22 Rory Fox; 20 Geoffrey Gilbert; 27 Dom Hamel; 44 Chase Hampton *; 7 Matt Keating; 21 Brady Kirtner; 8 Hueston Morrill; 30 Yerry Rodríguez; 32 Tony Rossi; 36 Clarke Schmidt * #; 29 Trent Sellers; 15 Cade Smith; 18 Kevin Stevens; 33 Chris Veach; Catchers: 50 Omar Alfonzo; 17 Manuel Palencia; 12 Miguel Palma; Infielders: 4 Roderick Arias; 11 Core Jackson; 6 Connor McGinnis; 3 Josh Moylan; 2 Kevin Verde ~; Outfielders: 1 Jace Avina; 9 Jackson Castillo; 8 Luis Durango; 5 Cole Gabrielson; 25 DJ Gladney; 13 Coby Morales	Manager: 24 James Cooper; Coaches: 50 Michael Fransoso (hitting); 14 Caleb Hamilton (defensive); 40 Demetre Kokoris (pitching); 8 Uziel Viloria (defense); 60-day injured list: 26 Ben Hess; 4 Duncan Pastore; 24 Brock Selvidge (full season); 7-day injured list; * On New York Yankees 40-man roster; ~ Development list; # Rehab assignment; ∞ Reserve list; ‡ Restricted list; § Suspended list; † Temporarily inactive list; Roster updated September 9, 2026; Transactions; → More rosters: MiLB • Eastern League; → New York Yankees minor league players

== Retired numbers ==
28 (Sparky Lyle)
Manager, Retired by the Patriots on June 14, 2014
42 (Jackie Robinson)
Second baseman, Retired throughout professional baseball on April 15, 1997

Achievements
Preceded by Lancaster Barnstormers; 2014	Atlantic League champions Somerset Patriots; 2015	Succeeded by Sugar Land Skeeters; 2016
Preceded by Newark Bears; 2007	Atlantic League champions Somerset Patriots; 2008, 2009	Succeeded by York Revolution; 2010
Preceded by Long Island Ducks; 2004	Atlantic League champions Somerset Patriots; 2005	Succeeded by Lancaster Barnstormers; 2006
Preceded by Newark Bears; 2002	Atlantic League champions Somerset Patriots; 2003	Succeeded by Long Island Ducks; 2004
Preceded by Nashua Pride; 2000	Atlantic League champions Somerset Patriots; 2001	Succeeded by Newark Bears; 2002
Preceded by Somerset Patriots; South Division; 2007	Freedom Division champions Somerset Patriots; 2008, 2009, 2010	Succeeded by York Revolution; 2011
Preceded by Lancaster Barnstormers; 2006	South Division champions Somerset Patriots; 2007	Succeeded by Somerset Patriots; Freedom Division; 2008
Preceded by Camden Riversharks; 2004	South Division champions Somerset Patriots; 2005	Succeeded by Lancaster Barnstormers; 2006
Preceded by Newark Bears; 2002	South Division champions Somerset Patriots; 2003	Succeeded by Camden Riversharks; 2004
Preceded by South Division Created	South Division champions Somerset Patriots; 2000, 2001	Succeeded by Newark Bears; 2002
