= Dominican Summer League Yankees =

Dominican Summer Yankees

Minor league affiliations
- Class: Rookie
- League: Dominican Summer League
- Division: Boca Chica South

Major league affiliations
- Team: New York Yankees

Minor league titles
- League titles (2): 2005; 2006

Team data
- Name: Yankees
- Ballpark: New York Yankees Complex
- Owner(s)/ Operator(s): New York Yankees
- Manager: Vacant

The Dominican Summer Yankees are a minor league baseball team in the Dominican Summer League. The team plays in the Boca Chica South division and is affiliated with the New York Yankees.

== Roster ==
Dominican Summer League NYY Bombers roster
Players		Coaches/Other
Pitchers: 99 Jerson Alejandro; -- Rafael Arias; -- Andre Avila; 98 Saul Brinez; -- Jhosneyker Colina; -- Manuel Cruz; 60 Franyer Herrera; 91 Luis Ilarraza; 50 Joshawn Lampson; 81 Jose Ledesma; -- Christopher Medina; 5 Anthony Mena; -- Hector Moreno; -- Jose Julian Rodgriguez; 69 Jose Rosario; 93 Mariano Salomon; 13 Enixon Sanchez; 58 Junior Tavera; 9 Mauricio Vargas; -- Varis Villarreal	Catchers: -- Justin Capellan; 12 Queni Pineda; 47 Carlos Villarroel; Infielders: -- Alfred Ciriaco; -- Leni Done; 56 Luis Escudero; 65 Christofer Reyes; -- Juan Torres; 67 Kevin Verde; Outfielders: -- Eliezer Adames; 26 David Carrera; 31 Browm Martinez; 22 Richard Meran; 17 Remy Veldhuisen; 28 Angel Ventura; 24 Francisco Vilorio	Manager: -- Carlos Vidal; Coaches: -- Edwin Beard (hitting); -- Eduardo Navas (defensive); -- Edwar Ramírez (pitching); 7-day injured list * On New York Yankees 40-man roster ~ Development list # Rehab assignment ∞ Reserve list ‡ Restricted list § Suspended list † Temporarily inactive list Roster updated March 14, 2025; Transactions → More rosters: MiLB • Dominican Summer League → New York Yankees minor league players

Dominican Summer League NYY Yankees roster
Players		Coaches/Other
Pitchers: -- Ranciel Abreu; 64 Stanly Alcantara; 72 Alexander Almonte; -- Wilfrido Bido; 42 Luis Burgos; -- Kevin Centeno; 76 Michell Chirinos; -- Chaury Gomez; -- Carlos Hampshire; 32 Jorge Luna; 71 Marco Manzano; 63 Edinzo Marquez; 52 Alexis Paulino; -- Luis Rodriguez; 73 Miguelangel Rodriguez; 51 Josue Silvestre; 43 Ronald Tejada; 8 Emanuel Vargas; 3 Oscar Vasquez; 39 Christopher Vasquez	Catchers: 38 Diego Flores; 97 Edgar Jimenez; 18 Luis Puello; -- Stalen Ramirez; -- Carlos Rondon; Infielders: -- Mani Cedeno; -- Stiven Martinez; 35 Richard Matic; 41 Dexters Peralta; Outfielders: 11 Isael Arias; -- Isaias Castillo; -- Jose Castro; -- Eddinson Charles; 25 Gabriel Lara; 77 Estivenzon Montero	Manager: -- Parker Guinn; Coaches: -- Selwyn Langaigne (hitting); -- Teuris Olivares (defensive); -- Freicer Perez (pitching); 7-day injured list * On New York Yankees 40-man roster ~ Development list # Rehab assignment ∞ Reserve list ‡ Restricted list § Suspended list † Temporarily inactive list Roster updated February 28, 2025; Transactions → More rosters: MiLB • Dominican Summer League → New York Yankees minor league players
