= Hunter Dietz =

American baseball player (born 2005)

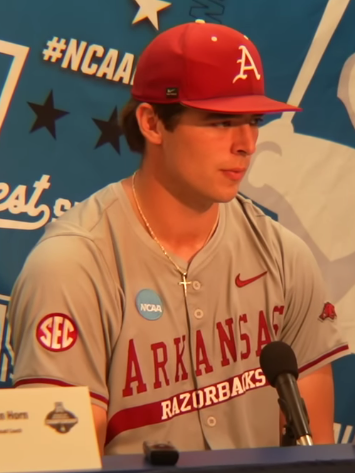
- Dietz with Arkansas in 2026

New York Yankees
- Pitcher
- Born: March 3, 2005 (age 21); Carmel, Indiana, U.S.
- Bats: Right Throws: Left
- Stats at Baseball Reference

Hunter Doyle Dietz (born March 3, 2005) is an American professional baseball pitcher in the New York Yankees organization. He played college baseball for the Arkansas Razorbacks.

== Career ==
Dietz attended Calvary Christian High School in Clearwater, Florida. As a senior, he went 9–0 with a 1.47 earned run average (ERA) and 102 strikeouts. He committed to the University of Arkansas to play college baseball.

Dietz pitched in only four games with 1 2/3 innings during his first two seasons at Arkansas in 2024 and 2025 due to injuries. In 2025, he played collegiate summer baseball with the Hyannis Harbor Hawks of the Cape Cod Baseball League. Dietz entered his redshirt sophomore year in 2026 as part of Arkansas' rotation.

Dietz was a top prospect for the 2026 MLB draft and was selected by the New York Yankees with the 35th overall pick. On July 14, he signed with the Yankees for a below-slot $2.49 million signing bonus.
