= List of defunct Florida sports teams =

This is a list of former sports teams from the US state of Florida:

== Baseball ==
=== Major Leagues ===
==== Negro leagues ====
- Jacksonville Red Caps

=== Minor League Baseball ===
==== Florida State League ====
- Bradenton Growers (1919–1920, 1923–1924, 1926)
- Cocoa Indians (1951–1958)
- Cocoa Astros (1965–1972)
- Daytona Beach Admirals (1987)
- Daytona Beach Astros (1978–1984)
- Daytona Beach Dodgers (1968–1973)
- Daytona Beach Islanders (1920–1924, 1936–1941, 1946–1966, 1977, 1985–1986)
- Deerfield Beach Sun Sox (1966)
- DeLand Reds (1936–1938)
- DeLand Red Hats (1939–1941, 1946–1954)
- DeLand Sun Caps (1970)
- Fort Lauderdale Yankees (1962–1992)
- Fort Lauderdale Red Sox (1993)
- Fort Myers Royals (1978–1988)
- Gainesville G-Men (1936–1941, 1946–1952, 1955–1958)
- Jacksonville Beach Sea Birds (1951–1954)
- Key West Padres (1969)
- Key West Sun Caps (1971)
- Key West Conchs (1972–1974)
- Key West Cubs (1975)
- Kissimmee Cobras (1995–2000)
- Lakeland Pilots (1953–1955)
- Lakeland Indians (1960)
- Lakeland Giants (1962)
- Lakeland Tigers (1963–1964, 1967–2006)
- Leesburg Gondoliers (1937–1938)
- Leesburg Anglers (1939–1941, 1946)
- Leesburg Pirates (1947–1948)
- Leesburg Dodgers (1949)
- Leesburg Packers (1950–1952)
- Leesburg Lakers (1953)
- Leesburg Braves (1956–1957)
- Leesburg Orioles (1960–1961)
- Leesburg Athletics (1965–1968)
- Miami Marlins (1962–70)
- Miami Marlins (1982–88)
- Miami Orioles (1971–1981)
- Miami Miracle (1989–1991)
- Ocala Yearlings (1940–1941)
- Orlando Gulls (1937)
- Orlando Senators (1938–1941, 1946–1953)
- Orlando C.B.'s (1954–1955)
- Orlando Seratomas (1956)
- Orlando Flyers (1957–1958)
- Orlando Dodgers (1959–1961)
- Orlando Twins (1963–1972)
- Osceola Astros (1985–1994)
- Palatka Azaleas (1936–1939, 1946–1953)
- Palatka Tigers (1956)
- Palatka Redlegs (1957–1961)
- Palatka Cubs (1962)
- Pompano Beach Mets (1969–1973)
- Pompano Beach Cubs (1976–1978)
- Port Charlotte Rangers (1987–2002)
- Sanford Lookouts (1936–1939)
- Sanford Seminoles (1940–1941, 1947)
- Sanford Celeryfeds (1946)
- Sanford Giants (1949–1951)
- Sanford Seminole Blues (1952)
- Sanford Cardinals (1953, 1955)
- Sanford Greyhounds (1959–1960)
- Sarasota Sun Sox (1961–1965)
- Sarasota White Sox (1989–1993)
- Sarasota Red Sox (1994–2004)
- St. Augustine Saints (1936–1941, 1946–1950, 1952)
- St. Petersburg Saints (1955–1965)
- St. Petersburg Cardinals (1966–1996)
- Tampa Tarpons (1931–1942) (1946–1987)
- Tampa White Sox (1988)
- Vero Beach Dodgers (1980–2006)
- West Palm Beach Sheriffs (1928)
- West Palm Beach Indians (1955)
- West Palm Beach Sun Chiefs (1956)
- West Palm Beach Braves (1965–1968)
- West Palm Beach Expos (1969–1997)
- Winter Haven Sun Sox (1966)
- Winter Haven Mets (1967)
- Winter Haven Red Sox (1969–1992)

==== Florida East Coast League (1940–1942) ====
- Cocoa Fliers (1941–1942)
- DeLand Red Hats (1942)
- Fort Lauderdale Tarpons (1940–1942)
- Fort Pierce Bombers (1940–1942)
- Hollywood Chiefs (1940)
- Miami Beach Flamingos (1941–1942)
- Miami Beach Tigers (1940)
- Miami Seminoles (1942)
- Miami Wahoos (1940–1941)
- Orlando Nationals (1942)
- West Palm Beach Indians (1940–1942)

==== Florida International League (1949–1954) ====
- Fort Lauderdale Braves (1949–1951)
- Fort Lauderdale Braves/Key West Conchs (1952)
- Fort Lauderdale Lions (1953)
- Lakeland Pilots (1949–1952)
- Miami Beach Flamingos (1949–1952, 1954)
- Miami Sun Sox (1949–1954)
- St. Petersburg Saints (1949–1954)
- Tallahassee Rebels (1954)
- Tampa Smokers (1949–1954)
- West Palm Beach Indians (1949–1954)

==== Senior Professional Baseball Association (1989–1990) ====
- Bradenton Explorers, became Daytona Beach Explorers
- Fort Myers Sun Sox
- Gold Coast Suns
- Orlando Juice
- St. Lucie Legends
- St. Petersburg Pelicans
- West Palm Beach Tropics
- Winter Haven Super Sox

== Basketball ==
=== Men's ===
==== American Basketball Association (1967–1976) ====
- Miami Floridians (1968–1972)

==== American Basketball Association (1999-Present) ====
- Palm Beach Imperials (2006–2008)

==== Continental Basketball Association ====
- Tampa Bay Thrillers (1984–1985) (1996–1997)
- Sarasota Stingers (1983–1985)
- Florida Stingers (1986–1987)

==== Global Basketball Association ====
- Pensacola HotShots (1991–1993)

==== United States Basketball League ====
- Brevard Blue Ducks (1988, 1990–04, as Jacksonville Hooters in 1988, 1990–92; as Daytona Beach Hooters in 1993; as Jacksonville Hooters in 1994; as Jacksonville Shooters in 1995; as Jacksonville Barracudas in 1996–98; as Gulf Coast SunDogs in 1999–00; as Lakeland Blue Ducks in 2001
- Florida Sea Dragons (2000–2002)
- Tampa Bay Windjammers (1996–1999)
- Florida Sharks (1995–97)
- Gold Coast Stingrays (1986)
- West Palm Beach Stingrays (1987)
- Palm Beach Stingrays (1988, 1990, 1992–1994)

==== World Basketball League ====
- Florida Jades (1991–1992)
- Jacksonville Stingrays (1992)

=== Women's ===
==== Women's National Basketball Association (WNBA) ====
- Miami Sol (2000–2002)
- Orlando Miracle (1999–2002) — relocated to the Mohegan Sun casino and now playing as the Connecticut Sun

== Football ==
=== Arena Football ===
==== American Indoor Football Association ====
- Gulf Coast Raiders (2007)
- Lakeland Thunderbolts (2005–2007)
- Lakeland Thunderbolts (2006–2007)

==== Arena Football League (AFL) ====
- Florida Bobcats (1996–2001)
- Miami Vise (1987)
- Miami Hooters (1993–1995)
- Orlando Predators (1991-2016)

==== arenafootball2 (af2) ====
- Florida Firecats (2001-2009)
- Jacksonville Tomcats (2000–2002)
- Pensacola Barracudas (2000–2002)
- Tallahassee Thunder (2000–2002)

==== American Professional Football League ====
- Florida Scorpions (2008-2009, 2011)

==== National Indoor Football League ====
- Daytona Beach Hawgs (2005)
- Florida Frenzy (2005–2007)
- Fort Myers Tarpons (2006–2007)
- Kissimmee Kreatures (2005–2006)
- Miami Vice Squad (2007)
- Palm Beach Phantoms (2006)
- Palm Beach Waves (2006–2007)
- Port St. Lucie Mustangs (2007)
- Tampa Tide (2007)

==== Southern Indoor Football League ====
- Florida Kings (2009)

==== Ultimate Indoor Football League ====
- Lakeland Raiders (2011-2015)
- Miami Inferno (2013-2014)
- Sarasota Thunder (2013)

==== X-League Indoor Football ====
- Florida Marine Raiders (2011-2015)

==== World Indoor Football League ====
- Daytona Beach Thunder (2005-2008)
- Osceola Ghostriders (2007)

=== Conventional Football ===
==== All-America Football Conference (AAFC) ====
- Miami Seahawks (1946)

==== Atlantic Coast Football League ====
- Orlando Panthers (1970–71)

==== Continental Football League ====
- Orlando Panthers (1965–1969)

==== Fall Experimental Football League ====
- Florida Blacktips (2014-2016)

==== Professional Spring Football League ====
- Tampa Bay Outlaws (1992)

==== Spring Football League ====
- Miami Tropics (2000)

==== United Football League ====
- Florida Tuskers (2009–2010)

==== United States Football League (USFL) ====
- Jacksonville Bulls (1984–1985)
- Orlando Renegades (1985)
- Tampa Bay Bandits (1983–1985)

==== Women's American Football League ====
- Jacksonville Dixie Blues (2001–2003)
- Orlando Mayhem IWFL (2001–2003)
- Orlando Fire (2001–2003)
- Tampa Bay Force (2001–2003)

==== XFL ====
- Orlando Rage (2000)

==== World Football League ====
- Jacksonville Express (1975)
- Jacksonville Sharks (1974)
- Florida Blazers (1974), became San Antonio Wings, folded with the league in 1975

==== World League of American Football ====
- Orlando Thunder (1991–1992)

== Ice hockey ==
=== American Hockey League (AHL) ===
- Jacksonville Barons (1973–1974)

=== Atlantic Coast Hockey League ===
- Orlando Seals (2002–2004)

=== East Coast Hockey League/ECHL ===
- Jacksonville Lizard Kings (1995–2000)
- Miami Matadors (1998–1999)
- Pensacola Ice Pilots (1996–2008)
- Tallahassee Tiger Sharks (1994–2001)

=== International Hockey League (1945–2001) ===
- Orlando Solar Bears (1995–2001)

=== Roller Hockey International ===
- Florida Hammerheads (1993–1994)
- Orlando Rollergators (1995)
- Orlando Jackals (1996–1997)
- Tampa Bay Tritons (1994)

=== Southern Elite Hockey League ===
- Daytona Riptide
- Jacksonville Hammerheads
- Kissimmee Fury
- Space Coast Blast
- Tampa Bay Ice Pirates

=== Southern Hockey League (1995–1996) ===
- Lakeland Prowlers
- Daytona Beach Breakers
- West Palm Beach Barracudas
- Jacksonville Bullets

=== Southern Professional Hockey League ===
- Florida Seals (2005–2007)
- Jacksonville Barracudas (2002–2008)

=== Sunshine Hockey League (1992–1995) ===
- Daytona Beach Sun Devils
- Jacksonville Bullets
- Lakeland Ice Warriors
- St. Petersburg Renegades
- West Palm Beach Blaze

=== Tropical Hockey League ===
- Coral Gables Seminoles
- Miami Clippers
- Miami Beach Pirates

=== World Hockey Association 2 ===
- Jacksonville Barracudas (2002–2008)
- Lakeland Loggerheads (2002–2004)
- Orlando Seals (2002–2004)
- Miami Manatees (2003–2004)

== Soccer ==
=== Indoor ===
==== Eastern Indoor Soccer League ====
- Pensacola Flyers (1998)
- Tallahassee Scorpions (1997–1998)

==== Major Indoor Soccer League ====
- Orlando Sharks (2007–2008)

==== National Professional Soccer League (1984–2001) ====
- Florida ThunderCats (1998–1999)
- Jacksonville Generals (1988)
- Tampa Bay Rowdies (1986–1987)
- Tampa Bay Terror (1995–1997)

==== United States Interregional Soccer League indoor ====
- Brandon Braves (1994–1996)
- Cocoa Expos (1993–1996)
- Orlando Lions (1993–1996)

=== Outdoor ===
==== American Professional Soccer League ====
- Fort Lauderdale Strikers (1990–1994)
- Miami Freedom (1990–1992)
- Orlando Lions (1990)
- Tampa Bay Rowdies (1990–1993)

==== American Soccer League (1933–83) ====
- Jacksonville Tea Men (1983)

==== American Soccer League (1988–89) ====
- Fort Lauderdale Strikers (1988–1989)
- Miami Sharks (1988–1989)
- Orlando Lions (1988–1989)
- Tampa Bay Rowdies (1988–1989)

==== Major League Soccer ====
- Miami Fusion F.C. (1998–2001)
- Tampa Bay Mutiny (1996–2001)

==== North American Soccer League (1968–84) ====
- Jacksonville Tea Men (1980–1982)
- Miami Gatos (1972)
- Miami Toros (1973–1976)
- Fort Lauderdale Strikers (1977–1983)
- Tampa Bay Rowdies (1975–1984)

==== North American Soccer League ====
- Fort Lauderdale Strikers (2011–2016)

==== United States International Soccer League ====
- Boca Raton Sabres (1992–1994)
- Cocoa Expos (1994)
- Coral Springs Kicks (1993)
- Florida Stars (1994)
- Fort Lauderdale Kicks (1994)
- Jacksonville Fury (1994–1995)
- Orlando Lions (1992–1994)
- South Florida Flamingos (1994)

==== United Soccer League (1984–85) ====
- Fort Lauderdale Sun (1984–1985)
- Jacksonville Tea Men (1984)

==== United Soccer Leagues ====
- Orlando Lions (1992–1994)
- Miami FC (2006–2009)

==== United Soccer Leagues First Division ====
- Jacksonville Cyclones (1997–1999)
- Orlando Sundogs (1997)
- Tampa Bay Cyclones (1996)

==== United Soccer Leagues Second Division ====
- Daytona Tigers (1997)
- Florida Stars (1995)
- Florida Strikers (1995, 1997)
- Fort Lauderdale Strikers (1995)
- Miami Breakers (1998)
- Orlando Nighthawks (1997–98)
- Pensacola Barracudas (1998)
- Tallahassee Tempest (1998)
- Tampa Bay Cyclones (1995)

==== USSF Division 2 Professional League ====
- Miami FC (2010)

== See also ==
- List of defunct Georgia sports teams
- List of defunct Idaho sports teams
- List of defunct Mississippi sports teams
- List of defunct Ohio sports teams
- List of defunct Pennsylvania sports teams
- List of defunct Texas sports teams
