= Cocoa Indians =

- 1951–1958; Cocoa, Florida

Minor league affiliations
- Class: Class D (1951–1958)
- League: Florida State League (1951–1958)

Major league affiliations
- Team: New York Giants (1956); Cleveland Indians (1957–1958)

Minor league titles
- League titles (1): 1956
- Conference titles (1): 1956

Team data
- Name: Cocoa Indians (1951–1958)
- Ballpark: Provost Park (1951–1958)

The Cocoa Indians were a minor league baseball team based in Cocoa, Florida. From 1951 to 1958 the "Indians" played exclusively as members of the Dlass D level Florida State League, winning the 1956 league championship. The Cocoa Indians were a minor league affiliate of the New York Giants in 1956 and the Cleveland Indians in 1957 and 1958.

The Cocoa Indians teams hosted home minor league games at Provost Park in Cocoa. The park is still in use today.

== History ==
=== Early Cocoa teams ===
Cocoa first hosted minor league baseball in the 1942 season when the Cocoa Fliers began play as charter members of the Class D level Florida East Coast League, finishing in last place. After completing their first season, Cocoa returned to the league for the 1942 season. After briefly beginning play, the Cocoa team folded after four games on April 21, 1942, and the 1942 Florida East Coast League season was cancelled due to the beginning of World War II on May 14, 1942.

=== 1951 to 1955: unaffiliated teams ===
The Cocoa Indians resumed minor league play in Cocoa in 1951. The franchise was formed as an unaffiliated team and the Cocoa "Indians" became members of the eight–team Class D level Florida State League. Cocoa replaced the St. Augustine Saints team in the league.

The Daytona Beach Islanders (Cleveland Indians affiliate), DeLand Red Hats, Gainesville G-Men, Leesburg Packers, Orlando Senators (Washington Senators affiliate), Palatka Azaleas and Sanford Giants (New York Giants affiliate) teams joined the Cocoa Indians in beginning Florida State League play on April 13, 1951.

The Cocoa use of the "Indians" nickname occurred when Cocoa was a team without a minor league affiliation. The "Indians" nickname corresponds with regional history and geography. Numerous Indian tribes were native to the state of Florida and the Cocoa region. Native Indians had first inhabited the Brevard County region, which contains Cocoa and existed in the area for approximately 1,200 years. When founded, Cocoa was first called "Indian River City" in 1882, but the name was rejected by the U. S. Postal Service because it was too long. The Indian River (Florida) and Indian River Lagoon are both in Cocoa and the region.

In their first season of play, the newly formed Cocoa Indians ended the 1951 season in last place in the Florida State League final standings. Cocoa ended their first season with a final record of 49–91. The Indians finished in eighth place, playing the season managers Carl Kettles (12–33), Lee Hipp (5–10), Sam Demma (25–38) and Harry Murdock (7–10). Cocoa ended the Florida State League regular season 41.0 games behind the first place DeLand Red Hats. with their eighth-place finish, the Indians did not qualify for the four-team playoffs won by DeLand.

In 1952, the Florida State League expanded to a 10-team league to begin the season, adding the Jacksonville Beach Sea Birds and St. Augustine Saints as expansion teams. However, the Gainsville G-Men and St. Augustine Saints teams both folded on June 2, 1952, and the league completed the season with eight teams. Cocoa again finished in last place in the final league standings. The Indians ended the season with a final record of 40–93 to finish the season in eighth place and Cocoa was led by managers James Balogh and Pep Rambert. The Indians ended the regular season 54.0 games behind the first place DeLand Red Hats. Cocoa did not qualify for the four-team playoffs won by the Palatka Azaleas.

In 1953, The Florida State League played the season as an eight-team league and Cocoa improved in the Class D level league standings. Cocoa ended the season in third place, with an overall record of 75–59, playing the season under manager Bama Rowell Cocoa finished 9.0 games behind the first place Daytona Beach Islanders in the overall regular season standings. The league adopted a split season schedule, with Daytona Beach winning the first half title and the DeLand Red Hats winning the second half title. DeLand ended the regular season in second place in the overall standings, 2.0 games ahead of Cocoa. The two teams then had a playoff, where Daytona Beach defeated DeLand to capture the championship. Cocoa Indians player manager Carvell "Bama" Rowell scored 127 runs to lead the Florida State League. Playing at age 37, Rowell hit .345 for Cocoa with 12 home runs and 127 RBI with 42 stolen bases.

Cocoa player/manager "Bama" Rowell was in his first season as a minor league manager in 1953. Before returning to the minor leagues, Rowell had played six seasons in the major leagues with the Boston Braves (1939–1941, 1946–1947) and Philadelphia Phillies (1948) as a second baseman and outfielder. Coming from a family with 10 children, Rowell had played both football and baseball while attending Louisiana State University. His major league baseball career was interrupted by World War II. Rowell was drafted into the U.S. Army in 1941 and served in a chemical warfare training battalion, eventually achieving the rank of sergeant. He returned to baseball following his military service. Playing for the Boston Braves on May 30, 1946, Rowell hit a notable ball at Ebbets Field in a game against the Brooklyn Dodgers that struck the Bulova clock that was atop the scoreboard. The ball bounded back onto the field and broken glass rained down on the Dodgers' outfielder Dixie Walker. The hit inspired a scene in the 1984 movie The Natural. In 1987, Bulova presented Rowell with a wristwatch in honor of the event. Bulova had promoted a free watch to any player who hit the clock and Rowell received his watch 41 years later, on "Bama Rowell Day," held in his hometown of Citronelle, Alabama.

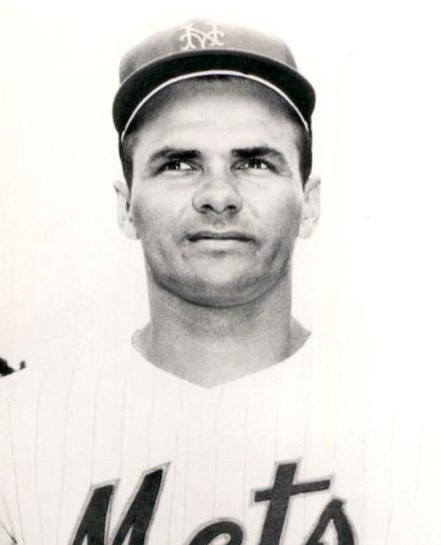
(1962) Ray Daviault, New York Mets. Daviault pitched for Cocoa in 1953 and was a member of the expansion 1962 New York Mets.

Ray Daviault pitched for Cocoa in 1953 in his first professional season, compiling a 10–8 record with a 3.25 ERA in 19 games. A native of Montreal, Quebec, Canada, Daviault was signed by Al Campanis of the Los Angeles Dodgers and assigned to Cocoa by the Dodgers. Daviault struck out 15 hitters in one start for Cocoa. With a brief major league career, Daviault made his major league debut pitching for the expansion 1962 New York Mets and appearing in the Mets' first home game at the Polo Grounds. On June 30, 1962, Daviault had a career-high seven strikeouts against the Los Angeles Dodgers in a game in which Dodgers Hall of Fame pitcher Sandy Koufax threw first career no-hitter. When the Montreal Expos were formed, Daviault often threw batting practice at Jarry Park. On April 15, 1977, Daviault threw out a ceremonial first pitch before the Montreal Expos first game at the Olympic Stadium (Montreal). In 2017, Daviault was recognized along with Russell Martin and Eric Gagne as Canadian-born Major League players in ceremonies before a Toronto Blue Jays and Pittsburgh Pirates spring training game held at Olympic Stadium in Montreal. In August 2017, a baseball field was dedicated to Ray Daviault in Pointe-aux-Trembles. The ballpark is home to the Montreal Brewers of the Ligue de Baseball Majeur du Québec.

The Florida State League reduced to six-teams for the 1954 season, as the Leesburg and Palaka teams did not return. Cocoa compiled a record of 60–76 to end the Florida State League regular season in fifth place in the overall standings. The Indians were led by returning manager Bama Rowell (41–57), Clyde Stevens (1–3) and Bill Steinecke (18–16) during the season. In the overall regular season standings the Indians finished 17.0 games behind the first place Orlando C.B.'s. Orlando did not qualify for the playoff as the league continued with a split season format. The Jacksonville Beach Seabirds won the first half title and the Lakeland Pilots won the second half title. Lakeland then won the title, defeating Jacksonville Beach in the final series. After leaving Cocoa during the season, Bama Rowell stayed in the Florida State League and became the manager of the DeLand Red Hats, his final minor league managing position.

Bill Steinecke had a lengthy minor league career as a manager and as a player. As a player he appeared in 1,907 minor league games over 21 seasons, batting .297 with 57 home runs and 855 RBI in the minors. From 1946 to 1964 he served as a minor league manager. After managing Cocoa, Steineke joined the Milwaukee Braves' farm system in 1955 and continued with the Braves minor league teams through the 1964 season. While serving as manager of the Class D level McCook Braves in the Nebraska State League, he was featured in pitcher Pat Jordan's novel, A False Spring.

The 1955 Florida State League expanded to eight teams, adding the West Palm Beach Indians and St. Petersburg Saints teams. Bill Steineke left Cocoa and became the manager of the new West Palm beach team, who were a Milwaukee Braves affiliate. The Cocoa Indians continued league play as an unaffiliated team and ended the regular season in third place. Cocoa ended the season with a record of 75–64, playing the season under managers Gaspar del Monte (12–8) and Doug Williams (63–56). Cocoa finished 16.5 games behind the first place Orlando C.B.'s in the overall regular season standings. With the spilt season schedule remaining, no playoff was held, as Orlando finished in first place in both half-seasons of league play. Inocencio Rodriguez of Cocoa hit 20 home runs to lead the Florida State League. At age 21, Rodriguez hit .319 with 111 RBI, 24 stolen bases and a .454 OBP for Cocoa in 127 games. He played in the minor leagues through 1959.

=== 1956 to 1958: League champions and minor league affiliate teams ===
At age 33, Buddy Kerr was hired to manage Cocoa in 1956 in his first managerial position. After growing up in New York city less than a mile from The Polo Grounds, Kerr had been a shortstop for the New York Giants for seven seasons during his career and was a favorite of Giants' owner Horace Stoneham. Kerr managed in the minor leagues for New York and San Francisco Giants affiliated teams through 1963. He then became scout for the San Francisco Giants in 1964 and signed John Montefusco among others.

The Cocoa Indians became an affiliated team and won the 1956 Florida State League championship, as the league continued play as a Class D level league with eight teams. Cocoa became an affiliated team for the first time, playing the season as an affiliate of the New York Giants while retaining their "Indians" nickname. The Indians ended the regular season with an overall record of 90–50, finishing in first place under manager Buddy Kerr. Cocoa ended the season 7.0 games ahead of the second place Gainsville G-Men and 34.0 games ahead of the eighth place Orlando Seratomas in the final overall standings. No playoff was held, as the league continued with a split season schedule and Cocoa finished in first place in both half-seasons of league play, claiming the championship.

In 1956, Cocoa's Felipe Alou won the Florida State League batting title, hitting .380 on the season, while his teammate Gene Cockrell hit 22 home runs to tie for the league lead. Cocoa pitcher Julio Navarro won the league triple crown, leading the Florida State with 24 wins, a 2.16 ERA and 216 strikeouts.

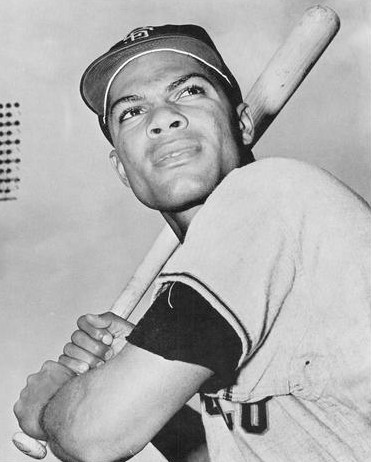
(1961) Felipe Alou, San Francisco Giants. Alou played for the 1956 Cocoa Indians in his first professional season and won the Florida State League batting championship, hitting .380.

A member of the Alou family, Felipe Alou was on the on Dominican Republic national track and field team. He attended the University of Santo Domingo in 1954 as a premedical student and played a season of baseball in college while practicing for the track events at the 1955 Pan American Games. On the eve of the Pan American Games, Alou was switched from the track roster to the 1955 Pan American Games baseball roster representing the Dominican. The Dominican team won the gold medal at the games. Alou had planned to resume his medical studies at the University of Santo Domingo, but he had attracted interest in baseball due to his university coach, who had served as a scout with the Giants. In November 1955, Alou signed a professional baseball contract with the New York Giants for $200 and played with the Cocoa Indians in his first professional season.

Alou was first assigned by the New York Giants to the Lake Charles Giants of the Evangeline League. After a short time with Lake Charles, Alou was eventually reassigned to Cocoa due to segregation in the Evangeline League and laws that were put in place to ban black players from select league ballparks. Alou played in a few games with Lake Charles before all five black players in the Evangeline League were transferred to other leagues on May 6, 1956. Lake Charles was at first forced by the league to forfeit the games in which Alou played, an action that was later rescinded. Alou then was assigned by the Giants to the Cocoa Indians, riding a Greyhound bus for three days to reach Cocoa from Lake Charles, Louisiana. Of his time in Cocoa, Alou said, "Because I could hit right away as a professional player, I felt mostly accepted by my teammates. And Cocoa turned out to be a paradise for me. The fishing, the weather, the vegetation, it reminded me of home." He said of his manager Buddy Kerr, "There were times when what kept me going was Buddy Kerr’s kindness. He would pull me aside and tell me I had what it took to make it, to not give up, to not let the racial slurs and slights defeat me. And those times when pitchers would throw at me, Kerr never hesitated to defend me, often doing so on the field, threatening opposing team and pitcher. What a man. I appreciate more today his courage and decency."

In 2010, Felipe Alou was inducted into the Florida State League Hall of Fame after managing in the league for seven seasons as well as playing in the league for Cocoa. Alou had a 17-season major league career as a player and was a successful manager for the Montreal Expos and San Francisco Giants.

In 1957, Buddy Kerr became manager of the New York Giants affiliate Selma Cloverleafs of the Alabama-Florida League and Cocoa hired a new manager as the team did not remain as a New York Giants affiliate. After retiring as a player, Hank Majeski began managing in the minor leagues and led the 1956 the Daytona Beach Islanders to a fourth-place finish in the behind Cocoa in the Florida State League in his first season as a manager. Daytona Beach was a Cleveland Indians minor league affiliate. In 1957 Majeski replaced Buddy Kerr and was named manager of the Cocoa Indians. Majeski next managed the 1973 Oneonta Yankees. Majeski also served as a scout for several major league teams. He later was the baseball coach for Wagner College and, was a batting coach for the Houston Astros.

Continuing play in the Florida State League, Cocoa became a minor league affiliate of the Cleveland Indians in 1957. The Indians defended their Florida State League title with a sixth-place finish in the Class D level eight-team league. The Indians ended the season with an overall record of 62–76 in the final overall standings. Cocoa finished in sixth place, playing under managers Hank Majeski (43–61) and Jim Gruzdis (19–15). In the overall league standings, Cocoa finished 22.0 games behind the first place Tampa Tarpons. Tampa won the second half title of the split season schedule and the Palatka Redlegs won the first half title. Cocoa did not qualify for the final in which Tampa defeated Palaka for the championship. Cocoa pitcher Julio Guerra won 26 games with 308 strikeouts to lead the Florida State League in both categories. In his first professional season at age 20, Guerra had a 26–9 record, throwing 292 innings with 21 complete games and 5 shutouts on the season. In subsequent seasons, Guerra never matched his success of 1957 and pitched his final minor league season in 1963.

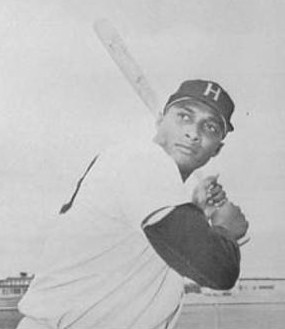
(1965) Walt Bond, Houston Colt 45's. Bond made his professional debut with Cocoa in 1957. Bond died in 1967 at age 29 from leukemia after having played with the Minnesota Twins that season.

Walt Bond made his professional debut with Cocoa in 1957 after attending Lane College. Playing for the Indians at age 19, Bond hit .328 with 11 home runs and 80 RBI with 17 stolen bases for Cocoa in 111 games. The 6'7" Bond later player played six Major League Baseball seasons between 1960 and 1967, playing for the Cleveland Indians, Houston Colt .45s/Astros and Minnesota Twins. Bond played the last five seasons baseball career after being diagnosed with leukemia while serving in the United States Army. On September 14, 1962, at age 29, Bond died of the leukemia after he made the Minnesta Twins opening day roster and began the season with the Twins. Bond was interred at Houston National Cemetery on September 18, 1967.

Chuck Hiller also played for Cocoa in 1957. Hiller was signed by Cleveland Indians scout Cy Slapnicka after a stellar career at the University of St. Thomas. As a major league scout, Slapnicka had signed Baseball Hall of Fame members Bob Feller and Lou Boudreau as well as Roger Maris. Slapnicka signed Hiller with a $300 per month monthly salary. Upon signing, Cleveland assigned Hiller to the Cocoa Indians. Hiller hit .293 with 11 home runs, 9 triples and 78 walks in 133 games for Cocoa.

In their final season, the 1958 Cocoa Indians continued play as a Cleveland Indians minor league affiliate. The Indians placed fifth overall in the Florida State League standings. The Florida State played the 1958 season with seven teams, after the Leesburg Braves franchise did not return to the league. In their final season as a Cleveland Indians minor league affiliate, Cocoa compiled a record of 64–78, playing the season under manager Paul O'Dea. Cocoa finished 36.5 games behind the first place St. Petersburg Saints in the final standings. No Florida State League playoffs were held in 1958.

The Cocoa franchise did not return to play in the 1959 Florida State League, as the league reduced to six teams with the Gainesville G-Men also folding from the league.

Cocoa next hosted minor league baseball in 1964, when the Cocoa Colts resumed play as members of the Cocoa Rookie League. The Cocoa Rookie League permanently folded after one season of play. Continuing minor league play the next season, Cocoa hosted the 1965 Cocoa Astros, who rejoined the Florida State League, which was a Class A level league.

== The ballpark ==
Beginning with their tenure in 1951, the Cocoa Indians teams hosted all home minor league games at Provost Park in Cocoa. The ballpark, which was within Provost Park was also referred to as "Indians Park." The ballpark had previously hosted the Cocoa Fliers minor league teams in 1940 and 1941. Today Provost Park is still in use as a public park, hosting softball, rugby and soccer. Provost Park received upgrades to its sports facilities in 2024. The park is located at 400 Varr Avenue in Cocoa, Florida.

== Timeline ==
Year(s)	# Yrs.	Team	Level	League	Affiliate	Ballpark
1951–1955	5	Cocoa Indians	Class D	Florida State League	None	Provost Park
1956	1	Cocoa Indians	Class D	Florida State League	New York Giants	Provost Park
1957–1958	2	Cocoa Indians	Class D	Florida State League	Cleveland Indians	Provost Park

== Year–by–year records ==
Year	Record	Finish	Manager	Playoffs/Notes
1951	49–91	8th	Carl Kettles (12–33) / Lee Hipp (5–10); Sam Demma (25–38) / Harry Murdock (7–10)	Did not qualify
1952	40–93	8th	Pep Rambert / James Balogh	Did not qualify
1953	75–89	3rd	Bama Rowell	Did not qualify
1954	60–76	5th	Bama Rowell (41–57) / Clyde Stevens (1–3); Bill Steinecke (18–16)	Did not qualify
1955	75–64	3rd	Gaspar del Monte (12–8) / Doug Williams (63–56)	No Playoffs held
1956	90–50	1st	Buddy Kerr	No Playoffs held Won both split-season titles League champions
1957	62–76	6th	Hank Majeski (43–61) / Jim Gruzdis (19–15)	Did not qualify
1958	64–78	5th	Paul O'Dea	No Playoffs held

== Notable alumni ==
- Felipe Alou (1956) 3x MLB All–Star; 1994 NL Manager of the Year; San Francisco Giants Wall of Fame
- Walt Bond (1957)
- Larry Brown (1958)
- Ray Daviault (1953)
- Chuck Hiller (1957)
- Buddy Kerr (1956, MGR) MLB All-Star
- Jim Lawrence (1958)
- Ramon Lopez (1958)
- Hank Majeski (1957, MGR)
- Julio Navarro (1955–1956)
- Paul O'Dea (1958, MGR)
- Tony Pacheco (1953)
- Pep Rambert (1952, MGR)
- Bama Rowell (1953–1954, MGR)
- Bill Steinecke (1954, MGR)
- Jim Weaver (1958)

== See also ==
- Cocoa Indians players
