= List of Florida State League champions =

The Florida State League of Minor League Baseball is a Single-A baseball league in the United States. The league was founded in 1919. A league champion is determined at the end of each season. Champions have been determined by postseason playoffs, winning the regular season pennant, or being declared champion by the league office. Off and on (1919–28, 1936–41, and 1946–68), the league recognized pennant winners and/or playoff winners as league champions. In 2019, the first-half and second-half winners in each division (North and South) competed in a best-of-three series to determine division champions. Then, the North and South division winners played a best-of-five series to determine a league champion. Since 1979, the winner of the League Championship Series has become the holder—until the following season's championship—of the Watson Spoelstra Florida State League Championship Trophy. As of 2022, the winners of each division from both the first and second halves of the season meet in a best-of-three division series, with the winners of the two division series meeting in a best-of-three championship series.

== Key ==
^	Indicates pennant winner (1919–28, 1936–41, 1946–68)
†	Indicates playoff winner (1919–28, 1936–41, 1946–68)
‡	Indicates pennant and playoff winner (1919–28, 1936–41, 1946–68)

== League champions ==
Score and finalist information is only presented when postseason play occurred. The lack of this information indicates a declared league champion.

Year	Champion	Score	Finalist
1919	Sanford Celeryfeds^{^}	5—3	Orlando Caps
1920	Tampa Smokers^{‡}	—	-
1921	Orlando Tigers^{^}	—	—
1922	St. Petersburg Saints^{‡}	—	—
1923	Orlando Bulldogs^{‡}	—	—
1924	Lakeland Highlanders^{^}	—	—
1925	Tampa Smokers^{‡}	4—3	Lakeland Highlanders
1926	Sanford Celeryfeds^{‡}	—	—
1927	Orlando Colts^{‡}	4—1	Miami Hustlers
1928^{[a]}	Fort Lauderdale Tarpons; St. Petersburg Saints^{^}	—	—
1936	Gainesville G-Men^{^}	—	1936 Pennant
1936	St. Augustine Saints^{‡}	4—0	Daytona Beach Islanders
1937	Gainesville G-Men^{‡}	4—2	Sanford Lookouts
1938	Leesburg Gondoliers^{^}	—	1938 Pennant
1938	Gainesville G-Men^{^}	4—2	Leesburg Gondoliers
1939	Sanford Lookouts^{‡}	4—3	Daytona Beach Islanders
1940	Daytona Beach Islanders^{^}	—	1940 Pennant
1940	Orlando Senators^{†}	4—0	Sanford Seminoles
1941	Sanford Seminoles^{^}	—	1941 Pennant
1941	Leesburg Anglers^{†}	4—1	DeLand Red Hats
1946	Orlando Senators^{‡}	4—3	Sanford Celeryfeds
1947	St. Augustine Saints^{^}	—	1947 Pennant
1947	Gainesville G-Men^{†}	4—3	Gainesville G-Men
1948	Orlando Senators^{^}	—	1948 Pennant
1948	Daytona Beach Islanders^{†}	4—2	Sanford Giants
1949	Gainesville G-Men^{^}	—	1949 Pennant
1949	St. Augustine Saints^{†}	4—1	Orlando Senators
1950	Orlando Senators^{^}	—	1950 Pennant
1950	DeLand Red Hats^{†}	4—1	Gainesville G-Men
1951	DeLand Red Hats^{‡}	4—1	Orlando Senators
1952	DeLand Red Hats^{^}	—	1952 Pennant
1952	Palatka Azaleas^{†}	3—1	Daytona Beach Islanders
1953	Daytona Beach Islanders^{^}	3—1	DeLand Red Hats
1954	Lakeland Pilots^{‡}	3—2	Jacksonville Beach Sea Birds
1955	Orlando C.B.s^{^}	—	
1956	Cocoa Indians^{^}	—	—
1957	Tampa Tarpons^{^}	3—1	Palatka Redlegs
1958	St. Petersburg Saints^{^}	—	—
1959	St. Petersburg Saints^{^}	4—2	Tampa Tarpons
1960	Palatka Redlegs^{^}	3—1	Lakeland Indians
1961	Tampa Tarpons^{^}	3—1	Sarasota Sun Sox
1962	Fort Lauderdale Yankees^{^}	3—0	Sarasota Sun Sox
1963	Sarasota Sun Sox^{^}	—	—
1964	Fort Lauderdale Yankees^{^}	—	St. Petersburg Saints
1965	Fort Lauderdale Yankees^{^}	—	—
1966	Leesburg Athletics^{^}	3—2	St. Petersburg Cardinals
1967	St. Petersburg Cardinals^{^}	3—1	Orlando Twins
1968^{[b]}	Miami Marlins^{^}	—	—
1969	Miami Marlins	4–1	Orlando Twins
1970	Miami Marlins	2–0	St. Petersburg Cardinals
1971	Miami Orioles	2–1	Cocoa Astros
1972	Miami Orioles	2–1	Daytona Beach Dodgers
1973	St. Petersburg Cardinals	2–0	West Palm Beach Expos
1974	West Palm Beach Expos	2–1	Fort Lauderdale Yankees
1975	St. Petersburg Cardinals	3–2	Tampa Tarpons
1976	Lakeland Tigers	2–0	Tampa Tarpons
1977	Lakeland Tigers	3–1	St. Petersburg Cardinals
1978	Miami Orioles	2–1	Lakeland Tigers
1979	Winter Haven Red Sox	3–2	Fort Lauderdale Yankees
1980	Fort Lauderdale Yankees	3–1	Vero Beach Dodgers
1981	Daytona Beach Astros	3–1	Fort Myers Royals
1982	Fort Lauderdale Yankees	—	—
1983	Vero Beach Dodgers	3–2	Daytona Beach Astros
1984	Fort Lauderdale Yankees	3–2	Tampa Tarpons
1985	Fort Myers Royals	3–1	Fort Lauderdale Yankees
1986	St. Petersburg Cardinals	3–1	West Palm Beach Expos
1987	Fort Lauderdale Yankees	3–1	Osceola Astros
1988	St. Lucie Mets	2–0	Osceola Astros
1989	Charlotte Rangers	2–1	St. Petersburg Cardinals
1990	Vero Beach Dodgers	2–1	West Palm Beach Expos
1991	West Palm Beach Expos	2–0	Clearwater Phillies
1992	Lakeland Tigers	2–0	Baseball City Royals
1993	Clearwater Phillies	3–1	St. Lucie Mets
1994	Tampa Yankees	3–1	Brevard County Manatees
1995	Daytona Cubs	3–2	Fort Myers Miracle
1996	St. Lucie Mets	3–1	Clearwater Phillies
1997	St. Petersburg Devil Rays	3–2	Vero Beach Dodgers
1998	St. Lucie Mets	3–2	Tampa Yankees
1999	Kissimmee Cobras	3–1	Dunedin Blue Jays
2000	Daytona Cubs	3–0	Dunedin Blue Jays
2001^{[c]}	Brevard County Manatees; Tampa Yankees	Championship series canceled due to September 11 attacks	
2002	Charlotte Rangers	3–2	Lakeland Tigers
2003	St. Lucie Mets	3–1	Dunedin Blue Jays
2004^{[d]}	Daytona Cubs; Tampa Yankees	Championship series canceled due to Hurricane Ivan	
2005	Palm Beach Cardinals	3–2	Lakeland Tigers
2006	St. Lucie Mets	3–0	Dunedin Blue Jays
2007	Clearwater Threshers	3–1	Brevard County Manatees
2008	Daytona Cubs	3–1	Fort Myers Miracle
2009	Tampa Yankees	3–2	Charlotte Stone Crabs
2010	Tampa Yankees	3–1	Charlotte Stone Crabs
2011	Daytona Cubs	3–0	St. Lucie Mets
2012	Lakeland Flying Tigers	3–2	Jupiter Hammerheads
2013	Daytona Cubs	3–1	Charlotte Stone Crabs
2014	Fort Myers Miracle	3–1	Daytona Cubs
2015	Charlotte Stone Crabs	3–1	Daytona Tortugas
2016	Bradenton Marauders	3–1	Tampa Yankees
2017^{[e]}	Dunedin Blue Jays; Palm Beach Cardinals	Championship series canceled due to Hurricane Irma	
2018	Fort Myers Miracle	3–1	Daytona Tortugas
2019^{[f]}	Postseason canceled due to Hurricane Dorian		
2020^{[g]}	Season canceled due to COVID-19 pandemic		
2021	Bradenton Marauders	3–0	Tampa Tarpons
2022	St. Lucie Mets	2–0	Dunedin Blue Jays
2023	Jupiter Hammerheads	2–1	Clearwater Threshers
2024	Palm Beach Cardinals	2–1	Lakeland Flying Tigers
2025	Lakeland Flying Tigers	2–0	Daytona Tortugas
2026	Jupiter Hammerheads	2–1	Tampa Tarpons

== Championship wins by team ==
Active Florida State League teams appear in bold.

Wins	Team	Championship years
7	Orlando Tigers/Bulldogs/Colts/Senators/C.B.s	1921, 1923, 1927, 1946, 1948, 1950, 1955
6	**Daytona Cubs/Tortugas**	1995, 2000, 2004, 2008, 2011, 2013
6	Fort Lauderdale Yankees	1962, 1965, 1980, 1982, 1984, 1987
6	Miami Marlins/Orioles	1968, 1969, 1970, 1971, 1972, 1978
6	**St. Lucie Mets**	1988, 1996, 1998, 2003, 2006, 2022
6	St. Petersburg Saints/Cardinals/Devil Rays	1966, 1967, 1973, 1975, 1986, 1997
5	**Lakeland Tigers/Flying Tigers**	1976, 1977, 1992, 2012, 2025
5	**Tampa Yankees/Tarpons**	1994, 2001, 2004, 2009, 2010
4	Daytona Beach Islanders/Astros	1981, 1940, 1948, 1953
4	Gainesville G-Men	1937, 1938, 1947, 1949
4	Sanford Celeryfeds/Lookouts/Seminoles	1919, 1926, 1939, 1940
4	St. Augustine Saints	1936, 1941, 1947, 1949
3	DeLand Red Hats	1950, 1951, 1952
3	**Palm Beach Cardinals**	2005, 2017, 2024
3	Tampa Tarpons	1957, 1959, 1961
2	**Bradenton Marauders**	2016, 2021
2	Charlotte Rangers	1989, 2002
2	**Clearwater Phillies/Threshers**	1993, 2007
2	Fort Lauderdale Tarpons-St. Petersburg Saints	1922, 1928
2	**Fort Myers Miracle**	2014, 2018
2	**Jupiter Hammerheads**	2023, 2026
2	Leesburg Anglers	1938, 1941
2	Tampa Smokers	1920, 1925
2	Vero Beach Dodgers	1983, 1990
2	West Palm Beach Expos	1974, 1991
1	Brevard County Manatees	2001
1	Charlotte Stone Crabs	2015
1	Cocoa Indians	1956
1	**Dunedin Blue Jays**	2017
1	Fort Myers Royals	1985
1	Kissimmee Cobras	1999
1	Lakeland Highlanders	1924
1	Lakeland Pilots	1954
1	Palatka Azaleas	1952
1	Palatka Redlegs	1960
1	Sarasota Sun Sox	1963
1	Winter Haven Red Sox	1979

== Notes ==
- ^{a} Fort Lauderdale-St. Petersburg had the best record when the league disbanded on July 4.
- ^{b} The Orlando Twins defeated Miami, 2–1, in the final round of the playoffs, but Miami was awarded the pennant based on best win–loss percentage.
- ^{c} Brevard County and Tampa were declared co-champions in the wake of the September 11 attacks, which caused a stoppage in professional baseball.
- ^{d} Daytona and Tampa were declared co-champions due to the threat of Hurricane Ivan.
- ^{e} Dunedin and Palm Beach were declared co-champions due to the threat of Hurricane Irma.
- ^{f} Playoffs were cancelled due to the threat of Hurricane Dorian.
- ^{g} The season was cancelled due to the COVID-19 pandemic
