= Orlando Nationals =

- 1942; Orlando, Florida

Minor league affiliations
- Class: Class D (1942)
- League: Florida East Coast League (1942)

Minor league titles
- League titles (1): 1942

Team data
- Name: Orlando Nationals (1942)
- Ballpark: Tinker Field (1942)

The Orlando Nationals were a minor league baseball team based in Orlando, Florida. In 1942, the Orlando Nationals played as members of the Rookie level Florida East Coast League, winning the league championship in a shortened season. The Nationals hosted minor league home games at Tinker Field.

The Orlando Nationals were immediately preceded and succeeded by the Orlando Senators of the Class D level Florida State League.

== History ==
The Orlando Nationals began play in the 1942 season. The 1941 Orlando Senators had ceased play when the Florida State League halted pay following the 1941 season due to World War II. The Orlando Nationals became members of the Florida East Coast League, which was playing a 1942 season.

The Florida East Coast League expanded from six teams to eight teams for the 1942 season, adding Orlando and the DeLand Red Hats from the Florida State League as additional franchises. The Cocoa Fliers, DeLand Red Hats, Fort Lauderdale Tarpons, Fort Pierce Bombers, Miami Beach Flamingos, Miami Seminoles and West Palm Beach Indians joined the Orlando Nationals in beginning Florida East Coach League play on April 15, 1942.

In their only season of play, the 1942 Orlando Nationals won the league championship, with the league folding during the season. On May 14, 1942, the Florida East Coast League folded. The Nationals were in first place with a 19–9 record when the league folded. Playing under manager Robert Overstreet, Orlando finished 1.5 games ahead of the second place Miami Beach Flamingos (17–10) in the final standings. Pitcher Scott Cary of Orlando led the Florida East Coast League with 45 strikeouts in the shortened season.

The Florida East Coast League folded following the partial 1942 season. The league next resumed play in 1972.

In 1946, Orlando, Florida again hosted the Orlando Senators, who resumed post World War II play with the Class D level Florida State League reforming.

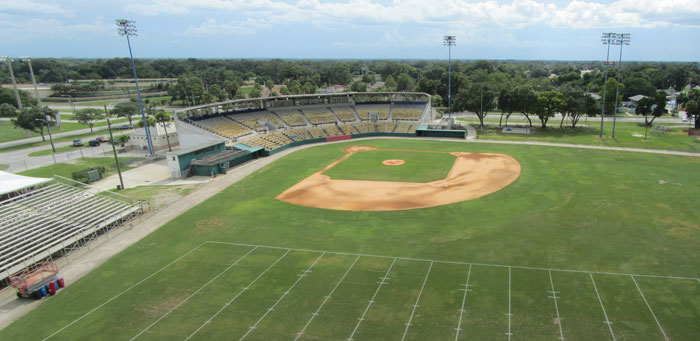
(2011) Tinker Field. Orlando, Florida.

== The ballpark ==
The Orlando Nationals played 1942 minor league home games at Tinker Field. Located adjacent to the Citrus Bowl after the Citrus Bowl construction in 1936, Tinker Field was a longtime home to minor league and spring training baseball. Listed on the National Register of Historic Places, Tinker Field was constructed in 1914 and was demolished in 2015 due to Citrus Bowl Expansion that was to infringe on the outfield portion of the field and render it unplayable. Today, the remaining ballpark area is home to the Tinker Field History Plaza.

== Year–by–year record ==
Year	Record	Finish	Manager	Playoffs/Notes
1964	19–9	1st	Robert Overstreet	League champions League folded May 14

== Notable alumni ==
- Scott Cary (1942)
- Cal Ermer (1942)
- Orlando Nationals players

== External references ==
- Orlando - Baseball Reference
