= Gaspar del Monte =

Cuban baseball player (1927–1995)

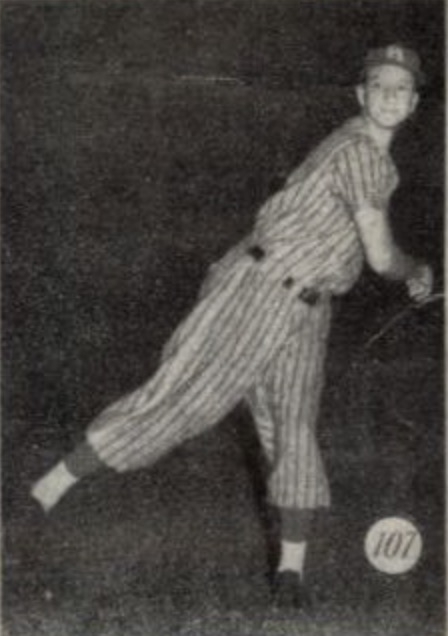
- Pitcher / manager
- Born: January 6, 1927; Havana, Cuba
- Died: December 29, 1995 (aged 68); Miami, Florida
- Batted: Unknown Threw: Right

Gaspar del Monte (January 6, 1927 — December 29, 1995), nicknamed Chulungo, was a Cuban baseball player, manager, and minor league executive.

Del Monte, born to a plantation owner west of Havana, studied at the international school Santiago de Cuba when he was signed by Joe Cambria. He spent four years in the Washington Senators organization, playing with Williamsport (1945), Charlotte (1946–1947), and Gadsden (1948). He also played extensively in the Florida International League, first with the Miami Beach Flamingos and later with the Havana Cubans. He managed the St. Petersburg Saints in 1955.

Del Monte pitched for Carta Vieja in the Panamanian League (1948), Patriotas in the Venezuelan League (1951), and Tigres del Licey in the Dominican Professional Baseball League (1953). In Venezuela, he worked to a 4.24 earned run average and a 1–1 record in 1951–52. In the Dominican Republic, he was part of a Licey rotation that is still considered one of the best in Dominican baseball, which also included Diomedes and Federico Olivo, Santiago Ullrich, and Miguel Ángel Vargas; Del Monte, a knuckleballer, was on the mound for Licey's final playoff victory over Águilas Cibaeñas in the 1953 championship series. He played in the Colombian Professional Baseball League with the Torices de Cartagena, alongside his compatriot Pedro Pagés, from 1953 to 1955. For the 1955–56 season, he served as player manager of the Indios de Cartagena and led the team to a championship, defeating Vanytor of Barranquilla.

After his playing career ended, del Monte served as a plant supervisor for the US Rubber Company in Cuba. Briefly imprisoned after the Cuban Revolution, he was released after three months and fled to the United States by way of Jamaica; he took a job as groundskeeper for the Atlanta Crackers.

Del Monte was appointed general manager of the Single-A Miami Marlins in 1986, and in that capacity campaigned for the Caribbean Professional Baseball Confederation to bring the Caribbean Series to Miami (which would ultimately happen in 1990).

He died in Miami in 1995.
