= Havana Sugar Kings =

Cuban minor league baseball team (1946–1960)

- 1946–1960; Havana, Cuba

Minor league affiliations
- Class: Class AAA (1954–1960); Class B (1949–1953); Class C (1946–1948)
- League: International League (1954–1960); Florida International League (1946–1953)

Major league affiliations
- Team: Cincinnati Reds (1959–1960); Cincinnati Redlegs (1955–1958); Washington Senators (1947–1952)

Minor league titles
- League titles (3): 1947; 1948; 1959

Team data
- Name: Havana Sugar Kings (1954–1960); Havana Cubans/Cubanos (1946–1953)
- Ballpark: Gran Stadium

The Havana Sugar Kings (Spanish: Reyes del Azúcar) were a Cuban-based minor league baseball team that played from 1946 to 1960. From 1954 until 1960, they belonged in the Class AAA International League, affiliated with Major League Baseball's Cincinnati Reds. Their home stadium was Gran Estadio del Cerro (sometimes called Gran Stadium) in Havana.

== History ==
The Sugar Kings began life in 1946 as the Havana Cubans, founded by Washington Senators scout Joe Cambria. That year, they (rather than a Cuban League side) represented Cuba at the inaugural Interamerican Series, the predecessor to the modern Caribbean Series.

Led by manager Oscar Rodriguez, the Cubans experienced tremendous success both on and off the field. Havana finished first in Class C (later Class B) Florida International League in each of their first five seasons of play, winning over 100 games twice and compiling a record of 474-249 in five years under Rodriguez. The overall record would be even better had Havana not been stripped of 17 wins in 1946 for having too many experienced players for their class. Nonetheless, the Cubans still had the league's top record even without the victories.

Havana then won consecutive FIL championships in 1947 and 1948. The 1947 Cubans were recognized as one of the 100 greatest minor league teams of all time. The team was also successful at the box office, leading the league in attendance each year from 1946-50. In their first three seasons, Havana led all Class C teams in attendance, including a mark of 264,813 in 1947 that is still the highest total ever recorded by a Class C franchise.

During the 1953 season, Roberto "Bobby" Maduro bought the team and immediately had aspirations of bringing Major League Baseball to Havana. After the 1953 season, the Springfield Cubs folded, leaving an opening in the Triple-A International League. Maduro moved his franchise to the IL and renamed it the Sugar Kings. After playing the 1954 season as an independent club, the franchise signed an agreement with the Cincinnati Reds for the 1955 season and the Sugar Kings became Cincinnati's top farm club for the remainder of their existence. In addition to Reds prospects, several talented Cuban players and other Latinos who eventually made it to the Major Leagues donned the Sugar Kings uniform, including Luis Arroyo, Pompeyo Davalillo, Tony González, Cookie Rojas, Elio Chacón, Danny Morejón, Preston Gómez, Leo Cárdenas, and Mike Cuellar.

In their inaugural season at the Triple-A level, the Sugar Kings drew 295,453 fans despite a fifth-place finish, second behind only pennant-winning Toronto. The next season, Havana won 87 games, their most in IL play, and drew a franchise-record 313,232 fans, again second to Toronto. However, the Sugar Kings were eliminated by the Maple Leafs in the Governors' Cup playoffs.

The next three seasons were less successful, as Havana finished with identical 72-82 records in 1956-57, finishing in sixth place both years. In 1957, attendance cratered to 84,320, less than half that of any other IL club. However, despite a franchise-worst 65-88 record and last-place finish in 1958, attendance rebounded to 178,000.

=== 1959 championship ===
In 1959, led by future major league manager Preston Gómez, the Sugar Kings rebounded to finish 80-73, finishing third in the IL standings. Amid revolution in Cuba that saw Fidel Castro rise to power, the Sugar Kings did not escape the turmoil. The most notable incident occurred on the night of July 25 in a home game against the Rochester Red Wings. As the game dragged on into extra innings, the clock passed midnight to the 26th, marking the anniversary of the beginning of the Cuban Revolution. Celebratory gunfire outside the ballpark grazed Cincinnati shortstop Leo Cardenas and third base coach Frank Verdi, who both sustained minor injuries. Rochester pulled their team off the field and left Cuba, cancelling the final game of the series.

However, the Sugar Kings were allowed to finish out their schedule and returned to the postseason. In the playoffs, Havana swept the Columbus Jets 4-0 and defeated the Richmond Virginians 4-2 to win the Governors' Cup. They then took on the Minneapolis Millers of the American Association in the Junior World Series. After two games with small crowds and frigid conditions at Metropolitan Stadium, the decision was made to move the balance of the series to Havana.

On their home turf, the Sugar Kings took the series the distance, rallying to walk off in Game 7 to take the series 4-3. The five games in Havana drew 100,000 people.

=== Nationalization and departure from Cuba ===
In 1960, Castro nationalized all U.S.-owned enterprises in Cuba, and on July 8, Baseball Commissioner Ford Frick (under pressure from Secretary of State Christian Herter) announced that the Sugar Kings would move to Jersey City, New Jersey, and became the Jersey City Jerseys. They lasted only through the 1961 season, then folded due to poor attendance. The franchise was then sold to a Florida group from Jacksonville and became the Jacksonville Suns, who began play in the International League in 1962. That franchise moved to Portsmouth, Virginia, in 1969 and became the Tidewater Tides, and remains in that region as the Norfolk Tides.

In February 1987, the Miami City Commission voted unanimously in favor of the renaming Miami Stadium in honor of Bobby Maduro, who had migrated to USA. The ballpark became known officially as Bobby Maduro Miami Stadium one month later.

== 2021 Miami Marlins alternate uniform ==
On May 17, 2021, The Miami Marlins unveiled a new alternate uniform which pays homage to the old Sugar Kings uniform.

== Season-by-season record ==
Season	PDC	League	Finish	Wins	Losses	Win%	Postseason	Manager	Attendance
Havana Cubans
1946	WAS	Florida International	1st	76	41	.650	Lost semifinals vs. West Palm Beach 3-2	Oscar Rodriguez	202,875
1947	WAS	Florida International	1st	105	45	.700	Won semifinals vs. Miami 3-2; Won finals vs. Tampa 4-0	Oscar Rodriguez	264,813
1948	WAS	Florida International	1st	97	57	.630	Won semifinals vs. Lakeland 3-0; Won finals vs. Tampa 4-3	Oscar Rodriguez	205,967
Havana Cubanos
1949	WAS	Florida International	1st	95	57	.625	Won semifinals vs. Miami Beach 3-2; Lost finals vs. Tampa 4-0	Oscar Rodriguez	226,293
1950	WAS	Florida International	1st	101	49	.673	Won semifinals vs. Tampa 3-0; Lost finals vs. Miami 4-1	Oscar Rodriguez	168,419
1951	WAS	Florida International	5th	68	71	.489	—	Dolf Luque	83,051
1952	WAS	Florida International	5th	76	77	.497	—	Mike Guerra	81,463
1953	—	Florida International	4th	63	69	.477	Lost semifinals vs. Fort Lauderdale	Armando Marsans	23,460
Havana Sugar Kings
1954	—	International	4th	78	77	.503	—	Reggie Otero	295,453
1955	CIN	International	3rd	87	66	.569	Lost semifinal vs. Toronto	Reggie Otero	313,232
1956	CIN	International	6th	72	82	.468	—	Reggie Otero/Nap Reyes	220,357
1957	CIN	International	6th	72	82	.468	—	Nap Reyes	84,320
1958	CIN	International	8th	65	88	.425	—	Nap Reyes/Tony Pacheco	178,340
1959	CIN	International	3rd	80	73	.523	Won semifinals vs. Columbus 4-0; Won Governors' Cup vs. Richmond 4-2; Won Junior World Series vs. Minneapolis 4-3	Preston Gomez	200,094
Havana Sugar Kings/Jersey City Jerseys
1960	CIN	International	5th	76	77	.497	—	Tony Castano/Nap Reyes	121,755

Regular season champion	League champions

=== Interamerican Series record ===
Year	Venue	Finish	Wins	Losses	Win%	Manager
1946	(Venezuela) Caracas	2nd	6	6	.500	(Puerto Rico) Oscar Rodriguez
Total			6	6	.500	

== Notable alumni ==
- Luis Arroyo (1959–60) MLB All-Star
- Sandy Consuegra (1949) MLB All-Star
- Mike Cuellar (1957–60) MLB All-Star
- Bobby Estalella (1950)
- Mike Fornieles (1952) MLB All-Star
- Preston Gomez (1959, MGR)
- Tony Gonzalez (baseball) (1958–59)
- Mike Guerra (1952, MGR)
- Connie Marrero (1947-1949) MLB All-Star, 2015 Caribbean Baseball Hall of Fame inductee
- Armando Marsans (1953, MGR)
- Orlando Pena (1957–58, '60) 2000 Caribbean Baseball Hall of Fame inductee
- Nap Reyes (1956–58, '60, MGR) 2015 Caribbean Baseball Hall of Fame inductee
- Cookie Rojas (1959–60) MLB All-Star

== See also ==
- Category:Havana Sugar Kings players
