= Max Rosenfeld =

American baseball player (1902–1969)

- Outfielder
- Born: December 23, 1902; New York City, U.S.
- Died: March 10, 1969 (aged 66); Miami, Florida, U.S.
- Batted: Right Threw: Right

MLB debut
- April 21, 1931, for the Brooklyn Robins

Last MLB appearance
- May 13, 1933, for the Brooklyn Dodgers

MLB statistics
- Batting average: .298
- Home runs: 2
- Runs batted in: 7
- Stats at Baseball Reference

Teams
- Brooklyn Robins/Dodgers (1931–1933)

Max Rosenfeld (December 23, 1902 – March 10, 1969) was an American professional baseball player who played outfield from 1931 to 1933 with the Brooklyn Robins/Dodgers.

== Biography ==
Rosenfeld was Jewish. He has a great background as both a baseball player and manager. He started out in both football and baseball as a student at the University of Alabama.

After college, he played for the St. Louis Browns of the American League as an outfielder. The Browns sent him to Birmingham, his home town team for two years, where he batted .302 and .344. He was later sold by the Browns to the Brooklyn Dodgers and he was farmed out to the Toledo Mud Hens of the American Association for two years, batting .352 and .330.

Next he went to play for the Hartford Conn. Senators in the Eastern League. Normally an outfielder, 28-year-old Rosenfeld was Hartford's regular second baseman in 1931, batting a .312 average with 3 home runs and 68 RBIs. And then Max was finally sent to the Majors, back to the Dodgers in Brooklyn for two years. He hit .298/.322/.474 with appearances in 42 games. Then Brooklyn farmed him out to Jersey City in the International League and when Jersey City's franchise was transferred to Syracuse he went there, and later to Newark for two years with the International League. He also played for Dallas, Tex., in the Texas League and then became manager of the Jackson, Miss., team in the Southeastern 'B' League. Later he became manager of the old Florida East Coast League for three years. He piloted the Miami Beach team in that league until it expired in 1942.

In January 1946 Rosenfeld became the manager of the new Miami Beach Flamingos franchise in the Florida International League. That team was aligned with the Boston Braves of the National League for provision of talent. By that time, Rosenfeld had already lived in Miami Beach for 21 years, where he eventually finished out his career in sports, and later retired.
