= Hank Majeski =

American baseball player (1916–1991)

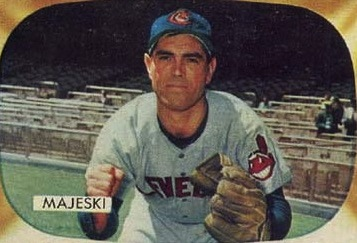
- Third baseman
- Born: December 13, 1916; Staten Island, New York, U.S.
- Died: August 9, 1991 (aged 74); Staten Island, New York, U.S.
- Batted: Right Threw: Right

MLB debut
- May 17, 1939, for the Boston Bees

Last MLB appearance
- July 26, 1955, for the Baltimore Orioles

MLB statistics
- Batting average: .279
- Home runs: 57
- Runs batted in: 501
- Stats at Baseball Reference

Teams
- Boston Bees / Braves (1939–1941); New York Yankees (1946); Philadelphia Athletics (1946–1949); Chicago White Sox (1950–1951); Philadelphia Athletics (1951–1952); Cleveland Indians (1952–1955); Baltimore Orioles (1955)

Henry Majeski (December 13, 1916 – August 9, 1991) was an American professional baseball player, coach and minor league manager. He played as a third baseman in Major League Baseball from 1939 to 1955 for the Boston Bees/Braves (1939–41), New York Yankees (1946), Philadelphia Athletics (1946–49 and 1951–52), Chicago White Sox (1950–51), Cleveland Indians (1952–55) and Baltimore Orioles (1955). He was known as one of his era's best fielding third basemen, setting a major league single-season record for third basemen with a .988 fielding percentage in 1947.

== Baseball career ==
Born in Staten Island, New York, Majeski began his professional baseball career as a second baseman in 1935 at 18 with the Eau Claire Bears of the Northern League. In his second season at Eau Claire, he posted a .365 batting average to finish as runner-up in the 1936 Northern League batting championship. His performance brought him to the attention of the Chicago Cubs, who signed him to a contract and sent him to play for their Minor League affiliate, the Moline Plowboys of the Three-I League. Majeski performed well, winning the 1937 Three-I League batting championship with a .345 batting average. He was traded to the Birmingham Barons of the Southern Association in 1938, where he hit for a .325 average.

The Boston Braves purchased Majeski's contract, then known as the Boston Bees, and he made his major league debut with the team on May 17, 1939, at 22. During his rookie season, Bees' manager Casey Stengel converted him into a third baseman. Majeski began the season hitting above .300 for the first half of the season before a mid-season slump saw his average dip to .238, but he recovered to finish the year with a .272 average and 7 home runs and 54 runs batted in.

Majeski only appeared in 19 games for the Bees in 1940, spending most of the season with the minor league Newark Bears, a New York Yankees farm team. Majeski hit for a .323 average during the Bears' season, then hit .478 in the postseason to help the Bears defeat the Louisville Colonels of the American Association in the 1940 Junior World Series. At the beginning of the 1941 season, Stengel decided to replace Majeski with Sibby Sisti as the Bees' third baseman, and in May 1941, his contract was purchased by the New York Yankees. In 1942, while playing for the Newark Bears, Majeski won the International League batting championship with a .345 batting average and was named the league's Most Valuable Player.

Majeski joined the United States Coast Guard in 1943 and missed the next three seasons before being discharged in November 1945. He reported back to the Yankees in 1946 and, after an impressive spring training performance, made the team as a utility player. After appearing in only eight games, his contract was sold to Connie Mack's Philadelphia Athletics in June 1946.

Majeski immediately became the starting third baseman for the Athletics, appearing in 78 games. On July 29, 1947, he escaped serious injury when he was hit in the head by a fastball thrown by Chicago White Sox pitcher Earl Harrist. He ended the season with a .280 batting average with 8 home runs, 72 runs batted in, and set a major league single-season record for third basemen with a .988 fielding percentage, breaking the previous mark set by Willie Kamm in 1933.

Majeski had his best season in 1948, hitting for a .310 batting average along with 12 home runs, 120 runs batted in, .368 on-base percentage, and a .454 slugging percentage. He led the league once again with a .975 fielding percentage, finished third in assists and putouts and finished 11th in voting for the 1948 American League Most Valuable Player Award. On August 27, 1948, Majeski set an American League record for most doubles in a doubleheader with 6.

Majeski was a member of the 1949 Philadelphia Athletics team that set a major league team record of 217 double plays, a record which still stood as of 2010. On August 7, 1949, Majeski was again hit in the head by a fastball, this time thrown by Cleveland Indians pitcher Early Wynn. Majeski seemed to fall out of favor with manager Connie Mack, and he would be traded to the Chicago White Sox before the 1950 season. He rebounded with the White Sox to post a .309 batting average with 6 home runs and 46 runs batted in. After only a year and a half with the White Sox, he was traded back to the Athletics in June 1951.

A year later, his contract was purchased by the Cleveland Indians, where he served as a utility infielder behind Al Rosen and helped tutor a young Bobby Ávila. Majeski helped the Indians win the 1954 American League Pennant, batting .281 with only 3 errors while backing up Rosen at third base and filling in as a second baseman when Avila was injured. He also hit a pinch-hit three-run home run in Game 4 of the 1954 World Series in a losing cause against the New York Giants. He was traded to the Baltimore Orioles in June 1955 and then retired as a player at the end of the season at 38.

== Career statistics ==
In a thirteen-year major league career, Majeski played in 1,069 games, accumulating 956 hits in 3,421 at-bats for a .279 career batting average along with 57 home runs and 501 runs batted in. In 1947, Majeski set a then-record .988 fielding percentage, still the fifth highest single-season average for third basemen in major league baseball history. He ended his career with a .968 fielding percentage, the eighteenth highest average for third basemen in major league history.

== Managing and coaching career ==
After retiring as a player, Majeski became a minor league manager in the Cleveland Indians organisation. In 1956, he managed the Daytona Beach Islanders to a fourth-place finish in the Florida State League, and in 1957, he led the Cocoa Indians to a sixth-place finish. He returned to baseball in 1973 to manage one final time for the New York Yankees organization with the Oneonta Yankees. Majeski also served as a scout for several teams. He was later Wagner College's baseball coach and the Houston Astros' batting coach.

Majeski died of cancer on Staten Island, New York, on August 9, 1991, at the age of 74.

== See also ==
- Van Lingle Mungo (song)
