= Flamingo Park (Florida) =

Park in Miami Beach, Florida, United States

Coordinates: 25°47′3″N 80°8′15″W

Flamingo Park

Flamingo Park is a 36-acre (15 ha) municipal park in heart of Miami Beach, Florida, that was previously Flamingo Field. It serves as a hub of recreation and sports activities for the community. Rich with amenities, it houses a baseball stadium, aquatic and tennis centers, a running track, turf fields, and a dog park.

The land's recreational use dates back to at least 1919, when a polo field was established there as part of Carl G. Fisher's developments, predating the opening of the nearby Flamingo Hotel.

The Flamingo Hotel, built by pioneering developer Carl G. Fisher and designed by Rubush & Hunter, opened on New Year's Eve 1920 at 15th Street and Bay Road; its grounds and associated amenities, including the polo field on the current park site, supported activities like speedboat racing, gondola rides, and social events.

The park has seen ongoing modern upgrades, including a 2005 playground redesign with GameTime featuring a rock-climbing wall and a 1950s choo-choo train, 2013 renovations to the tennis center (17 courts), football field/track, and other facilities, plus later master plan improvements for landscaping and pickleball courts.

Today, Flamingo Park has an aquatic center, sports fields, handball and racquetball courts, and ongoing projects like a new lodge and additional amenities expected into 2026.
