= Preston Gómez =

Cuban baseball player and manager (1923–2009)

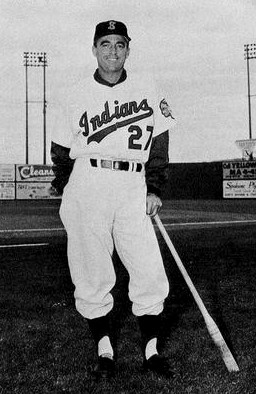
- Gómez as manager of the Spokane Indians
- Infielder / Manager
- Born: April 20, 1923; Central Preston, Oriente Province, Cuba
- Died: January 13, 2009 (aged 85); Fullerton, California, U.S.
- Batted: Right Threw: Right

MLB debut
- May 5, 1944, for the Washington Senators

Last MLB appearance
- August 12, 1944, for the Washington Senators

MLB statistics
- Batting average: .286
- Home runs: 0
- Runs batted in: 2
- Managerial record: 346–529
- Winning %: .395
- Stats at Baseball Reference
- Managerial record at Baseball Reference

Teams
- As player: Washington Senators (1944); As manager: San Diego Padres (1969–1972); Houston Astros (1974–1975); Chicago Cubs (1980); As coach: Los Angeles Dodgers (1965–1968); Houston Astros (1973); St. Louis Cardinals (1976); Los Angeles Dodgers (1977–1979); California Angels (1981–1984)

Career highlights and awards
- World Series champion (1965)

Preston Gómez (born Pedro Gómez Martínez; April 20, 1923 – January 13, 2009) was a Cuban-born infielder, manager, coach and front-office official in Major League Baseball (MLB), best known for managing three major league clubs: the San Diego Padres (1969–72), Houston Astros (1974–75) and Chicago Cubs (1980). Born in Central Preston (now Guatemala), Cuba, he was given his nickname in U.S. professional baseball from his birthplace.

== Playing career ==
A right-handed batter and thrower, Gómez was listed as 5 feet 11 inches (1.80 m) tall and 170 pounds (77 kg). He played eight major league games as a shortstop and second baseman for the 1944 Washington Senators, hitting .286 in seven at bats with two runs batted in.

== Minor leagues ==
He spent the next two decades in minor league baseball, as a player between 1944 and 1955, and then as manager of the Diablos Rojos del México, the "Mexico City Reds," in 1957 and 1958. He then managed in the farm systems of the Cincinnati Reds, Los Angeles Dodgers and New York Yankees. His 1959 Havana Sugar Kings were champion of the International League and won the Junior World Series; the following season, his Spokane Indians won 91 games and the 1960 Pacific Coast League championship.

== Managerial and coaching career ==
=== Early career ===
In 1965, Gómez became third-base coach of the Dodgers, serving under Walter Alston through 1968 and on two National League pennant-winners and one World Series champion.

=== San Diego Padres ===
When Dodger executive vice president Buzzie Bavasi became president and part-owner of the expansion Padres, he named Gómez the first skipper in the team's major league history in August 1968. But, like most expansion teams, the Padres struggled, losing 110 games in 1969, 99 in 1970 and 100 more in 1971, finishing last in the NL West Division each season. After 11 games and seven more defeats in 1972, Gómez was fired April 26 and replaced by Don Zimmer. With the Padres, he had a record of 180 wins and 316 losses.

=== Houston Astros ===
He returned to baseball the following season as a coach under Baseball Hall of Fame skipper Leo Durocher for the Houston Astros. His 1973 campaign included interim stints as manager in April and August when the 68-year-old Durocher fell ill; the Astros strongly responded to Gómez, going 16–5 (.762) under him during those temporary assignments. When Durocher retired from baseball at season's end, Gómez succeeded to the manager's post in 1974.

That season, the Astros posted an 81–81 record — Gómez' only .500 or better season as a permanent big league manager. But in 1975, the Astros were staggered by the off-season accidental death of starting pitcher Don Wilson. They began the year by losing 16 of their 24 April games, and were still in last place in the NL West after 127 games (at 47–80) on August 18. On that day, Gómez was released in favor of Bill Virdon. As the Astros' pilot, he finished with a record of 128 wins and 161 losses.

Once again, Gómez took to the coaching lines, for the St. Louis Cardinals (1976) and then back to the Dodgers (1977–79), where he assisted Tommy Lasorda for three seasons and coached in two more World Series — 1977 and 1978.

=== Chicago Cubs and California Angels ===
The exposure led to one last major league managing job, with the 1980 Cubs — but again Gómez met with frustration. The last-place Cubs dropped 52 of their first 90 games, and on July 23 Gómez was fired again, to be replaced by Joey Amalfitano. Not counting his interim role with Houston in 1973, his career managing record, over seven years, was 346 wins, 529 losses (.395) with four last-place finishes.

Highly respected, Gómez remained in baseball as third-base coach (1981–84) of the California Angels, then served the Angels' organization as a special assignments scout and assistant to the general manager from 1985 until his death.

=== Ongoing no-hitters aborted ===
On two occasions, Gómez sent in pinch-hitters to hit for pitchers who had pitched no-hitters through eight innings. He did this on July 21, 1970, with the Padres' Clay Kirby and on September 4, 1974, with the Astros' Wilson. Both pitchers were losing their respective games at the time they were pulled. In both cases, the hitting strategy failed, and the games were ultimately lost.

=== Managerial record ===
Team	From	To	Record		
Team	From	To	W	L	Win %
San Diego Padres	1969	1972	180	316	.363
Houston Astros	1974	1975	128	161	.443
Chicago Cubs	1980	1980	38	52	.422
Total			346	529	.395
Ref.:

== Death ==
Gómez sustained major head injuries when he was struck by the driver of a vehicle at a Blythe, California, gas station on March 26, 2008. The crash occurred while Gómez was on his way home to Chino Hills, California, from the Angels' spring training in Arizona. He died from his injuries on January 13, 2009, in Fullerton, California, aged 85.

The 2009 Los Angeles Angels of Anaheim honored Gómez' memory with a uniform patch in the shape of a black diamond with the name "Preston" written in white.

== See also ==
- List of St. Louis Cardinals coaches

Sporting positions
Preceded by Tony Pacheco	Havana Sugar Kings manager 1959	Succeeded by Nap Reyes
Preceded by Bobby Bragan	Spokane Indians manager 1960–1962	Succeeded by Danny Ozark
Preceded by Sheriff Robinson	Richmond Virginians manager 1963–1964	Succeeded by Franchise relocated
Preceded by Pete Reiser; Tommy Lasorda	Los Angeles Dodgers third base coach 1965–1968; 1977–1979	Succeeded by Danny Ozark; Danny Ozark
Preceded by Salty Parker	Houston Astros third base coach 1973	Succeeded by Grady Hatton
Preceded by Vern Benson	St. Louis Cardinals third base coach 1976	Succeeded by Jack Krol
Preceded by Bobby Knoop	California Angels third base coach 1981–1984	Succeeded by Moose Stubing
