= Flamingo Field =

US sportsfield

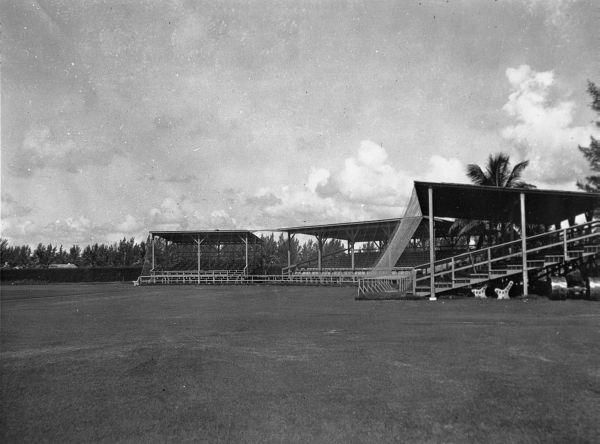
- Flamingo Field in 1935
- Interactive map of Flamingo Field
- Former names: Flamingo Park
- Location: 15th St & N Michigan Ave, Miami Beach, Florida 33139
- Coordinates: 25°47′9″N 80°8′16″W
- Capacity: 3,000
- Surface: Grass
- Field size: Left Field – 335 ft Center Field – 386 ft Right Field – ft

Construction
- Built: 1925

Tenants
- Major League Spring Training; New York Giants (NL) (1934–1935); Philadelphia Phillies (NL) (1940–1942, 1946); Pittsburgh Pirates (NL) (1947); Minor League Baseball; Miami Beach Tigers/Flamingos (FECL) (1940–1942); Miami Beach Flamingos (FIL) (1946–1952, 1954)

Flamingo Field is a ballpark at the corner of 15th Street and Michigan Avenue in Miami Beach, Florida. It was the home of Miami Beach minor-league clubs, as well as the spring training home of the New York Giants in 1934 and 1935, the Philadelphia Phillies from 1940 to 1942, and again in 1946, and the Pittsburgh Pirates in 1947. Capacity was approximately 3,000 for baseball. The center field fence was 386 feet from homeplate. The park was also referred to as "Flamingo Park," which is also the name of the area in which it was located.

Flamingo Field was home to the Class D Florida East Coast League Miami Tigers in 1940, who changed their nickname to the Miami Beach Flamingos in 1941 and won the League championship that year. The FECL folded in May 1942 due to World War II. After the War, the Flamingos joined the new Class C Florida International League in 1946. The Flamingos played the 1952 season, sat-out 1953, and rejoined in 1954 only to move across Biscayne Bay to Miami during the 1954 season.

In addition to baseball, the field was used for multiple purposes. Duquesne practiced at Flamingo Field in December 1936 prior to the 1937 Orange Bowl. The Georgia Bulldogs football team practiced at Flamingo Field in December 1941 prior to the 1942 Orange Bowl in which they defeated TCU.

When the Phillies held spring training at the ballpark in 1942, box seats cost $1.65, (Note: $31.87 in 2024.) the grandstand was $1.10, (Note: $21.24 in 2024.) and bleacher seats $0.55. (Note: $10.62 in 2024.)

In 1956, the field was rundown but was being used by the Miami Beach and St. Patrick's high school baseball teams. Today, the site is still in use as public park with a ballpark, known as Flamingo Park.

== Current structure ==
In 1967, the City of Miami Beach constructed a new ballpark on the site of the old Flamingo Park. The new park sat 535 and had locker rooms which, while sufficient for recreation and amateur baseball, would prevent the park from attracting professional clubs. In September 1968, there was talk of the expansion Montreal Expos conducting spring training at Flamingo Park if other options did not work out for the club. In November 1968, the New York Mets considered training at Flamingo Park in 1969 despite the size. The idea was vetoed by the Miami Beach Director of Parks and Recreation who wanted to reserve the field for local use.

This structure and the field remain today, with Flamingo Park undergoing major renovations in 2013.
