= Herb Thomas (outfielder) =

American baseball player and manager (1902-1991)

- Outfielder / Second baseman
- Born: May 26, 1901; Sampson City, Florida, U.S.
- Died: December 4, 1991 (aged 90); Starke, Florida, U.S.
- Batted: Right Threw: Right

MLB debut
- August 24, 1924, for the Boston Braves

Last MLB appearance
- September 22, 1927, for the New York Giants

MLB statistics
- Batting average: .221
- Home runs: 1
- Runs batted in: 15

Teams
- Boston Braves (1924–1925, 1927); New York Giants (1927)

Herbert Mark Thomas (May 26, 1901 – December 4, 1991) was an American right-handed minor and major league baseball player and minor league manager. Although his major league career lasted only three seasons, 1924, 1925 and 1927, for two different teams, the Boston Braves and New York Giants, his minor league career spanned 17 seasons. He played professionally in three different decades.

== Features ==
Thomas threw and batted right-handed. He was only 5 ft 4.5 in (1.64 m) tall and he weighed only 157 pounds.

== Before professional baseball ==
Prior to playing professionally, Thomas served in World War I.

== Professional baseball career ==
Thomas' minor league career began in 1922 at the age of 20 with the Jacksonville Indians. He played in 112 games with them, hitting .298 with 19 doubles, 14 triples and four home runs in 426 at-bats. The following season, Thomas played for the Daytona Beach Islanders, hitting .387 with 13 doubles, five triples and no home runs in only 297 at-bats. He played for the Islanders in 1924, who became the Clearwater Pelicans partway that season, hitting .345 with 32 doubles, eight triples and three home runs in 94 games. His minor league performance that season was so impressive that he was purchased by the Braves from Daytona Beach on August 9, and on August 18 he made his major league debut. In 32 major league games in 1924, he hit .220 with only six extra-base hits in 127 at-bats.

In 1925, Thomas mostly played for the Worcester Panthers, hitting .338 with 33 doubles, five triples and four home runs in 126 games. He also spent five games in the big leagues that season, hitting .235 in 17 at-bats. With the Providence Rubes in 1926, the 24-year-old Thomas hit .326 with 38 doubles, 12 triples and three home runs in 620 games, over the course of 153 games.

Thomas did not play in the minors in 1927. He spent 24 games with the Braves, hitting .230 in 74 at-bats with them. On June 12, he was traded to the Giants with Larry Benton and Zack Taylor for Doc Farrell, Kent Greenfield and Hugh McQuillan. He played 13 games with the Giants, hitting .176 in 17 at-bats. Overall, he hit .220 in 37 games that year. On September 22, he played his final big league game.

Although his major league career was over, Thomas' minor league career was years from completion – he would end up playing until 1942. He played for the Buffalo Bisons in 1928, hitting .326 with 34 doubles, seven triples and ten home runs in 154 games. He played for the Bisons and Toledo Mud Hens in 1929, hitting a combined .307 with 22 doubles, five triples and 14 home runs in 137 games. With the Newark Bears and Bisons in 1930, Thomas played a total of 168 games, hitting .322 with 43 doubles, 12 triples and 19 home runs in 677 at-bats.

His averaged dipped to .276 in 1931, while playing again for Newark. That season, he hit 34 doubles, four triples and six home runs. For the Montreal Royals in 1932, Thomas hit .306 with 36 doubles, seven triples and five home runs in 142 games. In 1933, he struggled mightily while splitting the season between three teams – the Harrisburg Senators, Jersey City Skeeters and Albany Senators – hitting only .235 with 26 doubles, no triples and one home run in 107 games. He played only eight games in 1934, all for the Lima Buckeyes. In those eight games, he hit only .148 with one double and one triple.

Thomas did not play professionally in 1935, although he did play in 1936. He split the season between the Jacksonville Tars and Augusta Tigers, hitting a combined .277 with 18 doubles, four triples and no home runs in 94 games. As in 1935, Thomas did not play professionally in 1937. He came back in 1938, however, hitting .250 with five doubles, no triples and no home runs in 52 games for the Palatka Azaleas.

Once again, Thomas skipped a season, not playing professionally in 1939. He came back strong in 1940, when – at 38 years old – he hit .352 with 25 doubles, one triple and no home runs in 389 at-bats for the Fort Lauderdale Tarpons. He hit above .300 in 1941 as well, hitting .301 in 96 games, splitting the season between Fort Lauderdale and the Greenville Lions. 1942 was his final professional season – in only eight games for the West Palm Beach Indians, he hit .185 in 27 at-bats.

Overall, Thomas' major league career lasted only 74 games. He hit only .221 with 11 doubles, four triples and one home run in 235 big league at-bats. His minor league career was far more successful, however. In 17 seasons, he hit .312 in 1760 games. In 6676 at-bats, he collected 2080 hits, 397 of which were doubles, 88 of which were triples and 71 of which were home runs.

== After professional baseball ==
Thomas served in World War II following his baseball career. He engaged in the lumber business and later operated Herb's Restaurant in Starke, Florida.

Following his death, he was interred at Oak Hill Cemetery in Palatka, Florida.
