= Key West Cubs =

- 1969–1975; (1969, 1971-1975); Key West, Florida

Minor league affiliations
- Previous classes: Class A
- League: Florida State League

Major league affiliations
- Previous teams: Chicago Cubs (1974–1975); San Diego Padres (1969)

Team data
- Previous names: Key West Cubs (1975); Key West Conchs (1972–1974); Key West Sun Caps (1971); Key West Padres (1969)
- Previous parks: Wickers Stadium

The Key West Cubs were a Class A minor league baseball affiliate of the Chicago Cubs in 1975. The team played its home games at Wickers Stadium in Key West, Florida. Prior to being named the Cubs, the team was known as the Key West Conchs from 1972–1974, and the year before that, they were called the Key West Sun Caps. However the team was founded in 1969 as the Key West Padres.

== History ==
=== Padres ===
The 1969 season was the first in the Major League history of the San Diego Padres franchise. Prior to the 1969 Padres, Key West had not played host to a professional team since 1952 when the Key West Conchs of the Florida International League played a partial season at Wickers Stadium. The team would enjoy a successful first season with a 66-64 record, which was good enough for a third-place finish in the Southern Division of the FSL. The 1969 Key West Padres were managed by legendary future Major League manager, Don Zimmer.

At the end of the season Padres management would fold the team and move much of their minor league operations to the west coast. The City of Key West would not have a team in the 1970 season, however, in 1971 a new team, the Key West Sun Caps would emerge.

=== Sun Caps ===
After not hosting baseball in 1970, the Sun Caps were established. The Sun Caps would not be affiliated with one Major League Club but would rather be known as a Co-Op team, made up of a few players from a number of organizations. The Sun Caps were typically cast-off players and most of the time when a player showed promise he was moved to a different team. They were the only team in the 12 team league that was not affiliated with just one big-league club. As such the Sun Caps suffered through a 45-93 record which placed them dead last in the FSL.

=== Conchs ===
After the 1971 season the Sun Caps would still remain a co-op team, but were renamed the Key West Conchs. The Conchs became affiliated with the Chicago Cubs for the 1974 season, but posted their worst record yet that season: 37 wins - 94 losses.

=== Cubs ===
The next year, 1975, the team was renamed for their Major League affiliate, becoming the Key West Cubs for their final season in Key West. The team would enjoy a successful season with a 65-69 record, which was good enough for a second-place finish in the Southern Division of the FSL. The Cubs would lose in the first round of the playoffs.

At the end of the season Cubs management would move the team to Pompano Beach, Florida and rename them the Pompano Beach Cubs. The 1975 Key West Cubs would be the last professional team, to date, to be based in Key West.

== Notable alumni ==
- Bruce Sutter (1974) Inducted Baseball Hall of Fame, 2006
- Nino Espinosa (1971)
- Mike Krukow (1974) MLB All-Star
- Donnie Moore (1974) MLB All-Star
- Bob Lacey (1973)
- Dennis Lamp (1974) MLB All-Star
- Don Zimmer (1969, MGR) 2x MLB All-Star; 1989 NL Manager of the Year
