= Harley Hisner =

American baseball player (1926–2015)

- Pitcher
- Born: November 6, 1926; Maples, Indiana, U.S.
- Died: March 20, 2015 (aged 88); Fort Wayne, Indiana, U.S.
- Batted: Right Threw: Right

MLB debut
- September 30, 1951, for the Boston Red Sox

Last MLB appearance
- September 30, 1951, for the Boston Red Sox

MLB statistics
- Win–loss record: 0–1
- Earned run average: 4.50
- Innings: 6
- Stats at Baseball Reference

Teams
- Boston Red Sox (1951)

Harley Parnell Hisner (November 6, 1926 – March 20, 2015) was an American starting pitcher in Major League Baseball who played in one game for the Boston Red Sox during the 1951 season. Listed at 6 ft (1.8 m), 185 lb (84 kg), he batted and threw right-handed.

In 1943, Hisner was the number two starter for City Light, a semipro baseball team in Fort Wayne, Indiana, that also included future Major League Baseball (MLB) pitchers Scott Cary and Ned Garver.

In his only MLB appearance, Hisner started the final game of the 1951 season for Boston against the New York Yankees. In six innings pitched, he gave up three earned runs, four bases on balls and seven hits, with three strikeouts — two of them being against Mickey Mantle, then a rookie. He was the losing pitcher (the Yanks' Spec Shea hurled a 3–0 shutout for the BoSox' ninth consecutive defeat) and Hisner never again appeared in a Major League game. In that same game, Hisner gave up Joe DiMaggio's last regular season hit.

On April 20, 2012, Hisner was one of nearly 200 former Red Sox players and coaches who returned to Fenway Park as part of Fenway's 100th Anniversary celebration. He died of cancer in 2015.
