= Cocoa Astros (FECL) =

- 1972; Cocoa, Florida

Minor league affiliations
- Previous classes: Class Rookie League
- League: Florida East Coast League

The Cocoa Astros were a short-lived professional minor league baseball team based Cocoa, Florida in 1972. Managed by Leo Posada, the club was a member of the rookie-level Florida East Coast League. During their only season in existence, the team posted a 26–30 record, which gave them third place in the league.

== Notable alumni ==
- Al Javier
- Leo Posada
- Luis Sánchez
- Rick Williams
