= Pep Rambert =

American baseball player (1916–1974)

- Pitcher
- Born: August 1, 1916; Cleveland, Ohio, U.S.
- Died: November 16, 1974 (aged 58); West Palm Beach, Florida, U.S.
- Batted: Right Threw: Right

MLB debut
- September 23, 1939, for the Pittsburgh Pirates

Last MLB appearance
- September 29, 1940, for the Pittsburgh Pirates

MLB statistics
- Win–loss record: 0–1
- Earned run average: 8.25
- Strikeouts: 4
- Stats at Baseball Reference

Teams
- Pittsburgh Pirates (1939–1940)

Elmer Donald "Pep" Rambert (August 1, 1916 – November 16, 1974) was an American pitcher in Major League Baseball (MLB). He played for the Pittsburgh Pirates.

Rambert's only decision came on the final day of his MLB career when he surrendered 8 runs in a 3–11 loss to the Cincinnati Reds at Crosley Field.

In the minor leagues, he played both pitcher and outfielder, beginning with the Leesburg Gondoliers and St. Augustine Saints of the Florida State League in 1937. During the latter part of his minor league career he was a player manager for the Cairo Egyptians (1946), Federalsburg A's (1947), Hagerstown Owls (1948), Eastman Dodgers (1951), and Cocoa Indians (1952).
