= Florida East Coast League =

American minor league baseball circuit

- Classification: Class D (1940–1942); Rookie (1972)
- Sport: Minor League Baseball
- First season: 1940
- Folded: 1972
- President: Judge Gordon Lynn (1940); J. B. Lemon (1941–1942)
- No. of teams: 13
- Country: United States
- Most titles: 1 Fort Lauderdale Tarpons (1940); Miami Beach Flamingos (1941); Orlando Nationals (1942; Melbourne Reds (1972)
- Related competitions: Gulf Coast League

The Florida East Coast League was the name of two American minor league baseball circuits based on the Atlantic coast of Florida. The first edition of the league operated as a Class D level league from 1940 to 1942. The league reformed for the 1972 season as a Rookie level league before folding.

== History ==
The first incarnation of the FECL was as a Class D circuit that played from 1940 through May 14, 1942. It shut its doors, along with many other minor leagues, a few months after the United States entered World War II, and, despite the postwar baseball boom, it was not revived.

The second Florida East Coast League was a Rookie-class "complex league" owned and operated by Major League Baseball clubs. It existed for one season — 1972 — and was intended to provide a second Florida-based league for 18- and 19-year-old players, along with the established Gulf Coast League, which was then concentrated along the west coast of Florida. The FECL of 1972 featured four teams based at minor league training complexes in Cocoa and Melbourne.

== FECL teams, 1940–1942 ==
- Cocoa Beach Fliers
- DeLand Red Hats
- Fort Lauderdale Tarpons (champions, 1940)
- Fort Pierce Bombers
- Hollywood Chiefs
- Miami Beach Flamingos (champions, 1941)
- Miami Beach Tigers
- Miami Seminoles
- Miami Wahoos
- Orlando Senators
- West Palm Beach Indians

== FECL teams, 1972 ==
- Cocoa Astros
- Cocoa Expos
- Melbourne Reds (champions)
- Melbourne Twins

== Standings & statistics ==
=== 1940 to 1942 ===
1940 Florida East Coast League

Team standings	W	L	PCT	GB	Managers
Ft. Lauderdale Tarpons	69	40	.623	--	Herb Thomas
Hollywood Chiefs	62	47	.569	7	Jiggs Donahue
Miami Beach Tigers	60	51	.541	10	Fred Heimach
West Palm Beach Indians	52	60	.464	18½	Cecil Downs / Joe Murff
Ft. Pierce Bombers	49	65	.430	22½	Lance Richbourg / Ray Phelps
Miami Wahoos	42	71	.372	29	Max Carey

Playoffs: Ft. Lauderdale 3 games, West Palm Beach 1; Miami Beach 3 games, Hollywood 0.
Finals: Ft. Lauderdale 4 games, Miami Beach 1.

Player statistics
Player	Team	Stat	Tot	Player	Team	Stat	Tot
Jack Westley	Ft. Laud/Hollywood	BA	.377	Chet Covington	Hollywood	W	21
Jack Westley	Ft. Laud/Hollywood	Runs	96	Chet Covington	Hollywood	SO	212
Pecky Engel	West Palm/Ft.Pierce	Hits	158	Gene Bearden	Miami Beach	ERA	1.63
Jack Westley	Ft. Laud/Hollywood	RBI	98	Oliver Kelly	Miami	HR	11
Jack Westley	Ft. Laud/Hollywood	HR	11	Dale Lynch	Miami Beach	HR	11

1941 Florida East Coast League

Team standings	W	L	PCT	GB	Managers
West Palm Beach Indians	84	55	.604	--	Harry Hughes
Miami Beach Flamingos	81	58	.583	3	Max Rosenfeld
Ft. Pierce Bombers	75	64	.540	9	Jim Poole
Ft. Lauderdale Tarpons	66	73	.475	18	Herb Thomas / Buster Kinard
Miami Wahoos	63	76	.453	21	Archie Martin
Cocoa Fliers	48	91	.345	36	Jesse Cleveland / Bill Doak

Playoffs: Miami Beach 3 games, Fort Pierce 1; West Palm Beach 3 games, Ft. Lauderdale 2.
Finals: Miami Beach 4 games, West Palm Beach 2.

Player statistics
Player	Team	Stat	Tot	Player	Team	Stat	Tot
John Douglas	Miami	BA	.385	Gibbs Miller	Ft. Lauderdale	W	23
John Douglas	Miami	Runs	111	Milt Rosenstein	Miami Beach	SO	238
Buster Kinard	Ft. Lauderdale	Hits	210	Chet Covington	Ft. Pierce	ERA	1.90
Buster Kinard	Ft. Lauderdale	RBI	123	Joe Murff	Ft.Pierce	HR	21

1942 Florida East Coast League schedule

Team standings	W	L	PCT	GB	Managers
Orlando Nationals	19	9	.679	--	Robert Overstreet
Miami Beach Flamingos	17	10	.630	1½	Max Rosenfeld
DeLand Red Hats	13	13	.500	5	Bill Cates
Ft. Pierce Bombers	12	14	.462	6	Russ Maxcy
Miami Seminoles	12	15	.444	6½	Harry Hughes
West Palm Beach Indians	9	18	.333	9½	Al Reitz
Ft. Lauderdale Tarpons	4	3	.571	NA	Herb Thomas
Cocoa Fliers	0	4	.000	NA	Burl Munsell

Cocoa folded April 21; Ft. Lauderdale folded May 14.
League folded May 14.

Player statistics
Player	Team	Stat	Tot	Player	Team	Stat	Tot
Bill Hansen	Ft. Pierce	BA	.370	Larry Baldwin	Miami	W	6
John Morris	Orlando	Runs	27	Scott Carey	Orlando	SO	45
Jim Milner	Miami Beach	Hits	38	Williard Eckenroth	DeLand	ERA	1.65
William Tracy	DeLand	RBI	23	Fred Leonhardt	DeLand	HR	2
Pete Burnette	West Palm Beach	HR	2	Armando Dominguez	Orlando	HR	2

=== 1972 ===
1972 Florida East Coast League

Team standings	W	L	PCT	GB	Managers
Melbourne Reds	44	15	.746	--	Dave Pavlesic
Melbourne Twins	35	22	.614	8	Fred Waters
Cocoa Astros	26	30	.464	16½	Leo Posada
Cocoa Expos	9	47	.161	33½	Pat Daugherty

Total league attendance, 966
No playoffs held.

Player statistics
Player	Team	Stat	Tot	Player	Team	Stat	Tot
Dave Edwards	Twins	BA	.313	Kevin Cooney	Twins	W	8
Randy Bass	Twins	Runs	47	Paul Howlend	Reds	W	8
Dave Covert	Reds	Hits	62	Gary Myers	Reds	SO	58
Randy Bass	Twins	RBI	41	Forrest Clemmons	Reds	ERA	1.86
Randy Bass	Twins	HR	10				
