= Melbourne Reds (U.S. baseball) =

- 1972; Melbourne, Florida

Minor league affiliations
- Previous classes: Rookie Level
- League: Florida East Coast League

Minor league titles
- League titles: 1 (1972)

The Melbourne Reds were a short-lived minor league baseball team based in Melbourne, Florida. The club played in the rookie level Florida East Coast League in 1972. That season the team won the league title before folding with the league at the end of the season.
