= Cookie Rojas =

Cuban baseball player and manager (born 1939)

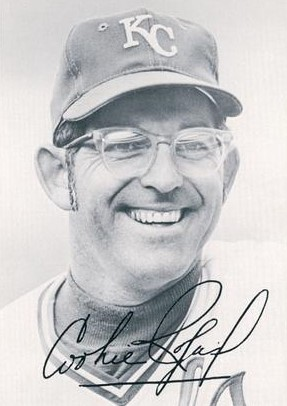
- Rojas with the Kansas City Royals in 1974
- Second baseman / Manager
- Born: March 6, 1939 (age 87); Havana, Cuba
- Batted: Right Threw: Right

MLB debut
- April 10, 1962, for the Cincinnati Reds

Last MLB appearance
- October 1, 1977, for the Kansas City Royals

MLB statistics
- Batting average: .263
- Home runs: 54
- Runs batted in: 593
- Managerial record: 76–79
- Winning %: .490
- Stats at Baseball Reference
- Managerial record at Baseball Reference

Teams
- As player: Cincinnati Reds (1962); Philadelphia Phillies (1963–1969); St. Louis Cardinals (1970); Kansas City Royals (1970–1977); As manager: California Angels (1988); Florida Marlins (1996); As coach: Chicago Cubs (1978–1981); Florida Marlins (1993–1996); New York Mets (1997–2000); Toronto Blue Jays (2001–2002)

Career highlights and awards
- 5× All-Star (1965, 1971–1974); Kansas City Royals Hall of Fame

Octavio Víctor "Cookie" Rojas Rivas (born March 6, 1939), is a Cuban-American former professional baseball player, coach, manager and current television sports presenter. He played in Major League Baseball as a second baseman and outfielder from 1962 to 1977, most prominently for the Philadelphia Phillies where he first became an All-Star player, and later with the Kansas City Royals where his veteran experience and leadership played an integral role in helping the young Royals franchise develop into a championship team.

Although Rojas began his career as a second baseman, he was an extremely versatile athlete who could play any defensive position. He was named to four consecutive American League (AL) All-Star teams (1971-74) during his tenure with Kansas City and led the AL in fielding percentage in 1971, including a 52-game errorless streak as a second baseman.

After his playing career, Rojas worked as a coach for the Chicago Cubs and the California Angels before he became the manager of the Angels in 1988. He later worked as a coach for the Florida Marlins, New York Mets and the Toronto Blue Jays, participating in his first World Series with the Mets in 2000.

In 2003, Rojas began working for the Miami Marlins on their Spanish-language telecasts as a color commentator. In 1987, he was inducted into the Kansas City Royals Hall of Fame, and he was inducted into the Hispanic Heritage Baseball Museum Hall of Fame in 2011.

== Early life and minor leagues ==
Playing baseball over the objections of his father, who wanted him to be a doctor, Rojas signed his first professional baseball contract with the Cincinnati Reds as a 17-year-old amateur free agent prior to the start of the 1956 season. Rojas was then assigned to Cincinnati's D-level team, the West Palm Beach Sun Chiefs in the Florida State League.

From 1957 to 1959, Rojas would make steady progress through the Reds' minor league system, playing for the Wausau Lumberjacks in the C-level Northern League in 1957, the Savannah Redlegs in the Single A Sally League in 1958, before coming home and playing for the Havana Sugar Kings in the AAA International League. His advancement through the system was steady despite his batting average falling every year between 1956 and 1960, finally bottoming out at .225.

Although he possessed an above-average glove, the Reds were not sure he'd ever hit enough to play regularly in the majors. Consequently, he would spend the next three seasons at AAA, playing for Havana and the Jersey City Jerseys, where he would continue to struggle with his bat while being blocked in the majors by superior Reds' second basemen in All Stars Johnny Temple, Billy Martin, and Don Blasingame. Rojas would finally go north with the Reds at the beginning of the 1962 season and would make his major league debut on April 10. However, he would continue to show little at the plate, hitting .221 with only 2 extra base hits in 78 at bats, and would be sent down to the AAA Dallas-Fort Worth Spurs for the remainder of the season.

== Major league career ==
After the 1962 season, Rojas was traded to the Philadelphia Phillies for relief pitcher Jim Owens. Although the Phillies already had an All-Star second baseman in fellow Cuban Tony Taylor, Rojas had seen the last of the minor leagues and would man second in 27 games in 1963. Although he became the regular Phillies second baseman in 1965, Rojas would go on to play at every fielding position, including catcher and pitcher, but would see the bulk of his playing time in the outfield and shortstop in addition to second base. Getting more playing time helped improve his batting, as Rojas hit .291 in 1964 and a career-high .303 in 1965, when he was named to his first All-Star team. With the Phillies, Rojas teamed with shortstop Bobby Wine in a stellar double-play combination media and fans began to refer as "The Plays of Wine and Rojas", a takeoff of the popular song, "The Days of Wine and Roses".

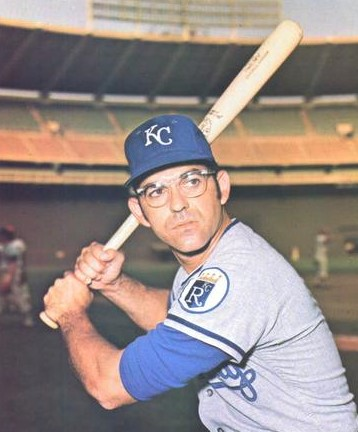
Rojas with the Kansas City Royals

Following the 1969 season in which Rojas hit only .228 and hot prospect Denny Doyle tore through AAA with a .310 average, the Phillies decided to include him in a blockbuster trade sending slugging first baseman Dick Allen and right-handed pitcher Jerry Johnson to the St. Louis Cardinals for centerfielder Curt Flood, catcher Tim McCarver, outfielder Byron Browne, and left-handed pitcher Joe Hoerner, the trade that led ultimately to Major League baseball free agency.

By the time the Phillies traded Rojas to the Cardinals in 1970, it appeared his career might be over, as he was hitting only .106 going into the June trading deadline. St. Louis in turn traded him to the Kansas City Royals for outfielder/third baseman Fred Rico on June 13. Kansas City, a team in only its second year of existence, wanted a veteran presence to steady its infield, and in return for the career–minor leaguer Rico, the Royals gained a player who would man second base for most of the next eight seasons and appear in four consecutive All-Star games from 1971 to 1974.

In April 1970, at least one news report mistakenly said Rojas was critically injured in an auto accident. In fact it was former major leaguer Minnie Rojas. In the 1972 All-Star Game in Atlanta, he hit a pinch-hit, two-run homer in the eighth inning, which was the first time that a non-American-born player had ever homered for the American League in the mid-summer classic.

Though a fan favorite, Rojas lost his job as the Royals' starting second baseman to Frank White in 1976, who was much younger than the 37-year-old Rojas and both hit and fielded better than Rojas. Remaining with the team for two more years, Rojas filled a utility role with the team, playing at first, second and third base, and designated hitter. After being released by the team after the 1977 season, Rojas spent 1978 on the sidelines. Despite signing with the Chicago Cubs on September 1, he did not get into a game with the team and retired from baseball.

Rojas is currently in second place on the Royals all-time list of games played at second base with 789, second only to White.

== Career statistics ==
Years	Games	PA	AB	R	H	2B	3B	HR	RBI	BB	SO	AVG	OBP	SLG	FLD%
16	1,822	6,871	6,309	713	1,660	254	25	54	593	396	489	.263	.306	.337	.982

His main position was second base, recording a .984 fielding percentage in 1,445 games at that position. He has played all other infield (including catcher) and outfield positions as well.

== Coaching career ==
After his playing career, Rojas coached and scouted for various teams. From 1978 to 1981 he was a coach for the Chicago Cubs. In 1988, he became only the third Cuban-born manager in major-league history when he took the helm of the California Angels, whom he had guided to fourth place with a 75–79 record before being replaced with Moose Stubing with eight games left in the season (with the Angels losing all eight games). In 1996, Rojas managed one game for the Florida Marlins after manager Rene Lachemann was fired before John Boles finished the season for the Marlins.

During the 1999 playoffs, while coaching third base for the New York Mets, Rojas was suspended for five games for getting into a shoving match with umpire Charlie Williams while arguing a foul ball call. Rojas also served as the team's third base coach during the 2000 season, in which they appeared in the World Series. From 2001 to 2002 he was bench coach with the Toronto Blue Jays and was unofficial manager for 3 games in 2001.

For the 2002 season, Rojas was third base coach for the Toronto Blue Jays.

== Personal life ==
Rojas' second youngest son, Victor, was previously the lead play-by-play announcer for the Los Angeles Angels, and is now the general manager of the Frisco RoughRiders. His second-oldest son, Mike, is a minor league manager and former MLB bullpen coach for the Detroit Tigers and Seattle Mariners.

In 2011, he was inducted into the Hispanic Heritage Baseball Museum Hall of Fame.

Sporting positions
Preceded by Jack Bloomfield	Chicago Cubs first base coach 1978–1980	Succeeded by Gene Clines
Preceded by Joey Amalfitano	Chicago Cubs third base coach 1981	Succeeded by Gordon Mackenzie
Preceded by Franchise established	Florida Marlins third base coach 1993–1996	Succeeded by Rich Donnelly
Preceded by Mike Cubbage	New York Mets third base coach 1997–2000	Succeeded by John Stearns
Preceded by Lee Elia	Toronto Blue Jays bench coach 2001–2002	Succeeded by n/a
