= Cocoa Expos (minor league baseball) =

- 1972; Cocoa, Florida

Minor league affiliations
- Previous classes: Class Rookie League
- League: Florida East Coast League

The Cocoa Expos were a short-lived professional minor league baseball team based Cocoa, Florida in 1972. The club, which featured future hall of famer and 1986 World Series champion, Gary Carter, was a member of the rookie-level Florida East Coast League. During their only season in existence, the team posted a 9–47 record, which gave them fourth place in the league.

== Notable alumni ==
- Dennis Blair
- Gary Carter
- Ellis Valentine
- Michel Dion - pro hockey
