= Tallahassee Rebels =

- 1954; Tallahassee, Florida

Minor league affiliations
- Previous classes: Class B
- League: Florida International League

The Tallahassee Rebels were a short-lived professional minor league baseball team based Tallahassee, Florida in 1954. The club was a member of the Class B Florida International League. During their lone season, the Rebels posted a dismal 22-76, for last place in the six team league. It became defunct after its 1954 season along with the Florida International League.

== Notable alumni ==
- Don Plarski
- Jose Zardon
