= Danny Morejón =

Cuban baseball player (1930-2009)

- Outfielder
- Born: July 21, 1930; Havana, Cuba
- Died: April 27, 2009 (aged 78); Miami, Florida, U.S.
- Batted: Right Threw: Right

MLB debut
- July 11, 1958, for the Cincinnati Redlegs

Last MLB appearance
- August 3, 1958, for the Cincinnati Redlegs

MLB statistics
- Batting average: .192
- Home runs: 0
- Runs batted in: 1
- Stats at Baseball Reference

Teams
- Cincinnati Redlegs (1958)

Daniel Morejón Torres (Spanish pronunciation: [moɾeˈxon]; July 21, 1930 – April 27, 2009) was a Cuban-born professional baseball player. He was a backup outfielder in Major League Baseball who played briefly for the Cincinnati Reds during July and early August of the 1958 season. Listed at 6 ft 1 in (185 cm), 175 lb (79 kg), Morejón batted and threw right-handed. He was born in Havana.

In his brief Major League career, Morejón was a .192 hitter (5-for-26) in 12 games, including four runs, one RBI, one stolen base, and a .400 on-base percentage. He did not have an extra base hit.

Morejón played in minor league baseball for 19 seasons (1954–1972) including the Havana Sugar Kings of the International League. In 1955, he was named Most Valuable Player of the Carolina League while playing for the High Point-Thomasville Hi-Toms. After his playing career, he managed and maintained the baseball fields at Tropical Park in Miami, Florida. He died in Miami at the age of 78.

== See also ==
- 1958 Cincinnati Redlegs season
- List of Major League Baseball players from Cuba
