= Tony Pacheco =

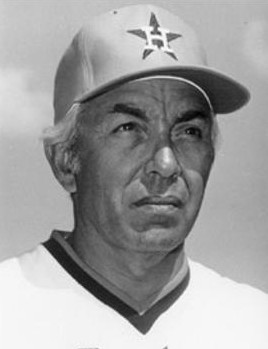
- Pacheco in 1976
- Coach
- Born: August 9, 1927; Havana, Cuba
- Died: March 23, 1987 (aged 59); Miami Beach, Florida, U.S.
- Batted: Right Threw: Right
- Stats at Baseball Reference

Teams
- As coach: Cleveland Indians (1974); Houston Astros (1976–1979, 1982)
Medals
Men's baseball
Manager for Colombia
Amateur World Series
Gold medal – first place	1965 Cartagena	Team

Antonio Aristides Pacheco (August 9, 1927 – March 23, 1987) was a Cuban-born coach and scout in Major League Baseball. A longtime minor league infielder and manager, Pacheco coached in MLB for six seasons (1974; 1976–79; 1982) for the Cleveland Indians and Houston Astros.

== Biography ==
Born in Punta Brava (now Havana), Pacheco got his start in American professional baseball in 1949 with the Class D Newport Canners of the Appalachian League, but by 1951 he was a regular second baseman for the Havana Cubanos of the Class B Florida International League, one of the most successful minor league clubs of its day (and provider of a stream of Cuban talent to its parent team, the Washington Senators). Pacheco's playing career would take him back to the United States' mainland after 1953, but he would return to Cuba's capital twice to play (1954), then manage (1958) for the Triple-A Havana Sugar Kings of the International League. As a player, Pacheco batted .236 with 14 home runs in 2,825 at bats over eight seasons. He threw and batted right-handed, stood 6 ft (1.8 m) tall and weighed 185 lb (84 kg).

Pacheco managed in the Cincinnati Reds' farm system in 1958–59 (the Sugar Kings were a Reds' affiliate at that time), scouted for the Reds, then in 1961 became a scout for the expansion Houston Colt .45s (renamed the Astros after 1964). In 1966–73, he resumed his minor league managing career, reaching Triple-A Oklahoma City of the American Association in 1972. He also managed in winter baseball and served as a part-time Houston scout; in October 1967, Pacheco and scouting director Pat Gillick signed César Cedeño to his first professional contract.

In 1973, former Cincinnati farm system director Phil Seghi, now general manager of the Indians, hired Pacheco as manager of the Tribe's Double-A San Antonio Missions farm club, then brought him to Cleveland as a coach on Ken Aspromonte's staff in 1974. Pacheco was not retained when Frank Robinson replaced Aspromonte for 1975 but instead managed the Rookie-level Gulf Coast Indians that season.

But in 1976, Pacheco was appointed a coach with the Astros by their new manager, Bill Virdon, and he would serve through 1979 as the team's first-base coach. He also coached for Houston in 1982 and scouted for them during the early 1980s.

Pacheco died at age 59 in Miami Beach, Florida.
