= Hollywood Chiefs =

- 1940; Hollywood, Florida

Minor league affiliations
- Previous classes: Class D
- League: Florida East Coast League

The Hollywood Chiefs were a professional minor league baseball team based in Fort Pierce, Florida in 1940. The clubs played in the Class-D Florida East Coast League. The team last only one season and the league later shut its doors, along with many other minor leagues, a few months after the United States entered World War II, and, despite the postwar baseball boom, they were not revived.
