= Southern Elite Hockey League =

The Southern Elite Hockey League (SEHL) was an independent Jr. A ice hockey league based in Florida and Alabama.

== League History ==
In the league's inaugural season, 1998–1999, the SEHL played with 6 teams all but two in Florida: the Alabama Gunners (Pelham, Alabama), the Chicago Force (Chicago, Illinois), the Daytona Riptide (Daytona Beach, Florida), the Jacksonville Hammerheads (Jacksonville, Florida), the Kissimmee Fury (Kissimmee, Florida), and the Space Coast Blast (Cape Canaveral, Florida). The Gunners were clearly the toast of the league going on a 13-game unbeaten streak but folded after 24 games. Because the Gunners were unable to finish the season, the door was left open for the Space Coast Blast to win the league championship.

The next season, 1999–2000, The Kissimmee Fury renamed themselves the Orlando Fury and the SEHL added the Pelham Prowlers (Pelham, Alabama) and the Tampa Bay Ice Pirates (Tampa, Florida). Again, the sole Alabama team dominated the season. The Prowlers went an outstanding 34-5-1 during the regular season and swept the Orlando Fury in two games and the Space Coast Blast in three games to take the SEHL championship from the previous champion.

The league suspended operations during the 2000-2001 season and had every intention of returning with at least 9 teams in 2001-2002, but those plans never materialized and the league folded.

== Champions ==
| Season | Team | Record |
| 98-99 | Space Coast Blast | 37-3 |
| 99-00 | Pelham Prowlers | 34-5-1 |

== Alumni in the Pros ==
=== Chicago Force ===
- Sean Flynn (UHL)
- Anthony Di Iulio USHL

=== Daytona Riptide ===
- Makoonse "Koona" Briggs (UHL)

=== Jacksonville Hammerheads ===
- Kevin Carr (CHL, South East HL, ECHL)
- Sean Honeysett (UHL)

=== Kissimmee/Orlando Fury ===
- Chris Affinati (CHL, UHL, WHA2, SPHL)
- Jessy Berube (ACHL, WHA2, LNAH)
- Chris Morseth (CHL, WCHL, UHL)
- Rob Sanders (NCAA Hockey East

=== Pelham Prowlers ===
- Darrell Baumken (SPHL)
- Jim Black (ECHL, WHA2)
- Noel Burkitt (EPIHL, BNL, EIHL)
- Tanner Harpwood (WPHL, ECHL, NEHL)
- Steve Howard (CHL, ACHL, WHA2, South East HL, SPHL, ECHL)
- Daniel Kletke (UHL, ECHL, WPHL, South East HL)

=== Space Coast Blast ===
- Janne Ahmavuo (UHL)
- CJ Carlson(ECHL)
- Rocky Florio (WPHL, CHL, UHL)
- Eddie Garrison (MLRH, RHI, CHL, NFHL)
- Jamie Sargent (ECHL, IHL, DEL, SPHL)
- Scott Ross WPHL, CHL
- Joey Spencer (UHL, ECHL, CIS, SPHL, Danish Elite League)
- Shane Magnus (Captain) (CHL, SJHL)
- Rory MacLeod (KIJHL)
