= DeLand Red Hats =

- 1936–1954; (1936–1942, 1946–1954); DeLand, Florida

Minor league affiliations
- Previous classes: Class D
- League: Florida State League (1946–1954)
- Previous leagues: Florida East Coast League (1942); Florida State League (1936–1941)

Major league affiliations
- Previous teams: Washington Senators (1940); Chicago White Sox (1938); Cincinnati Reds (1936–1937)

Minor league titles
- League titles: 2 (1950, 1951)

Team data
- Previous names: DeLand Red Hats (1939–1954); DeLand Reds (1936–1938)
- Previous parks: Conrad Park

The DeLand Red Hats were a minor-league baseball team in DeLand, Florida that played in the Florida State League (FSL) from 1936–1954. They played in Conrad Park, near Stetson University.

== Early years ==
After the FSL was re-organized in 1936 the Red Hats were called simply the DeLand Reds and were affiliated with the Cincinnati Reds as a Class D team. In 1938 they moved into the Chicago White Sox organization. In 1939 they were renamed the Red Hats and featured many players who were to be Washington Senators, such as starting pitcher Mickey Haefner. As a result, the Senators made DeLand part of its minor-league organization in 1940. The club was again unaffiliated the next season and for the duration of World War II, becoming part of the Florida East Coast League after the FSL ceased operations early in the 1942 season. The major-league St. Louis Browns used Conrad Park that year for spring training but were not affiliated with the club otherwise. In fact the Red Hats would not be affiliated with any major-league organization again, even after returning to the rebooted FSL in 1946.

== 1950s Champions ==
The biggest Red Hats star may have been Al Pirtle, a career minor-leaguer and FSL star whom they acquired in 1950. Pirtle never made the majors but his presence heralded a four-year run of success for the club. The team in 1950 posted a record of 82-57 while Pirtle batted .345 and had 38 doubles. After several playoff disappointments they finally won their first FSL championship that year. They came back in 1951 even stronger, winning 90 games and a second FSL title. Now clearly the best team in the league, 1952 was their best year statistically, with a 95-40 (.703) record. However they lost the first playoff round and would not three-peat. In 1953 they won a modest 78 games but made it back to the FSL championship series again. They would not win a third title, losing to the Daytona Beach Islanders.

1954 would prove to be the final season for the Red Hats. Attendance was down all across the FSL, a trend attributed to television, and the DeLand club was relocated to Gainesville.

== The Ballpark ==
DeLand's teams played at Conrad Park. The ballpark was also home of several other clubs, notably: the Sun Caps and the Suns, the Stetson University Hatters, and the Daytona Cubs. The original Conrad Park was demolished in 1998 and the site today is home to Melching Field at Conrad Park.

== Notable alumni ==
- Mickey Haefner (1939)
- Harry Rice (1938-1939)
- Bama Rowell (1954)

== Year by year results ==
Season	Name	Record	Notes
1936	Reds	60-80	First season of "new" FSL; became Cincinnati Reds minor-league affiliate
1937	Reds	79-61	Made playoffs, lost first round
1938	Reds	54-86	White Sox minor-league affiliate for one season
1939	Red Hats	69-69	Independent team ("co-op"); made playoffs, lost first round
1940	Red Hats	???	Washington Senators minor-league affiliate for one season
1941	Red Hats	78-47	Made playoffs, lost in second round (championship) to Leesburg Anglers
1942	Red Hats	13-13	FSL suspended operations in May, due to World War II
1943	Red Hats	???	Joined Florida East Coast League for duration of war
1944	Red Hats	???	
1945	Red Hats	???	
1946	Red Hats	68-68	Resumption of FSL; made playoffs, lost first round
1947	Red Hats	80-58	Made playoffs, lost first round
1948	Red Hats	50-90	
1949	Red Hats	64-70	
1950	Red Hats	82-57	FSL champions
1951	Red Hats	90-50	FSL champions
1952	Red Hats	95-40	Made playoffs, lost first round
1953	Red Hats	78-56	Made playoffs, lost in championship to Daytona Beach Islanders
1954	Red Hats	77-62	Team moves to Gainesville after season
