= Jacksonville Beach Sea Birds =

- 1952–1954; Jacksonville Beach, Florida

Minor league affiliations
- Previous classes: Class D
- League: Florida State League

Major league affiliations
- Previous teams: Cleveland Indians (1954)

Team data
- Previous parks: Jacksonville Beach Baseball Stadium

The Jacksonville Beach Sea Birds were a short-lived minor league baseball team, located in Jacksonville Beach, Florida from 1952 until 1954. It was a member of the then-Class D Florida State League.

== History ==
The businessmen who owned the team hoped that professional baseball would add a source of entertainment for residents and tourists. Many residents loved the game and a few men could also fulfill their dream of becoming team owners. Minor league teams seemed ubiquitous in Florida, the rest of the United States, Mexico and the Caribbean. The team was owned by the Greater Beaches Stadium, Inc. and their home ball park, known as Municipal Stadium, was on South Penman south of Shetter Avenue, a little over a mile from the ocean. Although the focus was Jacksonville Beach, people in other contiguous communities, such as Ponte Vedra Beach, Neptune Beach, Atlantic Beach, and Mayport, also rooted for the team. The owners hired Red Treadway, a former New York Giants player, as the Sea Birds' manager.

The Sea Birds finished the 1952 season with an 80–56 record, finishing second in the league behind the Palatka Azaleas. In the playoffs, the team finished second. The Sea Birds had only drawn 23,210 people to their home games and they lost money. The team was then sold to Julian Jackson and T.F. Cowart, who invested $50,000 into the team. The team finished in fifth place in 1953. The team's attendance issues continued, attracting just 17,785 patrons for the season. The Jacksonville baseball dollar was lost to the Jacksonville Braves and their star, Hank Aaron. One solution to the attendance problem was to sign some black players. However, according to Hank Aaron, the Sea Birds tried to put black players on the team but the local Chamber of Commerce and the American Legion believed that patrons "would rather have an all-white team."

By November 1, 1953, team ownership demanded concessions from the city, including a rent-free stadium, utilities, $20,000 worth of advance ticket sales, and 500 season tickets at $40 each. On March 18, 1954, the City of Jacksonville Beach helped the club by leasing the stadium to them for one dollar; agreeing to maintain the field and fences; providing police protection; and providing an estimated 65,000 KWH of electricity at the very low rate of two cents per KWH. The city then was able to use the stadium when there were no scheduled games. The Cleveland Indians made the Sea Birds one of their farm teams but they changed the personnel of the team, bringing in Spurgeon Chandler to coach.

Russ Nixon, the future manager of the Cincinnati Reds and the Atlanta Braves, won the 1954 Florida State League batting title. His brother, Roy, also played on the team, batting .324, hitting four home runs, with 91 RBIs. Meanwhile, the Sea Birds won the first half of the season but they finished with a 76–63 record (55%) and they lost in the league finals, finishing third in the league. The Sea Birds never solved their attendance problem. Ticket giveaways, performances and special events failed to create an audience sufficient to sustain the team. The Indians ended their affiliation with the franchise at the end of the season and the team formally folded.
