= Scott Cary =

American baseball player

- Pitcher
- Born: April 11, 1923; Kendallville, Indiana, U.S.
- Died: February 28, 2011 (aged 87); Coldwater, Michigan, U.S.
- Batted: Left Threw: Left

MLB debut
- May 1, 1947, for the Washington Senators

Last MLB appearance
- September 17, 1947, for the Washington Senators

MLB statistics
- Win–loss record: 3–1
- Earned run average: 5.93
- Strikeouts: 25
- Stats at Baseball Reference

Teams
- Washington Senators (1947)

Scott Russell Cary (April 11, 1923 – February 28, 2011), Nicknamed "Red", was an American Major League Baseball pitcher who played for the Washington Senators in 1947. He went 3–1 with a 5.93 earned run average in 23 games as a pitcher, starting 3 games.

== Personal ==
Cary was one of 10 children born to John and Ruby (Riehm) Cary. He was the ace for City Light in 1943, a semipro baseball team in Fort Wayne that also included future Major League Baseball pitchers Harley Hisner and Ned Garver.

On January 19, 1946, he married Mary Hurley in Sturgis; they raised six children on a farm in East Gilead.

Cary was inducted into the Fort Wayne Baseball Hall of Fame in 1977. He was a baseball coach for the Bronson Little League and the Babe Ruth Baseball programs.

Cary died on February 28, 2011, at the age of 87. He was buried in the St. Mary's Cemetery in Bronson.
