= Bama Rowell =

American baseball player (1916-1993)

- Second baseman / Outfielder
- Born: January 13, 1916; Citronelle, Alabama, U.S.
- Died: August 16, 1993 (aged 77); Citronelle, Alabama, U.S.
- Batted: Left Threw: Right

MLB debut
- September 4, 1939, for the Boston Bees

Last MLB appearance
- October 2, 1948, for the Philadelphia Phillies

MLB statistics
- Batting average: .275
- Home runs: 19
- Runs batted in: 217
- Stats at Baseball Reference

Teams
- Boston Bees/Braves (1939–1941, 1946–1947); Philadelphia Phillies (1948)

Carvel William "Bama" Rowell (January 13, 1916 – August 16, 1993) was an American professional baseball player. In Major League Baseball, he was a second baseman and outfielder for the Boston Bees/Braves (1939–41 and 1946–47) and Philadelphia Phillies (1948). Rowell was a native and lifelong resident of Citronelle, Alabama. He batted left-handed, threw right-handed, stood 5 feet 11 inches (1.80 m) tall and weighed 185 pounds (84 kg).

He finished 21st in voting for the 1940 National League Most Valuable Player for playing in 130 games and having 486 at bats, 46 runs scored, 148 hits, 19 doubles, eight triples, three home runs, 58 runs batted in, 12 stolen bases, 18 walks, .305 batting average, .331 on-base percentage, .395 slugging percentage, 192 total bases and three sacrifice hits.

In six MLB seasons Rowell played in 574 games and had 1,901 at bats, 200 runs scored, 523 hits, 95 doubles, 26 triples, 19 home runs, 217 runs batted in, 37 stolen bases, 113 walks, a .275 batting average, a .316 on-base percentage, and a .382 slugging percentage, with 727 total bases and 27 sacrifice hits.

On May 30, 1946 at 4:25 P.M., Rowell hit a home run which broke the Bulova clock on the Ebbets Field scoreboard, shattering the clock's glass. The clock stopped exactly one hour later. Although Bulova promised a free watch to anyone who hit the clock, Rowell didn't receive his watch until 41 years later, on Bama Rowell day in Citronelle.

On March 6, 1948, Rowell was involved in a key trade for the Braves. He was swapped to the Brooklyn Dodgers with first baseman Ray Sanders and $40,000 for second baseman Eddie Stanky. Although Rowell spent only eleven days with Brooklyn before being sold to the Phillies on March 17, Stanky helped lead Boston to its first National League pennant since 1914.
