= Fort Pierce Bombers =

- 1940–1942; Fort Pierce, Florida

Minor league affiliations
- Previous classes: Class D
- League: Florida East Coast League

The Fort Pierce Bombers were a professional minor league baseball team based in Fort Pierce, Florida from 1940 until 1942. The club played in the Class-D Florida East Coast League. The league and the team both shut their doors, along with many other minor leagues, a few months after the United States entered World War II, and, despite the postwar baseball boom, they were not revived.
