= Miami Beach Flamingos =

- 1940–1954; (1940–1942, 1946–1952, 1954); Miami Beach, Florida

Minor league affiliations
- Previous classes: Class-B (1949–1951, 1952, 1954); Class-C (1946–1948); Class-D (1940–1942)
- League: Florida International League (1946–1952, 1954)
- Previous leagues: Florida East Coast League (1940–1942)

Major league affiliations
- Previous teams: Boston Braves (1946)

Minor league titles
- League titles: 1 (1941)

Team data
- Previous names: Miami Beach Flamingos/Greater Miami Flamingos (1954); Miami Beach Flamingos (1941–1952); Miami Beach Tigers (1940)
- Previous parks: Flamingo Field

The Miami Beach Flamingos were a professional minor league baseball team based in Miami Beach, Florida periodically from 1940 until 1954.

The team played its home games at Flamingo Field and was a member of the Class D Florida East Coast League as the Miami Beach Tigers in 1940. The following season they changed their nickname to the Flamingos and won the league's championship. The FECL the then folded in May 1942 due to World War II. After the War, the Flamingos joined the new Class C Florida International League in 1946. The league became Class-B in 1949. The Flamingos played the 1952 season, sat out 1953, and rejoined in 1954 only to move across Biscayne Bay and relocate to Miami as the Miami Beach Flamingos/Greater Miami Flamingos during the 1954 season.

== Notable alumni ==
- Gene Bearden
- Jack Brittin
- Harry Chozen
- Jim Clark
- Bill Currie
- Hooks Iott
- Jesse Levan
- Minnie Mendoza
- Danny Morejon
- Baby Ortiz
- Jimmy Outlaw
- Jack Phillips
- Whitey Platt
- Max Rosenfeld
- Mike Schemer
