= West Palm Beach Indians =

- 1940–1956; (1940–1942, 1946–1956); West Palm Beach, Florida

Minor league affiliations
- Previous classes: Class D (1955–1956); Class B (1949–1954); Class C (1946–1948); Class D (1940–1942)
- League: Florida State League (1955–1956)
- Previous leagues: Florida International League (1946–1954); Florida East Coast League (1940–1942)

Major league affiliations
- Previous teams: Cincinnati Redlegs (1956); Milwaukee Braves (1955); Philadelphia Athletics (1950)

Minor league titles
- Conference titles: 1 1941

Team data
- Previous names: West Palm Beach Sun Chiefs (1956); West Palm Beach Indians (1940–1955)
- Previous parks: Connie Mack Field

The West Palm Beach Indians were a minor league baseball team based in West Palm Beach, Florida. The team played its home games at Connie Mack Field.

== History ==
Through its existence, the Indians were mostly an independent team playing in the Florida East Coast League from 1940 to 1942, the Florida International League from 1946 to 1954, and the Florida State League in 1955. In between, they were affiliated with the Philadelphia Athletics in 1950, Havana Sugar Kings in 1954, and Milwaukee Braves in 1955.

In 1956, the franchise name was changed to the West Palm Beach Sun Chiefs an affiliate of the Cincinnati Redlegs. Managed by Walt Novick, the 1965 team posted an 81–58 record to finish in third place, 8 1/2 games out of the first place spot. The team included on its roster future big leaguers such as Dave Bristol, Duane Richards and Cookie Rojas. The franchise did not return for the 1957 season.

West Palm Beach was then without a professional team until 1965, when the West Palm Beach Braves joined the Florida State League as an affiliate of the Milwaukee Braves.

== The ballpark ==
West Palm Beach teams played home minor league games at Connie Mack Field. The ballpark was located at the intersection of Tamarind Avenue and Okeechobee Boulevard. It was demolished in 1992 and a parking garage for the Raymond F. Kravis Center for the Performing Arts occupies the site today.

== Notable alumni ==
- Dave Bristol (1956)
- Lou Finney (1949) MLB All-Star
- Claude Raymond (1955) MLB All-Star
- Cookie Rojas (1956) 5 x MLB All-Star

== Year–by–year records ==
Year	Record	Finish	Manager	Playoffs/notes
1940	52–60	4th	Cecil Downs / Joe Murff	Lost in first round
1941	84–55	1st	Harry Hughes	Lost league finals
1942	9–18	6th	Al Reitz	League disbanded May 14
1946	58–64	4th	Herb Thomas (6-21) / Shaw Buck (14-11) / Harry Hughes (38-32)	Lost league finals
1947	68–86	6th	Harry Hughes	Did not qualify
1948	70–83	6th	Rudy Laskowski / Michael Schemer	Did not qualify
1949	74–78	5th	Lou Finney	Did not qualify
1950	67–85	6th	Clyde Smoll / Rudy Laskowski	Did not qualify
1951	64–75	7th	Rudy Laskowski / Herschel Held	Did not qualify
1952	68–85	6th	Billy Holm / Bubba Harris	Did not qualify
1953	57–80	5th	Whitey Platt / Bubba Harris	Did not qualify
1954	47–51	3rd	Gil Torres	League disbanded July 27
1955	71–68	5th	Bill Steinecke	No playoffs held
