= Gainesville G-Men =

- 1936–1958; (1936–1941, 1946–1952, 1955–1958); Gainesville, Florida

Minor league affiliations
- Class: Class D
- League: Florida State League

Major league affiliations
- Team: Washington Senators (1958); St. Louis Cardinals (1956); Cleveland Indians (1938)

Minor league titles
- League titles (3): 1937; 1938; 1947

Team data
- Name: Gainesville G-Men
- Ballpark: Harris Field

Gainesville G-Men were a professional minor league baseball team, based in Gainesville, Florida, that played in the then Class D Florida State League. The team won league championships in 1937, 1938 and 1947.

The club folded on June 1, 1952, due to funding issues.

== Notable players ==
- Jim Rivera (1921–2017), Major League Baseball player
