= Cocoa Beach Fliers =

Cocoa Fliers
- 1941–1942; Cocoa, Florida

Minor league affiliations
- Previous classes: Class D
- League: Florida East Coast League

The Cocoa Fliers were a professional minor league baseball team based in Fort Pierce, Florida from 1941 until 1942. The clubs played in the Class-D Florida East Coast League. The team and the league both shut their doors, along with many other minor leagues, a few months after the United States entered World War II, and, despite the postwar baseball boom, they were not revived.
