= Palatka Redlegs =

- 1956–1962; Palatka, Florida

Minor league affiliations
- Class: Class D
- League: Florida State League

Major league affiliations
- Team: Chicago Cubs (1962); Milwaukee Braves (1961); Cincinnati Redlegs (1957–1960); Detroit Tigers (1956)

Minor league titles
- League titles (1): 1930

Team data
- Name: Palatka Cubs (1962); Palatka Redlegs (1957–1961); Palatka Tigers (1956)
- Ballpark: Azalea Bowl

The Palatka Redlegs were a minor league baseball team that existed from 1956 to 1962 as members of the Florida State League, as descendants from the Palatka Azaleas.

The team began as an affiliate of the Detroit Tigers in 1956, as the Palatka Tigers. From 1957 to 1960, the franchise was affiliated with the Cincinnati Reds. In 1961 they were affiliated with the Milwaukee Braves.

The Redlegs enjoyed a fairly successful run during their affiliation with the Reds, finishing no worse than third place over four seasons, including making the league finals in 1957 and winning the championship in 1960. However, as a Braves' affiliate, it would finish 61–78, which earned them sixth place in the 1961 FSL.

The franchise then affiliated with the Chicago Cubs as the Palatka Cubs before folding in 1962.

== The Ballpark ==
Palatka teams played at the Azalea Bowl in Forrester Field, which is listed on the National Register of Historic Places. The address is 1600 Twigg Street. The park, with the original grandstand demolished, is still in use today as home to the Palatka High School Panthers. Babe Ruth conducted clinics at the field in the late 1930s. "

== A False Spring: Novel ==
The 1961 team was memorialized in Pat Jordan's award-winning book "A False Spring." Jordan was a one-time phenom who never made it to the big leagues. He wrote of his minor league experiences in Palatka, such as the time a player sprinted in, grabbed a bat, clubbed a snake and threw it over the outfield fence.

== Notable alumni ==
- Dave Bristol (1960)
- Bill Connors (1962)
- Vic Davalillo (1958) MLB All-Star
- Tommy Helms (1959) 1966 NL Rookie of the Year
- Pat Jordan (1961)
- Mel Queen (1960)
- Johnny Vander Meer (1958, MGR) 4 x MLB All-Star
- Rube Walker (1962, MGR)
