= Fort Lauderdale Braves =

- 1947–1953; Fort Lauderdale, Florida

Minor league affiliations
- Previous classes: Class B (1949–1953); Class C (1947–1948)
- League: Florida International League

Major league affiliations
- Previous teams: Boston Braves (1947)

Minor league titles
- League titles: 1 (1953)

Team data
- Previous names: Fort Lauderdale Lions (1953); Key West Conchs (1952); Fort Lauderdale Braves (1947–1952)
- Previous parks: Westside Ballpark

The Fort Lauderdale Braves was a minor league baseball team in Fort Lauderdale, Florida from 1947 until 1953 that played its home games at Westside Ballpark at the north fork of the New River at Broward Boulevard. The team was a member of the Florida International League and were affiliated with the Boston Braves in 1947.

The team split its games in 1952 in Key West as the Key West Conchs. During their final season, the team was renamed the Fort Lauderdale Lions.

== Notable alumni ==
- Dick Donovan (1947) 5 x MLB All-Star; 1961 AL ERA Title
