= Fort Lauderdale Tarpons =

- 1928–1942; (1928, 1940-1942); Fort Lauderdale, Florida

Minor league affiliations
- Previous classes: Class A (1963-1968); Class D (1937-1962)
- League: Florida East Coast League (1940-1942)
- Previous leagues: Florida State League (1928)

Major league affiliations
- Previous teams: Pittsburgh Pirates (1940)

Minor league titles
- League titles: 1 (1940)

The Fort Lauderdale Tarpons were a minor league baseball team that played in the Florida State League in 1928 and in the Florida East Coast League from 1940 to 1942. They were located in Fort Lauderdale, Florida.

== Year-by-year record ==
Year	Record	Finish	Manager	Playoffs	Notes
1928	13–12	--	Tommy Leach	--	Team moved to St. Petersburg (25–11) May 24
1940	69–40	1st	Herb Thomas	League Champs	
1941	66–73	4th	Herb Thomas / Buster Kinard	Lost in 1st round	
1942	4–3	--	Herb Thomas		Team disbanded April 25
