= Miami Sun Sox =

- 1946–1954; (1946–1954); Miami, Florida

Minor league affiliations
- Previous classes: Class B (1949–1954); Class C (1946–1948)
- League: Florida International League (1946–1954)

Major league affiliations
- Previous teams: Brooklyn Dodgers (1949–1954)

Minor league titles
- League titles (2): 1950; 1952

Team data
- Previous names: Miami Sun Sox (1949–1954); Miami Tourists (1947–1948); Miami Sun Sox (1946)
- Previous parks: Miami Stadium (1949–1954); Miami Field (1946–1949)

The Miami Sun Sox (also known as the Miami Tourists) were a minor league baseball affiliate of the Brooklyn Dodgers between 1949 and 1954. They played in the Florida International League and were based in Miami, Florida, at Miami Stadium. The 1952 Sun Sox were recognized as one of the 100 greatest minor league teams of all time.
