= Palatka Azaleas =

- 1937–1953; (1936-1939, 1946-1953); Palatka, Florida

Minor league affiliations
- Previous classes: Class D
- League: Florida State League

Major league affiliations
- Previous teams: New York Yankees (1937); Detroit Tigers (1936)

Minor league titles
- League titles: 1 (1952)

Team data
- Previous parks: Azalea Bowl

The Palatka Azaleas were a minor league baseball team, based in Palatka, Florida, that existed from 1936 to 1939 and from 1946 to 1953. The Azaleas were members of the Florida State League. In 1936, they were affiliated with the Detroit Tigers, in 1937 they were affiliated with the New York Yankees, and in 1949 they were affiliated with the Tampa Smokers. In 1956, a Palatka team began play again and evolved into the Palatka Redlegs.

== The Ballpark ==
Palatka teams played at the Azalea Bowl in Forrester Field, which is listed on the National Register of Historic Places. The address is 1600 Twigg Street. The park, with the original grandstand demolished, is still in use today as home to the Palatka High School Panthers. Babe Ruth conducted clinics at the field in the late 1930s.

== Notable alumni ==
- Myril Hoag (1946) MLB All-Star
- Bernie Neis (1936)
- Bob Swift (1936-1937)
- Sam Zoldak (1938)

== Year-by-year records ==
Year	Record	Finish	Manager	Playoffs / Notes
1936	60-60	3rd	Jeff Emerson / Teen Gallegos	Lost in 1st round
1937	71-69	5th	Sam Agnew / Shaw Buck	Did not qualify
1938	63-76	6th	George Andrews / Herb Thomas	Did not qualify
1939	36-99	8th	Bill Leitz / Sam "Cowboy" Jones	Did not qualify
1946	62-75	6th	Myril Hoag	Did not qualify
1947	64-75	6th	John Toncoff	Did not qualify
1948	48-89	8th	Ray Ryan / John Toncoff; Charlie Bowles / Ben Geraghty (17-44)	Did not qualify
1949	76-62	4th	Julian Morgan / Bitsy Mott	Lost League Finals
1950	41-98	8th	Bitsy Mott / Robert Rucker	Did not qualify
1951	80-59	3rd	Bill Steinecke	Lost League Finals
1952	78-59	3rd	Bill Steinecke	League Champs
1953	13-22	--	Charles Baird	Did not qualify Palatka moved to Lakeland (34-67) May 15
