= Daytona Beach Islanders =

- 1920–1987; (1920–1924, 1928, 1936–1941, 1946–1973, 1977–1987); Daytona Beach, Florida

Minor league affiliations
- Previous classes: Class A (1963–1987); Class D (1928–1962); Class C (1921–1924); Class D (1920)
- League: Florida State League

Major league affiliations
- Previous teams: Chicago White Sox (1987); Texas Rangers (1986); Houston Astros (1978–1984); Kansas City Royals (1977); Los Angeles Dodgers (1968–1973); Detroit Tigers (1965–1966); Kansas City Athletics (1962–1964); Chicago White Sox (1961); St. Louis Cardinals (1957–1960); Cleveland Indians (1956); St. Louis Cardinals (1954); Cleveland Indians (1950–1953); Brooklyn Dodgers (1939, 1946); St. Louis Cardinals (1936–1938, 1940–1941)

Minor league titles
- League titles: 3 (1948, 1953, 1981)

Team data
- Previous names: Daytona Beach Admirals (1987); Daytona Beach Astros (1978–1984); Daytona Beach Islanders (1977, 1985–1986); Daytona Beach Dodgers (1968–1973); Daytona Beach Islanders (1946–1966); Daytona Beach Islanders (1928, 1936–1941); Clearwater Pelicans (1924); Daytona Beach Islanders (1920–1924)
- Previous parks: City Island Ballpark

Daytona Beach Islanders was a name for various minor league baseball teams that have all played in the Florida State League from 1920–1966 and in 1977 and again from 1985–1986. In 1968 through 1973, the team became the Daytona Beach Dodgers, due to their affiliation with the Los Angeles Dodgers. In 1977, the team once again took up the Islanders name before becoming the Daytona Beach Astros for the next seven seasons. Then, for the 1985 and 1986 seasons, they were, yet again, known as the Daytona Beach Islanders, playing as a co-op club of the Baltimore Orioles and Texas Rangers for the first of those years and as a full affiliate of the Rangers for the 1986 season. Finally the team became the Daytona Beach Admirals (and was a Chicago White Sox affiliate) in 1987, before being sold and becoming the St. Lucie Mets.

== History ==
=== Islanders ===
The first team known as the Daytona Islanders team was an independent team that played from 1920–1924. Partway through the 1924 season, they moved to Clearwater, Florida to become the Clearwater Pelicans. The second team was an affiliate of the St. Louis Cardinals (1936–1938, 1940–41) and Brooklyn Dodgers (1939). While the Islanders were an affiliate of the Cardinals, Stan Musial played for them under manager Dickey Kerr. The third team played from 1946–1966 as an affiliate of the Brooklyn Dodgers (1946), Cleveland Indians (1950–53, 55–56), St. Louis Cardinals (1954, 57–60), Chicago White Sox (1961), Kansas City A's (1962–64) and Detroit Tigers (1965–66).

=== Dodgers ===
In 1968, the team became the Daytona Beach Dodgers, Single-A affiliate of the Los Angeles Dodgers and continued to play their games in the Florida State League until 1973.

=== Astros ===
After a hiatus in 1977, the team was once again named the Islanders, before becoming the Daytona Beach Astros the following year, as an affiliate with the Houston Astros. After 1984, the Astros moved the team to Kissimmee, Florida and they became the Osceola Astros.

=== Admirals ===
A team known as the Admirals moved back into Daytona Beach and played for one season, before moving to St. Lucie and becoming the St. Lucie Mets.

== Notable alumni ==
=== Admirals ===
- John Barfield
- Tom Drees
- Wayne Edwards
- Buddy Groom
- Matt Merullo
- Bob Milacki
- Francisco Oliveras
- Allan Ramirez
- Billy Ripken
- Kenny Rogers
- Jeff Tackett

=== Astros ===
- Ricky Adams
- Rod Boxberger
- Eric Bullock
- Jeff Calhoun
- Jeff Datz
- Glenn Davis
- Bill Doran
- Danny Heep
- Pedro Hernández
- Chris Jones
- Mark Knudson
- Doug Phifer
- Doug Konieczny
- Jack Lazorko
- Scott Loucks
- Louie Meadows
- Ron Meridith
- John Mizerock
- Pat Perry
- Johnny Ray
- Larry Ray
- J. R. Richard
- Mark Ross
- Roger Samuels
- Brent Strom
- Tim Tolman
- Tony Walker
- Robbie Wine

=== Dodgers ===
- Doyle Alexander
- Iván DeJesús
- Joe Ferguson
- Davey Lopes
- Rick Rhoden
- Jerry Royster
- Bob Shaw
- Steve Yeager
- Geoff Zahn

=== Islanders ===
- Red Ames
- Bill Antonello
- Lou Bevil
- Roy Branch
- Steve Busby
- Bill Butler
- Les Cain
- Bert Campaneris
- Rocky Colavito
- Wayland Dean
- Bobby Dews
- Chuck Diering
- Blix Donnelly
- Dick Drago
- Dave Duncan
- Craig Eaton
- Danny Garcia
- Hank Gornicki
- Tom Harrison
- Kelly Heath
- Mike Jones
- Mike Kilkenny
- Marcel Lachemann
- Gene Lamont
- Tony LaRussa
- Allan Lewis
- Renie Martin
- Félix Millán
- Ed Olivares
- Ken Phelps
- Ellie Rodríguez
- Joe Rudi
- Ron Taylor
- Johnny Vander Meer
- Jon Warden

=== Pelicans ===
- Tommy McMillan
- Herb Thomas
