= List of Florida State League stadiums =

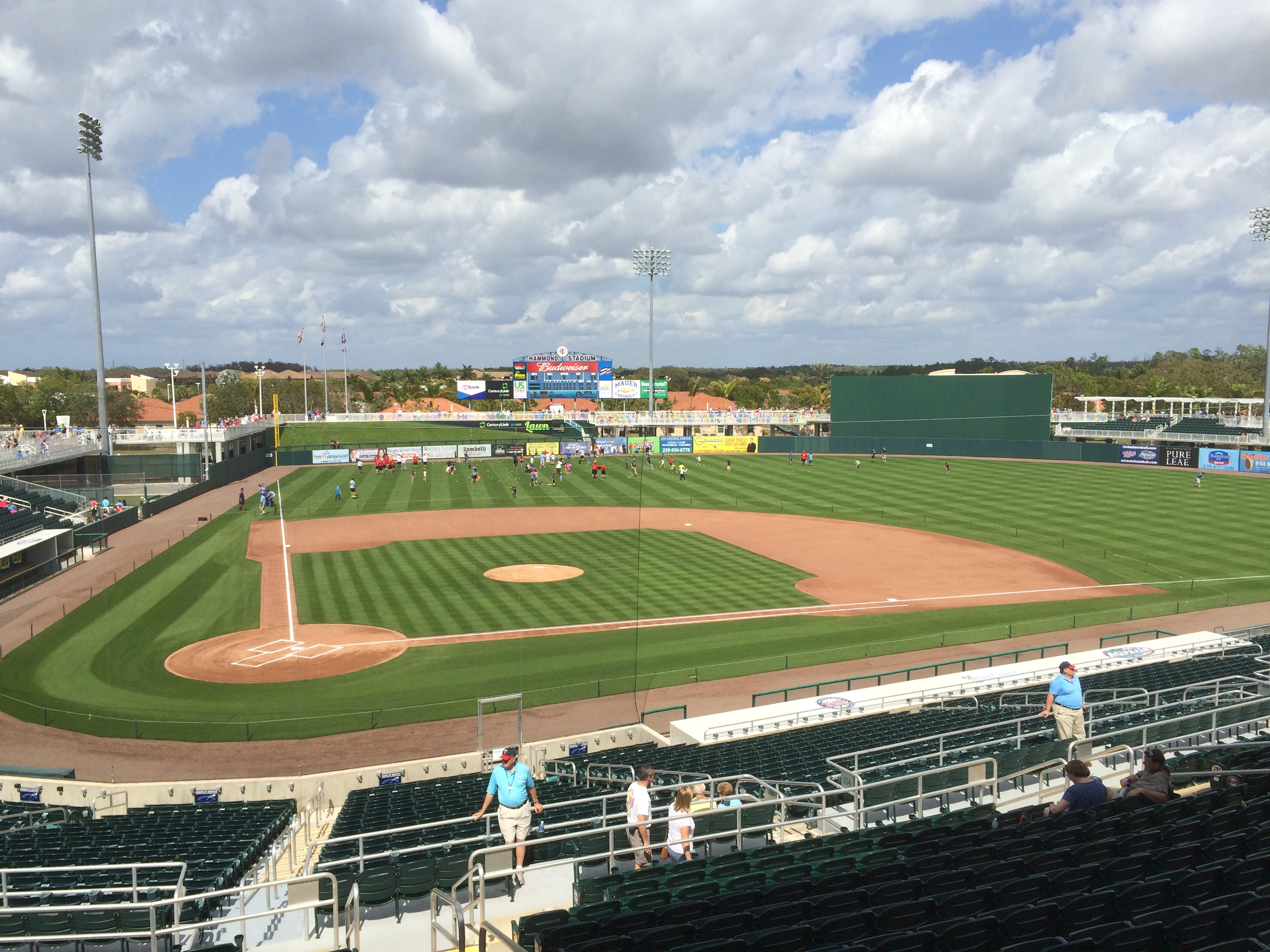
Hammond Stadium was built in 1991 and is home to the Fort Myers Mighty Mussels.

Jackie Robinson Ballpark, home of the Daytona Tortugas, opened in 1914 and is the oldest ballpark in use by MiLB.

There are nine stadiums in use by Florida State League (FSL) baseball teams, all located in Florida. The oldest stadium is Jackie Robinson Ballpark (1914) in Daytona Beach, home of the Daytona Tortugas. As of the 2026 season, it is also the oldest in use by any Minor League Baseball (MiLB) team. The newest stadium is BayCare Ballpark (2004) in Clearwater, home of the Clearwater Threshers. One stadium was built in each of the 1910s, 1920s, 1960s, and 1980s, four in the 1990s, and one in the 2000s. The highest seating capacity is 11,026 at George M. Steinbrenner Field in Tampa, where the Tampa Tarpons play. The lowest capacity is 4,200 at Jackie Robinson Ballpark.

Since its founding in 1919, there have been over 50 stadiums located among more than 30 municipalities used by the league. Of the stadiums with known opening dates, the oldest to have hosted FSL games was Plant Field (1899) in Tampa, former home of the Tampa Smokers. BayCare Ballpark is also the newest among all FSL stadiums. Miami Stadium in Miami, where the Miami Marlins, Orioles, and Miracle once played, had the highest known seating capacity of 13,500. The stadium with the lowest known capacity was Henley Field in Lakeland, former home of the Lakeland Pilots, Indians, Giants, and Tigers, which seated only 800.

== Active stadiums and map ==
Current stadium locations:
- East Division
- West Division

Name	Team	City in Florida	Opened	Capacity	Ref.
Jackie Robinson Ballpark	Daytona Tortugas	Daytona Beach	1914	4,200	
Roger Dean Chevrolet Stadium	Jupiter Hammerheads, Palm Beach Cardinals	Jupiter	1998	6,871	
Clover Park	St. Lucie Mets	Port St. Lucie	1988	7,160	
LECOM Park	Bradenton Marauders	Bradenton	1923	8,500	
BayCare Ballpark	Clearwater Threshers	Clearwater	2004	8,500	
TD Ballpark	Dunedin Blue Jays	Dunedin	1990	8,500	
Hammond Stadium	Fort Myers Mighty Mussels	Fort Myers	1991	9,300	
Publix Field at Joker Marchant Stadium	Lakeland Flying Tigers	Lakeland	1966	8,500	
George M. Steinbrenner Field	Tampa Tarpons	Tampa	1996	11,026	

=== Gallery ===
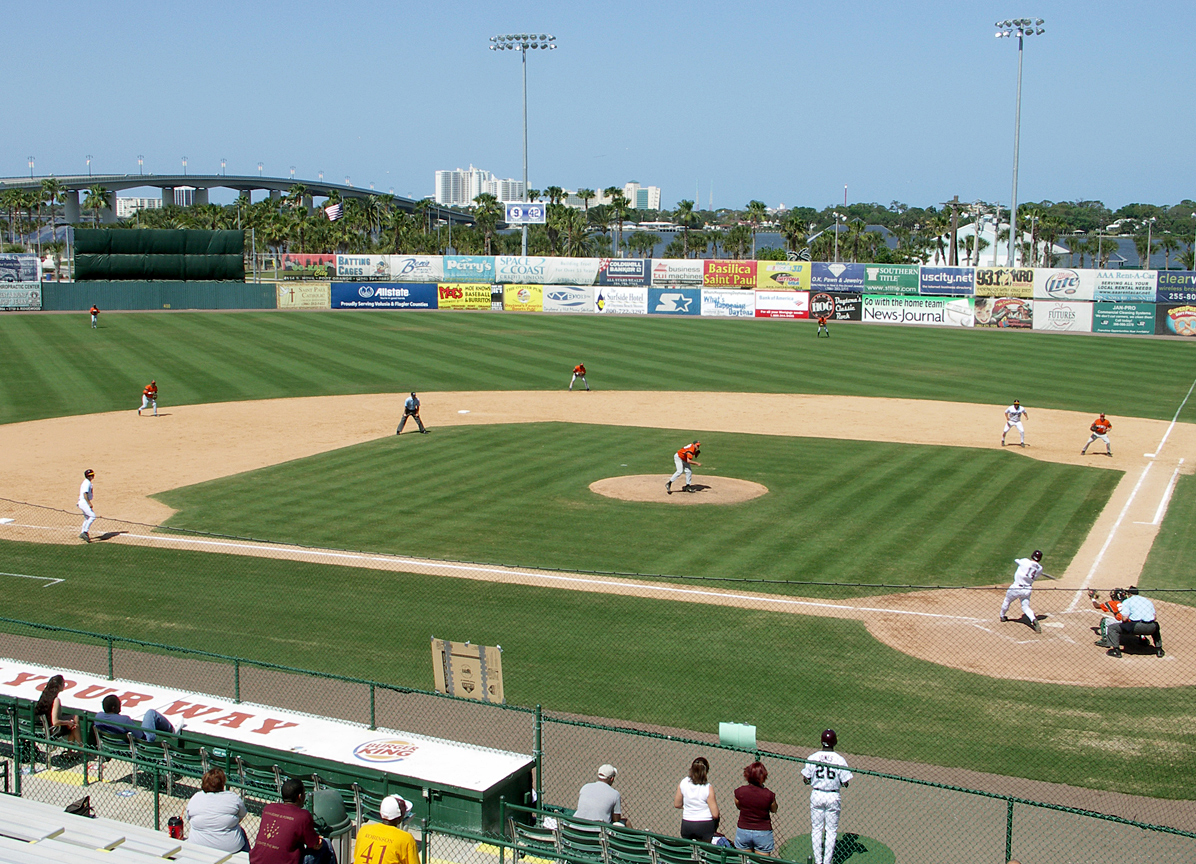
Jackie Robinson Ballpark (Daytona Tortugas)

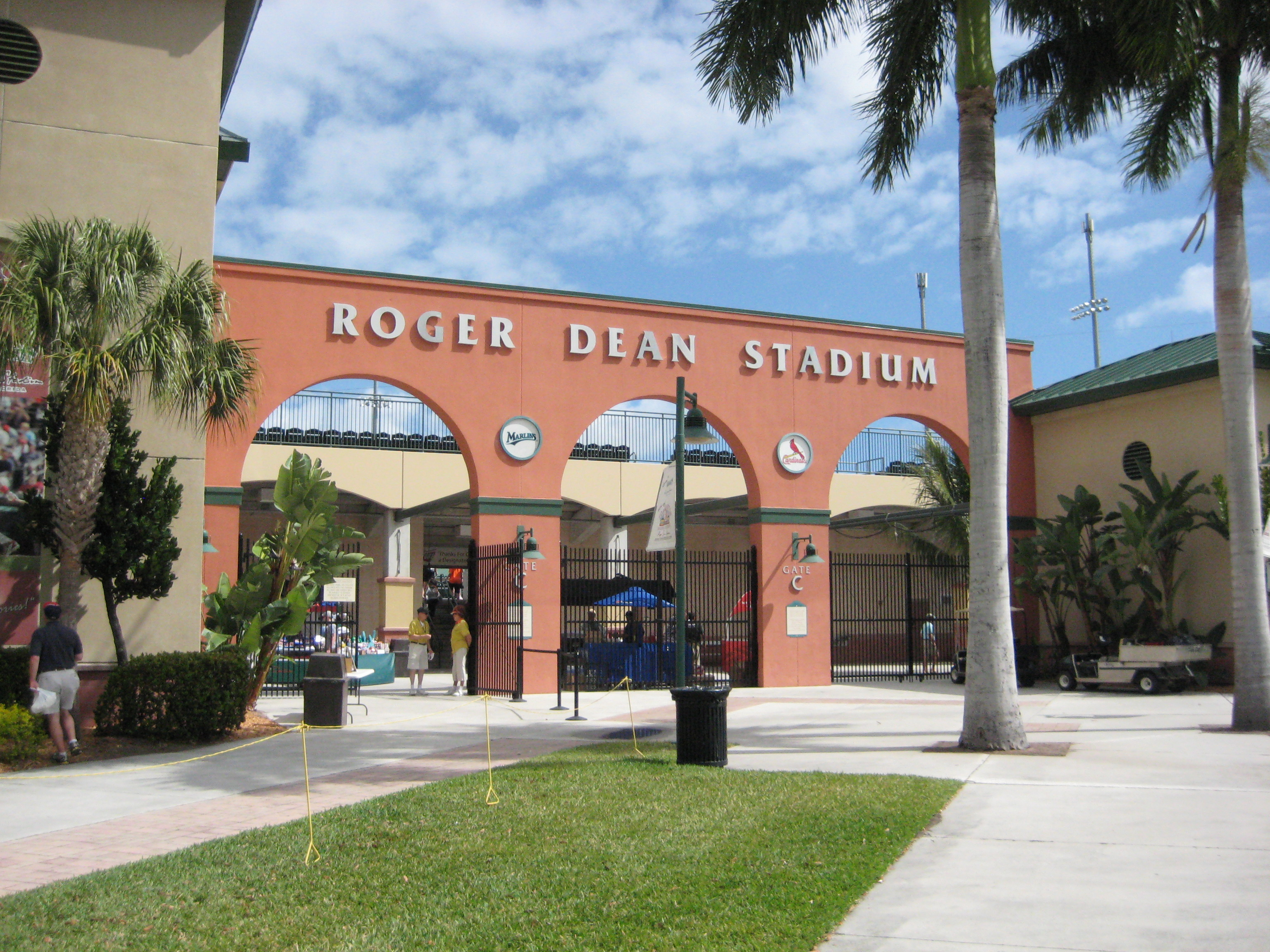
Roger Dean Chevrolet Stadium (Jupiter Hammerheads, Palm Beach Cardinals)

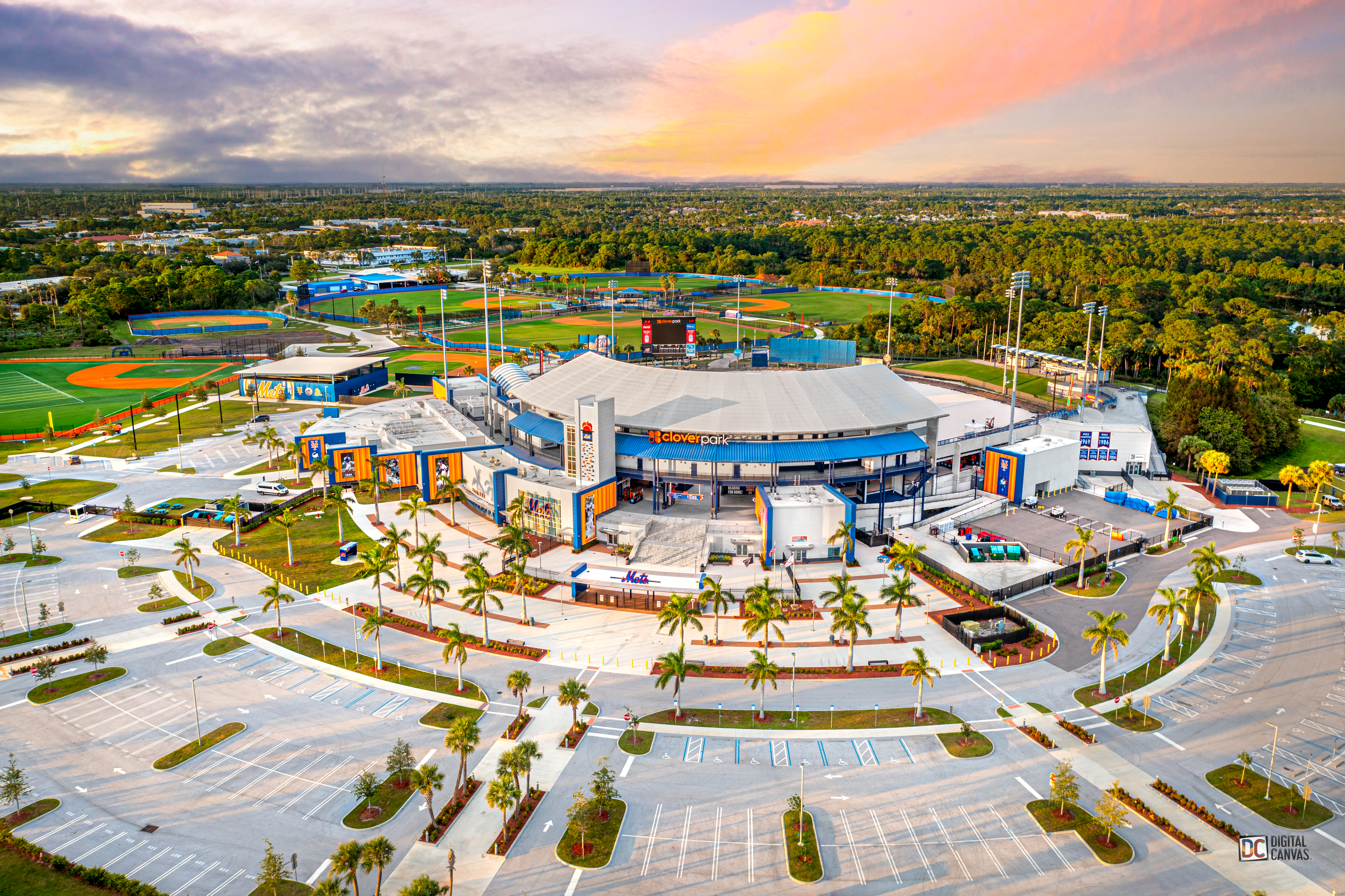
Clover Park (St. Lucie Mets)

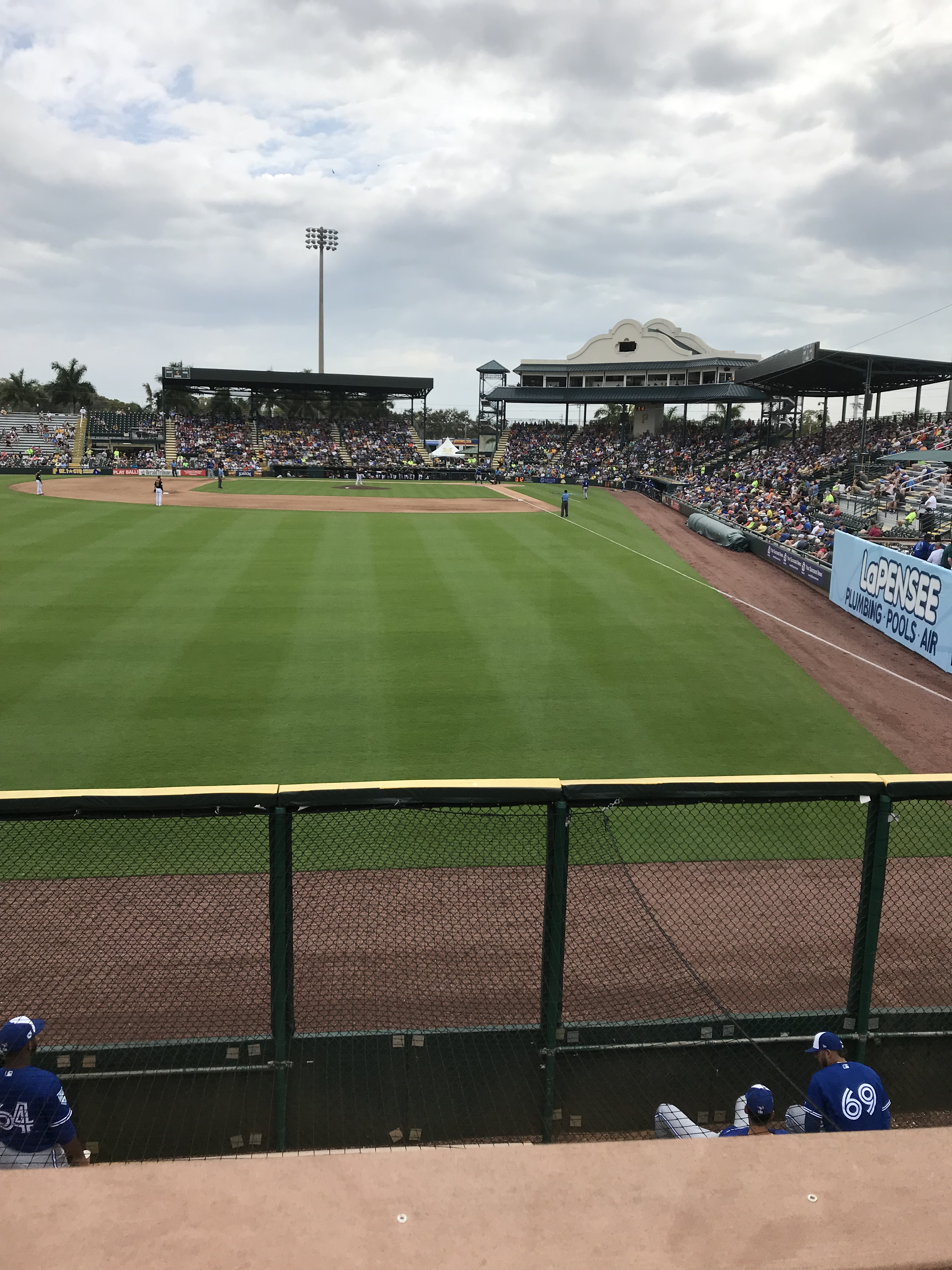
LECOM Park (Bradenton Marauders)

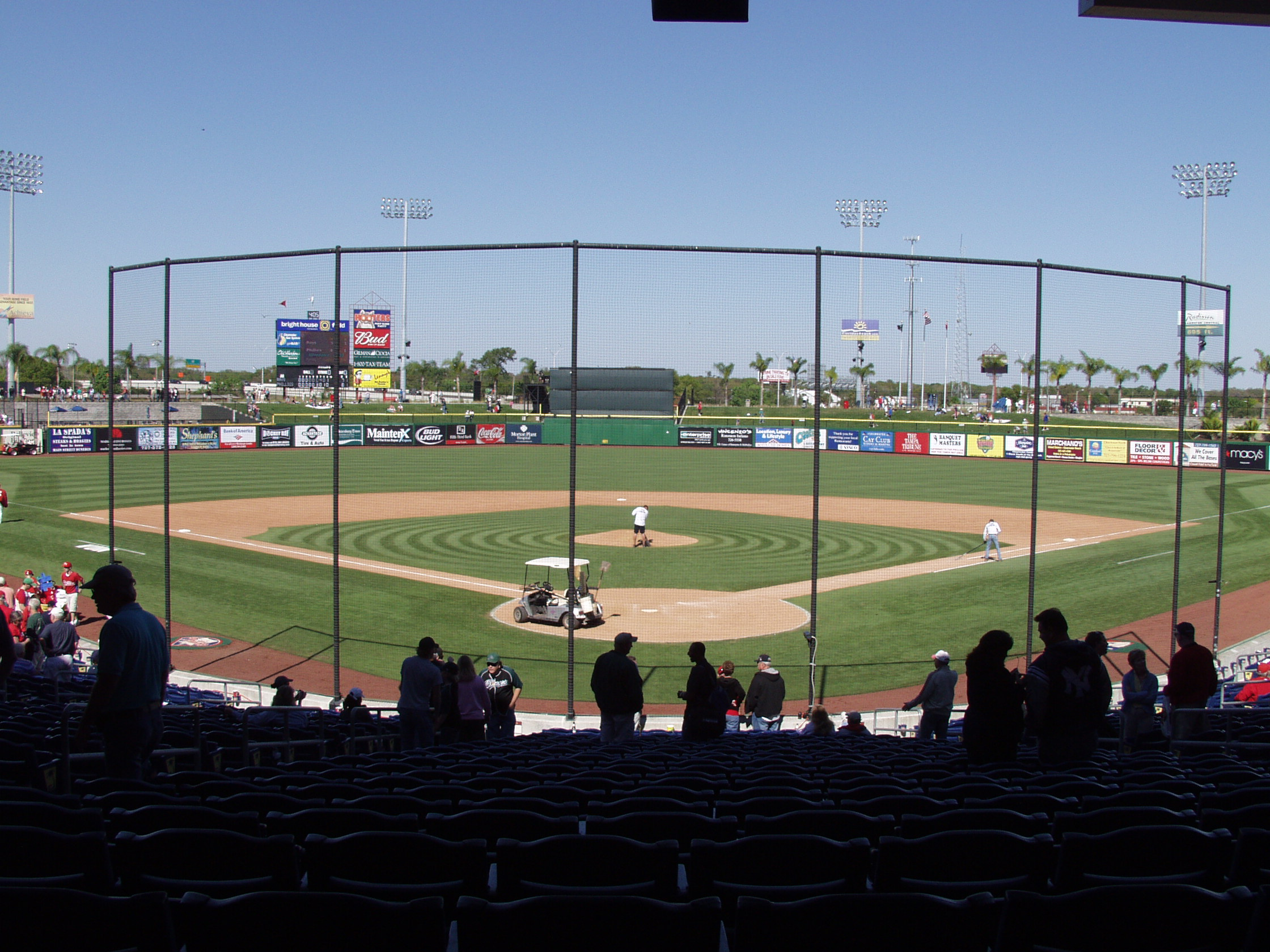
BayCare Ballpark (Clearwater Threshers)

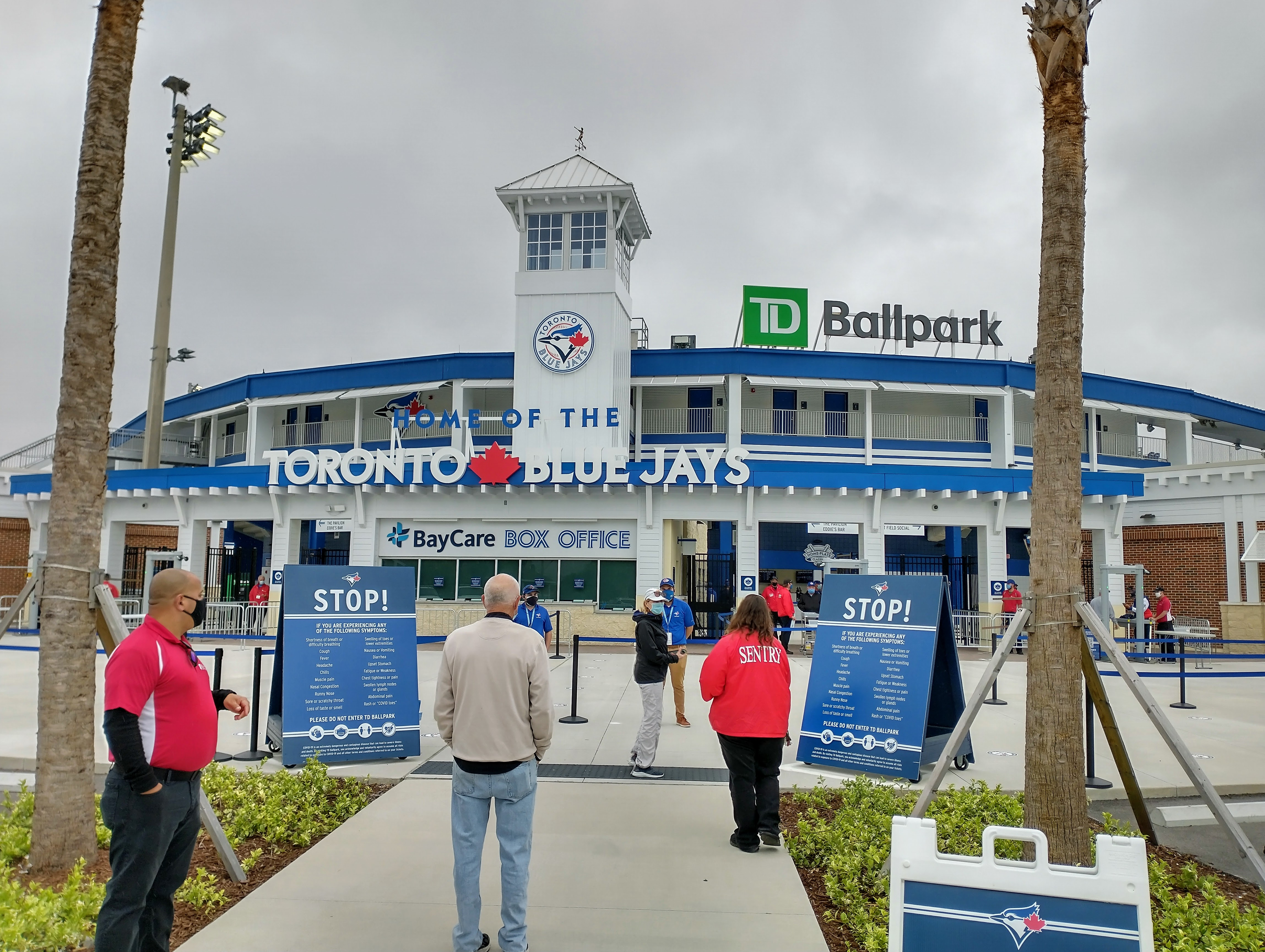
TD Ballpark (Dunedin Blue Jays)

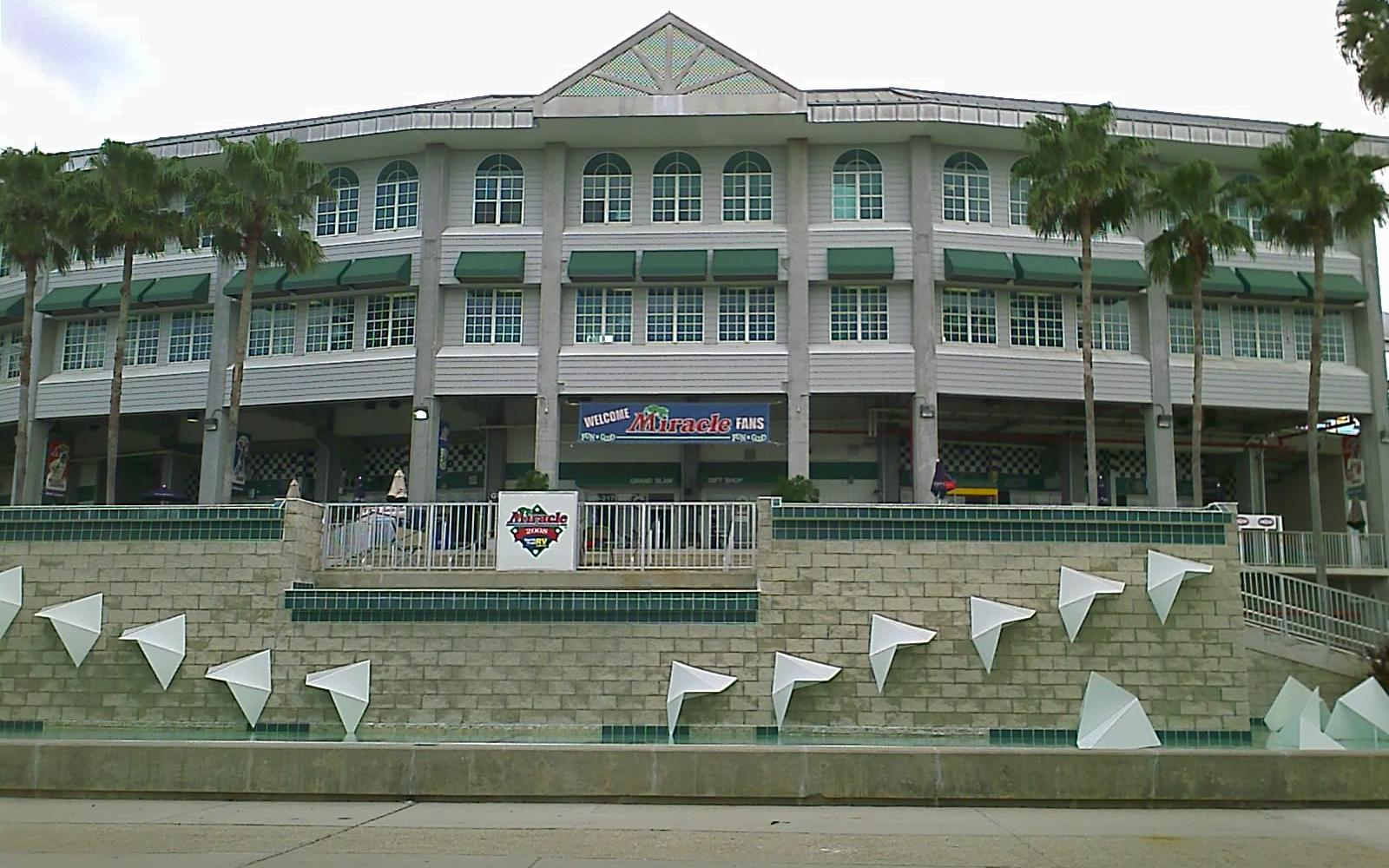
Hammond Stadium (Fort Myers Mighty Mussels)

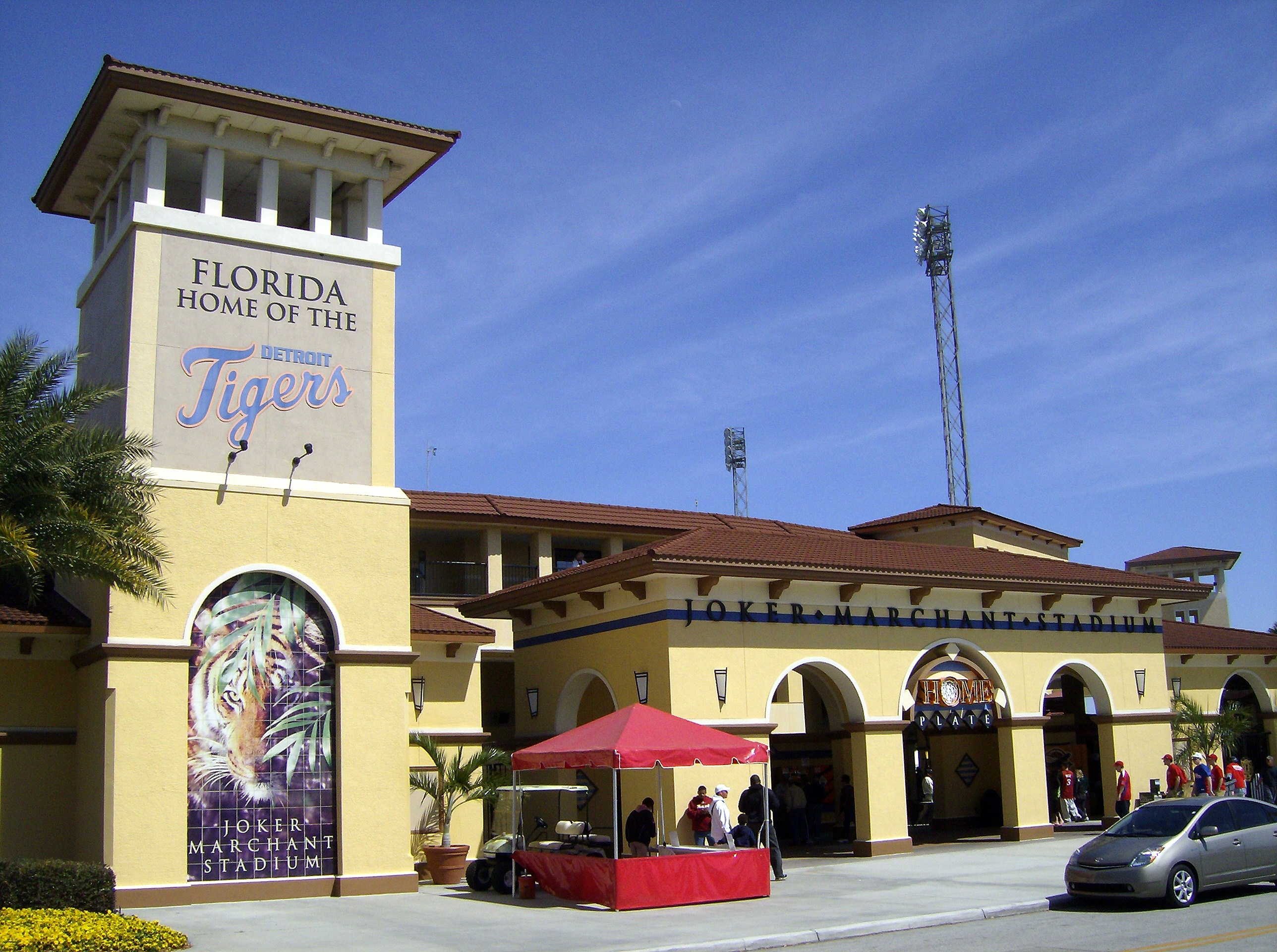
Joker Marchant Stadium (Lakeland Flying Tigers)

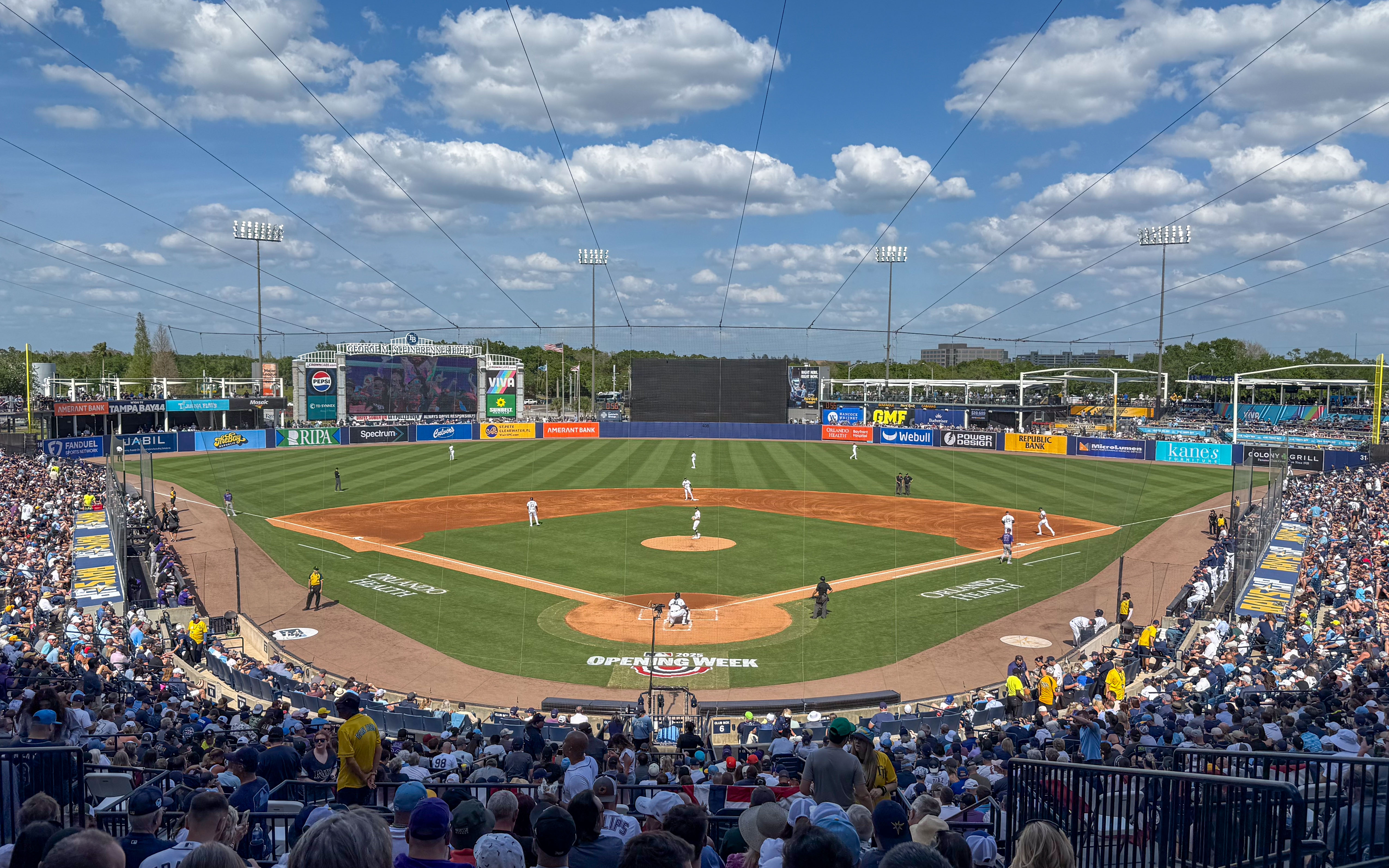
George M. Steinbrenner Field (Tampa Tarpons)

== All stadiums ==
Key
Name	Stadium's name in its last season of hosting FSL baseball
Opened	Opening of earliest stadium variant used for hosting FSL baseball
Capacity	Stadium's most recent capacity while hosting FSL baseball

Name	Team(s)	Locality in Florida	Opened	Capacity	Ref(s)
Bartow Ball Park	Bartow Polkers	Bartow			
Baseball City Stadium	Baseball City Royals	Haines City	1988	8,000	
Braden Town Base Ball Park	Bradenton Growers	Bradenton			
LECOM Park (Note: LECOM Park was previously known as McKechnie Field and Municipal Park (1923).)	Bradenton Growers, (Note: The Bradenton Growers started the 1923 season in Jacksonville and moved from there on or about June 10.) Bradenton Marauders	Bradenton	1923	8,500	
Space Coast Stadium	Brevard County Manatees	Melbourne Beach	1994	8,100	
Charlotte Sports Park (Note: Charlotte Sports Park was known as Charlotte County Stadium (1987–2008).)	Charlotte Rangers, Charlotte Stone Crabs	Port Charlotte	1987	6,917	
Jack Russell Stadium	Clearwater Phillies, Dunedin Blue Jays	Clearwater	1955	6,917	
BayCare Ballpark (Note: BayCare Ballpark was previously known as Bright House Networks Field.)	Clearwater Threshers	Clearwater	2004	8,500	
Charles D. Provost Park	Cocoa Indians	Cocoa		2,200	
Cocoa Stadium	Cocoa Astros	Cocoa		5,100	
Jackie Robinson Ballpark (Note: Jackie Robinson Ballpark was known as City Island Park (1914–1988).)	Daytona Beach Islanders/Dodgers/Astros/Admirals, (Note: The Daytona Beach Islanders moved to Clearwater on July 15, 1924, and became the Clearwater Pelicans.) Daytona Cubs/Tortugas	Daytona Beach	1914	4,200	
Municipal Stadium	Deerfield Beach Sun Sox (Note: The Deerfield Beach Sun Sox moved to Winter Haven on June 27, 1966, and became the Winter Haven Sun Sox.)	Deerfield Beach		2,250	
Conrad Park	DeLand Reds/Red Hats, DeLand Sun Caps	DeLand		1,000	
Grant Field	Dunedin Blue Jays	Dunedin	1939	3,500	
TD Ballpark (Note: TD Ballpark was previously known as Dunedin Stadium at Grant Field, Knology Park (2004–2008), and Florida Auto Exchange Stadium (2010–2017).)	Dunedin Blue Jays	Dunedin	1990	8,500	
Osceola County Stadium	Osceola Astros, Kissimmee Cobras, Florida Fire Frogs	Kissimmee	1984	5,180	
Fort Lauderdale Stadium (Note: Fort Lauderdale Stadium was known as Yankee Stadium (1962–1992).)	Fort Lauderdale Yankees/Red Sox	Fort Lauderdale	1962	8,300	
Terry Park (Note: Terry Park was known as T. Pigott Memorial Stadium (1925–1977).)	Fort Myers Palms, Fort Myers Royals	Fort Myers	1925	6,200	
Hammond Stadium (Note: Hammond Stadium was known as Lee County Sports Complex (1992–1995).)	Fort Myers Miracle/Mighty Mussels	Fort Myers	1991	9,300	
Harris Field	Gainesville G-Men	Gainesville		2,500	
Red Cap Stadium (Note: Red Cap Stadium was previously known as Barr's Field, Douglas Field, Durkee Field, and Jacksonville Baseball Park (1936–1954).)	Jacksonville Scouts/Indians	Jacksonville	1912	4,000	
Southside Park	Jacksonville Indians	Jacksonville			
Greater Beaches Stadium (Note: Greater Beaches Stadium was also known as Jacksonville Beach Municipal Stadium.)	Jacksonville Beach Sea Birds	Jacksonville Beach	1950	1,500	
Roger Dean Chevrolet Stadium	Jupiter Hammerheads, Palm Beach Cardinals	Jupiter	1998	6,871	
Wickers Stadium	Key West Padres/Sun Caps/Conchs/Cubs	Key West	1950	2,200	
Lakeland Ball Park	Lakeland Highlanders	Lakeland			
Henley Field	Lakeland Pilots, (Note: The Lakeland Pilots started the 1953 season as the Palatka Azaleas and moved from Palatka on May 15.) Lakeland Indians/Giants/Tigers	Lakeland	1924	800	
Publix Field at Joker Marchant Stadium	Lakeland Tigers/Flying Tigers	Lakeland	1966	8,500	
Ballpark at Venetian Gardens (Note: Ballpark at Venetian Gardens is now called Pat Thomas Park.)	Leesburg Gondoliers/Anglers/Pirates/Dodgers/Packers/Lakers/Braves/Orioles/Athletics	Leesburg	1937	3,500	
Miami Stadium (Note: Miami Stadium was also known as Bobby Maduro Stadium and Orioles Stadium.)	Miami Marlins/Orioles/Miracle	Miami	1949	13,500	
Sunblazer Field	Miami Miracle	Miami		1,500	
Pompano Beach Municipal Stadium	Miami Miracle, Pompano Beach Mets, Pompano Beach Cubs	Pompano Beach	1957	4,500	
Webb Field (Note: Webb Field was previously known as City Baseball Park and Gerig Park (1940).)	Ocala Yearlings	Ocala	1939	1,560	
Tinker Field	Orlando Caps/Tigers/Bulldogs/Colts/Gulls/Senators/C.B.s/Seratomas/Flyers/Dodgers/Twins	Orlando	1923	6,000	
Azalea Bowl	Palatka Azaleas, (Note: The Palatka Azaleas moved to Lakeland on May 15, 1953, and became the Lakeland Pilots.) Palatka Tigers/Redlegs/Cubs	Palatka		1,700	
Memorial Stadium (Note: Memorial Stadium was known as Sanford Athletic Field (1937) and Municipal Park (1938–1951).)	Sanford Lookouts/Seminoles/Celeryfeds, Sanford Giants/Seminole Blues/Cardinals/Greyhounds	Sanford	1926	3,200	
Payne Park	Sarasota Sun Sox	Sarasota	1924	4,800	
Ed Smith Stadium	Sarasota White Sox/Red Sox/Reds	Sarasota	1989	7,500	
Lewis Park	St. Augustine Saints	St. Augustine		1,200	
San Marco Park	St. Augustine Saints	St. Augustine		3,000	
Francis Field	St. Augustine Saints	St. Augustine		2,700	
Clover Park (Note: Clover Park was previously known as St. Lucie Sports Complex (1988–1992), Thomas J. White Stadium (1993–2003), Tradition Field (2004–2009, 2012–2016), Digital Domain Park (2010–2012), and First Data Field.)	St. Lucie Mets	Port St. Lucie	1988	7,160	
Moore Field	St. Petersburg Saints	St. Petersburg			
Waterfront Park	St. Petersburg Saints (Note: The St. Petersburg Saints started the 1928 season as the Fort Lauderdale Tarpons and moved from Fort Lauderdale on May 24.)	St. Petersburg		1,500	
Coffee Pot Park	St. Petersburg Saints	St. Petersburg	1914	4,000	
Al Lang Stadium (Note: Al Lang Stadium was known as Al Lang Field (1947–1954).)	St. Petersburg Saints/Cards/Cardinals/Devil Rays	St. Petersburg	1946	7,004	
Plant Field	Tampa Smokers	Tampa	1899	3,700	
Al Lopez Field	Tampa Tarpons	Tampa	1954	8,500	
USF Baseball Stadium	Tampa Yankees	Tampa	1967	3,000	
George M. Steinbrenner Field (Note: George M. Steinbrenner Field was previously known as Legends Field at Raymond James Stadium.)	Tampa Yankees/Tarpons	Tampa	1996	11,026	
Holman Stadium	Vero Beach Dodgers/Devil Rays	Vero Beach	1953	6,474	
Connie Mack Field (Note: Connie Mack Field was known as Municipal Athletic Field (1924–1926) and Wright Field (1927–1952).)	West Palm Beach Sheriffs, West Palm Beach Indians/Sun Chiefs	West Palm Beach	1924	4,500	
Municipal Stadium	West Palm Beach Braves, West Palm Beach Expos	West Palm Beach	1963	4,404	
Chain of Lakes Park	Winter Haven Sun Sox/Mets/Red Sox (Note: The Winter Haven Sun Sox started the 1966 season as the Deerfield Beach Sun Sox and moved from Deerfield Beach on June 27.)	Winter Haven	1966	5,000	

=== Map ===
Florida State League stadium locations

== See also ==
- List of Single-A baseball stadiums
- List of California League stadiums
- List of Carolina League stadiums
