= Sanford Celeryfeds (baseball) =

- 1919–1946; (1919–1920, 1925–1928, 1936–1941, 1946–1947); Sanford, Florida

Minor league affiliations
- Class: Class D (1919–1920, 1925–1928, 1936–1941, 1946–1947)
- League: Florida State League (1919–1920, 1925–1928, 1936–1941, 1946–1947)

Major league affiliations
- Team: Washington Senators (1936–1939)

Minor league titles
- League titles (3): 1919; 1926; 1939
- Conference titles (2): 1919; 1926
- Wild card berths (3): 1937; 1940; 1946

Team data
- Name: Sanford Celeryfeds (1919–1920, 1925–1928); Sanford Lookouts (1936–1939); Sanford Seminoles (1940–1941); Sanford Celeryfeds (1946); Sanford Seminoles (1947)
- Ballpark: Memorial Stadium (1919–1920, 1925–1928, 1936–1941, 1946–1947)

The Sanford Celeryfeds were a minor league baseball team, based in Sanford, Florida that played between 1919 and 1946. In 1919, the "Celeryfeds" were a charter member of the Class D level Florida State League, winning the first championship in the league. Sanford began a decades long tenure of play in the Florida State League, winning other league championships in 1926 and 1939.

The "Celeryfeds" nickname corresponded with the local celery agriculture industry in the era. The team uniforms contained a logo depicting celery stalks.

From 1936 to 1939, the Sanford "Lookouts" played as a minor league affiliate of the Washington Senators. The 1939 Sanford Lookouts team was listed as one of the 100 greatest minor league teams of all time. With Sanford located within Seminole County, Florida, the team was also known as the corresponding Sanford "Seminoles" for three seasons.

In the era, Sanford teams hosted home Florida State League games at the site of Memorial Stadium. The ballpark is still in use today, known as "Historic Sanford Memorial Stadium."

At the age of 17, Baseball Hall of Fame member Early Wynn played for the 1937 Sanford Lookouts in his first professional season.

The 1948 Sanford Giants continued Sanford's tenure as members of the Florida State League. The nickname change occurred after the New York Giants moved their spring training site to Sanford and the local franchise became a minor league affiliate of the Giants.

== History ==
=== 1919 and 1920: Celeryfeds begin minor league play / champions ===
The Sanford Base Ball Association hosted baseball games as early as 1908.

Minor league baseball began in Sanford, Florida in 1919, when the Sanford "Celeryfeds" became a charter member of the six-team Class D level Florida State League. Sanford joined the Bartow Polkers, Bradenton Growers, Lakeland Highlanders, Orlando Caps and Tampa Smokers teams as charter members.

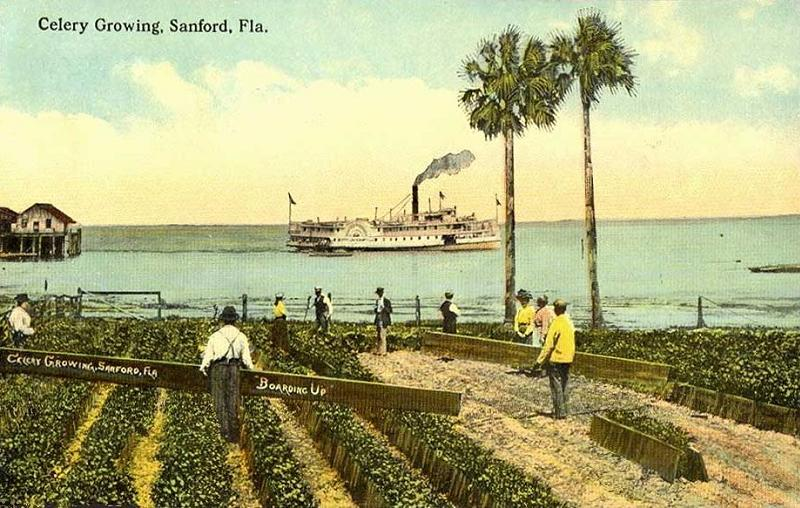
(1912) Postcard, Celery Growing. Sanford, Florida.

The Sanford "Celeryfeds" nickname corresponded with agriculture in the region in the era. In the era, celery was the dominant crop in the region. Sanford was known as "The Celery City" in the era. The celery agriculture industry began after a cold season harmed the citrus industry in the winter of 1884 to 1885. The Sanford Celeryfeds had uniforms with a logo depicting celery stalks.

Playing the first Florida State League season in 1919, the Sanford Celeryfeds won the overall league pennant and had a controversial playoff series. In a split season schedule, Sanford won the first half pennant and Orlando won the second half pennant in the regular season. The Celeryfeds' overall record of 47–28 was the best in the league. The team played the season under manager Ed Chaplin, who became a Sanford resident, dying in the city at age 84 in 1978. In winning the league pennant, Sanford finished the regular season 5.0 games ahead of Orlando in the overall standings. The finals champion was to be the first team to win 5 games. In the playoff final, Sanford won 5 games and the Orlando Caps 3 games. On October 11, 1919, two of the Sanford wins were disallowed due to ineligible player violations. The series was declared to be 3 games to 3 tie and the teams were declared co-champions. Stuffy Stewart of Sanford led the Florida State League with 63 runs scored.

The 1920 Florida State League expanded to eight teams and the Celeryfeds continued league play, finishing near the bottom of the standings of the Class D level league. The Bartow Polkers, Bradenton Growers, Daytona Beach Islanders and Orlando Caps joined the four returning teams in beginning the league schedule on May 1, 1920. The defending co-champion Celeryfeds ended the 1920 Florida State League season with a final record of 45–68. Sanford finished in seventh place, playing the season under manager Jack Burns and ended the regular season 42.0 games behind the first place Tampa Smokers. Playoffs were not held, as Tampa won both half seasons of the league schedule. The Florida State League became a six-team Class C level league in 1921 and the Sanford franchise did not return to the league, before rejoining in 1925.

=== 1925 to 1928: Florida State League reforms ===
The Sanford franchise returned to play in 1925, joining the reformed four-team Class D level Florida State League. The Lakeland Highlanders, St. Petersburg Saints and Tampa Smokers teams joined with Sanford in beginning league play on April 13, 1925.

The Sanford Celeryfeds ended the 1925 Florida State League season in last place among the four teams. Sanford had final record of 36–87 and finished in fourth place. Playing the season under managers Nick Carter and Jim Moore, Sanford finished 35.0 games behind first place Tampa in the overall standings. Lakeland won the first half of the split season schedule and Tampa won the second half. Tampa won the playoff series to claim the championship.

In the midst of their last place finish in the Florida State League, the Sanford franchise was nearly sold and relocated during the 1925 season. On July 10, 1925, businessman John Wall Hendry publicly announced that he had purchased the Sanford Celeryfeds and intended to move the team to Fort Myers, Florida. However, the next day, Charley Britt, owner of the Sanford Celeryfeds, cancelled the verbal agreement to sell the team after $5,000 was raised to keep the team in Sanford. Moving on from the Sanford purchase, Hendry next offered to purchase the Lakeland Highlanders, for $7,000, but an agreement with Clare Henley, president of the Lakeland franchise never materialized. Eventually, Hendry was successful in getting an expansion team in the Fort Myers for the 1926 Florida State League season, when the Fort Myers Palms joined the league.

The Stanford Celeryfeds continued Florida State League play in 1926 and were league champions of the expanded eight-team league. The new Bradenton Growers, Fort Myers Palms, Orlando Colts and Sarasota Gulls teams joined with the four returning teams in beginning league play on April 22, 1926.

The Celeryfeds had a record of 70–35 and ended the 1926 season in the overall first place, winning the championship under manager Lee Crowe. Sanford ended the Florida State League season 3.5 games ahead of the second place Tampa Smokers. No playoffs were held as Sanford won both halves of the split season schedule. Sanford's Otto Dumas won the Florida State League batting championship, hitting 361, while also hitting a co-league leading 4 home runs. Teammate Ralph Dunbar scored a league leading 95 runs. Pitcher Ben Cantwell of Sanford won 24 games (with just 4 losses) to lead the Florida State League.

Sanford pitcher Ben Cantwell had a ten-year major-league career. While pitching for Sanford he met LeClaire Jones, whom he married in March 1927. After winning 25 games for the 1927 Jacksonville Tars of the Class B level Southeastern League, Cantwell made his major league debut with the New York Giants on August 19, 1927.

Following the 1926 season, Sanford hosted the Florida State League winter meetings and franchise movements took place. On January 18, 1927, at the winter meeting in Sanford, the Fort Myers franchise was voted to have been "forfeited." The franchise was dissolved for "failing to meet league assessments and for failing to pay players." Later, the Miami Hustlers joined the Florida State League after by W. B. Kirby, the former president of the Bradenton Growers turned the Bradenton franchise over to Miami as part of his investment in the Miami franchise.

In defending their championship the previous season, the 1927 Sanford Celeryfeds finished in second place in the overall standings but did not qualify for the playoffs. The Celeryfeds ended the season with an overall record of 68–53, finishing 2.5 games behind first place Orlando as Lee Crowe returned as manager. The Orlando Colts won the first half of the season schedule and the Miami Hustlers won the second half, as Orlando took the championship series. Cecil Frisbie of Sanford led the Florida State League with both 78 runs and 145 hits. Celeryfeds' pitcher Herman Myers had a 13–4 record to top the league in winning percentage.

Following the 1927 season, Sanford manager Lee Crowe left the team to become the manager of the rival Miami Hustlers for the 1928 Florida State League season.

The 1928 six-team Class D level Florida State League had a shortened season with Sanford continuing play. The Florida State League folded on July 4, 1928. The Celeryfeds had compiled a record of 25–33 and were in fifth place when the league folded. Sanford finished 12.0 games behind first place St. Petersburg Saints. Sanford was managed by Pop Wallace. The Florida State league did not play in the 1929 season and had a seven-season hiatus during The Great Depression before reforming in 1936.

=== 1936 to 1939: Sanford Lookouts / championship season ===
In 1936, the renamed Sanford "Lookouts" rejoined the six-team reformed Florida State League. The Daytona Beach Islanders, DeLand Reds, Gainesville G-Men, Palatka Azaleas and St. Augustine Saints teams joined Sanford in beginning league play in the Class D level league on April 19, 1936.

Playing as a minor league affiliate of the Washington Senators, Sanford ended the 1936 Florida State League regular season in fifth place. The Lookouts finished with a record of 56–62, managed by Stuffy McCrone (18–30) and Bill Rodgers (38–32). Rogers managed the Lookouts in the first of his four consecutive seasons. Sanford ended the Florida State League regular season 8.0 games behind the first place Gainesville G-Men in the final standings. Sanford did not qualify for the four0team playoffs, which were won by the St. Augustine Saints.

Bill Rodgers would continue to manage Sanford in each of the next three seasons. Following his major league playing career Rodgers served as a player or manager in the minor leagues during 22 seasons between 1918 and 1951. During the 1846 season, Rodgers also managed the Peoria Redwings of the newly formed All-American Girls Professional Baseball League. Rodgers had the nickname "Rawmeat Bill," as he faithfully followed a diet that included eating uncooked meat.

The Lookouts placed second in the 1937 Florida State League and advanced to the playoff finals, as the league expanded to become an eight-team league. The Lookouts ended the regular seasons with a record of 79–60 under returning manager Bill Rodgers (30–12), Lee Head (21–26) and the returning Rodgers (28–22). Manager Bill Rodgers left the team for a period and managed at both Charlotte and Chattanooga before returning to Sanford. Sanford ended the regular season 6.5 games behind the first place Gainesville G-Men in the final standings. Sanford qualified for the playoffs and won their first round series 3 games to 2, defeating the DeLand Reds. The Lookouts lost in the finals 4 games to 2 to the Gainesville G-Men. Ellis Clary of Sanford led the Florida State League with 122 runs scored.

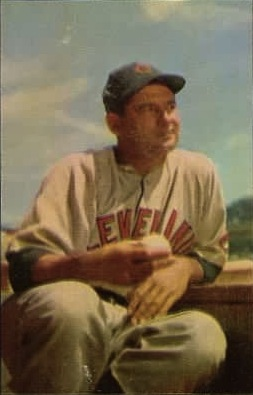
(1953) Baseball Hall of Fame member Early Wynn, Cleveland. At age 17, Wynn pitched for Sanford in 1937.

At age 17, future Baseball Hall of Fame member Early Wynn played as a member 1937 Sanford Lookouts in his first professional season. In the spring of 1937, Wynn traveled from his home in Hartford, Alabama to Sanford, Florida, to attend a baseball camp operated by the Washington Senators. It was said that the 6'0" 200-pound Wynn arrived at the camp wearing coveralls. Clyde Milan, a Washington scout, saw Wynn's fastball and signed immediately him to a contract. Wynn subsequently dropped out of high school and began his professional career in 1937 with Sanford. He compiled a record of 16–11 with a 3.41 ERA pitching for Sanford in the 1937 season. Wynn would go on to win 300 games in the major leagues and was inducted into the Baseball Hall of Fame in 1972. He is also a member of the Florida State League Hall of Fame.

The 1938 Sanford Lookouts finished in last place in the final standings of the eight-team Class D level Florida State League. The Lookouts ended the regular season with a record of 53-87 and finished in eighth place under manager Guy Lacy and the returning Bill Rodgers. Sanford ended the regular season 34.5 games behind the first place Leesburg Gondoliers. With their last place finish, Sanford did not qualify for the playoffs won by the Gainesville G-Men.

In February 1939, 36-year-old Dale Alexander, was hired to become the player-manager for the Sanford Lookouts in the Florida State League. As a rookie with the Detroit Tigers in 1929, Alexander led the American League with 215 total hits, and had a total of 272 RBIs in his first two major league seasons. In 1932, while playing for the Boston Red Sox, Alexander won the American League batting championship, hitting .367 and winning the title over Baseball Hall of Fame member Jimmie Foxx (.364) of the Philadelphia Athletics. For his efforts in winning the batting title, Boston raised his salary by $500, from $10,500 to $11,000. In May 1933, Alexander received third degree burns on his leg and developed gangrene after receiving a diathermy treatment on an injured knee. The injuries from the burns and infection permanently limited his mobility as a 6'3" 210 pound first baseman, effectively ending his major league career. Alexander continued to play in the minor leagues and would compile a .334 batting average with 2,145 hits and 1,171 RBIs in minor league play through 1942. In 1938, Alexander played for the Chattanooga Lookouts in the Southern Association. He was traded by Chattanooga to the Dallas Steers but refused to report to Dallas and temporarily retired before accepting the player-manager position with Sanford.

The Sanford Lookouts went from last place to a championship in winning the 1939 Florida State League title. Sanford ended the regular season with a record of 98–35, finishing in first place. Playing the season under player/manager Dale Alexander, the Lookouts finished 12.0 games ahead of the second place Daytona Beach Islanders in the regular season standings. In the four-team playoffs, Sanford defeated the DeLand Red Hats 3 games to 2 in the first round to advance. In the finals, Sanford then defeated the Daytona Beach Islanders 4 games to 3 to win the 1939 Florida State League championship. Player/manager Dale Alexander appeared in 98 games as a player and hit .345 with 80 RBIs and 14 stolen bases. Sanford pitcher Sid Hudson had a pitching triple crown in the Florida State League. Hudson won 24 games with 192 strikeouts and a 1.79 ERA to lead the Florida State League in all three categories.

The 1939 Sanford Lookouts were recognized in 2001 as one of the 100 greatest minor league teams of all time.

Following his impressive season with Sanford in 1939, Sid Hudson became a two-time all-star pitcher in the major leagues. Following his playing career, he first became a scout. Then Hudson was hired to become the pitching coach of the Washington Senators, serving in that role from 1961 to 1971 with Washington. When the Senators team moved to become the Texas Rangers in 1972, manager Ted Williams retained Hudson to serve as the team's pitching coach. Hudson remained with the Texas Rangers organization until his retirement 1986.

=== 1940 to 1947: War interrupted Florida State League seasons ===
Following the 1939 season, Washington did not carry over their affiliation and Sanford continued play unaffiliated with a major league franchise. Player/manager Dale Alexander did not return to Sanford in 1940, as he became the player-manager for the Washington Senators affiliated Thomasville Tourists in the Georgia-Florida League and hit .388 in 91 games and 330 at bats for Thomasville.

With a new manager, the 1940 Sanford team became known as the "Seminoles" and the team defended their championship in the 1940 Florida State League, advancing to the league finals. Sanford is the county seat of Seminole County, Florida.

On Friday, August 20, 1940, Sanford hosted the Florida State League All-Star Game at Municipal Stadium. The game was scheduled to start at 8:00 P.M. and featured the Sanford Seminoles team facing the All-Star selections from teams throughout the league. A reserved seat for the contest was $0.50.

Sanford ended the 1940 eight-team Florida State League regular season in second place in the Class D level league. The Seminoles finished with a record of 84–55, playing the season under manager Lynn Campbell. The Seminoles ended the season 2.0 games behind the pennant winning Daytona Beach Islanders. In the first round of the playoffs, Sanford defeated St. Augustine 3 games to 0 to advance. Sanford then lost in the league Finals being swept in 4 games by the Orlando Senators. Sanford's Ralph Hyder led the Florida State League with both 126 runs scored and 196 total hits.

The Sanford Seminoles folded before the conclusion of the 1941 Florida State League season after the league began the season with eight teams. The Seminoles disbanded on June 25, 1941, with a final record of 20–45, playing under managers Joe Justice, Joe Whitlock and Charles Girk. The Leesburg Anglers were the eventual league pennant winners and the four-team playoff champions, as the league continued play with the remaining seven teams, following Sanford's departure.

After the 1941 season, the Florida State League stopped play due to the onset of World War II.

In 1945, the football team at Seminole High School based in Sanford were known as the "Celery Feds" and the school's student newspaper at the time was The Celery Fed.

The Sanford "Celeryfeds" nickname returned, and the team resumed Florida State League play in 1946. Following the conclusion of World War II, the Florida State League reformed as an eight-team Class D level league. The Daytona Beach Islanders, DeLand Red Hats, Gainesville G-Men, Leesburg Anglers, Orlando Senators, Palatka Azaleas and St. Augustine Saints teams joined Sanford in beginning league play on April 16, 1946.

In returning to play in the reformed league, Sanford ended the 1946 season in second place in the Florida State League regular season standings. The Celeryfeds had a final record of 81–57, playing under manager Ed Levy and finished 13.0 games behind the first place Orlando Senators in the final regular season standings. Qualifying for the playoffs, Sanford lost in the league finals. The Celeryfeds defeated the St. Augustine Saints in the first round of the playoffs 4 games to 3. Sanford then lost to Orlando in a 7-game series in the finals to fall one game short of the championship.

In 1947, the team became known again as the Sanford "Seminoles," continuing play as members of the Class D level Florida State League and ending the season in second place. In 1947, Sanford was represented by John Krider on the Florida State League board of Directors. Arthur Beckwith served as the Official Scorer for games at Sanford. The Seminoles ended the season with a record of 69–66, to finish in fifth place, playing the season under managers B.D. Lake (22–28), Don Murray (23–23) and John Krider (24–15). Sanford finished 15.5 games behind the first place St. Augustine Saints in the regular season standings and just 0.5 game behind the fourth place Orlando Senators for the final playoff spot. With their fifth-place finish, Sanford did not qualify for the four-team playoffs, won by the Gainesville G-Men over St. Augustine in the final.

=== 1947: New York Giants partnership with Sanford ===
Beginning on October 7, 1947, the major league New York Giants had partnered with Sanford, Florida to develop a 10-field complex to host the Giants' Spring Training site. The ballfields were located between Mellonville Avenue and Summerlin Avenue, bordered by 26th Street and 28th Street. 30 acres were utilized along the south end of 28th street containing six of the ballfields. The New York Giants also became owners of the Mayfair Inn hotel and the Mayfair Country Club golf course in Sanford. In 1934, local businessman William E. Kirchhoff leased the hotel site and the refurbished hotel reopened in 1935 at the Mayfair Hotel, after opening in 1926 known as the Hotel Forrest Lake. The Mayfair Inn developed a reputation as one of finest hotels in the region in the era. In 1948, William Kirchhoff sold the hotel to Horace Stoneham, the owner of the New York Giants.

In 1948, the Sanford Florida State League franchise became a minor league affiliate of the New York Giants. The renamed Sanford Giants then continued Sanford's tenure of membership the Florida State League.

== The ballpark ==
Sanford hosted home minor league games at the site of Sanford Memorial Stadium. The ballpark site also contained the Sanford Athletic Field and the two ballparks were side by side.

In 1940, Municipal Stadium hosted the Florida State League All-Star Game held on Friday, August 20, 1940. A reserved seat for the all-star game was priced at $0.50.

In 1942, the Boston Braves used Municipal Stadium as its primary spring training facility.

On March 7, 1946, Sanford Stadium was the site of an incident involving Jackie Robinson in an exhibition game between the St. Paul Saints and the Montreal Royals. Robinson had recently been signed by the Brooklyn Dodgers and assigned to the Montreal Royals farm team. At the time, the city of Sanford did not allow integrated baseball teams to use city owned ballfields. During the game, Roy Williams, the police chief of Sanford, entered the dugout and forced Robinson to leave the ballpark. Robinson returned to the Royals' spring training site in Daytona Beach, Florida.

In 1947, the New York Giants partnered with the city of Sanford to develop a 10-field complex as a Spring Training site. The new ballfields were located further south, between Mellonville Avenue and Summerlin Avenue, bordered by 26th Street and 28th Street. Municipal Stadium was renovated to serve the Giants for hosting home spring training games.

The ballpark is still in use today, known as "Historic Sanford Memorial Stadium." The ballpark is located at Mellonville Avenue & East 11th Street in Sanford, Florida.

== Timeline ==
| Year(s) | # Yrs. | Team | Level | League | Affiliate | Ballpark |
|---|---|---|---|---|---|---|
| 1919–1920 | 2 | Sanford Celeryfeds | Class D | Florida State League | None | Memorial Stadium |
| 1925–1928 | 4 | Sanford Celeryfeds | Class D | Florida State League | None | Memorial Stadium |
| 1936–1939 | 4 | Sanford Lookouts | Class D | Florida State League | Washington Senators | Memorial Stadium |
| 1940–1941 | 2 | Sanford Seminoles | Class D | Florida State League | None | Memorial Stadium |
| 1946 | 1 | Sanford Celeryfeds | Class D | Florida State League | None | Memorial Stadium |
| 1947 | 1 | Sanford Seminoles | Class D | Florida State League | None | Memorial Stadium |

== Year–by–year records ==
| Year | Record | Finish | Manager | Playoffs/Notes |
Sanford Celeryfeds (Florida State League)
| 1919 | 47–28 | 1st | Ed Chaplin | Won league pennant Co-Champions |
| 1920 | 45–68 | 7th | Jack Burns | No playoffs held |
| 1925 | 36–87 | 4th | Nick Carter / Jim Moore | Did not qualify |
| 1926 | 70–35 | 1st | Lee Crowe | Won both half-seasons League champions |
| 1927 | 68–53 | 2nd | Lee Crowe | Did not qualify |
| 1928 | 25–33 | 5th | Pop Wallace | League disbanded July 4 |
Sanford Lookouts (Florida State League)
| 1936 | 56–62 | 5th | Stuffy McCrone (18–30) / Bill Rodgers (38–32) | Did not Qualify |
| 1937 | 79–60 | 2nd | Bill Rodgers (30–12) / Lee Head (21–26) / Bill Rodgers (28–22) | Lost in finals |
| 1938 | 53-87 | 8th | Guy Lacy / Bill Rodgers | Did not qualify |
| 1939 | 98–35 | 1st | Dale Alexander | Won league pennant League champions |
Sanford Seminoles (Florida State League)
| 1940 | 84–55 | 2nd | Len Campbell | Lost in finals |
| 1941 | 20–45 | NA | Joe Justice /Joe Whitlock / Charles Girk | Team disbanded June 25 |
Sanford Celeryfeds (Florida State League)
| 1946 | 81–57 | 2nd | Ed Levy | Lost in finals |
Sanford Seminoles (Florida State League)
| 1947 | 69–66 | 5th | B.D. Lake (22–28) / Don Murray (23–23) / John Krider (24–15) | Did not qualify |

== Notable alumni ==
- Early Wynn (1937) Inducted, Baseball Hall of Fame 1972
- Dale Alexander (1939) 1932 AL Batting Title
- Horace Allen (1927)
- Jack Burns (1920, MGR)
- Ben Cantwell (1926)
- Nick Carter (1925, MGR)
- Ed Chaplin (1919, MGR)
- Ellis Clary (1937)
- Vance Dinges (1938)
- Jim Hayes (1940)
- Sammy Holbrook (1937)
- Sid Hudson (1938–1939) 2x MLB All-Star
- Joe Justice (1940)
- Mike Kelly (1925)
- Wes Kingdon (1937)
- Guy Lacy (1938, MGR)
- Hillis Layne (1936)
- Ed Levy (1946, MGR)
- Mickey Livingston (1937)
- Red Lutz (1920)
- Bob Prichard (1937)
- Johnny Riddle (1927)
- Red Roberts (1940)
- Bill Rodgers (1936–1938, MGR)
- Stuffy Stewart (1919)
- Gil Torres (1936)
- Johnny Walker (1921)
- John Wilson (1926)

== See also ==
- Sanford Celeryfeds players
- Sanford Seminoles players
- Sanford Lookouts players
- List of Florida State League champions
- Florida State League Hall of Fame
