= Florida State League Hall of Fame =

The Florida State League Hall of Fame was created in 2009 to honor the best players, managers, umpires and executives in the long history of the Florida State League. The inaugural class was selected by a committee and be officially enshrined in November. It included all current Hall of Famers who played in the FSL.

== Key ==
Years	Years associated in the Florida State League
Position	Positions at which the individual is known.
Teams	FSL teams the individual was associated with
Inducted	Year Inducted into the FSL Hall of Fame
P	Pitcher
C	Catcher
1B	First baseman
2B	Second baseman

3B	Third baseman
SS	Shortstop
OF	Outfielder
COA	Coach
EXEC	Baseball executives, such as a general manager
MGR	Managers
OWN	Club owner
UMP	Umpires

== Members ==
Player	Years	Position	Teams	Inducted
Manny Acta	1998–2000	MGR	Kissimmee Cobras	2017
Felipe Alou	1977, 1986–1991	MGR	Cocoa Indians, West Palm Beach Expos	2010
Joe Altobelli	1951	1B	Daytona Beach Islanders	2017
Josh Beckett	2001	P	Brevard County Manatees, Jupiter Hammerheads	2015
Adrian Beltre	1997	3B	Vero Beach Dodgers	2017
Johnny Bench	1965	C	Tampa Tarpons	2009
Elliot Bigelow	1920	OF	St. Petersburg Saints	2012
Charlie Blaney	1987–1998	EXEC	Vero Beach Dodgers	2010
Marc Bombard	1984–1987	MGR	Tampa Yankees	2016
Debbie Brooks	1987	EXEC	Tampa Tarpons	2015
Rod Carew	1965	2B	Orlando Twins	2009
Ken Carson	1987	EXEC	Dunedin Blue Jays	2012
Gary Carter	1972	C	West Palm Beach Expos	2009
Evan Chambers	2011–2012	OF	Bradenton Marauders	2017
Jerry Crawford	1970	UMP		2017
Phil Cuzzi		UMP		2009
Bill Dancy	1992-92, 1998–1999	MGR	Clearwater Phillies	2013
Frank Decker	1972–1992	OWN	Lakeland Tigers	2010
Carlos Delgado	1992	1B	Dunedin Blue Jays	2010
Lee Elia	1990–1991	MGR	Clearwater Phillies	2014
Sid Fernandez	1982	P	Vero Beach Dodgers	2010
Rollie Fingers	1965	P	Leesburg Athletics	2009
Jim Fuller	1970–1971	OF, IB	Miami Marlins	2014
Rich Garcia	1970–1971	UMP		2015
Kirk Gibson	1978	OF	Lakeland Tigers	2015
Paul Gilliford	1966	P	Miami Marlins	2014
Steve Gliner	2003–2016	EXEC	Fort Myers Miracle	2019
Marvin Goldklang	1980–present	OWN	Fort Myers Miracle	2010
Fredi Gonzalez	1990–1991, 1994–1996	MGR	Miami Orioles, Brevard County Manatees	2012
Brian Gorman	1983–1985	UMP		2012
Travis Hafner	2000	1B	Charlotte Rangers	2016
Roy Halladay	1996, 2001	P	Dunedin Blue Jays	2016
Aaron Harang	2000	P	Charlotte Rangers	2017
Ed Hickox	1983–1985, 2004	UMP		2010
Sonny Hirsch	1958–1997	EXEC	Miami Orioles, Miami Marlins	2012
John Hirschbeck		UMP		2016
Ryan Howard	2003	1B	Clearwater Phillies	2016
Catfish Hunter	1964	P	Daytona Beach Islanders	2009
Dave Huppert	1993, 1999–2001, 2007, 2011–2016	MGR	Sarasota White Sox, Brevard County Manatees, Clearwater Threshers, Lakeland Flying Tigers	2012
Clint Hurdle	1988–1989	MGR	St. Lucie Mets	2011
Ferguson Jenkins	1962–1963	P	Miami Marlins	2009
Derek Jeter	1994	SS	Tampa Yankees	2011
Randy Johnson	1986	P	West Palm Beach Expos	2017
Stanley Karpinski	1946–1949, 1952	P	St. Augustine Saints	2010
Dan Keith	1955	1B/MGR	Daytona Beach Islanders, Sanford Cardinals	2010
Darold Knowles	1991–1999	COA	Clearwater Phillies	2011
Jordan Kobritz	1993–1994	EXEC	Daytona Cubs	2017
Gene Lamont	1978–1980	MGR	Fort Myers Royals	2016
Al Lang	1923–1925	EXEC	FSL	2012
Jerry Layne		UMP		2013
Johnny Lipon	1960, 1988–1992	SS/MGR	Lakeland Indians, Lakeland Tigers	2009
Cliff Lee	2001	P	Jupiter Hammerheads	2017
Jim Leyland	1964, 1969, 1976–1978	MGR	Lakeland Tigers	2010
Kenny Lofton	1990	OF	Osceola Astros	2015
Al López	1925–1926	C	Tampa Smokers	2009
Mitch Lukevics	2009–present	EXEC	Charlotte Stone Crabs	2015
Joe McDonald	1965–1980	EXEC	Winter Haven Mets, Pompano Beach Mets	2017
Omar Malavé	2004–2009, 2014–2015	MGR	Dunedin Blue Jays	2015
Randy Marsh	1970–1972	UMP		2014
Ramón Martínez	1987	P	Vero Beach Dodgers	2013
Joe Mauer	2003–2004	1B	Fort Myers Miracle	2016
Kevin Mench	2000	OF	Charlotte Rangers	2015
Jay Miller	1987	EXEC	Charlotte Rangers	2012
Don Miers	1980–present	EXEC	Daytona Beach Astros, Osceola Astros, Lakeland Tigers	2016
Mike Moore	1971–1988	EXEC, OWN	Tampa Tarpons	2009
Lloyd Moseby	1979	OF	Dunedin Blue Jays	2012
Chuck Murphy	1990–2015	EXEC	FSL	2011
Tim Murphy	1989–1992	EXEC	Charlotte Rangers	2017
Emo Murphy	1990–2015	EXEC	FSL	2011
Eddie Murray	1974	1B	Miami Orioles	2009
Stan Musial	1940	OF	Daytona Beach Islanders	2009
Ron Myers	1980–1993	EXEC	Lakeland Tigers	2013
Gene Nelson	1980	P	Fort Lauderdale Yankees	2011
Al Nipper	1980–1981	P	Winter Haven Red Sox	2013
Pat O'Conner	1986–1993	EXEC	Osceola Astros	2014
Jim Palmer	1967–1968	P	Miami Marlins	2009
Rob Rabenecker	c.1992–present	EXEC	West Palm Beach Expos, Jupiter Hammerheads, Palm Beach Cardinals	2015
Dick Radatz Jr.		EXEC	Vero Beach Dodgers, Sarasota Red Sox	2016
Cal Ripken Jr.	1979	2B/SS/3B	Miami Orioles	2009
Terry Reynolds	1983–1998	EXEC	Vero Beach Dodgers	2010
Iván Rodríguez	1990	C	Charlotte Rangers	2011
Jimmy Rollins	1998	SS	Clearwater Phillies	2013
Nolan Ryan	1967	P	Winter Haven Mets	2009
Buck Showalter	1987–1989	MGR	Fort Lauderdale Yankees	2013
Tom Simmons	1987–1997	EXEC	Vero Beach Dodgers	2015
John Smith	1955	P	Daytona Beach Islanders	2011
Luis Sojo	2006–2013	MGR	Tampa Yankees	2015
George Steinbrenner	1994–2010	OWN	Tampa Yankees	2009
Jeff Suppan	1994	P	Sarasota Red Sox	2012
Frank Thomas	1989	1B	Sarasota White Sox	2015
John Timberlake	1987–2014	EXEC	Clearwater Phillies, Clearwater Threshers	2014
Joe Tinker	1921	SS	Orlando Tigers	2009
Bob Tewksbury	1982, 1995	P	Fort Lauderdale Yankees, Charlotte Rangers	2012
Dave Trembley	1995–1996, 2001–2002	MGR	Daytona Cubs	2012
Mike Veeck		EXEC	Fort Myers Miracle	2013
Justin Verlander	2005	P	Lakeland Flying Tigers	2015
Early Wynn	1937	P	Sanford Lookouts	2009
Stan Wasiak	1970–1972, 1980–1986	2B/C/MGR	Daytona Beach Dodgers, Vero Beach Dodgers	2009
Vernon Wells	1999	OF	Dunedin Blue Jays	2014
Harry Wendelstedt		UMP		2009
Lou Whitaker	1976	2B	Lakeland Tigers	2012
Kerry Wood	1996	P	Daytona Cubs	2014
David Wright	2003	3B	St. Lucie Mets	2013
Richie Zisk	2000, 2005	MGR	Daytona Cubs	2014

== See also ==
- Baseball awards#Double-A
