= Joe Justice =

American athlete and coach (1916–2005)

Biographical details
- Born: November 16, 1916; Asheville, North Carolina, U.S.
- Died: July 25, 2005 (aged 88); Fern Park, Florida, U.S.

Playing career

Football
- 1936: Rollins (freshmen)
- 1937–1939: Rollins

Basketball
- ?–1940: Rollins (freshmen)

Baseball
- ?–1940: Rollins
- 1940–1941: Sanford Seminoles
- 1941: Ocala Yearlings
- 1946: Sanford Seminoles
- 1947: Orlando Senators
- Positions: Quarterback (football); Guard (basketball); Second baseman, pitcher (baseball)

Coaching career (HC unless noted)

Football
- 1949: Rollins

Basketball
- 1951–1953: Rollins

Baseball
- 1947–1971: Rollins

Administrative career (AD unless noted)
- 1957–1981: Rollins

Head coaching record
- Overall: 17–22 (basketball); 482–287–13 (baseball)
Medal record
Men's baseball
Representing United States
Baseball World Cup
Bronze medal – third place	1939 Cuba	Team

Joseph Justice Sr. (November 16, 1916 – July 25, 2005) was an American football, basketball, and baseball player and coach. Justice played on the United States national team at the 1939 Amateur World Series in Havana. He served as the head baseball coach at Rollins from 1947 to 1971, leading the Tars to the 1954 College World Series becoming the smallest school in NCAA history to do so. Justice was also the head football coach at Rollins College in 1949.

A native of Asheville, North Carolina, Justice attended Asheville High School. He was the older brother of Charlie Justice, who played college football at University of North Carolina at Chapel Hill and professionally in the National Football League (NFL) with the Washington Redskins. Just died on July 25, 2005, at his home in Fern Park, Florida, after suffering from Parkinson's disease.
