= Miami Hustlers =

Defunct Florida minor league baseball team

The Miami Hustlers were a Minor League Baseball team of the Florida State League in 1927–28. This was made possible by W. B. Kirby, the former president of the Bradenton Growers who turned the Bradenton franchise over to Miami as his investment in the new club.

The Orlando Colts defeated the Hustlers 4 games to 3 to win the 1927 Florida State League Championship.
