= Dale Alexander =

American baseball player (1903–1979)

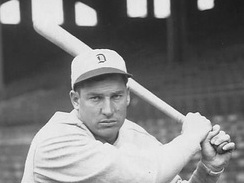
- Alexander, circa 1929
- First baseman
- Born: April 26, 1903; Greeneville, Tennessee, U.S.
- Died: March 2, 1979 (aged 75); Greeneville, Tennessee, U.S.
- Batted: Right Threw: Right

MLB debut
- April 16, 1929, for the Detroit Tigers

Last MLB appearance
- September 23, 1933, for the Boston Red Sox

MLB statistics
- Batting average: .331
- Home runs: 61
- Runs batted in: 459
- Stats at Baseball Reference

Teams
- Detroit Tigers (1929–1932); Boston Red Sox (1932–1933)

Career highlights and awards
- AL batting champion (1932)

David Dale Alexander (April 26, 1903 – March 2, 1979), nicknamed "Moose", was an American baseball player and manager.

A native of Greeneville, Tennessee, Alexander played professional baseball, principally as a first baseman, for 20 years from 1923 to 1942, including five years in Major League Baseball with the Detroit Tigers (1929–1932) and Boston Red Sox (1932–1933). At six feet, three inches and 210 pounds, he was one of the American League's best hitters from 1929 to 1932. He led the American League with 215 hits as a rookie in 1929, totaled 272 RBIs in his first two major league seasons, and won the major league batting title in 1932 with a .367 batting average. In five major league seasons, he compiled a .331 batting average with 811 hits, 61 home runs and 459 RBIs. Never an outstanding fielder, he also led the American League in errors in 1929, and led the major leagues in errors in 1930 at first base.

In May 1933, Alexander sustained third degree burns on his leg and later developed gangrene after being given diathermy treatment for a twisted knee. The burns and infection limited his mobility and effectively ended his major league career. He continued to play in the minor leagues until 1942, compiling a .334 batting average with 2,145 hits and 1,171 RBIs in minor league play. He also served as a minor league manager for the Sanford Lookouts (1939), Thomasville Tourists (1940), Selma Cloverleafs (1941), Greeneville Burley Cubs (1942), Knoxville Smokies (1946–1948), and Jacksonville Tars (1950). He also served as a scout for the New York Giants and Milwaukee Braves in the 1950s and 1960s.

== Early years ==
Alexander was born in Greeneville, Tennessee, in 1903. He was raised on a family farm that had been in his family since the 18th century. He attended Milligan College where he was an outstanding end and punter on the school's football team. He also played basketball and baseball at Milligan and later played baseball for Tusculum College.

== Professional baseball ==
=== Minor leagues ===
Alexander began playing professional baseball for his hometown team, the Greeneville Burley Cubs of the Appalachian League, in 1923 and 1924. In 1924, he compiled a .332 batting average with 28 doubles and 10 triples in 114 games. He moved on to the Charlotte Hornets of the South Atlantic League, batting .331 in 1925 and .323 in 1926.

Alexander next played for the Toronto Maple Leafs of the International League. In 1927, he compiled a .338 batting average with 26 doubles, 11 triples and 12 home runs and 97 RBIs. The next year, he won the International League triple crown with a .380 batting average, 31 home runs, and 144 runs batted in. After his 1929 season, expectations for Alexander were high, with some writers comparing him to Babe Ruth.

=== Detroit Tigers ===
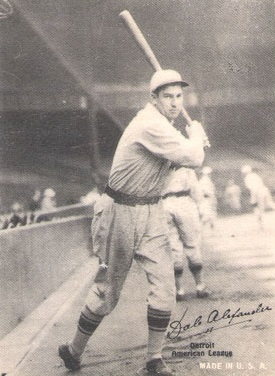
A trading card of Alexander from 1929.

On December 5, 1928, the Detroit Tigers purchased Alexander and pitcher Augie Prudhomme from Toronto for $100,000 cash and three players to be named later. In 1929, Alexander won the first base job with the Tigers, starting 155 games at the position. He compiled a .343 batting average, scored 110 runs, and led the American League with 215 hits. He also ranked among the American League leaders with 83 extra base hits (second), 363 total bases (second), 137 RBIs (third), 25 home runs (fifth), a .580 slugging percentage (fifth), 43 doubles (fifth), and 15 triples (fourth). After a tremendous rookie season, comparisons to Babe Ruth continued with one writer even dubbing him the "Prince of Swat".

In 1930, Alexander started 154 games at first base for the Tigers and compiled a .326 batting average with 20 home runs and 135 RBIs. In his first two major league seasons, Alexander had 272 RBIs. The only player with more RBIs in his first two major league seasons was Joe DiMaggio in 1936 and 1937. Alexander also had the longest hitting streak of the 1930 season, a 29-game streak in which he had 41 hits in 121 at bats. He led the league in fielding errors in each of his first two seasons, but Alexander's exceptional hitting ensured he remained in the Tigers lineup on a daily basis.

In 1931, Alexander appeared in 135 games, including 125 games as the Tigers' starting first baseman and four as a starter in left field. He compiled a stunning .490 batting average in the first two weeks of the season. He then had "a long layoff" in May and June after a spike injury became infected. His batting average dipped to .325 by the end of the season. Though his numbers were less impressive than in his first two seasons with the club, he compiled a .325 batting average, a .401 on-base percentage, and 87 RBIs.

In 1932, Alexander lost his job as the Tigers' starting first baseman as Harry "Stinky" Davis took over the post. During the first two months of the 1932 season, Alexander was used principally as a pinch-hitter and compiled a .250 average in 22 plate appearances in 23 games.

=== Boston Red Sox ===
On June 13, 1932, the Tigers traded Alexander with Roy Johnson to the Boston Red Sox, in exchange for Earl Webb, who had set a major league record with 67 doubles in 1931. Webb hit only 19 doubles for the Tigers in 1932 and retired one year later. Alexander won the American League batting crown with a .367 batting average in 1932. He beat Jimmie Foxx by a mere three points, depriving Foxx of the triple crown. Alexander was the first of only two major league batting champions to be traded to another team in the same league during the season in which he won the title, the second being Harry "The Hat" Walker, who won the National League batting title in 1947, after being traded from the St. Louis Cardinals to the Philadelphia Phillies, three weeks into the 1947 season. (In 1990, Willie McGee won the National League batting title despite being traded to the American League in late August). On August 6, 1932, Alexander broke up a no-hitter by Cleveland pitcher Wes Ferrell, who ended up with a one-hitter.

On May 30, 1933, Alexander twisted a knee in a game at Philadelphia. He was given diathermy treatment ("electrically induced heat" used for muscle relaxation) in the clubhouse by Red Sox trainer Doc Woods. Alexander's leg suffered third degree burns during the treatment, and gangrene eventually set in. "It was a new method of treatment and not too much was known about it", Alexander said, years later. "I noticed my leg felt awfully hot. I ended up with third-degree burns and a gangrene infection and almost lost my leg. I was finished in the Majors... I couldn't run and I couldn't field and when I got hurt, that was the end."

Alexander attempted a comeback but injured his leg again in July 1933 and saw limited action for the rest of the season, mostly as a pinch hitter. Alexander wound up hitting .281 in 1933 and played his last major league game on September 23, 1933, against the New York Yankees.

=== Later career ===
==== Minor league player ====
After 1933, Alexander's mobility and fielding suffered, but he was able to hit well enough to continue playing in the minor leagues, primarily as a first baseman, until 1942. Alexander's return to the minor leagues began in February 1934 when the Red Sox assigned him to the Jersey City Skeeters. The following month, he signed a contract to play for the Newark Bears in the International League. During the 1934 season, he appeared in 134 games for Newark, principally as a first baseman, and hit .336 with 123 RBIs, 14 home runs, 35 doubles, and seven stolen bases.

On November 3, 1934, the Newark club sold Alexander to the Kansas City Blues of the American Association for a price that was reported to be "one of the highest ever paid by an American Association club." He became the Blues' starting first baseman, appearing in 120 games in 1935. He compiled a .358 batting average in 1935 and set a new American Association record by hitting four home runs in a game against Minneapolis on June 14, 1935. In 1936, he appeared in 154 games for the Blues, including 153 at first base, and compiled a .315 batting average with 100 RBIs.

In December 1936, the Kansas City club sold Alexander to the Nashville Volunteers of the Southern Association. During the 1937 season, he appeared in 153 games for Nashville, 153 at first base, and compiled a .319 batting average with 109 RBIs.

On February 19, 1938, Alexander signed with the Chattanooga Lookouts of the Southern Association. He appeared in 140 games for Chattanooga, 137 at first base, and compiled a .309 batting average with 85 RBIs.

==== Minor league player-manager ====
In February 1939, Alexander, at age 36, was hired as player-manager for the Sanford Lookouts in the Florida State League. Alexander appeared in 98 games as a player, 96 as a first baseman, and compiled a .345 batting average with 80 RBIs and 14 stolen bases. He had the highest batting average on the Sanford team and led the team to a 98–35 record and a Florida State League championship.

He then spent the 1940 season as a player-manager for the Thomasville Tourists in the Georgia-Florida League. He compiled a .388 batting average in 91 games and 330 at bats for Thomasville.

In 1941, Alexander was hired as a player-manager for the Selma Cloverleafs of the Southeastern League. He compiled a career-high .438 batting average in 56 games, principally as a pinch-hitter, for the Cloverleafs.

In 1942, he returned to the Greeneville Burley Cubs, the hometown team with which he began his career in 1923. He served as a player-manager for Greeneville during the 1942 season. In his final season as a player, Alexander compiled a .158 batting average in 19 at bats.

During his minor league playing career, Alexander never hit under .300 until 1942, his final year as a professional baseball player. His minor league batting average was .334 with 2,145 hits and 1,171 RBIs. While serving as manager of the Greeneville club, he also ran an unsuccessful campaign to be elected as the sheriff of Greene County, Tennessee.

==== Tobacco farmer, manager and scout ====
Alexander was not associated with professional baseball from 1943 to 1945, instead operating a tobacco farm in his hometown of Greeneville, Tennessee.

He returned to coaching with the Knoxville Smokies from 1946 to 1948. He resigned his position with the Knoxville club on June 5, 1948.

After resigning from Knoxville and continuing through the 1949 season, Alexander served as a scout for the New York Giants covering the states of Kentucky and Tennessee. He was assigned by the Giants in July 1948 to manage the Bristol Twins.

In June 1950, Alexander was hired to take over mid-season as the manager of the last-place Jacksonville Tars in the South Atlantic League.

After retiring as a manager in 1950, Alexander returned to his job as a scout for the New York Giants. He continued as a scout for the Giants for 13 years from 1951 to 1962. He has been credited with signing infielder Ernie Bowman, a native of Johnson City, Tennessee, pitcher Jim Constable, a native of Jonesborough, Tennessee, first baseman Gail Harris, a native of Abingdon, Virginia, and pitcher Joe Shipley, a native of Morristown, Tennessee. He has also been credited with spotting Willie McCovey who grew up in Mobile, Alabama, and began playing in the Georgia State League. In November 1962, he was hired as a scout for the Milwaukee Braves with responsibility for Tennessee, northern Alabama, and southwestern Virginia.

== Family and later years ==
In the winter between the 1931 and 1932 seasons, Alexander married Verna Hutton from his hometown of Greeneville, Tennessee. He had two sons, Don and Steve, both of whom played baseball. He was diagnosed with prostate cancer in 1970, and died in 1979 at Greeneville, Tennessee, at age 75.

== See also ==
- List of Major League Baseball batting champions
