= Jumbo Brown =

American baseball player (1907–1966)

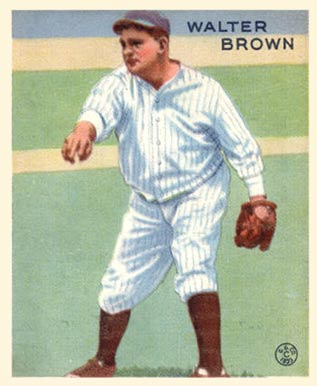
- Pitcher
- Born: April 30, 1907; Greene, Rhode Island, U.S.
- Died: October 2, 1966 (aged 59); Freeport, New York, U.S.
- Batted: Right Threw: Right

MLB debut
- August 26, 1925, for the Chicago Cubs

Last MLB appearance
- August 27, 1941, for the New York Giants

MLB statistics
- Win–loss record: 33–31
- Earned run average: 4.07
- Strikeouts: 301
- Stats at Baseball Reference

Teams
- Chicago Cubs (1925); Cleveland Indians (1927–1928); New York Yankees (1932–1933, 1935–1936); Cincinnati Reds (1937); New York Giants (1937–1941)

Career highlights and awards
- 2× World Series champion (1932, 1936)

Walter George "Jumbo" Brown (April 30, 1907 – October 2, 1966) was an American professional baseball pitcher who played in Major League Baseball for the Chicago Cubs, Cleveland Indians, New York Yankees, Cincinnati Reds, and New York Giants. His professional career spanned from 1925 to 1941.

During his major league career, Brown had a 33–31 win–loss record with a 4.07 earned run average and 29 saves, leading the National League twice. He is known mostly for his large size, weighing 295 pounds (134 kg) during his playing days. Until Walter Young and Jonathan Broxton made their MLB debuts, Brown was the heaviest player to ever play in the major leagues.

== Career ==
Brown was born in Greene, Rhode Island, on April 30, 1907. He began playing sandlot ball in Brockton, Massachusetts, where he was discovered by a scout for the Chicago Cubs, who signed him. Manager Rabbit Maranville was particularly interested in the scout's report. Brown made two appearances for the Cubs on a trial basis, playing his first game on August 26, 1925. Maranville quit as manager, and the new manager, George Gibson, released Brown before the end of the 1925 season. Brown went to the minor leagues in 1926, playing for the Sarasota Gulls of the Class D Florida State League. He started the 1927 season with the Gulfport Tarpons of the Class D Cotton States League. In July, he was traded to the Cleveland Indians for Benn Karr. He appeared in eight games for Cleveland, pitching to a 6.27 ERA. Brown had his tonsils removed during the 1927–28 offseason, causing him to gain 68 pounds (31 kg). His weight continued to fluctuate throughout his career, reaching a reported high of 295 pounds (134 kg).

Cleveland retained Brown's rights for the 1928 season, but he started the season with a 6.75 ERA in five appearances. Cleveland optioned him to the New Orleans Pelicans of the Southern Association in June. In July 1928, he was sent to the Omaha Crickets of the Western League for Luther Harvel. Brown was promoted back to Cleveland in September 1928. He pitched for Omaha in 1929 and the Oklahoma City Indians in 1930. He had a 16–6 win–loss record for Oklahoma City.

The New York Yankees purchased Brown's contract before the 1931 season and assigned him to the Jersey City Skeeters of the International League. Brown played for the Yankees in the 1932 season. He played as a relief pitcher, but made three starts late in the season. Brown had a 4.53 ERA in 19 games, including three starts. Brown was a member of the Yankees roster for the 1932 World Series. He did not appear in the series, which the Yankees won. Brown pitched for the Yankees in 1933, recording a 5.23 ERA in 21 games, eight starts. The Yankees optioned Brown to the Hollywood Stars of the Pacific Coast League at the end of August. He opted to retire for the season to be with his sick wife instead. The Yankees optioned Brown to the Newark Bears of the International League before the 1934 season. He had a 20–6 win–loss record for Newark. The Yankees promoted Brown back to the major leagues in 1935, Brown recorded a 3.61 ERA in 20 games, eight starts, in the 1935 season and pitched to a 5.91 ERA in 20 games, with three starts during the 1936 season. Brown was included on the Yankees roster for the 1936 World Series, but did not appear in the series, which the Yankees won.

In May 1937, the Yankees sent Brown and Babe Dahlgren to the Bears. In June 1937, he was purchased by the Cincinnati Reds. Brown won his first game with the Reds, but ended up with a 8.38 ERA in four games. The Reds sold Brown and Phil Weintraub to Jersey City, then owned by the New York Giants, in July. In September, the Giants purchased Brown from Jersey City. He made four appearances with a 1.04 ERA.

The Giants retained Brown for the 1938 season. Using Brown exclusively as a relief pitcher, he had a 1.80 ERA with five saves in 43 games in 1938, a 4.15 ERA with six saves in 31 games in 1939, a 3.42 ERA with seven saves in 41 games in 1940, and a 3.32 ERA with eight saves in 31 appearances in 1941. He led the National League in saves in 1940 and 1941. In September 1941, the Giants released Brown to the Columbus Red Birds of the American Association, a farm team of the St. Louis Cardinals, in order to acquire Tom Sunkel from a different Cardinals' farm team. Brown reported to spring training with Columbus in March 1942, but retired from professional baseball in April. He finished his career with a 33–31 won-lost record, a 4.07 ERA, and 28 saves at the major league level.

== Later life ==
After his playing career, Brown settled in Freeport, New York. During World War II, he worked for Grumman at their Bethpage, New York, facility. He also pitched for Grumman's semi-professional baseball team. After the war, Brown opened a sporting goods store in Freeport. It went out of business in 1953.

Brown and his first wife, Martha Kobe, had one daughter Faith Emmaline. He met his second wife when he played for the Giants and she worked as a nurse at the Polo Grounds. They married on February 2, 1940, and had one daughter.

In his later life, Brown spent time living in Providence, Rhode Island, before returning to Freeport. Brown died on October 2, 1966, from congestive heart failure.

== See also ==
- List of Major League Baseball annual saves leaders
