= West Palm Beach (disambiguation) =

West Palm Beach is a city in (and the county seat of) Palm Beach County, Florida, United States.

West Palm Beach may also refer to one of the following, each located in, or associated with, the Florida city:

== Sports ==
- West Palm Beach Barracudas, a defunct minor-league ice hockey team (1992–1996)
- West Palm Beach Braves, a defunct minor-league baseball team (1965–1968)
- West Palm Beach Expos, a defunct minor-league baseball team (1969–1997)
- West Palm Beach Indians, a defunct minor-league baseball team (1940–1956)
- West Palm Beach Sheriffs, a defunct minor-league baseball team (1928)
- West Palm Beach Street Circuit, a former sports car racing circuit (1986–1991)
- West Palm Beach Tropics, a team that completed in the Senior Professional Baseball Association (1989–1990)

== Transportation ==
- West Palm Beach Airport, alternate name for Palm Beach International Airport (officially President Donald J. Trump International Airport)
- West Palm Beach station, a train station served by Amtrak passenger rail and Tri-Rail commuter rail
- West Palm Beach station (Brightline), a train station served by Brightline, an intercity rail route

== See also ==
- Palm Beach (disambiguation)
