= Palm Beach Airport (disambiguation) =

Palm Beach Airport most commonly refers to President Donald J. Trump International Airport, formerly known as Palm Beach International Airport, a public airport adjacent to West Palm Beach, Florida.

Palm Beach Airport may also refer to:

== Australia ==
- Palm Beach Water Airport, a water aerodrome located in Sydney, New South Wales

== United States ==
Each located in Palm Beach County, Florida

- North Palm Beach County General Aviation Airport, a non-towered general aviation airport located northwest of West Palm Beach
- Palm Beach County Glades Airport, a public-use airport located west of West Palm Beach
- Palm Beach County Park Airport, a public-use airport located south of West Palm Beach

== See also ==
- Palm Beach (disambiguation)
