= Ninth Street Park (pre-1923) =

- Interactive map of Ninth Street Park
- Location: 1611 9th Street; Bradenton, FL 34205; United States
- Coordinates: 27°29′9″N 82°34′13″W
- Owner: City of Bradenton
- Operator: City of Bradenton
- Surface: Grass

Construction
- Demolished: 1923

Tenant
- Bradenton Growers (FSL) (1919-22)

Ninth Street Park was a baseball park located in Bradenton, Florida, located where LECOM Park stands today. The park was the home field of the Class-D Bradenton Growers of the Florida State League from 1919 to 1922.

In 1923, the St. Louis Cardinals were to travel to Bradenton for spring training. They soon discovered that the second base position, at Ninth Street Park, was 14 inches (36 cm) lower than home plate, and the outfield was even 2 feet (0.61 m) lower than second base. In a joint venture between the Cardinals and the city, the ball field, which would later become McKechnie Field, was constructed with a grandstand and bleachers for $2,000.

Events and tenants
Preceded by Franchise created	Home of the Bradenton Growers; 1919–1922	Succeeded by McKechnie Field
