= Palm Beach =

Palm Beach may refer to:

== Places ==
=== Australia ===
- Palm Beach, New South Wales, a suburb of Sydney
- Palm Beach, Queensland, on the Gold Coast

=== United States ===
- Palm Beach, Florida
  - West Palm Beach, Florida
  - Palm Beach County, Florida
  - Palm Beach Hotel (Palm Beach, Florida)
  - President Donald J. Trump International Airport, formerly Palm Beach International Airport
  - Palm Beach Opera
- Palm Beach, Illinois
- Palm Beach, an artificial beach at Moody Gardens Resort, Galveston, Texas

=== Other countries ===
- Palm Beach, Aruba
- Palm Beach, Oro-Medonte, Ontario, Canada
- Palm Beach, New Zealand, Waiheke Island, New Zealand
- Palm Beach, KwaZulu-Natal, South Africa

== Other uses ==
- Palm Beach (1980 film), an Australian drama film
- Palm Beach (2019 film), an Australian comedy-drama film

== See also ==
- Palm Beach Airport (disambiguation)
- Palm Coast, Florida
- West Palm Beach (disambiguation)
