= Sarasota Gulls =

- 1926–1927; Sarasota, Florida

Minor league affiliations
- Previous classes: Class D
- League: Florida State League

Team data
- Previous names: Sarasota Tarpons (1927); Sarasota Gulls (1926)

The Sarasota Gulls were a minor league baseball team, based in Sarasota, Florida, as a member of the early Florida State League. The team played in 1926 as the Gulls, however the following season they played as the Sarasota Tarpons. They were the first team to represent Sarasota in the Florida State League. The city would not host another FSL team until the Sarasota Sun Sox arrived in 1961. The team folded in 1928, when the FSL went on a hiatus.

== Notable players ==
- Jumbo Brown
- Ivy Olson
