= DeLand Sun Caps =

- 1970; DeLand, Florida

Minor league affiliations
- Previous classes: Class A
- League: Florida State League

Team data
- Previous parks: Conrad Park

The DeLand Sun Caps were a minor league baseball team, based in DeLand, Florida, as a member of the Florida State League for one season in 1970. They were the last team to represent DeLand in the Florida State League. Prior to 1970 the city did not host another FSL team since the DeLand Red Hats left in 1954.
