= Bradenton Growers =

- 1919–1926; (1919–1920, 1923–1924, 1926); Bradenton, Florida

Minor league affiliations
- Previous classes: Class D (1919–1920, 1926); Class C (1923–1924)
- League: Florida State League

Team data
- Colors: Green, white
- Previous parks: City Park (1923–1924, 1926); Ninth Street Park (1919–1920)

The Bradenton Growers were a professional baseball team based in Bradenton, Florida. A charter member of the Florida State League, they played from 1919 to 1926. The ballclub was founded by team president and majority owner Robert M. Beall, Sr., founder of the department store Bealls. The Growers originally played their home games at Ninth Street Park and moved into McKechnie Field, then known as City Park, when it was constructed in 1923.

== Notable players ==
Many of the Growers rosters include players' names with question marks, last names only, and no dates of birth or hometowns. However, several notable Growers did make it into the majors. Logan Drake played from 1922-1924 as a relief pitcher for the Cleveland Indians. Walter Cleveland "Lefty" Stewart played 10 seasons in the majors for the Detroit Tigers, St. Louis Browns, Washington Senators, and Cleveland Indians. He also pitched in game 1 of the 1933 World Series for the Senators. Another Grower, Gene Elliott, played for New York Highlanders in 1911 before playing in Bradenton. Hank Johnson, a Bradenton native, also played for the Growers in 1925. He would go on to win the 1928 World Series, as a member of the New York Yankees. Other major leaguers include Joe Buskey and Al Niehaus, Mike Kelly and Dixie Parker.

== Uniforms ==
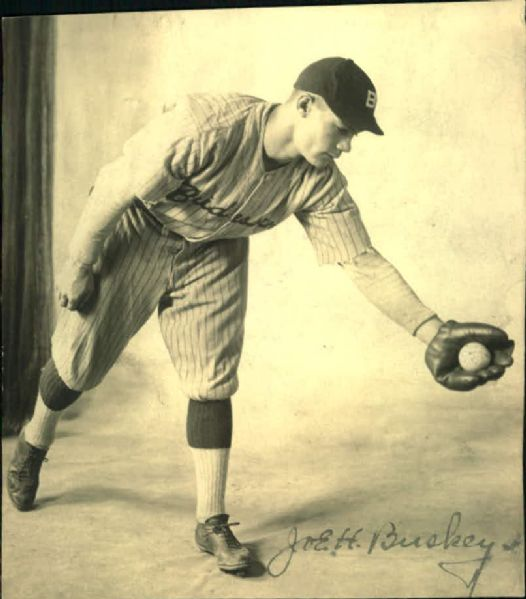
Joe Buskey in 1923 for the Growers

The Growers wore short-billed caps and their white uniforms bore an elegant B over their hearts. While the primary color of the Growers' uniforms is not known, baseball historians from the Manatee Adult Baseball League believe the color of the uniforms was green and that their design was based the design on the uniforms worn by the 1919 University of Miami baseball team.

== Legacy ==
In 1919, Bradenton became a charter member of the six-team, Class D level Florida State League. The Bradenton Growers joined the Bartow Polkers, Lakeland Highlanders, Orlando Caps, Sanford Celeryfeds and Tampa Smokers teams as the Florida State League charter members.

The Growers would be the last Florida State League team based in Bradenton. The city would not be home to another FSL team for the next 84 years. Finally on April 8, 2010, the Bradenton Marauders, the High-A affiliate of the Pittsburgh Pirates, began play at McKechnie Field. On June 28, 2009, members of the Manatee Adult Baseball League, dressed in Growers uniforms for a game at Tropicana Field following a between the Tampa Bay Rays and Florida Marlins. On May 31, 2012, the Bradenton Marauders dressed in Growers uniforms during a 2–1 win over the Fort Myers Miracle for Turn Back the Clock Night at McKechnie Field.

== Season-by-season ==
Year	Record	Finish	Manager	Playoffs/Notes
1919	34–43	4th	Jim Moore	No playoffs held
1920	57–44	2nd	Frank Larisey / Webb Cashion	No playoffs held
1923	63–55	2nd	Roy Thomas	Team moved from Jacksonville mid-season
1924	47–55	4th	Gene Elliott	No playoffs held
1926	44–76	7th	Frank Larisey / Dixie Parker	Did not qualify
