= Winter Haven Red Sox =

- 1966–1992; (1966-1967, 1969-1992); Winter Haven, Florida

Minor league affiliations
- Class: Class A-Advanced (1990-1992); Class A (1966-1989)
- League: Florida State League

Major league affiliations
- Team: Boston Red Sox (1969-1994); New York Mets (1967); Chicago White Sox (1966)

Minor league titles
- League titles (1): 1979

Team data
- Name: Winter Haven Red Sox (1969-1992); Winter Haven Mets (1967); Winter Haven Sun Sox (1966); Deerfield Beach Sun Sox (1966)
- Ballpark: Chain of Lakes Park

The Winter Haven Red Sox were a minor league baseball team in the Florida State League (FSL), based in Winter Haven, Florida, from 1969–1992.

== Team history ==
The franchise began in 1966 in Deerfield Beach, Florida, as the Deerfield Beach Sun Sox, a Class-A affiliate of the Chicago White Sox. However, on June 27, 1966, the team moved to Winter Haven becoming the Winter Haven Sun Sox. It was the city's first entry in Organized Baseball since the 1919 Bartow Polkers played part of their home schedule in Winter Haven. The Sun Sox were managed by Don Bacon and Bruce Andrew and had a 55–83 record overall.

In 1967, the Sun Sox were renamed the Winter Haven Mets after their new parent club, the New York Mets. The Mets posted a stellar 94–46 record, but were defeated by the St. Petersburg Cardinals for the western division title by two and a half games. Nolan Ryan, then 20, pitched for the 1967 team, appearing in one game as a starting pitcher and allowing one hit and one earned run in four innings pitched, with five strikeouts. It was Ryan's last year in the minors before he began his Baseball Hall of Fame big-league career.

The Mets left Winter Haven after only a single season, then the franchise lay dormant during 1968. In 1969, the Boston Red Sox, who had established their spring training home in Winter Haven in 1966, took over the Florida State League franchise. The Winter Haven Red Sox then played for the next 24 consecutive seasons. In 1983, 16 years after Ryan's one-game stint, Roger Clemens began his pro career with Winter Haven, winning three of four decisions in four starts, and striking out 36 in 29 innings pitched.

The Winter Haven Red Sox effectively folded after the 1992 season, when, after 27 years, the parent Red Sox moved their spring headquarters to Fort Myers and their FSL affiliate to Fort Lauderdale. Although the Cleveland Indians replaced the Red Sox as Winter Haven's spring training tenants from 1993 through 2008, they never revived an FSL franchise for the city.

== The ballpark ==
The team played home games at Chain of Lakes Park, located at 500 Cletus Allen Drive. The park still exists as part of the Chain of Lakes Sports Complex.

== Notable alumni ==
=== Baseball Hall of Fame alumni ===
- Jeff Bagwell (1989) Inducted, 2017
- Jim Rice (1972) Inducted, 2009
- Nolan Ryan (1967) Inducted, 1999

=== Notable alumni ===
- Brady Anderson (1986) 3 x MLB All-Star
- Oil Can Boyd (1981)
- Ellis Burks (1984) 2 x MLB All-Star
- Rick Burleson (1970) 4 x MLB All-Star
- Roger Clemens (1983) 1986 AL Most Valuable Player, 7 x Cy Young Award
- Scott Hatteberg (1991)
- Bruce Hurst (1977) MLB All-Star
- Bob Ojeda (1979)
- Ben Oglivie (1969) 1980 AL Home Run Leader
- Paul Quantrill (1990) MLB All-Star
- Ken Singleton (1967) 3 x MLB All-Star
- Bob Stanley (1975, 1988) 2 x MLB All-Star

== Year-by-year record ==
Year	Record	Finish	Manager	Playoffs
1966	55-83	8th	Don Bacon & Bruce Andrew	
1967	94-46	2nd	Pete Pavlick	
1969	76-53	3rd	Rac Slider	
1970	61-71	7th	John K. Butler	
1971	58-79	10th	John K. Butler	
1972	61-70	10th	John K. Butler	
1973	50-94	10th	Al Lehrer	
1974	59-71	6th (t)	Rac Slider	
1975	57-70	5th (t)	Rac Slider	
1976	65-76	6th	Rac Slider	
1977	70-66	5th	Rac Slider	
1978	82-56	2nd	Rac Slider	
1979	79-58	2nd	Rac Slider	League Champs
1980	60-80	10th	Rac Slider	
1981	62-77	9th	Rac Slider	
1982	59-74	8th	Tom Kotchman	
1983	49-83	9th	Tom Kotchman	
1984	70-74	8th	Dave Holt	
1985	71-68	7th	Dave Holt	
1986	80-47	2nd	Dave Holt	Lost in 1st round
1987	67-71	8th	Doug Camilli	
1988	45-94	14th	Doug Camilli	
1989	52-87	13th	Dave Holt	
1990	40-94	14th	Dave Holt	
1991	43-85	14th	Mike Verdi	
1992	51-86	13th	Felix Maldonado	
