= Fern Park, Florida =

- Census-designated place (CDP) & unincorporated community
- Location in Seminole County and the state of Florida
- Coordinates: 28°38′54″N 81°20′45″W
- Country: United States
- State: Florida
- County: Seminole

Area
  - Total: 2.32 sq mi (6.01 km^{2})
  - Land: 2.00 sq mi (5.19 km^{2})
  - Water: 0.32 sq mi (0.82 km^{2})
- Elevation: 85 ft (26 m)

Population (2020)
  - Total: 8,205
  - Density: 4,091.5/sq mi (1,579.73/km^{2})
- Time zone: UTC-5 (Eastern (EST))
  - Summer (DST): UTC-4 (EDT)
- ZIP code: 32730
- Area codes: 407, 689
- FIPS code: 12-22250
- GNIS feature ID: 2402479

Fern Park is a census-designated place and a suburban unincorporated community in Seminole County, Florida, United States. As of the 2020 census, Fern Park had a population of 8,205. It is part of the Orlando–Kissimmee Metropolitan Statistical Area.

== Geography ==
According to the United States Census Bureau, the CDP has a total area of 2.3 square miles (6.0 km^{2}), of which 2.0 square miles (5.2 km^{2}) is land and 0.3 square miles (0.78 km^{2}) (12.39%) is water.

== Demographics ==
Historical population
Census	Pop.	Note	%±
1980	8,890		—
1990	8,294		−6.7%
2000	8,318		0.3%
2020	8,205		—

=== 2020 census ===
As of the 2020 census, Fern Park had a population of 8,205. The median age was 41.5 years. 17.5% of residents were under the age of 18 and 19.9% of residents were 65 years of age or older. For every 100 females there were 93.2 males, and for every 100 females age 18 and over there were 90.7 males age 18 and over.

100.0% of residents lived in urban areas, while 0.0% lived in rural areas.

There were 3,544 households in Fern Park, of which 24.8% had children under the age of 18 living in them. Of all households, 40.6% were married-couple households, 19.8% were households with a male householder and no spouse or partner present, and 32.0% were households with a female householder and no spouse or partner present. About 31.7% of all households were made up of individuals and 13.6% had someone living alone who was 65 years of age or older.

There were 3,728 housing units, of which 4.9% were vacant. The homeowner vacancy rate was 1.7% and the rental vacancy rate was 5.8%.

Racial composition as of the 2020 census
Race	Number	Percent
White	5,309	64.7%
Black or African American	862	10.5%
American Indian and Alaska Native	24	0.3%
Asian	199	2.4%
Native Hawaiian and Other Pacific Islander	1	0.0%
Some other race	506	6.2%
Two or more races	1,304	15.9%
Hispanic or Latino (of any race)	1,873	22.8%

=== 2000 census ===
As of the 2000 census, there were 8,318 people, 3,570 households, and 2,227 families residing in the CDP. The population density was 4,055.3 inhabitants per square mile (1,565.8/km^{2}). There were 3,700 housing units at an average density of 1,803.9 per square mile (696.5/km^{2}). The racial makeup of the CDP was 85.14% White, 7.54% African American, 0.42% Native American, 1.54% Asian, 0.01% Pacific Islander, 3.07% from other races, and 2.28% from two or more races. Hispanic or Latino of any race were 12.83% of the population.

There were 3,570 households, out of which 24.1% had children under the age of 18 living with them, 46.0% were married couples living together, 12.4% had a female householder with no husband present, and 37.6% were non-families. 30.3% of all households were made up of individuals, and 13.1% had someone living alone who was 65 years of age or older. The average household size was 2.30 and the average family size was 2.85.

In the CDP, the population was spread out, with 20.3% under the age of 18, 8.4% from 18 to 24, 28.5% from 25 to 44, 24.5% from 45 to 64, and 18.3% who were 65 years of age or older. The median age was 40 years. For every 100 females, there were 91.0 males. For every 100 females age 18 and over, there were 87.5 males.

The median income for a household in the CDP was $43,337, and the median income for a family was $52,981. Males had a median income of $34,152 versus $25,975 for females. The per capita income for the CDP was $23,261. About 4.2% of families and 7.8% of the population were below the poverty line, including 7.7% of those under age 18 and 10.8% of those age 65 or over.

== Schools ==
=== Elementary ===
- English Estates Elementary School
