= Ed Chaplin =

American baseball player (1893–1978)

- Catcher
- Born: September 25, 1893; Pelzer, South Carolina
- Died: August 15, 1978 (aged 84); Sanford, Florida
- Batted: Left Threw: Right

MLB debut
- September 4, 1920, for the Boston Red Sox

Last MLB appearance
- September 30, 1922, for the Boston Red Sox

MLB statistics
- Batting average: .184
- Home runs: 0
- Runs batted in: 7
- Stats at Baseball Reference

Teams
- Boston Red Sox (1920–1922)

Bert Edgar Chaplin [born as Bert Edgar Chapman] (September 25, 1893 – August 15, 1978) was a backup catcher in Major League Baseball. Chaplin batted left-handed and threw right-handed. He was born in Pelzer, South Carolina.

Chaplin was signed by the Boston Red Sox out of the University of South Carolina. He reached the majors in 1920 with the Red Sox, playing for them until 1922. In part of three seasons, he posted a .184 batting average (14-for-76) with seven RBI, 10 runs, two doubles, one triple, and two stolen bases without home runs in 35 games played.

Chaplin died in Sanford, Florida, at the age of 84.
