= Jacksonville Indians =

- 1921–1922; Jacksonville, Florida

Minor league affiliations
- Previous classes: Class-C
- League: Florida State League

Team data
- Previous names: Jacksonville Indians (1922); Jacksonville Scouts (1921)
- Previous parks: Barrs Field

The Jacksonville Indians were a minor league baseball team based in Jacksonville, Florida. They played in the Class-C Florida State League in 1921 and 1922. They were managed by George Stovall. As a 44-year-old, Stovall also played in 65 games for them. In 1921, the team first began play as the Jacksonville Scouts.

== Alumni ==
- Logan Drake
- Al Niehaus
- Paul Schreiber
- Les Sweetland
- Herb Thomas
