= Jack Burns (second baseman) =

American baseball player (1880–1957)

- Second baseman
- Born: May 13, 1880; Avoca, Pennsylvania, U.S.
- Died: June 24, 1957 (aged 77); Waterford, Connecticut, U.S.
- Batted: Right Threw: Right

MLB debut
- September 11, 1903, for the Detroit Tigers

Last MLB appearance
- April 22, 1904, for the Detroit Tigers

MLB statistics
- Batting average: .226
- Home runs: 0
- Hits: 4
- Stats at Baseball Reference

Teams
- Detroit Tigers (1903–1904)

John Joseph Burns (May 13, 1880 – June 24, 1957) was an American second baseman who played two seasons in Major League Baseball (MLB) with the Detroit Tigers. He played in the minors through 1911 and had three stints as a manager in the minors, in 1904, 1913 and 1920.

== Sources ==
- Career statistics from Baseball Reference, or Baseball Reference (Minors)
