= Bill Rodgers (infielder) =

American baseball player (1887–1978)

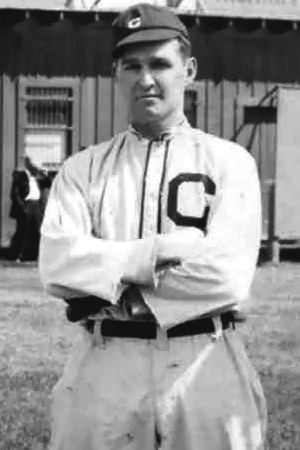
- Second baseman
- Born: April 18, 1887; Pleasant Ridge, Ohio, U.S.
- Died: December 24, 1978 (aged 91); Goliad, Texas, U.S.
- Batted: Left Threw: Right

MLB debut
- April 15, 1915, for the Cleveland Indians

Last MLB appearance
- May 13, 1916, for the Cincinnati Reds

MLB statistics
- Batting average: .243
- Home runs: 0
- Runs batted in: 19
- Stats at Baseball Reference

Teams
- Cleveland Indians (1915); Boston Red Sox (1915); Cincinnati Reds (1915–16)

Wilbur Kincaid Rodgers, nicknamed "Rawmeat Bill," (April 18, 1887 – December 24, 1978) was an American backup infielder in Major League Baseball, playing mainly as a second baseman from 1915 through 1916 for the Cleveland Indians (1915), Boston Red Sox (1915) and Cincinnati Reds (1915–1916). Listed at 5 ft 9.5 in (1.77 m), 170 lb., Rodgers batted left-handed and threw right-handed. He was born in Pleasant Ridge, Ohio.

In a two-season career, Rodgers was a .243 hitter (65-for-268) with 30 run and 19 RBI in 102 games, including 15 doubles, four triples, 11 stolen bases, and a .316 on-base percentage without home runs. In 83 fielding appearances at second base (75), shortstop (7) and third base, he posted a collective .947 fielding percentage (20 errors in 376 chances).

He also was a player/manager in the Minor leagues during 22 seasons between 1918 and 1951, and managed the Peoria Redwings of the All-American Girls Professional Baseball League during the 1946 season.

Rodgers died at the age of 91 in Goliad, Texas.
