= Ed Levy =

American baseball player (1916-2008)

- Left fielder / First baseman
- Born: October 28, 1916; Birmingham, Alabama, U.S.
- Died: October 27, 2008 (aged 91); Titusville, Florida, U.S.
- Batted: Right Threw: Right

MLB debut
- April 16, 1940, for the Philadelphia Phillies

Last MLB appearance
- June 17, 1944, for the New York Yankees

MLB statistics
- Batting average: .215
- Home runs: 4
- Runs batted in: 32

Teams
- Philadelphia Phillies (1940); New York Yankees (1942, 1944)

Edward Clarence Levy (né Whitner; October 28, 1916 – October 27, 2008) was a left fielder/first baseman in Major League Baseball who played between 1940 and 1944 for the Philadelphia Phillies (1940) and New York Yankees (1942, 1944). Listed at 6' 5.5", 190 lb., he batted and threw right-handed. Ed attended Rollins college in Winter Park, FL where he studied history graduated. Ed was married to Katherine Porcher Whitner on January 25th. He was the father of two girls and a boy( Edward, Porcher Whitner, Katherine Whitner Newlin, Nananne W Clark). The grandfather of 6 girls (Jacqueline Whitner, Amber Whitner, Kathrine Clark, Missy Standifer, Katherine “Becky” Newlin, and Jennifer Newlin) with 4 grand sons (Glen Whitner, Case Whitner, Jason Clark, and great grandsons Phoenix Whitner, Conner Jones, Brent Tucker, Caleb Standifer, and Noah Standifer).

A native of Birmingham, Alabama, Levy was one of many major leaguers who saw his baseball career interrupted by World War II: he served in the US Coast Guard. He played parts of three seasons: he appeared in just one game in 1940 for the Philadelphia Phillies and subsequently joined the New York Yankees for two brief stints in April 1942 and April through June, 1944. He appeared in the opening day starting lineup both years. He posted a .215 batting average (42–for–195) with four home runs and 32 RBI in 54 games played, including 17 runs, 11 doubles, two triples, and two stolen bases. As a fielder, he appeared in 36 games at left field and 13 on first base. In June 1944, he was traded to a minor league team, the American Association's Milwaukee Brewers and he never returned to the majors.

In his later years he was an avid golfer as a Senior Pro, playing into his late years until he was 91.
