= Sanford Greyhounds =

- 1959–1960; (1948–1953, 1955, 1959–1960); Sanford, Florida

Minor league affiliations
- Previous classes: Class D
- League: Florida State League

Major league affiliations
- Previous teams: Kansas City Athletics (1960); Washington Senators (1959); St. Louis Cardinals (1953, 1955); New York Giants (1948–1951)

Minor league titles
- League titles: None

Team data
- Previous names: Sanford Greyhounds (1959–1960); Sanford Cardinals (1953, 1955); Sanford Seminole Blues (1952); Sanford Giants (1948–1950)

Sanford Greyhounds were a professional minor league baseball team that played periodically from in 1959 and 1960. Throughout its entire existence the Sanford teams played in the then-Class D level Florida State League. Sanford was a charter member of the league in 1919.

Originally the Sanford Celeryfeds, in honor of the city's dominant crop – celery, the team's name changed several times over the years. The team was previously known also as the Sanford Lookouts, Sanford Seminoles, Sanford Giants, Sanford Seminole BLues, Seminole Cardinals and the Sanford Greyhounds.

The 1939 Lookouts were recognized as one of the 100 greatest minor league teams of all time.

== Notable alumni ==
- Dick Green (1960)
- Ken Harrelson (1960) MLB All-Star
