= West Palm Beach Sheriffs =

- 1928; West Palm Beach, Florida

Minor league affiliations
- Previous classes: Class D
- League: Florida State League

The West Palm Beach Sheriffs were a minor league baseball team, based in West Palm Beach, Florida, as a member of the early Florida State League in 1928. They were the first team to represent West Palm Beach inside of Florida State League. The city would not host another FSL team until the West Palm Beach Indians arrived in 1940. The team folded in 1928, when the FSL went on a hiatus.
