= Charlotte Rangers =

- 1987–2002; Port Charlotte, Florida
Team logo
Cap insignia

Minor league affiliations
- Class: Class A-Advanced (1990-2002); Class A (1987-1989)
- League: Florida State League

Major league affiliations
- Team: Texas Rangers (1987-2002)

Minor league titles
- League titles (2): 1989; 2002

Team data
- Name: Charlotte Rangers (1987-2002)
- Mascot: Pop-Up (1991-2002)
- Ballpark: Charlotte County Stadium

The Charlotte Rangers, based in Port Charlotte, Florida, were an American minor league baseball team that existed from 1987 through 2002. The team played at Charlotte County Stadium as a Class A Florida State League affiliate of the Texas Rangers, who at the time made their spring training base in Port Charlotte.

During their 16-year history, the Charlotte Rangers won two FSL championships (1989 and 2002) and sent players such as Juan González, Iván Rodríguez, Kenny Rogers, Kevin Brown and Carlos Peña to Major League Baseball.

When the parent Rangers moved their spring training operation to Arizona in 2003, the Charlotte franchise was sold to the St. Louis Cardinals and moved across the state to Jupiter, Florida, where it plays as the Palm Beach Cardinals.

The Charlotte Stone Crabs, FSL affiliate of the Tampa Bay Rays, eventually replaced the Rangers, moving from Vero Beach in 2009.

== Notable alumni ==
=== Baseball Hall of Fame alumni ===
- Ivan Rodriguez (1989) Inducted, 2017

=== Notable alumni ===
- Wilson Alvarez (1989) MLB All-Star
- Rich Aurilia (1992) MLB All-Star
- Joaquin Benoit (1999)
- Hank Blalock (2001) 2 x MLB All-Star
- Brian Bohanon (1989)
- Kevin Brown (1987) 6 x MLB All-Star; 2 x AL ERA Title (1996, 2000)
- Mark Clark (1999)
- Doug Davis (1997-1998)
- R. A. Dickey (1997-1998) MLB All-Star; 2012 NL Cy Young Award
- Juan Gonzalez (1988, 2002) 3 x MLB All-Star; 2 x AL Most Valuable Player (1996, 1998)
- Rusty Greer (1991)
- Tom Goodwin (1999)
- Travis Hafner (2000)
- Aaron Harang (2000)
- Bill Haselman (1988)
- Rick Helling (1992)
- Jose Hernandez (1990) MLB All-Star
- Bruce Hurst (1994) MLB All-Star
- Danny Kolb (2001) MLB All-Star
- Chad Kreuter (1987)
- Mike Lamb (1998)
- Colby Lewis (2000-2001)
- Rob Nen (1990) 3 x MLB All-Star; 2001 NL Saves Leader
- Lance Nix (2001-2002)
- Darren Oliver (1991-1992, 1996)
- Dean Palmer (1988) MLB All-Star
- Roger Pavlik (1989, 1994) MLB All-Star
- Carlos Pena (1998-1999) MLB All-Star
- Kenny Rogers (1987-1988) 4 x MLB All-Star
- Jeff Russell (1987, 1996) 2 x MLB All-Star; 1989 AL Saves Leader
- Rey Sanchez (1988)
- Mike Scioscia (1994) 2 x MLB All-Star; 2 x AL Manager of the Year; Manager: 2002 World Champion Anaheim Angels
- Sammy Sosa (1988) 6 x MLB All-Star; 1998 NL Most Valuable Player
- Fernando Tatis (1996)
- Mark Teixeria (2002) 5 x Gold Glove; 3 x MLB All-Star
- Todd Van Poppel (1997)
- Bump Wills (1992)
- C.J. Wilson (2002) 2 x MLB All-Star
- Butch Wynegar (1995-1997, MGR) 2 x MLB All-Star
- Jeff Zimmerman (1998) MLB All-Star

== See also ==
- Charlotte Stone Crabs
