= Mike Kelly (pitcher) =

American baseball player (1902-1982)

- Pitcher
- Born: November 9, 1902; St. Louis, Missouri
- Died: April 26, 1982 (aged 79); Modesto, California
- Batted: Right Threw: Right

MLB debut
- September 3, 1926, for the Philadelphia Phillies

Last MLB appearance
- September 16, 1926, for the Philadelphia Phillies

MLB statistics
- Win–loss record: 0–0
- Earned run average: 9.45
- Strikeouts: 2
- Stats at Baseball Reference

Teams
- Philadelphia Phillies (1926)

Michael J. Kelly (November 9, 1902 – April 26, 1982) was a Major League Baseball pitcher who played for the Philadelphia Phillies in 1926.
