= Tampa Smokers =

American minor league baseball teams

- 1919–1954; Tampa, Florida
Team logo
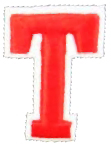
Cap insignia

Minor league affiliations
- Previous classes: Class B (1928-1930, 1949-1954); Class C (1921-1924); Class D (1919-1920, 1925-1927)
- League: Florida International League (1946-1954)
- Previous leagues: West Coast League (1932); Southeastern League (1929-1930); Florida State League (1919-1927)

Major league affiliations
- Previous teams: Independent

Minor league titles
- League titles: 4 (1920, 1925, 1946, 1949)
- Conference titles: 2 (1929, 1951)

Team data
- Previous names: Tampa Krewes (1928)
- Previous parks: Plant Field

The Tampa Smokers was a name used between 1919 and 1954 by a series of minor league baseball teams based in Tampa, Florida. The nickname was a nod to the local cigar industry, which was the most important industry in Tampa during the years in which the Smokers were active. During periods in which the name was not used by a professional team, various local semi-pro and amateur teams took up the Smokers name.

== Team history ==
=== Florida State League / Southeastern League (1919 – 1930) ===
The original Tampa Smokers were a charter franchise of the original Florida State League, which started play in 1919. The name reflected the importance of the cigar industry to the Tampa area.

In 1919, the Tampa Smokers became a charter member of the six-team, Class D level Florida State League. Orlando joined with he Bartow Polkers, Bradenton Growers, Lakeland Highlanders, Orlando Caps and Sanford Celeryfeds teams as the Florida State League charter members.

In 1928, the team was officially known as the Tampa Krewes, a reference to Ye Mystic Krewe of Gasparilla, the organization which organizes the local Gasparilla Pirate Festival. In 1929, the club moved to the Southeastern League and restored the Smokers nickname, but it ceased operations when the league folded following the 1930 season.

=== West Coast Baseball League (1932) ===
In 1932, the Smokers briefly returned as a charter member of the West Coast Baseball League, which was composed of teams based in peninsular Florida. The club disbanded again when the league collapsed after a single season.

=== Florida International League (1946 – 1954) ===
The name was revived professionally in 1946, when the Tampa Smokers became a charter member of the Florida International League, a Class C circuit which was notable for fielding a team in Havana, Cuba. This incarnation of the Smokers became one of the first three racially integrated teams in Florida when they signed Afro-Cuban outfielder Claro Duany in 1952.

The Smokers folded along with the Florida International League after the 1954 season, and the name has not been used professionally since. The importance of the cigar industry to Tampa's economy had waned by the 1950s, so when minor league baseball returned to the city in 1957, the new team was called the "Tampa Tarpons".

=== Semi-pro and amateur baseball ===
During times when there was no professional baseball team known as the Tampa Smokers (such as the early 1900s and the period from the mid-1930s to the mid-1940s), the name was used by various semi-pro and amateur squads, especially local all-star teams composed of the best Tampa-area players.

Alumni of Smokers squads regularly reunited for exhibition games during the 1950s and 1960s, usually against the Tampa Tarpons. These games were played at Al López Field, the Tarpons' home ballpark which was built in 1955 and named after the Smokers' (and Tampa's) most famous baseball figure.

== Ballparks ==
The minor league Smokers played their home games at Plant Field, which was located just across the Hillsborough River from downtown Tampa. Plant Field had been built by Henry B. Plant as part of his Tampa Bay Hotel resort, and the Smokers shared the large multi-use facility with everything from auto racing to the Florida State Fair.

Semi-pro and amateur versions of the Smokers played at smaller ballfields around town, often Cuscaden Park in Ybor City or Macfarlane Park in West Tampa.

== Players ==
In all their incarnations, the Tampa Smokers featured many local ballplayers, including many Latin players from Ybor City and West Tampa, and usually had strong community support. Their most famous alumnus was Al López, who grew up in Ybor City and signed with the Smokers in 1925, when he was just 16 years old. Lopez played for his hometown team for two seasons and eventually became the first Tampa native to play in the major leagues, the first to be a major league baseball manager, and the first to be inducted into the Baseball Hall of Fame.

Several other future or former MLB players played for the Smokers at some point during their career, including Camilo Pascual, Tommy Leach, and Hall of Famer Joe Medwick, who served as the team's player-manager in the early 1950s after finishing his major league career. Another notable Smoker alumnus was Cuban Baseball Hall of Famer Manuel Cueto.

== Notable alumni ==
=== Baseball Hall of Fame alumni ===
- Max Carey (1924), Inducted 1961
- Manuel Cueto (1928-1929), Inducted 1950 (Cuban Baseball Hall of Fame)
- Travis Jackson (1949), Inducted 1982
- Al Lopez (1925-1926), Inducted 1977
- Joe Medwick (1952), Inducted 1968

=== Other notable alumni ===
- Red Barrett (1920) MLB All-Star
- Ben Chapman (Smokers' manager in 1950) 4x MLB All-Star
- Wes Ferrell (1949) 2x MLB All-Star
- Tommy Leach (Smoker's manager from 1920-1922 and 1926-1927), MLB career record holder for Inside-the-park home runs
- Camilo Pascual (1952) 7x MLB All-Star

== Contemporary links ==
=== Tampa Bay Smokers softball team ===
The Tampa Bay Smokers, a men's fast-pitch softball team founded in 1995 and based in St. Petersburg, won multiple Amateur Softball Association of America and International Softball Congress championships over their eight seasons of play.

=== Tampa Bay Rays throwback uniforms ===
On July 2, 2011, the Tampa Bay Rays wore Tampa Smokers throwback uniforms to honor the 1951 Florida International League championship team. In a controversial move, the Rays chose to remove the image of a cigar which had underlined the word "Smokers" across the front of the old team's jerseys, calling the resulting "stogie-free" logo a "slightly more contemporary version".

== See also ==
- Baseball in the Tampa Bay Area
- Sports in the Tampa Bay Area
