= Bartow Polkers =

- 1919–1920; Bartow, Florida

Minor league affiliations
- Previous classes: Class D
- League: Florida State League

The Bartow Polkers were a short-lived professional minor league baseball team, based in Bartow, Florida that existed from 1919 until 1920. The team was a charter member of the then Class D level Florida State League.

In 1919, the Bartow Polkers were formed and became a member of the newly formed six-team Florida State League. Bartow joined the Bradenton Growers, Lakeland Highlanders, Orlando Caps, Sanford Celeryfeds and Tampa Smokers teams as Florida State League charter members.
