= Ocala Yearlings =

- 1940–1941; Ocala, Florida

Minor league affiliations
- Previous classes: Class D
- League: Florida State League

Team data
- Previous parks: Gerig Field

The Ocala Yearlings were a minor league baseball team based in Ocala, Florida. The team played the then-class D, Florida State League from 1940 through 1941. The team played its home games at Gerig Field, which opened in 1936, utilizing funding from the Works Progress Administration.

== Seasons ==
Year	Record	Finish	Manager
1940	57-82	7th	Wilbur Good / Gibbs Miller
1941	49-78	7th	Alan Mobley / Tom Smith
