= Orlando Senators =

- 1919–1972; (1919–1924, 1926–1928, 1937–1942, 1946–1961, 1963–1972); Orlando, Florida

Minor league affiliations
- Previous classes: Class A (1963–1972); Class D (1926–1928, 1937–1942, 1946–1961); Class C (1921–1924); Class D (1919–1920)
- League: Florida State League (1946–1961, 1963–1972); Florida East Coast League (1942); Florida State League (1919–1924, 1926–1928, 1937–1941)

Major league affiliations
- Previous teams: Minnesota Twins (1963–1972); Los Angeles Dodgers (1959–1961); Detroit Tigers (1957); Washington Senators (1939–1941, 1946–1955)

Minor league titles
- League titles: 11 (1919, 1921, 1923, 1927, 1940, 1946, 1955, 1968)

Team data
- Previous names: Orlando Twins (1963–1972); Orlando Dodgers (1959–1961); Orlando Flyers (1957–1958); Orlando Seratomas (1956); Orlando C.B.s (1954–1955); Orlando Senators (1938–1942, 1946–1953); Orlando Gulls (1937); Orlando Colts (1926–1928); Orlando Bulldogs (1922–1924); Orlando Tigers (1921); Orlando Caps (1919–1920)
- Previous parks: Tinker Field

The Orlando Senators and several different minor league baseball teams called the city of Orlando, Florida home between 1919 and 1972. Most played in the Florida State League.

== History ==
In 1919, the Orlando Caps became a charter member of the six-team, Class D level Florida State League. Orlando joined the Bartow Polkers, Bradenton Growers, Lakeland Highlanders, Sanford Celeryfeds and Tampa Smokers teams as Florida State League charter members.

The original Orlando franchise played between 1919 and 1924 and was alternately called the Caps, Tigers and Bulldogs. The Orlando Colts played between 1926 and 1928.

The Orlando Gulls began in 1937 but changed their name the following year to the Orlando Senators when they became an affiliate of the Washington Senators. The Senators remained through 1955 (though the team name and league was shut down from 1943–1945 during World War II and the name was changed to the Orlando C.B.s for 1954–1955). They won the FSL championship in 1940, 1946 and 1955

In 1956, they were an affiliate of the Diablos Rojos del Mexico of the Mexican League and were known as the Orlando Seratomas. As an affiliate of the Detroit Tigers they were the Orlando Flyers in 1957, a name that remained in 1958 when they were affiliated with the International League team, the Toronto Maple Leafs. They were a Los Angeles Dodgers affiliate known as the Orlando Dodgers from 1959–1961 when this version of the team was discontinued. The Minnesota Twins set up an affiliate called the Orlando Twins who played in the Florida State League from 1963–1972.

== Notable Orlando alumni ==
- Bert Blyleven (1969) Inducted Baseball Hall of Fame, 2011
- Rod Carew (1965) Inducted Baseball Hall of Fame, 1991
- Joe Tinker (1921) Inducted Baseball Hall of Fame, 1946
- Early Wynn (1972, MGR) Inducted Baseball Hall of Fame, 1972
- Jack Billingham (1961) MLB All-Star
- Steve Brye (1968)
- Choo-Choo Coleman (1955–1956, 1958–1959)
- Dave Goltz (1971)
- Tom Hall (1966)
- Sherry Robertson (1939)
- Eric Soderholm (1968–1970)
- Dean Stone (1949–1950) MLB All-Star
- Taffy Wright (1956)
