= Florida State League =

Baseball league in Florida, US

- Current season, competition or edition: 2025 Florida State League season
- Classification: Single-A (2021–present); Class A-Advanced (1990–2020)
- Sport: Baseball
- Founded: 1919 (107 years ago)
- No. of teams: 10
- Country: United States
- Most recent champion: Jupiter Hammerheads (2026)
- Most titles: St. Petersburg Saints (8)
- Website: www.milb.com/florida-state

The Florida State League (FSL) is a Minor League Baseball league based in the state of Florida. Having been classified at various levels throughout its existence, it operated at Class A-Advanced from 1990 until its demotion to Single-A following Major League Baseball's 2021 reorganization of the minor leagues. The league temporarily operated for the 2021 season as the Low-A Southeast before reassuming its original moniker in 2022.

Each league member is affiliated with a Major League Baseball (MLB) team, and most play in their affiliate's spring training facility.

== History ==
The league originated in 1919 with teams in Bartow (Bartow Polkers), Bradenton (Bradenton Growers), Lakeland (Lakeland Highlanders), Orlando (Orlando Caps), Sanford (Sanford Celeryfeds), and Tampa, Florida (Tampa Smokers). The league closed down in 1928 and resumed play in 1936. It has continued uninterrupted, except for a four-year (1942–1945) suspension during World War II.

Initially, the FSL was classified as a Class D circuit, roughly equivalent to a Rookie-level league today. It was elevated to Class C from 1921 to 1924, roughly equivalent to an Advanced Rookie league in the pre-2021 classification system and a Rookie-level league today. It reverted to Class D from 1925 to 1928. The league went dormant from 1929 to 1935 but was revived as a Class D circuit from 1936 to 1941. After another period of inactivity from 1942 to 1945, it continued at Class D from 1946 to 1962.

When the minor leagues were reconfigured in 1963, the FSL was reclassified as a Class A league, placing it three steps below the majors. There it continued until the next reorganization in 1990 when it was elevated to Class A-Advanced, remaining at the third rung on the minor league ladder.

The championship series' first cancellation was in 2001, when playoffs were canceled after the September 11 attacks. Afterwards, the 2004 playoffs were canceled due to the threat of Hurricane Ivan. Years later, the 2017 FSL Championship finals were canceled on September 5, due to the threat of Hurricane Irma. The winners of the division series playoff games were named co-champions. This marked the third time since 2000 that the championship series game was canceled. In 2019, the end of the season and playoffs were cancelled due to the threat of Hurricane Dorian.

The start of the 2020 season was postponed due to the COVID-19 pandemic before ultimately being cancelled on June 30. As part of Major League Baseball's 2021 reorganization of the minor leagues, the Florida State League was demoted to Single-A, four rungs below the majors, and temporarily renamed the "Low-A Southeast" for the 2021 season. Following MLB's acquisition of the rights to the names of the historical minor leagues, the Low-A Southeast was renamed the Florida State League effective with the 2022 season.

== Current teams ==
Division	Team	MLB affiliation	City	Stadium	Capacity
East	Daytona Tortugas	Cincinnati Reds	Daytona Beach, Florida	Jackie Robinson Ballpark	4,200
East	Jupiter Hammerheads	Miami Marlins	Jupiter, Florida	Roger Dean Stadium	6,871
East	Palm Beach Cardinals	St. Louis Cardinals	Jupiter, Florida	Roger Dean Stadium	6,871
East	St. Lucie Mets	New York Mets	Port St. Lucie, Florida	Clover Park	7,160
West	Bradenton Marauders	Pittsburgh Pirates	Bradenton, Florida	LECOM Park	8,500
West	Clearwater Threshers	Philadelphia Phillies	Clearwater, Florida	BayCare Ballpark	8,500
West	Dunedin Blue Jays	Toronto Blue Jays	Dunedin, Florida	TD Ballpark	8,500
West	Fort Myers Mighty Mussels	Minnesota Twins	Fort Myers, Florida	Hammond Stadium	9,300
West	Lakeland Flying Tigers	Detroit Tigers	Lakeland, Florida	Joker Marchant Stadium	8,500
West	Tampa Tarpons	New York Yankees	Tampa, Florida	George M. Steinbrenner Field	11,026

East Division, West Division

== Complete teams list ==
=== Teams of the early FSL (1919–1928) ===
- Bartow Polkers
- Bradenton Growers
- Clearwater Pelicans
- Daytona Beach Islanders
- Fort Lauderdale Tarpons
- Fort Myers Palms
- Jacksonville Indians
- Jacksonville Scouts
- Lakeland Highlanders
- Miami Hustlers
- Orlando Bulldogs
- Orlando Caps
- Orlando Colts
- Orlando Tigers
- St. Petersburg Saints
- Sanford Celeryfeds
- Sarasota Gulls
- Sarasota Tarpons
- Tampa Smokers
- West Palm Beach Sheriffs

=== Teams of the modern FSL (1936–present) ===
- Baseball City Royals
- Bradenton Marauders
- Brevard County Manatees
- Charlotte Rangers
- Charlotte Stone Crabs
- Clearwater Phillies
- Clearwater Threshers
- Cocoa Astros
- Cocoa Indians
- Daytona Beach Admirals
- Daytona Beach Astros
- Daytona Beach Dodgers
- Daytona Beach Islanders
- Daytona Cubs
- Daytona Tortugas
- Deerfield Beach Sun Sox
- DeLand Red Hats
- DeLand Reds
- DeLand Sun Caps
- Dunedin Blue Jays
- Florida Fire Frogs
- Fort Lauderdale Red Sox
- Fort Lauderdale Yankees
- Fort Myers Mighty Mussels
- Fort Myers Miracle
- Fort Myers Royals
- Gainesville G-Men
- Jacksonville Beach Sea Birds
- Jupiter Hammerheads
- Key West Conchs
- Key West Cubs
- Key West Padres
- Key West Sun Caps
- Kissimmee Cobras
- Lakeland Giants
- Lakeland Indians
- Lakeland Pilots
- Lakeland Flying Tigers
- Lakeland Tigers
- Leesburg Anglers
- Leesburg Athletics
- Leesburg Braves
- Leesburg Dodgers
- Leesburg Gondoliers
- Leesburg Lakers
- Leesburg Orioles
- Leesburg Packers
- Leesburg Pirates
- Miami Marlins
- Miami Miracle
- Miami Orioles
- Ocala Yearlings
- Orlando C.B.s
- Orlando Dodgers
- Orlando Flyers
- Orlando Gulls
- Orlando Senators
- Orlando Seratomas
- Orlando Twins
- Osceola Astros
- Palatka Azaleas
- Palatka Cubs
- Palatka Redlegs
- Palatka Tigers
- Palm Beach Cardinals
- Pompano Beach Cubs
- Pompano Beach Mets
- St. Augustine Saints
- St. Lucie Mets
- St. Petersburg Cardinals
- St. Petersburg Devil Rays
- St. Petersburg Saints
- Sanford Cardinals
- Sanford Celeryfeds
- Sanford Giants
- Sanford Greyhounds
- Sanford Lookouts
- Sanford Seminole Blues
- Sanford Seminoles
- Sarasota Reds
- Sarasota Red Sox
- Sarasota Sun Sox
- Sarasota White Sox
- Tampa Tarpons (1957–1988)
- Tampa Tarpons
- Tampa White Sox
- Tampa Yankees
- Vero Beach Dodgers
- Vero Beach Devil Rays
- West Palm Beach Braves
- West Palm Beach Expos
- West Palm Beach Indians
- West Palm Beach Sun Chiefs
- Winter Haven Mets
- Winter Haven Red Sox
- Winter Haven Sun Sox

== Awards ==
- Florida State League Most Valuable Player Award (formerly the Player of the Year Award)
- Florida State League Pitcher of the Year Award
- Florida State League Manager of the Year Award

== Florida State League Hall of Fame ==
The Florida State League Hall of Fame began in 2009.

== See also ==
- Baseball awards § Florida State League
