= Sports in Miami =

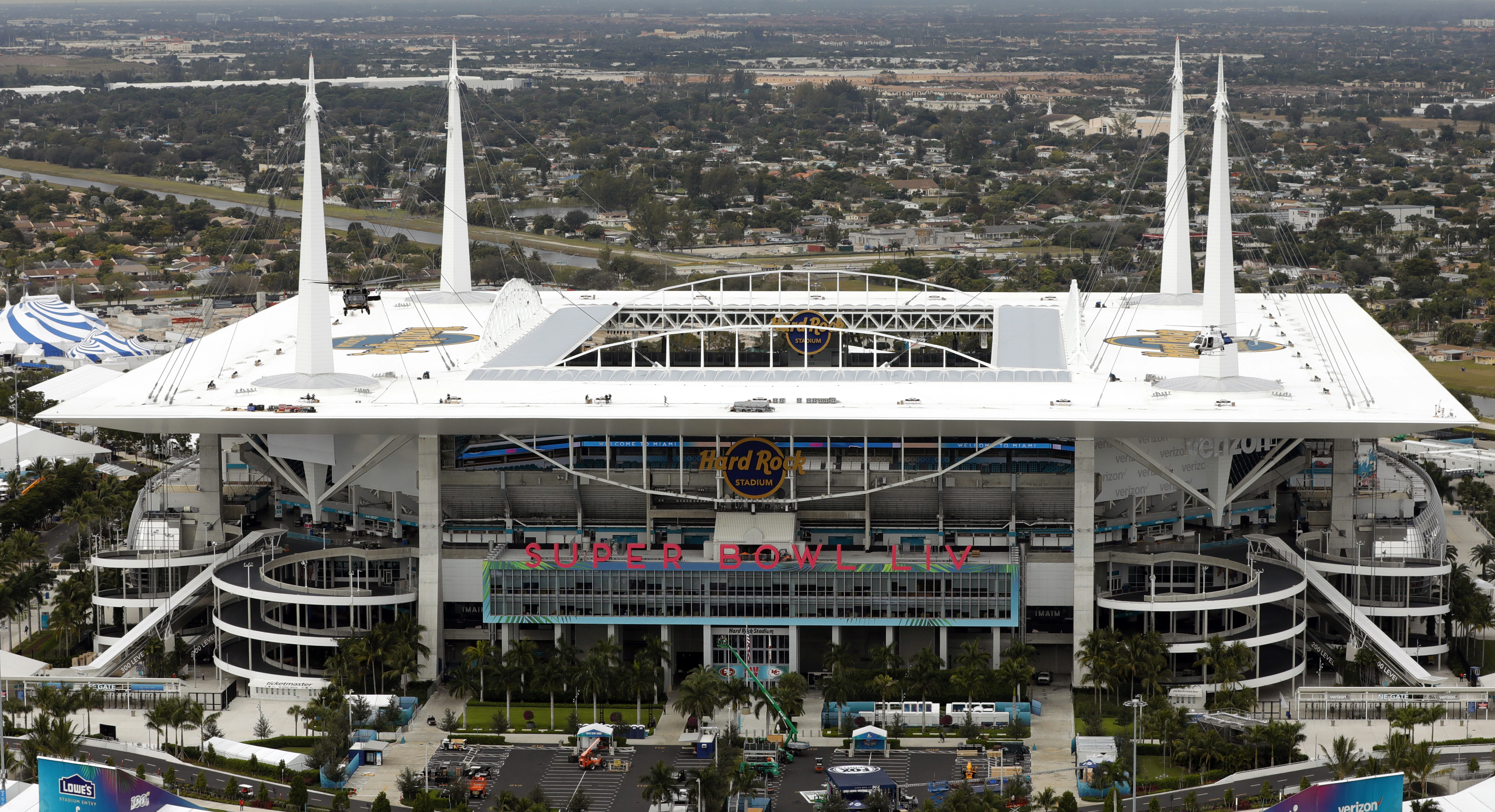
Hard Rock Stadium is the home stadium for the Miami Dolphins of the National Football League, the Miami Hurricanes football team of the University of Miami, and College Football Playoff's Orange Bowl game held annually each January.

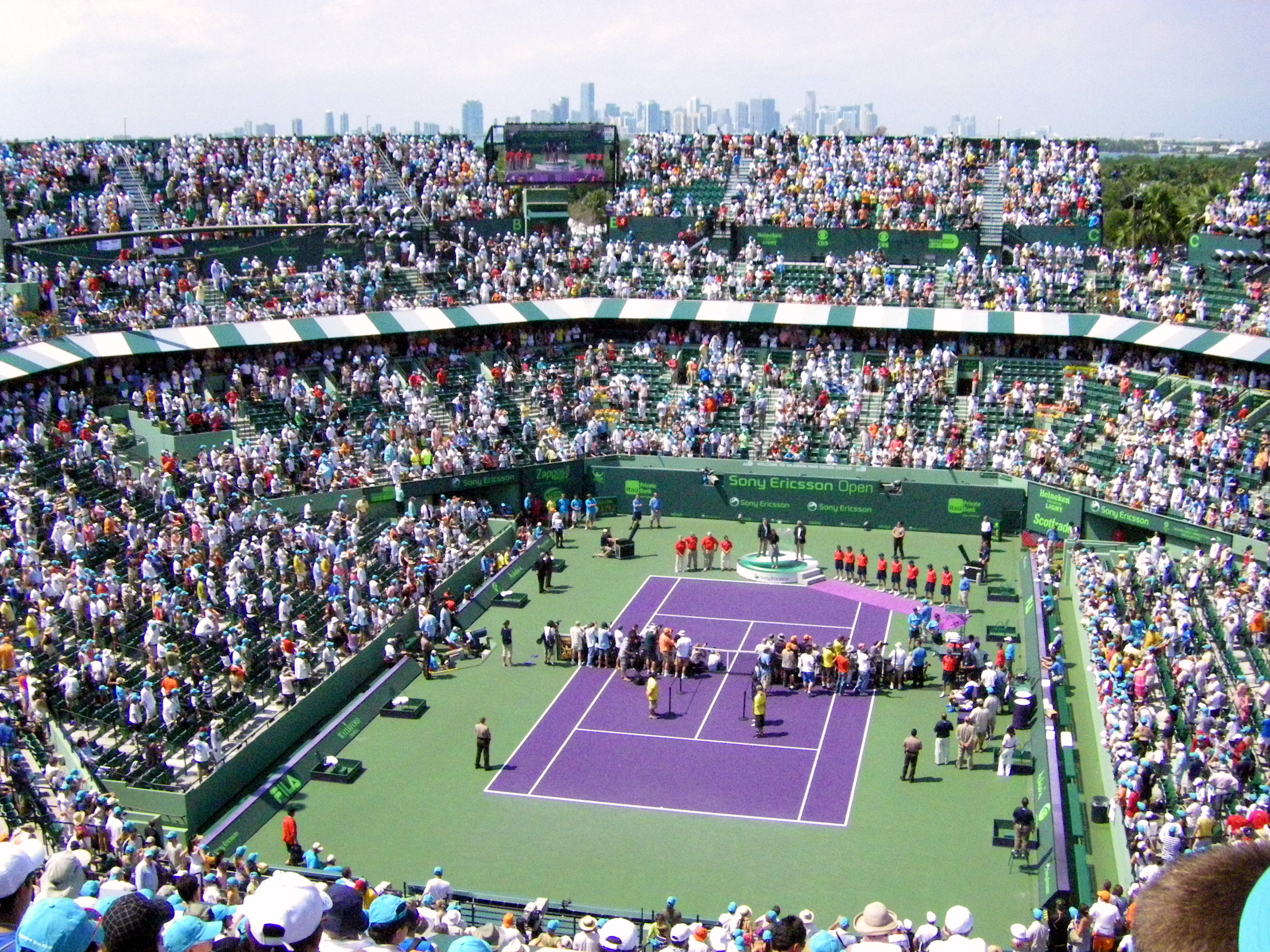
The Sony Ericsson Open, a major tennis tournament, is held in Miami annually.

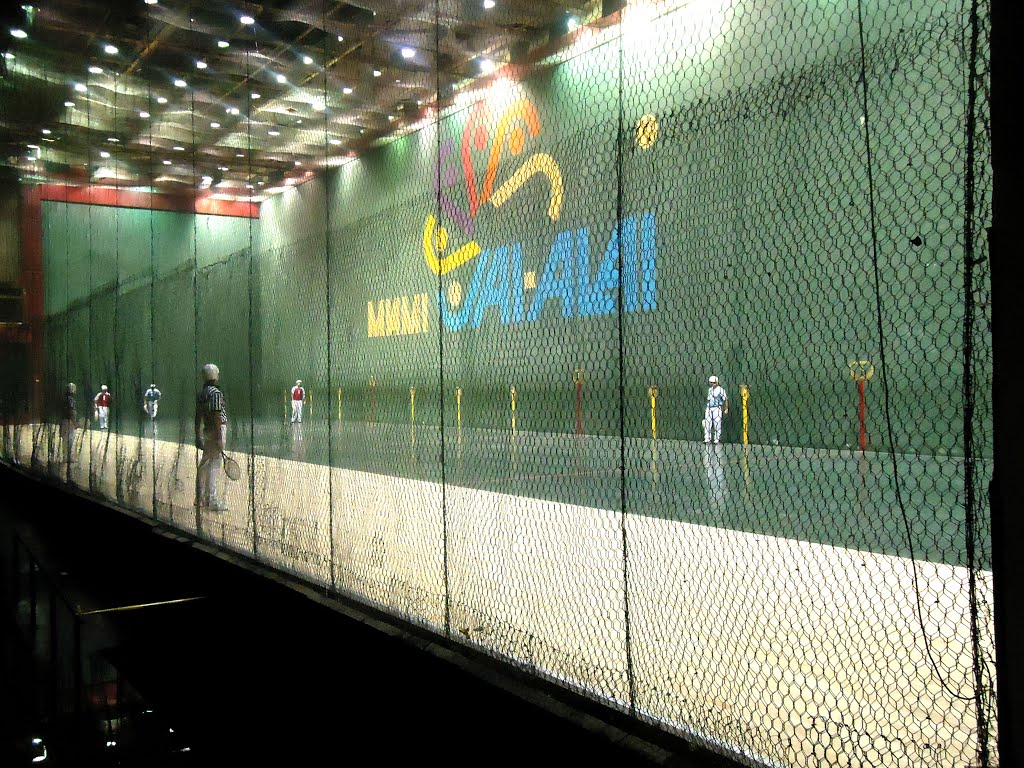
Casino Miami, built in 1926 and known as "The Yankee Stadium of Jai Alai"

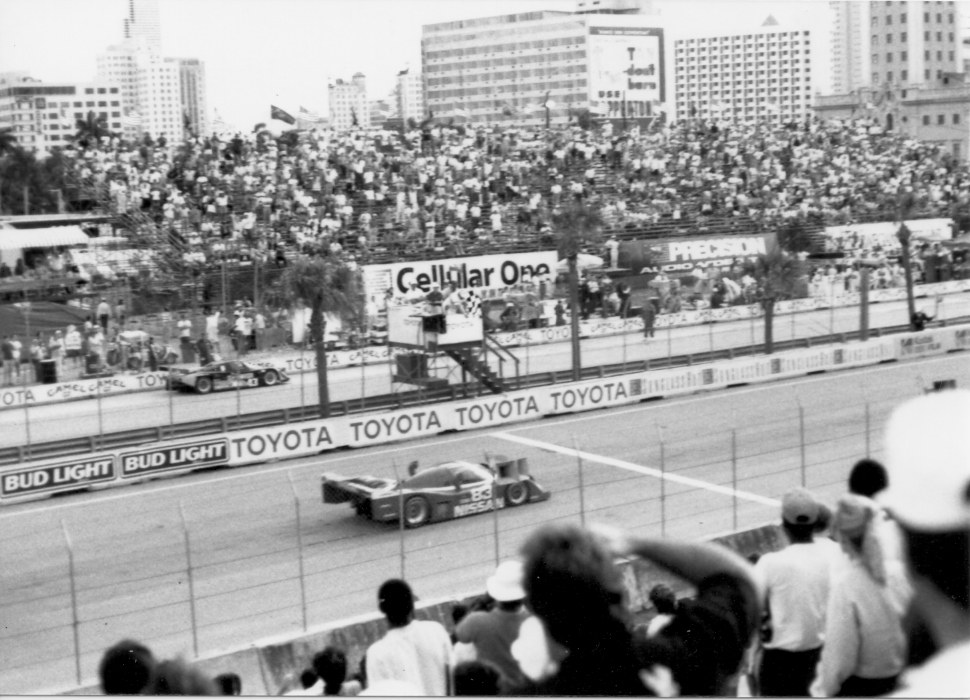
Geoff Brabham in the Nissan NPT-91 about to take the checkered flag at the conclusion of the 1992 Miami Grand Prix on the Bicentennial Park (Now Museum Park (Miami)) circuit.

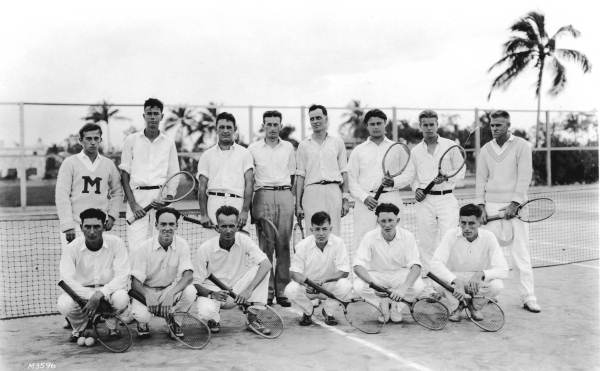
Tennis players in Coral Gables in 1925

The Miami metropolitan area in the South Florida region of the United States is home to five major professional sports league teams — the Miami Marlins of Major League Baseball, the Miami Heat of the National Basketball Association, the Miami Dolphins of the National Football League, the Florida Panthers of the National Hockey League and Inter Miami CF of Major League Soccer.

Miami is also home to the Miami Open for professional tennis, numerous greyhound racing and horse racing tracks, boxing, marinas, jai alai venues, and golf courses. The city streets has hosted professional auto races, the Miami Indy Challenge and later the Grand Prix Americas, whereas the Homestead–Miami Speedway oval located 35 miles (56 km) southwest currently hosts NASCAR national races, and the Miami International Autodrome has hosted the Grand Prix of Miami or Miami Grand Prix in Formula One since 2022. In 2015, Miami hosted a one-off Formula E race. Miami is also home to Paso Fino horses, where competitions are held at Tropical Park Equestrian Center.

== Major league teams ==
The Miami area is home to five major professional sports league franchises. Each of those teams are currently worth over a billion dollars in value. Currently, the Miami Heat, the Miami Marlins, and Inter Miami CF play their games within Miami's city limits. The Heat play their home games at the Kaseya Center in Downtown Miami. The Miami Marlins home ballpark is LoanDepot Park, located in the Little Havana section of the city on the site of the old Orange Bowl stadium. Inter Miami CF play at Nu Stadium in Grapeland Heights. Wayne Huizenga once was the owner of all 3 South Florida Miami team franchises being the Miami Dolphins, Miami Marlins and the Florida Panthers. Huizenga was notable for introducing baseball and ice hockey to the South Florida area as the creator and initial owner of the Florida Marlins and Florida Panthers. Also, he bought the cable television channel SportsChannel Florida (now Bally Sports Florida) in 1996 to air his teams' games in the region.

The city's first entry into the American Football League was the Miami Dolphins, which competed in the fourth AFL league from 1966 to 1969. In 1970 the Dolphins joined the NFL when the AFL–NFL merger occurred. The team made its first Super Bowl appearance in Super Bowl VI, but lost to the Dallas Cowboys. The following year, the Dolphins completed the NFL's only perfect season culminating in a Super Bowl win. The 1972 Dolphins were the third NFL team to accomplish a perfect regular season, and they went on to win that year's Super Bowl VII, as well as the next year's Super Bowl VIII. Miami also appeared in Super Bowl XVII and Super Bowl XIX, losing both games. The Miami Dolphins play their games at Hard Rock Stadium in suburban Miami Gardens. They also hosted both the 1975 Pro Bowl and the 2010 Pro Bowl.

The Orange Bowl, a member of the College Football Playoff, hosts their college football bowl game annually at Hard Rock Stadium. The stadium has also hosted the Super Bowl; the Miami metro area has hosted the game a total of eleven times (six Super Bowls at the now Hard Rock Stadium, including most recently Super Bowl LIV and five at the Miami Orange Bowl), more than any other metro area but are now tied with New Orleans for hosting the most Super Bowls. It also had time for a Super Bowl LIV halftime show.

The Miami Heat of the National Basketball Association were formed in 1988 as an expansion team. They have won three league championships (in 2006, 2012 and 2013), and seven conference titles. City also hosted the 1990 NBA All Star Game.

The Miami Marlins of Major League Baseball began play in the 1993 season. They won the World Series in 1997 and 2003. From 1993 until 2011, Hard Rock Stadium also was the home field of the Marlins until their move to LoanDepot Park in 2012. The venue hosted the 2017 Major League Baseball All-Star Game.

The Florida Panthers of the National Hockey League were founded in 1993 as an expansion team. They have made four appearances in the Stanley Cup Final, losing in 1996 and 2023, and winning in 2024 and 2025. They play in nearby Sunrise at the Amerant Bank Arena.The arena also hosted the 2003 NHL All-Star Game and the 2023 National Hockey League All-Star Game. They also use to play in the old Miami Arena. In January 2026, the Florida Panthers will host a match against the New York Rangers in the 2026 NHL Winter Classic taking place at the LoanDepot Park in Miami.

Inter Miami CF of Major League Soccer was founded in 2018 as an expansion team. From the 2020 to the 2025 season, Inter played at Chase Stadium, which was built on the site of the former Lockhart Stadium in Fort Lauderdale. The site, which includes a 50,000 square-foot training facility, will remain the permanent training complex for the Clubs’ teams, including its youth Academy and Inter Miami CF II. After some years of delay, construction started on Nu Stadium, a new stadium in Miami's Grapeland Heights neighborhood. On August 19, 2023, in that year's Leagues Cup final against Nashville SC, Inter Miami won its first-ever Leagues Cup title, winning 10–9 in penalties after a 1–1 draw. In the 2024 season, Inter Miami secured their first Supporters' Shield. The side would win a first MLS Cup title in 2025, following a 3–1 victory against the Vancouver Whitecaps. Inter opened Nu Stadium on April 4, 2026.

Location of the five major league teams in the Miami Metropolitan Area

=== Sports venues ===
Miami Metro Area holds the majority of sports arenas, stadiums and complexes in South Florida. Some of these sports facilities are:

- Hard Rock Stadium – Miami Dolphins (NFL football); Miami Hurricanes (NCAA college football); Miami Open (ATP and WTA tennis); Miami Grand Prix (Formula 1 auto racing)
  - Miami International Autodrome – Formula 1 circuit on the grounds of Hard Rock Stadium
- LoanDepot Park – Miami Marlins (MLB baseball)
- Kaseya Center – Miami Heat (NBA basketball)
- Nu Stadium – Inter Miami CF (MLS soccer)
- Amerant Bank Arena – Florida Panthers (NHL ice hockey)
- Tennis Center at Crandon Park – Former home of the Miami Open from 1987 until 2018
- Chase Stadium – Inter Miami CF II (MLS Next Pro soccer)
- Flagler Credit Union Stadium – Florida Atlantic Owls (NCAA college football)
- Eleanor R. Baldwin Arena – FAU Owls (NCAA men's and women's college basketball and volleyball)
- Pitbull Stadium – FIU Panthers (NCAA college football); Miami FC (USL soccer)
- Ocean Bank Convocation Center – FIU Panthers (NCAA men's and women's college basketball and volleyball)
- Infinity Insurance Park – FIU Panthers (NCAA college baseball)
- Watsco Center – Miami Hurricanes (NCAA men's and women's college basketball)
- Alex Rodriguez Park at Mark Light Field – Miami Hurricanes (NCAA college baseball)
- Cobb Stadium - Miami Hurricanes (NCAA soccer); Miami Hurricanes (NCAA track and field)
- Tropical Park Stadium
- Homestead-Miami Speedway - NASCAR auto racing; IndyCar auto racing; IMSA auto racing; CCS motorcycle racing
- Calder Race Course
- Hialeah Park Race Track
- Gulfstream Park
- Miami Beach Convention Center
- Fair Expo Center
- Knight Center Complex
- Flamingo Field
- Ansin Sports Complex
- West Palm Beach Auditorium
- Delray Beach Tennis Center
- FTL War Memorial
- Seminole Hard Rock Hotel & Casino Hollywood
- Central Broward Park
- Trump National Doral Miami
- Trump International Golf Club (West Palm Beach)
- Hertz Arena
- Hammond Stadium
- Hard Rock Live
- Hard Rock Cafe
- Roger Dean Stadium
- Ted Hendricks Stadium
- Cacti Park of the Palm Beaches
- Brian Piccolo Park
- Big Easy Casino
- Inverrary Country Club
- Bergeron Rodeo Grounds
- Americraft Expo Center
- Countess de Hoernle Student Life Center
- Suncoast Stadium
- Old Palm Golf Club
- Grand Champions Polo Club
- Palm Meadows Thoroughbred Training Center
- Seminole Golf Club
- Pine Tree Golf Club
- PGA National Resort
- PGA National Champion Course
- FAU Soccer Stadium
- FAU Baseball Stadium
- Evert Tennis Academy
- The Fort (pickleball)
- Harrah's Pompano Beach
- Venetian Pool
- BeyondBancard Field
- SoFi Center
- Sugar Sand Park
- National Polo Center

Former venues include:

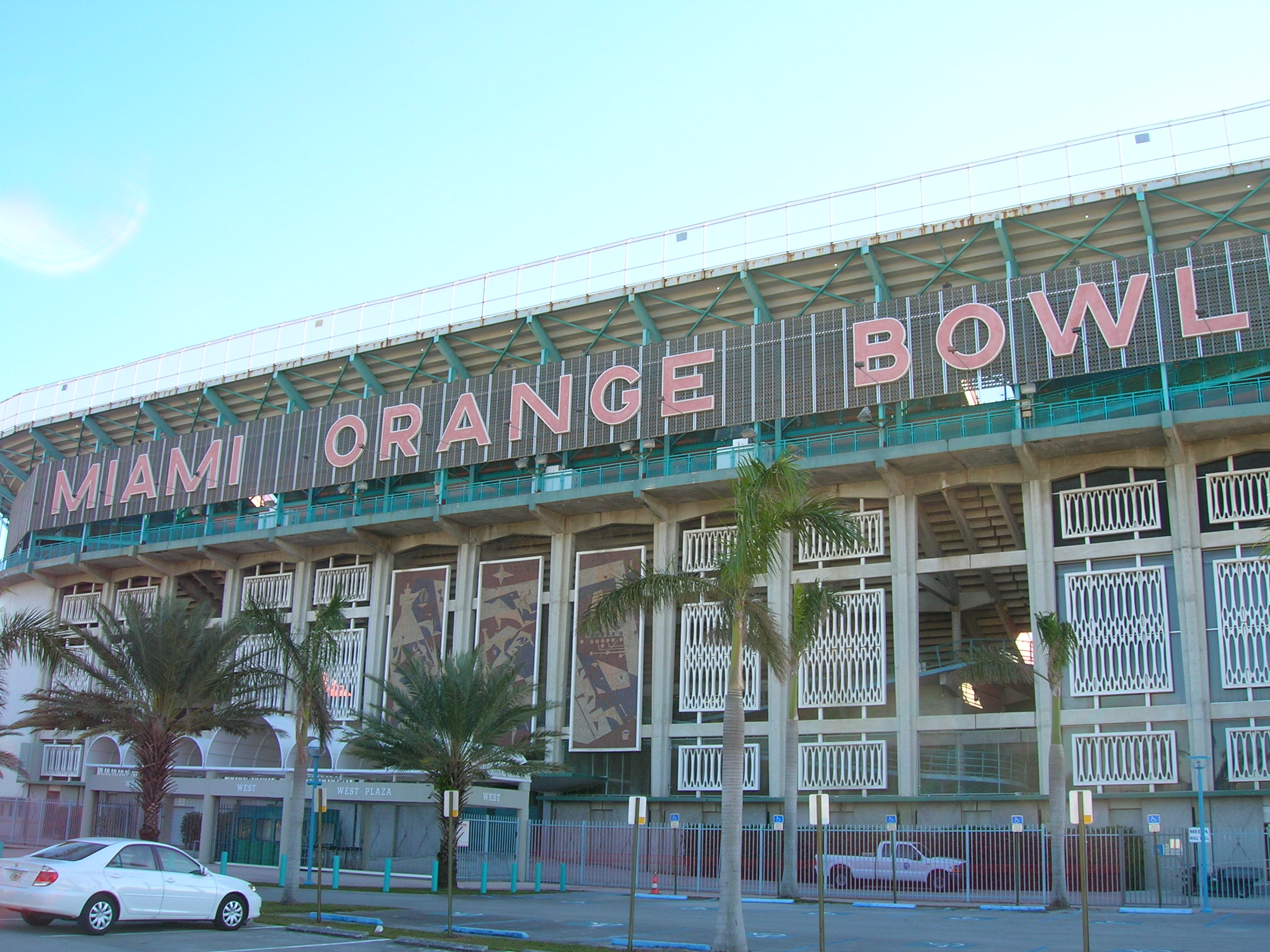
The Miami Orange Bowl

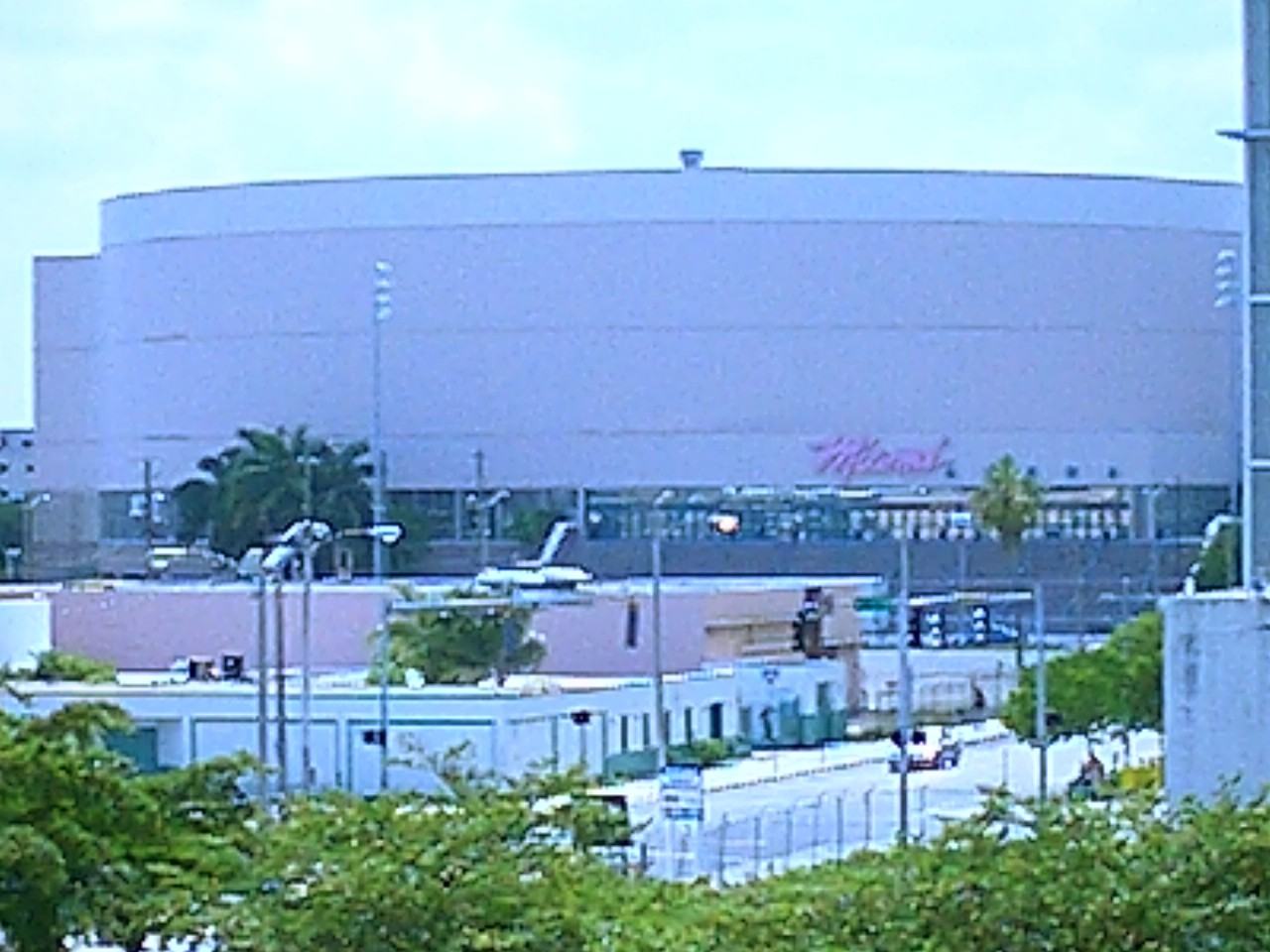
The Miami Arena in 2002

- Bobby Maduro Miami Stadium
- Miami Arena - Former home of the Miami Heat and the Florida Panthers (NHL hockey)
- Miami Orange Bowl—Former home of the Miami Dolphins and the Miami Hurricanes (NCAA college football)
- Miami Marine Stadium
- Miami Coliseum
- Homestead Sports Complex
- Fulford–Miami Speedway
- Pompano Beach Municipal Stadium
- Hollywood Sportatorium
- Lockhart Stadium
- Fort Lauderdale Stadium
- Connie Mack Field
- Gulfstream Polo Club
- West Palm Beach Municipal Stadium
- Palm Beach Speedway
- Tropical Park Race Track
- Wickers Stadium
- Coconut Grove Convention Center
- Miami-Hollywood Motorsports Park
- Palm Beach International Raceway
- Casino Miami - Formerly known as Miami Jai-Alai Fronton

Miami area major league professional teams
Club	Sport	Miami area location since	League	Venue	Titles in Miami
Miami Dolphins	American football	1965	National Football League	Hard Rock Stadium	1972 (VII), 1973 (VIII)
Miami Heat	Basketball	1988	National Basketball Association	Kaseya Center	2006, 2012, 2013
Miami Marlins	Baseball	1993	Major League Baseball	LoanDepot Park	1997, 2003
Florida Panthers	Ice hockey	1993	National Hockey League	Amerant Bank Arena	2024, 2025
Inter Miami CF	Soccer	2018	Major League Soccer	Nu Stadium	2025
LOVB Miami	Volleyball	2026	League One Volleyball	Watsco Center	N/A
Florida Flamingos	Tennis	2026	World TeamTennis	Amerant Bank Arena	N/A

Major professional and D-I college teams (attendance > 10,000)
Club	Sport	League	Venue (Capacity)	Attendance	League Championships
Miami Dolphins	Football	National Football League	Hard Rock Stadium (64,767)	70,035	Super Bowl (2) — 1972, 1973
Miami Heat	Basketball	National Basketball Association	Kaseya Center (19,600)	19,710	NBA Finals (3) — 2006, 2012, 2013
Miami Marlins	Baseball	Major League Baseball	LoanDepot Park (36,742)	21,386	World Series (2) — 1997, 2003
Inter Miami CF	Soccer	Major League Soccer	Nu Stadium (21,550)	21,550	MLS Cup (1) — 2025
Florida Panthers	Hockey	National Hockey League	Amerant Bank Arena (19,250)	19,250	Stanley Cup (2) — 2024, 2025
Miami Hurricanes	Football	NCAA D-I (ACC)	Hard Rock Stadium (64,767)	53,837	National titles (5) — 1983, 1987, 1989, 1991, 2001
Florida Atlantic Owls	Football	NCAA D-1 (AAC)	Flagler Credit Union Stadium (29,571)	18,948	None
FIU Panthers	Football	NCAA D-I (Conference USA)	Pitbull Stadium (23,500)	15,453	None

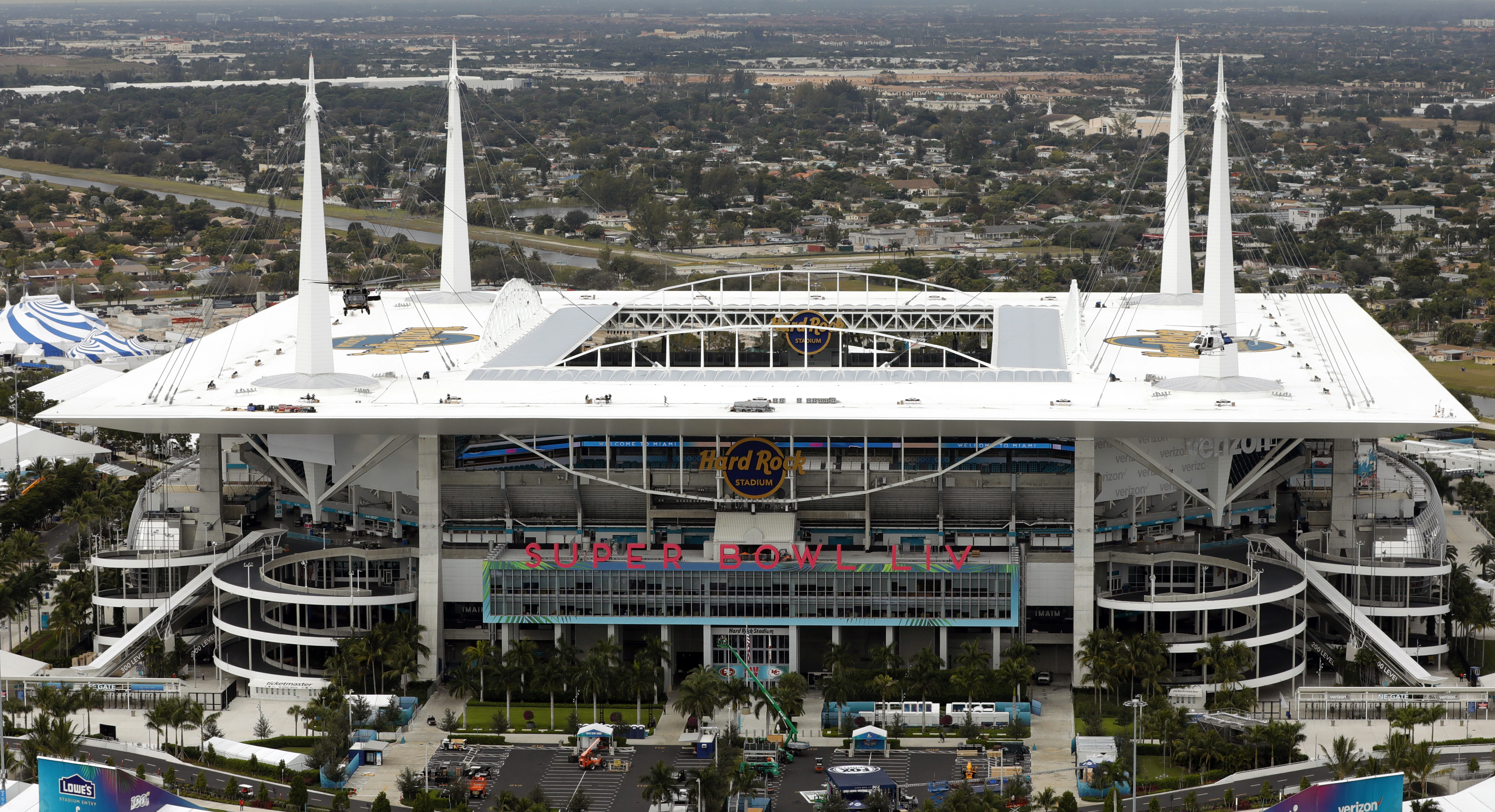
Hard Rock Stadium, home of the Miami Dolphins (NFL) and Miami Hurricanes (NCAA)

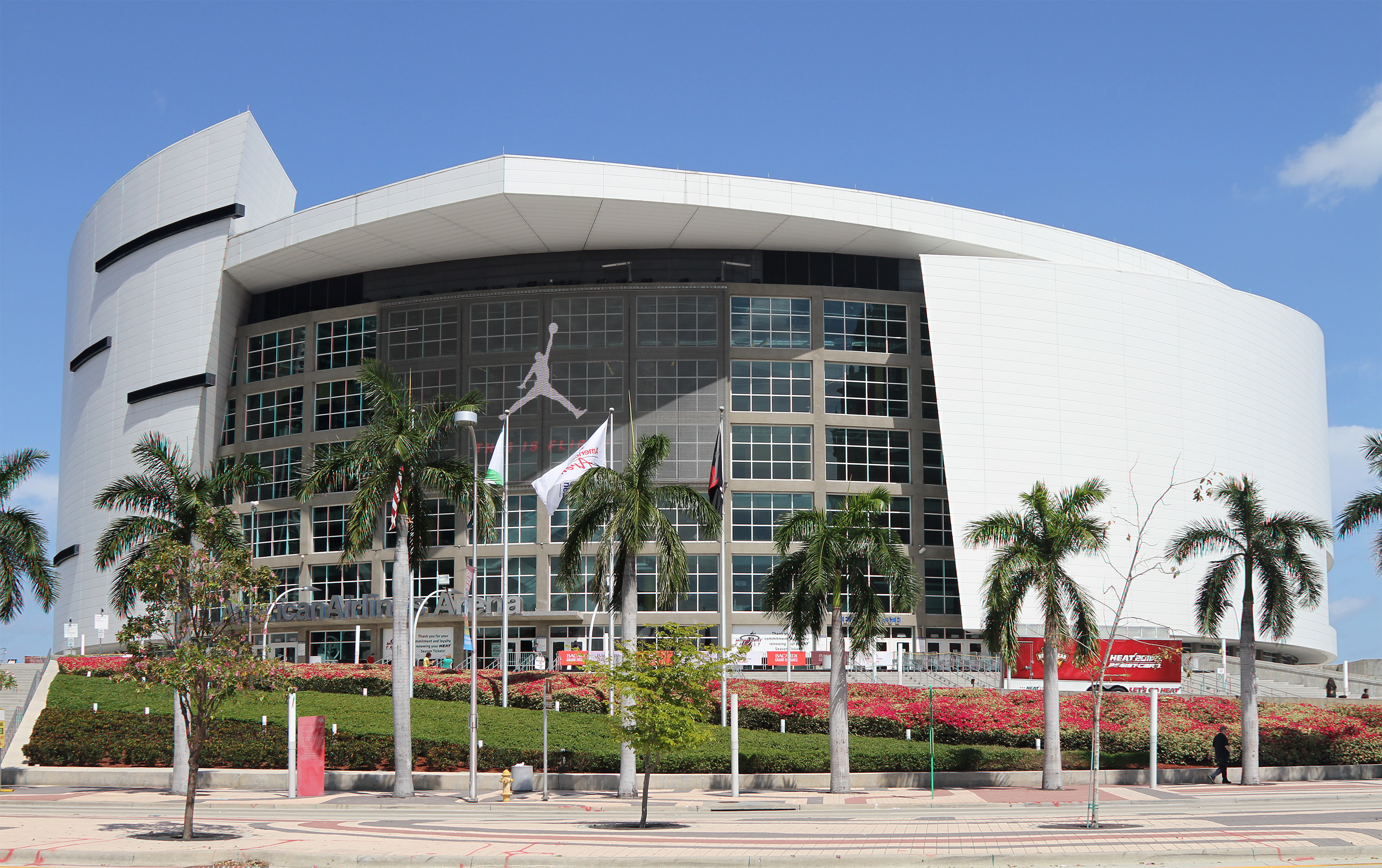
Kaseya Center, home of the Miami Heat (NBA)

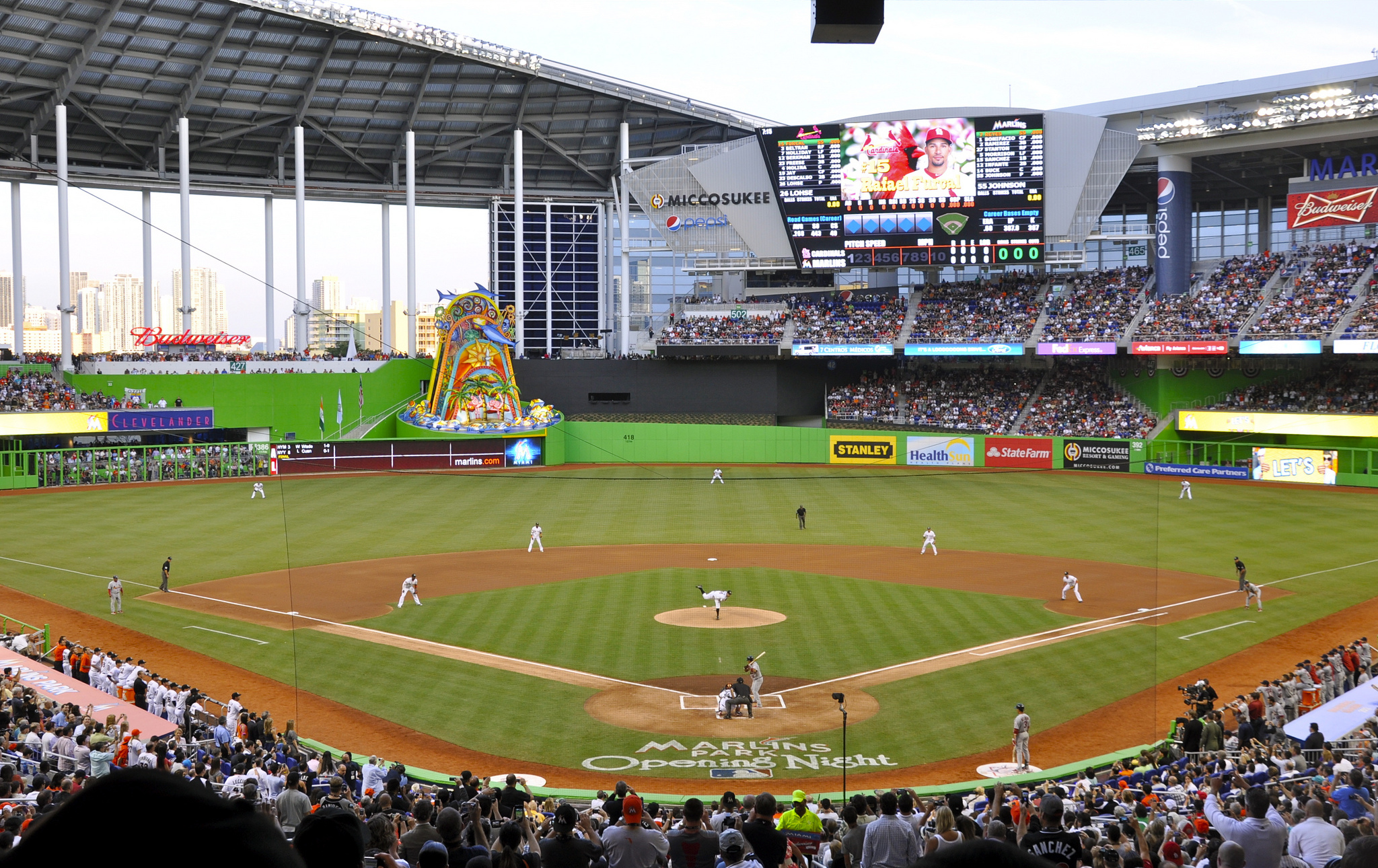
LoanDepot Park, home of the Miami Marlins (MLB)

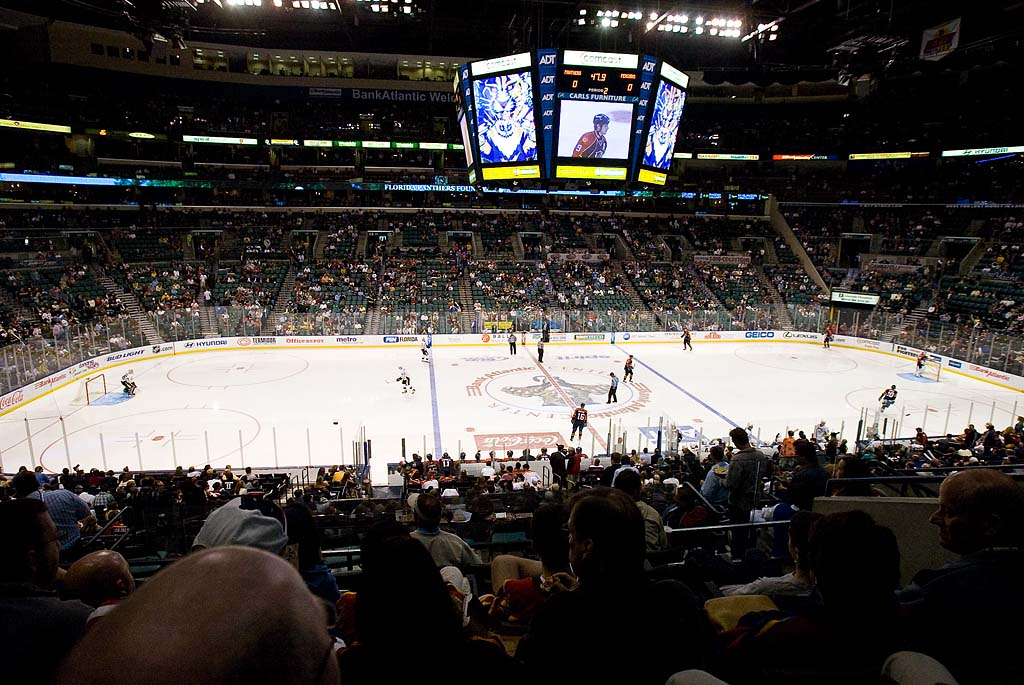
Amerant Bank Arena, home of the Florida Panthers (NHL)

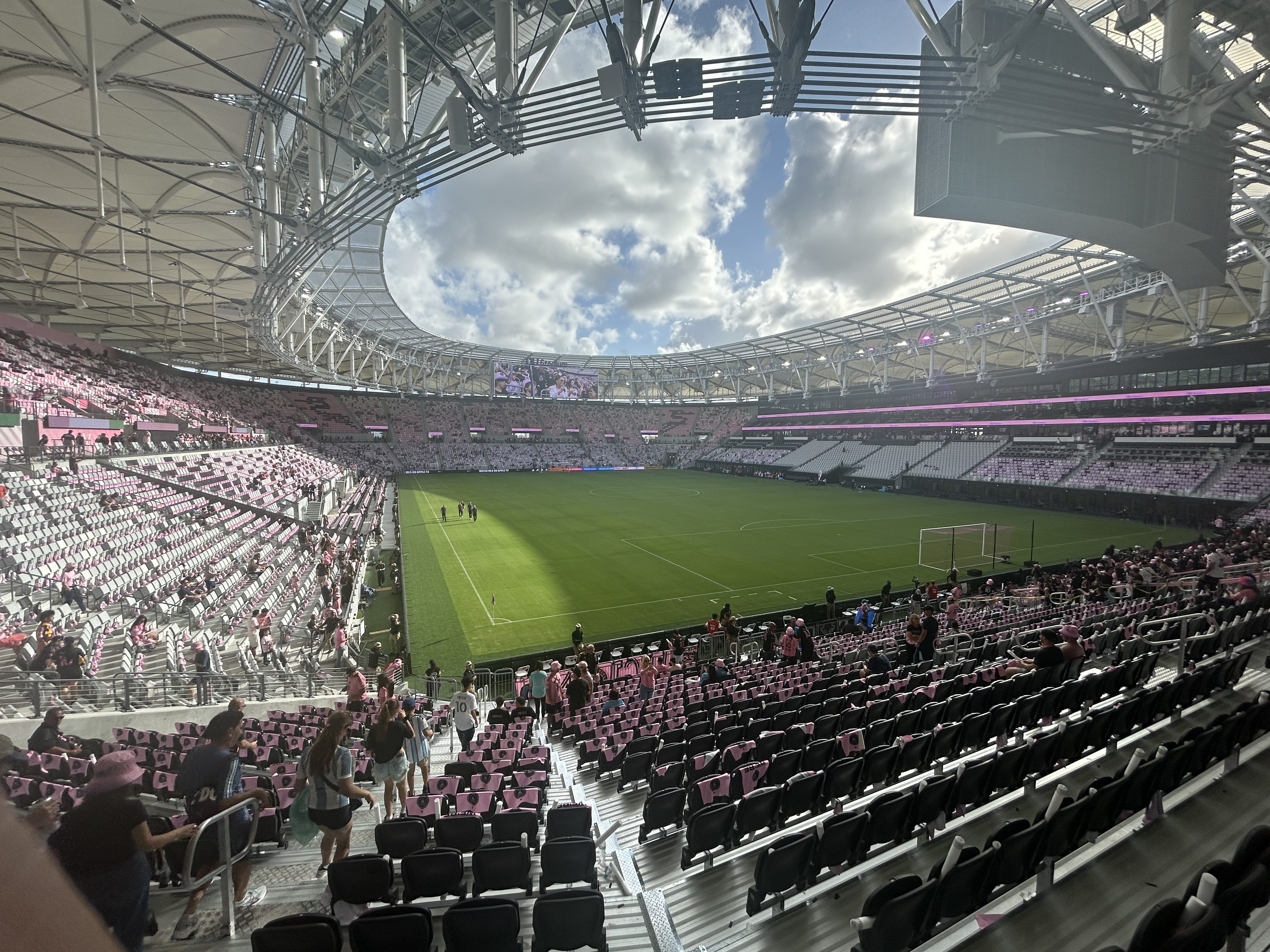
Nu Stadium, home stadium of Inter Miami CF (MLS)

=== Minor league and other sports ===
The Miami area is also host to minor league sports teams, including:

- The Miami Marlins and St. Louis Cardinals conduct spring training in Jupiter at Roger Dean Stadium.
- The Houston Astros and Washington Nationals conduct spring training in West Palm Beach at Cacti Park of the Palm Beaches.
- Inter Miami CF have a reserve team that plays in MLS Next Pro.
- The Homestead-Miami Speedway oval has hosted NASCAR Cup Series and IndyCar Series events. Temporary street circuits at Museum Park hosted several CART, IMSA GT, and American Le Mans Series races between from 1986 to 1995, as well as a Formula E race in 2015. The Palm Beach International Raceway is a minor road course.
- The Miami Sharks of Major League Rugby play at AutoNation Sports Field in Fort Lauderdale.

== Other professional teams ==
Miami area's other professional sports teams
Club	Sport	City	League	Venue	League Championships
Florida Freedom	Rodeo	Sunrise, Florida	Professional Bull Riders	Amerant Bank Arena	None
Miami Heretics	Esports	Miami & Orlando	Call of Duty League	N/A	None
Florida Mayhem	Esports	Miami & Orlando	Overwatch League	N/A	Overwatch League champions: (2023)
Inter Miami CF II	Soccer	Fort Lauderdale	MLS Next Pro	Chase Stadium	None
Jupiter Hammerheads	Baseball	Jupiter	Florida State League	Roger Dean Stadium	Florida State League champions: (2023)
Miami FC	Soccer	Unincorporated Miami	USL Championship	Pitbull Stadium	NASL 2017 Regular Season (fall & spring); National Premier Soccer League Champions (2) (2018, 2019); NISA (2019)
Fort Lauderdale United FC	Soccer	Fort Lauderdale	USL Super League	Amerant Bank Field	None
USL Palm Beach Women’s	Soccer	Palm Beach County, Florida	USL Super League	N/A	None
USL Palm Beach Men’s	Soccer	Palm Beach County	USL Championship	N/A	None
Palm Beach Cardinals	Baseball	Jupiter, Florida	Florida State League	Roger Dean Stadium	Florida State League champions (3): (2005, 2017, 2024)
Miami 305	Basketball	Miami	BIG3	Kaseya Center	Big3 champions (2025)
Hive BC	Basketball	Miami	Unrivaled	Wayfair Arena	0
Lunar Owls BC	Basketball	Miami	Unrivaled	N/A	0
Breeze BC	Basketball	Miami	Unrivaled	N/A	0
Mist BC	Basketball	Miami	Unrivaled	N/A	0
Rose BC	Basketball	Miami	Unrivaled	N/A	0
Phantom BC	Basketball	Miami	Unrivaled	N/A	0
Vinyl BC	Basketball	Miami	Unrivaled	N/A	0
Laces BC	Basketball	Miami	Unrivaled	N/A	0
Miami Sharks	Rugby union	Fort Lauderdale	Major League Rugby	AutoNation Sports Field	0

== College sports ==
Greater Miami is home to many college sports teams with football and basketball having preeminent status. The most prominent are the University of Miami Hurricanes, whose football team plays at Hard Rock Stadium in Miami Gardens and whose men's and women's basketball teams play at Watsco Center on the University of Miami's campus in Coral Gables. The Hurricanes compete in the Atlantic Coast Conference (ACC), one of the Power Four conferences within NCAA Division I, the highest level of collegiate athletics. Two other area programs also compete in Division I, though in the so-called Group of Six conferences. The Florida Atlantic University Owls football team plays at Flagler Credit Union Stadium, and its men's basketball team plays at Eleanor R. Baldwin Arena in Boca Raton. The Florida International University Panthers football team plays at Pitbull Stadium, and its basketball team plays at Ocean Bank Convocation Center in University Park. The University of Miami's football team has won five NCAA National Championships since 1983 and its baseball team has won four national championships since 1982. Other collegiate sports programs in the metropolitan area include two NCAA Division II members—the Nova Southeastern Sharks of Nova Southeastern University in Davie and the Barry Buccaneers of Barry University in Miami Shores.

Miami area college sports teams
College / Athletics	Football (average attendance)	Basketball (average attendance)	Division	Conference
Miami Hurricanes	Miami Hurricanes football (53,837)	Miami Hurricanes men's basketball (5,777)	D-I	Atlantic Coast Conference
Florida Atlantic Owls	FAU football (18,948)	FAU basketball (1,190)	D-I	American Conference
FIU Panthers	FIU football (15,453)	FIU basketball (1,474)	D-I	Conference USA

== Defunct and relocated teams ==
A number of defunct teams were located in Miami, including:

- Basketball: Miami Floridians (ABA), Miami Sol (WNBA), Miami Tropics (ABA).
- Ice hockey: Miami Matadors (ECHL), Miami Screaming Eagles (WHA), Miami Manatees (WHA2), Tropical Hockey League. (Note: All four teams of the Tropical Hockey League—the Miami Clippers, Miami Beach Pirates, Coral Gables Seminoles, and Havana Tropicals—played in the Miami Coliseum in nearby Coral Gables)
- Soccer: Miami Toros / Ft. Lauderdale Strikers (NASL), Miami Fusion (NPSL)
- American football: Miami Seahawks (AAFC), Miami Tropics (SFL), Miami Hooters (Arena Football League) Miami Caliente.

The Miami Fusion, a defunct Major League Soccer team, played at Lockhart Stadium in nearby Broward County. The Miami Kickers, a Women's Premier Soccer League, played at American Heritage School in Plantation, Broward County.

In 1946, the Miami Seahawks played in the All-America Football Conference for one season, 1946, and then folded.

In 1996, Miami acquired the AFL team the Sacramento Attack, which was renamed as the Miami Hooters (due to its association with the Florida-based Hooters restaurant chain), and it played from 1993 to 1995. In 1996, the association with the chain was completed, and the team moved to West Palm Beach and renamed as the Florida Bobcats.

== Boxing ==
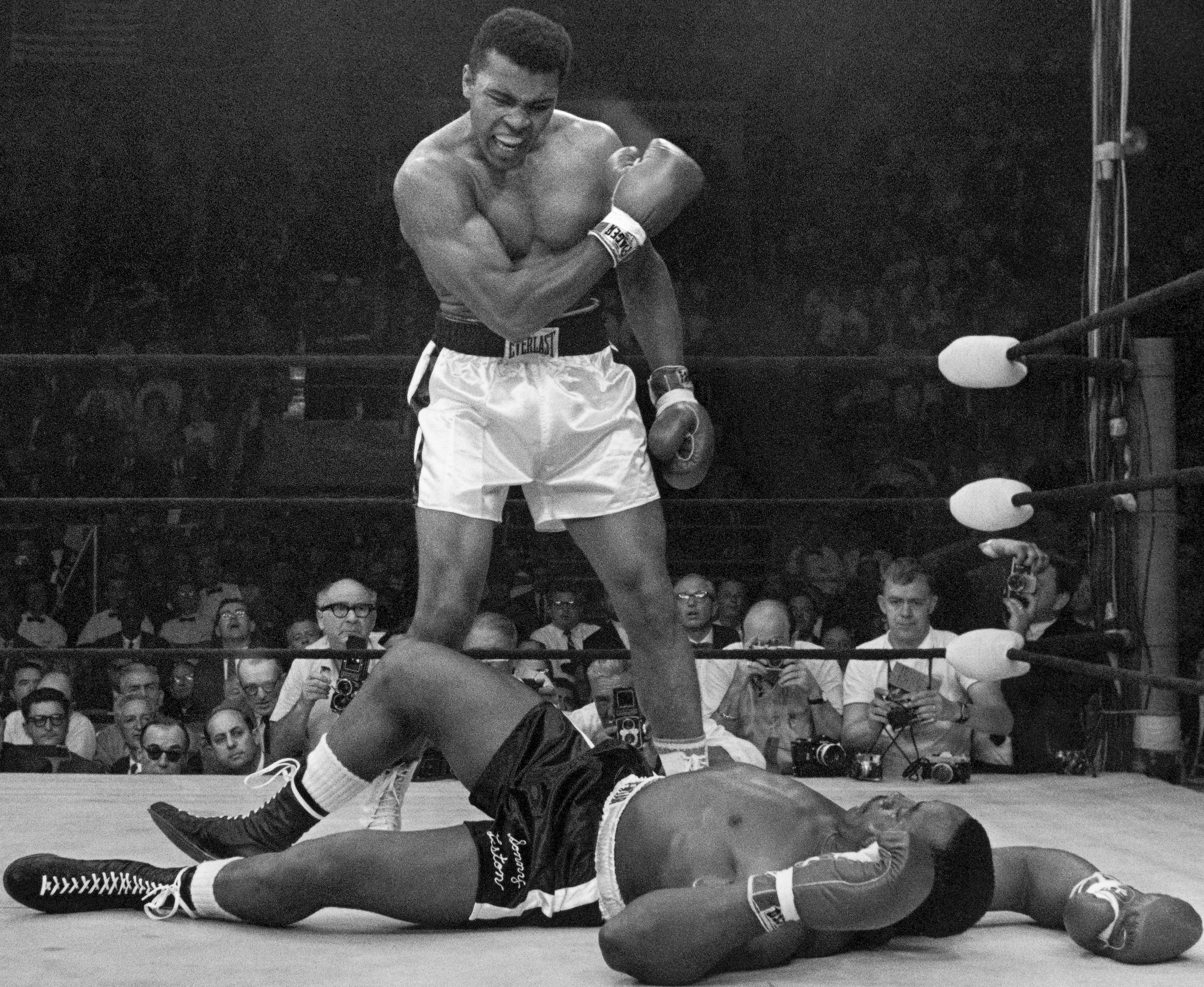
Muhammad Ali standing over Sonny Liston in the second match after the famous "phantom punch"

Miami has hosted numerous boxing matches including high-profile bouts at the Hard Rock Stadium.

- Jack Sharkey vs. Young Stribling (1929)
- Joe Knight vs. Maxie Rosenbloom (1934)
- Jake LaMotta vs. Billy Kilgore (1954)
- Archie Moore vs. Joey Maxim (1954)
- Cassius Clay vs. Herb Siler (1960)
- Cassius Clay vs. Tony Esperti (1961)
- Cassius Clay vs. Jim Robinson (1961)
- Cassius Clay vs. Donnie Fleeman (1961)
- Floyd Patterson vs. Ingemar Johansson III (1961)
- Cassius Clay vs. Don Warner (1962)
- Sonny Liston vs. Floyd Patterson II (1963)
- Sonny Liston vs. Cassius Clay 1 (1964)
- Muhammad Ali vs. Sonny Liston II (1964)
- Muhammad Ali vs. Jody Ballard (1977)
- Muhammad Ali vs. Michael Dokes (1977)
- Roberto Durán vs. Jimmy Batten (1982)
- Aaron Pryor vs. Alexis Argüello (1982)
- Floyd Mayweather Jr. vs. Angel Manfredy (1998)
- Floyd Mayweather Jr. vs. Henry Bruseles (2005)
- Samuel Peter vs. James Toney II (2006)
- Nate Campbell vs. Ali Funeka (2009)
- Canelo Álvarez vs. Avni Yıldırım (2021)
- Floyd Mayweather vs. Logan Paul (2021)
- Evander Holyfield vs. Vitor Belfort (2021)
- YouTubers vs. TikTokers (2021)
- Floyd Mayweather Jr. vs. John Gotti III (2023)
- Teofimo Lopez vs. Steve Claggett (2024)
- Jake Paul vs. Anthony Joshua (2025)

== Mixed Martial Arts ==
Miami has hosted high-profile Mixed Martial Arts bouts at the Kaseya Center including the following notable bouts:

- UFC 42: Sudden Impact (2003)
- Ortiz vs. Shamrock 3: The Final Chapter (2006)
- UFC Fight Night: Evans vs. Salmon (2007)
- UFC Fight Night: Stout vs. Fisher (2007)
- EliteXC: Street Certified (2008)
- EliteXC: Heat (2008)
- WEC 36: Faber vs. Brown (2008)
- Strikeforce: Miami (2010)
- UFC on FX: Johnson vs. McCall 2 (2012)
- World Series of Fighting 8: Gaethje vs. Patishnock (2014)
- UFC Fight Night: Machida vs. Romero (2015)
- Bellator: Monster Energy Fight Series: Homestead (2017)
- UFC Fight Night: Jacaré vs. Hermansson (2019)
- PFL 7 (2021)
- PFL 8 (2021)
- PFL 9 (2021)
- PFL 10 (2021)
- Bellator 271: Cyborg vs. Kavanagh (2021)
- Eagle FC 44: Spong vs. Kharitonov (2022)
- UFC 287: Pereira vs. Adesanya 2 (2023)
- UFC 299: O'Malley vs. Vera 2 (2024)
- PFL 8 (2024)
- UFC 314: Volkanovski vs Lopes (2025)
- PFL 10 (2025)
- UFC 327: Procházka vs. Ulberg (2026)

== Wrestling ==
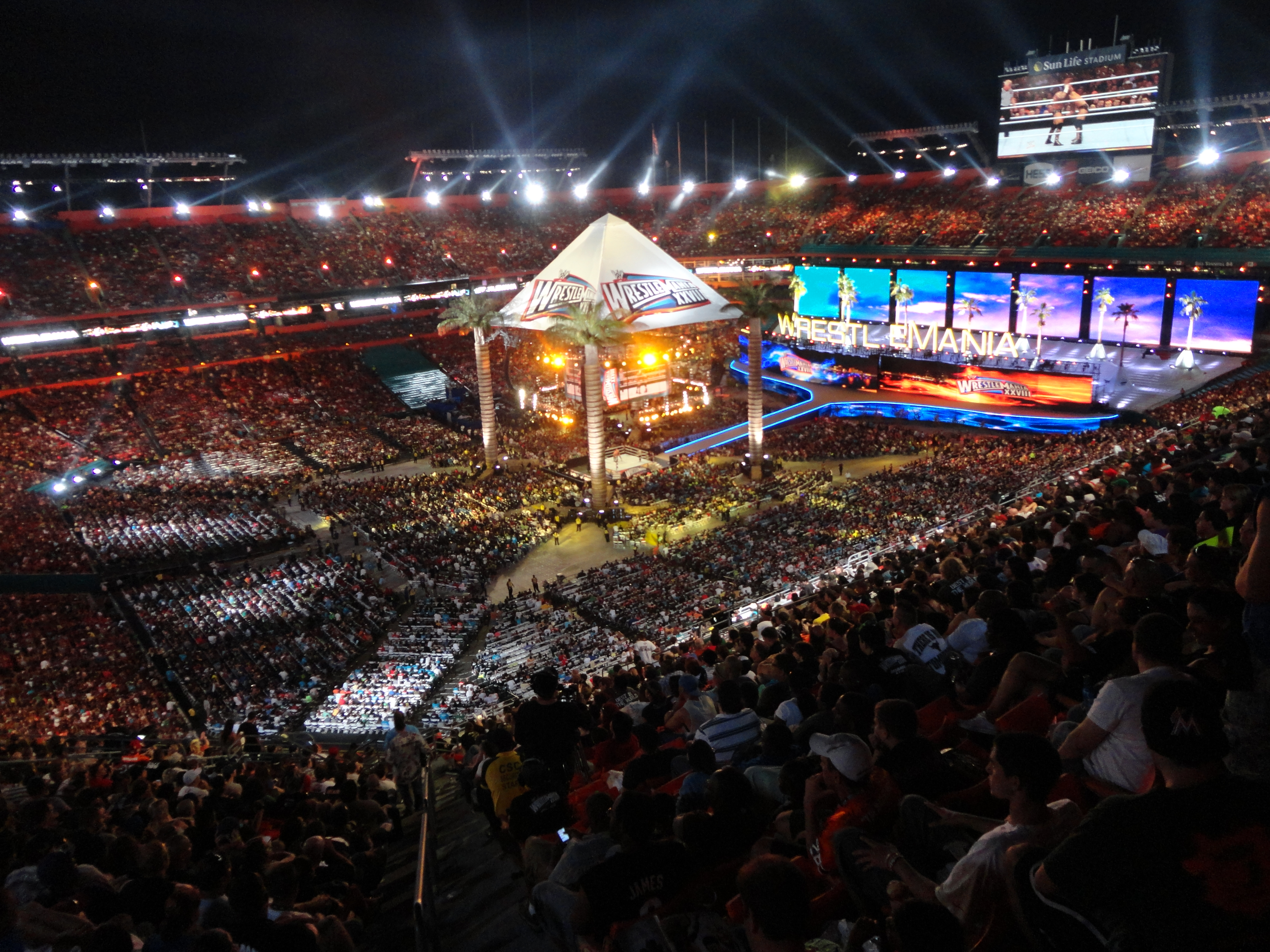
A record at the time, 78,363 fans packed Sun Life Stadium for WrestleMania XXVIII in April 2012.

Miami has hosted well known high-profile wrestling event bouts by WWE, WWE SmackDown, SmackDown (WWE brand), WWE Raw, Raw (WWE brand), WWE ECW, ECW (WWE brand), World Championship Wrestling, Extreme Championship Wrestling, All Elite Wrestling, Total Nonstop Action Wrestling, New Japan Pro-Wrestling, National Wrestling Alliance, Ring of Honor Wrestling, & Ring of Honor.

- WrestleMania XXVIII (2012)
- Superbowl of Wrestling (1978)
- NWA The Great American Bash supercard (1987)
- WarGames match (1987)
- Clash of the Champions (1988)
- In Your House 12: It's Time (1996)
- Hardcore Heaven (1997)
- WWE Hall of Fame (2012)
- Survivor Series (2010)
- Survivor Series (2007)
- Royal Rumble (1991)
- Royal Rumble (2006)
- Armageddon (1999)
- Armageddon (2002)
- Hell in a Cell (2013)
- Bash at the Beach (1999)
- Uncensored (2000)
- Lockdown (2014)
- AEW Bash at the Beach (2020)
- Road Rager (2021)
- Chris Jericho's Rock 'N' Wrestling Rager at Sea (2018–present)
- NJPW The New Beginning (2020)
- ROH Bound By Honor (2019)
- Showdown in the Sun (2012)
- MLW King of Kings (2002)
- WarGames (2003)
- WarGames (2018)
- NWA Paranoia (2024)
- NXT No Mercy (2025)
- RAF 05 (2026)

== 2017 International Champions Cup ==
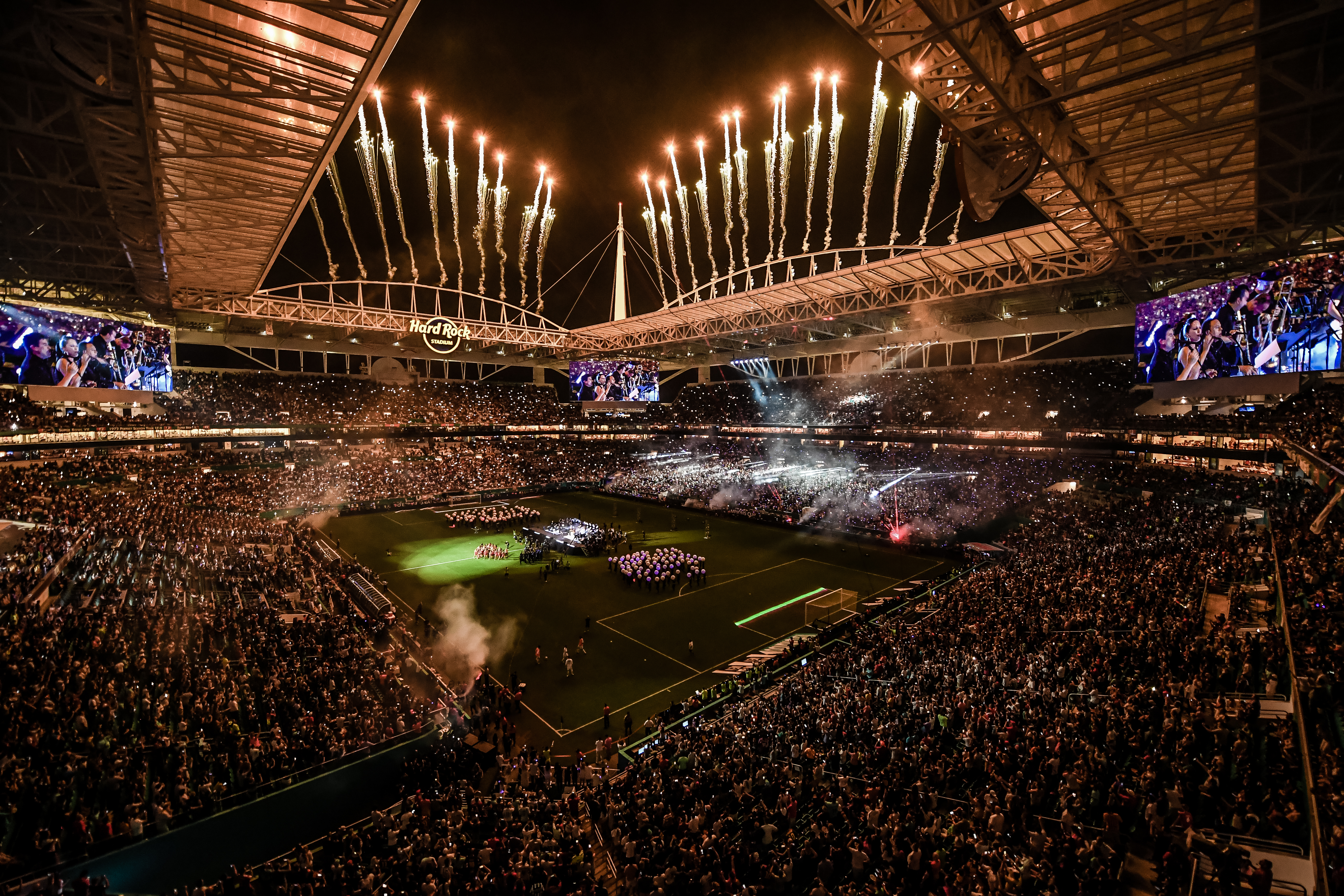
El Clásico at Hard Rock Stadium, July 2017

Miami hosted a duel match of El Clásico between FC Barcelona and Real Madrid CF for the 2017 International Champions Cup on 29 July 2017 at the Hard Rock Stadium.

== 2024 Copa América ==
Miami hosted 2024 Copa América matches including the Final at the Hard Rock Stadium.

== 2025 FIFA Club World Cup ==
Miami hosted some matches of the 2025 FIFA Club World Cup including ones with Inter Miami CF vs Al Ahly SC and SE Palmeiras at the Hard Rock Stadium.

== 2026 FIFA World Cup ==
Miami was one of eleven US host cities for the 2026 FIFA World Cup with matches played at Hard Rock Stadium.

== Miami Sports License Plates ==
They also have license plates in Florida for teams sports in miami which includes:

Image	Type	First issued (redesigned)	Serial format(s)	Notes
	Miami Dolphins	1995-04-01 (2015)	D1234; D123B; D12BC; D1BCD	
	Miami Heat	1995-06-01 (2018)	L1234; L123B; L12BC; L1BCD; LBC12	
	Miami Marlins (Florida Marlins prior to 2012)	1995-07-01 (2019)	E1234; E123B; E12BC	
	University of Miami	1989-10-01	H1234; H123B; H12BC; HBC1D; X12BC; FD1CD	
	Florida Panthers	1995-06-01 (2017) (2023)	P1234; P123B; PB1 234; 12PBC	
	Inter Miami CF	August 28, 2025	JBC12	
	Florida International University	October 1, 1987 (February 19, 2025)	I1234; I123B; I12BC	
	Florida Atlantic University	1987-10-01 (February 19, 2025)	A1234; A123B	
	Nova Southeastern University	2002-10-01	S1BC	
	Barry University	1998-07-01	AB12C	
	Palm Beach Atlantic University	2002-10-01	F1BC	
	Lynn University	2002-10-01	E1BC	
	Keiser University	2015 (November 1, 2021)	123NB; CZC12	

== Other sport traditions and events ==
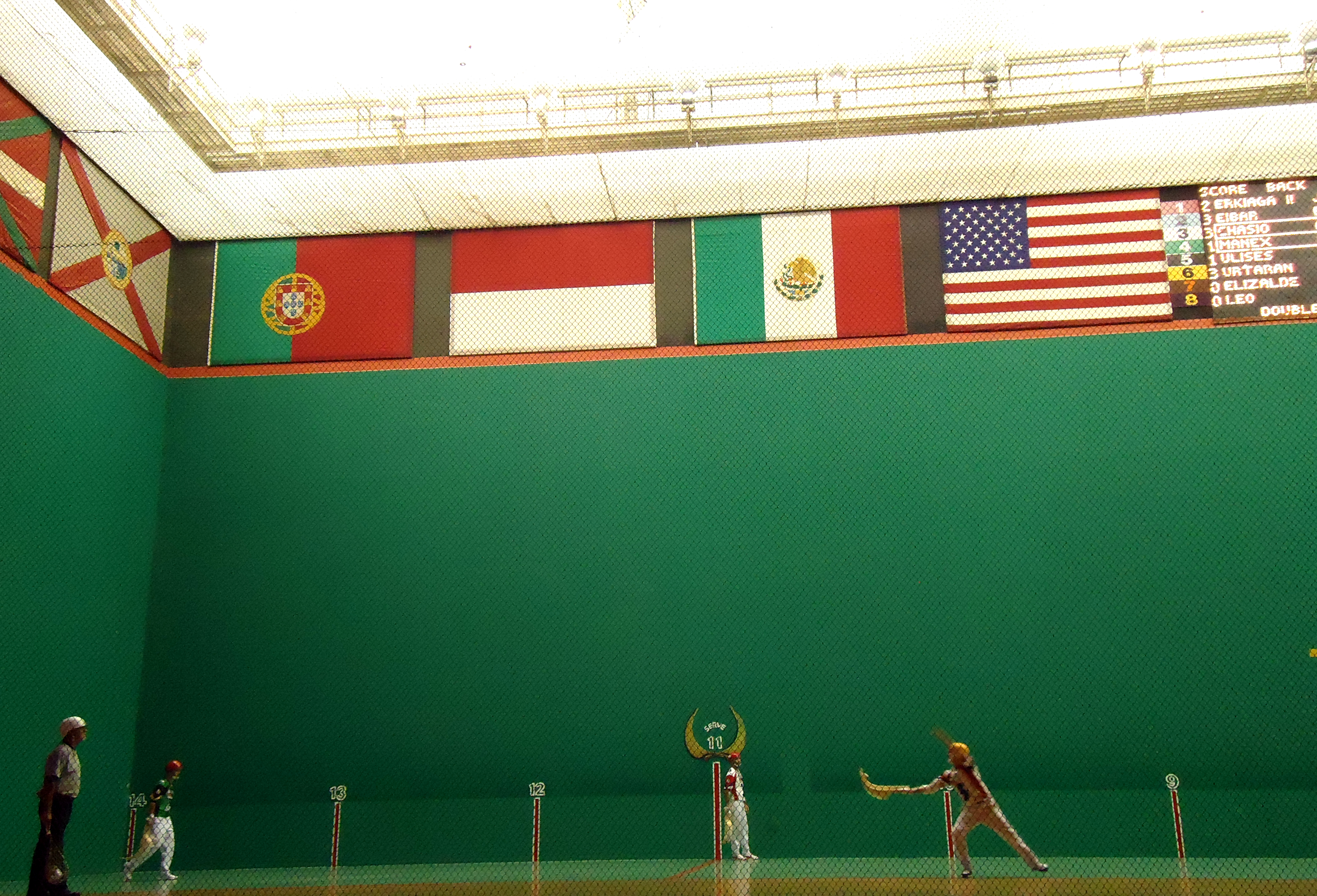
Dania Jai Alai in The Casino @ Dania Beach

There are other sport events that take place in South Florida or Miami includes:

- Alligator wrestling
- Mahi-mahi fishing
- Marlin fishing
- Big-game fishing
- Game fish
- Urban fishing
- Flats fishing
- Recreational fishing
- Offshore powerboat racing
- Boat racing
- Extreme ironing
- Touch (sport)
- Footvolley
- Basque pelota
- Jai alai
- Academic Games
- League of American Bicyclists
- 2025 Miami Slam
- Goodyear Blimp
- Air & Sea Show
- Airboat
- Swamp buggy
- Wheelchair tennis
- Seven Mile Bridge Run
- Miami Marathon
- Swim Miami
- Wodapalooza
- Marlboro Cup
- Tropical Hockey League
- Greyhound racing in the United States
- World Salsa Championships
- United States Dance Championships
- 52 Super Series
- Haulover Park
- Bunche Park, Florida
- Miami Open (tennis)
- Miami Open
- Miami Grand Prix (tennis)
- Jetboard (Hydroflight Sports)
- World Outgames
- Gay and Lesbian International Sport Association
- Legends Cup (LFL)
- Más+
- MLS Combine
- WGC Championship
- Hong Kong v Inter Miami
- The Calhoun Shot
- Roy Halladay's perfect game
- Steve Bartman incident
- Miracle in Miami
- Epic in Miami
- Snowplow Game
- Monday Night Miracle (American football)
- Announcerless game
- Clock Play
- The Sea of Hands
- Confusion Bowl
- Florida Cup
- Whammy in Miami
- Hail Flutie
- Wide Right I
- Wide Right II
- FIU–Miami football brawl
- Formula One
- NASCAR
- Gumball 3000
- Homestead–Miami Speedway
- NASCAR Championship Weekend
- NASCAR Xfinity Series at Homestead–Miami
- NASCAR Cup Series at Homestead–Miami Speedway
- NASCAR Craftsman Truck Series at Homestead–Miami
- Miami Indy Challenge
- Race of Champions
- Hialeah Turf Cup Handicap
- Seminole Handicap
- Palm Beach Handicap
- Black Helen Handicap
- Flamingo Stakes
- Gulfstream Park Turf Sprint Stakes
- International Swimming Hall of Fame
- Florida Sports Hall of Fame
- Beach Soccer Worldwide
- Friendship Four
- FIFA
- CONCACAF
- CONCACAF Gold Cup
- FIBA Americas
- 2026 College Football Playoff National Championship
- 2026 NASCAR Craftsman Truck Series
- 2026 NASCAR Cup Series
- 2026 Formula One World Championship
- 2025–26 Formula E World Championship
- 2026 PGA Tour
- 2026 NHL Winter Classic
- 2026 World Baseball Classic
- United 2026 FIFA World Cup bid
- 2026 FIFA World Cup
- 2025 FIFA Club World Cup
- 2025 WTA Tour
- 2025 Straight Talk Wireless 400
- 2025 Miami ePrix
- MLS Cup 2025
- 2024 Copa América final halftime show
- 2024 Copa América final
- 2024 Copa América
- 2024 Formula One World Championship
- 2024 Baptist Health 200
- 2023 Contender Boats 300
- 2023 World Baseball Classic championship
- 2023 World Baseball Classic
- 2023 National Hockey League All-Star Game
- 2022 American Athletic Conference men's soccer tournament
- 2022 World Polo Championship
- 2022 Miami Grand Prix
- 2021 Walker Cup
- 2021 College Football Playoff National Championship
- 2020 USATF U20 Outdoor Championships
- 2019 USATF U20 Outdoor Championships
- 2017 Major League Baseball All-Star Game
- 2017 World Baseball Classic
- 2017 International Champions Cup
- 2017 Race of Champions
- 2015 FIFA corruption case
- 2015 Miami ePrix
- 2014 Florida Winter Series
- 2014 International Champions Cup
- 2013 Judo Grand Prix Miami
- 2013 World Judo Cadets Championships
- 2013 World Baseball Classic – Qualifier 1
- 2013 World Baseball Classic
- 2013 BCS National Championship Game
- 2011 World Football Challenge
- 2010 Sony Ericsson Open
- 2010 WGC-CA Championship
- 2010 Pro Bowl
- 2009 World Baseball Classic
- 2009 Sony Ericsson Open
- 2003 NHL All-Star Game
- 2001 MLS SuperDraft
- 2000 Marlboro Grand Prix of Miami
- 1999 Lipton Championships
- 1999 NAIA World Series
- 1999 Marlboro Grand Prix of Miami
- 1998 Marlboro Grand Prix of Miami
- 1998 Pan American Race Walking Cup
- 1990 Lipton International Players Championships
- 1996 Summer Olympics
- 1994 NCAA Division I men's basketball tournament
- 1990 Recopa Sudamericana
- 1990 NBA All Star Game
- Football at the 1996 Summer Olympics – Men's tournament
- 1988 Notre Dame vs. Miami football game
- 1987 Fiesta Bowl
- 1983 Ryder Cup
- 1975 Pro Bowl
- 1971 PGA Championship
- 1969 USA Outdoor Track and Field Championships
- 1965 PGA Tour Qualifying School graduates
- 1954 NASCAR Grand National Series
- NASL Final 1974
- Miami International Autodrome
- Miami International Boat Show
- Miami International Auto Show
- Miami International Four-Ball
- Grand Prix of Miami
- Miami Grand Prix
- Grand Prix of Miami (sports car racing)
- Grand Prix of Miami (open wheel racing)
- Grand Prix Americas
- Palm Beach International Raceway
- West Palm Beach Open Invitational
- West Palm Beach street circuit
- Boca West International
- Boca West Open
- Baptist Health 200
- TYR Pro Swim Series
- WTA Premier tournaments
- Mosler Automotive
- DDR Motorsport
- Formula (boats)
- Magnum Marine
- National Polo Center
- Miami ePrix
- Super Bowl II
- Super Bowl III
- Super Bowl V
- Super Bowl X
- Super Bowl XIII
- Super Bowl XXIII
- Super Bowl XXIX
- Super Bowl XXXIII
- Super Bowl XLI
- Super Bowl XLIV
- Super Bowl LIV
- Orange Bowl
- Orange Blossom Classic
- Orange Bowl (tennis)
- Junior Orange Bowl
- Playoff Bowl
- Heritage Bowl
- Miami Beach Bowl
- Shula Bowl
- FCS Bowl
- Florida Beach Bowl
- Boca Raton Bowl
- Pop-Tarts Bowl
- New Year's Six
- ACC Championship Game
- BMW Tennis Championship
- Miami Beach Open
- Miami Open (golf)
- Doral Open
- LIV Golf Miami
- La Gorce Open
- Serbin Open
- Virginia Slims of Hollywood
- Hollywood Lakes Open
- Palm Beach County Open
- Palm Beach Cup
- Cognizant Classic
- Delray Beach Open
- Delray Beach International Tennis Championships
- Chrysler Team Championship
- Coral Gables Open Invitational
- Coral Springs Open Invitational
- Royal Caribbean Golf Classic
- Royal Poinciana Invitational
- Stanford International Pro-Am
- Everglades Stakes
- Sunshine State Games
- Sunshine Open Invitational
- Sunshine Women's Open
- Elizabeth Arden Classic
- National Airlines Open Invitational
- Kenny Noe Jr. Handicap
- Miami Air International
- North–South Shrine Game
- PGA of America
- International Woman's Flag Football Association
- Sony Ericsson Open
- TGL (golf league)
- The Match (golf)
- Kill Cliff FC
- Fight Sports
- Championship Fighting Alliance
- Coastal Championship Wrestling
- Boca Raton Championship Wrestling
- BKB Bare Knuckle Boxing
- Bare Knuckle Fighting Championship
- Women's International Boxing Federation
- Miccosukee Championship
- WrestleReunion
- National Team Championship
- USA International
- US Sailing's Miami Olympic Classes Regatta
- United States men's national beach soccer team
- American Skier Inboard Boats
- Southern Pro Championships
- South Florida Classic
- South Florida Open Championships
- City of Miami Championships
- International Game Fish Association
- Super Bowl XXIII halftime show
- Super Bowl XXXIII halftime show
- Super Bowl XLI halftime show
- Super Bowl XLIV halftime show
- Super Bowl LIV halftime show

== Media ==
Miami also has many radios, networks and podcasts that speak or talk about their sports and team club franchises.

- Miami Marlins Radio Network
- WQAM
- WQAM-FM
- WINZ (AM)
- WAXY (AM)
- WAMI-DT
- WQBA
- WLRN-FM
- WKIS
- WPLG
- WMEN
- WTVJ
- WVUM
- WPST-TV
- WFOR-TV
- WBFS-TV
- WPTV-TV
- WGBS-TV
- WSFL-TV
- WPBT
- WIOD
- WSVN
- WAVK
- WSCV
- WRGP
- Telemundo
- Univision
- Miami Herald
- Miami New Times
- The Miami Hurricane
- CBS News Miami
- NBC Sports Regional Networks
- FanDuel Sports Network Florida
- FanDuel Sports Network Sun
- FanDuel Sports Network
- Fanatics, Inc.
- Fanatiz
- Premier League Productions
- Relevent
- Fox Sports
- Fox Sports Radio
- Fox Sports Networks
- Ares Management

== Films & Television ==
There are also movies, films, documentaries, and television shows about the sports teams of Miami that includes:

- Ace Ventura: Pet Detective
- Any Given Sunday
- Ali (2001 film)
- Raging Bull
- The Roses (film)
- Hard Knocks (documentary series)
- Woodlawn (film)
- Elway to Marino
- Catholics vs. Convicts (film)
- The U (film)
- QB1: Beyond the Lights
- The Rebound (2016 film)
- The Decision (TV program)
- Spooked (The Office)
- Starting 5
- Shaquille (TV series)
- The Franchise (2011 TV series)
- Ballers
- Inside the NFL
- Whale Whores
- The Dan Le Batard Show with Stugotz
- Highly Questionable
- Spittin' Chiclets
- Top Gear: US Special
- Pros vs. Joes
- The Big Break

== See also ==
- Sports in Florida
- U.S. cities with teams from four major sports
