= USGP =

USGP may refer to:

- United States Grand Prix, a race for the Formula One automobile racing series
- United States motorcycle Grand Prix, a race for the MotoGP motorcycle racing series
- Green Party (United States), a political party in the United States

== See also ==
- U.S. 500 (disambiguation)
- Grand Prix of America
- United States Grand Prix (disambiguation)
- American Grand Prix (disambiguation)
