= South Florida PGA Championship =

USA golf competition

The South Florida PGA Championship is a golf tournament that is the championship of the South Florida section of the PGA of America. The tournament has been played annually since 1979, the year the section was founded. Alan Morin and Paul Trittler have the most victories with three. PGA Tour winners who have also won the South Florida PGA Championship include Bruce Fleischer (twice), Julius Boros, Bob Murphy, and Tom Shaw.

== Winners ==
Year	Champion	Venue	Location
2026	Tyler Collet	Quail Valley Golf Club; Orchid Island Golf Club	Vero Beach, Florida
2025	Michael Kartrude	The Park	West Palm Beach, Florida
2024	Andrew Filbert	Imperial Golf Club – East, West	Naples, Florida
2023	Tyler Collet	BallenIsles – East	Palm Beach Gardens, Florida
2022	Tim Cantwell	Imperial Golf Club – East	Naples, Florida
2021	Taylor Collins	BallenIsles Country Club (East & South courses)	Palm Beach Gardens, Florida
2020	Tyler Collet	Broken Sound Club; Plantation Preserve Golf Club	Boca Raton, Florida
2019	Justin Bertsch	Quail Valley Golf Club; Bent Pine Golf Club	Vero Beach, Florida
2018	Kyle Sanders	The Club at Mediterra	Naples, Florida
2017	Andrew Filbert	McArthur Golf Club; Turtle Creek Club	Hobe Sound, Florida; Tequesta, Florida
2016	Alan Morin	Wyndemere Country Club	Naples, Florida
2015	Alan Morin	Verandah Golf Club	Fort Myers, Florida
2014	Paul Scaletta	Orchid Island Club; Hawks Nest Golf Club	Vero Beach, Florida
2013	Jay Westerlund	Jupiter Hills Club	Jupiter, Florida
2012	Chad Kurmel	Sailfish Point Golf Club; Willoughby Golf Club	Stuart, Florida
2011	Chris Kaufman	Hideout Golf Club; Wyndemere Country Club	Naples, Florida
2010	Alan Morin	Ritz-Carlton Jupiter; Frenchman's Reserve	Jupiter, Florida
2009	Ryan Garrity	Bear Lakes Country Club	West Palm Beach, Florida
2008	Alan Morin	Breakers Rees Jones; PGA National Champion Course	West Palm Beach, Florida; Palm Beach Gardens, Florida
2007	Ryan Garrity	McArthur Golf Club; Hobe Sound Country Club	Hobe Sound, Florida
2006	Lee Rinker	Country Club at Mirasol; Old Palm Golf Club	Palm Beach Gardens, Florida
2005	Mike San Filippo	The Bear's Club; Bear Lakes Country Club	Jupiter, Florida
2004	Gene Fieger	Grey Oaks Country Club	Naples, Florida
2003	Lee Rinker	Imperial Golf Club – East	Naples, Florida
2002	Alan Morin	Ballen Isles Country Club	West Palm Beach, Florida
2001	Peter Baxter	Fort Lauderdale Country Club	Plantation, Florida
2000	Gene Fieger	Bear Lakes Country Club; Ibis Golf and Country Club	West Palm Beach, Florida
1999	Chris Toulson	Lely Resort – The Classics and Flamingo Courses	Naples, Florida
1998	Chris Campbell	Weston Hills Golf and Country Club	Weston, Florida
1997	Gene George	Frenchman's Creek Golf Club	Palm Beach Gardens, Florida
1996	John Nelson	Bear Lakes Country Club	West Palm Beach, Florida
1995	John Lee	Bonita Bay Club	Bonita Springs, Florida
1994	Bill Kennedy	Bear Lakes Country Club	West Palm Beach, Florida
1993	Paul Trittler	Ibis Golf & Country Club	West Palm Beach, Florida
1992	Greg Cerulli	Hobe Sound Golf Club	Hobe Sound, Florida
1991	Paul Trittler	Cypress Links Golf Club	St. Petersburg, Florida
1990	Greg Cerulli	Loblolly Pine Golf Club	Hobe Sound, Florida
1989	Paul Trittler	Doral Resort – Blue Monster	Doral, Florida
1988	Tom Shaw	Palm Beach Polo	Wellington, Florida
1987	Bruce Fleisher	Bonita Bay Club	Bonita Springs, Florida
1986	Ed Rodgers	Bonita Bay Club	Bonita Springs, Florida
1985	Ed Rodgers	Hunters Run Golf Club	Boynton Beach, Florida
1984	Roger Kennedy	Hunters Run Golf Club	Boynton Beach, Florida
1983	John Elliott, Jr.	Hunters Run Golf Club	Boynton Beach, Florida
1982	Jack Seltzer	Hunters Run Golf Club	Boynton Beach, Florida
1981	Bruce Fleisher	Hunters Run Golf Club	Boynton Beach, Florida
1980	Bob Murphy	Hunters Run Golf Club	Boynton Beach, Florida
1979	Julius Boros	Turnberry Isle CC	Aventura, Florida
