= Lee Rinker =

American professional golfer (born 1960)

Personal information
- Full name: Lee Cross Rinker
- Nationality: United States
- Born: November 10, 1960 (age 65) Stuart, Florida, U.S.
- Height: 6 ft 0 in (1.83 m)
- Weight: 185 lb (84 kg; 13.2 st)

Career
- Sport: Golf
- College: University of Alabama
- Turned professional: 1983
- Current tour: Champions Tour
- Former tours: PGA Tour; Nationwide Tour
- Professional wins: 3

Best results in major championships
- Masters Tournament: DNP
- PGA Championship: T29: 1998
- U.S. Open: T33: 1993
- The Open Championship: DNP

Lee Cross Rinker (born November 10, 1960) is an American professional golfer.

== Early life and amateur career ==
In 1960, Rinker was born in Stuart, Florida. Rinker's brother, Larry, and his sister, Laurie, also became professional golfers.

Rinker played college golf at the University of Alabama.

== Professional career ==
In 1983, Rinker turned professional. Rinker had success at 1983 PGA Tour Qualifying School. However, he struggled to keep his card. His best year came in 1997, when he finished second twice, and made nearly $500,000. However, his struggles continued, and he has not made a cut on the PGA Tour since 1999. He has played on the Nationwide Tour for many years. In November 2010, he earned his 2011 Champions Tour card by finishing second at qualifying school.

Rinker is currently the Director of Golf at the Emerald Dunes Club in West Palm Beach, Florida.

== Personal life ==
Rinker's sister-in-law Kelli, wife of older brother Laine, was also on the LPGA Tour.

== Tournament wins ==
this list may be incomplete

- 2003 South Florida PGA Championship
- 2006 South Florida PGA Championship
- 2008 EZ-Go South Florida PGA Open

== Results in major championships ==
Tournament	1983	1984	1985	1986	1987	1988	1989
U.S. Open	CUT		T58				
PGA Championship							

Tournament	1990	1991	1992	1993	1994	1995	1996	1997	1998	1999
U.S. Open				T33				CUT		
PGA Championship		CUT	T56				T52	T61	T29	

Tournament	2000	2001	2002	2003	2004	2005	2006	2007	2008	2009
U.S. Open						CUT				
PGA Championship							CUT			CUT

Note: Rinker never played in the Masters Tournament nor The Open Championship.

Did not play

CUT = missed the half-way cut
"T" = tied

== U.S. national team appearances ==
- PGA Cup: 1992 (winners), 2007 (winners), 2009 (winners)

== See also ==
- 1983 PGA Tour Qualifying School graduates
- 1994 PGA Tour Qualifying School graduates
