= Tom Shaw (golfer) =

American professional golfer (born 1938)

Personal information
- Full name: Thomas G. Shaw
- Nationality: United States
- Born: December 13, 1938 (age 87) Wichita, Kansas
- Height: 5 ft 10 in (1.78 m)
- Weight: 180 lb (82 kg; 13 st)

Career
- Sport: Golf
- College: University of Oregon
- Turned professional: 1962
- Former tours: PGA Tour; Champions Tour
- Professional wins: 8

Number of wins by tour
- PGA Tour: 4
- PGA Tour Champions: 2
- Other: 2

Best results in major championships
- Masters Tournament: T36: 1971
- PGA Championship: T21: 1969
- U.S. Open: T25: 1973
- The Open Championship: T28: 1970

Thomas G. Shaw (born December 13, 1938) is an American professional golfer. He played on the PGA Tour and the Champions Tour.

== Early life and amateur career ==
In 1938, Shaw was born in Wichita, Kansas. He attended the University of Oregon in Eugene from 1959–1962, and was an All-American member of the golf team. He helped Oregon win the Pacific Coast Conference title in 1959. In 1962, Shaw graduated.

== Professional career ==
In 1962, Shaw turned pro. He joined the PGA Tour the following year. Shaw won four PGA Tour events and had over two dozen top-10 finishes. In 1966, he was seriously injured in a car accident on the way to the Bob Hope Classic. In 1971, he won twice, earned $96,220, and finished 15th on the money list. His best finish in a major was a T-21 at the 1969 PGA Championship.

Shaw began play on the Senior PGA Tour in 1989, and was one of five rookies to win on tour that year. His two wins on the senior tour included one senior major, at The Tradition in 1993 when he defeated Mike Hill by one stroke. He has over two dozen top-10 finishes at this level also.

Shaw claimed throughout his career on the PGA Tour to be four years younger than the age in some record books. He was suspected by some of being older, notably by Frank Hannigan, who as Executive Director of the United States Golf Association paired him with the then-19-year-old Ben Crenshaw and 24-year-old Johnny Miller, both known as fast players, for the first two rounds of the 1971 U.S. Open for his apparent amusement. As it turned out, Hannigan was right; in 1988, Shaw produced a birth certificate proving that he had been born on the same date in 1938, which made him eligible for the Senior PGA Tour starting with the 1989 season.

== Personal life ==
Shaw lives in Fort Lauderdale, Florida.

== Awards and honors ==
In 1997, Shaw was inducted into the University of Oregon Athletics Hall of Fame

== Professional wins (8) ==
=== PGA Tour wins (4) ===
No.	Date	Tournament	Winning score	Margin of victory	Runner-up
1	Mar 2, 1969	Doral Open Invitational	−12 (65-70-71-70=276)	1 stroke	(United States) Tommy Aaron
2	Aug 24, 1969	AVCO Golf Classic	−4 (68-68-67-77=280)	1 stroke	(Australia) Bob Stanton
3	Jan 17, 1971	Bing Crosby National Pro-Am	−13 (68-71-69-70=278)	2 strokes	(United States) Arnold Palmer
4	Feb 7, 1971	Hawaiian Open	−15 (68-67-69-69=273)	1 stroke	(United States) Miller Barber

=== Other wins (1) ===
- 1988 South Florida PGA Championship

=== Senior PGA Tour wins (2) ===
Legend
Senior PGA Tour major championships (1)
Other Senior PGA Tour (1)

No.	Date	Tournament	Winning score	Margin of victory	Runner-up
1	Aug 6, 1989	Showdown Classic	−9 (69-68-70=207)	1 stroke	(United States) Larry Mowry
2	Apr 4, 1993	The Tradition	−19 (70-65-67-67=269)	1 stroke	(United States) Mike Hill

=== Other senior wins (1) ===
- 1989 Senior Slam of Golf at Querétaro

== Champions Tour major championships ==
=== Wins (1) ===
Year	Championship	Winning score	Margin	Runner-up
1993	The Tradition	−19 (70-65-67-67=269)	1 stroke	(United States) Mike Hill
