= Magnus Goodman =

Icelandic-Canadian athlete

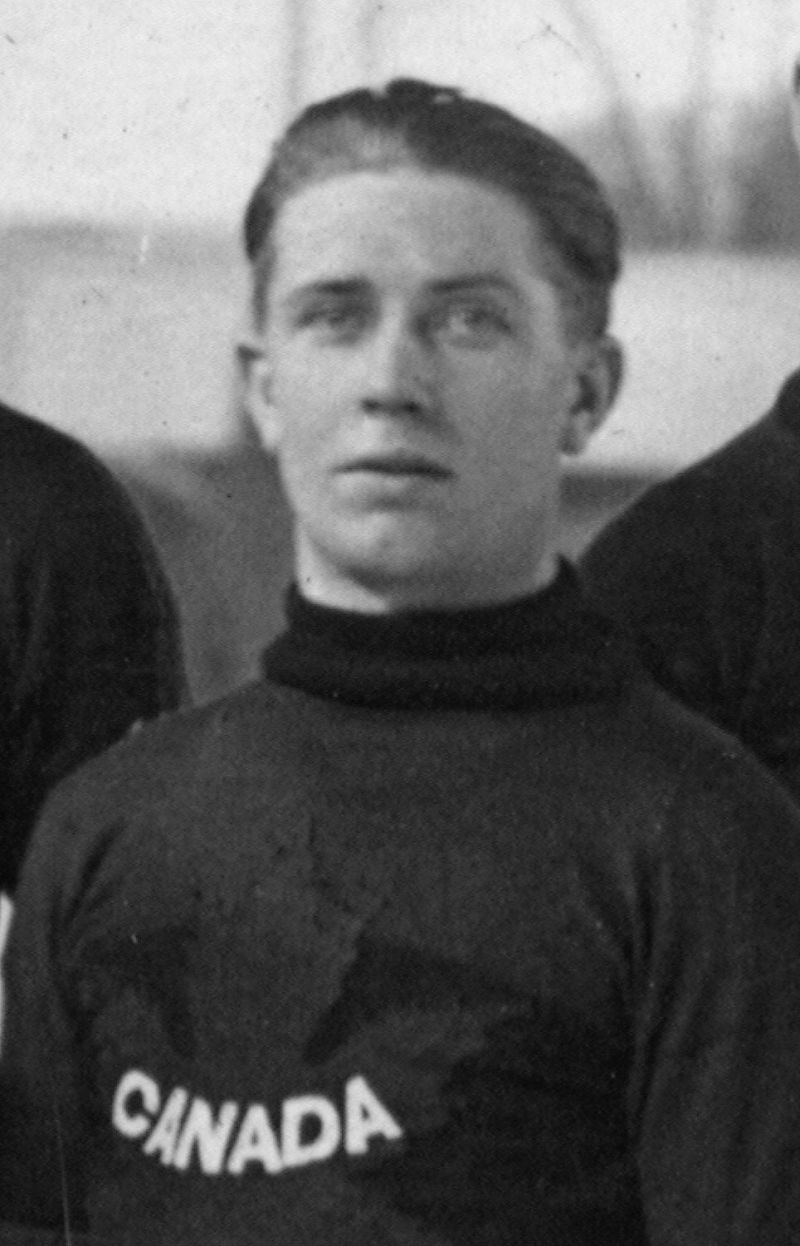
- Goodman at the 1920 Olympics.
- Born: March 18, 1898 Winnipeg, Manitoba, Canada
- Died: July 18, 1991 (aged 93) Dade City, Florida, U.S.
- Height: 5 ft 7 in (170 cm)
- Weight: 163 lb (74 kg; 11 st 9 lb)
- Position: Left wing
- Shot: Left
- Played for: Selkirk Fishermen; Winnipeg Falcons; Duluth Hornets; Kansas City Pla-Mors; Wichita Blue Jays; Kansas City Greyhounds; Wichita Skyhawks; Coral-Gables Seminoles
- National team: Canada
- Playing career: 1917–1939
Medal record
Olympic Games
Gold medal – first place	1920 Antwerp	Team

Magnus "Mike" Goodman (18 March 1898 – 18 July 1991) was an Icelandic-Canadian athlete. He was a member of the Winnipeg Falcons ice hockey team, who represented Canada at the 1920 Summer Olympics and won the gold medal.

== Life ==
Goodman was born in 1898 to Icelandic immigrant Gísli Guðmundsson and Ólöf Björnsdóttir. He distinguished himself in ice hockey as well as swimming and speed skating. As a young man he joined the Winnipeg Falcons, an amateur hockey team largely made up of Icelanders excluded from Winnipeg's other teams. His position was left wing. In 1920 the team won the Allan Cup and the right to represent Canada at the 1920 Summer Olympics, the first Olympic Games to feature hockey. The Falcons went on to defeat Sweden to win the gold medal.

In 1938 he served as player-coach for the Coral Gables Seminoles of the Miami-based Tropical Hockey League, an early attempt to establish Hockey in the Southern United States. He died in Miami in 1991 at the age of 93, the last surviving member of the Winnipeg Falcons.

== Awards and achievements ==
- Allan Cup Championship (1920)
- Olympic Gold Medalist (1920)
- AHA Championships (1927 & 1934)
- "Honoured Member" of the Manitoba Hockey Hall of Fame

== Career statistics ==
=== Regular season and playoffs ===
			Regular season					Playoffs
Season	Team	League	GP	G	A	Pts	PIM	GP	G	A	Pts	PIM
1919–20	Winnipeg Falcons	MHL-M	statistics unavailable					—	—	—	—	—
1919–20	Winnipeg Falcons	Al-Cup	statistics unavailable					—	—	—	—	—
1923–24	Duluth Rangers	USAHA	statistics unavailable					—	—	—	—	—
1925–26	Duluth Hornets	CHL	32	5	3	8	8	—	—	—	—	—
1926–27	Duluth Hornets	AHA	38	15	4	19	6	—	—	—	—	—
1927–28	Duluth Hornets	AHA	40	5	4	9	6	—	—	—	—	—
1928–29	Duluth Hornets	AHA	38	3	3	6	6	—	—	—	—	—
1929–30	Duluth Hornets	AHA	47	4	11	15	16	—	—	—	—	—
1930–31	Duluth Hornets	AHA	3	0	0	0	0	—	—	—	—	—
1930–31	Kansas City Pla-Mors	AHA	41	12	3	15	28	—	—	—	—	—
1931–32	Kansas City Pla-Mors	AHA	45	9	7	16	8	—	—	—	—	—
1932–33	Duluth Hornets / Wichita Blue Jays	AHA	40	19	3	22	14	—	—	—	—	—
1933–34	Kansas City Greyhounds	AHA	38	8	8	16	22	—	—	—	—	—
1934–35	Kansas City Greyhounds	AHA	45	5	7	12	12	—	—	—	—	—
1935–36	Wichita Skyhawks	AHA	41	10	10	20	13	—	—	—	—	—
1936–37	Wichita Skyhawks	AHA	35	8	7	15	11	—	—	—	—	—
1937–38	Wichita Skyhawks	AHA	45	6	8	14	4	—	—	—	—	—
1938–39	Coral Gables Seminoles	THL	14	6	3	9	0	—	—	—	—	—
USAHA/CHL/AHA totals			528	109	78	187	154	—	—	—	—	—

=== International ===
Year	Team	Event	GP	G	A	Pts	PIM
1920	Canada	OG	3	3	0	3	0
Senior totals			3	3	0	3	0

=== Head coaching record ===
Team	Year	Regular season						Postseason
Team	Year	G	W	L	T	Pts	Division Rank	Result
Duluth Hornets / Wichita Blue Jays	1932–33	42	17	24	1	34	4th	Missed playoffs
Kansas City Greyhounds	1933–34	48	26	18	4	52	2nd	Won Championship
Kansas City Greyhounds	1934–35	48	23	25	0	46	2nd	Lost in finals
Wichita Skyhawks	1935–36	48	16	32	0	32	6th	Missed playoffs
Wichita Skyhawks	1935–36	48	18	27	3	36	5th	Missed playoffs
Wichita Skyhawks	1935–36	48	23	21	4	46	3rd	Lost in Round 1
Coral Gables Seminoles	1938–39	14	12	2	0	24	1st (no playoffs)	
Total		296	135	149	12	270		
