= Bob Dill =

American ice hockey player

- Born: April 25, 1920; St. Paul, Minnesota, U.S.
- Died: April 16, 1991 (aged 70); St. Paul, Minnesota, U.S.
- Height: 5 ft 8 in (173 cm)
- Weight: 185 lb (84 kg; 13 st 3 lb)
- Position: Defense
- Shot: Left
- Played for: New York Rangers
- Playing career: 1938–1952

Robert Edward Dill (April 25, 1920 – April 16, 1991) was an American professional ice hockey player. He played 76 games in the National Hockey League with the New York Rangers during the 1943–44 and 1944–45 seasons. The rest of his career, which lasted from 1938 to 1952, was spent in the minor leagues.

== Playing career ==
Dill played professionally in the American Hockey League alongside his boyhood hero, Hockey Hall of Famer Eddie Shore for the Springfield Indians, in the United States Hockey League for the St. Paul Saints and in the National Hockey League for the New York Rangers.

Throughout his hockey career, Bob Dill was considered an intense, but clean player with an aggressive style of play. While with the New York Rangers, Dill's battles with Montreal Canadiens great Maurice "Rocket" Richard were particularly noteworthy. Dill's attempts to intimidate Richard and his teammates left him on the losing sides of dramatic physical confrontations, with the newspapers unable to resist the pun in the resulting news stories, as in "Dill pickled." According to one story, when the Rangers sent Dill to confront Richard, Richard knocked him out with one punch. After Dill regained consciousness, he was sent to the penalty box. When he emerged, he went after Richard again, with the same result; the Rocket needed just a single punch to knock him out. He was depicted in the 2005 French Canadian film The Rocket by then-active NHL forward Sean Avery.

Bob Dill was also a star baseball player with the AAA Minneapolis Millers baseball team. A minor league team of the New York Giants, the Millers organization was the "stopping point" for Ted Williams, Willie Mays and many other greats on their way to the "majors."

Dill was sought by the Giants Major League Baseball organization. Had Dill played for the Giants, he would have been the first (and only) American to play both NHL hockey and Major League Baseball, becoming the first since Canadian-born Jim Riley accomplished the feat in 1921. The proposed contract was rejected, however, by the New York Rangers because the schedules of the two sports overlapped. In that era, the NHL contracts (and professional sports contracts in general) were more restrictive, and with players having far less latitude for making career decisions than they do today.

After the 1944–45 NHL season the New York Rangers sent Dill to the Rangers farm team, the St. Paul Saints, because Dill was a St. Paul native and therefore he would be good for improving attendance, which he did. Dill went on to five more years of successful play for the Saints, He was a 1st team all star in 1947 and 1950 and led the Saints to a USHL Championship in 1948. Fans filled the stands to watch a great rivalry between the St. Paul Saints and the Minneapolis Millers hockey team, one of whose star players was another Minnesota hockey legend, John Mariucci.

== Post-playing career ==
After serving as a player-coach for Shore in Springfield during the 1951–52 season, Dill retired. Following his playing days Dill worked as an NHL scout for the New York Rangers, Chicago Blackhawks, and Minnesota North Stars.

== Career statistics ==
=== Regular season and playoffs ===
			Regular season					Playoffs
Season	Team	League	GP	G	A	Pts	PIM	GP	G	A	Pts	PIM
1938–39	Miami Clippers	THL	14	5	5	10	23	—	—	—	—	—
1939–40	Sault Ste. Marie Greyhounds	NMHL-NA	—	—	—	—	—	—	—	—	—	—
1940–41	Baltimore Orioles	EAHL	56	12	11	23	130	—	—	—	—	—
1941–42	Springfield Indians	AHL	50	8	13	21	106	5	3	2	5	0
1942–43	Buffalo Bisons	AHL	19	2	7	9	46	—	—	—	—	—
1942–43	United States Coast Guard Cutters	EAHL	29	15	20	35	48	11	6	4	10	22
1943–44	New York Rangers	NHL	28	6	10	16	66	—	—	—	—	—
1943–44	Buffalo Bisons	AHL	23	5	9	14	75	—	—	—	—	—
1944–45	New York Rangers	NHL	48	9	5	14	69	—	—	—	—	—
1945–46	St. Paul Saints	USHL	30	11	11	21	62	—	—	—	—	—
1946–47	St. Paul Saints	USHL	58	12	18	30	154	—	—	—	—	—
1947–48	St. Paul Saints	USHL	59	10	34	44	101	—	—	—	—	—
1948–49	St. Paul Saints	USHL	63	15	26	44	134	7	4	1	5	10
1949–50	St. Paul Saints	USHL	52	6	17	23	116	3	0	1	1	0
1950–51	St. Paul 7-Up	AAHL	—	—	—	—	—	—	—	—	—	—
1951–52	Springfield Indians	EAHL	37	3	16	19	58	—	—	—	—	—
NHL totals			76	15	15	30	135	—	—	—	—	—
