= Casino Miami =

Multi purpose arena in Florida

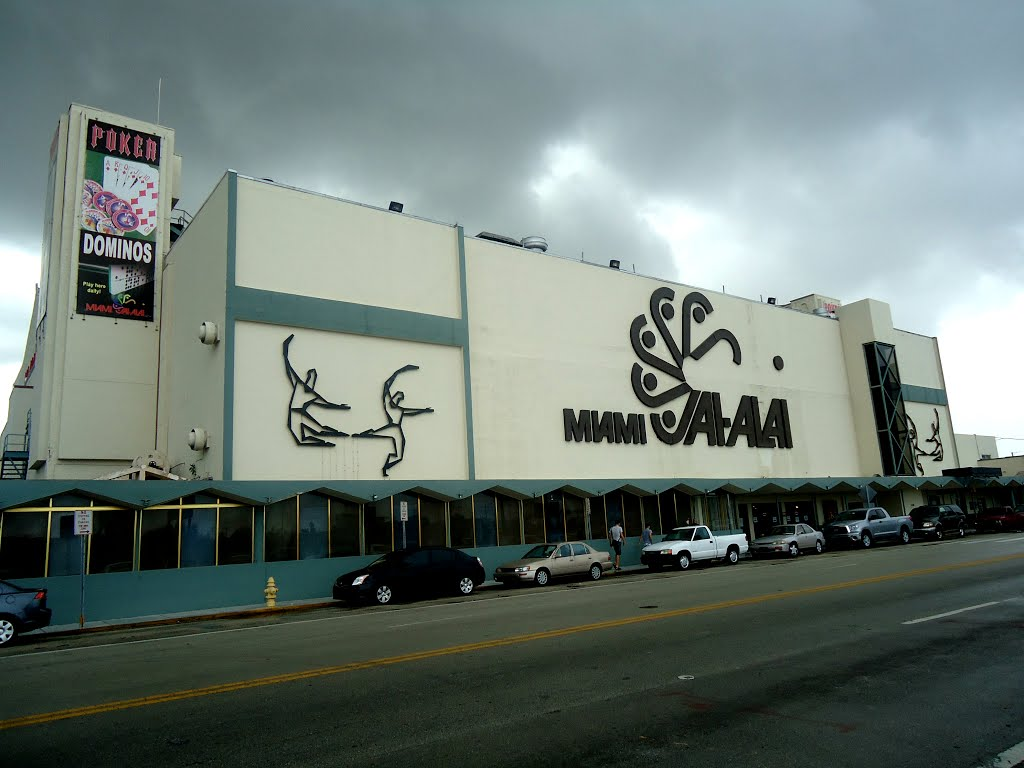
- Façade of the Miami Jai Alai in 2013.
- Interactive map of Casino Miami
- Address: 3500 NW 37th Avenue
- Location: Miami, Florida, U.S.
- Coordinates: 25°48′26.4″N 80°15′25.9″W
- Capacity: 1,500 (2026–present); 6,500 (until 2021)

Construction
- Opened: 2026 (new fronton)
- Closed: 2021 (original fronton)

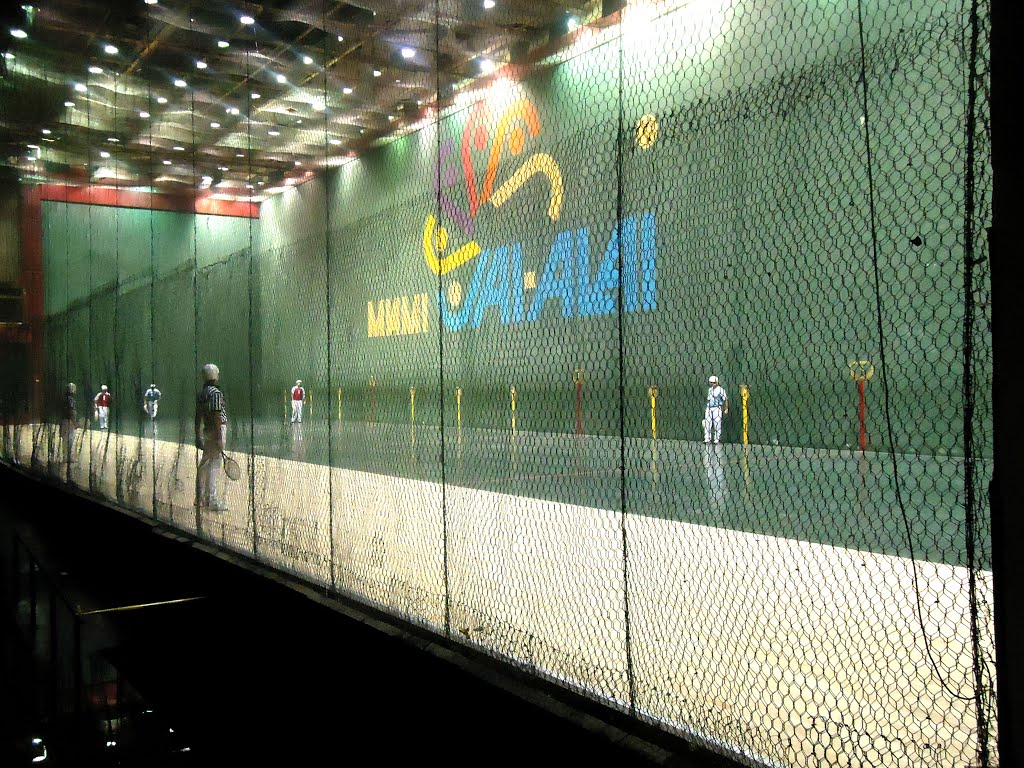
The fronton in 2013.

Casino Miami is a 6,500-capacity indoor arena, casino and jai alai fronton located at 3500 NW 37th Avenue in Miami, Florida. Today, it is primarily used for gambling and concerts. Notable past performers include the Allman Brothers Band, Black Sabbath, Bruce Springsteen, Frank Sinatra, Santana and Grateful Dead. The arena had been used 89 times for boxing events, including many involving famous former world champion boxers. After a bankruptcy, an affiliate of ABC Funding acquired Casino Miami in 2014. Phil Ruffin bought Casino Miami on December 3, 2018.

Its jai alai fronton, the Miami Jai Alai Fronton, operated until its 2021 closure. At its peak in 1975, the fronton drew over 15,000 spectators to watch matches. On February 13, 2026, the fronton reopened with a reduced 1,500-seat capacity for jai-alai and shows as JAM Arena (Jai Alai Miami) with a match of the World Jai-Alai League, which had previously operated out of the Magic City Casino until 2025.

== See also ==
- Sport in Miami
