= Stan Jackson =

Canadian ice hockey player

- Born: August 27, 1898; Parrsboro, Nova Scotia, Canada
- Died: November 28, 1955 (aged 57)
- Height: 6 ft 0 in (183 cm)
- Weight: 180 lb (82 kg; 12 st 12 lb)
- Position: Left wing
- Shot: Left
- Played for: Ottawa Senators; Boston Bruins; Toronto St. Pats
- Playing career: 1922–1932

Stanton James Jackson (August 27, 1898 – November 28, 1955) was a Canadian ice hockey left winger who played parts of five seasons in the National Hockey League for the Toronto St. Pats, Boston Bruins and Ottawa Senators between 1922 and 1926. He also played several years in different minor leagues, retiring in 1932.

== Playing career ==
Jackson played ice hockey for Amherst Academy in 1916–17 before joining the military in 1917. During his military service, he played for Toronto RFC in the Toronto National Defence League. Upon his return from service Jackson played from 1919 until 1923 in the Maritime Hockey League for the Amherst Ramblers, Halifax Wolverines and Stellarton Professionals. He got a one-game tryout with the Toronto St. Patricks in the 1921–22 season, playing January 4, 1922 against the Ottawa Senators, but returned to Nova Scotia. Jackson signed with the St. Patricks in 1923. After one season with Toronto, Jackson was traded to the Boston Bruins where he played two seasons. During the 1926–27 season, Jackson was traded to the Ottawa Senators, where he played eight games before he was traded to London of the Can-Pro League. Jackson played for various minor league pro teams before finishing his playing career with the Buffalo Bisons in 1931–32. He briefly returned to professional hockey to coach the Miami Beach Pirates in the Tropical Hockey League, before the league folded in 1939.

== Career statistics ==
=== Regular season and playoffs ===
			Regular season					Playoffs
Season	Team	League	GP	G	A	Pts	PIM	GP	G	A	Pts	PIM
1916–17	Amherst Academy	HS-NS	—	—	—	—	—	—	—	—	—	—
1917–18	Toronto RFC	TNDHL	—	—	—	—	—	—	—	—	—	—
1919–20	Amherst Ramblers	NSSHL	2	1	0	1	5	—	—	—	—	—
1919–20	Halifax Imperoyals	HCHL	—	—	—	—	—	—	—	—	—	—
1920–21	Amherst Ramblers	MIL	10	13	0	13	10	2	1	0	1	2
1921–22	Amherst Ramblers	MIL	8	9	0	9	10	—	—	—	—	—
1921–22	Toronto St. Pats	NHL	1	0	0	0	0	—	—	—	—	—
1921–22	Halifax Independents	Exib	1	0	0	0	0	—	—	—	—	—
1921–22	Stellarton Professionals	MIL	—	—	—	—	—	6	4	0	4	2
1922–23	Amherst Ramblers	MIL	12	14	0	14	24	—	—	—	—	—
1923–24	Toronto St. Pats	NHL	22	1	1	2	6	—	—	—	—	—
1924–25	Toronto St. Pats	NHL	3	0	0	0	7	—	—	—	—	—
1924–25	Boston Bruins	NHL	24	5	2	7	30	—	—	—	—	—
1925–26	Boston Bruins	NHL	28	3	3	6	30	—	—	—	—	—
1926–27	New Haven Eagles	Can-Am	7	5	0	5	8	—	—	—	—	—
1926–27	Ottawa Senators	NHL	8	0	0	0	2	—	—	—	—	—
1926–27	London Panthers	Can-Pro	16	3	0	3	36	4	2	1	3	8
1927–28	London Panthers	Can-Pro	42	16	9	25	91	—	—	—	—	—
1928–29	London Panthers	Can-Pro	14	4	1	5	30	—	—	—	—	—
1928–29	Philadelphia Arrows	Can-Am	18	2	1	3	24	—	—	—	—	—
1929–30	Philadelphia Arrows	Can-Am	38	8	13	21	60	2	0	1	1	4
1930–31	Buffalo Bisons	IHL	41	6	1	7	32	6	1	0	1	6
1931–32	Buffalo Bisons	IHL	38	1	3	4	8	—	—	—	—	—
1938–39	Miami Beach Pirates	THL	1	0	0	0	0	—	—	—	—	—
NHL totals			86	9	6	15	75	—	—	—	—	—

=== Head coaching record ===
Team	Year	Regular season						Post season
Team	Year	G	W	L	T	Pts	Division Rank	Result
Miami Beach Pirates	1938–39	14	5	9	0	10	3rd	
Total		14	5	9	0	10		
