= USL Palm Beach =

- Full name: USL Palm Beach
- Founded: December 14, 2023; 2 years ago
- Ground: TBD
- Owner(s): Nacho Figueras; Delfina Blaquier
- League: USL Championship; USL Super League

USL Palm Beach is an upcoming American professional soccer team based in Palm Beach County, Florida. Founded in 2023, the team plans to make its debut in the USL Championship for the men's squad and the USL Super League for the women's.

== History ==
On December 14, 2023, the USL awarded Palm Beach Sports Holdings LLC an expansion team to Palm Beach County, Florida for its men's and women's leagues. The ownership group consists of Nacho Figueras and Delfina Blaquier. The club will play on the grounds of a stadium to be determined.

On January 27, 2025, Palm Beach Sports Holdings LLC trademarked the names "Palm Beach Gold FC" and "Palm Beach FC", along with a design of an emblem with the respective names.
