= United States Grand Prix (disambiguation) =

Several races are held under the name United States Grand Prix:

- United States Grand Prix, a motor race first held in the United States in 1908, run to Formula One regulations since 1959
- United States motorcycle Grand Prix, Grand Prix motorcycle races held in the United States between 1961 and 2013

== See also ==
- United States Grand Prix West
- Grand Prix Americas (disambiguation)
- American Grand Prix (disambiguation)
- Motorcycle Grand Prix of the Americas
- Category:Formula One races in the United States, for other Formula One races held in the United States
