= Gulfstream Park Turf Sprint Stakes =

Horse race in Florida, United States

- Class: Listed
- Location: Gulfstream Park; Hallandale Beach, Florida, United States
- Inaugurated: 2011
- Race type: Thoroughbred – Flat racing – Turf
- Website: Gulfstream Park

Race information
- Distance: 5 furlongs
- Surface: Turf
- Track: Left-handed
- Qualification: Four-year-olds and older
- Weight: 124 lbs with allowances
- Purse: US$165,000 (2025)

The Gulfstream Park Turf Sprint Stakes is a Listed American Thoroughbred horse race for horses four-years-old and older at the distance of five furlongs on the turf held annually in February at Gulfstream Park, Hallandale Beach, Florida. The event currently carries a purse of $165,000.

== History ==
The event was inaugurated 23 January 2011 and was won by the eight-year-old former claimer Stradivinsky who was the 11/10 favorite in a 5 horse field in a time of 56.69.

In 2020 the event was renamed to the World of Trouble Turf Sprint Stakes after the sprinter World of Trouble who won the race the previous year.

The event was upgraded to Grade III in 2021 and the name of the race was reverted to the Gulfstream Park Turf Sprint Stakes.

In 2024 the event was downgraded by the Thoroughbred Owners and Breeders Association to Listed status

== Records ==
Speed record:

- 5 furlongs: 54.17 – Varsity (2013)

Margins:

- 3 1/4 lengths – Yes I Am Free (2022)

Most wins

- 2 – Power Alert (AUS) (2016, 2017)
- 2 – Yes I Am Free (2022, 2023)
- 2 – Coppola (2024, 2025)

Most wins by a jockey

- 3 – Julien R. Leparoux (2011, 2016, 2017)

Most wins by a trainer

- 3 – Brian A. Lynch (2016, 2017, 2026)

Most wins by an owner

- 2 – AJ Suited Racing Stable & Brian A. Lynch (2016, 2017)
- 2 – Michael Dubb & Bethlehem Stables (2011, 2019)
- 2 – Golden Kernel Racing Stable (2022, 2023)
- 2 - Hammer Time Stable & Sport of Kings Racing Partners (2024, 2025)

== Winners ==
Year	Winner	Age	Jockey	Trainer	Owner	Distance	Time	Purse	Grade	Ref
Gulfstream Park Turf Sprint Stakes
2026	Litigation	4	Mario Gutierrez	Brian A. Lynch	Stone Farm	5 furlongs	55.03	$155,000	Listed	
2025	Coppola	6	Tyler Gaffalione	Dale L. Romans	Hammer Time Stable & S.O.K. Racing	5 furlongs	54.43	$157,000	Listed	
2024	Coppola	5	Edgard Zayas	Dale L. Romans	Hammer Time Stable & S.O.K. Racing	5 furlongs	54.39	$125,000	Listed	
2023	Yes I Am Free	7	Miguel Vasquez	Laura Cazares	Golden Kernel Racing Stable	5 furlongs	55.71	$125,000	III	
2022	Yes I Am Free	6	Emisael Jaramillo	Laura Cazares	Golden Kernel Racing Stable	abt. 5 furlongs	56.07	$100,000	III	
2021	Leinster	6	Luis Saez	George Arnold II	Amy E. Dunne, Brenda Miley, Westrock Stables & Jean Wilkinson	5 furlongs	55.29	$100,000	III	
World of Trouble Turf Sprint Stakes
2020	Texas Wedge	5	Flavien Prat	Brad H. Cox	Altamira Racing Stable, Rafter JR Ranch, STD Racing Stable & A. Miller	5 furlongs	55.84	$150,000	Listed	
Gulfstream Park Turf Sprint Stakes
2019	World of Trouble	4	Irad Ortiz Jr.	Todd A. Pletcher	Michael Dubb, Madaket Stables & Bethlehem Stables	5 furlongs	56.44	$150,000		
2018	Rainbow Heir	8	Irad Ortiz Jr.	Jason Servis	New Farm	5 furlongs	55.47	$125,000	Listed	
2017	Power Alert (AUS)	7	Julien R. Leparoux	Brian A. Lynch	AJ Suited Racing Stable & Brian A. Lynch	5 furlongs	54.90	$125,000	Listed	
2016	Power Alert (AUS)	6	Julien R. Leparoux	Brian A. Lynch	AJ Suited Racing Stable & Brian A. Lynch	5 furlongs	57.74	$75,000	Listed	
2015	Amelia's Wild Ride	4	Jose Lezcano	Ramon Preciado	Silver Trail Stables	5 furlongs	55.06	$75,000		
2014	Wicked Tune	7	Elvis Trujillo	Jane Cibelli	Patricia A. Generazio	5 furlongs	56.98	$90,000		
2013	Varsity	6	Joe Bravo	Christophe Clement	Bertram and Diana Firestone	5 furlongs	54.17	$75,000		
2012	Private Jet (ARG)	7	John R. Velazquez	Kiaran P. McLaughlin	Joseph Brocklebank	5 furlongs	55.48	$58,800		
2011	Stradivinsky	8	Julien R. Leparoux	Richard E. Dutrow Jr.	Michael Dubb, Jack Mandato & Bethlehem Stables	5 furlongs	56.69	$58,800		

== See also ==
List of American and Canadian Graded races
