= Suncoast Stadium =

Multi-purpose stadium in Riviera Beach, Florida

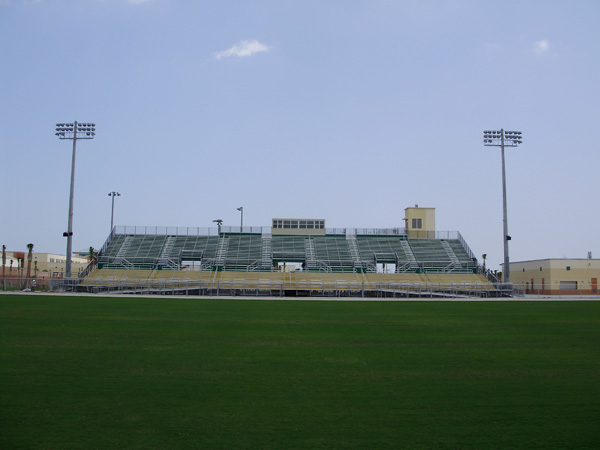
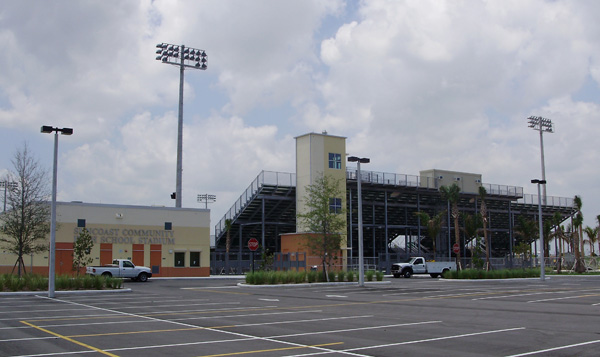
- Interactive map of Suncoast Stadium
- Location: Jake Lane & W 13th Street, Riviera Beach, Florida 33404
- Coordinates: 26°46′39.56″N 80°5′5.15″W
- Owner: School District of Palm Beach County
- Operator: Suncoast Community High School
- Capacity: 3,889
- Surface: Natural Grass

Construction
- Groundbreaking: November 25, 2008
- Opened: August 16, 2010
- Cost: $68,000,000
- Architects: MPA Architects, Inc (West Palm Beach, FL)

Tenant
- Suncoast Chargers (2010-Present) FHSAA

Suncoast Stadium is the multi-purpose home venue for the Suncoast Chargers High School athletics program (FHSAA).

This multi-purpose facility is equipped with a 3-room press box (220 sq ft), natural grass turf, two food concession and public restroom buildings (home and visitor), and energy efficient lighting for night games or events. The combination steel and aluminum bleacher design has a seating capacity of 3,889 (2,879 home; 1,010 visitors).

The facility is completely accessible to persons with disabilities that feature ADA specification ramps to the venue and lower concourse level of each grandstand, as well as all public amenities (restrooms and food concessions). Both grandstands have a total of 50 wheelchair viewing locations (34 in the home seating section, 16 in the visitors seating section). The fan parking area can hold up to 343 light passenger vehicles and includes 16 handicap spaces. There is an elevator that offers wheelchair access to the top concourse level of the home grandstand and press box area.

Suncoast Stadium is located on the campus of Suncoast Community High School in the City of Riviera Beach, Florida. It replaces the former home of both the Chargers and the Mariners, Old Al Sutton Stadium, which was located 1.5 miles away to the east. The $68 million price tag included the cost for additional construction of an on-site campus auditorium (capacity 808), and gymnasium with retractable bleachers (capacity 1,628).

A famous athletic alum of Suncoast is Anthony Carter (American football), a three-time All-American at the University of Michigan and a veteran of thirteen professional seasons as a wide receiver in both the United States Football League and the National Football League. Carter was elected to the College Football Hall Of Fame in 2001.
