= American Grand Prix =

American Grand Prix may refer to two automobile races.

- United States Grand Prix, originally known as the American Grand Prize, a current Formula One race
- Grand Prix of America, a failed Formula One race proposal

== See also ==
- Motorcycle Grand Prix of the Americas
- United States Grand Prix (disambiguation)
- Grand Prix Americas (disambiguation)
