= Tropical Hockey League =

Ice Hockey league in Florida, US

- Sport: Ice hockey
- Founded: 1938
- Folded: 1939 (resurrected in 1940)
- Country: United States
- Last champion: Coral Gables Seminoles
- Most titles: Coral Gables Seminoles (1)

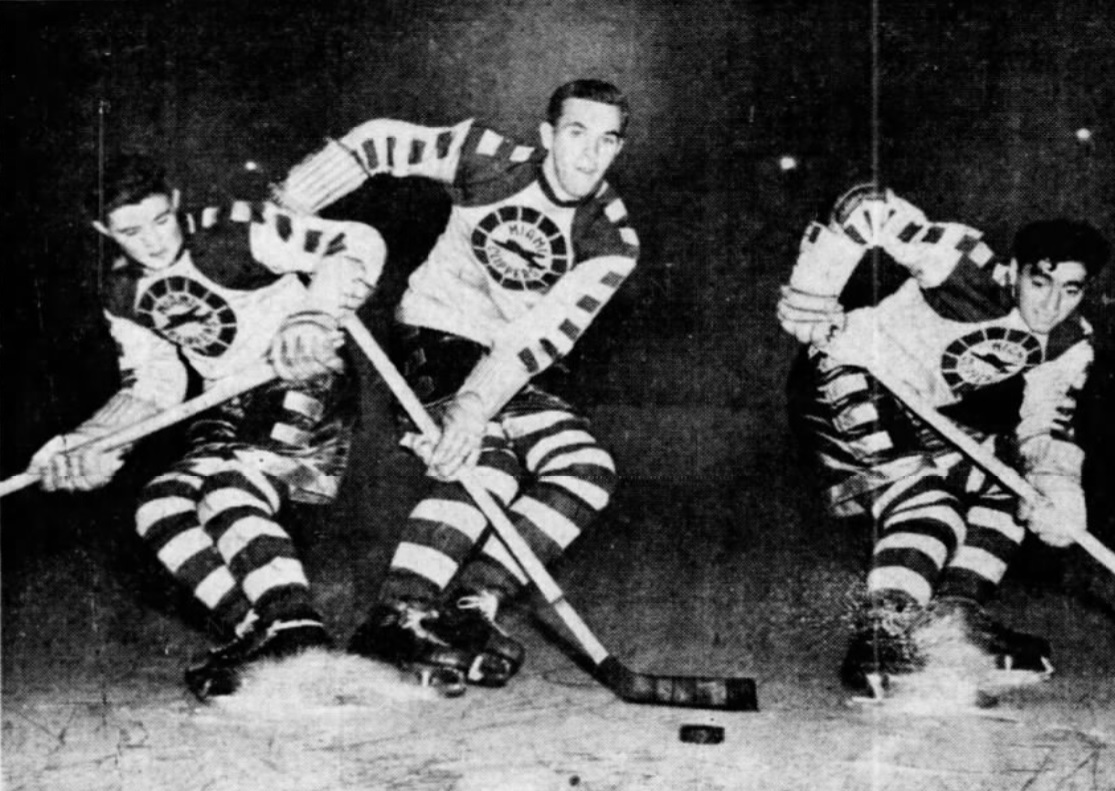
Players of the Miami Clippers in 1938

The Tropical Hockey League (THL) was a short-lived ice hockey minor league in Miami, Florida. The initial league had four teams, all based in Miami, and lasted for only one season, 1938–39, before folding; it was briefly resurrected in 1940 before folding for good the following year. Nicknamed the Grapefruit League, it was notable as the first attempt to establish professional hockey in Florida—or the Southern United States in general—though it ultimately had minimal impact on popularizing the sport in the region.

== History ==
The Tropical Hockey League was established as an attempt to introduce ice hockey to the Southern United States. Its founders hoped to take advantage of the large population of "snowbirds" from Eastern Canada who wintered in south Florida. The league consisted of four teams, all of which played at the Miami Coliseum (renamed the Metropolitan Ice Palace) in Coral Gables. The Miami Clippers, Miami Beach Pirates, the Coral Gables Seminoles, and the Havana Tropicals. The inclusion of a Havana team (albeit one playing in the United States) was designed to attract in particular Cuban Americans to the sport. Before the inaugural season had even started, the league was considering expanding to Jacksonville and even the Bahamas.

Because it was not affiliated with the Amateur Hockey Association of the United States, founded the year before as a new governing body for ice hockey in the United States, the THL struggled to recruit top-tier talent. W. G. Hardy, then-president of the Canadian Amateur Hockey Association (and future president of the IIHF), warned Canadians against signing contracts with the Tropical Hockey League. Nevertheless, the THL's players, with just three exceptions, were all Canadians recruited from camps in Port Colborne, Ontario and Winnipeg, Manitoba. The Seminoles, having recruited much of their roster from Western Canada, developed an on-ice rivalry with the other three teams, which were predominantly eastern Canadian.

One notable figure was Magnus "Mike" Goodman, a former member of the Winnipeg Falcons who won the gold medal in hockey for Canada in the 1920 Summer Olympics; he served the Seminoles as player-coach. Other teams sought out similar talent for their manager positions; the Pirates signed Stan Jackson, a former winger for the Boston Bruins and Toronto St. Pats, while the Clippers hired Harold "Bullet Joe" Simpson, former manager of the National Hockey League's New York Americans and future Hockey Hall of Famer. The Clippers also signed defensemen Bob Dill, who would go on to play with the New York Rangers, and Frank Mailley, who played one game for the Montreal Canadiens.

The league's inaugural game, billed as "the first hockey game ever staged in the South", was played between the Clippers and Pirates on December 10, 1938. It was preceded by demonstrations of the sport by the players and featured a mambo concert after the second period. The game ended with a fight following a 3–2 victory by the Clippers. The Tropical Hockey League made it through a 15-game season in 1938–39, with the Seminoles being crowned regular season champions.

Goodman's Seminoles went on to play an "All-Star Game" against the best players from the other three teams, which the Seminoles lost 6-5. This, however, would be the last game played by the original THL. The league had failed to attract much interest from the community, in part due to its late start times, weak competition, and tendency for games to devolve into fighting. With its promoters losing money, the first hockey experiment in the southern United States folded at the end of the season.

The THL was briefly resurrected as a three-team amateur league in 1940. This iteration of the league was bankrolled by Burdines, Pan American, and Florida Power & Light, and featured the Clippers, Pirates, and Indians (the former Seminoles); Goodman and Simpson returned as coaches. Unlike the 1938-39 league, most of these rosters were made up of recruits from the Miami area, including college students and Army, Navy, and Air Corps servicemen. The 1941 Clippers featured a former NHLer in Bill Regan, as well as the son of Stanley Cup-winning goaltender Hap Holmes. Though records are unclear, it appears that this league folded around September 1941, after the city of Coral Gables "took away" the Coliseum from the THL—thus depriving the league of a home rink.

== Final standings ==
Tropical Hockey League, 1938-39 season
	GP	W	L	T	GF	GA	Pts
Coral Gables Seminoles	14	12	2	0	85	53	24
Miami Clippers	13	7	6	0	53	58	14
Miami Beach Pirates	14	5	9	0	57	69	10
Havana Tropicals	15	4	11	0	69	84	8

== Legacy ==
The Tropical Hockey League experiment did little to popularize hockey in the South. After 1941, there would be no further attempt to establish professional hockey in the region until 1956, when the Eastern Hockey League placed the Charlotte Clippers, later the Charlotte Checkers, in Charlotte, North Carolina. Florida did not get another hockey team until the Jacksonville Rockets joined the EHL in 1964. From 1992 to 1995 there was another minor hockey league based in Florida, the Sunshine Hockey League. Major league hockey did not expand into the South until the 1970s, with the NHL's Atlanta Flames and the World Hockey Association's Houston Aeros (both in 1972).

The WHA had also attempted to place another team in Miami, the Screaming Eagles, but the plan fell apart due to the unsuitability of existing arenas (including the Coliseum). The NHL finally expanded to Florida in the 1992–93 season, awarding an expansion franchise to the Tampa Bay Lightning; hockey returned to Miami the following season with the establishment of the Florida Panthers.

The NHL would not see a Florida-born player until Val James, who made his brief debut with the 1981–82 Buffalo Sabres; the first Florida-raised player in the NHL would be Brian Ferlin, who played for junior hockey in Jacksonville before debuting with the 2014–15 Bruins.
