= Miami Coliseum =

Former arena in Coral Gables, Florida

- Interactive map of Miami Coliseum
- Former names: Metropolitan Ice Palace (1938–41)
- Address: 1500 Douglas Rd; Coral Gables, Florida
- Coordinates: 25.757200°N 80.255530°W
- Capacity: 4,400

Construction
- Built: 1927
- Opened: November 11, 1927
- Demolished: July 20, 1993
- Cost: US$900,000 ($16.7 million in 2025 dollars)
- Architect: A. Ten Eyck Brown

Tenant
- Tropical Hockey League (1938–41)

The Miami Coliseum, also known as the Coral Gables Coliseum, was a multi-purpose arena located in Coral Gables, Florida. It was developed by George E. Merrick, the founder of Coral Gables and of the University of Miami, who sought to create a cultural center for the Miami area. Like the rest of the planned community, the Coliseum was built in the Mediterranean Revival style.

Heavily in debt after the collapse of Florida's land boom, Merrick sold the Coliseum to the City of Coral Gables in 1927, before it was completed.

In 1938, the Coliseum was rebuilt into an ice rink and rechristened the Metropolitan Ice Palace. Inspired by the films of Sonja Henie, the arena's managers sought to host ice skating shows for Miami residents, as well as ice hockey games. The Ice Palace was home to all four teams of the Tropical Hockey League (THL), the first attempt at professional hockey in Florida (and in the South). Though the THL was, at least initially, a moderate success, it had a turbulent lifespan and continually lost money for its promoters. Ultimately, the league folded around September 1941. Shortly thereafter, the city filed a $42,500 suit and sought foreclosure against the Ice Palace's operators.

With the onset of World War II, the Coliseum was leased to Embry–Riddle University to train military pilots. However, it was converted back into an ice rink in 1949. It would be the only indoor arena in Miami-Dade County until the 1950s when the Miami Beach Auditorium was built. Afterwards, it was turned into a bowling alley, and later a health club, before becoming vacant in 1987. Despite a push by preservationists to maintain the historic structure, it was demolished in 1993.
