= Miami Open =

Miami Open most commonly refers to:

- Miami Open (tennis), an upper level tennis event held at Hard Rock Stadium, Miami Gardens, Florida

Miami Open may also refer to:

- WCT Miami Open, a defunct World Championship Tennis tournament
- Miami Open (golf), a defunct PGA Tour golf tournament
- Sunshine Women's Open, a defunct LPGA Tour golf tournament also known as the Miami Open
