= U.S. 500 =

U.S. 500 may refer to:

- US 500, a trademarked alias for the S&P 500, a major US stock market index of large-cap companies
- US 500, a perpetual futures contract from Kalshi for a US large-cap stock index

== Michigan International Speedway races ==
- 1996 U.S. 500, a CART series race held May 26, 1996, the same day as the 1996 Indianapolis 500
- Michigan 500, a CART series race that was held under the title U.S. 500 from 1997 to 1999
