= Grand Prix Americas =

Several races are called the Grand Prix Americas:

- For the CART event, see Grand Prix of Miami (open wheel racing)
- For the ALMS event, see Grand Prix of Miami (sports car racing)

== See also ==
- United States Grand Prix (disambiguation)
- American Grand Prix (disambiguation)
