= PGA National Champion Course =

Golf course in Florida, United States

Club information
- Location: Palm Beach Gardens, Florida, United States
- Established: 1981
- Type: Private
- Owner: PGA of America
- Operator: PGA of America
- Tota holes: 18
- Tournaments: Honda Classic (2007–present); Senior PGA Championship (1982–2000); 1987 PGA Championship; 1983 Ryder Cup
- Website: pgaresort.com
- Designed by: George & Tom Fazio redesign: Jack Nicklaus
- Par: 72
- Length: 7,048
- Course rating: 75.2

The PGA National Champion Course is an 18-hole golf course located at the PGA National Golf Club in Palm Beach Gardens, Florida, United States.

The PGA National Champion Course was opened on November 17, 1981. It was the site of the 1983 Ryder Cup, the 1987 PGA Championship (won by Larry Nelson), and the Senior PGA Championship for 19 years, from 1982 to 2000. The course underwent a $4 million renovation in December 2002, and in 2007 became the home of The Honda Classic.

The course rating is 75.3 and it has a slope rating of 147 on Bermuda grass.
