= 1950 Chicago White Sox season =

1950 Chicago White Sox
- League: American League
- Ballpark: Comiskey Park
- City: Chicago
- Owners: Grace Comiskey
- General managers: Frank Lane
- Managers: Jack Onslow, Red Corriden
- Television: WGN-TV (Jack Brickhouse, Harry Creighton)
- Radio: WJJD/WBKI (Bob Elson)

The 1950 Chicago White Sox season was the team's 50th season in the major leagues, and its 51st season overall. They finished with a record of 60–94, good enough for sixth place in the American League, 38 games behind the first place New York Yankees.

== Offseason ==
- October 1949: Chico Carrasquel was purchased by the White Sox from the Brooklyn Dodgers.
- February 28, 1950: Catfish Metkovich was purchased from the White Sox by the Oakland Oaks.
- Prior to 1950 season (exact date unknown)
  - Bill Wilson was acquired by the White Sox from the Sacramento Solons as part of a minor league working agreement.
  - Vito Valentinetti was signed as an amateur free agent by the White Sox.

== Regular season ==
=== Season standings ===
American League
Team	W	L	Pct.	GB	Home	Road
New York Yankees	98	56	.636	—	53‍–‍24	45‍–‍32
Detroit Tigers	95	59	.617	3	50‍–‍30	45‍–‍29
Boston Red Sox	94	60	.610	4	55‍–‍22	39‍–‍38
Cleveland Indians	92	62	.597	6	49‍–‍28	43‍–‍34
Washington Senators	67	87	.435	31	35‍–‍42	32‍–‍45
Chicago White Sox	60	94	.390	38	35‍–‍42	25‍–‍52
St. Louis Browns	58	96	.377	40	27‍–‍47	31‍–‍49
Philadelphia Athletics	52	102	.338	46	29‍–‍48	23‍–‍54

=== Record vs. opponents ===
1950 American League record Sources:
Team	BOS	CWS	CLE	DET	NYY	PHA	SLB	WSH
Boston	—	15–7	10–12	10–12	9–13	19–3	19–3	12–10
Chicago	7–15	—	8–14	6–16–2	8–14	11–11	12–10	8–14
Cleveland	12–10	14–8	—	13–9–1	8–14	17–5	13–9	15–7
Detroit	12–10	16–6–2	9–13–1	—	11–11	17–5	17–5	13–9
New York	13–9	14–8	14–8	11–11	—	15–7	17–5	14–8–1
Philadelphia	3–19	11–11	5–17	5–17	7–15	—	8–14	13–9
St. Louis	3–19	10–12	9–13	5–17	5–17	14–8	—	12–10
Washington	10–12	14–8	7–15	9–13	8–14–1	9–13	10–12	—

=== Opening Day lineup ===
- Herb Adams, RF
- Dave Philley, CF
- Cass Michaels, 2B
- Gus Zernial, LF
- Hank Majeski, 3B
- Chuck Kress, 1B
- Chico Carrasquel, SS
- Phil Masi, C
- Bill Wight, P

=== Notable transactions ===
- July 1, 1950: Jack Bruner was purchased from the White Sox by the St. Louis Browns.

=== Roster ===
1950 Chicago White Sox
Roster
Pitchers: 59 Luis Aloma; 15,49 Jack Bruner; 56 Bob Cain; 35 Bill Connelly; 28 Charlie Cuellar; 18 Randy Gumpert; 12,18 Mickey Haefner; 34,58 Ken Holcombe; 48 Howie Judson; 35 Gus Keriazakos; 28 Lou Kretlow; 46 Bob Kuzava; 57 John Perkovich; 19 Billy Pierce; 49 Marv Rotblatt; 7 Ray Scarborough; 29 Bill Wight	Catchers: 45 Joe Erautt; 28 Eddie Malone; 38 Phil Masi; 24 Gus Niarhos; 15 Bill Salkeld; Infielders: 4 Luke Appling; 8 Floyd Baker; 17 Chico Carrasquel; 26 Nellie Fox; 16,25 Gordon Goldsberry; 15 Joe Kirrene; 2 Al Kozar; 25 Chuck Kress; 5 Hank Majeski; 7 Cass Michaels; 46 Eddie Robinson	Outfielders: 24 Herb Adams; 47 Jim Busby; 2 Mike McCormick; 14 Ed McGhee; 2 Johnny Ostrowski; 9 Dave Philley; 3 Marv Rickert; 36,39 Jerry Scala; 34 Bill Wilson; 6 Gus Zernial	Manager: 33 Red Corriden; 23 Jack Onslow; Coaches: 44 Ray Berres; 33 Red Corriden; 22 Buster Mills

== Player stats ==
=== Batting ===
Note: G = Games played; AB = At bats; R = Runs scored; H = Hits; 2B = Doubles; 3B = Triples; HR = Home runs; RBI = Runs batted in; BB = Base on balls; SO = Strikeouts; AVG = Batting average; SB = Stolen bases

Player	G	AB	R	H	2B	3B	HR	RBI	BB	SO	AVG	SB
Herb Adams, CF	34	118	12	24	2	3	0	2	12	7	.203	3
Luke Appling, SS, 1B	50	128	11	30	3	4	0	13	12	8	.234	2
Floyd Baker, 3B	83	186	26	59	7	0	0	11	32	10	.317	1
Jim Busby, CF	18	48	5	10	0	0	0	4	1	5	.208	0
Chico Carrasquel, SS	141	524	72	148	21	5	4	46	66	46	.282	0
Joe Erautt, C	16	18	0	4	0	0	0	1	1	3	.222	0
Nellie Fox, 2B	130	457	45	113	12	7	0	30	35	17	.247	4
Gordon Goldsberry, 1B	82	127	19	34	8	2	2	25	26	18	.268	0
Joe Kirrene, 3B	1	4	0	1	0	0	0	0	0	1	.250	0
Al Kozar, 2B	10	10	4	3	0	0	1	2	0	3	.300	0
Chuck Kress, 1B	3	8	0	0	0	0	0	0	0	2	.000	0
Hank Majeski, 3B	122	414	47	128	18	2	6	46	42	34	.309	1
Eddie Malone, C	31	71	2	16	2	0	0	10	10	8	.225	0
Phil Masi, C	122	377	38	105	17	2	7	55	49	36	.279	2
Mike McCormick, CF	55	138	16	32	4	3	0	10	16	6	.232	0
Ed McGhee, RF	3	6	0	1	0	1	0	0	0	1	.167	0
Cass Michaels, 2B	36	138	21	43	6	3	4	19	13	8	.312	0
Gus Niarhos, C	41	105	17	34	4	0	0	16	14	6	.324	0
Johnny Ostrowski, OF	22	49	10	12	2	1	2	2	9	9	.245	0
Dave Philley, RF, CF	156	619	69	150	21	5	14	80	52	57	.242	6
Marv Rickert, RF, LF	84	278	38	66	9	2	4	27	21	42	.237	0
Eddie Robinson, 1B	119	424	62	133	11	2	20	73	60	28	.314	0
Bill Salkeld, C	1	3	0	0	0	0	0	0	1	0	.000	0
Jerry Scala, CF	40	67	8	13	2	1	0	6	10	10	.194	0
Bill Wilson, CF	3	6	0	0	0	0	0	0	2	2	.000	0
Gus Zernial, LF	143	543	75	152	16	4	29	93	38	110	.280	0

Player	G	AB	R	H	2B	3B	HR	RBI	BB	SO	AVG	SB
Luis Aloma, P	42	15	0	1	0	0	0	1	0	6	.067	0
Bob Cain, P	35	61	7	12	2	0	0	2	3	15	.197	0
Randy Gumpert, P	41	42	2	3	0	0	0	4	2	10	.071	0
Mickey Haefner, P	24	20	0	4	0	0	0	1	3	3	.200	0
Ken Holcombe, P	24	32	2	5	1	0	0	0	0	8	.156	0
Howie Judson, P	46	20	1	2	1	0	0	0	3	5	.100	0
Gus Keriazakos, P	1	1	0	1	0	0	0	0	0	0	1.000	0
Lou Kretlow, P	26	48	1	4	0	0	0	5	2	24	.083	0
Bob Kuzava, P	10	12	3	1	0	0	0	1	3	3	.083	0
John Perkovich, P	1	1	0	0	0	0	0	0	0	1	.000	0
Billy Pierce, P	40	77	10	20	3	0	0	6	6	13	.260	0
Marv Rotblatt, P	2	2	0	0	0	0	0	0	0	1	.000	0
Ray Scarborough, P	27	46	1	8	0	0	0	4	3	7	.174	1
Bill Wight, P	30	61	2	0	0	0	0	2	4	17	.000	0
Team totals	156	5260	625	1368	172	47	93	592	549	567	.260	19

=== Pitching ===
Note: W = Wins; L = Losses; ERA = Earned run average; G = Games pitched; GS = Games started; SV = Saves; IP = Innings pitched; H = Hits allowed; R = Runs allowed; ER = Earned runs allowed; HR = Home runs allowed; BB = Walks allowed; K = Strikeouts

Player	W	L	ERA	G	GS	SV	IP	H	R	ER	HR	BB	K
Luis Aloma	7	2	3.80	42	0	4	87.2	77	44	37	6	53	49
Jack Bruner	0	0	3.65	9	0	0	12.1	7	6	5	0	14	8
Bob Cain	9	12	3.93	34	23	2	171.2	153	80	75	12	109	77
Bill Connelly	0	0	11.57	2	0	0	2.1	5	3	3	1	1	0
Charlie Cuellar	0	0	33.75	2	0	0	1.1	6	6	5	0	3	1
Randy Gumpert	5	12	4.75	40	17	0	155.1	165	87	82	15	58	48
Mickey Haefner	1	6	5.73	24	9	0	70.2	83	49	45	11	45	17
Ken Holcombe	3	10	4.59	24	15	1	96.0	122	68	49	10	45	37
Howie Judson	2	3	3.94	46	3	0	112.0	105	53	49	10	63	34
Gus Keriazakos	0	1	19.29	1	1	0	2.1	7	5	5	0	5	1
Lou Kretlow	0	0	3.80	11	1	0	21.1	17	13	9	1	27	14
Bob Kuzava	1	3	5.68	10	7	0	44.1	43	28	28	5	27	21
John Perkovich	0	0	7.20	1	0	0	5.0	7	4	4	3	1	3
Billy Pierce	12	16	3.98	33	29	1	219.1	189	112	97	11	137	118
Marv Rotblatt	0	0	6.23	2	0	0	8.2	11	7	6	2	5	6
Ray Scarborough	10	13	5.30	27	23	1	149.1	160	95	88	10	62	70
Bill Wight	10	16	3.58	30	28	0	206.0	213	89	82	10	79	62
Team totals	60	94	4.41	156	156	9	1365.2	1370	749	669	107	734	566

== Farm system ==
Level	Team	League	Manager
AAA	Sacramento Solons	Pacific Coast League	Red Kress and Joe Marty
AA	Memphis Chicks	Southern Association	Al Todd
A	Colorado Springs Sky Sox	Western League	Buddy Hassett
B	Waterloo White Hawks	Illinois–Indiana–Iowa League	Otto Denning
C	Hot Springs Bathers	Cotton States League	John Antonelli
C	Superior Blues	Northern League	Bennie Huffman and Red Kress
D	Madisonville Miners	KITTY League	George Mitro and Skeeter Webb
D	Wisconsin Rapids White Sox	Wisconsin State League	John Kerr and Joe Holden
