= Lakeland Pilots (baseball) =

Minor league baseball team in Lakeland, Florida through 1955

- 1946–1955; (1919–1926, 1946–1955); Lakeland, Florida

Minor league affiliations
- Class: Class D (1919–1920); Class C (1921–1924); Class D (1925–1926); Class C (1946–1948); Class B (1949–1952); Class D (1953–1955)
- League: Florida State League (1919–1926); Florida International League (1946–1952); Florida State League (1953–1955)

Major league affiliations
- Team: None

Minor league titles
- League titles (2): 1924; 1954
- Conference titles (2): 1925; 1954
- Wild card berths (3): 1948; 1951; 1954

Team data
- Name: Lakeland Highlanders (1919–1926); Lakeland Pilots (1946–1955)
- Ballpark: Lakeland Ballpark (1919–1922); Henley Field (1923–1926, 1946–1955)

The Lakeland Pilots were a minor league baseball team based in Lakeland, Florida. Between 1946 and 1955, the "Pilots" played as charter members of the Florida International League before rejoining the Florida State League in 1953. The Lakeland Highlanders preceded the Pilots in minor league play as charter members of the 1919 Florida State League and were the first minor league team in the city, playing from 1919 to 1926. Lakeland won Florida State League championships in 1924 and 1954.

After beginning play at the Lakeland Ballpark through 1922, Lakeland teams hosted home minor league games at Henley Field beginning in 1923. The ballpark also served as the spring training site for the Cleveland Indians initially and then the Detroit Tigers beginning in 1934. Henley Field is on the U.S. National Register of Historic Places and was named for the Lakeland team owner.

The Lakeland "Pilots" nickname corresponded to military pilots who were trained in Lakeland in the era. In the World War II era, thousands of U.S. Army Air Force pilots were trained in Lakeland at Lodwick Field and the Lakeland Army Air Field, then known as Drane Field. The school trained over 8,000 pilots, some of whom later flew for the U.S. Army's Flying Tigers in China. Today, the Lakeland Flying Tigers minor league team plays home games on the former site of Lodwick Field at Publix Field at Joker Marchant Stadium.

== History ==
=== 1919 Florida State League: Charter membership ===
Minor league baseball began in Lakeland, Florida in 1919, when the Lakeland "Highlanders" were formed and the team became a charter member of the six-team Class D level Florida State League. Lakeland joined the Bartow Polkers, Bradenton Growers, Orlando Caps, Sanford Celeryfeds and Tampa Smokers teams as Florida State League charter members. Since forming in 1919, the Florida State League has continued minor league play with a few interruptions and today the league is classified as a Class A level league. The 1919 Florida State League played a shortened season, beginning the league schedule on July 1, 1919.

The newly formed Lakeland Highlanders hosted their home games at the Lakeland Ballpark. The team played at the ballpark through the 1921 season before moving to Henley Field. The Highlanders were owned by local businessman Claire Henley, who served as president of the Lakeland Baseball Club, which oversaw operations of the team.

In their first season of play in 1919, the Highlanders ended the season with a record of 40–37. Lakeland finished in third place in the overall standings, playing the season under managers Bill Pierre and Hugh Wicker. Lakeland finished 8.0 games behind the first place Sanford Celeryfeds in the final overall standings. The Florida State League played a spilt season schedule, and Sanford won the first half title and the Orlando Caps won the second half title. Lakeland did not qualify for the playoff as, the final between Samford and Orlando ended in a controversial tie. The series was tied 3 games each and a seventh game was not played due to a "dispute." Lakeland Player-manager Hugh Wicker batted .134 playing the outfield for Lakeland. Wicker compiled 47 hits in 350 at bats on the season in his only career player-manager role.

=== 1920 to 1926: Florida State League / Lakeland Highlanders ===
The 1920 Florida State League added two teams to become an eight-team league in its second season as the Lakeland Highlanders continued their membership in the expanded league. The Daytona Beach Islanders and St. Petersburg Saints teams joined the league as the two new expansion teams and the Class D level Florida State League began its season on May 1, 1920. Jim Manes became the Lakeland player-manager in 1920, having served in the same capacity for the Charleston Sea Gulls of the South Atlantic League in 1919.

The Highlanders ended the 1920 Florida State League season in fifth place in the final standings. Lakeland ended the season with a 50–65 record, playing the entire season under manager Jim Manes. In the overall Florida State League standings, Lakeland finished 38.0 games behind the first place Tampa Smokers. No playoffs were held as Tampa won both halves of the split season schedule, playing under future Lakeland manager Tommy Leach. Lakeland player-manager Jim Manes batted .285 with 7 doubles and 0 home runs playing in 62 games as a catcher for the Highlanders.

Pitcher Paul Schreiber played for Lakeland in 1920 at age 17, compiling a 12–13 record with a 2.01 ERA while throwing 206 innings for the Highlanders. Schreiber made his major league debut with the Brooklyn Dodgers at age 19 and pitched in 10 total major league games for Brooklyn in the 1922 and 1923 seasons, pitching at age 20 in 1923. After a span of 22 years, Schreiber next pitched in a major league game in 1945 when he pitched in 2 games for the New York Yankees at age 42.

The Lakeland Highlanders continued play as the 1921 Florida State League was upgraded to become a Class C level league, but reduced by two teams. The upgraded league continued play as a six-team league after the Bartow Polkers and Bradenton Growers teams did not return to the league. The Florida State League began the season on April 21, 1921.

The 1921 Lakeland Highlanders played the season under the direction of five different managers: Joe Wall, Harry Swacina, Perry Wilder, Bill Zimmerman and Milt Reed.

Joe Wall managed Lakeland in 1921 to begin the season at age 47. Wall came to Lakeland after managing the Newport News Shipbuilders of the Class B level Virginia League in 1920. In his major league career, Wall played briefly as a catcher in 15 games for the New York Giants and Brooklyn Superbas during the 1901 and 1902 major league seasons, batting .300 in his limited play.

In 1921, first baseman Harry Swacina also served as a player-manager for Lakeland at age 39. Swacina had played in 1920, with the Columbia Comers in the South Atlantic League where he batted .315 in 117 games. Swacina had played in the major leagues with the Pittsburgh Pirates (1907–1908) and Baltimore Terrapins (1914–1915), batting .256 with 1 home run in 322 career games. In 1914 with Baltimore, Swacina batted .287 with 90 RBIs and 15 stolen bases in 158 games for the Federal League Terrapins. After batting .307 for Lakeland in 39 games, Swacina played the remainder of the 1921 season with the Charleston Pals in the South Atlantic League.

Playing third base for Lakeland in 55 games at age 30, Milt Reed batted .321 for Lakeland in his player-manager role, also committing 22 errors. Reed played in major league baseball with the St. Louis Cardinals (1911), Philadelphia Phillies (1913–1914) and Brooklyn Tip-Tops (1915), hitting .227 in 68 total career games.

Born in Kengen, Germany, outfielder Bill Zimmerman managed Lakeland in his final professional baseball season at age 34. Zimmerman had played for the Jersey City Skeeters of the International League in 1920, batting .311 in 93 games. Zimmerman played in 22 games with the 1915 Brooklyn Tip-Tops alongside Milt Reed, batting .281 in his lone major league season.

In his final appearances in professional baseball, pitcher Percy Wilder compiled a 1–2 record with an 8.26 ERA while serving as the Lakeland player-manager in 1921 at age 39.

Despite their many leadership changes during the season, Lakeland finished in third place in the 1921 Florida State League, as the League played as a six-team league. The Highlanders ended the season with a record of 59–57, playing the season under the five different managers. In the final standings, third place Lakeland finished 14.0 games behind the first place Orlando Caps, as the league played a straight regular season with no playoffs or split season schedule.

Pitching for the Highlanders at age 40, right hander Bert Humphries compiled a 15–11 record for Lakeland in 1921, throwing 241 innings. In his major league career with the Philadelphia Phillies (1910–1911), Cincinnati Reds (1911–1912) and Chicago Cubs (1913–1915), Humphries had a career 50–43 record with a 2.79 ERA in 153 games with 45 complete games and 9 saves.

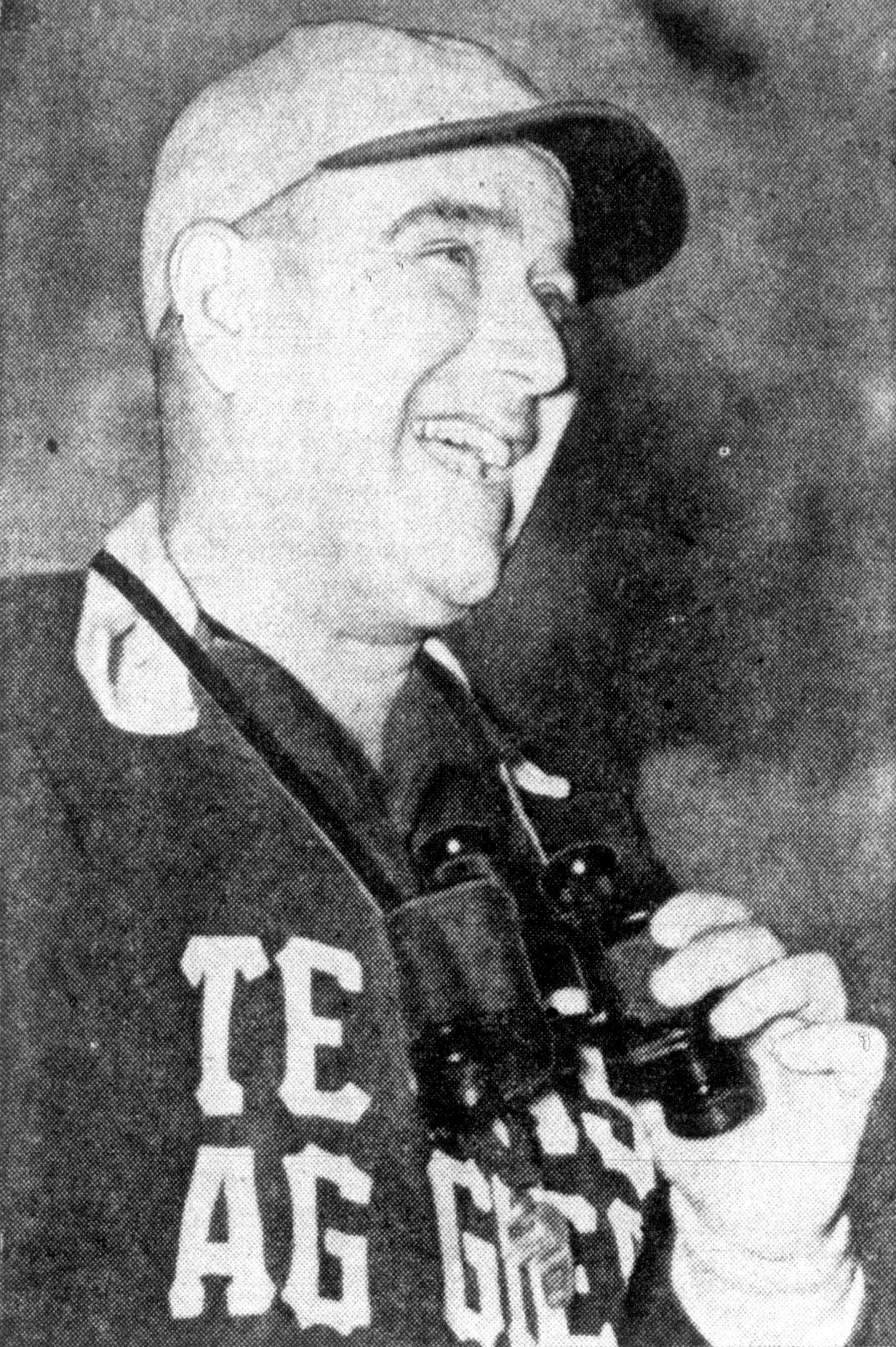
(1945) Homer Norton, Texas A&M Aggies. A member of the College Football Hall of Fame, Norton played for the Highlanders in 1921, batting .309 on the season, playing with Lakeland while simultaneously serving as a collegiate coach.

Outfielder Homer Norton played his second and final professional baseball season for Lakeland in 1921. Norton batted .309 in 117 games with 22 doubles and 5 triples and 1 home run in his season with the Highlanders. Norton became a college baseball and football coach and was serving as the football coach at Centenary College of Louisiana while playing for Lakeland, having begun coaching at the college in 1919. Norton later coached the 1939 Texas A&M Aggies football team to an undefeated 11–0 season, a victory in the 1940 Sugar Bowl and the team was named 1939 National Football Champions. In his collegiate coaching career, Norton compiled records of 143–75–18 (football), 49–43 (basketball) and 62–37–1 (baseball), coaching basketball at Centenary College of Louisiana from 1921 to 1926 and baseball at Texas A&M in 1943 and 1944. In 1971, Norton was inducted into the College Football Hall of Fame as a coach.

The Lakeland Highlanders continued play in the 1922 Florida State League season and placed fifth in the six-team Class C level league standings. The Highlanders had a final record of 52–61, playing the season under player-manager Doug Harbison. Lakeland finished 16.5 games behind the first place St. Petersburg Saints in the final overall standings. No playoffs were held as the St. Petersburg won both halves of the split season schedule. Playing first base in 91 games as the Lakeland player-manager, Harbison batted .256 with 1 home run on the season.

At age 45, former major league player Tommy Leach was hired as the Lakeland manager in 1923, having managed in the Florida State League for with the rival Tampa Bay Smokers for the previous three seasons. Leach played in the major leagues for 19 seasons and played on the 1909 World Series champion Pittsburgh Pirates team. Playing shortstop, third base and outfield in his major league career, Leach played in 2,156 games with .259 average, .340 OBP, 2,143 total hits, 812 RBIs and 362 stolen bases in his career. Leach played with the Louisville Colonels (1898–1899), Pittsburgh Pirates (1900–1912), Chicago Cubs (1912–1914), Cincinnati Reds (1915) and Pittsburgh Pirates (1918). In 15 career World Series games, Leach batted .315 with an .872 OPS.

In 1923, the Highlanders began play at the newly built Adair Athletic Park, later renamed to today's Henley Field. Claire Henley was serving as the president of the Lakeland Baseball Club when the ballpark was built on a parcel land purchased from Dr. Pike Adair and the park was initially named after Adair. The ballpark was later renamed in honor of Henley in 1942. The new ballpark also became the host of the Cleveland Indians' spring training games.

Lakeland improved in the 1923 season while playing under Tommy Leach, finishing the season in third place in the overall Florida State League standings. The Highlanders ended the season with an overall record of 60–55 and no league playoffs were held. Lakeland finished 17.5 games behind the first place Orlando Bulldogs, who won both halves of the split season schedule. Lakeland pitcher John Luther led the Florida State League with 127 strikeouts. First baseman Bud Ammons batted .369 for Lakeland in 105 games, adding 30 doubles, 11 triples and 5 home runs.

==== 1924: Florida State League championship ====
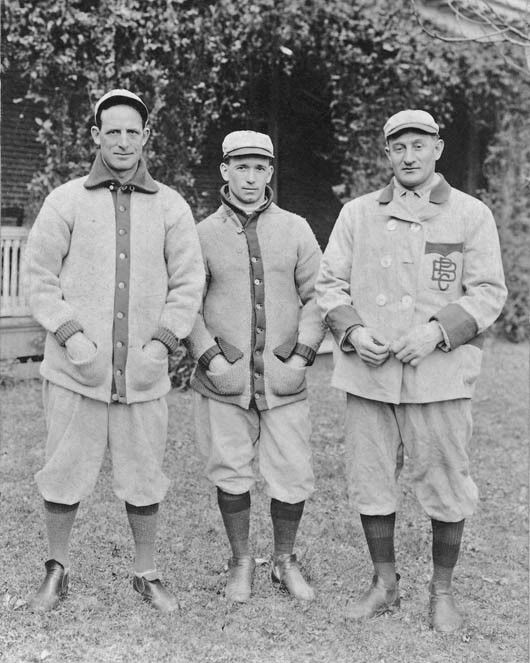
(1909) Tommy Leach, Pittsburgh Pirates (center), with long-time teammates Fred Clarke and Honus Wagner. Clarke and Wagner are members of the Baseball Hall of Fame. Leach managed the Lakeland Highlanders in 1923 and 1924, leading the 1924 Highlanders to the Florida State League championship. Leach played for 19 seasons in the major leagues and compiled 2,143 total hits.

The 1924 Lakeland Highlanders won the Florida State League championship in a shortened season. With Tommy Leach returning as the Lakeland manager for a third season, the Highlanders compiled a 77–42 record during the season in the six-team Class C level league. Lakeland won the league championship, finishing ahead of the Bradenton Growers, Daytona Beach Islanders/Clearwater Pelicans, Orlando Bulldogs, St. Petersburg Saints and Tampa Smokers teams.

During the Florida State League season, the Tampa Smokers franchise folded on August 1, 1924. The league briefly continued play with the five remaining teams before folding on August 8, 1924, with Lakeland in first place. When the league folded, Lakeland finished 6.5 games ahead of second place St. Petersburg, and 10.0 games ahead of third place Orlando in the final league standings. Lakeland pitcher John Luther compiled a 16–4 record to lead the Florida State League with a .800 winning percentage.

In 1924, playing his twelfth and final professional season at age 34, pitcher Ed Ery played his fifth consecutive season with Lakeland and compiled an 18–7 record with a 3.26 ERA in 29 games and 235 innings. Ery also played first base and outfield at times in his minor league career and batted .319 for Lakeland in 1924 in 119 at bats. First baseman Bud Ammons played again for the Highlanders and batted .362 for Lakeland in 102 games before continuing play and with the Winston-Salem Twins after the conclusion of the Florida State League's shortened season. Outfielder Bill Brazier batted .324 for the Highlanders, playing in 94 games at age 32.

Following the 1924 championship season with Lakeland, manager Tommy Leach did not return to the team in 1925. After a one-year hiatus, Leach returned to baseball in the Florida State League in 1926, managing the Tampa Smokers for two seasons and the St. Petersburg Saints for a final season, his last in professional baseball at age 50.

Despite folding before completing their schedule during the prior season, the Florida State League resumed play in 1925, forming as a four-team Class D level league. In defending their league championship, outfielder Bill Brazier remained with the Highlanders as player-manager in 1925 and led Lakeland to a runner-up finish and a split season league pennant. The Florida State League reduced to four-teams consisting of Lakeland, the Sanford Celeryfeds, St. Petersburg Saints and Tampa Smokers teams and reclassified to become a Class D level league.

On July 10, 1925, businessman John Wall Hendry announced that he had purchased the Sanford Celeryfeds franchise for the city of Fort Myers, Florida, with the intent to relocate the team. Immediately after the announcement, Charley Britt, owner of the Sanford Celeryfeds, voided the agreement after local investors contributed $5,000 to settle debt and the Celeryfeds remained in Sanford, Florida. One week later, Hendry put in an offer to purchase the Lakeland Highlanders for $7,000. The purchase discussions ended when Clare Henley, president of the Lakeland Highlanders franchise, made a successful counter proposal to settle the Lakeland debt and the team remained in Lakeland.

Continuing Florida State League play in 1925, the Lakeland Highlanders won a split season pennant during the league's regular season. The Highlanders ended the regular season with an overall record of 70–52, finishing in second place the overall standings of the four-team league. Lakeland finished 1.5 games behind the Tampa Smokers in the final Florida State League standings. Lakeland had won the Florida State League first half title in the split season schedule and Tampa won the second half pennant. However, third place St. Petersburg played Tampa in the final instead of Lakeland, losing 4 games to 3 to Tampa.

The Lakeland "Highlanders" franchise played its final season in the Florida State League in 1926. The 1926 league added four new teams and expanded to eight-teams while remaining classified as a Class D level league. The Bradenton Growers Fort Myers Palms, Orlando Colts and Sarasota Gulls were the four new members that joined the expanded Florida State League. The Highlanders ended the 1926 season with a record of 65–49, finishing the season in fourth place under the leadership of manager Roy Ellam. Lakeland ended the season 9.5 games behind the first place Sanford Celeryfeds in the final overall standings. No playoffs were held as Samford won both title in both halves of the split season schedule.

Playing first base at age 40, Lakeland player-manager Roy Ellam batted .260 in 112 games for the Highlanders. In total, Ellam played for 21 seasons in the minor leagues, appearing in 2,211 games career games. Playing shortstop, Ellam had two brief appearances in the major leagues. He appeared in 10 total games for the 1909 Cincinnati Reds and 26 games for the 1918 Pittsburgh Pirates, batting .143 with 1 home run and 13 errors in the field in his 36 major league games. After serving as player-manager the prior season, outfielder Bill Brazier remained with the Highlanders as a player, batting .314 in 112 games.

The Florida State continued play in 1927 without Lakeland as a member. The league also dropped the Bradenton Growers franchise and reduced to a six-team league that was classified as a Class C level league. The city of Lakeland was without a minor league team for the next twenty years.

=== 1946 to 1952: Lakeland Pilots / Florida International League ===
After a twenty-year span without a team, the Lakeland "Pilots" were formed in 1946 and resumed minor league play in a newly formed league. Lakeland became charter members of the six-team, Class C level Florida International League. The Lakeland Pilots resumed playing home games at Henley Field, which had become the spring training home of the Detroit Tigers. The Havana Cubans, Miami Beach Flamingos (Boston Braves affiliate), Miami Sun Sox, Tampa Smokers and West Palm Beach Indians teams joined with Lakeland in beginning the Florida International League schedule on April 17, 1946.

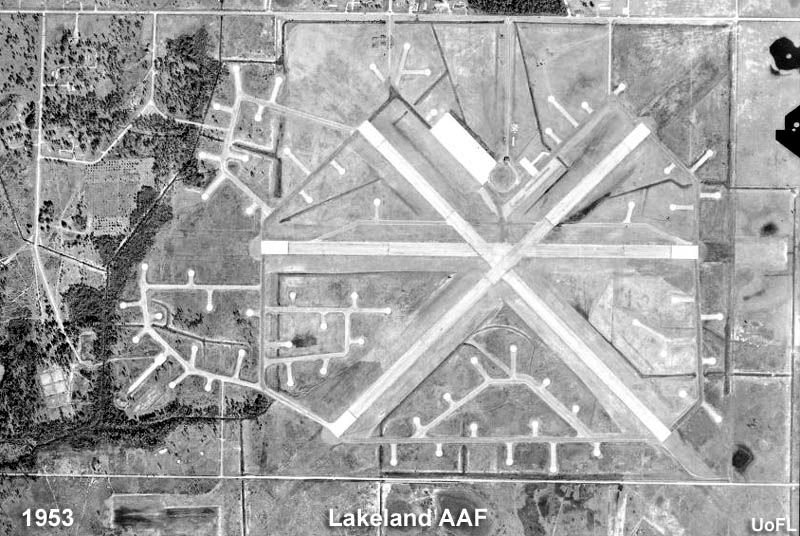
(1953) Lakeland Army Airfield, Lakeland, Florida.

The Lakeland "Pilots" nickname corresponds to Lakeland's storied military aeronautics history. During World War II, Lodwick Field and the Lakeland Army Air Field, also known as Drane Field, were in service. Thousands of U.S. Army Air Forces pilots, navigators, bombardiers and flight crew received advanced flight training in Lakeland, particularly in the Martin B-26 Marauder. Today, the city is home to the Florida Air Museum, honoring local aeronautics, and the public Lakeland Linder International Airport. In the era of the "Pilots" baseball team, Lakeland was home to the Lodwick School of Aeronautics, a World War II training ground for pilots, as over 8,000 pilots were trained at the school between 1940 and 1945, some of whom later flew with the U.S. Army's Flying Tigers in China during World War II. Today, the Lakeland Flying Tigers play their minor league home games at the former site of Lodwick Field, as the former air field site is the location of Publix Field at Joker Marchant Stadium.

On December 6, 1945, the Florida International League was approved for membership by the National Association, which oversaw minor league baseball in the era. The league was previously denied minor league membership by the National Association president W. G. Branham and an executive committee due to a general practice of not admitting any city in Cuba or Mexico into any minor leagues. This was problematic due to Havana, Cuba being a potential member of the Florida International League. In approving the league for membership, the committee issued a statement saying that: "Havana be given permission to enter the National Association for the purpose of playing professional baseball in Havana, Cuba, under the rules and regulations of the National Association on strict probation, from month to month, until they have satisfied the membership of the National Association that they are operating and working under said rules."

After its formation, the Florida International League became the first professional baseball league to use air transportation on a regular basis. The league partnered with Pan American Airways to provide teams charter service to Havana from Miami and Tampa.

In their first season in the new league, the Lakeland Pilots placed fifth in the 1946 Florida International League regular season standings. The Pilots ended the season with a final record of 53–74. Lakeland began the season under the leadership of player-manager Ray Hunt and the team had compiled a record of 25–33 record when Hunt was replaced. Hunt was succeeded as manager by Bill Perrin, who led the team to a 28–41 record under his leadership. Lakeland finished 26.0 games behind the first place Havana Cubans in the final Florida International League regular season standings. Havana won the pennant with a 76-41 official record, which included 17 wins being overturned due to roster improprieties of utilizing an "excessive" amount of veteran players. With their fifth-place finish Lakeland did not qualify for the four-team playoffs, won by the Tampa Smokers over West Palm Beach in the finals.

In his tenure as player-manager Ray Hunt played at catcher for Lakeland in 1946. Hunt also pitched in 18 games. Playing 32 games at catcher, Hunt batted. 235 on the season. As a pitcher, Hunt had a 1–5 record in 18 games, 2 games as a starter, with a 4.32 ERA. Replacing Hunt as player-manager during the 1946 season at age 36, Lakeland pitcher Bill Perrin began a three-season tenure serving as the Pilots' player-manager. Perrin compiled a 2–1 record with a 4.02 ERA pitching in 14 games for Lakeland.

Lakeland continued play in the 1947 Florida International League as pitcher Bill Perrin continued as the Pilots' player-manager. The season ended with Lakeland having the distinction of being one of two league teams accumulating over 100 losses. With a final record of 50–101, the Pilots ended the season in seventh place, finishing ahead of the last place Fort Lauderdale Braves, who finished with a final record of 48–106 in the eight-team league. Playing the entire season under Perrin, Lakeland finished 55.0 games behind first place Havana in the final standings. The Florida International League also had two 100 game winning teams in 1947. The Tampa Smokers won 104 games and finished second to the first place Havana Cubans with their record of 105–45. Lakeland not qualify for the four-team playoffs, that concluded with Havana sweeping Tampa in four games in the finals. The 1947 Havana Cubans team was recognized as one of the 100 greatest minor league teams of all time. The Pilots' player-manager Bill Perrin pitched in 29 games in 1947 and compiled a 3–7 record with a 2.85 ERA in 117 innings for Lakeland.

In 1948, Bill Perrin returned to begin his third season as the Lakeland player-manager, as the Pilots continued play in the Florida International League. The Pilots were greatly improved in the 1948 season, qualifying for the playoffs following their 101 loss season. During the 1948 season Perrin had led the Pilots to a 23–23 record when he left Lakeland and became the player-manager of the league rival Miami Tourists. After his departure, Perrin was replaced as manager by Pilot player Chuck Aleno who led Lakeland to a 59–46 record during his managerial tenure. In the final 1948 Florida International League regular season standings, Lakeland ended the season in third place with an 82–72 record. The Pilots finished 15.0 games behind the first place Havana Cubans. Taking over during the season, Chuck Aleno led the Pilots to the four-team playoffs. A former major league player, Alano had played parts of four seasons as primarily a third baseman for the Cincinnati Reds from 1941 to 1944.

In the 1948 Florida International League playoffs, Lakeland lost in first round, being swept by Havana in three games. For the second season in a row, Lakeland finished last in the league in home attendance, drawing 57,752 for the 1948 season. Havana drew 205,967 to lead the league. Bryan Howell of Lakeland had 190 total hits on the season, most in the Florida International League. The Pilots had two 20-game winning pitchers in 1948. At age 24, in his second of four seasons with Lakeland, Antonio Garcia had a 22–14 record with a 3.47 ERA and 24 complete games. Bernard Winkler had a 21–13 record for the Pilots, with a 3.78 in 48 games, throwing 293 innings and 20 complete games.

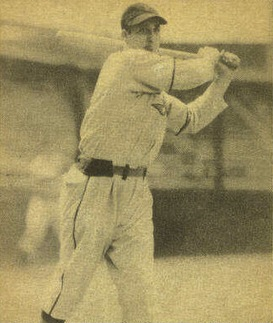
(1940) Johnny Rizzo, Pittsburgh Pirates. Play Ball baseball card. Rizzo was the player-manager the 1949 Lakeland Pilots.

Lakeland continued play in the 1949 Florida International League with a new manager. At age 36, Johnny Rizzo became the Lakeland Pilots' player-manager for the 1949 season, his first experience in the managerial role. In his major league career prior to joining Lakeland, Rizzo batted .270 with 61 career home runs while playing for the Pittsburgh Pirates (1938–1940), Cincinnati Reds (1940), Philadelphia Phillies (1940–1941) and Brooklyn Dodgers (1942). Following his 1942 season with Brooklyn at the onset of World War II, Rizzo enlisted in the United States Navy in December 1942, just days before a ban placed by President Roosevelt on such enlistments. After serving in the United States Navy until his discharge in 1945, Rizzo resumed his professional playing career in 1946 at age 33 but never returned to major leagues. In what became his final season in professional baseball, Johnny Rizzo played both third base and the outfield for Lakeland. Rizzo batted .311 with 9 home runs and 64 RBIs on the season. Rizzo worked in the sporting goods industry and as an automobile salesman following his playing career.

Pitching for the 1949 Lakeland Pilots at age 44, Luke Hamlin appeared in 15 games with 7 complete games and two shutouts. Hamlin had previously pitched in the major leagues with the Detroit Tigers (1933–1934), Brooklyn Dodgers (1937–1941), Pittsburgh Pirates (1942) and Philadelphia Athletics (1944), compiling a 73–76 record, with 9 saves and a 3.77 ERA in 261 career games.

Lakeland ended the 1949 season in last place, as the Florida International League became a Class B level league, the equivalent of a Class AA league today. The Pilots ended the season with a final record of 60–92, finishing in eighth place in the eight-team league, playing the season under Johnny Rizzo. Lakeland finished 35.0 games behind first place Havana in the standings and also finished last in home attendance, drawing 50,108, with Havana drawing 226,293. With their lase place finish, Lakeland did not qualify for the four-team playoffs, won by the Tampa Smokers, who swept Havana in the final after ending the regular season in fourth place 14.5 games behind Havanna.

Following their last place finish, Lakeland had a new manager to begin the 1950 Florida International League season. At age 32, Charlie Cuellar was hired as the Lakeland Pilots' manager in 1950 before leaving the team and making his major league debut as a player during the season. A pitcher, Cuellar's minor league career spanned from 1935 to 1953 and he won over 200 games in the minors, pitching a no-hitter in 1947. "I loved every minute of it. My life was baseball." said Cuellar. Cuellar resigned as the Lakeland manager on June 17, 1950, after the Pilots had lost a 4–2 game to the Tampa Smokers. Lakeland had compiled a record of 29-45 playing under Cuellar at the time of his resignation. On June 25, 1950, the Chicago White Sox announced that Cuellar had joined the team in Detroit and noted that Johnny Rizzo, pushed to get him to the majors and Charlie was a "St. Petersburg neighbor" of Chicago White Sox General Manager Frank Lane. Cuellar made his debut with the White Sox on July 2, 1950. Cuellar appeared in two games with the White Sox, surrendering 6 runs in 1.1 innings in his only major league appearances.

The Lakeland Pilots struggled in the 1950 season, as the Pilots ended the regular season in seventh place in the eight-team Class B level Florida International League. Lakeland ended the season with a record of 57–93, playing under managers Charlie Cuellar (29–45) and his replacement as player-manager Bill Ankoviak, who had compiled a 28–48 record in replacing Cuellar. Lakeland finished the season 44.0 games behind the first place Havana Cubans, who won their fifth consecutive Florida International League pennant. The Pilots did not qualify for the four-team playoffs, won by the Miami Sun Sox over Havana in the finals. Playing first base in 149 games for Lakeland, plater-manager Androviak batted .262 with 6 home runs and 70 RBIs for the Pilots in 1950, handling his dual role at age 26. Lakeland outfielder LaVern Mayer had the distinction of striking out exactly 100 times with 0 home runs on the season, batting .254 with 10 doubles and 11 triples and 4 stolen bases in 149 games.

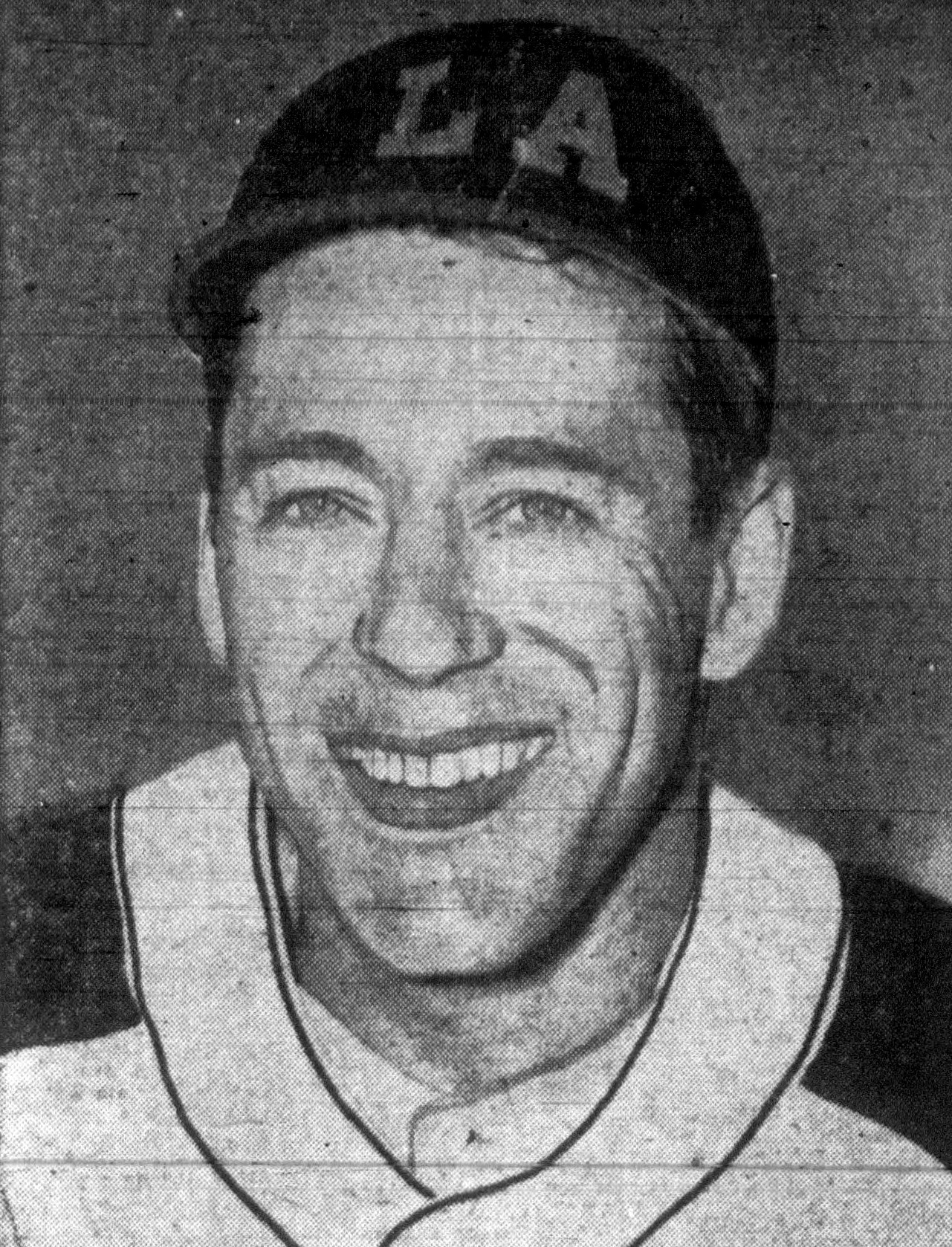
(1943) Roy "Sage" Hughes, Los Angeles Angels. at age 40, Hughes was the player-manager of the 1951 Lakeland Pilots, batting .346 in 61 games as a player and leading the team to the playoffs.

Roy Hughes became the Lakeland player-manager in 1951 in his first managerial role. At age 40, in what became his final professional baseball season, Hughes joined Lakeland after playing 63 games during the 1950 season with the Columbus Red Birds. With Hughes at the helm in leading the team, Lakeland rebounded from their prior season and qualified for the Florida International League playoffs in 1951. The 1951 Lakeland team was also referred to as the "Patriots" in some references. The Pilots ended the regular season with a record of 71–68 to finish in fourth place in the Florida International League regular season, playing the season under Roy Hughes. Lakeland ended the regular season finishing 18.5 games behind the first place Tampa Smokers, as the previously dominant Havana Cubans ended the season in fifth place, just behind Lakeland in the standings. In the four-team playoffs, Lakeland lost in first round to the eventual champion St. Petersburg Saints 3 games to 2. St. Petersburg the swept the Miami Sun Sox in the finals.

Playing third base and second base with Lakeland, player-manager Roy Hughes batted .346 with a .409 OBP while appearing in 61 games for the Pilots in 1951. Hughes previously played in the major leagues with the Cleveland Indians (1935–1937), St. Louis Browns (1938–1939), Philadelphia Phillies (1939–1940), Chicago Cubs (1944–1945) and Philadelphia Phillies (1946) batting .273 in 763 career games.

Outfielder Ted Cieslak of Lakeland won the Florida International League batting championship in 1951, batting .332. Playing with Lakeland at age 38, Cieslak had previously played in the major leagues with the 1944 Philadelphia Phillies, batting .255 in 84 games.

Former major league all-star pitcher Rip Sewell was named as the Lakeland manager for the 1952 season. Following the conclusion of his playing career, Sewell become a minor league manager and first managed the 1950 Charleston Rebels. Sewell came to Lakeland in 1952 after having managed the New Orleans Pelicans of the Southern Association in 1951. A four-time major league All-Star, Sewell had pitched for the Detroit Tigers (1932) and Pittsburgh Pirates (1938–1949), retiring as a player at age 42. Sewell compiled a 143–97 record with a 3.48 ERA in 390 career games with 137 complete games in his lengthy major league career.

Beginning the season playing in the Class B level Florida International League, the Pilots has compiled a record of 10–20 under Rip Sewell before he was replaced as manager by Bud Bates after thirty games. Bates led the team to a record of 41–83 over the remaining season. Lakeland lost over 100 games in 1952, ending the season with a record of 51–103 and finishing in seventh place. The Florida International League had two teams losing more than 100 games, as Lakeland finished 9.5 games ahead of the last place Key West Conchs who ended the season with a 40–111 record. Lakeland ended the season 54.0 games behind the first place Miami Sun Sox and finished last in the league in home attendance, drawing 43,909, as Miami Led the league with 124,203. With their seventh-place finish, Lakeland did not qualify for the four-team playoffs won by Miami over Miami Beach in the finals.

The Class B level Florida International League continued play in the 1953 season without Lakeland as a member. The league reduced to a six-team league in 1953, folding both the Miami Beach and Lakeland franchises. Two seasons after Lakeland's departure, the Florida International League permanently folded following the 1954 season.

=== 1953: Pilots rejoin Florida State League ===
After beginning the 1953 season without a minor league team, Lakeland rejoined the eight-team Florida State League during the league's 1953 season. Lakeland rejoined the league, marking a 27 year span in membership as Lakeland last played in the league in 1926. The Class D level Florida State League began its 1953 season with the Cocoa Indians, Daytona Beach Islanders (Cleveland Indians affiliate), DeLand Red Hats, Jacksonville Beach Sea Birds, Leesburg Lakers, Orlando Senators (Washington Senators), Palatka Azaleas and Sanford Giants (St. Louis Cardinals) teams beginning the schedule on April 13, 1953. The league season began without Lakeland as a member.

On May 15, 1953, the Palatka Azaleas franchise relocated to Lakeland, Florida. Continuing play in Lakeland, the team again adopted the "Pilots" nickname and resumed playing home games at Henley Park. The Palatka Azaleas had compiled a record of 13–22 at the time of their move to Lakeland. After the move, the Pilots completed the season schedule and compiled a 34–67 record while based Lakeland. The team ended the season with an overall record of 47-89 based in the two cities. During the 1953 season the team had five different managers. Charles Baird was the manager to begin the season and compiled a 13–23 record as the manager while the team was based in Palatka. Having previously managed for the Pilots in 1948, Chuck Aleno returned to Lakeland after beginning the 1953 season as a player for the Palatka Azaleas. Aleno left the team after the move having compiled a record of 27–39 as a player-manager. The team preceded to compile a 20–50 record after Aleno's departure. Aleno was followed as the Lakeland manager by Peter Kantor (6–15), Paul Crawford (0–10) and Al Pirtle (1–2), totaling five managers for the season.

With their overall record of 47–89 between the two cities, the Pilots ended the season in last place in the eight-team league, finishing 39.5 games behind the first place Daytona Beach Islanders in the overall standings. The Florida State League played a split season schedule, with Daytona Beach winning the first half pennant and the DeLand Red Hats winning the second half title. In the finals, Daytona Beach defeated DeLand.

Playing third base and first base as player-manager, Chuck Aleno batted .305 in 64 games for the Pilots, with 6 home runs and 50 RBIs in his final professional season at age 36. Aleno also pitched in 17 games, with a 1–3 record and a 3.22 ERA. Playing first base, Charlie Baird batted .288 in 21 games as age 30. Biard had played the previous four seasons for Palatka. At age 29, second baseman Peter Kantor had played for Lakeland from 1948 to 1950 and returned to the team in 1953, batting .354 in his 21 games, which were the final games of his career. At age 29, catcher Paul Crawford batted .379 in 40 at bats in his 10 games as player-manager. Outfielder Al Pirtle batted .337 in 1953 with 11 home runs and 82 RBIs in his final professional baseball season at age 28. Pirtle drew 59 walks against 11 strikeouts in 471 plate appearances in 105 games.

=== 1954 & 1955: Florida State League championship ===
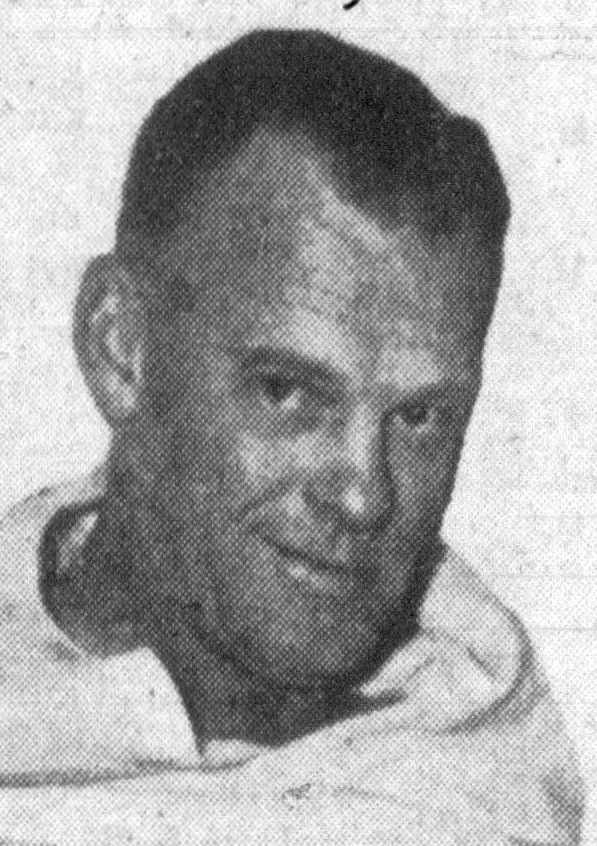
(1949) Rip Sewell. A former MLB All-Star pitcher, Sewell managed the Lakeland Pilots in both the 1952 and 1954 seasons. Sewell led the Pilots to the 1954 Florida State League championship after taking over the team early in the season.

Having briefly managed the team two years prior, Rip Sewell returned to manage the Lakeland Pilots during the 1954 Florida State League season with championship results. In 1954, the Lakeland Pilots rebounded from their last place finish and became the 1954 Florida State League champions. Continuing play in the six-team Class D level league, the Pilots ended the regular season with a record of 71–67. The Pilots starting the season playing under manager James Bello. The Pilots and had compiled a record of 7–11 when Bello was replaced as the Pilots' manager by the returning Rip Sewell. Under Sewell the team improved and compiled a record of 64–56 under his leadership. Lakeland qualified for the playoffs by winning a pennant in the split season schedule. The Pilots started their run to the Florida State League championship after finishing 7.0 games behind the first place Orlando Senators in the overall standings, ending the season in fourth place overall. However, as the Florida State League played a split season schedule, Lakeland had won the second half pennant after the regular season third place team, the Jacksonville Beach Sea Birds (who were a Cleveland Indians affiliate) had won the first half pennant. In the finals, Lakeland defeated Jacksonville 3 games to 2 to claim the Florida State League championship. Their 1954 championship occurred 30 seasons after Lakeland's previous Florida Stat League title.

Playing first base in his 18-game tenure for Lakeland to begin the season, the Pilots' player-manager James Bello batted .319 with 20 RBIs in the only managerial position of his career.

As defending champions in 1955, Lakeland ended the season in seventh place, as the Florida State league returned to an playing eight-team league, adding the Gainesville G-Men and Sanford Cardinals (St. Louis Cardinals affiliate) teams as expansion franchises. The Pilots ended the season with a record of 57–81 playing the entire season under manager Jim Turner. Lakeland ended the regular season 34.0 games behind the first place Orlando C.B.s, who were a Washington Senators minor league affiliate. No championship playoff series was held as Orlando won both halves of the split-season schedule. Lakeland finished last in the Florida State League in home attendance, drawing 28,130 for the season, as Orlando led the league drawing 46,370.

The Lakeland Pilots did not return to play in the 1956 Florida State League. Ironically the Pilots were replaced in the eight-team Class D level league by the Palatka Tigers franchise, three seasons after from Palatka's move to Lakeland in 1953 gave the Pilots league membership.

Lakeland remained without a minor league team until 1960 when the Lakeland Indians were formed. The Lakeland Indians resumed Lakeland's play in the Florida State League, when the league expanded from a six-team league in 1959 to an eight-team league in 1960. Lakeland won the 1960 league pennant. After resuming play in 1960, the minor league franchise has continued in Lakeland, evolving to become today's Lakeland Flying Tigers.

== The ballparks ==
From 1919 to 1922, the Lakeland Highlanders hosted home games at the Lakeland Ballpark. In the era, the ballpark was located at North Florida Avenue (RF) at West Bella Vista Street in Lakeland. Today, the former ballpark parcel contains Simpson Park. Today, Simpson Park is a public park with greenspace, a pool, library, playgrounds, tennis courts, a community center and an indoor gymnasium. Simpson Park is located at 1725 Martin Luther King Jr. Avenue in Lakeland, Florida.

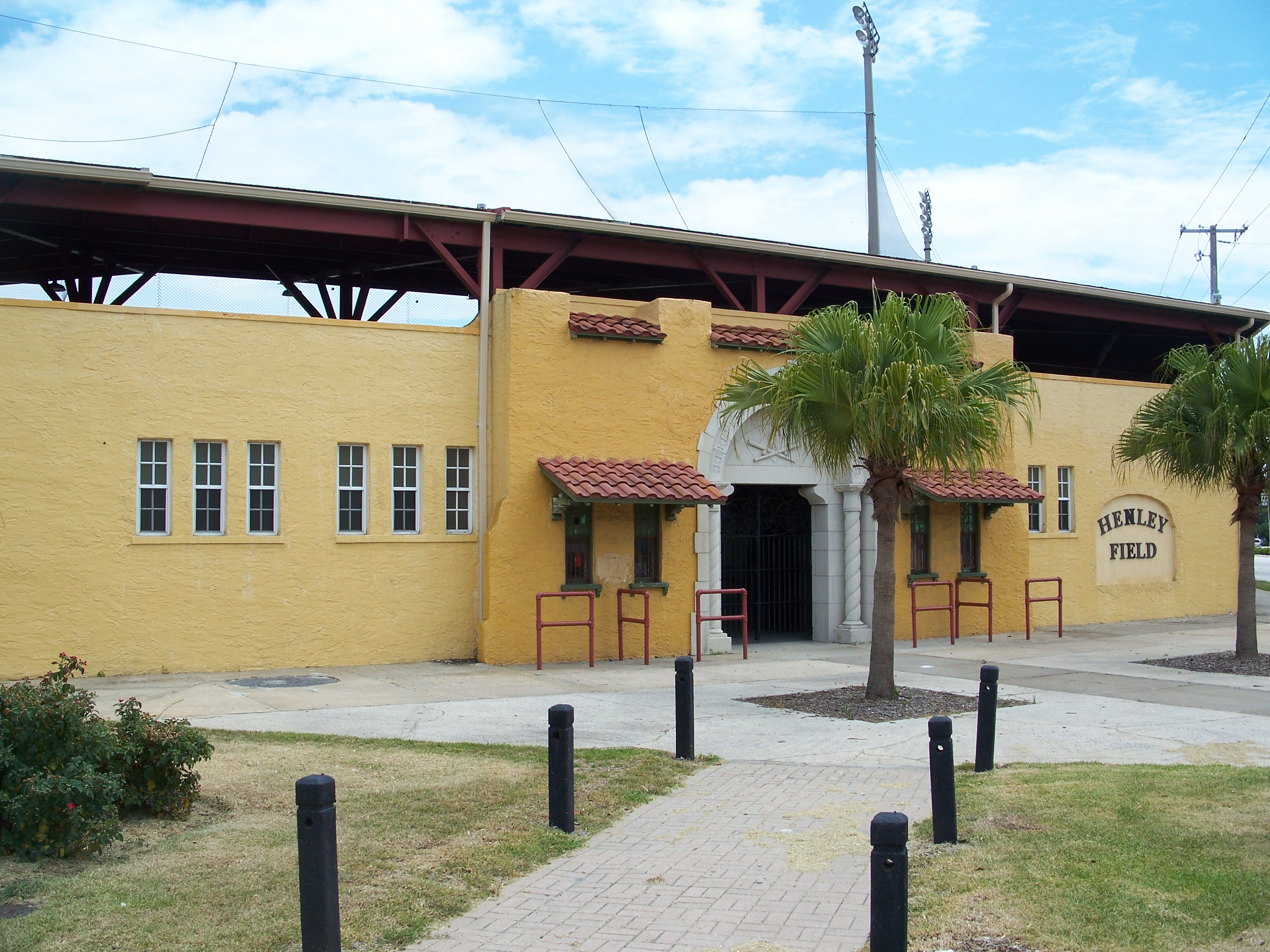
(2009) Henley Field, Lakeland, Florida. National Register of Historic Places. In 1923, Lakeland minor league teams began play at the then newly built ballpark.

Beginning in 1923, Lakeland hosted home minor league games at Henley Field, which was first called Adair Athletic Park. The ballpark was constructed in 1922 and was renamed for Clare Henley in 1942. Henly had led the efforts for the ballpark construction in an effort to secure a major league team for spring training and also host the minor league team. In 1997, Henley Field was listed National Register of Historic Places. The ballpark was used by the Lakeland Highlanders from 1923 to 1926, while simultaneously serving as the spring training site for the Cleveland Indians through 1927. After the ballpark was constructed, the Cleveland Indians’ groundskeeper Frank Van Dellen spent the winter of 1922–1923 in Lakeland, creating the playing field at the ballpark. The Detroit Tigers then held spring training at the ballpark from 1934 to 1942 and 1946 to 1965. The Detroit Tigers have remained in Lakeland for Spring training and today host spring training games at Publix Field at Joker Marchant Stadium. Opened in 1966, Publix Field at Joker Marchant Stadium also hosts the Lakeland Flying Tigers.

Clarie Henley was the president of the Lakeland Baseball Club when the ballpark was built in 1923. Henley was instrumental in securing the Cleveland Indians as a tenant, with the Indians utilizing the ballpark for spring training in Lakeland. Before Henley, the ballpark was first named Adair Athletic Park, as the ballpark was built on a parcel of land purchased from Dr. Pike Adair by the city of Lakeland.

Today, the park serves as the home to Florida Southern College, whose Florida Southern Moccasins baseball teams began playing at the ballpark in 1966. Located adjacent to Bryant Stadium, Henley Field is located is at 1125 North Florida Avenue in Lakeland.

Today's Lakeland Flying Tigers play at the former site of Lodwick Field, the Pilots' namesake airfield. The former Lodwick Field airfield is the now the site of Publix Field at Joker Marchant Stadium.

== Timeline ==
Year(s)	# Yrs.	Team	Level	League	Affiliate	Ballpark(s)
1919–1920	2	Lakeland Highlanders	Class D	Florida State League	None	Lakeland Ballpark
1921–1922	2	Lakeland Highlanders	Class C	Florida State League	None	Lakeland Ballpark
1923–1924	2	Lakeland Highlanders	Class C	Florida State League	None	Henley Field
1925–1926	2	Lakeland Highlanders	Class D	Florida State League	None	Henley Field
1946–1948	3	Lakeland Pilots	Class C	Florida International League	None	Henley Field
1949–1952	4	Lakeland Pilots	Class B	Florida International League	None	Henley Field
1953–1956	4	Lakeland Pilots	Class D	Florida State League	None	Henley Field

== Year–by–year records ==
Year	Record	Finish	Manager	Playoffs/Notes
1919	40–37	3rd	Bill Pierre / Hugh Wicker	No playoffs held
1920	50–65	6th	Jim Manes	No playoffs held
1921	59–57	3rd	Joe Wall / Perry Wilder; Harry Swacina / Bill Zimmerman; Milt Reed	No playoffs held
1922	52–61	5th	Doug Harbison	No playoffs held
1923	60–55	3rd	Tommy Leach	No playoffs held
1924	77–42	1st	Tommy Leach	League folded August 8 League champions
1925	70–52	2nd	Bill Brazier	1st half pennant
1926	65–49	4th	Roy Ellam	No playoffs held
1946	53–74	5th	Ray Hunt (25–33) / Bill Perrin (28–41)	Did not qualify
1947	50–101	7th	Bill Perrin	Did not qualify
1948	82–72	3rd	Bill Perrin (23–23) / Chuck Aleno (59–46)	Lost in 1st round
1949	60–92	8th	Johnny Rizzo	Did not qualify
1950	57–93	7th	Charlie Cuellar (29–45) / Bill Ankoviak (28–48)	Did not qualify
1951	71–68	4th	Roy Hughes	Lost in 1st round
1952	51–103	7th	Rip Sewell (10–20) / Bud Bates (41–83)	Did not qualify
1953	34–67	8th	Chuck Aleno (27–39); Charles Baird (13–23) / Peter Kantor (6–15); Paul Crawford (0–10) / Al Pirtle (1–2)	Palatka (13–22) moved to Lakeland May 15; Did not qualify
1954	71–67	4th	James Bello (7–11) / Rip Sewell (64–56)	1st half pennant League champions
1955	57–81	7th	Jim Turner	Did not qualify

== Notable alumni ==
- Homer Norton (1921) College Football Hall of Fame
- Chuck Aleno (1948, 1953, MGR)
- Bud Bates (1952, MGR)
- Bill Burgo (1951)
- Ted Cieslak (1951–1952)
- Chet Covington (1952)
- Charlie Cuellar (1949; 1950, MGR)
- Tom Drake (1948)
- Roy Ellam (1926, MGR)
- Woody Fair (1951–1952)
- Lew Groh (1921)
- Luke Hamlin (1949)
- Don Hankins (1923)
- Roy Hughes (1951, MGR)
- Bert Humphries (1921–1922)
- Tommy Leach (1923–1924, MGR)
- Ted Pawelek (1951–1952)
- Jim Pearce (1949)
- Bill Perrin (1946–1948, MGR)
- Milt Reed (1921, MGR)
- Johnny Rizzo (1949, MGR)
- Antonio Rodríguez (1951)
- Paul Schreiber (1920)
- Rip Sewell (1952, 1954, MGR) 4x MLB All-Star
- Harry Smythe (1922)
- Harry Swacina (1921, MGR)
- Roy Valdés (1949)
- Roberto Vargas (1951) NgL All-Star
- Joe Wall (1921, MGR)
- Bill Webb (1948)
- Les Witherspoon (1954)
- Bill Zimmerman (1921, MGR)

== See also ==
- Lakeland Pilots players
- Lakeland Highlanders players
