= Chico Carrasquel =

Venezuelan baseball player, coach, scout, and manager (1926–2005)

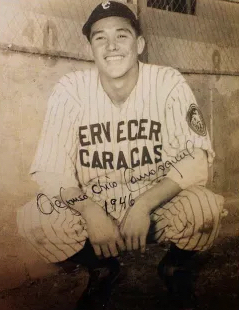
- Shortstop
- Born: January 23, 1926; Caracas, Venezuela
- Died: May 26, 2005 (aged 79); Caracas, Venezuela
- Batted: Right Threw: Right

MLB debut
- April 18, 1950, for the Chicago White Sox

Last MLB appearance
- September 23, 1959, for the Baltimore Orioles

MLB statistics
- Batting average: .258
- Home runs: 55
- Runs batted in: 474
- Stats at Baseball Reference

Teams
- Chicago White Sox (1950–1955); Cleveland Indians (1956–1958); Kansas City Athletics (1958); Baltimore Orioles (1959)

Career highlights and awards
- 4× All-Star (1951, 1953–1955)

Member of the Venezuelan

Baseball Hall of Fame
- Induction: 2003
Medals
Men's baseball
Representing Venezuela
Baseball World Cup
Gold medal – first place	1945 Caracas	Team

Alfonso Carrasquel Colón, better known as Chico Carrasquel (January 23, 1926 – May 26, 2005), was a Venezuelan professional baseball player, coach, scout and manager. He played in Major League Baseball (MLB) as a shortstop from 1950 to 1959, most prominently as a member of the Chicago White Sox where he became the first Latin American in MLB history to start in an All-Star Game in 1951. A four-time All-Star known for his exceptional defensive skills, Carrasquel was the first in a long line of Major League shortstops from Venezuela including, Luis Aparicio, Dave Concepción, Ozzie Guillén and Omar Vizquel among others. He also played for the Cleveland Indians, Kansas City Athletics and the Baltimore Orioles.

After his playing career, Carrasquel worked as a manager in the Venezuelan Winter League and also worked as a major league scout. He later worked as a color commentator on the White Sox' Spanish language game broadcasts and, as the team's Community Relations Representative. In 2003, he was selected in the inaugural class of the Venezuelan Baseball Hall of Fame and Museum.

== Playing career ==
Born in Caracas, Carrasquel was the nephew of Alex Carrasquel and the brother of Martin and Domingo Carrasquel, all of whom played professional baseball. He began his professional career in 1946 at the age of 17 with the Cervecería Caracas team, where he hit the first home run in Venezuelan Professional Baseball League history. He was signed in 1949 by the Brooklyn Dodgers, and was immediately promoted to the Double-A Fort Worth Cats. Carrasquel provided good fielding and hit .315 during the season and .364 in the playoffs to help spur the Cats to the 1949 Texas League championship. His inability to speak English fluently may have caused Dodgers General Manager Branch Rickey to sell him to the Chicago White Sox although, Rickey later admitted that the move was a mistake. White Sox' General Manager Frank Lane solved the language communication problem by trading Carrasquel's uncle Alex for reliever Witto Aloma, who served as the interpreter between Carrasquel and White Sox' manager Jack Onslow.

Carrasquel joined the White Sox in 1950, becoming the third Venezuelan to play in Major League Baseball after his uncle, Alex Carrasquel (Washington Senators, 1939) and Chucho Ramos (Cincinnati Reds, in 1944). He became the White Sox's starting shortstop, replacing the 41-year-old Luke Appling, who had held the position since 1930. Carrasquel soon established himself as an excellent defensive player, combining with second baseman Nellie Fox to make one of the best double play combinations in the league. His cheerful disposition and apparent love for playing baseball, made him extremely popular with Chicago fans. As a rookie, Carrasquel hit for a career-high .282 batting average in 141 games and, amassed a 24-game hitting streak until Red Sox pitcher Ellis Kinder stopped the streak. In September, he suffered a torn cartilage in his right knee and had to sit out the remainder of the season. Carrasquel finished the season ranked third in voting for the American League Rookie of the Year Award, behind Walt Dropo and Whitey Ford, and finished 12th in the 1950 American League Most Valuable Player Award ballot.

In 1951, Carrasquel beat out the reigning American League Most Valuable Player, Phil Rizzuto, in voting for the shortstop of the American League in the 1951 All-Star Game. He became the first Latin American player to be selected to start in an All-Star Game. On July 19, 1951, Carrasquel broke Rizzuto's Major League record by handling 297 consecutive chances in 53 games without committing an error. The record would stand for 18 years until 1969, when Don Kessinger of the Chicago Cubs set a new record by playing in 54 games without committing an error. He ended the year leading the league's shortstops in assists and in fielding percentage. In November 1951, it was reported that Boston Red Sox manager, Lou Boudreau, wanted to trade Ted Williams for Carrasquel but Lane refused the offer.

Carrasquel had an off year in 1952 as a broken finger and then weight problems saw his batting average drop to .248 in 100 games. After the 1952 season, trade rumors reportedly had the Cleveland Indians offering the American League's runs batted in champion, Al Rosen, in exchange for Carrasquel but, the trade never transpired. In 1953, Carrasquel was once again voted as the starting shortstop for the American League in the 1953 All-Star Game and ended the season first among the league's shortstops in fielding percentage. On August 3, 1953, the White Sox played the Washington Senators who fielded shortstop Pompeyo Davalillo, marking the first time in Major League history that two Venezuelan players faced each other on opposing teams.

During spring training in 1954, it was reported that White Sox manager Paul Richards was not pleased with Carrasquel's lack of effort on the field. It was a charge that would continue to pursue Carrasquel for the remainder of his tenure with the White Sox. Carrasquel responded with his most productive season in 1954, when he was voted to make his third start as the American League shortstop in the 1954 All-Star Game and, posted career-highs in home runs (12), RBI (62), hits (158), runs (106), extra-base hits (43), walks (85). Batting as the White Sox leadoff hitter, he led the league in games played and in plate appearances while hitting for a .255 batting average. Defensively, he led the league's shortstops in double plays and in fielding percentage.

In July 1955, new White Sox manager, Marty Marion, replaced Carrasquel in favor of shortstop Jim Brideweser, citing Carrasquel's lackadaisical efforts and indifferent attitude towards playing. There was some speculation among major league managers that, playing in the Venezuelan Winter League during the off-season might be wearing him down. Between spring training, the regular major league season, and then a season of winter baseball in Venezuela, Carrasquel was playing in more than 200 games a year. Despite this setback, Carrasquel was still selected to his fourth All-Star game, this time as a reserve behind Harvey Kuenn. He still showed flashes of his former self as in a game against the Baltimore Orioles on August 23 when, he scored from first base on a bunt. Nellie Fox hit a bunt down the third base line and, when Orioles third baseman, Gus Triandos, left his base to field the ball, Carrasquel rounded second base and continued to third, where he was called safe on a close play. When the Orioles argued with the umpire without calling a time out, Carrasquel dashed to home plate without drawing a throw. Although his dedication was being called into question by Marion and the sporting press, Carrasquel still finished among the league leaders in assists, putouts and in fielding percentage.

Carrasquel had been instrumental in helping the White Sox sign another young, Venezuelan shortstop named Luis Aparicio, who went on to become a perennial All-Star player and was eventually inducted into the Hall of Fame. By 1955, Aparicio was deemed ready to play in the major leagues and, with Marion dissatisfied with Carrasquel's level of play, he was traded along with Jim Busby to the Cleveland Indians for Larry Doby in October of that year.

After two and a half seasons with the Indians, Carrasquel was traded to the Kansas City Athletics for Billy Hunter in June 1958. He played half a season for the Athletics before they traded him to the Baltimore Orioles for Dick Williams in October 1958. On May 10, 1959, Carrasquel was hit above his left eye by a thrown baseball as he was running the base paths and had to be carried off the field. During a physical examination in September, it was discovered that Carrasquel only had fifty percent of his vision in his left eye, perhaps stemming from the May incident. He ended the year with a career-low .223 batting average and in December the Orioles released him. He became a free agent and signed a contract to play for the Chicago White Sox in January 1960 but was released at the beginning of the season. Carrasquel then signed with the Montreal Royals of the International League in April 1960 but was released after hitting for a .206 average in 35 games.

== Career statistics ==
In a ten-year major league career, Carrasquel played in 1,325 games, accumulating 1,199 hits in 4,644 at bats for a .258 career batting average along with 55 home runs, 474 runs batted in and a .333 on-base percentage. He was a disciplined hitter, posting a solid 1.052 walk-to-strikeout ratio (491-to-467). A four-time All-Star, Carrasquel led the American League three times in fielding percentage, once in assists and finished his career with a .969 fielding percentage.

Carrasquel had 5 hits and scored 5 runs in a game against the Kansas City Athletics on April 23, 1955. He also had two other games in which he had 5 hits. Carrasquel had a career-high 7 runs batted in during a game against the Athletics on April 26, 1956.

== Managing career and later life ==
Carrasquel returned to his native Venezuela where continued to play in the Venezuelan Winter League until 1967 when, he retired as an active player at the age of 41. He later became the manager of the Leones del Caracas, leading them to the 1982 Caribbean Series championship title. Carrasquel also spent time as a scout for the Kansas City Royals and the New York Mets. He later worked as a color commentator on the White Sox' Spanish language broadcasts from 1990 to 1996 and, as the team's Community Relations Representative until 2002. In 2004, Carrasquel helped start a nonprofit foundation to help underprivileged children in Venezuela and the United States. The Chico Carrasquel Foundation transports barrio youngsters to YMCA centers, museums, baseball games, and historical places throughout Venezuela.

== Honors ==
In 1991, the Venezuelan Professional Baseball League honored Carrasquel by renaming the Puerto la Cruz baseball stadium as the Estadio Alfonso Chico Carrasquel. The VPBL also honors annually the best manager in the league with the Chico Carrasquel Award.

In 2003, Carrasquel was selected in the inaugural class of the Venezuelan Baseball Hall of Fame and Museum.

On the occasion of Ozzie Guillén's first home game as White Sox manager in the 2004 season, Carrasquel joined Guillén and fellow Venezuelans Luis Aparicio and Dave Concepción in throwing out the first ball at the home opener. Carrasquel called it his proudest moment.

== Legacy ==
As the first Venezuelan to become a star player in Major League Baseball, Carrasquel became a national idol and was an influential figure in his native country. His accomplishments as a player influenced the aspirations of future Latin players including Aparicio and, helped pave the way for their baseball careers.

Carrasquel's influence in Venezuela may have extended into the geopolitical arena as well. At a time during the Cold War when communists threatened to destabilize the country, Walter Donnelly, the United States Ambassador to Venezuela, arranged for Carrasquel's family to come to Yankee Stadium for an event honoring him in July 1950. Donnelly told Collier's magazine that "he honestly believed the event was a setback for communist propagandists in Venezuela. Under no circumstances could a similar trip have been made to Russia or any of the satellite countries."

Carrasquel's uncle, Alex Carrasquel, and his nephew Cris Colón, also played in Major League Baseball. Carrasquel died of cardiac/respiratory arrest in Caracas, Venezuela on May 26, 2005 at the age of 77.

== See also ==
- List of Venezuelan players in MLB
