= Henley Field =

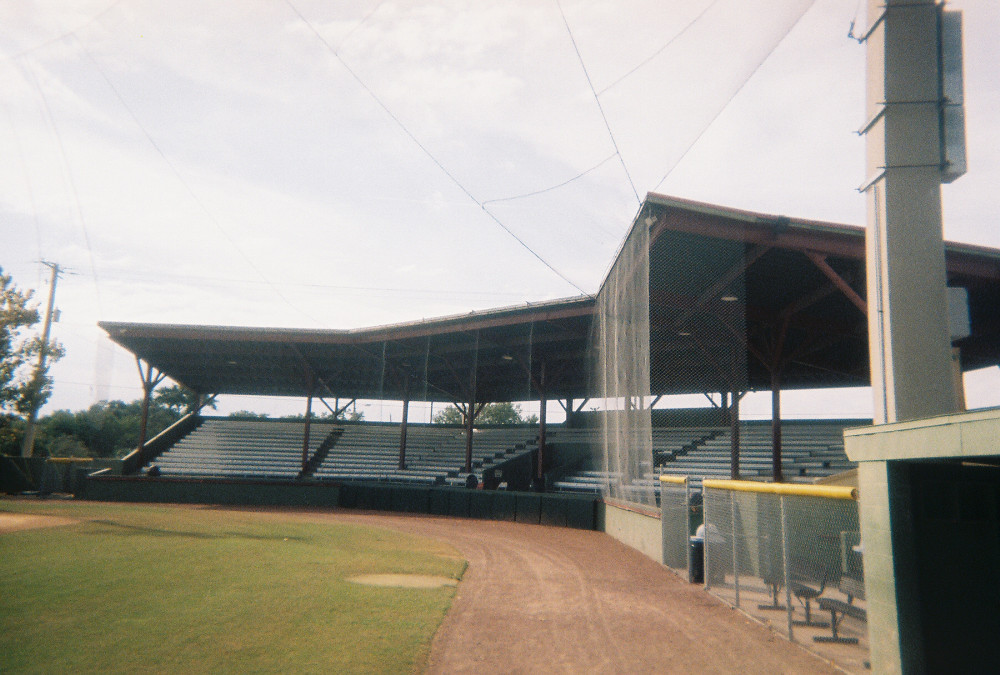
- Interactive map of Henley Field
- Full name: Athletic Park (1925–1942); Clare "Doc" Henley Ball Park (1942–present)
- Location: 1125 North Florida Avenue, Lakeland, Florida 33805-4645
- Owner: Lakeland Parks and Recreation Department (Pending sale to Florida Southern College)
- Operator: Lakeland Parks and Recreation Department
- Capacity: 1,000
- Surface: Grass
- Field size: Left – 325 ft Left center – 365 ft Center – 405 ft Right center - 385 ft Right – 330 ft

Construction
- Built: 1922
- Opened: 17 March 1925; 101 years ago
- Renovated: 2002
- Cost: $

Tenants
- Lakeland Highlanders (FSL) (1923–1926); Cleveland Indians (AL) (1923–1927); Detroit Tigers (AL) (1934–1942, 1946–1965); Lakeland Pilots (FIL) (1946-1950, 1952); Lakeland Patriots (FIL) (1951); Lakeland Pilots (FSL) (1953-1955); Lakeland Indians (FSL) (1960); Lakeland Giants (FSL) (1962); Lakeland Tigers (FSL) (1963-1964, 2002); Florida Southern College Moccasins (SSC) (1960s-present); Lakeland Flying Tigers (FSL) (2016)

- Henley Field
- U.S. National Register of Historic Places
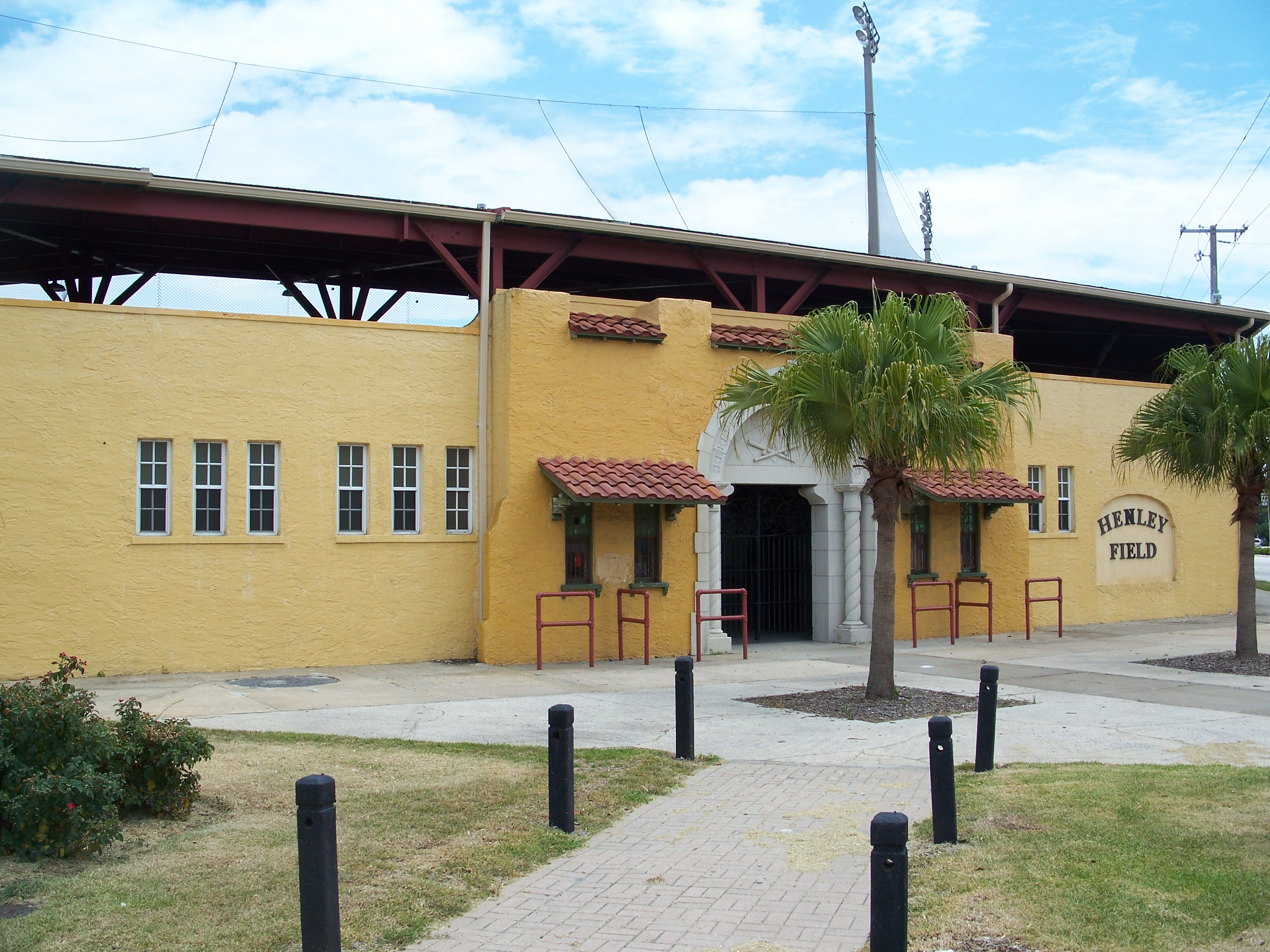

- Location within Florida Location within the United States
- Location: Lakeland, Polk County, Florida
- Coordinates: 28°3′24″N 81°57′23″W
- Built: 1925
- Architectural style: Mission/Spanish Revival
- NRHP reference No.: 97000458
- Added to NRHP: 23 May 1997; 29 years ago

Henley Field is a historic site in Lakeland, Florida. Built in 1922, it is located at 1125 North Florida Avenue. Clare Henley, for whom the park was named in 1942, encouraged its construction in an effort to persuade a professional baseball team to train there. On May 23, 1997, it was added to the U.S. National Register of Historic Places. Henley Field is located adjacent to Bryant Stadium, a football stadium.

Henley Field was used as the home ballpark of the fictional Class D Tampico Stogies in the 1987 HBO movie Long Gone which starred William Petersen and Virginia Madsen. During the film the stadium was known as Smythe Field.

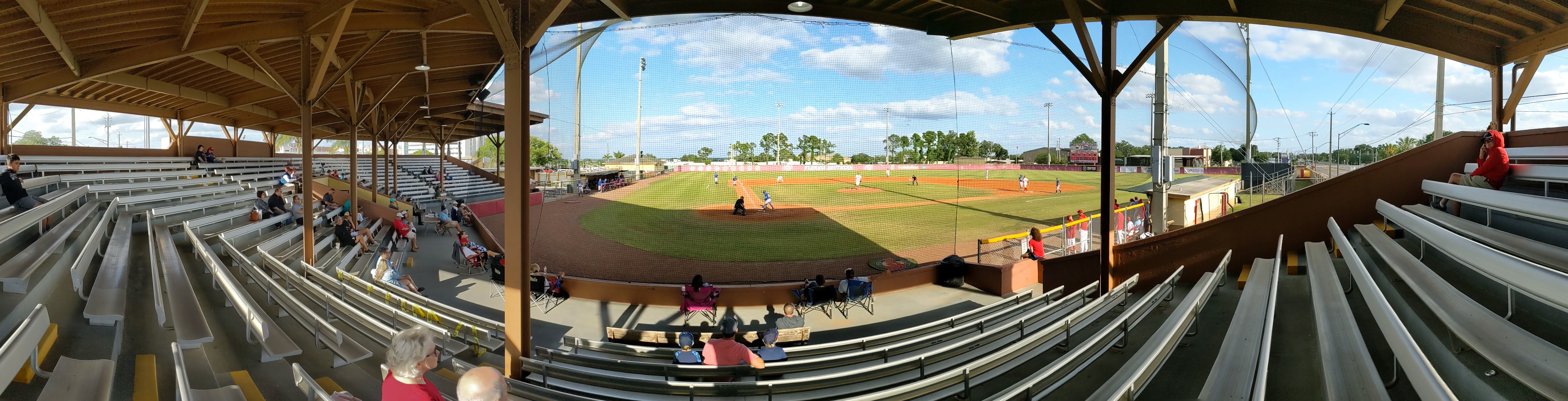
Panorama of Henley Field

The ballpark was renovated prior to the 2002 season at a cost of $250,000. Henley was renovated to enable the Lakeland Tigers to play at the historic ballpark during the 2002 season. while their home field, Joker Marchant Stadium (which is also the current spring training home of the Detroit Tigers), was renovated during the 2002 season.

On September 2, 2015, the City of Lakeland announced it would sell Henley Field for $1 million to United Methodist Church-affiliated Florida Southern College, whose baseball team have used the park for the past 55 years.
