= Alex Carrasquel =

Venezuelan baseball player (1912–1969)

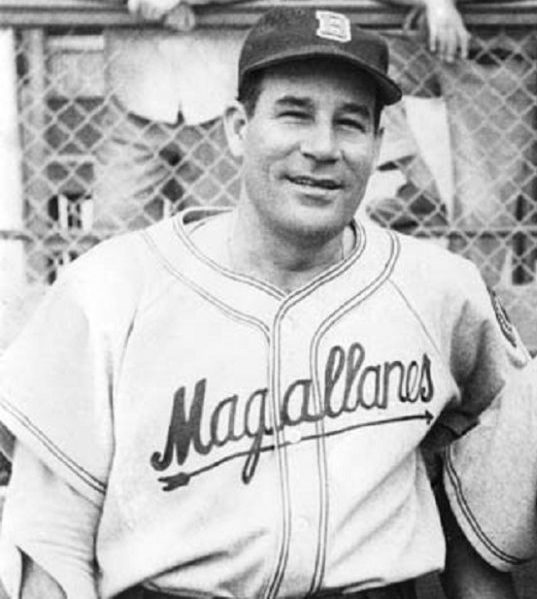
- Pitcher
- Born: July 24, 1912; Caracas, Venezuela
- Died: August 19, 1969 (aged 57); Caracas, Venezuela
- Batted: Right Threw: Right

MLB debut
- April 23, 1939, for the Washington Senators

Last MLB appearance
- July 26, 1949, for the Chicago White Sox

MLB statistics
- Win–loss record: 50-39
- Earned run average: 3.73
- Strikeouts: 252
- Stats at Baseball Reference

Teams
- Washington Senators (1939–1945); Chicago White Sox (1949)

Career highlights and awards
- First Venezuelan ballplayer in Major League Baseball

Member of the Venezuelan

Baseball Hall of Fame
- Induction: 2003

Alejandro Eloy Carrasquel Aparicio (July 24, 1912 – August 19, 1969) was a Venezuelan pitcher in Major League Baseball (MLB) who played for the Washington Senators and the Chicago White Sox over a span of eight seasons from 1939 to 1949. Nicknamed Patón ("Bigfoot") in Venezuela, he was listed at 6 ft 1 in (1.85 m), 182 pounds (83 kg), and batted and threw right handed.

Carrasquel became the first Venezuelan-born player to ever appear in the majors when he joined the Senators in its 1939 season. He is also known as one of the handful of major leaguers who jumped from their organized baseball teams to play in the Mexican League in 1946.

== Baseball career ==
Born in Caracas, Carrasquel had a fine fastball, which he complemented with an effective knuckleball and a decent curve. He started his major league career with the Senators of the American League on April 23, 1939. Carrasquel became the second player to go straight into the major leagues, following Ted Lyons, who did it in 1923.

Carrasquel made his first appearance against the New York Yankees at Griffith Stadium. He relieved starter Ken Chase with two outs in the fourth inning and a runner on first base. The first three batters Carrasquel faced were future Hall of Famers Joe DiMaggio, Lou Gehrig and Bill Dickey. He retired them all, striking out DiMaggio while retiring Gehrig on a ground ball and Dickey on a pop fly. Carrasquel threw 5 1/3 solid innings of relief, surrendering only one run over that span, though the Yankees won, 7–4.

In his second game, on April 30, Carrasquel earned his first save at Yankee Stadium. He was called in to relieve in the eighth inning, with two outs and the bases loaded, and Washington trying to preserve a 3–2 lead. Carrasquel got the third out by retiring Yankees second baseman Joe Gordon, then retired Red Ruffing, Frankie Crosetti and Red Rolfe in order in the ninth to preserve the Senators victory.

A month later, on May 30, Carrasquel hit his only career home run, a solo blast off pitcher Nels Potter in a 3–1 loss to the Philadelphia Athletics, which was the first home run hit by a Venezuelan player in a major league game.

In the 1940s, Carrasquel posted positive win–loss records in six consecutive seasons for lousy Senators teams that usually finished below .500. He had a 6–2 record (.750) in both 1940 and 1941, while the Senators went 64-90 and 70–84, respectively. In 1942 he went 7–7 (.500); Washington, 60–91.

His most productive season came in 1943, when he had a 11–7 record and 3.43 ERA in 39 games (13 starts), including four complete games, one shutout and five saves. His shutout was also a career highlight on April 25, as he pitched a two-hitter, 5–0 victory against the Philadelphia Athletics at Shibe Park. The Senators actually finished over .500 at 84–69.

Three days later, on May 3, Carrasquel made his third relief appearance and picked up his first win as well as the first by a Venezuelan pitcher in Major League Baseball history when the Senators defeated the St. Louis Browns at Sportsman’s Park. Washington rallied from a six-run deficit in the sixth, scoring seven runs over the final three innings of the game, en route to an 11–10 road victory. Carrasquel pitched scoreless eighth and ninth innings to secure the historic win.

Carrasquel made his first big league start on May 14 against the visiting Boston Red Sox at Griffith Stadium. Carrasquel engaged in an 11-inning pitching duel with Lefty Grove and the score tied at 2–2, until the Red Sox chased him with three runs in the top of the 12th, while the Senators’ rally in the bottom of the inning against Grove and two relievers fell one run short, as the Sox prevailed, 5–4. Besides, in the 7th inning Carrasquel recorded the first hit by a Venezuelan player in the major leagues when he singled off Grove. Incidentally, Carrasquel faced a Red Sox starting lineup that had other future Hall of Famers: Joe Cronin, Bobby Doerr, Jimmie Foxx, Ted Williams, and the aforementioned Grove. On August 13, he won a rematch with the Red Sox at Fenway Park, earning his sixth win of the season in a 6–3, complete game effort.

Although World War II was officially over and baseball's finest players were back in their familiar ranks, tranquility no longer had a place in the majors. The new Mexican League, headed by millionaire Jorge Pasquel, had lured a cluster of big leaguers. On January 2, 1946, the Chicago White Sox bought Carrasquel's contract from the Senators. He rejected the deal and fled to play in Mexico, signing a three-year contract – the first shot in the cross-border disputes that would dominate baseball even more than the return of the war veterans. “Pasquel paid me $3,000 cash [bonus], to sign a three-year contract calling for $10,000 a year,” Carrasquel said, in an interview three years later. “I took it, for in addition to the $33,000 I was to receive in Mexico, I also was free to pitch winter baseball”, he added, according to historian Lou Hernandez. There were several other players who fled to Mexico, including outfielder Danny Gardella, pitchers Sal Maglie and Max Lanier and catcher Mickey Owen. As a result, Commissioner of Baseball Happy Chandler sought a lifetime suspension for them, but his penalty was later reduced.

In 1949, Carrasquel returned to the majors and made three appearances for the White Sox before being farmed out. When Chicago acquired his nephew Chico Carrasquel in that season, GM Frank Lane swapped Alex to the Detroit Tigers for Cuban reliever Witto Aloma, who acted strictly as an interpreter for the young Venezuelan shortstop.

== Career statistics ==
In an eight-season major league career, Carrasquel posted a 50–39 record with 252 strikeouts, a 3.73 ERA, 30 complete games, four shutouts, 16 saves, and 861 innings pitched in 258 games (64 as a starter).

== Personal life and death ==
In his native country, Carrasquel was affectionately nicknamed 'Patón' (Bigfoot) due to his shoe size 14. Carrasquel was married to Virginia Johnson. They had two sons, Thomas and William. Carrasquel was hospitalized in Caracas for blood cancer in the summer of 1959, where he died on August 19 due to complications from cancer at age 57.

== See also ==
- List of Major League Baseball players from Venezuela
