= Milt Reed =

American baseball player (1890–1938)

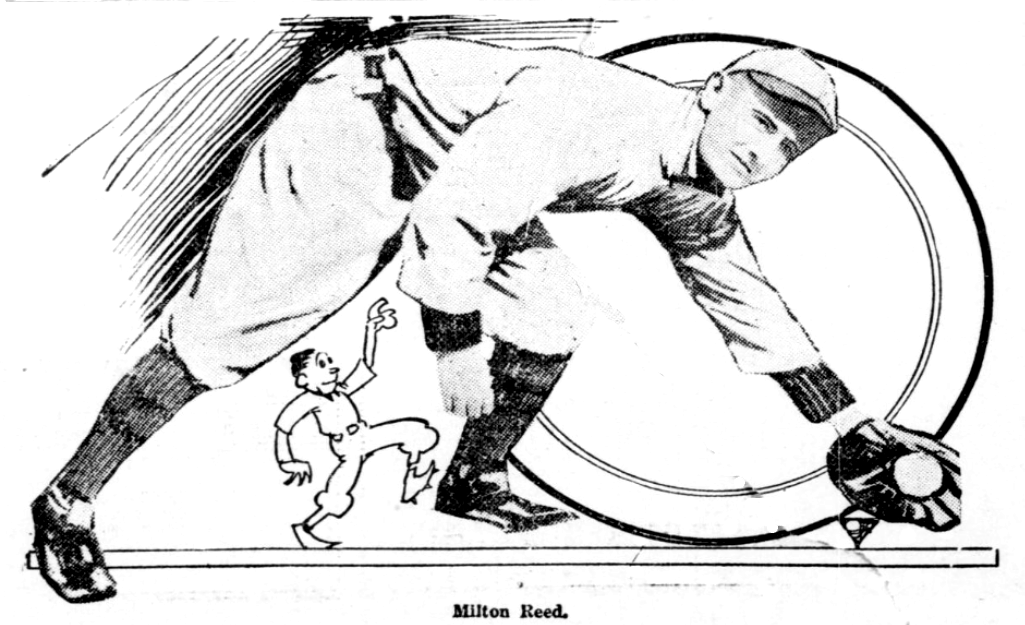
- Shortstop
- Born: July 4, 1890; Atlanta, Georgia, U.S.
- Died: July 27, 1938 (aged 48); Atlanta, Georgia, U.S.
- Batted: Left Threw: Right

MLB debut
- September 19, 1911, for the St. Louis Cardinals

Last MLB appearance
- April 23, 1915, for the Brooklyn Tip-Tops

MLB statistics
- Games played: 68
- At bats: 163
- Hits: 37
- Stats at Baseball Reference

Teams
- St. Louis Cardinals (1911); Philadelphia Phillies (1913–1914); Brooklyn Tip-Tops (1915)

Milton D. Reed (July 4, 1890 in Atlanta, Georgia – July 27, 1938 in Atlanta, Georgia) was an American middle infielder in Major League Baseball from 1911 to 1915. He was later the player/manager for the Lakeland Highlanders in the Florida State League in 1921.

== Sources ==
- Career statistics from Baseball Reference · Baseball Reference (Minors) · Retrosheet · Baseball Almanac
