= Red Corriden =

American baseball player (1887–1959)

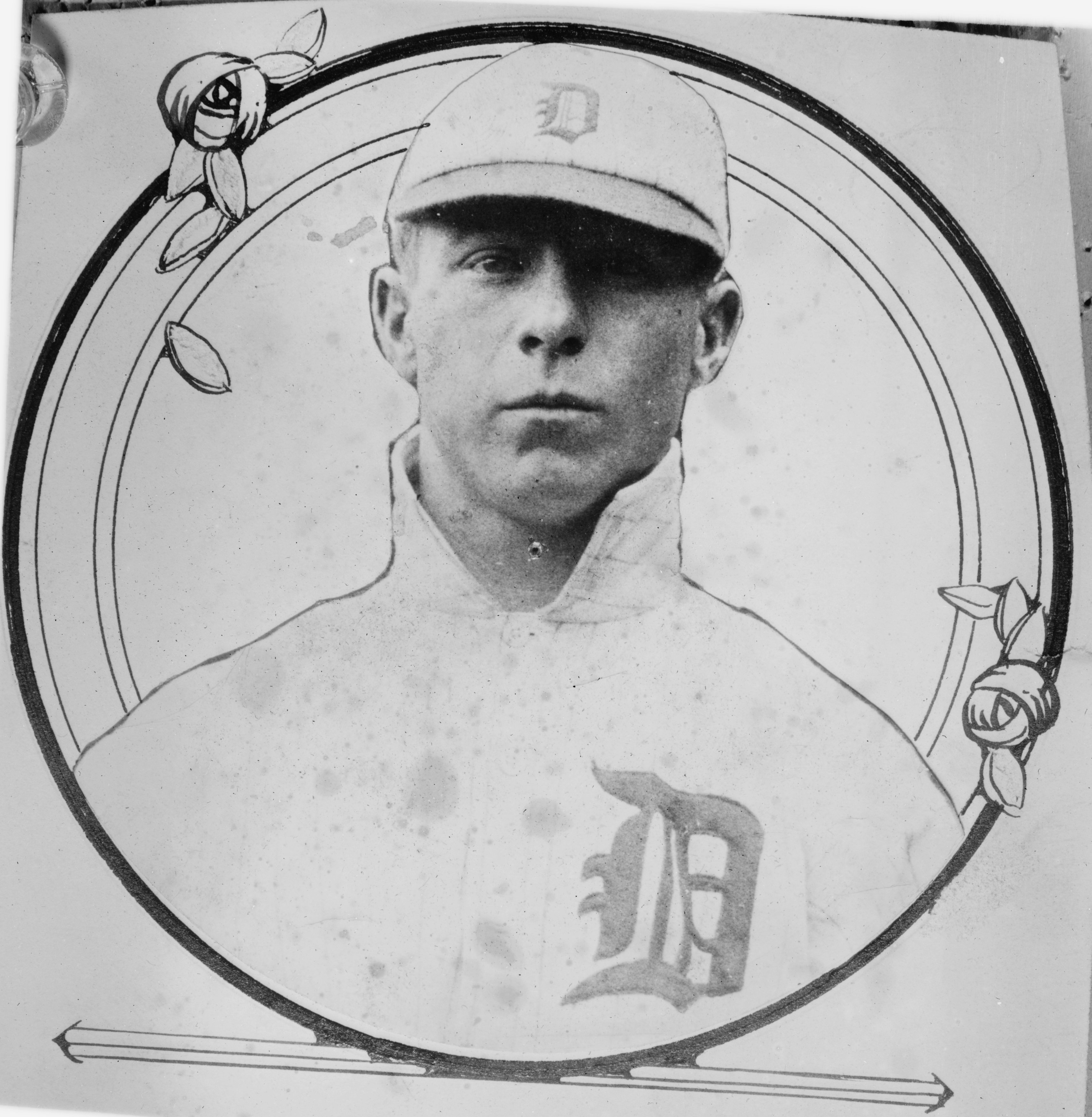
- Shortstop / Third baseman / Manager
- Born: September 4, 1887; Logansport, Indiana, U.S.
- Died: September 28, 1959 (aged 72); Indianapolis, Indiana, U.S.
- Batted: Right Threw: Right

MLB debut
- September 8, 1910, for the St. Louis Browns

Last MLB appearance
- May 15, 1915, for the Chicago Cubs

MLB statistics
- Batting average: .205
- Home runs: 6
- Runs batted in: 47
- Stats at Baseball Reference

Teams
- As player: St. Louis Browns (1910); Detroit Tigers (1912); Chicago Cubs (1913–1915); As coach: Chicago Cubs (1932–1940); Brooklyn Dodgers (1941–1946); New York Yankees (1947–1948); Chicago White Sox (1950); As manager: Chicago White Sox (1950)

Career highlights and awards
- World Series champion (1947)

John Michael "Red" Corriden (September 4, 1887 – September 28, 1959) was an American player, coach, manager, and scout in Major League Baseball. A shortstop and third baseman in his playing days, Corriden appeared in 223 big league games with the St. Louis Browns (1910), Detroit Tigers (1912) and Chicago Cubs (1913–15), batting .205 with 131 hits. He was born in Logansport, Indiana.

== Involvement in 1910 controversy ==
He had an important role in the 1910 Chalmers Award batting title controversy. When playing third base, he was ordered by catcher Jack O'Connor to play back, giving Nap Lajoie a good chance to beat out bunts for hits that could help win the award for Lajoie instead of the widely hated Ty Cobb, who had been leading in the batting average race prior to the last-day's doubleheader, .385 to .376.

== Minor league manager, MLB coach ==
After his playing career ended, Corriden coached and managed in the minor leagues during the 1920s. In 1932 he was named a coach with the Cubs. As a Major League coach for the next 17 years, Corriden would assist managers such as Rogers Hornsby, Charlie Grimm, Gabby Hartnett, Leo Durocher and Bucky Harris with the Cubs (1932–40), Brooklyn Dodgers (1941–46) and New York Yankees (1947–48) — working for five pennant-winning teams and one World Series champion.

The Yankees' "raiding" of Corriden and Chuck Dressen from the coaching staff of Durocher's Dodgers was one of the factors in the public feud between Durocher and Yankee president Larry MacPhail that spilled into print in early 1947. When a newspaper column under Durocher's name accused MacPhail of allowing known gamblers to use his box seats at spring training games in Havana, Cuba, Commissioner of Baseball Happy Chandler initiated an investigation that resulted in Durocher's suspension for the entire 1947 campaign.

== White Sox manager ==
Corriden left the Yankees after the 1948 season. He began 1950 in the familiar role of coach for the Chicago White Sox when his only MLB managing chance occurred. On May 26, 1950, with the Sox only 8–22 and last in the American League, skipper Jack Onslow was dismissed and Corriden, 62 years old at the time, finished out the season. Under Corriden, the White Sox won only 52 of 124 games, but climbed two places, finishing sixth. He returned to the Dodgers in 1951, as a scout. His son, John M. Jr., an outfielder in professional baseball, had a brief big-league trial as a pinch runner with Brooklyn in 1946.

=== Managerial record ===
Team	Year	Regular season					Postseason			
Team	Year	Games	Won	Lost	Win %	Finish	Won	Lost	Win %	Result
CWS	1950	124	52	72	.419	6th in AL	–	–	–	–
Total		124	52	72	.419		0	0	–	

== Death ==
Red Corriden died in Indianapolis, Indiana, at 72 from a heart attack suffered while watching the 1959 National League tie-breaker series between the Milwaukee Braves and the Dodgers on television.
