= Bill Zimmerman (baseball) =

American baseball player (1887-1952)

- Outfielder
- Born: January 20, 1887; Kengen, Germany
- Died: October 4, 1952 (aged 65); Newark, New Jersey, U.S.
- Batted: Right Threw: Right

MLB debut
- April 14, 1915, for the Brooklyn Robins

Last MLB appearance
- July 9, 1915, for the Brooklyn Robins

MLB statistics
- Batting average: .281
- Home runs: 0
- Runs batted in: 7
- Stats at Baseball Reference

Teams
- Brooklyn Robins (1915)

William Frederick Zimmerman (January 20, 1887 – October 4, 1952) was a German born professional baseball player. He was an outfielder in Major League Baseball for the 1915 Brooklyn Robins.
