= Bryant Stadium =

Multi-purpose stadium in Lakeland, Florida

Thomas W. Bryant Stadium
- Interactive map of Thomas W. Bryant Stadium
- Location: 1125 N Florida Avenue; Lakeland, Florida 33805
- Coordinates: 28.058325°N 81.9570463°W
- Owner: Polk County Public Schools
- Surface: Turf

Construction
- Opened: 1941

Tenants
- Lakeland Dreadnaughts (FHSAA) (1941–present); Ajax Orlando Prospects (PDL) (2005, one game); Florida Southern Moccasins (NCAA); Men's lacrosse (2009–2017); Women's lacrosse (2012–2017); Lakeland Tropics (USL2) (2017–2019); Florida Tropics SC (WPSL) (2018–2019)

Thomas W. Bryant Stadium is a multi-purpose stadium in Lakeland, Florida that is currently home to Lakeland High School athletics and the Lakeland Tropics soccer team of USL League Two. It is named for Thomas W. Bryant, a Lakeland native lawyer, legislator, and donor to the University of Florida. Bryant Stadium is just to the north of Henley Field.

In August 2017, Polk County Public Schools purchased Bryant Stadium from the City of Lakeland at a cost of $1.2 million.
