= John Perkovich =

American baseball player (1924–2000)

- Pitcher
- Born: March 10, 1924; Chicago, Illinois, U.S.
- Died: September 16, 2000 (aged 76); Little Rock, Arkansas, U.S.
- Batted: Right Threw: Right

MLB debut
- May 6, 1950, for the Chicago White Sox

Last MLB appearance
- May 6, 1950, for the Chicago White Sox

MLB statistics
- Win–loss record: 0–0
- Earned run average: 7.20
- Strikeouts: 3
- Stats at Baseball Reference

Teams
- Chicago White Sox (1950)

John Joseph "Perky" Perkovich (March 10, 1924 – September 16, 2000) was an American pitcher in Major League Baseball. He played for the Chicago White Sox.
