= Chuck Aleno =

American baseball player (1917–2003)

- Third baseman
- Born: February 19, 1917; St. Louis, Missouri, U.S.
- Died: February 10, 2003 (aged 85); DeLand, Florida, U.S.
- Batted: Right Threw: Right

MLB debut
- May 15, 1941, for the Cincinnati Reds

Last MLB appearance
- September 23, 1944, for the Cincinnati Reds

MLB statistics
- Batting average: .209
- Home runs: 2
- Runs batted in: 34
- Stats at Baseball Reference

Teams
- Cincinnati Reds (1941–1944)

Charles Aleno (February 19, 1917 – February 10, 2003) was a Major League Baseball third baseman. He made his major league debut on May 15, 1941, and played his last major league game on September 23, 1944. He shares the record for the longest hitting streak to start a career with David Dahl (17 games, from May 15 to May 31, 1941, during which he hit .389). After his remarkably hot start, however, Aleno cooled off dramatically, hitting .157 for the rest of his major league career, and finishing with a career average of .209. Aleno played his entire major league career for the Cincinnati Reds.

== Sources ==
- Career statistics from MLB · Baseball Reference · Retrosheet · Baseball Almanac
