= Herb Adams (baseball) =

American baseball player (1928–2012)

- Outfielder
- Born: April 14, 1928; Hollywood, California, U.S.
- Died: February 1, 2012 (aged 83); Tulsa, Oklahoma, U.S.
- Batted: Left Threw: Left

MLB debut
- September 17, 1948, for the Chicago White Sox

Last MLB appearance
- August 30, 1950, for the Chicago White Sox

MLB statistics
- Batting average: .261
- Home runs: 0
- Runs batted in: 18
- Stats at Baseball Reference

Teams
- Chicago White Sox (1948–1950)

Herbert Loren Adams (April 14, 1928 – February 1, 2012) was an American professional baseball outfielder who played three seasons in Major League Baseball for the Chicago White Sox. He was born in Hollywood, California, and later coached at Northern Illinois University.
