= Joe Kirrene =

American baseball player (1931–2016)

- Third baseman
- Born: October 4, 1931; San Francisco, California, U.S.
- Died: October 19, 2016 (aged 85); San Ramon, California, U.S.
- Batted: Right Threw: Right

MLB debut
- October 1, 1950, for the Chicago White Sox

Last MLB appearance
- September 25, 1954, for the Chicago White Sox

MLB statistics
- Batting average: .296
- Home runs: 0
- Runs batted in: 4
- Stats at Baseball Reference

Teams
- Chicago White Sox (1950, 1954)

Joseph John Kirrene (October 4, 1931 – October 19, 2016) was an American professional baseball player. A native of San Francisco, California, a third baseman, appeared in ten Major League games for the Chicago White Sox during late-season trials in 1950 and 1954. Listed at 6 feet 2 inches (1.88 m) tall and 195 pounds (88 kg), he threw and batted right-handed.

Kirrene signed with the White Sox in 1950 and spent his first pro season in the middle levels of minor league baseball before his autumn call-up. On October 1, 1950, the regular season's final day, he started at third base in the second game of a double-header against left-hander Stubby Overmire of the St. Louis Browns. Kirrene had one single in four at bats and was errorless in the field. Kirrene then was out of baseball for three seasons, and served in the military during the Korean War. Returning to the game in 1954, he led the Class A Western League in batting average (.343) and was selected as the third baseman on the league's all-star team.

That September he received his final Major League trial. This time, he appeared in nine games for the ChiSox, six as the starting third baseman, and had three multi-hit games. He drove in four runs and registered his only extra-base hit, a double off Bob Porterfield of the Washington Senators, on September 8, 1954. In 33 total big-league plate appearances, Kirrene had eight hits and five bases on balls, with four runs scored. He also was credited a stolen base. He played in the higher minors—including both teams in his native San Francisco Bay Area—in 1955–56 before leaving pro baseball.

Kirrene died on October 19, 2016. He was interred at Sacramento Valley National Cemetery.
