= Bill Perrin =

American baseball player (1910–1974)

- Pitcher
- Born: June 23, 1923; New Orleans, Louisiana
- Died: June 30, 1974 (aged 51); New Orleans, Louisiana
- Batted: Right Threw: Left

MLB debut
- September 30, 1934, for the Cleveland Indians

Last MLB appearance
- September 30, 1934, for the Cleveland Indians

MLB statistics
- Win–loss record: 0–1
- Earned run average: 14.40
- Strikeouts: 3
- Stats at Baseball Reference

Teams
- Cleveland Indians (1934)

William Joseph "Lefty" Perrin (June 23, 1910 – June 30, 1974) was a Major League Baseball pitcher who played for one season. He played for the Cleveland Indians for one game on September 30 during the 1934 Cleveland Indians season.

He also played for the "New Orleans Pelicans" under well-known Minor League manager Larry Gilbert, and was inducted into the New Orleans–based "Diamond Club Hall of Fame" in 1971. He was a cousin of World Champion boxer Jimmy Perrin.
