= Ken Holcombe =

American baseball player (1918–2010)

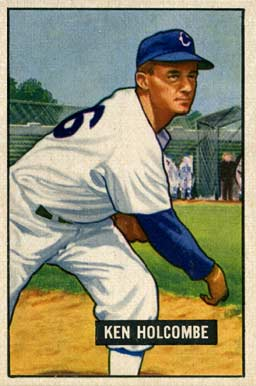
- Pitcher
- Born: August 23, 1918; Burnsville, North Carolina, U.S.
- Died: March 15, 2010 (aged 91); Weaverville, North Carolina, U.S.
- Batted: Right Threw: Right

MLB debut
- April 27, 1945, for the New York Yankees

Last MLB appearance
- May 10, 1953, for the Boston Red Sox

MLB statistics
- Win–loss record: 18–32
- Earned run average: 3.98
- Strikeouts: 118
- Stats at Baseball Reference

Teams
- New York Yankees (1945); Cincinnati Reds (1948); Chicago White Sox (1950–1952); St. Louis Browns (1952); Boston Red Sox (1953)

Kenneth Edward Holcombe (August 23, 1918 – March 15, 2010) was an American Major League Baseball pitcher with the New York Yankees, Cincinnati Reds, Chicago White Sox, St. Louis Browns and Boston Red Sox between 1945 and 1953. Holcombe batted and threw right-handed. He was born in Burnsville, North Carolina.

== Career ==
Holcombe entered the majors in 1945 with the New York Yankees, playing for them one year before joining the Cincinnati Reds (1948), Chicago White Sox (1950–52), St. Louis Browns (1952) and Boston Red Sox (1953). In his rookie season, he showed promise as a solid reliever for the Yankees, going 3–3 with 1.79 ERA and 55⅓ innings in 23 appearances. But he developed a chronic bursitis that eventually ended his career. His most productive season came for the 1951 White Sox, when he won 11 games as a starter, including a 3.78 ERA and 12 complete games –all career-highs. In 12 games for the 1952 Browns, Holcombe was 0–2 with a 3.80 ERA. He wrapped up his major league time by going 1–0 with 1 save for the 1953 Red Sox.

In a six-season career, Holcombe posted an 18–32 record with a 3.98 ERA in 99 appearances, including 48 starts, 18 complete games, two shutouts, 32 games finished, two saves, and 375.0 innings of work.
