= Charlie Cuellar =

American baseball player (1917–1994)

Charlie Cueller
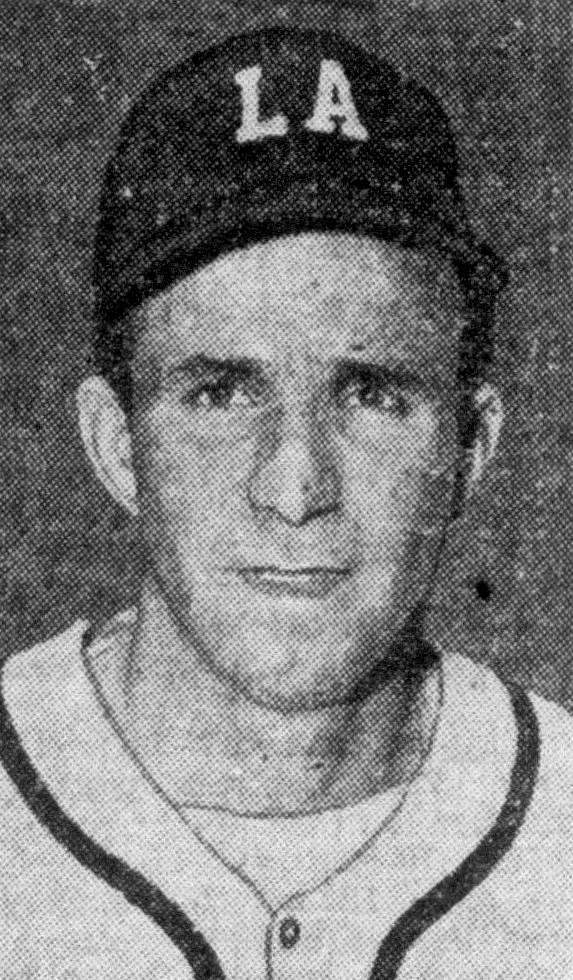
- Cueller, circa 1945
- Pitcher
- Born: September 24, 1917; Ybor City, Florida, U.S.
- Died: October 11, 1994 (aged 77); Tampa, Florida, U.S.
- Batted: Right Threw: Right

MLB debut
- July 2, 1950, for the Chicago White Sox

Last MLB appearance
- July 4, 1950, for the Chicago White Sox

MLB statistics
- Win–loss record: 0–0
- Earned run average: 33.75
- Strikeouts: 1
- Stats at Baseball Reference

Teams
- Chicago White Sox (1950)

Jesus Patracis "Charlie" Cueller (September 24, 1917 – October 11, 1994) was an American pitcher in Major League Baseball. He played for the Chicago White Sox in 1950.
