= Luis Alomá =

Cuban baseball player (1923–1997)

- Pitcher
- Born: June 19, 1923; Havana, Cuba
- Died: April 7, 1997 (aged 73); Park Ridge, Illinois, U.S.
- Batted: Right Threw: Right

MLB debut
- April 19, 1950, for the Chicago White Sox

Last MLB appearance
- August 30, 1953, for the Chicago White Sox

MLB statistics
- Win–loss record: 18–3
- Earned run average: 3.44
- Strikeouts: 115
- Stats at Baseball Reference

Teams
- Chicago White Sox (1950–1953)

Luis Alomá Barba (June 19, 1923 – April 7, 1997), nicknamed "Witto", was a Cuban-born relief pitcher in Major League Baseball who played for the Chicago White Sox from 1950 through 1953. Alomá batted and threw right-handed. He was born in Havana. He would also pitch in farm systems for the Washington Senators and the Detroit Tigers. His first game was on April 19 at the age of 26, and his last game August 30, 1953.

He died in Park Ridge, Illinois, in 1997, although his cemetery is undetermined.

== Professional career ==
=== Washington Senators ===
In 1944 Alomá signed as an amateur free agent with the Washington Senators. In 1944 he split time between the Class D Kingsport Cherokees of the Appalachian League and the Class A-1 Chattanooga Lookouts of the Southern Association. He went a combined 8–7 with a 4.68 ERA in 26 games, eight for starts. He then played the next two seasonswith the Lookouts. In 1945 he went 14–9 with a 3.17 ERA in 31 games, 29 starts, and in 1946 he went 16–11 with a 3.56 ERA in 36 games, 27 for starts.

In 1947 Alomá split the season between the Lookouts and the Class B Charlotte Hornets of the Tri-State League. He had a dismal stint with the Lookouts, going 2–4 with a 6.93 ERA in 15 games. With the Hornets on the other hand he was quite impressive, going 8–7 with a 3.62 ERA in 18 games. He finished a combined 10–11 with a 4.74 ERA in 33 games.

He spent his last year in the Senators' farm system playing for his home town team, Havana Cubans of the Florida International League. In what would turn out to be his best professional season at any level, he went 19–6 with a 1.77 ERA in 28 games.

=== Detroit Tigers ===
In 1949 Alomá was sent by Washington to the Detroit Tigers. He spent the season with the Triple-A Buffalo Bisons of the International League. He compiled a 10–9 record with a 4.60 ERA in 38 games, 22 for start. This would be his only season in the Tigers' system.

=== Chicago White Sox ===
Alomá was again traded, this time on August 5, 1949, from the Tigers to Chicago White Sox in exchange for pitcher Alex Carrasquel. He didn't pitch in the minors for the rest of the 1949 season.

Alomá was 26 years old when he broke into the big leagues on April 19, 1950, with the White Sox. He finished the 1950 season going an impressive 7–2 with a 3.80 ERA in 42 games, all out of the bullpen.

In 1951 Aloma continued his success at the Major League level, going 6–0 with a 1.82 ERA in 25 games. This would prove to be his best season in the Majors. On June 17, he received a spot start due to a packed White Sox schedule (seven games in four days) and shut out the Philadelphia Athletics on five hits. It was the only start of his career, making him one of only four players ever to throw a shutout in their only start in the American or National Leagues.

He was again with Chicago in 1952 going 3–1 with a 4.28 ERA in 25 games. He compiled a career-high six saves in 1952.

His decline continued in 1953, as he was then 28 years of age, while compiling a record of 2–0 with a 4.70 ERA in 24 games. This was his last season pitching at the Major League level.

In 1954, Alomá spent his entire season with the Double-A Memphis Chickasaws of the Southern Association. He went 6–7 with a 4.25 ERA in 31 games, 14 starts for the Chickasaws. This was his last professional season of baseball. In a four-season career, he posted an 18–3 record with a 3.44 ERA and 15 saves in 116 games pitched.
