= Bradenton Marauders =

- Founded in 2010; Bradenton, Florida
Team logo
Cap insignia

Minor league affiliations
- Class: Single-A (2021–present)
- Previous classes: Class A-Advanced (2010–2020)
- League: Florida State League (2010–present)
- Division: West Division

Major league affiliations
- Team: Pittsburgh Pirates (2010–present)

Minor league titles
- League titles (2): 2016; 2021
- Division titles (1): 2016
- First-half titles (1): 2016
- Second-half titles (3): 2010; 2011; 2014
- Wild card berths (1): 2021

Team data
- Name: Bradenton Marauders (2010–present)
- Colors: Black, gold, white
- Ballpark: LECOM Park (2010–present)
- Owner/ Operator: Pittsburgh Pirates
- General manager: Rachelle Madrigal
- Manager: Gera Alvarez
- Media: 1280-AM WTMY
- Website: milb.com/bradenton

The Bradenton Marauders are a Minor League Baseball team of the Florida State League and the Single-A affiliate of the Pittsburgh Pirates. They are located in Bradenton, Florida, and play their home games at LECOM Park, which also serves as the Pirates' spring training facility.

== Previous franchise history ==
The franchise can be directly traced to 1957 as the Tampa Tarpons, a team in the Florida State League, then a Class D minor league, based in Tampa. From their inception, the Tarpons played all their home games at Al Lopez Field, built in 1955 and located at the current site of Raymond James Stadium.

The Tarpons were affiliated with the Philadelphia Phillies from 1957 to 1960. In 1961 they began a long affiliation with the Cincinnati Reds. During the 1970s several Tarpon alumni went on to be part of Cincinnati's "Big Red Machine". Future Reds star Pete Rose led the first place Tarpons in 1961 with a .331 batting average and 30 triples, still an FSL record. Other Reds players of the era who started with the Tarpons include Ken Griffey, Sr., Johnny Bench, Dan Driessen, Rawly Eastwick, and Dave Concepción. Later, the 1990 World Series Champion Reds roster included former Tarpons such as Tom Browning, Rob Dibble, and Paul O'Neill. Randy Poffo, who later became famous as professional wrestler "Macho Man" Randy Savage, finished a minor league baseball career with the Tarpons in 1974. The Tampa Tarpons won three league championships, in 1957, 1959 and 1961.

In the 1980s rumors arose that a major league team would come to Tampa, which would threaten the viability of the Tarpons and other minor league teams in the Tampa Bay Area. In 1988 the Chicago White Sox replaced Cincinnati as the Tarpons' affiliate, launching murmurs that the White Sox would themselves relocate to the area. Fearing his team would soon be displaced, in 1989 Tarpons owner Mitchell Mick sold his franchise to the White Sox, who moved it to Sarasota as the Sarasota White Sox.

The team started play in "Sarasota" as the Sarasota White Sox in the 1989 season. They remained in the city for the next 21 seasons, going through a series of name changes due to their affiliation changes. They were known as the White Sox from 1989 to 1993, as the Sarasota Red Sox from 1994 to 2004, and the Sarasota Reds from 2004 to 2009. In Sarasota, the team played in Payne Park (1989) and then Ed Smith Stadium (1990–2009). They won two division championships, in 1989 and 1992, and made playoff appearances in 1989, 1991, 1992, 1994, and 2007.

== History ==
The Pittsburgh Pirates have had their spring training facilities in Bradenton, Florida, since in 1969, when the city met with Pirates' general manager Joe Brown and owner John W. Galbreath and both sides agreed to a lease of 40 years, with an option for another 40 years.

After the Reds' spring-training departure from Florida's Grapefruit League to Arizona's Cactus League in 2009, the Reds and Pirates did an "affiliate-swap". The Pirates took over the Sarasota Reds, while the Reds became the parent club of the Pirates' former Class A-Advanced affiliate, the Lynchburg Hillcats of the Carolina League. On November 10, 2009, baseball officials voted to allow the Pirates to purchase and uproot the Sarasota Reds. The Pirates moved the team to Bradenton, where they were renamed the Bradenton Marauders. The Marauders became the first Florida State League team located in Bradenton since the Bradenton Growers folded in 1926. The Marauders are also the Pirates' first affiliate in the Florida State League since the Leesburg Pirates ended play in 1948.

=== 2010–2011: Franchise firsts and early success ===
==== Inaugural season ====
On April 8, 2010, the Marauders played their first game in front of 2,396 spectators at McKechnie Field. The inaugural game ended in 18–3 Bradenton victory over the Fort Myers Miracle. Pittsburgh Pirates prospect, Bryan Morris, was the team's starting pitcher. The team's first hit came off its first batter, Greg Picart. Meanwhile, Quincy Latimore registered the team's first home run and run scored. In the fourth inning of the game, Jeremy Farrell registered the team's first grand slam. Calvin Anderson, Eric Fryer, Robbie Grossman, Joel Hanrahan, Starling Marte, and Tony Sanchez also played for the Marauders in their first game.

A few nights later on April 12, 2010, the Marauders completed their first ever four-game series sweep at McKechnie Field. The team capped off their first ever, four-game series sweep with a final score of 6–2 over Fort Myers. The team's first loss came on Thursday April 15, 2010, when they were defeated 3–2 by the Jupiter Hammerheads at Roger Dean Stadium. The Marauders' first home loss came on Saturday April 17, 2010, by a score of 10–7, to the St. Lucie Mets.

On May 16, 2010, Bryan Morris became the very first Marauder to be promoted, when he was called up to the Pirates' Double A affiliate, the Altoona Curve.

The Marauders finished their 2010 inaugural season with a 76–62 record and led the league in runs, batting average, on-base percentage and on-base plus slugging, and they also finished fifth (out of 12 teams) in runs allowed and fourth in ERA. They also finished third in the league in overall winning percentage. The team lost the Southern Division Championship to the Charlotte Stone Crabs 2 games to 1.

In March 2011, Nathan Adcock became the first player from the Marauders to make a major league team's 25-man roster. Adcock was added to the Kansas City Royals roster after he was chosen by the team in the Rule 5 draft.

==== Establishing a fanbase ====
The Marauders play struggled during the first half of the 2011 FSL season. The team finished the first half of the season with a 30–40 record and never really contending for the South Division title. At the start of the season's second half, the Marauders posted a 7–5 record. Two scheduled home games were also moved to Port Charlotte's Sports Park while McKechnie Field's roof underwent construction earlier in the season.

However one of the biggest stories involving the team came in the form of improved attendance. After 40 homes, the Marauders drew 56,718 fans to their home games in 2011, with a game average of 1,418 fans. The team ranks eighth in attendance in the Florida State League. In all of 2010, the team drew 51,856 fans in 70 home dates, only the Dunedin Blue Jays drew fewer fans. According to team officials, the turn-around attendance is believed to be a result of the team having a full season to market itself and establish a fanbase. By the season's end, the team drew a total regular season attendance of 103,978 fans, doubling the previous year's attendance.

On August 18, 2011, Bradenton's Robbie Grossman became the first minor league player to score 100 runs and walk 100 times in a season since Nick Swisher did so in 2004. He is also the first player in the Florida State League to walk 100 times since 1998. Ramon Cabrera was also awarded the Florida State League batting title on September 5 by finishing the 2011 season with a .343 batting average. Three of the FSL's top four hitters were members of the Marauders: Cabrera (1st), Eleyvs Gonzalez (2nd) and Adalberto Santos (4th).

On August 30, 2011, the Marauders defeated the Palm Beach Cardinals, 6–3, to clinch the Florida State League's second half title, for the second time in two years, and playoff berth. However the team would go on to lose the Southern Division Championship, 2 games to 1, for the second straight year.

=== 2012–present ===
The 2012 campaign was the first in which the Marauders failed to make the playoffs. However the year still was memorable for having the Pirates' top prospect in the line-up, Gerrit Cole. It was also the first in which the team used their alternate logo which features two crossed bats behind a skull wearing an eye patch.

Bradenton missed the playoffs again in 2013, however the line-up once again featured the top prospect for the Pittsburgh Pirates, Gregory Polanco. Shortstop Alen Hanson, Polanco, and starting pitcher Nick Kingham represented Bradenton at the 52nd Annual FSL All-Star Game. Jeff Locke also became the first Marauders player to make the roster for the Major League Baseball All-Star Game.

==== 'Million Dollar' recognition and an all-star season ====
In 2014 the journey of current Marauders' player Rinku Singh from India to professional baseball was portrayed in the movie Million Dollar Arm. The film starred Jon Hamm and was produced by Walt Disney Pictures. The Marauders recognized Singh with a commemorative bobblehead that was given away at the gates to the first 1,000 fans on Saturday, May 17 against Dunedin.

The club's 2014 roster consisted of three of the Pirates top 20 prospects, as comprised by MLB.com: pitcher Tyler Glasnow, outfielder Josh Bell and catcher Jin De-Jhang. The club also hosted the 2014 Florida State League All-Star Game on Saturday, June 14 at McKechnie Field. The Marauders were represented in the game by outfielder Josh Bell and left-handed pitcher Orlando Castro. The Marauders returned to the playoffs in 2014 by clinching Second Half South Division Championship for the third time in five years. However the team was eliminated by Fort Myers in the first round. Still the club won, a franchise-best, 78 games in the regular season and swept the Florida State League Pitcher of the Year (Tyler Glasnow), and the Player of the Year (Josh Bell) awards.

==== First championship season ====
Despite a late season surge, the 2015 Marauders were eliminated from playoff contention with a 4–1 loss to the St. Lucie Mets on September 4. However the following season proved much better for the Marauders. On June 20, 2016, the Marauders’ clinched a first-half division title for the first time in franchise history. On September 7, 2016, the Marauders defeated the St. Lucie Mets with a 4–1 win in Game 2 of the FSL South Division Series at McKechnie Field. The win advanced the Marauders to the Florida State League Championship Series for the first time in franchise history. A week later on September 12, 2016, the Marauders defeated the Tampa Yankees, 3 games to 1, at McKechnie Field to win their first Florida State League title.

==== 2021 MiLB restructuring ====
In conjunction with Major League Baseball's restructuring of Minor League Baseball in 2021, the Marauders were organized into the Low-A Southeast at the Low-A classification. In 2022, the Low-A Southeast became known as the Florida State League, the name historically used by the regional circuit prior to the 2021 reorganization, and was reclassified as a Single-A circuit.

== Logos and uniforms ==
The Pirates do not call the club the Bradenton Pirates, which has been used in the past by the Gulf Coast League Pirates, the team was given an original name and logo. According to Pittsburgh Pirates President Frank Coonelly; the Marauders' uniforms are closely associated with the Pirates brand, but also allows for the team to have its own unique identity. The Marauders uniforms incorporate the Marauders logo and letter script, while the colors mirror the Pirates' black and gold colors. White uniforms are worn for games played at McKechnie Field. These white uniforms feature the "Marauders" team name across the chest of the sleeved jersey, as well as the Marauders logo on the cap. During the Marauders 2010 inaugural season, the home jerseys also featured a commemorative patch on the sleeve. Gray uniforms are worn for Marauders road games. These gray uniforms feature the name "Bradenton" across the chest of the sleeved jersey and a styled "B" logo on the cap. Meanwhile, batting practice jerseys are worn during home and road batting practice, as well as during select games throughout the year. These jersey are black and feature the Marauders logo on the left chest, along with yellow and red accents along the sides.

The Marauders also have an alternate gold cap with a black bill and the uniquely styled "B" logo on the cap representing the City of Bradenton. The gold cap is reminiscent of the one worn by the Pirates of the early 1970s. A second alternate black cap with the styled "B" logo is also in use. In December 2011, the team unveiled an alternate logo, that is used for select games, for use on their caps during the 2012 season. The logo features a pair of crossed bats and a smiling skull with a patch over its right eye.

On May 31, 2012, the Marauders dressed in Bradenton Growers' uniforms during a 2–1 win over the Fort Myers Miracle for Turn Back the Clock Night at McKechnie Field. The team took the opportunity to honor the Growers, who last played in 1926 and were the last Florida State League team to be based in Bradenton prior to the Marauders' arrival in 2010.

== Roster ==
Bradenton Marauders roster
Players	Coaches/Other
Pitchers: 24 Gavin Adams; 49 Kyle Calzadiaz; 30 Felix Doroteo; 26 Michael Gibson; 16 Nathan Helman; 15 Wifrailyn Jaquez; 41 Rohan Lettow; 46 Dioris Martinez; 12 Jeter Martinez; 34 Dylan Mathiesen; 31 David Matoma; 54 Bryson Moore; 29 Zander Mueth; 51 Alex Overbay; 45 Irwin Ramirez; 25 Yeraldo Salcedo; 77 Dakota Stone; 54 Victor Trejo; Catchers: 6 Jack Scanlon; Infielders: 38 Kendrick Herrera; 28 Francisco Loreto; 3 Raymond Mola; 2 Tre Phelps; 32 Antonio Pimentel; 7 Chris Rembert; 27 Luke Scherrer; Outfielders: 13 Bralyn Brazoban; 17 Carl Calixte; 43 Cristian Jauregui; 5 Canon Reeder	Manager: 18 Gera Alvarez; Coaches: 5 Quentin Brown (hitting); 41 Matt Ford (pitching); 14 Jose Mendez (bench); 44 Gustavo Omana (catching); 23 Ryan Powers (hitting); 52 Jonathan Prieto (hitting); 60-day injured list: -- Jaiker Garcia; -- Carlos Mateo; 86 Edgleen Perez; -- Pitterson Rosa (full season); -- Eddie Rynders; -- Clevari Tejada (full season); -- Jesus Travieso; 7-day injured list; * On Pittsburgh Pirates 40-man roster; ~ Development list; # Rehab assignment; ∞ Reserve list; ‡ Restricted list; § Suspended list; † Temporarily inactive list; Roster updated September 12, 2026; Transactions; → More rosters: MiLB • Florida State League; → Pittsburgh Pirates minor league players

== Marauders Award winners ==
MiLBY Awards

- Mitch Keller (2016: Breakout Prospect)

Florida State League Hall of Fame

- Evan Chambers (2017)

**Florida State League Player of the Year**

- Alex Dickerson (2012)
- Josh Bell (2014)

**Florida State League Pitcher of the Year**

- Tyler Glasnow (2014)

Florida State League All-Star Game selections
The following players were named to the Florida State All-Star team in each particular season. A name in Bold indicates the player later participated in the MLB All-Star Game. A cross (†) indicates the player was named FSL All-Star Game MVP.

**2010**

- Nate Adcock (RHP)
- Jeremy Farrell (3B)
- **Brock Holt** (INF)
- Noah Krol (RHP)
- Quincy Latimore (OF)
- **Jeff Locke** (LHP)
- Bryan Morris (RHP)
- Tony Sanchez (C)

**2011**

- Aaron Baker (1B)†
- Jarek Cunningham (INF)
- Ramón Cabrera (C)
- Brett Lorin (RHP)
- Kyle McPherson (LHP)

**2012**

- **Gerrit Cole** (RHP)
- Jameson Taillon (RHP)
- Stefan Welch (1B/3B)

**2013**

- Alen Hanson (SS)†
- Nick Kingham (RHP)
- Gregory Polanco (OF)

**2014**

- **Josh Bell** (OF)
- Orlando Castro (LHP)

**2015**

- Jin-De Jhang (C)
- JaCoby Jones (SS)
- Reese McGuire (C)
- **Austin Meadows** (OF)
- José Osuna (1B)

**2016**

- Taylor Gushue (C)
- Luis Heredia (RHP)
- Connor Joe (3B)
- Kevin Newman (SS)

**2017**

- Darío Agrazal (RHP)
- Jake Brentz (LHP)
- Logan Hill (OF)
- Casey Hughston (OF)
- **Mitch Keller (RHP)**
- Christian Kelley (C)
- Seth McGarry (RHP)
- Yunior Montero (RHP)
- Cole Tucker (SS)

**2018**

- Matt Eckelman (RHP)
- Alfredo Reyes (2B)
- Eduardo Vera (RHP)

== Season-by-season record ==
=== Florida State League (2010-2020) ===
League champions †	Finals appearance *	Division winner ^	Wild card berth ¤

Year	League	Division	Regular season										Postseason
Year	League	Division	1st half					2nd half					Postseason
Year	League	Division	Finish	Wins	Losses	Win%	GB	Finish	Wins	Losses	Win%	GB	Postseason
2010	FSL	South	2nd	39	31	.557	4.5	1st ^	37	31	.544	–	Lost semifinals (Charlotte) 1–2
2011	FSL	South	5th	30	40	.429	8	1st ^	44	23	.657	–	Lost semifinals (St. Lucie) 1–2
2012	FSL	South	6th	29	41	.414	21	5th	31	36	.463	7.5	
2013	FSL	South	6th	26	42	.382	19.5	5th	31	35	.470	7.5	
2014	FSL	South	4th	35	34	.507	6	1st ^	43	27	.614	–	Lost semifinals (Fort Myers) 0–2
2015	FSL	South	5th	32	38	.457	13	2nd	42	26	.618	1	
2016	FSL	South	1st ^	38	30	.559	–	4th	32	36	.471	7	Won semifinals (St. Lucie) 2–0; Won finals (Tampa) 3–1 †
2017	FSL	South	2nd	37	30	.552	3	3rd	33	32	.508	8	
2018	FSL	South	3rd	35	30	.538	4.5	6th	21	44	.323	17	
2019	FSL	South	3rd	36	30	.545	3	2nd	37	32	.536	10	Postseason canceled due to Hurricane Dorian
2020	Season cancelled due to the COVID-19 pandemic.												

=== Low-A Southeast (2021) ===
Year	League	Division	Regular season^{[a]}					Postseason
Year	League	Division	Finish	Wins	Losses	Win%	GB	Postseason
2021	Low-A Southeast	West	2nd	71	48	.597	3.5	Won finals (Tampa) 3-0

- ^{a} Playoffs were determined by the top two teams with the best full-season winning percentage, regardless of division.

=== Florida State League (2022-present) ===
Year	League	Division	Regular season										Postseason
Year	League	Division	1st half					2nd half					Postseason
Year	League	Division	Finish	Wins	Losses	Win%	GB	Finish	Wins	Losses	Win%	GB	Postseason
2022	FSL	West	4th	29	36	.446	12.5	2nd	38	26	.594	0.5	
2023	FSL	West	2nd	35	30	.538	9	2nd	41	24	.631	2.5	
2024	FSL	West	5th	29	37	.439	14.0	5th	25	40	.385	13.0	
2025	FSL	West	5th	30	36	.455	9.0	3rd	30	33	.476	6.5	

=== All-time records ===
Statistic	Wins	Losses	Win %
Regular season record (2010–2023)	1016	978	.510
Postseason record (2010–2023)	10	7	.588
All-time regular and postseason record	1026	985	.510

== Notable alumni ==
- Former Marauders players

== See also ==
- Baseball in the Tampa Bay area
