= Al Lopez Field =

Former baseball stadium in Tampa, Florida

Al López Field
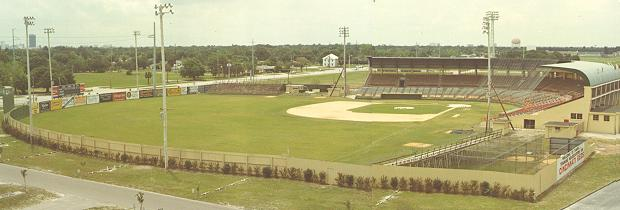

- Location in Florida Location in the United States
- Location: Tampa, Florida
- Owner: Tampa Sports Authority
- Operator: Tampa Sports Authority
- Capacity: approximately 5,000
- Surface: Grass
- Field size: Left - 340 ft. Center - 400 ft. Right - 340 ft.

Construction
- Groundbreaking: 1954
- Opened: March 1955
- Closed: 1988
- Demolished: Spring 1989
- Cost: "$287,901 (equivalent to $3,460,177 in 2025)"

Tenants
- MLB Spring Training; Chicago White Sox (1955–1959); Cincinnati Reds (1960–1987); Minor Leagues; Tampa Tarpons (FSL) (1957–1988); College; USF Bulls (NCAA) (1966)

Al López Field was a spring training and Minor League baseball ballpark in West Tampa, Tampa, Florida, United States. It was named for Al López, the first Tampa native to play Major League Baseball (MLB), manage an MLB team, and be enshrined in the Baseball Hall of Fame. Al López Field was built in 1954 and hosted its first spring training in 1955, when the Chicago White Sox moved their training site to Tampa from California. Al López became the White Sox's manager in 1957, and for the next three springs, he was the home manager in a ballpark named after himself. The Cincinnati Reds replaced the White Sox as Al López Field's primary tenant in 1960 and would return every spring for almost 30 years. The Tampa Tarpons, the Reds' Class-A minor league affiliate in the Florida State League, played at the ballpark every summer from 1961–1987, and many members of the Reds' Big Red Machine teams of the 1970s played there early in their professional baseball careers.

Al López Field was constructed as the first phase part of a planned community sports complex, with Tampa Stadium built adjacent to the ballpark in 1967. When the Tampa Bay area began seriously pursuing a Major League Baseball expansion team in the 1980s, the site of Al López Field was widely regarded as a prime location for a potential major league ballpark. With the city of Tampa unwilling to offer a new long-term lease due to the facility's uncertain future, the Reds decided to move their spring training home to nearby Plant City in 1988. The Tarpons moved to Sarasota a year later, leaving Al López Field without a tenant.

The ballpark was razed in 1989 to facilitate faster construction of a major league replacement. However, MLB chose St. Petersburg's Tropicana Field as the home for the expansion Tampa Bay Devil Rays, leaving the site vacant and Tampa without a professional baseball team. Legends Field opened nearby in 1995 as the new spring training home of the New York Yankees and summer home of the minor league Tampa Yankees. In 1998, Raymond James Stadium, a replacement for Tampa Stadium, was built at the former location of Al López Field.

== Pre-history and design ==
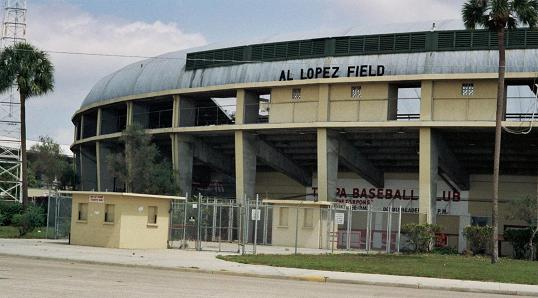
Entrance to Al López Field shortly before its demolition in 1989

Tampa was one of the first spring training locations in Florida. Beginning with the Chicago Cubs in 1913, a series of major league teams trained at Plant Field, a multipurpose facility near downtown Tampa. Plant Field was also the home ballpark of the minor league Tampa Smokers, who were a charter member of the Florida State League. While the Cincinnati Reds were still training at Plant Field into the 1950s, the facility was old (it was built in 1898) and had to be shared among many different teams and events. City leaders decided that a new baseball-only facility would insure that Tampa could continue to host spring training and professional baseball into the future.

In 1949, the city of Tampa bought 720 acres (2.9 km^{2}) of open land near West Tampa from the federal government. The large, grassy parcel had once been the perimeter of Drew Field, a World War II-era airfield which was the precursor to Tampa International Airport, and was purchased with the idea of building a large community sports complex. The construction of Al López Field in 1954 was the first phase of this project. It was located east of Dale Mabry Highway (US Highway 92) and north of Tampa Bay Boulevard, near the center of the land parcel purchased in 1949. Tampa Stadium, a much larger football stadium, was constructed beyond the baseball park's left field wall in 1967.

Much like the original Tampa Stadium, the design of Al López Field was functional and minimalist. The grandstand was primarily constructed from concrete and featured a high, curved aluminum overhang with no obstructing columns, a design similar to that of Miami Stadium.

== Sporting history ==
Construction on Al López Field was not quite complete on October 6, 1954, when it was officially dedicated as part of "Al López Day" in Tampa. It was, however, ready for spring training in March 1954, when the Chicago White Sox used the place as a training base while playing exhibition games at Plant Field. From 1957-1959, after the White Sox went north for the beginning of the regular season, their new Florida State League Class-A team, the Tampa Tarpons, took the field. Al López became the White Sox manager in 1957, putting him in the unusual position of managing in his hometown in a stadium that bore his name. During one ballgame, Lopez got into an argument with umpire John Stevens and was ejected. As Lopez said later, "The umpire threw me out of my own ballpark!"

The White Sox moved their spring training home to Payne Park in Sarasota, Florida in 1960, and the Cincinnati Reds (who had continued to train at Plant Field) moved their spring operations across town to become Al López Field's new tenants. The Reds would become the major league club most associated with the ballpark, as they used the stadium and the adjacent training facilities (nicknamed "Redsland") as their spring home for almost 30 years. As part of the agreement, the Tampa Tarpons became the Reds' Florida State League affiliate in 1960 and would remain in their minor league system until 1987. Consequently, several members of Cincinnati's championship-winning "Big Red Machine" of the 1970s, including Pete Rose. Johnny Bench, and Dave Concepción, played some of their first professional baseball in Tampa with the Tarpons and later returned for spring training with the big league club.

Al Lopez Field was the one of several host venues for the 1974 Amateur World Series, the first and only edition of the tournament (later renamed the Baseball World Cup) to be held in the United States.

The Reds hosted the New York Yankees at the park on March 17, 1978. In honor of Saint Patrick's Day, Reds general manager Dick Wagner had green versions of the Reds' uniforms made. This was the first time a major league team wore green trimmed uniforms on March 17, a practice adopted in subsequent years by multiple major league teams for Spring Training games that fall on St. Patrick's Day.

The South Florida Bulls baseball team played at Al López Field during their inaugural season in 1966, but moved to the on-campus Red McEwen Field the following year.

Besides professional baseball, Al López Field regularly hosted amateur and semi-pro baseball games, including many Florida high school baseball championships, and occasionally hosted boxing and wrestling matches.

== Other events ==
Al López Field was the site of several large civic events, particularly before Curtis Hixon Hall was built downtown in 1965. During a visit to Tampa in November 1963, President John F. Kennedy delivered his last major speech to an overflow crowd of 10,000 people at the ballpark only days before being assassinated in Dallas, Texas.

== Closing and aftermath ==
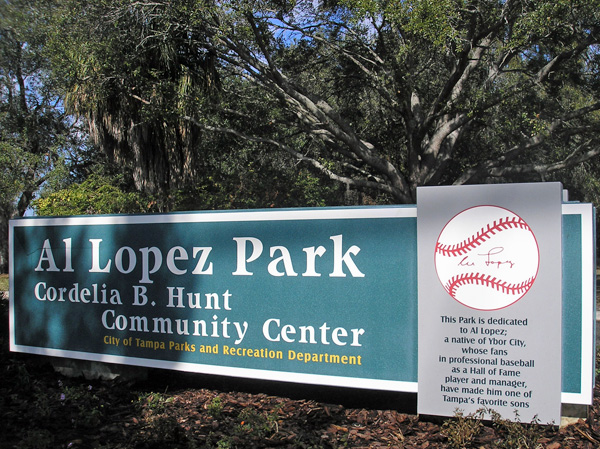
Entrance to Al López Park

By the 1980s, the Tampa Bay area was widely discussed as a possible home for either a major league expansion team or a relocated existing team, and the site of Al López Field was considered a prime location for a new major league ballpark if Tampa received a team. With the uncertainty about the future of the site, the Tampa Sports Authority would only offer the Reds a series of short-term leases for the continued use of the ballpark and the adjacent training facilities. The team responded by building a new facility in nearby Plant City, Florida. The 1987 season was the last in which the Cincinnati Reds held spring training in Tampa and the Tampa Tarpons were a Reds minor league affiliate.

The Tampa Tarpons reached an affiliation agreement with the Chicago White Sox for the 1988 season. However, various local groups continued to pursue a major league team and announced various plans for large stadiums at the Al López Field site, leading the Tarpons' local owners to sell the minor league team to the White Sox in November 1988. The Tarpons moved to Sarasota in 1989 and were rechristened the Sarasota White Sox, leaving Tampa without professional baseball for the first time in over 70 years.

With no tenants and with a sense that the city would have to move quickly to build a major league stadium, the Tampa Sports Authority decided to demolish AL Lopez Field in early 1989. Al López himself had retired to Tampa and lived only a few miles from the ballpark that bore his name. In a 1992 interview, Lopez said that the razing of the stadium "wasn't very disappointing. I saw a diagram of the new stadium, and I didn't feel bad because I thought they were going to build a bigger one and a better one. After that, something happened, and they never built the ballpark. Then it was a disappointment." Horizon Park, a public park just north of Tampa Stadium, was renamed Al López Park in his honor in 1992.

While Tampa waited to build a new ballpark until it was guaranteed a major league team, St. Petersburg went ahead with construction on the domed stadium that is now known as Tropicana Field. It was completed in 1990, and St. Pete was awarded the expansion Tampa Bay (Devil) Rays in 1995. Meanwhile, Tampa resumed its long affiliation with professional baseball in 1994, when the New York Yankees agreed to move their spring training home and Florida State League affiliate (the Tampa Yankees) to Tampa if the city built a new ballpark for their use. The city built George M. Steinbrenner Field (originally known as Legends Field) across Dale Mabry Highway from Tampa Stadium, about a quarter mile northwest of the former site of Al López Field. The city of Tampa also upgraded the nearby training facilities formerly known as Redsland for use by the Yankees.

The former site of Al López Field was a parking area for Tampa Stadium until 1998, when Raymond James Stadium was built on its footprint.
