= LECOM Park =

Baseball field in Bradenton, Florida

- McKechnie Field
- Interactive map of LECOM Park
- Former names: McKechnie Field (1962–2017); Braves Field (1948–1961); Ninth Street Park (1927–1947); City Park (1923–1926)
- Location: 1611 9th Street West; Bradenton, FL 34205
- Coordinates: 27°29′9″N 82°34′13″W
- Owner: City of Bradenton
- Operator: City of Bradenton; Pittsburgh Pirates
- Capacity: 2,000 (1923); 6,602 (1993); 8,500 (2013)
- Surface: Grass
- Field size: Left Field — 335 ft Left-Center — 375ft Center Field — 400 ft Right-Center — 375 ft Right Field — 335 ft

Construction
- Opened: 1923
- Renovated: 1993; 2013
- Cost: US$2,000 (initial) ($37,793 in 2025 dollars); US$30 million (to date)
- Architects: L.D. Astorino Companies, Pittsburgh, Pennsylvania (1993 Renovation); Fawley Bryant Architects, Bradenton, Florida (2008, 2012 Renovation)
- Main contractor: N.D.C. Construction Co. Inc. (2012 Renovation)

Tenants
- Pittsburgh Pirates (NL) (1969–present); Bradenton Marauders (FSL) (2010–present); Bradenton Explorers (SPBA) (1989–1990); Kansas City/Oakland Athletics (AL) (1963–1968); Boston / Milwaukee Braves (NL) (1948–1962); Boston Bees (NL) (1938–1940); St. Louis Cardinals (NL) (1930–1936); Boston Red Sox (AL) (1928–1929); Philadelphia Phillies (NL) (1925–1927); St. Louis Cardinals (NL) (1923–1924); Bradenton Growers (FSL) (1923–1924, 1926)

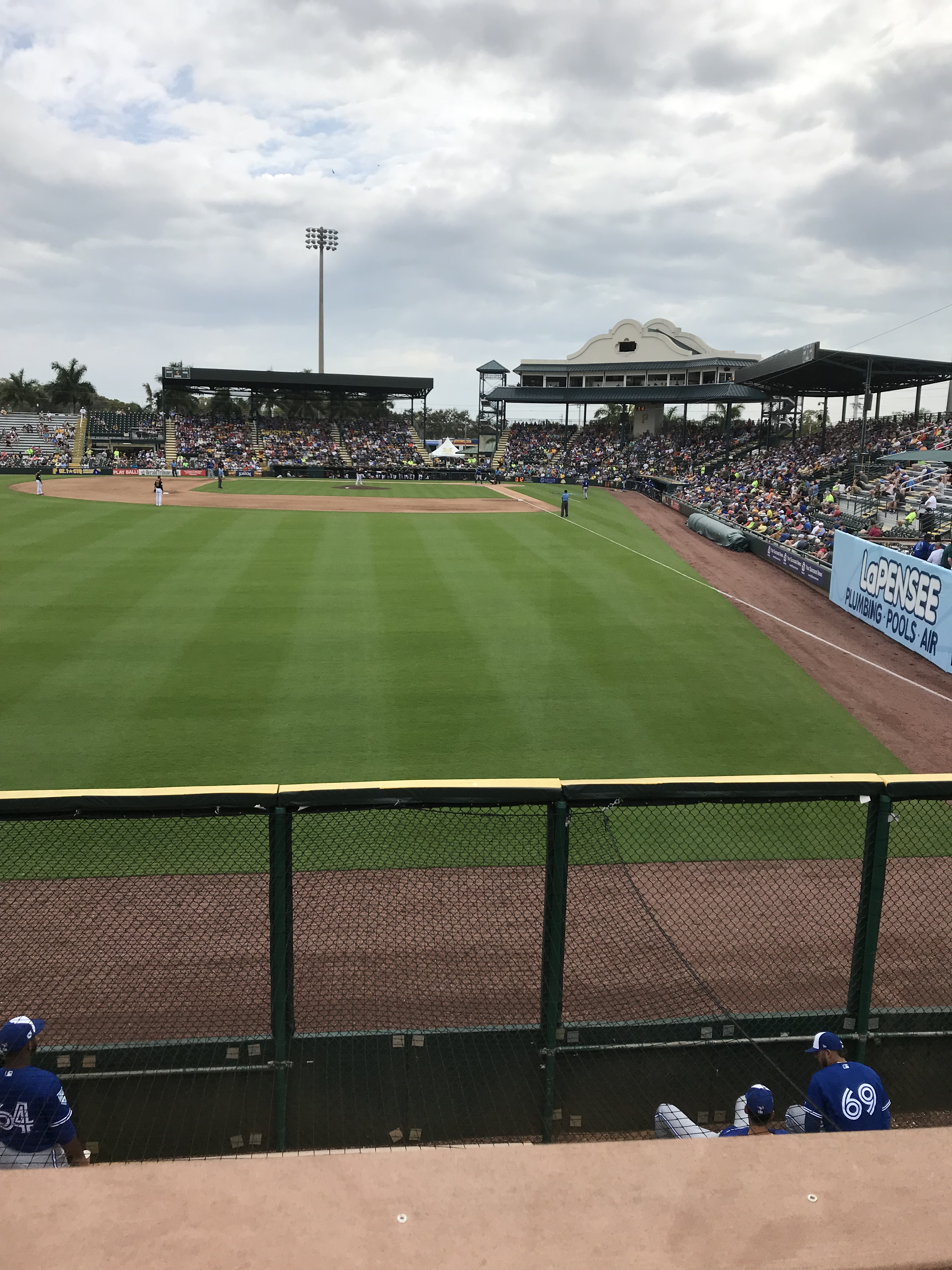
Spring Training 2019 at LECOM Park

LECOM Park is a baseball field located in Bradenton, Florida. It is the spring training home of the Pittsburgh Pirates and is named after a 15-year naming rights deal was signed with the Lake Erie College of Osteopathic Medicine, which has its main campus in Erie, Pennsylvania, and also a campus in Bradenton. It was formerly known as McKechnie Field, named for Bradenton resident and Baseball Hall of Fame great Bill McKechnie, who led the Pirates in 1925 and the Cincinnati Reds in 1940 to World Series titles. He was also a coach with the Cleveland Indians in 1948.

Several members of the Baseball Hall of Fame, such as Roberto Alomar, Johnny Bench, Bert Blyleven, Wade Boggs, Roberto Clemente, Andre Dawson, Vladimir Guerrero, Roy Halladay, Reggie Jackson, Fred McGriff, Bill Mazeroski, Joe Morgan, Jack Morris, Phil Niekro, David Ortiz, Mike Piazza, Tim Raines, Cal Ripken Jr., Mariano Rivera, Ivan Rodriguez, Babe Ruth, Mike Schmidt, Tom Seaver, Willie Stargell, Alan Trammell, Larry Walker, Ted Williams, and Dave Winfield have played at LECOM Park.

The stadium also hosts Minor League Baseball games for the Bradenton Marauders, the Pirates' Single-A affiliate in the Florida State League.

LECOM Park's nostalgic charms in its city neighborhood appeal to many baseball traditionalists and ballpark enthusiasts, some of whom consider the facility to be Florida's version of Fenway Park. It is built in a Florida Spanish Mission style, with white stucco on the main grandstand and covered bleachers over the reserved seating section. The Pirates and the City of Bradenton celebrated their 50th anniversary together during the 2018 spring training season, which included an agreement between the city and the Pirates to continue their partnership through 2037.

Built in 1923, it is the oldest stadium still used for spring training. As of the 2023 season, it is the second-oldest stadium in Minor League Baseball, behind only Jackie Robinson Ballpark in Daytona Beach, which dates to 1914. It is also the third oldest stadium currently used by a major league team after Fenway Park, built in 1912, and Wrigley Field, built in 1914.

The stadium hosted an annual charity game between the Pirates and the State College of Florida, Manatee–Sarasota.

Several improvements to the field were made possible through the efforts of the Bradenton Boosters, a volunteer club of local residents that not only raises funds for ballpark improvements, but also operate LECOM Park on game day. Since 1979, members of the Boosters have volunteered as the Pirates spring training game-day staff. The booster club's 120 members currently serve as ushers, program sellers, security personnel, merchandise sellers, and press box attendants throughout spring training season.

== History ==
=== Early era: 1919–1941 ===
==== The Cardinals' first term ====
Prior to its construction, the stadium's location was the site of Ninth Street Park, which was used by the Bradenton Growers of the Florida State League. The site was also the home to the Manatee County fairgrounds as well as a local nine-hole golf course.

On December 9, 1920, the Manatee County Board of Trade voted to bring major league baseball to the county in an attempt to stimulate the local economy. Prior to the 1920s, no major league team played south of St. Petersburg. However, Robert M. Beall Sr., the founder of the Bradenton-based department store, Bealls, as well as the team president and majority owner of the Bradenton Growers, was connected to Sam Breadon, the owner of the St. Louis Cardinals. Breadon also owned a citrus grove inside the county and was familiar with the area. Beall convinced Breadon to move the Cardinals from their training facility in Orange, Texas to Bradenton. As part of the agreement, Beall agreed to sell $2,000 in tickets for the exhibition games. In a joint venture between the Cardinals and the city, the ball field was constructed with a grandstand and bleachers for $2,000. The baseball field was just east of where LECOM Park stands today, on the site of the Bradenton Golf Club, a nine-hole golf course. After completion, city engineers discovered that the field's second base, was 14 inches (36 cm) lower than home plate, and the outfield was even 2 feet (0.61 m) lower than second base.

However, the park opened in 1923. The Commissioner of Baseball, Kenesaw Mountain Landis, attended the field's opening ceremonies. He was flown in on a biplane, which was piloted by Harry Land, a member of Manatee County Board of Trade who approved bringing major league baseball to Bradenton. The plane landed in what was the outfield at the time, a par 5 hole. In 1923, the grandstand sat 1,300 and 700 could easily occupy the bleachers, which included separate facilities for segregated African-American fans. Meanwhile, the fairground buildings were converted into makeshift locker rooms.

==== The Growers era ====
The Bradenton Growers occupied LECOM Park, which was then named City Park, from 1923 to 1924 and again in 1926. The field was later renamed Ninth Street Park and then Braves Field.

==== Phillies and Red Sox ====
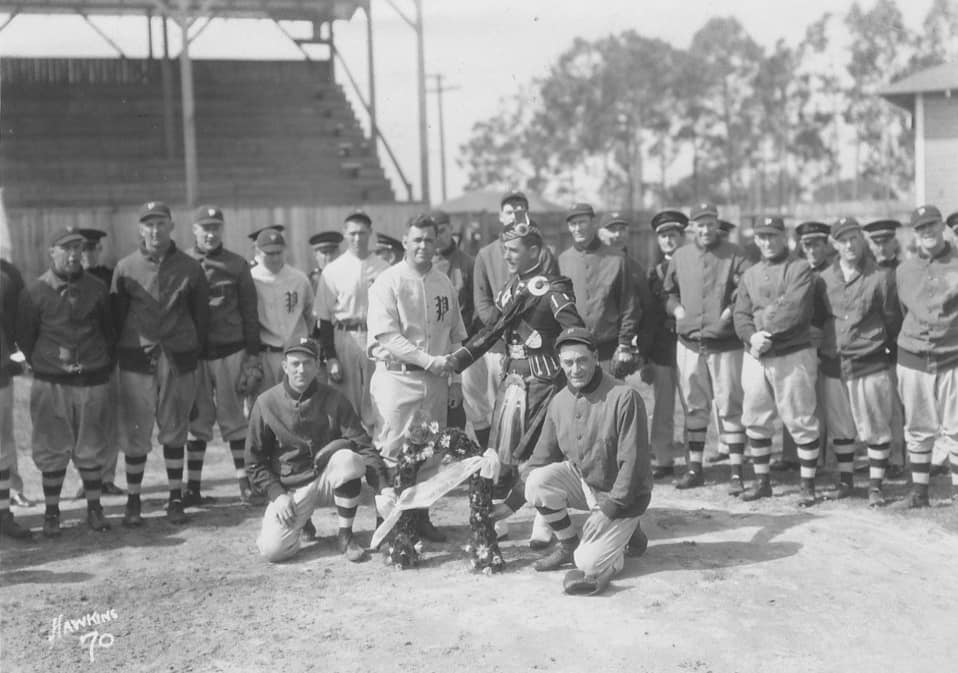
Phillies are welcomed back to Bradenton at Ninth Street Park on March 3, 1927

The Cardinals played in Bradenton in the very next season, before leaving for Stockton, California, in 1925. However, they were replaced by the Philadelphia Phillies, who played in the park until 1928, until they left for Winter Haven. In 1928, the Boston Red Sox were looking at coming to Bradenton, after spending the prior three years training in New Orleans. However, before the team would commit to the Bradenton, the Red Sox officials asked to see the attendance and financial figures of what they would see if they moved their training to Bradenton. Robert M. Beall Sr. gave the Red Sox the actual figures they requested. The Boston officials were impressed with Beall's honesty. Every other city competing for the Red Sox had given the club projected figures on what they might expect if they choose their city, not their actual figures. The Red Sox trained in Bradenton until 1930. That season the Cardinals returned to Bradenton and would stay there for the next seven springs.

==== The Cardinals' second term: The "Gashouse Gang" era ====
In the 1930s, the Cardinals returned during what journalists refer to as "the gashouse gang era". During that time they had ball players including Paul Derringer and future-Hall of Famer Dizzy Dean. Dean, who played at the stadium in the 1930s, liked Bradenton so much, he bought a local gas station and hung out there when he wasn't playing, giving the Cardinals' famed Gashouse Gang its nickname. Dean also bought a home in Bradenton. To keep him out of trouble, the Cardinals sent him to Bradenton weeks before spring training, and paid a local sportswriter to keep an eye on him. In 1937 the Cardinals moved their training to City Island Ball Park, located in Daytona Beach.

==== Boston Braves' first era ====
The Boston Bees (today's Atlanta Braves) played at the stadium until 1941, when they left for San Antonio, Texas. The stadium did not host another team for seven years.

=== World War II: Camp Weatherford ===
During World War II, many major league teams avoided the long trip to Florida for training, opting instead to hold their sessions closer to their home cities to cut down on costs. The United States military used the field as a training base from 1941 to 1945. The base was first named Camp Bradenton. However the name was later changed in 1943 to Camp Weatherford, in honor of Pfc. Willie Weatherford, who was the first Florida native killed in the war. The baseball field was filled with temporary buildings and tents and used as a United States Army Signal Corps training facility. The offices of the city's Public Works Department are next to the ballpark on land that was also part of the camp. The camp was attached to Drew Army Airfield, located in Tampa. When the war ended, that airfield became the Tampa International Airport. Meanwhile, the Camp Weatherford location was used once again for baseball. An historical marker now stands between the city offices and the stadium.

=== Return to baseball: 1948–1968 ===
==== The Braves' second era ====
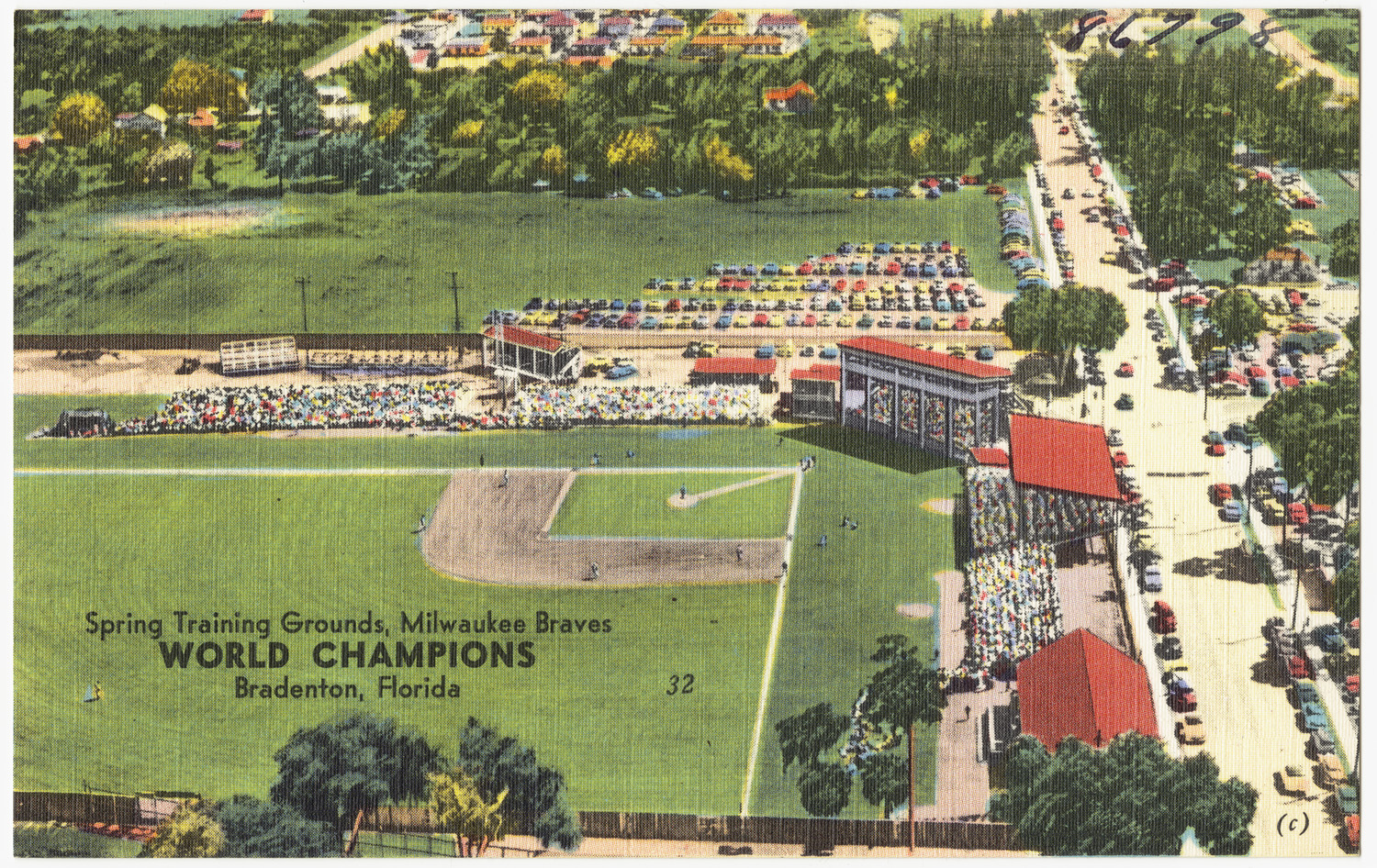
The Milwaukee Braves trained in Bradenton from 1953 to 1962

In 1948, Lou Perini, the owner of the Boston Braves (later renamed the Milwaukee Braves/Atlanta Braves) moved his club's spring training to Bradenton, after finding his club's training facility in Fort Lauderdale too windy. The Braves played in Bradenton for one year, however the city stated that if the Braves agreed to return the very next season, the city would build new clubhouses, field boxes along the first and third baselines and a new press box. The Braves agreed and stayed in Bradenton until 1963. The Braves won three National League pennants while they trained there in 1948, 1957 and 1958, and won the 1957 World Series. In 1953 the Braves moved from Boston to Milwaukee, but kept playing spring ball in Bradenton. Future Hall of famer, Hank Aaron played his first games in the major leagues in Bradenton as a rookie in 1954.

In 1950, Bradenton became the first club to allow an African-American baseball player, Sam Jethroe of the Boston Braves. This was a major breakthrough because had Florida not allowed him to join, the state would have lost all of its baseball clubs.

In March 1957, the Bradenton City Council granted permission for a semi professional Negro league baseball team to play its 10 game home schedule at the ballpark. The City of Bradenton had previously segregated Black teams to the city's "Negro quarter".

In 1962, the stadium was finally renamed after Bradenton-native, Bill McKechnie, in honor of his induction that year into the Baseball Hall of Fame as a manager.

However, after the 1962 spring training session, Lou Perini moved the Braves to Connie Mack Field, after spending $1 million on a development in West Palm Beach. The city scrambled to get a new major league team into McKechnie Field. The city and the Philadelphia Phillies almost landed in Bradenton, however city officials in Clearwater fixed several of the issues that the Phillies were unhappy about at Jack Russell Stadium. That same year the field was formally named McKechnie Field.

==== Kansas City/Oakland Athletics era ====
The Kansas City Athletics played at McKechnie Field from 1963–1968. Ironically, the team left Connie Mack Field for Bradenton, after the Milwaukee Braves arrived in West Palm Beach. The team was not open to sharing their spring training facilities or stadium with the Braves. The City of Bradenton talked A's owner Charlie Finley into staying at McKechnie until 1968. By that time, the A's relocated from Kansas City to Oakland. Finley believed that his west coast team should train on the west coast, in Mesa, Arizona. During the Athletics tenure, Finley routinely tied his Athletics team mascot, a donkey named "Charlie O", to a tree inside the stadium during games."

=== The Pirates land: 1969–present day ===
Once the Athletics left Florida for the west coast, Bradenton made plans to attract a new major league club. The city would attempt to lure the Pittsburgh Pirates or the Cleveland Indians to McKechnie Field. At the time, the Indians had a ten-year contract to play at Randolph Field, located in Tucson, Arizona and were written off by Bradenton officials. However the Pirates were unhappy at Terry Park, their spring training home for 14 years, located in Fort Myers. In February 1968, Bradenton representatives met with Pirates' general manager Joe Brown and owner John W. Galbreath and both sides agreed to a lease of 40 years, with an option for another 40 years. In 1969 the Pittsburgh Pirates began their lease of McKechnie Field. Still the team threatened to move several times in the first 34 years they had been there.

McKechnie Field was one of several host venues for the 1974 Amateur World Series, the first and only edition of the tournament (later renamed the Baseball World Cup) to be held in the United States. Because the stadium did not have floodlights at the time, a 6–6 ballgame between the United States and Nicaragua was called as a tie for darkness, precipitating a controversial tie-breaker series between the two teams after they both finished round robin play with identical 7–0–1 records.

==== The potato patch ====
Prior to 1993, the playing field at McKechnie was much less popular with the players than it is today. Whitey Herzog, the Kansas City Royals manager in the late 1970s, called it "the closest thing to a cow pasture I've seen." Pirates outfielder Dave Parker later stated "playing in the outfield [at McKechnie] was like playing in a "potato patch"." This led the city to finally install new grass and build new clubhouses, a grandstand and a press box in the 1980s. But McKechnie was still the oldest spring training facility in Florida, so city officials agreed to give the Pirates a renovated stadium to make sure they would stay.

==== The 1993 renovation ====
During the early 1990s, many teams began renovating their spring training sites. At this time, the Pirates were threatening to leave Bradenton for Winter Haven in search of better training facilities. Many of the complaints which were associated with the pre-1993 ballpark included red sand that clotted the infield, old boards serving as bleacher seats and panels hanging loose on the outfield walls. The city then stepped in with a plan to use tourism tax money to rebuild McKechnie Field. The project ended up costing $3.4 million.

In 1993 it was decided the aging stadium was in need of a massive renovation. Pittsburgh-based architect, Lou Astorino, of L.D. Astorino Companies, was put in charge of renovating the ballpark. Astorino's renovation was inspired by Forbes Field, the Pirates' old stadium in Pittsburgh, with its outfield walls which were covered in ivy, like Wrigley Field, and the view of trees outside the park. He also chose a Spanish Mission façade based on the old Bradenton railroad station. The Pirates and local officials agreed any renovation must preserve the neighborhood appeal of McKechnie.

After extensive interviews and months of work, an intimate park was recommended with new grounds, wide access ramps, concession stands, kiosks and improved sight lines, while maintaining a ballpark's classic ambiance. McKechnie's old metal chairs that served as box seats and the wooden bleachers were also removed, in favor of more modern stadium seating. The grandstand seen today at McKechnie was built as part of the 1993 renovation and holds 6,602 people. Construction on the new park started in late 1992, and was barely completed by spring training 1993. Workers were still putting numbers on the stadium seats while the Manatee High School band played just minutes before the first pitch on March 5.

The stadium's remodeling was applauded highly by Pulitzer Prize-winning author and essayist George Will for keeping the vintage baseball park look. Will was also a part-owner of the Pirates' opponents for their first game in the renovated park, the Baltimore Orioles and was in attendance. The renovation to the Spanish mission-style ballpark preserved the intimate, old-time atmosphere so well that USA Today dubbed it the "Fenway Park" of spring training stadiums. As part of the renovation the red infield dirt was replaced with a darker color dirt because Pirates' manager Jim Leyland complained of the glare and heat reflecting from the reddish sand.

Lou Astorino subsequently designed PNC Park, which became the Pirates' regular season home in 2001.

==== 2008: Forty Pirate springs and lights ====
The Pirates 40th Anniversary in Bradenton Logo

In 2008, the Pirates unveiled a commemorative logo celebrating their 40th anniversary of Spring training in Bradenton, Florida. The logo was symbolic of the club's long-term relationship with the city. The patch displayed the classic Pirates "P" on the historical façade outline of McKechnie Field. The Pirates displayed the logo throughout Spring training on a large billboard just behind the right-center field wall at McKechnie, as well as on the Pirates Spring training jerseys. The Pirates tenure in Bradenton (44 years) ranks third in longevity among teams which currently hold Spring training in Florida. Only the Detroit Tigers in Lakeland (65 years), and the Philadelphia Phillies in Clearwater (64 years) have been in their Spring training locations longer.

The renovations prior to the 2008 Spring training season included a new visitor's clubhouse, a new press lounge and lights. Improvements also included a renovation of Pirate City, the team's southern headquarters, with new offices, player dormitories and a fifth practice field. The work was partly funded by the state, which wants to prevent any more major league teams from migrating to the Cactus League in Arizona for spring training.

For the first 85 years no night games were played at the ballpark. However, lights were installed and the stadium hosted its first night game in 2008. Since the first night game was played at Wrigley Field in 1988, McKechnie had been the only ballpark used by a major league team at any time of the year that lacked lights. The Pirates have always played a handful of night exhibition games each year, but never at McKechnie. Previously, the Pirates never saw the need for lights at McKechnie, and never pushed for them. Players and team officials have long been comfortable with the routine of arriving early in the morning, getting in a day's workouts and a ballgame, then enjoying a leisurely dinner at night. However, the lack of lights meant McKechnie Field could only be used for Spring training games and the facility sat empty 11 months a year.

The installation of lights was made possible after the city of Bradenton received a $15 million grant from the state of Florida to upgrade the field. The grant fund was set up to prevent any more major league teams from migrating to the Cactus League in Arizona for Spring training. Besides the lights, the grant money paid for a new visitor's clubhouse and an expanded home clubhouse. A lighted McKechnie Field allowed for night baseball and other events, enabling the city to use the ballpark as a catalyst in an area where officials envision an entertainment district.

The first night game at McKechnie was originally scheduled for March 7 as the Pirates took on the Cincinnati Reds but the game was rained out. Instead the ballpark's first night game was played on March 19, 2008. The game resulted in a Pirates loss to the New York Yankees, 12–9.

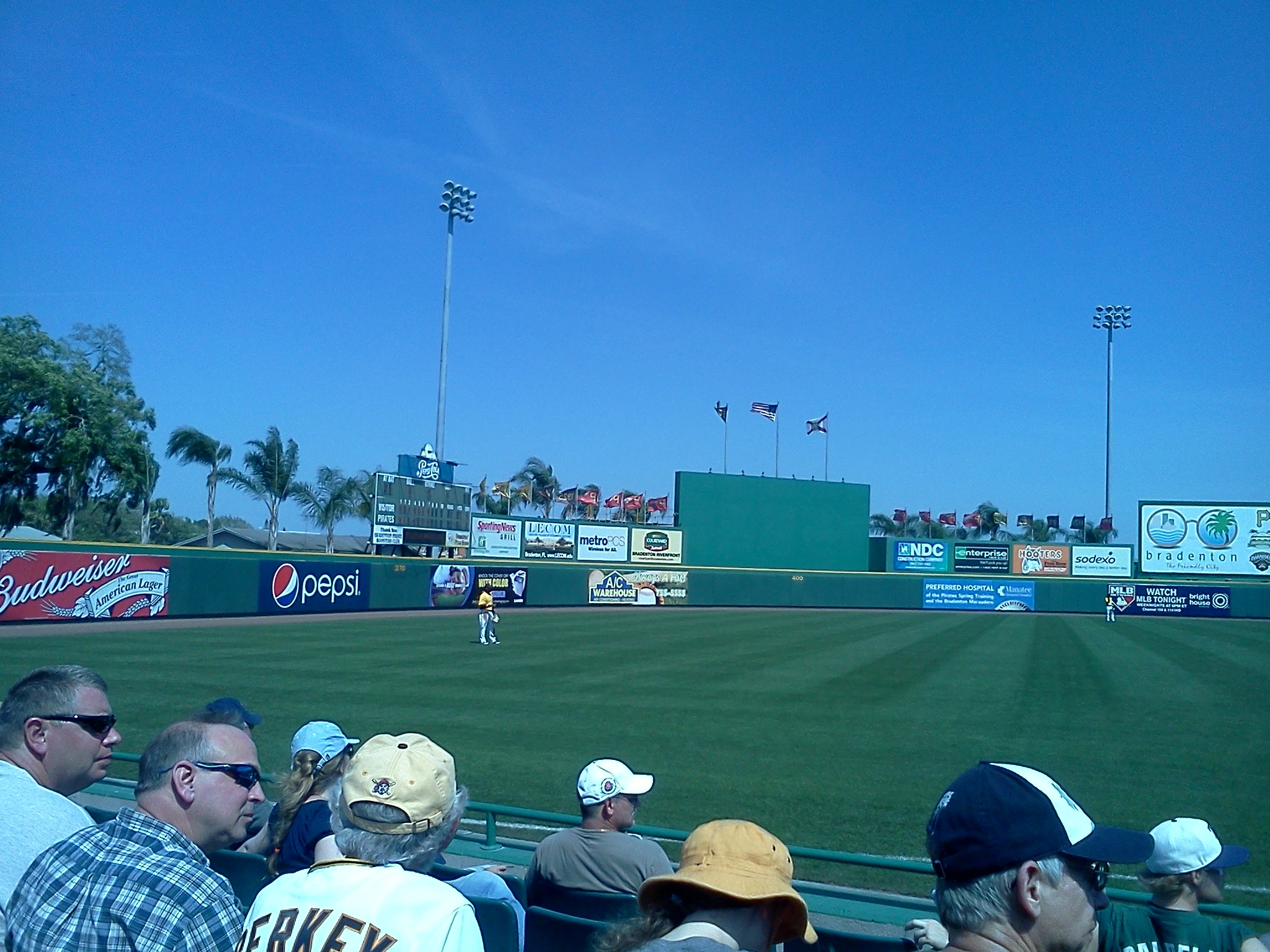
The outfield in 2011 with the Pirates' José Tábata in left field and Andrew McCutchen in center.

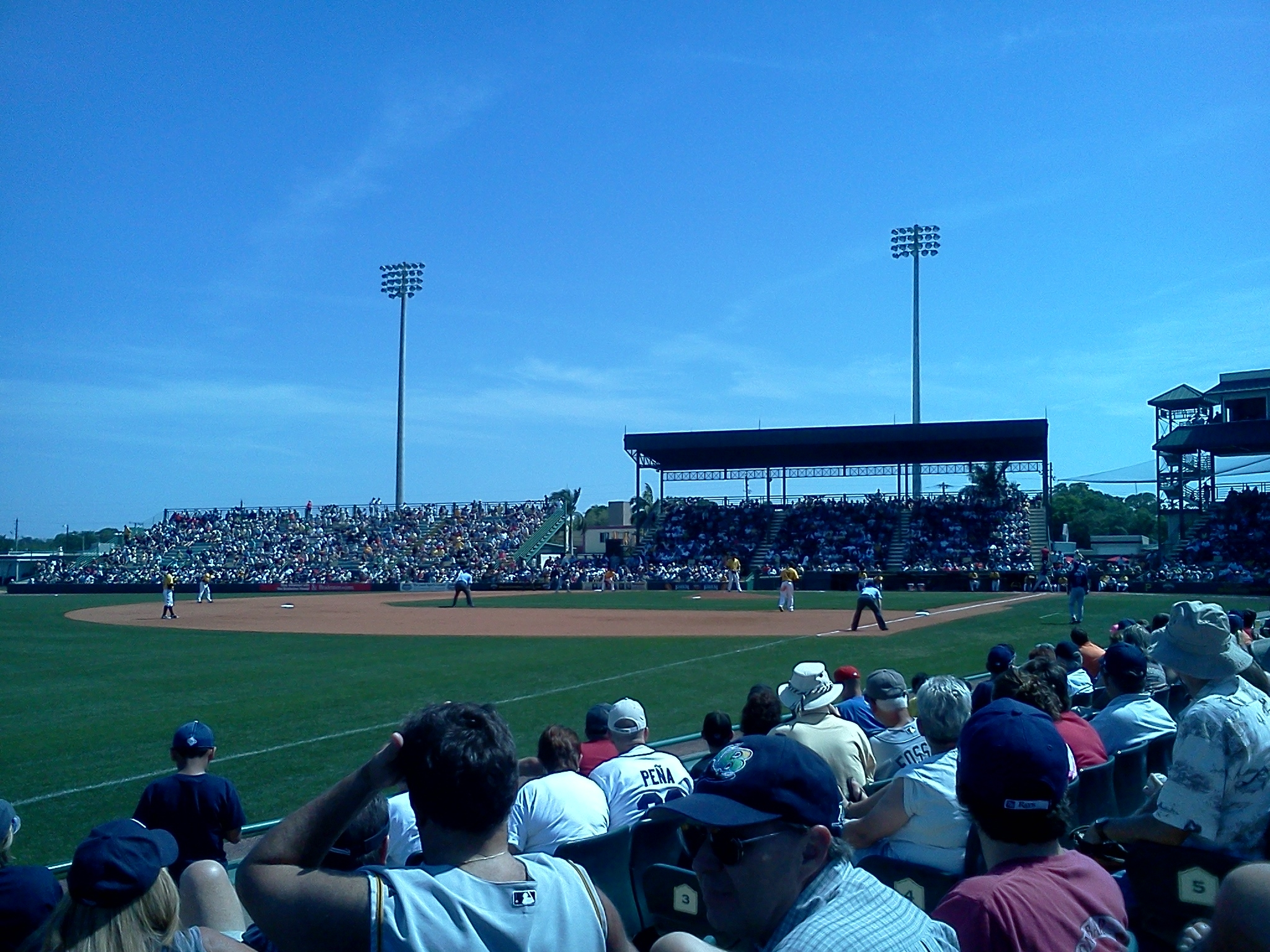
The infield during spring training in 2011.

Because of the improvements, the Pirates signed a new 30-year lease that went into effect on February 1, 2008. The team is now guaranteed to play at McKechnie Field through 2037, and after playing two night games in Bradenton in 2008 the Pirates will have many more opportunities to play under the lights over the next few decades. Pirates' alumni Bill Virdon and Chuck Tanner have both disagreed on the need for lights, stating their opinion spring training games were meant to be held in the daytime. However the lights would be key to the stadium landing a new minor league team a few years later.

=== The return of minor league baseball ===
McKechnie Field did not host a Florida State League team, since the end of Bradenton Growers era, from 1926 until 2010. From 1989–1990, the Bradenton Explorers of the Senior Professional Baseball Association played at McKechnie. The Pirates' Rookie Level minor league affiliate, the Gulf Coast Pirates, formerly the Bradenton Pirates, currently play their games at the Pirates training facility in Bradenton's Pirate City complex. However, on November 10, 2009, baseball officials voted to allow the Pirates to purchase and uproot the Cincinnati Reds' Class A affiliate, the Sarasota Reds. The team was renamed the Bradenton Marauders and play all of its home games at McKechnie Field. In return the Reds received the Pirates Class A team, the Lynchburg Hillcats. The new Bradenton team began play on April 7, 2010. The inaugural game ended in 18-3 Bradenton victory over the Fort Myers Miracle.

==== 2012–2013: "Fan-friendly" renovations ====
In early 2012, Bradenton officials planned to make a $7.5 million loan to pay for "fan-friendly" renovations to McKechnie Field. The proposed upgrades included new seating, enhanced fan plazas, a boardwalk which would circumnavigate the stadium, a tiki bar, more concession stands, restroom improvements, an upgraded sound system and scoreboard. To pay for the ballpark renovations, the city planned to take out a 20-year loan, repaying it primarily from the county's "bed tax", which visitors pay when they stay at a hotel or resort located in Manatee County. Under the deal, the Pittsburgh Pirates, who contributed the equivalent of $150,000 annually to market the city of Bradenton, planned to increase their marketing donation to $400,000 annually. That money was then to be used to promote tourism in the county. The renovations also allowed McKechnie Field to host sports events, such as high school regional tournaments.

On Tuesday 7 February 2012, Manatee County commissioners agreed to an interlocal agreement which will provide McKechnie Field with the $7.5 million in renovations. The project was slated to begin after the Pirates' 2012 spring training season and will continue around the Marauders' 2012 schedule. Improvements could be completed prior to the 2013 spring training season. The renovations will allow for the metal roof that sits over the grandstand area to be repaired. In 2011, the metal ceilings that occupied McKechnie had to be removed because of corrosion. The removal forced two Marauders home games to be relocated to Port Charlotte. Temporary awnings were put in place for the upcoming 2012 season. Construction of a new, permanent roof was planned and completed in 2013. On August 16, 2012, the Pirates announced the team would contribute an additional $2 million to $3 million for the renovations to McKechnie Field, increasing total enhancement costs for their Bradenton Spring training home from 7.5 million to approximately $10 million.

The design and construction for the renovations were performed by Fawley Bryant Architects and NDC Construction, both Manatee County businesses. The renovated ballpark was unveiled to the media on February 20, 2013. The changes come on the anniversaries of McKechnie's 90th year in existence, as well as the Pirates' 45th year at the stadium. With the changes, McKechnie became the fourth largest capacity venue in the Grapefruit League.

For both aesthetic and business reasons, McKechnie Field was chosen as the Best Ballpark Renovation, in the Over $1 Million category, of 2013 by Ballpark Digest, the leading guide to baseball and ballparks on the Internet.

==== 2014 and beyond ====
McKechnie Field hosted the 2014 Florida State League All-Star Game on Saturday, June 14, 2014. The Marauders were represented in the game by outfielder Josh Bell and left-handed pitcher Orlando Castro. The attendance of 5,882 fans for the game was the highest for the league's All-Star Game since 2006 and it was also the 3rd highest attendance in the All-Star Game's 53-year history.

In February 2015, the Pirates opened and began using a brand-new 22,500-square-foot facility at the ballpark. According to Trevor Gooby, the director of Florida Operations for the Pirates, "McKechnie was built in 1923, and the clubhouse was probably built right after the stadium was built, so it was the oldest part of McKechnie Field". The walls have the numbers of retired players and dates of victorious championships. There is also a quote from Pirates' legend Roberto Clemente located in the locker room area that reads: "When I put on my uniform, I feel I am the proudest man on earth." Other areas of the building contain a weight room, rehab center and two hydrogen pools. The $6.5 million facility was funded by the Pirates. In 2016, with over 12,000 individuals voting, readers of Ballpark Digest and Spring Training Online overwhelmingly chose McKechnie Field as the leading Grapefruit League spring-training facility in the website's annual Best of the Ballparks polling. The stadium repeated as top Spring park in Florida the following season and set a new Spring training attendance record of 106,291 over 17 games.

McKechnie Field was used as the site for each game of the 2016 Florida State League Championship series between the Marauders and the Tampa Yankees due to construction at the Yankees' stadium, Steinbrenner Field. The Marauders defeated the Yankees, in 4 games to win their first Florida State League title.

On February 10, 2017, it was announced the Pirates and the Lake Erie College of Osteopathic Medicine had reached a naming rights deal, renaming the venue LECOM Park. To continue the homage to Bill McKechnie, the home clubhouse was renamed the Bill McKechnie Home Clubhouse.

== Name-change controversy ==
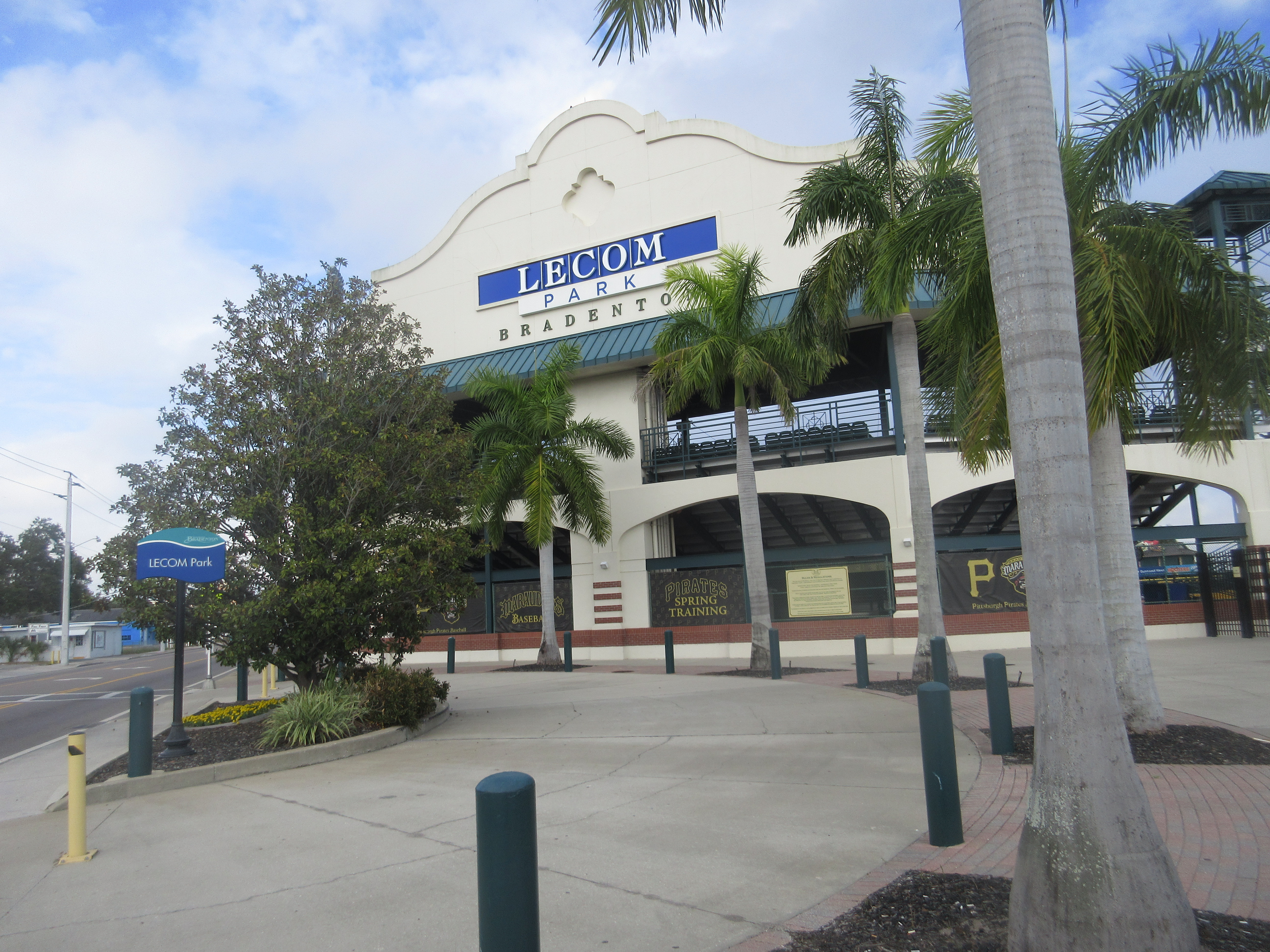
Stadium displaying its new name in 2018.

The stadium was named McKechnie Field in 1962 in honor of the former Pirates manager Bill McKechnie. However, due to a deal made with Lake Erie College of Osteopathic Medicine, the Pittsburgh Pirates organization renamed the stadium to LECOM Park in 2017. While the city of Bradenton owns the stadium, the decision to rename McKechnie Field as LECOM Park was at the sole discretion of the Pirates. Under a lease signed in 2008, the Pirates retained the naming rights for the stadium. None of the revenue from the deal will accrue to the city.

During the news conference to announce the new name, Bradenton mayor Wayne Poston said his office "was coming up empty" trying to contact Bill McKechnie's relatives. However, according to Bill McKechnie's last living daughter, Carol Montgomery, the Pirates made no effort to notify her of the stadium's name change. According to Montgomery, "[I] was very surprised and really pretty miffed, ticked off that I wasn't contacted," Montgomery said. "I had no input on it whatsoever and no one from my family did." She can't understand how the franchise couldn't track her down. Three years ago, she threw out the first pitch at a spring training game at the park in conjunction with a tour to promote her book "The Deacon's Daughter". Although the Pirates named their home clubhouse at the stadium after McKechnie to honor his legacy, his daughter still referred to the deal "as a slap in the face".

The accusation forced the Pirates to admit that their efforts to find surviving family members fell short and issued a formal apology. The press release stated: "Our intent was to locate any family members living in the area to discuss with them the partnership opportunity that we were pursuing that would include the naming rights to the ballpark. We wanted Bill McKechnie's surviving family members to know that it was important to us that we continue to honor Bill's legacy by naming the home clubhouse after him, as well as affixing a permanent plaque that would inform our fans for years to come of Bill's Hall of Fame career. Regrettably, our efforts to find Bill's surviving relatives fell short, and there is not an acceptable reason for that. We regret the fact that we did not inform Mrs. Montgomery of the name change in advance of the announcement."

The name-change proved to be unpopular with fans and the media. The Sarasota Herald-Tribune wrote that while LECOM has campuses in both Pennsylvania and Bradenton, the name change was purely financial and "foul". An NBC Sports editorial urged the spectators at LECOM Park to keep calling the stadium McKechnie Field. They argued that "The Lake Erie College of Osteopathic Medicine isn't paying you or me any money, are they? What's more, calling it LECOM Park is more likely to confuse people than enlighten them, at least for many, many years. Unless and until it becomes more misleading and confusing to refer to it as McKechnie Field than LECOM Park, people should still call it McKechnie Field."

== Attendance records ==
=== Spring training single game ===
Date	Attendance	Match-up
March 18, 2015	9,018	Detroit Tigers vs. Pittsburgh Pirates
March 17, 2013	8,541	New York Yankees vs. Pittsburgh Pirates

=== Spring training season ===
Season	Overall attendance	Average per game
2017	106,291	6,252
2015	106,038	7,069
2013	93,433	6,229

=== Minor League Baseball single game ===
Date	Attendance	Match-up
June 14, 2014	5,882	Florida State League All-Star Game
June 23, 2014	5,223	Palm Beach Cardinals vs. Bradenton Marauders

=== Minor League Baseball season ===
Season	Overall attendance	Average per game
2013	109,845	1,515
2014	104,584	1,609

== Popular culture ==
In 1989, for his book Spring Training, author William Zinsser chose McKechnie Field as a classic Florida baseball setting. McKechnie Field was also used as a backdrop for the 1987 HBO movie Long Gone.

Events and tenants
Preceded by Bright House Networks Field	Host of the Florida State League All-Star Game; 2014	Succeeded by Florida Auto Exchange Stadium
