= Louis D. Astorino =

American architect (born 1948)

Louis D. Astorino (born 1948) is an architect in Pittsburgh, Pennsylvania and the first American architect to design a building in the Vatican.

== Biography ==
Astorino was born in Pittsburgh to a family of mixed Italian and Serbian origin. His Serbian cousins influenced Astorino's upbringing and career choice. He received a bachelor's degree from Penn State College of Arts and Architecture in 1969. In 1972, he started his own firm, L. D. Astorino & Associates. It was later named Astorino.

Astorino was introduced to the international stage in 1996 when Gateway Clipper Fleet founder John E. Connelly introduced him as a prospective architect for the Domus Sanctae Marthae that Pope John Paul II wanted to build to house cardinals during the selection of popes. Connelly was offering to finance the project. Astorino's design was rejected but he was kept on as supervisory architect. He later designed the adjoining Chapel of the Holy Spirit. Astorino's firm designed the new Children's Hospital of Pittsburgh, completed in 2009 at a cost of $622 million.

In December 2014, Astorino's firm was acquired by CannonDesign, which is based in Buffalo, New York.

== Projects ==
- Domus Sanctae Marthae, Vatican (supervisory architect)
- Chapel of the Holy Spirit, Vatican (architect of record)
- Trimont condominium, Pittsburgh
- Fallingwater, Mill Run, Pennsylvania (restoration)
- PNC Park, Pittsburgh architect of record with HOK Sport
- McKechnie Field, Bradenton, Florida (1993 renovation)
- University of Pittsburgh Medical Center transplant center in Palermo, Italy
- UPMC Children's Hospital of Pittsburgh, Pittsburgh
- Three PNC Plaza
- Fred Rogers Tribute to Children monument in Pittsburgh
- Peoples Natural Gas Field
- UPMC Sports Performance Complex
