= Publix Field =

Baseball field in Lakeland, Florida

Publix Field at Joker Marchant Stadium

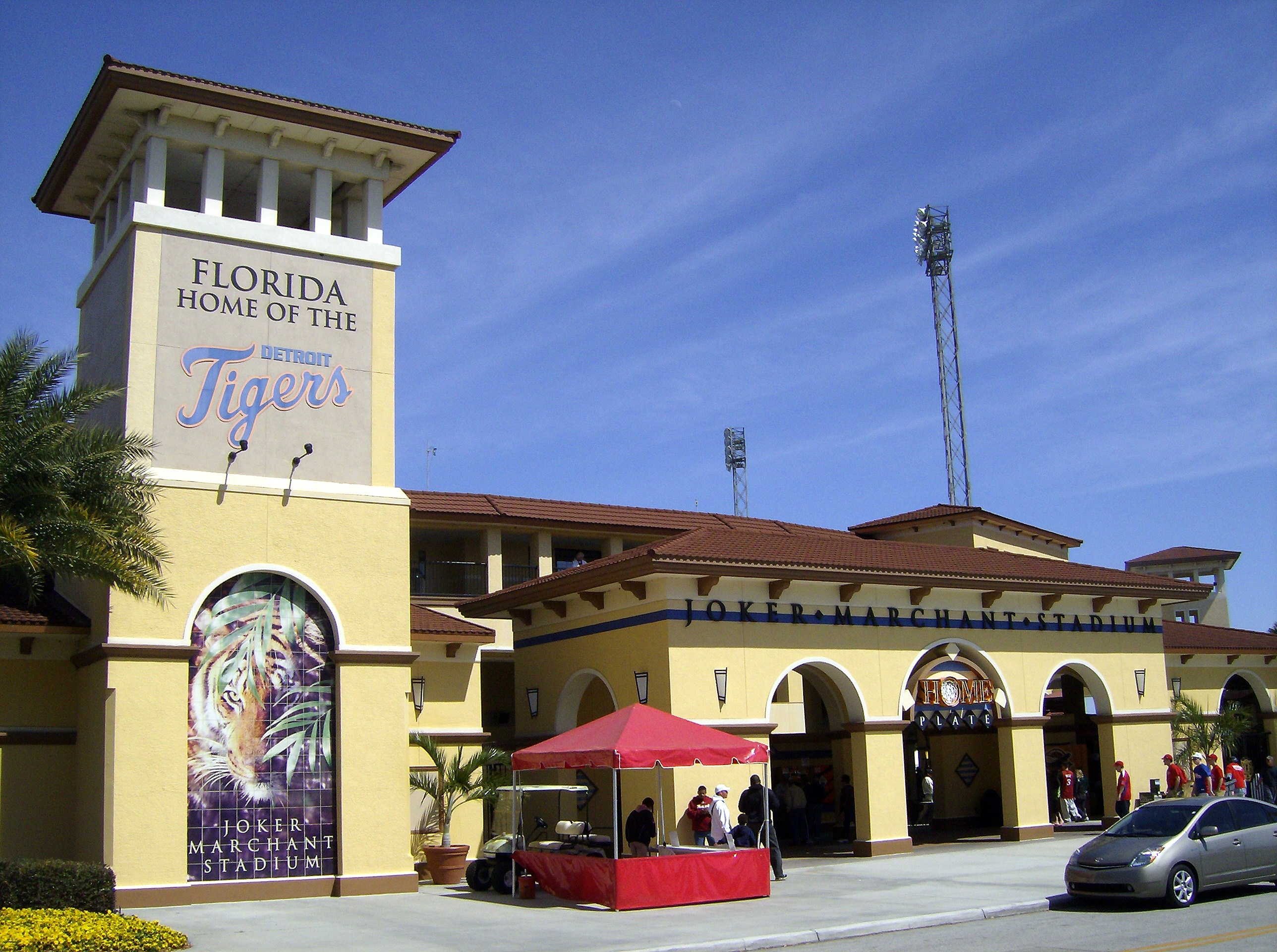
- Interactive map of Publix Field at Joker Marchant Stadium
- Address: 2301 Lakeland Hills Boulevard; Lakeland, Florida; U.S.
- Coordinates: 28°4′29″N 81°57′3″W
- Owner: City of Lakeland
- Operator: Detroit Tigers; (Stadium Operations); Delaware North; (Concessions)
- Capacity: 8,500
- Surface: Grass
- Field size: Left - 340ft.; Center - 420ft.; Right - 340ft.

Construction
- Groundbreaking: September 1965
- Opened: March 12, 1966
- Renovated: 2002, 2016, 2017
- Expanded: 1988
- Cost: $360,000; ($3.57 million in 2025 dollars)
- Architect: Lakeland Engineering Associates
- General contractor: Frank C. Decker Construction Co.

Tenants
- Lakeland Flying Tigers (FSL) (1967–2001, 2003–2015, 2017-present); Detroit Tigers (MLB) (spring training) (1966–present); FCL Tigers (FCL) (1968–present)

Publix Field at Joker Marchant Stadium is a baseball field in Lakeland, Florida. The 8,500-seat stadium was opened in 1966 and has had multiple renovations, most recently in 2017. It was named after local resident and former Lakeland Parks and Recreation Director Marcus "Joker" Marchant. It is the spring training home of the Detroit Tigers and the regular-season home of the minor league affiliates Lakeland Flying Tigers and Gulf Coast Tigers.

Joker Marchant Stadium was the one of several host venues for the 1974 Amateur World Series, the first and only edition of the tournament (later renamed the Baseball World Cup) to be held in the United States.

On March 15, 2011, the largest crowd in the stadium's history (10,307 people) watched a spring training game between the Detroit Tigers and the Boston Red Sox.

== Expansions ==
The stadium could seat 4,900 people when it opened in 1966. In 1988, a bleacher section was added down the left field line, increasing seating capacity to 7,027. In 2002, Joker Marchant Stadium was renovated. The State of Florida's $4.5 million grant was the biggest chunk of the financing, while the Polk County Tourist Development Council chipped in $2 million. The remainder of the renovation's cost was paid for by the Tigers and City of Lakeland, increasing capacity to its present 8,500.

In October 2014, the Lakeland City Commission announced part of a new agreement with the Detroit Tigers included the start of a $37 million renovation and upgrade of the 50-year-old stadium, starting in April 2016 after Major League Baseball Spring Training. Funding provided in part by the Detroit Tigers, the City of Lakeland and Polk County. Two construction firms – Barton Malow of Southfield, Michigan, and Rodda Construction of Lakeland – were chosen by the City Commission to oversee the project. The Lakeland Flying Tigers – the Detroit Tigers' High Class 'A' Minor League club at the time – played their Florida State League season at Henley Field, 1.5 miles (2.4 km) away.

== Naming rights ==
Under a 20-year deal that ends in 2036, the stadium was renamed Publix Field at Joker Marchant Stadium on the first day of MLB's 2017 Spring Training. The Publix supermarket chain is headquartered in Lakeland and their hometown field is the only sports complex for which they have purchased naming rights.

== Gallery ==
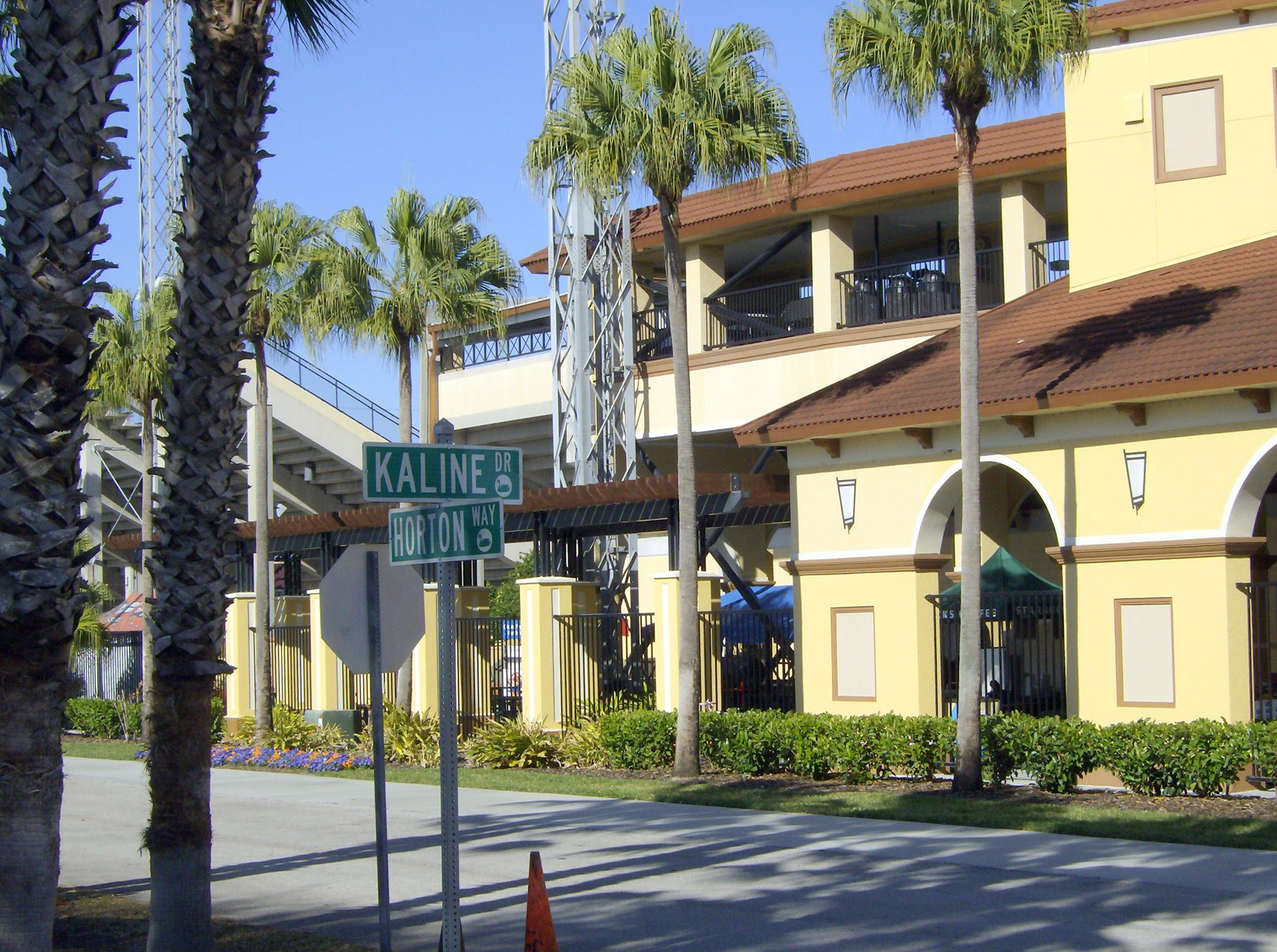
Intersection of Kaline and Horton Way

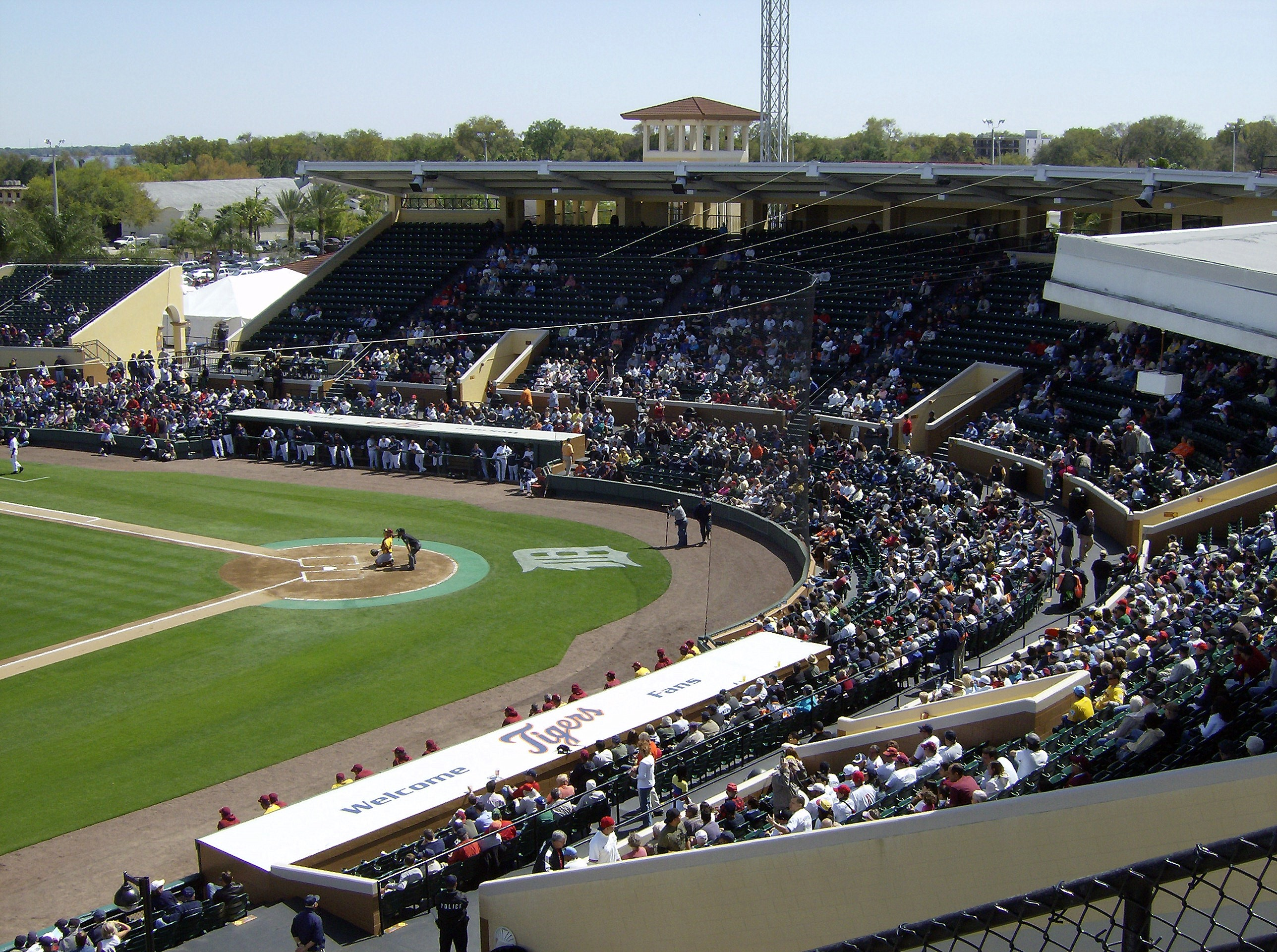
Detroit Tigers spring training game 2009

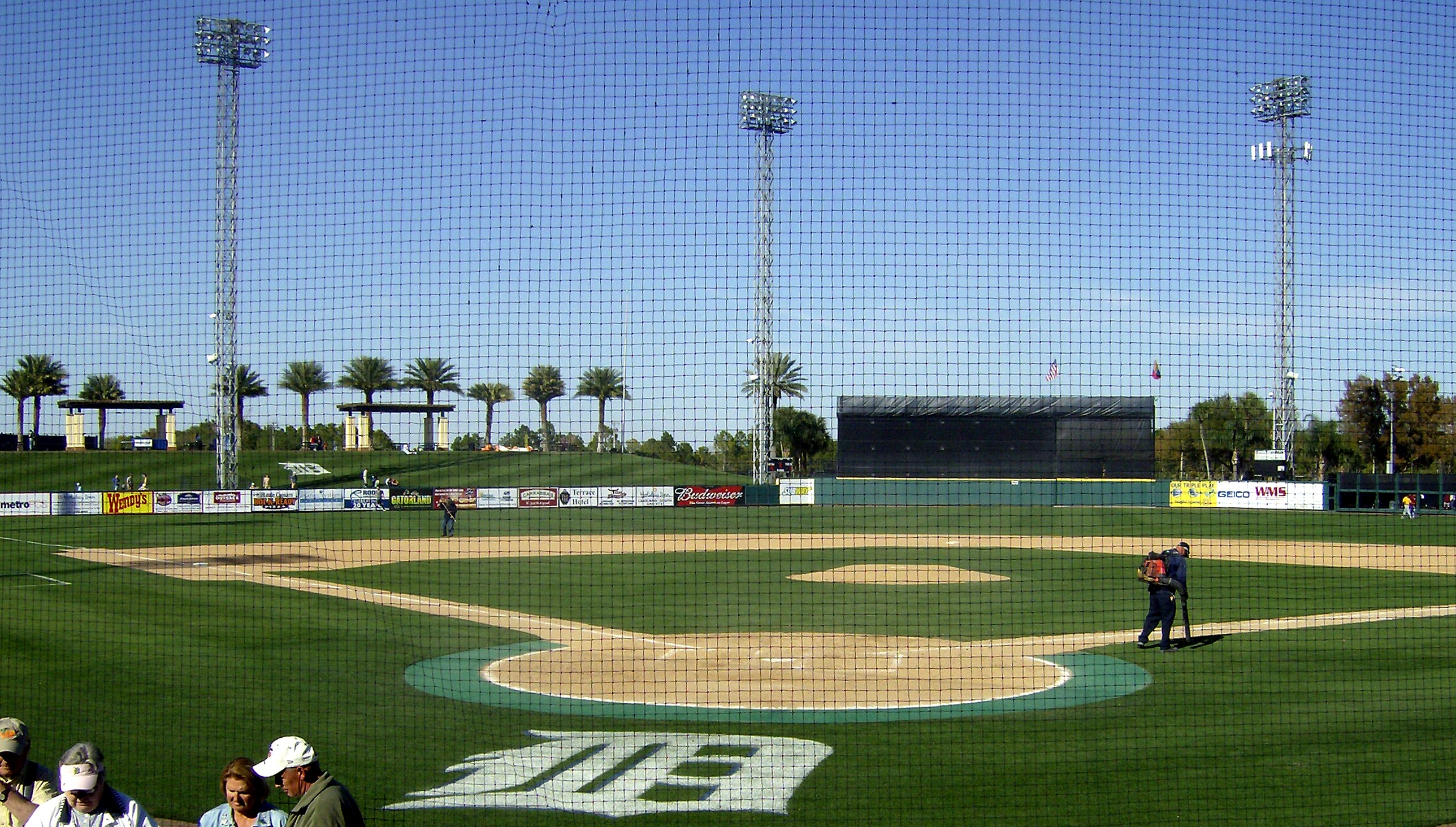
View from behind home plate
