= Tampa Tarpons (1957–1988) =

- 1957–1988; Tampa, Florida

Minor league affiliations
- Class: Class A (1963–1988); Class D (1957–1962)
- League: Florida State League (1957–1988)

Major league affiliations
- Team: Chicago White Sox (1988); Cincinnati Reds (1961–1987); Philadelphia Phillies (1957–1960)

Minor league titles
- League titles (3): 1957; 1959; 1961

Team data
- Name: Tampa White Sox (1988); Tampa Tarpons (1957–1987)
- Ballpark: Al Lopez Field

The Tampa Tarpons were a minor league baseball team based in Tampa, Florida. Their home ballpark was Al Lopez Field, and they were a member of the Class A Florida State League (FSL) from 1957 until 1988, mostly as an affiliate of the Cincinnati Reds. In 1988, they were sold, relocated, and renamed the Sarasota White Sox. During their run in Tampa, they won three FSL league championships, in 1957, 1959 and 1961.

For the 2018 season, the FSL Tampa Yankees revived the name when they were rebranded the Tampa Tarpons.

== History ==
Tampa has had a long history of minor league baseball, beginning in 1919, when the original Tampa Smokers began play as charter members of the Florida State League. The Smokers moved to the Florida International League before both the league and the team folded in 1954, temporarily leaving Tampa without a professional baseball team. The city built Al Lopez Field in 1954, and the Tampa Tarpons became the ballpark's first tenant when they began play there in 1955 as a new member of the Class D Florida State League.

The Tarpons were an independent minor league team until 1957, when they became an affiliate of the Philadelphia Phillies. In 1961, they began a long affiliation with the Cincinnati Reds. They won three league championships, in 1957, 1959 and 1961. In 1964 minor league baseball was realigned, and the Florida State League became a Class A league (now Class A-Advanced).

During the 1980s talk spread of a major league team coming to the Tampa Bay Area, which would threaten the viability of the Tarpons and other minor league teams in the region. Prior to the 1988 season the Reds moved their spring training from Tampa to Plant City, Florida, and moved their Class A franchise to Greensboro, North Carolina (the Greensboro Hornets). The Chicago White Sox subsequently moved their Class A affiliation to Tampa for the 1988 season, amid rumors that the major league White Sox would be moving to the area soon thereafter. That season the club, renamed the Tampa White Sox, drew 55,900 fans, seventh in the 14-team FSL, and went 35–35 in the first half before they won the western division second-half title at 36–24. They fell in the second round of the playoffs to the St. Lucie Mets 2 games to 0. The club was managed by Marv Foley and had one FSL All-Star, pitcher Jerry Kutzler. Foley won FSL Manager of the Year honors.

After the 1988 season, owner Mitchell Mick sold his franchise to the Chicago White Sox, who relocated the club to Sarasota, Florida, as the Sarasota White Sox. The franchise exchanged major league affiliates and nicknames several times before 2010, when they became an affiliate of the Pittsburgh Pirates and were moved and renamed the Bradenton Marauders.

Meanwhile, Tampa was without professional baseball until the Tampa Yankees re-joined the Florida State League in 1994. After the 2017 season, that team rebranded itself as the Tarpons.

== Notable Tarpon alumni ==
Many former Tarpons went on to play in the major leagues, including important members of Cincinnati's Big Red Machine of the 1970s. In 1961 Pete Rose led the Tarpons to a FSL championship with a .331 batting average and 30 triples – still a FSL record. Other Reds players from that era who started with the Tarpons include Ken Griffey, Sr., Johnny Bench, Dan Driessen, Rawly Eastwick, and Dave Concepcion. When the Reds won their next world series in 1990 with manager (and Tampa native) Lou Piniella, they again had several former Tarpons on the roster, including Tom Browning, Rob Dibble, and Paul O'Neill.

Another notable Tarpon was Randy Poffo, whose brief minor league baseball career ended in 1974 after batting .232 as a 21-year-old outfielder. Poffo would later have much more success as a professional wrestler after adopting the ring name Randy "The Macho Man" Savage.

=== Notable Tarpon players and coaches ===
- Johnny Bench (1965) 14 x MLB All-Star, 2 x NL MVP, Baseball Hall of Fame
- Bill Bonham (1980)
- Tom Browning (1983) MLB All-Star
- Ben Chapman (1951, MGR) 4 x MLB All-Star
- Dave Concepcion (1968) 9 x MLB All-Star
- Doug Corbett (1975–1976) MLB All-Star
- Rob Dibble (1984) 2 x MLB All-Star
- Dan Driessen (1970–1971)
- Rawly Eastwick (1970) 2 x NL Saves Leader
- Doug Flynn (1972)
- Tom Foley (1979)
- Ken Griffey, Sr. (1971) 3 x MLB All-Star
- Chris Hammond (1986)
- Lenny Harris (1985)
- Steve Henderson (1975)
- Jay Howell (1977) 3 x MLB All-Star
- Tom Hume (1972) MLB All-Star
- Mike LaCoss (1975) MLB All-Star
- Charlie Leibrandt (1978)
- Hal McRae (1965) 3 x MLB All-Star
- Lee May (1961–1962) 3 x MLB All-Star
- Jeff Montgomery (1984) 3 x MLB All-Star
- Paul O'Neill (1983) 5 x MLB All-Star; 1994 AL Batting Title
- Ron Oester (1975)
- Joe Oliver (1985)
- Camilo Pascual (1952) 7 x MLB All-Star
- Joe Price (1978)
- Gary Redus (1980)
- Pete Rose (1961) 17 x MLB All-Star; 3 x NL Batting Title (1968, 1969, 1973); 1963 NL Rookie of the Year; 1973 NL MVP
- Jeff Russell (1981) 2 x MLB All-Star
- Randy Savage (1974) Professional wrestler
- Mario Soto (1976) 3 x MLB All-Star
- Danny Tartabull (1981) MLB All-Star
- Dave Tomlin (1968–1969)
- Johnny Vander Meer (1961–1962, MGR) 4 x MLB All-Star
- Milt Wilcox (1968–1969)
- Jim Wynn (1962) 3 x MLB All-Star
- Joel Youngblood (1970) MLB All-Star

== Tampa Bay Rays connections ==
In 2006 the Tampa Bay Devil Rays, embarked on a rebranding effort that would include a name change; they considered adopting the Tampa Bay Tarpons name in honor of the minor league team before making the less radical step of shortening their nickname to simply the Rays in 2008. The (Devil)-Rays have worn Tampa Tarpons uniforms for several "Turn Back the Clock" games:

- On July 17, 1999, the Devil Rays wore 1960 Tarpons uniforms against the New York Mets, who wore uniforms reminiscent of those worn by their 1969 championship team.
- On June 24, 2006, the Devil Rays wore 1975 Tarpon uniforms against the Atlanta Braves, who wore their 1975 road uniforms. Coincidentally, two Rays coaches, third-base coach Tom Foley and hitting coach Steve Henderson, had both played for the Tarpons in the mid-1970s.
- On August 13, 2010, the Rays wore 1970 Tarpons uniforms against the Baltimore Orioles, who wore all-orange road uniforms used occasionally by their 1971 pennant-winning squad.

== See also ==
- Baseball in the Tampa Bay area
- Former Tarpon players
