= 1974 Amateur World Series =

Tournament details
- Country: United States
- Teams: 9
- Defending champions: Cuba

Final positions
- Champions: United States
- Runners-up: Nicaragua
- Third place: Colombia
- Fourth place: Dominican Republic

The 1974 Amateur World Series was held mainly in St. Petersburg, Florida from November 13 through November 24, 1974. It was the second baseball Amateur World Series staged by the short-lived World Amateur Baseball Federation (FEMBA), which had split off from the International Baseball Federation (FIBA) the previous year. It was the first and only Baseball World Cup tournament to be held in the United States.

Most of the tournament, including the final series between Nicaragua and the champion United States teams, was played at Al Lang Field in St. Petersburg, though some games were held in nearby Tampa, as well as Lakeland, Sarasota, and Bradenton.

The tournament was kept on the books after FEMBA once again joined with the FIBA, retroactively recognized as the Baseball World Cup XXIII. The next edition of the Amateur World Series would be played in

== Tournament summary ==
The 1974 Amateur World Series was the second to be organized by FEMBA after the organization split from FIBA, and the first to be staged in the United States. As such, FIBA member states such as Cuba, Venezuela, Mexico, and Panama were not invited (they participated in a FIBA tournament held in Havana the previous year). The Honduras national team had been invited, but withdrew after Hurricane Fifi hit the country.

From the beginning, the tournament suffered from attendance and financing issues; the organizing budget had been set for only $10,000. Teams were critical of the conditions for their athletes, including the Dominican team, which had to leave its motel after it was unable to pay the bill, which was footed by the team rather than the organizers. There were also several on-field controversies; police had to be called to the stadiums on two occasions, and the Taiwanese team nearly withdrew after a contentious decision that saw a player get called out after he hit a triple, on the charge that he had used a colored bat. In one instance, Puerto Rico forfeited their game with the United States after the team's manager and catcher were both ejected for arguing a hit-by-pitch call, and refused to leave the field.

The final tie-breaker between Nicaragua and the United States also sparked controversy. Both teams finished with identical 7-0-1 records, with their only meeting having been called because of darkness while tied 6-6. The Nicaraguans claimed that according to international rules, the game should be replayed in its entirety, with the winner being crowned world champion. However, FEMBA president William Fehring ruled the teams would instead play a best-of-three series, with the winner taking the championship. Nicaragua won the first game, which they said counted as the replayed game, but lost the second in a doubleheader on Saturday, Nov. 23. Several Nicaraguan players protested the ruling, saying they had won the tournament by virtue of winning the first game; even Nicaraguan executive and FEMBA vice president Carlos García Solórzano said "we should be champions right now," to no avail. The two teams played a third game on Sunday, Nov. 24, with the U.S. winning 9–2.

== Venue ==
St. Petersburg, Florida	1974 Amateur World Series is located in Florida	Tampa, Florida
Al Lang Field	1974 Amateur World Series is located in Florida	Al Lopez Field
Capacity: 7,500	1974 Amateur World Series is located in Florida	Capacity: 5,000
Bradenton, Florida	Lakeland, Florida	Sarasota, Florida
McKechnie Field	Joker Marchant Stadium	Payne Park
Capacity: 2,000	Capacity: 4,900	Capacity: 4,000

== Group stage ==
Pos	Team	Pld	W	L	T	RF	RA	RD	PCT	GB
1	United States (H)	8	7	0	1	63	13	+50	.938	—
2	Nicaragua	8	7	0	1	51	17	+34	.938	—
3	Colombia	8	5	3	0	45	26	+19	.625	2.5
4	Dominican Republic	8	3	5	0	37	43	−6	.375	4.5
5	Canada	8	3	5	0	45	62	−17	.375	4.5
6	Italy	8	3	5	0	23	40	−17	.375	4.5
7	Taiwan	8	3	5	0	36	28	+8	.375	4.5
8	Puerto Rico	8	3	5	0	34	39	−5	.375	4.5
9	South Africa	8	1	7	0	13	79	−66	.125	6.5

Source: St. Petersburg Times
(H) Hosts

=== Results ===
November 13, 1974	United States	10–0 (F/8)	Dominican Republic	Al Lang Field, St. Petersburg; Attendance: 1,000
November 13, 1974		Boxscore		Al Lang Field, St. Petersburg; Attendance: 1,000

November 14, 1974; 16:30 (UTC-5)	Puerto Rico	0–6 (F/8)	Taiwan	Al Lang Field, St. Petersburg
November 14, 1974; 16:30 (UTC-5)		Boxscore		Al Lang Field, St. Petersburg

November 14, 1974; 19:30 (UTC-5)	Italy	2–7	Canada	Al Lang Field, St. Petersburg
November 14, 1974; 19:30 (UTC-5)		Boxscore		Al Lang Field, St. Petersburg

November 14, 1974; 19:30 (UTC-5)	Nicaragua	11–2	South Africa	Joker Marchant Stadium, Bradenton
November 14, 1974; 19:30 (UTC-5)		Boxscore		Joker Marchant Stadium, Bradenton

November 15, 1974; 16:30 (UTC-5)	Puerto Rico	0–5	Nicaragua	Payne Park, Sarasota
November 15, 1974; 16:30 (UTC-5)		Boxscore		Payne Park, Sarasota

November 15, 1974; 17:30 (UTC-5)	South Africa	1–11 (F/6)	Dominican Republic	Al Lang Field, St. Petersburg
November 15, 1974; 17:30 (UTC-5)		Boxscore		Al Lang Field, St. Petersburg

November 15, 1974; 20:30 (UTC-5)	Italy	1–7	Colombia	Al Lang Field, St. Petersburg
November 15, 1974; 20:30 (UTC-5)		Boxscore		Al Lang Field, St. Petersburg

November 15, 1974; 16:30 (UTC-5)	Taiwan	2–3	United States	Payne Park, Sarasota
November 15, 1974; 16:30 (UTC-5)		Boxscore		Payne Park, Sarasota

November 16, 1974; 11:30 (UTC-5)	Colombia	0–5	Dominican Republic	McKechnie Field, Bradenton

November 16, 1974; 14:30 (UTC-5)	United States	6–6 (F/9)	Nicaragua	McKechnie Field, Bradenton

November 16, 1974; 16:30 (UTC-5)	South Africa	4–3 (F/10)	Italy	Al Lang Field, St. Petersburg
November 16, 1974; 16:30 (UTC-5)		Boxscore		Al Lang Field, St. Petersburg

November 16, 1974; 19:30 (UTC-5)	Taiwan	6–7	Canada	Al Lang Field, St. Petersburg
November 16, 1974; 19:30 (UTC-5)		Boxscore		Al Lang Field, St. Petersburg

November 17, 1974; 10:00 (UTC-5)	Italy	3–2 (F/10)	Dominican Republic	Al Lang Field, St. Petersburg
November 17, 1974; 10:00 (UTC-5)		Boxscore		Al Lang Field, St. Petersburg

November 17, 1974; 10:00 (UTC-5)	South Africa	0–10 (F/8)	Colombia	Al Lopez Field, Tampa
November 17, 1974; 10:00 (UTC-5)		Boxscore		Al Lopez Field, Tampa

November 17, 1974; 13:00 (UTC-5)	Nicaragua	5–1	Taiwan	Al Lopez Field, Tampa
November 17, 1974; 13:00 (UTC-5)		Boxscore		Al Lopez Field, Tampa

November 17, 1974; 16:00 (UTC-5)	Canada	5–6	Puerto Rico	Al Lang Field, St. Petersburg
November 17, 1974; 16:00 (UTC-5)		Boxscore		Al Lang Field, St. Petersburg

November 18, 1974; 11:00 (UTC-5)	South Africa	1–11 (F/8)	United States	Al Lang Field, St. Petersburg
November 18, 1974; 11:00 (UTC-5)		Boxscore		Al Lang Field, St. Petersburg

November 18, 1974; 14:00 (UTC-5)	Taiwan	3–6	Italy	Al Lang Field, St. Petersburg
November 18, 1974; 14:00 (UTC-5)		Boxscore		Al Lang Field, St. Petersburg

November 18, 1974; 17:00 (UTC-5)	Puerto Rico	7–2	Dominican Republic	Al Lang Field, St. Petersburg
November 18, 1974; 17:00 (UTC-5)		Boxscore		Al Lang Field, St. Petersburg

November 18, 1974; 20:00 (UTC-5)	Canada	5–14	Colombia	Al Lang Field, St. Petersburg
November 18, 1974; 20:00 (UTC-5)		Boxscore		Al Lang Field, St. Petersburg

November 19, 1974; 16:00 (UTC-5)	Italy	0–6	Nicaragua	Al Lang Field, St. Petersburg
November 19, 1974; 16:00 (UTC-5)		Boxscore		Al Lang Field, St. Petersburg

November 19, 1974; 16:30 (UTC-5)	Dominican Republic	12–11	Canada	Al Lopez Field, Tampa
November 19, 1974; 16:30 (UTC-5)		Boxscore		Al Lopez Field, Tampa

November 19, 1974; 19:30 (UTC-5)	Colombia	5–2	Taiwan	Al Lang Field, St. Petersburg
November 19, 1974; 19:30 (UTC-5)		Boxscore		Al Lang Field, St. Petersburg

November 19, 1974; 19:30 (UTC-5)	United States	5–1 (F/8)	Puerto Rico	Al Lopez Field, Tampa
November 19, 1974; 19:30 (UTC-5)		Boxscore		Al Lopez Field, Tampa

November 20, 1974; 12:00 (UTC-5)	Colombia	6–1	Puerto Rico	Al Lang Field, St. Petersburg
November 20, 1974; 12:00 (UTC-5)		Boxscore		Al Lang Field, St. Petersburg

November 20, 1974; 19:30 (UTC-5)	Canada	5–3	South Africa	Joker Marchant Stadium, Lakeland
November 20, 1974; 19:30 (UTC-5)		Boxscore		Joker Marchant Stadium, Lakeland

November 20, 1974; 19:30 (UTC-5)	Nicaragua	7–3	Dominican Republic	Al Lang Field, St. Petersburg
November 20, 1974; 19:30 (UTC-5)		Boxscore		Al Lang Field, St. Petersburg

November 20, 1974; 19:30 (UTC-5)	United States	8–0	Italy	Joker Marchant Stadium, Lakeland
November 20, 1974; 19:30 (UTC-5)		Boxscore		Joker Marchant Stadium, Lakeland

November 21, 1974; 11:00 (UTC-5)	Taiwan	12–0 (F/8)	South Africa	Al Lang Field, St. Petersburg
November 21, 1974; 11:00 (UTC-5)		Boxscore		Al Lang Field, St. Petersburg

November 21, 1974; 14:00 (UTC-5)	Canada	4–5	Nicaragua	Al Lang Field, St. Petersburg
November 21, 1974; 14:00 (UTC-5)		Boxscore		Al Lang Field, St. Petersburg

November 21, 1974; 17:00 (UTC-5)	Puerto Rico	3–8	Italy	Al Lang Field, St. Petersburg
November 21, 1974; 17:00 (UTC-5)		Boxscore		Al Lang Field, St. Petersburg

November 21, 1974; 19:30 (UTC-5)	Colombia	2–6	United States	Al Lang Field, St. Petersburg
November 21, 1974; 19:30 (UTC-5)		Boxscore		Al Lang Field, St. Petersburg

November 22, 1974; 10:00 (UTC-5)	South Africa	2–16 (F/7)	Puerto Rico	Al Lang Field, St. Petersburg
November 22, 1974; 10:00 (UTC-5)		Boxscore		Al Lang Field, St. Petersburg

November 22, 1974; 14:00 (UTC-5)	Dominican Republic	2–4	Taiwan	Al Lang Field, St. Petersburg
November 22, 1974; 14:00 (UTC-5)		Boxscore		Al Lang Field, St. Petersburg

November 22, 1974; 19:30 (UTC-5)	United States	14–1 (F/7)	Canada	Al Lang Field, St. Petersburg
November 22, 1974; 19:30 (UTC-5)		Boxscore		Al Lang Field, St. Petersburg

November 22, 1974; 19:30 (UTC-5)	Nicaragua	6–1	Colombia	Joker Marchant Stadium, Sarasota
November 22, 1974; 19:30 (UTC-5)		Boxscore		Joker Marchant Stadium, Sarasota

== Tie-breaker ==
Pos	Team	Pld	W	L	RF	RA	RD	PCT	GB
1	United States (H)	3	2	1	14	8	+6	.667	—
2	Nicaragua	3	1	2	8	14	−6	.333	1

Source: Centro Caribe Sports Archived August 30, 2024, at the Wayback Machine
(H) Hosts

=== Results ===
November 23, 1974; 11:00 (UTC–5)	United States	1–3	Nicaragua	Al Lang Field, St. Petersburg
November 23, 1974; 11:00 (UTC–5)		Boxscore		Al Lang Field, St. Petersburg

November 23, 1974	Nicaragua	3–4	United States	Al Lang Field, St. Petersburg
November 23, 1974		Boxscore		Al Lang Field, St. Petersburg

November 24, 1938; 11:00 (UTC–5)	Nicaragua	2–9	United States	Al Lang Field, St. Petersburg
November 24, 1938; 11:00 (UTC–5)		Boxscore		Al Lang Field, St. Petersburg

== Final standings ==
Rk	Team	Record
1st place, gold medalist(s)	United States	9–1–1
2nd place, silver medalist(s)	Nicaragua	8–2–1
3rd place, bronze medalist(s)	Colombia	5–3
4	Dominican Republic	3–5
5	Canada	3–5
6	Italy	3–5
7	Taiwan	3–5
8	Puerto Rico	3–5
9	South Africa	1–7

== Honors and awards ==
=== Statistical leaders ===
Batting leaders
Statistic	Name	Total
Batting average	(Nicaragua) Julio Cuarezma	.478
Hits	2 tied with (Note: Gonzalez (PRI), Moreno (COL))	12
Runs	3 tied with (Note: Julio Cuarezma (NIC), Chang (ROC), Moreno (COL))	9
Home runs	2 tied with (Note: David Coon (USA), P. Llamas (COL))	3
Runs batted in	(Nicaragua) César Jarquin	10
Stolen bases	2 tied with (Note: Dave Stegman (USA), Brent Hallett (CAN))	5

Pitching leaders
Statistic	Name	Total
Earned run average	4 tied with (Note: Porfirio Altamirano (NIC), George Milke (USA), Mark Beem (USA), R. Izquierdo (COL))	0.00
Strikeouts	(United States) George Milke	21
Shutouts	(Nicaragua) Porfirio Altamirano	2
Innings pitched	(Taiwan) Hsien-Tsung Hu	29

=== Awards ===
Award	Player	Ref.
Best Batter	(Nicaragua) Julio Cuarezma	
Best Pitcher	(Nicaragua) Porfirio Altamirano	
Best Designated Hitter	(Nicaragua) Pablo Juárez	

=== All-Star Team ===
Position	Player
C	(United States) Rick Cerone
1B	(Taiwan) He Lin
2B	(Nicaragua) Guillermo Baldizón
3B	(Colombia) Carlos Velasquez
SS	(Nicaragua) César Jarquin
OF	(Nicaragua) Julio Cuarezma
OF	(United States) Dave Stegman
OF	(Puerto Rico) Alejandro Gonzalez
OF	(Canada) Brent Hallett
OF	(Nicaragua) Bonard Luzey
UTIL	(United States) Steve Davis
DH	(Nicaragua) Pablo Juárez
P	(Nicaragua) Porfirio Altamirano
P	(United States) George Milke
P	(United States) Bo McLaughlin
P	(Colombia) Wilfrido Petro
P	(Nicaragua) Sergio Lacayo
P	(Taiwan) Hsien-Tsung Hu
