= Ed Smith Stadium =

Baseball field in Sarasota, Florida, US

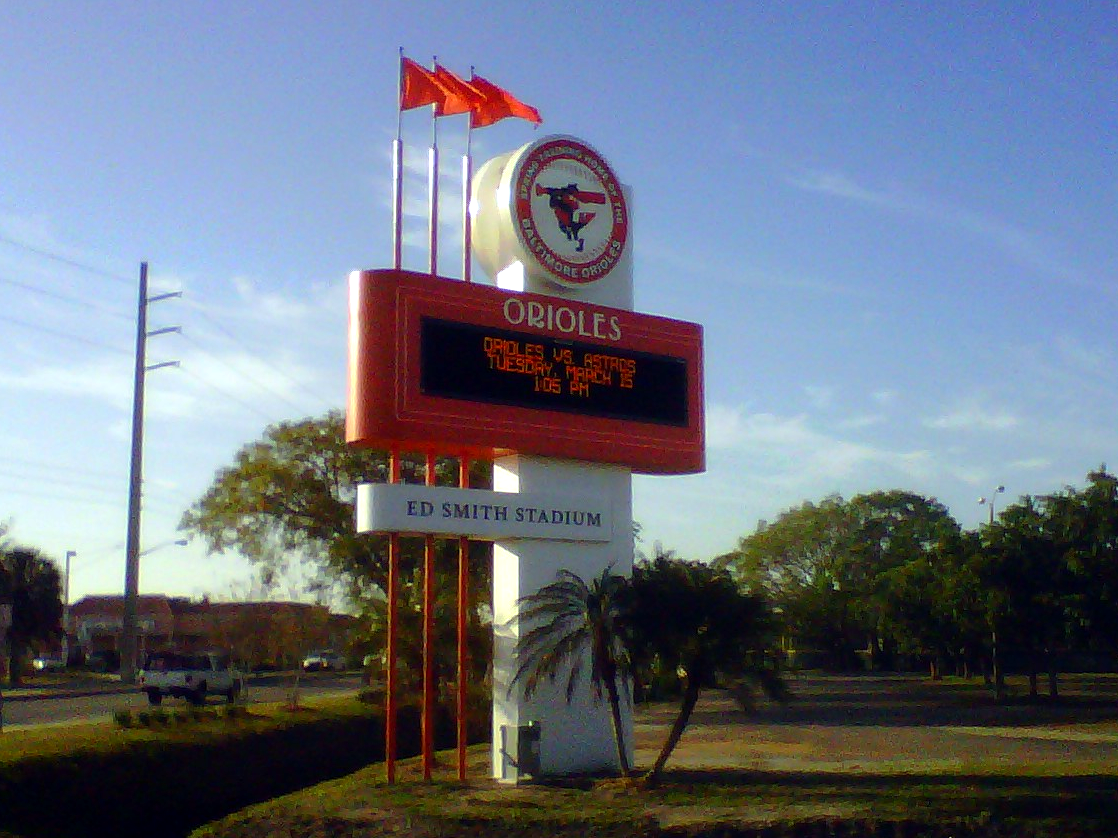
- Interactive map of Ed Smith Stadium
- Location: 2700 12th Street; Sarasota, FL 34237
- Coordinates: 27°20′52″N 82°31′2″W
- Owner: Sarasota County
- Operator: Baltimore Orioles
- Capacity: 8,500
- Surface: Grass
- Field size: Left – 340 ft (100 m); Left Center – 366 ft (112 m); Center – 400 ft (120 m); Right Center – 374 ft (114 m); Right – 340 ft (100 m)

Construction
- Opened: 1989
- Renovated: 2011
- Architects: Populous Original Structure; David M Schwarz Architects, Inc Renovation
- Structural engineers: Bliss & Nyitray, Inc (renovation)

Tenants
- Baltimore Orioles (spring training) (1991, 2010–present); Cincinnati Reds (spring training) (1998–2009); Chicago White Sox (spring training) (1989–1997); Sarasota Reds (FSL) (2004–2009); Sarasota Red Sox (FSL) (1994–2004); Sarasota White Sox (FSL) (1989–1993); GCL Reds (GCL) (2004–2009); FCL Orioles (2010–present)

Ed Smith Stadium is a baseball field located in Sarasota, Florida. Since 2010, it has been the spring training home of the Baltimore Orioles.

== History ==
Ed Smith Stadium was built in 1989 to replace Payne Park as a Spring Training and Minor League Baseball site. It is named for the Sarasota civic leader who was instrumental in getting the new stadium built. It was formerly the spring home of the Chicago White Sox (1989–1997) and the Baltimore Orioles (1991). In 1998, it replaced Plant City Stadium as the spring training home of the Cincinnati Reds. The Reds remained at the facility through 2008. After Cincinnati's club moved its spring activities to Arizona, Ed Smith Stadium spent a year without major league Spring Training.

The Orioles became the stadium's tenant and operator in 2010. Baltimore had trained within Sarasota County previously at Twin Lakes Park in 1989 and 1990, as well as at Ed Smith in 1991—before moving to St. Petersburg and then Ft. Lauderdale for spring games.

From 1989 to 2009, the stadium hosted a series of Minor League Baseball teams, the Single-A Sarasota White Sox, Sarasota Red Sox, and Sarasota Reds. From 2004 until 2009, it housed the Gulf Coast League's Gulf Coast Reds. Ed Smith has also hosted high school and college baseball tournaments.

On November 1, 2008, Barack Obama gave a speech to a crowd of 10,000 spectators as part of his 2008 presidential campaign.

== Renovation ==
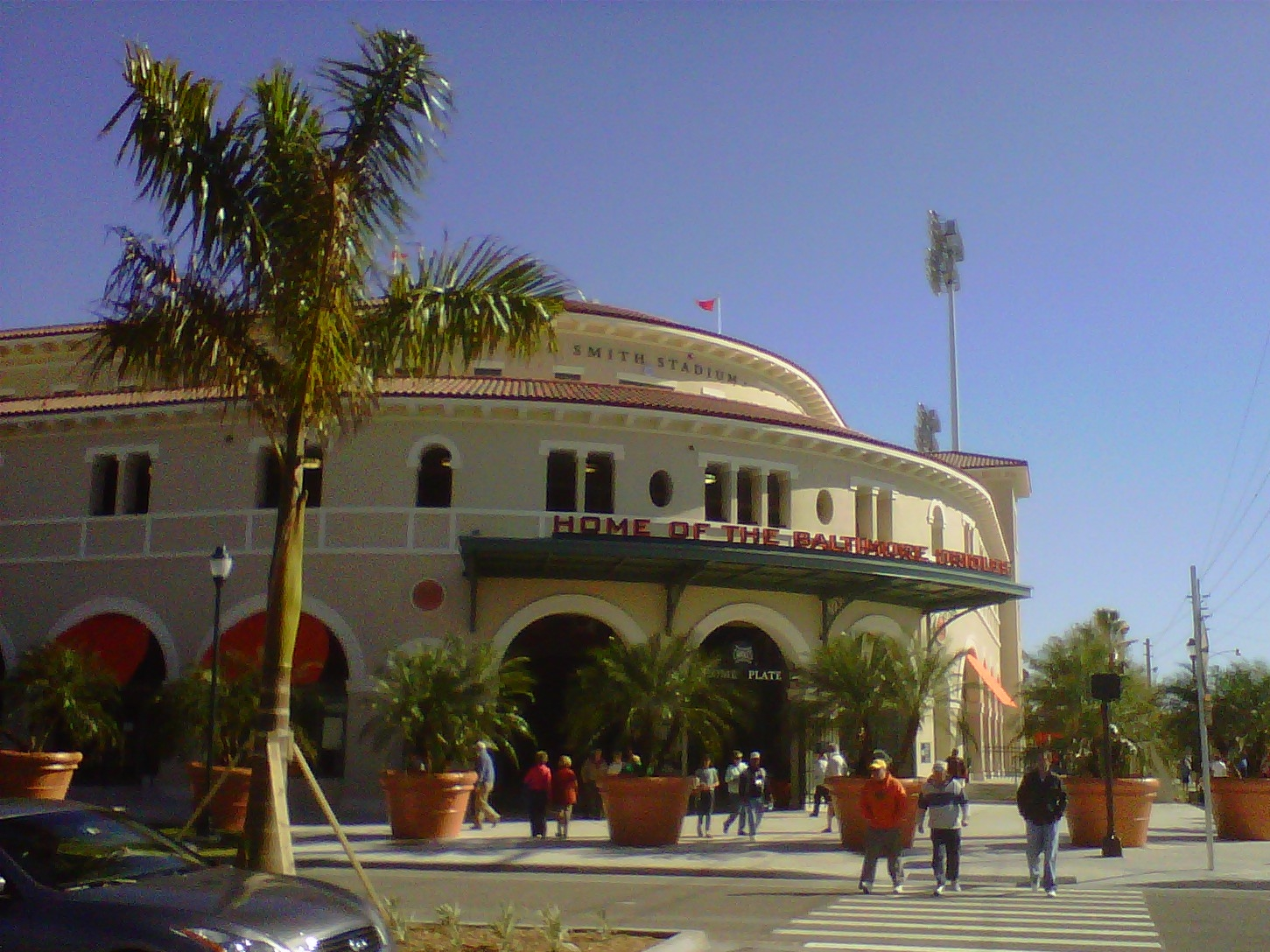
Ed Smith Stadium after renovations

In 2008, a planned renovation fell through when a proposed bond issue from the city of Sarasota to partially fund the renovation was rejected by the voters. The Reds, whose lease with the city and the stadium expired after the season, announced that they intend to seek a new spring training home. They moved to Goodyear Ballpark, located in Arizona, in 2010.

The Baltimore Orioles reached a tentative 30-year agreement to begin spring training at Ed Smith Stadium starting in 2010 which included renovations to the stadium and surrounding areas. The $31.2 million renovation was completed prior to the beginning of spring training in February 2011.

== Features after renovation ==
Seats in the renovated stadium are refurbished seats from the Orioles' home ballpark, Oriole Park at Camden Yards in downtown Baltimore. Three air-conditioned suites added to the park are numbered Suites 66, 70, and 83, corresponding to the club's three World Series championships. A fabric sunshade system extends from the stadium's original roof to nearly double the number of seats in the shade.

A series of photos produced by the Orioles shows the dramatic changes resulting from the renovation.

Seating is available for 7,428 spectators, with standing room space taking the park's total capacity to 8,500. Two concourses include food and beverage stands, a cafe, and a 2,000-square-foot (190 m^{2}) gift shop. 100 HDTVs are located throughout the stadium and a HD LED video board in the outfield measures 17 feet (5.2 m) high by 30 feet (9.1 m) across.
