= Sarasota Reds =

- 1989–2009; Sarasota, Florida
Team logo
Cap insignia

Minor league affiliations
- Class: Class A-Advanced (1990–2009); Class A (1989)
- League: Florida State League (1989–2009)

Major league affiliations
- Team: Cincinnati Reds (2005–2009); Boston Red Sox (1994–2004); Chicago White Sox (1989–1993)

Minor league titles
- Division titles (2): 1989; 1992

Team data
- Name: Sarasota Reds (2005–2009); Sarasota Red Sox (1994–2004); Sarasota White Sox (1989–1993)
- Mascots: Rally Gator (2005–2009); Gordy the Gecko (2000–2004); Socko (1995–2001); Perky the Pelican (1989–1994)
- Ballpark: Ed Smith Stadium (1990–2009); Payne Park (1989)

The Sarasota Reds were a professional minor league baseball team, located in Sarasota, Florida, as a member of the Florida State League. The team originally started play in Sarasota as the Sarasota White Sox in 1989. They remained in the city for the next 21 seasons, going through a series of name changes due to their affiliation changes. They were known as the White Sox from 1989–1993, as the Sarasota Red Sox from 1994–2004, and the Reds from 2004–2009. In Sarasota, the team played in Payne Park (1989) and then Ed Smith Stadium (1990–2009). They won two division championships, in 1989 and 1992, and made playoff appearances in 1989, 1991, 1992, 1994, and 2007.

== History ==
The roots of the Sarasota Reds franchise can be traced back to the Tampa Tarpons. In the 1980s, rumors arose that a major league team would come to Tampa, which would threaten the viability of the Tarpons and other minor league teams in the Tampa Bay Area. In 1988, the Chicago White Sox replaced Cincinnati as the Tarpons' affiliate, causing speculation that the White Sox would themselves relocate to the area. Fearing his team would soon be displaced, in 1989, Tarpons owner Mitchell Mick sold his franchise to the White Sox, who moved it to Sarasota, Florida and renamed it as the Sarasota White Sox.

The team's Sarasota era produced many notable player who would go on to play in the majors. Bo Jackson, Mike LaValliere, Dave Stieb, Hall of Famer Frank Thomas and Bob Wickman all played for the Sarasota White Sox. Meanwhile, Stan Belinda, David Eckstein, Nomar Garciaparra, Byung-hyun Kim, Jeff Suppan, Dustin Pedroia, Jonathan Papelbon, and Kevin Youkilis were alumni of the Sarasota Red Sox. The Sarasota Reds also produced many notable major league players such as Jay Bruce, Johnny Cueto, Joey Votto, Chris Heisey, and Drew Stubbs.

After the Reds' spring-training departure from Florida's Grapefruit League to Arizona's Cactus League in 2009, the Reds and Pittsburgh Pirates did an "affiliate-swap". The Pirates took over the Sarasota Reds, while the Reds became the parent club of the Pirates' former Class A-Advanced affiliate, the Lynchburg Hillcats of the Carolina League. The Pittsburgh Pirates have had their spring training facilities based in Bradenton, Florida since in 1969, when the city met with Pirates' general manager Joe Brown and owner John W. Galbreath and both sides agreed to a lease of 40 years, with an option for another 40 years. On November 10, 2009, baseball officials voted to allow the Pirates to purchase and uproot the Sarasota Reds. The Pirates moved the team to Bradenton, where they were renamed the Bradenton Marauders. The Marauders became the first Florida State League team located in Bradenton since the Bradenton Growers folded in 1926.

== Logos and uniforms ==
The Sarasota teams' names, logos and team colors were all closely associated with each's parent club. For example, the logos for Sarasota White Sox, Red Sox and Reds were just slightly altered versions of the parent club logos. However, there were attempts to allow some of these teams to find their own unique identities. In 2000, the Sarasota Red Sox introduced their mascot Gordy the Gecko. The Red Sox front office felt that since the team was based in Florida, its mascot should be reflective to the area. Soon Gordy found his way on to the team's caps as an alternate logo.

== Season-by-season record ==
Sarasota White Sox (Florida State League)
Year	Regular Season			Postseason
Year	Record	Win %	Finish*	Result
1989	79–57	.581	1st FSL West	Lost in 1st round
1990	63–75	.457	3rd FSL West	Did not qualify
1991	75–56	.573	2nd FSL West	Lost in 1st round
1992	50–19	.725	1st FSL West	Lost in 1st round
1993	77–57	.575	2nd FSL West	Did not Qualify
Totals	344–264	–	–	0 FSL Championships
Sarasota Red Sox (Florida State League)
Year	Regular Season			Postseason
Year	Record	Win %	Finish*	Result
1994	69–64	.519	5th FSL West	Did not Qualify
1995	65–68	.489	5th FSL West	Did not Qualify
1996	67–69	.493	6th FSL West	Did not Qualify
1997	63–76	.453	7th FSL West	Did not Qualify
1998	76–61	.555	4th FSL West	Did not Qualify
1999	67–72	.482	6th FSL West	Did not Qualify
2000	60–79	.432	?th FSL West	Did not Qualify
2001	54–83	.394	6th FSL West	Did not Qualify
2002	62–74	.456	5th FSL West	Did not Qualify
2003	63–67	.485	5th FSL West	Did not Qualify
2004	75–61	.551	2nd FSL West	Did not Qualify
Totals	721–764	–	–	0 FSL Championships
Sarasota Reds (Florida State League)
Year	Regular Season			Postseason
Year	Record	Win %	Finish*	Result
2005	65–67	.492	9th FSL West	Did not Qualify
2006	66–73	.475	6th FSL West	Did not Qualify
2007	81–59	.579	3rd FSL West	Lost in semi-finals
2008	60–78	.435	6th FSL West	Did not Qualify
2009	54–83	.394	6th FSL West	Did not Qualify
Totals	326–360	–	–	0 FSL Championships

== Notable alumni ==
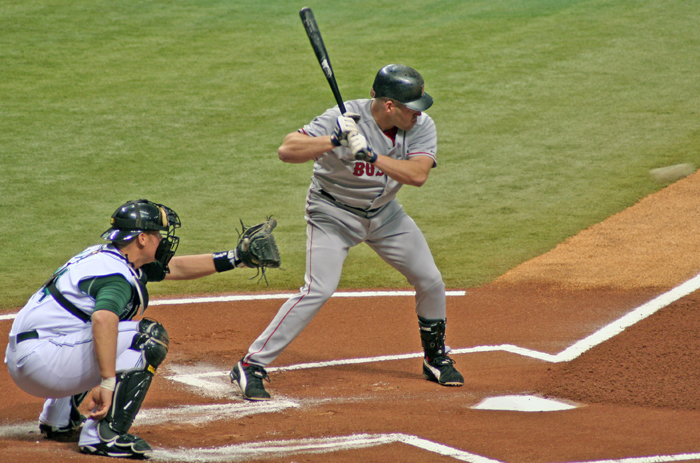
Kevin Youkilis, 2002 Sarasota Red Sox alumnus

- Former White Sox players
- Former Red Sox players
- Former Reds players
