= Payne Park =

Former baseball field

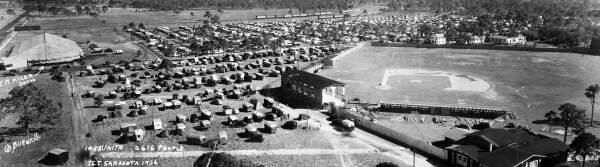
- Payne Park in 1936
- Interactive map of Payne Park
- Address: 2050 Adams Lane
- Location: Sarasota, Florida
- Coordinates: 27°20′03″N 82°31′45″W
- Owner: City of Sarasota
- Type: Stadium
- Event: Baseball
- Surface: Grass
- Scoreboard: Yes
- Field size: 1924–1962; Left field – 375 ft (114 m); Center field – 500 ft (150 m); Right field – 375 ft (114 m); 1963–1990 (Final); Left field – 352 ft (107 m); Center field – 415 ft (126 m); Right field – 352 ft (107 m)
- Acreage: 29
- Public transit: Sarasota County Area Transit

Construction
- Groundbreaking: October 18, 1923
- Opened: February 1, 1924
- Renovated: 1950, 1962
- Expanded: 1962
- Closed: April 1988
- Demolished: November 1990
- Cost: $18,000 ($257,248 in 2024 dollars)

Tenants
- New York Giants (NL); Sarasota Gulls (FSL); Sarasota Tarpons (FSL); Indianapolis Indians (AA); Boston Red Sox (AL); Los Angeles Dodgers (NL); Chicago White Sox (AL); Sarasota Sun Sox (FSL); Sarasota White Sox (FSL): 1924–1927; 1926; 1927; 1929–1932; 1933–1942; 1946–1958; 1959; 1960–1988; 1961–1965; 1989

Payne Park is a former baseball field from 1924 to 1990 in Sarasota, Florida. The stadium and field were built on a portion of 60 acres (0.24 km^{2}) of land donated by Calvin Payne and his wife, Martha in 1923. Payne Park today is a 29-acre (0.12 km^{2}) public park used for recreational events.

== History ==
=== Ballpark ===
The ballpark was erected in 1924 and was a long time spring training and minor league site for baseball clubs such as the Boston Red Sox, Chicago White Sox and the New York Giants. The Los Angeles Dodgers played their home spring training games at Payne Park in 1959.

The park ceased its association with professional baseball in 1989 with the construction of Ed Smith Stadium and the ballpark was demolished. Until 1963, the ballpark's dimensions were 375 feet (114 m) down the foul-lines and 500 feet (150 m) to center-field.

The ballpark was refurbished on multiple occasions. Prior to Spring Training 1951, the City of Sarasota added 600 permanent bleachers, increasing capacity to just over 4,000. The size of the press-box was doubled as well.

Norman Rockwell's 1957 painting The Rookie is set in the Red Sox' spring training locker room, which at the time was located at Payne Park.

The White Sox moved their spring training games from Tampa to Sarasota in 1960. Prior to spring training 1963, The City of Sarasota changed the ballpark's dimensions to 352 feet (107 m) down the foul-lines and 415 feet (126 m) to center field to match the White Sox' Comiskey Park dimensions.

Payne Park was the one of several host venues for the 1974 Amateur World Series, the first and only edition of the tournament (later renamed the Baseball World Cup) to be held in the United States.

The Chicago White Sox and Texas Rangers played the last major league spring training game at Payne Park on March 30, 1988. The Sarasota White Sox began play in 1989 at Payne Park until its demolition in November 1990.

=== Public park ===
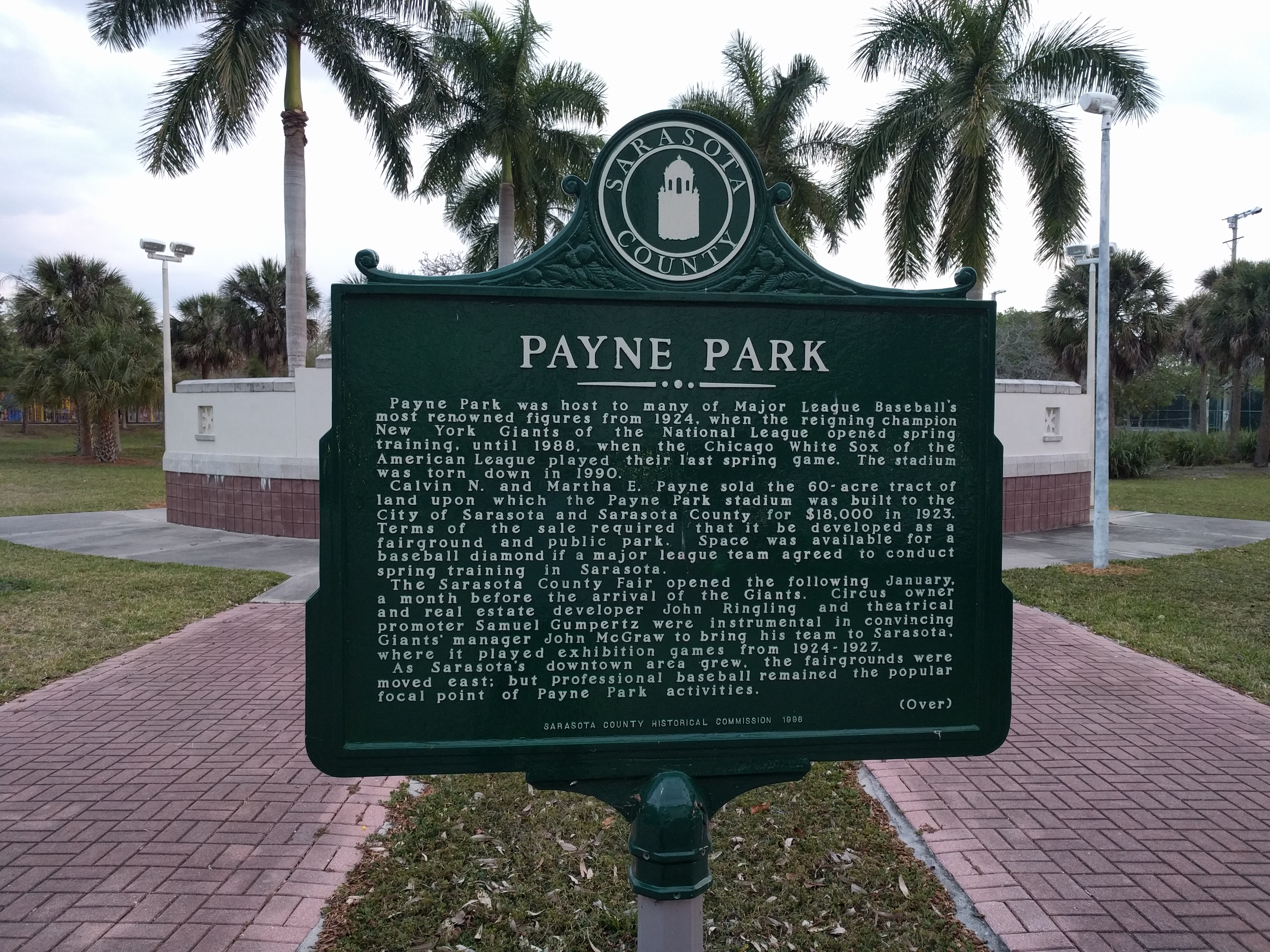
Historical marker located at former stadium location

The City of Sarasota reopened the former ballpark-site as Payne Park on October 6, 2007 as a 29-acre (0.12 km^{2}) public park space. The public park was built at a cost of $8.8 million, funded by a county-wide penny surtax.

It features a public skateboard park, Frisbee golf course, tracks for walking and riding bikes, lakes, and a cafe serving lunches and refreshments. In 2012, the city opened expansion to the park including a circus playground featuring a small waterpark on site.
