= List of Major League Baseball spring training ballparks =

The following is a list of current and former Major League Baseball spring training ballparks.

== Current ballparks ==
=== Grapefruit League (Florida) ===
Stadium name	Opened	City	Capacity	Current occupants	Former occupants
BayCare Ballpark	2004	Clearwater	8,500	Philadelphia Phillies (2004–present)	
Charlotte Sports Park	1988	Port Charlotte	7,000	Tampa Bay Rays (2009–present)	Texas Rangers (1988–2002)
Clover Park	1988	Port St. Lucie	7,160	New York Mets (1988–present)	
CoolToday Park	2019	North Port	8,000	Atlanta Braves (2019–present)	
Ed Smith Stadium	1989	Sarasota	7,500	Baltimore Orioles (1991, 2010–present)	Chicago White Sox (1989–1997); Cincinnati Reds (1998–2009)
CACTI Park of the Palm Beaches	2017	West Palm Beach	6,500 (Note: does not include berm seating for 1000)	Houston Astros (2017–present); Washington Nationals (2017–present)	
George M. Steinbrenner Field	1996	Tampa	11,000	New York Yankees (1996–present)	
Hammond Stadium	1991	Fort Myers	9,300	Minnesota Twins (1991–present)	
JetBlue Park at Fenway South	2012	Fort Myers	10,800	Boston Red Sox (2012–present)	
LECOM Park	1923	Bradenton	8,500	Pittsburgh Pirates (1969–present)	St. Louis Cardinals (1923–24, 1930–36); Philadelphia Phillies (1925–27); Boston Red Sox (1928–29); Boston Bees/Braves/Milwaukee Braves (1938–40, 1948–62); Kansas City/Oakland Athletics (1963–68)
Publix Field at Joker Marchant Stadium	1966	Lakeland	8,500	Detroit Tigers (1966–present)	
Roger Dean Chevrolet Stadium	1998	Jupiter	6,871	Florida/Miami Marlins (2002–present); St. Louis Cardinals (1998–present)	Montreal Expos (1998–2001)
TD Ballpark	1990	Dunedin	8,500	Toronto Blue Jays (1990–present)	

=== Cactus League (Arizona) ===
Stadium name	Opened	City	Capacity	Current occupants	Former occupants
American Family Fields of Phoenix	1998	Phoenix	10,000	Milwaukee Brewers (1998–present)	
Camelback Ranch-Glendale	2009	Glendale	13,000	Chicago White Sox (2009–present); Los Angeles Dodgers (2009–present)	
Goodyear Ballpark	2009	Goodyear	10,000	Cincinnati Reds (2010–present); Cleveland Indians/Guardians (2009–present)	
Hohokam Stadium	1997	Mesa	12,500	Athletics (2015–present)	Chicago Cubs (1997–2013)
Peoria Sports Complex	1994	Peoria	12,882	San Diego Padres (1994–present); Seattle Mariners (1994–present)	
Salt River Fields at Talking Stick	2011	Salt River Pima–Maricopa Indian Community	11,000	Arizona Diamondbacks (2011–present); Colorado Rockies (2011–present)	
Scottsdale Stadium (new)	1992	Scottsdale	12,000	San Francisco Giants (1992–present)	
Sloan Park	2014	Mesa	15,000	Chicago Cubs (2014–present)	
Surprise Stadium	2003	Surprise	10,500	Kansas City Royals (2003–present); Texas Rangers (2003–present)	
Tempe Diablo Stadium	1969	Tempe	9,785	Los Angeles Angels (1993–present)	Seattle Pilots/Milwaukee Brewers (1969–72); Seattle Mariners (1977–93)

== Formerly used ballparks ==
Stadium name	Opened	Closed/Last used for Spring training	City	Capacity (at closing)	Occupants	Status
Al Lang Field	1947	2008	St. Petersburg, Florida	7,227	New York Yankees (1947–50, 1952–61); New York Giants (1951); St. Louis Cardinals (1947–97); New York Mets (1962–87) (Note: Used Huggins-Stengel Field for practices); Baltimore Orioles (1991–95); Tampa Bay Devil Rays/Rays (1998–2008)	Still standing
Al López Field	1955	1988	Tampa, Florida		Chicago White Sox (1955–59); Cincinnati Reds (1960–87)	Demolished (became Raymond James Stadium)
Alex Box Stadium (a.k.a. LSU Varsity Baseball Field)	1938	2008	Baton Rouge, Louisiana	7,760	New York Giants (1938–1939)	Demolished (became part of new Alex Box Stadium)
Bader Park	1944	1998	Atlantic City, New Jersey	4,000	New York Yankees (1944–45); Boston Red Sox (1945)	Demolished (became The Sandcastle)
Ban Johnson Park (a.k.a. Whittington Park)	1894	1947	Hot Springs, Arkansas	2,000	Sioux City Cornhuskers (1894–1900); Cleveland Spiders (1889–1890); St. Louis Cardinals (1900); Pittsburgh Pirates (1901–1914, 1920–1923); Detroit Tigers (1908); Brooklyn Dodgers (1917); Boston Red Sox (1920–1923)	Demolished (became a parking lot for Weyerhaeuser)
Baseball City Stadium	1988	2005	Davenport, Florida	8,000	Kansas City Royals (1988–2002)	Demolished (became Posner Park)
Blair Field	1958	1966	Long Beach, California	3,283	Chicago Cubs (1966)	Still standing
Bosse Field	1915	1945	Evansville, Indiana	5,181	Detroit Tigers (1943–45)	Still standing
Chain of Lakes Park	1966	2008	Winter Haven, Florida	7,000	Boston Red Sox (1966–92); Cleveland Indians (1993–2008)	Still standing
Champion Stadium	1997	2019	Bay Lake, Florida	9,500	Atlanta Braves (1997–2019)	Still standing
City of Palms Park	1993	2011	Fort Myers, Florida	8,000	Boston Red Sox (1993–2011)	Still standing. Currently leased to Florida SouthWestern State College
Clearwater Athletic Field	1923	1954	Clearwater, Florida	3,000	Brooklyn Dodgers (1923–32, 1936–41); Cleveland Indians (1942, 1946); Philadelphia Phillies (1947–54)	Demolished (became Jack Russell Stadium)
Cocoa Expo Sports Center	1964	1993	Cocoa, Florida	5,000	Houston Colt .45s/Astros (1964–1984); Florida Marlins (1993)	Still standing
Coffee Pot Park (a.k.a. Sunshine Park)	1914	1928	St. Petersburg, Florida	850	St. Louis Browns (1914); Philadelphia Phillies (1915–18)	Demolished (became private housing)
Connie Mack Field	1924	1992	West Palm Beach, Florida	3,500	St. Louis Browns (1928–36); Philadelphia Athletics/Kansas City Athletics (1946–62)	Demolished (became parking garage for Kravis Center)
Compadre Stadium	1986	1997	Chandler, Arizona		Milwaukee Brewers (1986–1997)	Demolished
Cooke Field		1924	Leesburg, Florida		Philadelphia Phillies (1922–1924)	Demolished (became Cutrale Citrus plant)
Desert Sun Stadium	1970	1993	Yuma, Arizona	10,500	San Diego Padres (1969–93)	Still standing
Denison Field	1928	1940	Winter Haven, Florida	unknown	Philadelphia Phillies (1928–1938); New York Giants(1940)	Rebuilt in 1947 as high school football field, Denison Stadium
Estadio Latinoamericano (a.k.a. Gran Estadio de la Habana)	1946	1953	Havana, Cuba	30,000	Brooklyn Dodgers (1947); Pittsburgh Pirates (1953)	Still standing
Estadio Sixto Escobar	1935	1936	San Juan, Puerto Rico	18,000	Cincinnati Reds (1936)	Still standing
Fiscalini Field (a.k.a. Perris Hill Park)	1934	1953	San Bernardino, California	3,500	Pittsburgh Pirates (1935, 1937–42, 1946, 1949–52); St. Louis Browns (1948, 1953)	Still standing
Flamingo Field	1934	1947	Miami Beach, Florida	3,000	New York Giants (1934–35); Philadelphia Phillies (1940–42, 1946); Pittsburgh Pirates (1947)	Still standing
Fogel Field (a.k.a. Fordyce Field)	1912	1926	Hot Springs, Arkansas		Philadelphia Phillies (1912); Pittsburgh Pirates (1921–23, 1926)	Grass field still exists at the site and is used by the Arkansas Alligator Farm for overflow parking
Fort Lauderdale Stadium	1962	2009	Fort Lauderdale, Florida	8,340	New York Yankees (1962–95); Baltimore Orioles (1996–2009)	Demolished
Francisco Grande	1961	1983	Casa Grande, Arizona	unknown	San Francisco Giants (1961–81); California Angels (1982–83)	Demolished
Gilmore Field	1939	1957	Hollywood, California	12,987	Pittsburgh Pirates (1948)	Demolished (became CBS Television City)
Grant Field	1930	1989	Dunedin, Florida	3,417	Toronto Blue Jays (1977–89)	Demolished (became Dunedin Stadium)
Henley Field Ball Park	1923		Lakeland, Florida	1,000	Cleveland Indians (1924–27); Detroit Tigers (1934–42, 1946–65); Lakeland Flying Tigers (2016)	Still Standing; Used by the Lakeland Flyer Tigers a minor league team of the Detroit Tigers for the 2016 season while their home facility Joker Marchant Stadium was being renovated.
Herald Park	1884	1904	Houston, Texas		Louisville Colonels (1895); St. Louis Cardinals (1904)	Demolished (became commercial space)
HoHoKam Park (1977)	1977	1996	Mesa, Arizona		Chicago Cubs (1979–96); Oakland Athletics (1977–78)	Replaced by HoHoKam Stadium on same site
Holman Stadium	1953	2008	Vero Beach, Florida	6,500	Brooklyn/Los Angeles Dodgers (1953–2008)	Still standing
Hi Corbett Field	1937	2010	Tucson, Arizona	9,500	Colorado Rockies (1993–2010); Cleveland Indians (1947–1992)	Still standing; now used by the University of Arizona
J. P. Small Memorial Stadium (a.k.a. Barrs Field)	1912	1922	Jacksonville, Florida		Philadelphia Athletics (1914–18); Pittsburgh Pirates (1918); New York Yankees (1919–20); Brooklyn Dodgers (1919–20, 1922)	Still standing
Jackie Robinson Ballpark (a.k.a. City Island Ball Park)	1914	1980	Daytona Beach, Florida	4,200	St. Louis Cardinals (1925–37); Brooklyn Dodgers (1946); Baltimore Orioles (1955); Montreal Expos (1973–80)	Still standing
Jack Russell Memorial Stadium (a.k.a. Jack Russell Stadium)	1955	2003	Clearwater, Florida	6,942	Philadelphia Phillies (1955–2003)	Still standing
Jaycee Park	1954	1954	Fort Pierce, Florida	5,000	Pittsburgh Pirates (1954)	Demolished (became city's police headquarters)
La Palma Park	1939	1946	Anaheim, California	700	Philadelphia Athletics (1940-1942); St. Louis Browns (1946)	Still standing
McCulloch Park	1943	1945	Muncie, Indiana	4,100	Pittsburgh Pirates (1943–1945)	Destroyed by fire Community park still standing
Miami Stadium (a.k.a. Bobby Maduro Miami Stadium)	1949	1990	Miami, Florida	13,000	Baltimore Orioles (1959–1990); Brooklyn/Los Angeles Dodgers (1950–1958)	Demolished (became apartments)
Osceola County Stadium	1984	2016	Kissimmee, Florida	5,300	Houston Astros (1985-2016)	Still standing
Palm Springs Stadium	1949	1992	Palm Springs, California	5,185	Chicago White Sox (1951–53); Los Angeles/California Angels (1961–92)	Still standing
Phoenix Municipal Stadium	1964	2014	Phoenix, Arizona	8,775	San Francisco Giants (1964-81); Oakland Athletics (1982–2014)	Still standing, now used by Arizona State University
Pompano Beach Municipal Park	1957	1986	Pompano Beach, Florida	4,500	Washington Senators/Texas Rangers (1961–86)	Still standing
Payne Park	1924	1990	Sarasota, Florida		New York Giants (1924–27); Boston Red Sox (1933–42, 1946–58); Chicago White Sox (1960–88)	Demolished (became public park of same name)
Pelican Stadium (a.k.a. Heinemann Park)	1915	1957	New Orleans		Brooklyn Dodgers (1921); New York Yankees (1922–1924)	Demolished (became Fountainbleau Hotel)
Plant City Stadium	1988	1997	Plant City, Florida	6,000	Cincinnati Reds (1988–97)	Still standing
Plant Field	1899	2002	Tampa, Florida		Chicago Cubs (1913–16); Boston Red Sox (1919); Washington Senators (1920–29); Detroit Tigers (1930); Cincinnati Reds (1930–59); Chicago White Sox (1954)	Demolished (became building on University of Tampa campus)
Recreation Park	1907	1930	San Francisco	15,000	Chicago White Sox (1909–10)	Demolished (became public housing)
Rendezvous Park	1952	1976	Mesa, Arizona		Chicago Cubs (1952–1965); Oakland Athletics (1969–1976)	Demolished (Became part of civic center, Mesa amphitheater)
Rickwood Field	1910	1920	Birmingham, Alabama	10,800	Philadelphia Phillies (1911, 1920); Pittsburgh Pirates (1919)	Still standing
Riverside Park	1914	1935	Dawson Springs, Kentucky		Pittsburgh Pirates (1915–17)	Demolished (rebuilt in 1999)
Riverside Sports Complex	1950	1959	Riverside, California		Cincinnati Reds (1950s)	Still standing
Santaluces Athletic Complex	1969		Lake Worth, Florida	unknown	Montreal Expos	became Santaluces High School and Athletic Complex
Scottsdale Stadium (old)	1956	1991	Scottsdale	4,721 (in 1984)	Baltimore Orioles (1956-1958); Boston Red Sox (1959-1965); Chicago Cubs (1967-1978); Oakland Athletics (1979-1983); San Francisco Giants (1984–1991)	Rebuilt
Space Coast Stadium	1994	2016	Viera, Florida	8,100	Montreal Expos/ Washington Nationals (2003–2016); Florida Marlins (1994–2002)	Still standing
Sun City Stadium	1971	1985	Sun City, Arizona	5,500	Milwaukee Brewers (1973–1985)	Demolished (became part of condo tract)
Tech Field	1921	1941	San Antonio, Texas		Pittsburgh Pirates (1936); St. Louis Browns (1937–1941)	Demolished
Terry Park Ballfield	1925	1987	Fort Myers, Florida	3,000	Philadelphia Athletics (1925–36); Cleveland Indians (1941–42); Pittsburgh Pirates (1955–68); Kansas City Royals (1969–87)	Still standing. Now renamed Park T. Pigott Memorial Stadium Added to the National Register of Historic Places on May 11, 1995.
Tinker Field	1914	1990	Orlando, Florida	5,100	Cincinnati Reds (1923–33); Brooklyn Dodgers (1934–35); Washington Senators/ Minnesota Twins (1936–42, 1946–90)	Demolished (field still standing)
Tucson Electric Park	1998	2010	Tucson, Arizona	11,500	Arizona Diamondbacks (1998–2010); Chicago White Sox (1998–2008)	Still standing
Waterfront Park	1922	1947	St. Petersburg, Florida		Boston Braves (1922–37); New York Yankees (1925–42, 1946–47); St. Louis Cardinals (1938–42, 1946–47)	Demolished (part became Al Lang Field)
West End Park	1905	1945	Houston, Texas	2,500	St. Louis Cardinals (1906–1908); St. Louis Browns (1909–1910, 1915); New York Yankees (1914)	Demolished (became part of Interstate 45)
West Palm Beach Municipal Stadium	1963	1997	West Palm Beach, Florida	5,000	Milwaukee/Atlanta Braves (1963–97); Montreal Expos (1969–72, 1981–97)	Demolished (became parking lot for Home Depot)
Wilmington Park	1940	1963	Wilmington, Delaware	7,000	Philadelphia Athletics (1943); Philadelphia Phillies (1944–45)	Demolished
Wrigley Field	1922	1966	Avalon, California		Chicago Cubs (1921–41, 1946–51)	Demolished (became part of Catalina Country Club)

== Current cities ==
=== Grapefruit League (Florida) ===
City	Current team(s)	Current ballpark(s)	Capacity	Former team(s)
Bradenton	Pittsburgh Pirates (1969–present)	LECOM Park	6,602	St. Louis Cardinals (1923–24); Philadelphia Phillies (1925–27); Boston Red Sox (1928–29); Boston Braves/Milwaukee Braves (1928–40, 1948–61); Kansas City/Oakland Athletics (1963–68)
Clearwater	Philadelphia Phillies (1947–present)	BayCare Ballpark	8,500	Brooklyn Dodgers (1923–32, 1936–41); Cleveland Indians (1942, 1946)
Dunedin	Toronto Blue Jays (1977–present)	TD Ballpark	8,500	
Fort Myers	Boston Red Sox (1992–present)	JetBlue Park	11,000	
Fort Myers	Minnesota Twins (1991–present)	Hammond Stadium	7,500	Philadelphia Athletics (1925–36); Cleveland Indians (1941–42); Pittsburgh Pirates (1955–68); Kansas City Royals (1969–87)
Jupiter	Miami Marlins (2002–present); St. Louis Cardinals (1998–present)	Roger Dean Stadium	6,871	Montreal Expos (1998–2001)
North Port	Atlanta Braves (2019–present)	CoolToday Park	8,000	
Lakeland	Detroit Tigers (1934–42, 1946–present)	Joker Marchant Stadium	8,500	Cleveland Indians (1924–27)
Port Charlotte	Tampa Bay Rays (2009–present)	Charlotte Sports Park	7,000	Texas Rangers (1998–2002)
Port St. Lucie	New York Mets (1988–present)	Clover Park	7,347	
Sarasota	Baltimore Orioles (1991, 2010–present)	Ed Smith Stadium	7,500	New York Giants (1924–27); Boston Red Sox (1933–42, 1946–58); Chicago White Sox (1960–97); Cincinnati Reds (1998–2009)
Tampa	New York Yankees (1996–present)	George M. Steinbrenner Field	10,000	Chicago Cubs (1913–16); Boston Red Sox (1919); Washington Senators (1920–29); Detroit Tigers (1930); Cincinnati Reds (1930–87); Chicago White Sox (1954–59)
West Palm Beach	Washington Nationals (2017–present); Houston Astros (2017–present)	The Ballpark of The Palm Beaches	7,600	Milwaukee Braves/Atlanta Braves (1963–1997); Montreal Expos (1969-1972, 1981–1997)

=== Cactus League (Arizona) ===
City	Current team(s)	Current ballpark(s)	Capacity	Former team(s)
Glendale	Chicago White Sox (2009–present); Los Angeles Dodgers (2009–present)	Camelback Ranch	13,000	
Goodyear	Cincinnati Reds (2010–present); Cleveland Guardians (2009–present)	Goodyear Ballpark	10,000	
Mesa	Chicago Cubs (2014–present)	Sloan Park	15,000	
Mesa	Athletics (2015–present)	HoHoKam Stadium	12,623	Chicago Cubs (1997-2013)
Peoria	San Diego Padres (1994–present); Seattle Mariners (1994–present)	Peoria Sports Complex	12,882	
Phoenix	Milwaukee Brewers (1998–present)	American Family Fields of Phoenix	10,000	
Scottsdale	San Francisco Giants (1992–present)	Scottsdale Stadium	12,000	
Scottsdale	Arizona Diamondbacks (2011–present); Colorado Rockies (2011–present)	Salt River Fields at Talking Stick	11,000	
Surprise	Kansas City Royals (2003–present); Texas Rangers (2003–present)	Surprise Stadium	10,500	
Tempe	Los Angeles Angels (1993–present)	Tempe Diablo Stadium	9,785	Seattle Pilots/Milwaukee Brewers (1969–72); Seattle Mariners (1977–93)

== See also ==
- List of MLB stadiums
- Lists of baseball parks
