= List of Kansas City Royals minor league affiliates =

Current Kansas City Royals domestic minor league affiliate locations

The Kansas City Royals farm system consists of seven Minor League Baseball affiliates across the United States and in the Dominican Republic. Four teams are independently owned, while three—the Arizona Complex League Royals and two Dominican Summer League Royals teams—are owned by the major league club.

The Royals have been affiliated with the Triple-A Omaha Storm Chasers of the Pacific Coast League since 1969, making it the longest-running affiliation in the organization. Their newest affiliates are the High-A Quad Cities River Bandits of the Midwest League and the Single-A Columbia Fireflies of the Carolina League, which became Royals affiliates in 2021.

Geographically, Kansas City's closest domestic affiliate is the Omaha Storm Chasers, which are approximately 169 miles (272 km) away. Kansas City's furthest domestic affiliate is the Rookie Arizona Complex League Royals some 1,057 miles (1,701 km) away.

== Current affiliates ==
The Kansas City Royals farm system consists of seven minor league affiliates.

Class	Team	League	Location	Ballpark	Affiliated
Triple-A	Omaha Storm Chasers	International League	Papillion, Nebraska	Werner Park	1969
Double-A	Northwest Arkansas Naturals	Texas League	Springdale, Arkansas	Arvest Ballpark	2008
High-A	Quad Cities River Bandits	Midwest League	Davenport, Iowa	Modern Woodmen Park	2021
Single-A	Columbia Fireflies	Carolina League	Columbia, South Carolina	Segra Park	2021
Rookie	ACL Royals	Arizona Complex League	Surprise, Arizona	Surprise Stadium	2024
Rookie	DSL Royals Fortuna	Dominican Summer League	Boca Chica, Santo Domingo	Kansas City Royals Complex	2024
Rookie	DSL Royals Ventura	Dominican Summer League	Boca Chica, Santo Domingo	Kansas City Royals Complex	2024

== Past affiliates ==
=== Key ===
Season	Each year is linked to an article about that particular Roylas season.
†	League champions

=== 1968–1989 ===
Prior to the 1963 season, Major League Baseball (MLB) initiated a reorganization of Minor League Baseball that resulted in a reduction from six classes to four (Triple-A, Double-A, Class A, and Rookie) in response to the general decline of the minors throughout the 1950s and early-1960s when leagues and teams folded due to shrinking attendance caused by baseball fans' preference for staying at home to watch MLB games on television. The only change made within the next 27 years was Class A being subdivided for the first time to form Class A Short Season in 1966.

Season	Triple-A	Double-A	Class A	Class A Short Season	Rookie	Ref(s).
1968	—	—	Dubuque Royals; High Point-Thomasville Hi-Toms^{†}	Corning Royals	—	
1969	Omaha Royals^{†}	Elmira Pioneers (Note: In 1969 and 1970, the Royals shared the Double-A Elmira Pioneers with the San Diego Padres.)	High Point-Thomasville Royals; Waterloo Hawks	Corning Royals; Winnipeg Goldeyes	Kingsport Royals	
1970	Omaha Royals^{†}	Elmira Pioneers	San Jose Bees; Waterloo Royals	—	Billings Mustangs; Kingsport Royals	
1971	Omaha Royals	Elmira Royals^{†}	San Jose Bees; Waterloo Royals	—	Billings Mustangs; Kingsport Royals; GCL Royals^{†}	
1972	Omaha Royals	Jacksonville Suns	San Jose Bees; Waterloo Royals	—	Billings Mustangs^{†} Kingsport Royals; GCL Royals^{†}	
1973	Omaha Royals	Jacksonville Suns	San Jose Bees; Waterloo Royals	—	Billings Mustangs^{†} Kingsport Royals^{†} GCL Royals	
1974	Omaha Royals	Jacksonville Suns	San Jose Bees; Waterloo Royals	—	GCL Royals; GCL Royals Academy	
1975	Omaha Royals	Jacksonville Suns	Waterloo Royals^{†}	—	GCL Royals	
1976	Omaha Royals	Jacksonville Suns	Waterloo Royals^{†}	—	GCL Royals	
1977	Omaha Royals	Jacksonville Suns	Daytona Beach Islanders	—	GCL Royals	
1978	Omaha Royals^{†}	Jacksonville Suns	Fort Myers Royals	—	GCL Royals	
1979	Omaha Royals	Jacksonville Suns	Fort Myers Royals	—	GCL Royals Blue; GCL Royals Gold	
1980	Omaha Royals	Jacksonville Suns	Charleston Royals; Fort Myers Royals	—	GCL Royals Blue^{†} GCL Royals Gold	
1981	Omaha Royals	Jacksonville Suns	Charleston Royals; Fort Myers Royals	—	GCL Royals Blue; GCL Royals Gold^{†}	
1982	Omaha Royals	Jacksonville Suns	Charleston Royals; Fort Myers Royals	—	Butte Copper Kings; GCL Royals	
1983	Omaha Royals	Jacksonville Suns	Charleston Royals; Fort Myers Royals	—	Butte Copper Kings; GCL Royals	
1984	Omaha Royals	Memphis Chicks	Charleston Royals; Fort Myers Royals	Eugene Emeralds	—	
1985	Omaha Royals	Memphis Chicks	Fort Myers Royals^{†}	Eugene Emeralds	GCL Royals	
1986	Omaha Royals	Memphis Chicks	Fort Myers Royals	Eugene Emeralds	GCL Royals	
1987	Omaha Royals	Memphis Chicks	Appleton Foxes; Fort Myers Royals	Eugene Emeralds	GCL Royals	
1988	Omaha Royals	Memphis Chicks	Appleton Foxes; Baseball City Royals	Eugene Emeralds	GCL Royals	
1989	Omaha Royals	Memphis Chicks	Appleton Foxes; Baseball City Royals	Eugene Emeralds	GCL Royals; DSL Royals	

=== 1990–2020 ===
Minor League Baseball operated with six classes from 1990 to 2020. In 1990, the Class A level was subdivided for a second time with the creation of Class A-Advanced. The Rookie level consisted of domestic and foreign circuits.

Season	Triple-A	Double-A	Class A-Advanced	Class A	Class A Short Season	Rookie	Foreign Rookie	Ref(s).
1990	Omaha Royals^{†}	Memphis Chicks^{†}	Baseball City Royals	Appleton Foxes	Eugene Emeralds	GCL Royals	DSL Royals/Mets	
1991	Omaha Royals	Memphis Chicks	Baseball City Royals	Appleton Foxes	Eugene Emeralds	GCL Royals	DSL Royals/Cubs	
1992	Omaha Royals	Memphis Chicks	Baseball City Royals	Appleton Foxes	Eugene Emeralds	GCL Royals^{†}	DSL Royals/Cubs/Rockies	
1993	Omaha Royals	Memphis Chicks	Wilmington Blue Rocks	Rockford Royals	Eugene Emeralds	GCL Royals	DSL Royals/Rockies	
1994	Omaha Royals	Memphis Chicks	Wilmington Blue Rocks^{†}	Rockford Royals	Eugene Emeralds	GCL Royals	DSL Royals/Rockies	
1995	Omaha Royals	Wichita Wranglers	Wilmington Blue Rocks	Springfield Sultans	Spokane Indians	GCL Royals^{†}	DSL Royals/Rockies	
1996	Omaha Royals	Wichita Wranglers	Wilmington Blue Rocks^{†}	Lansing Lugnuts	Spokane Indians	GCL Royals	DSL Royals/Rockies	
1997	Omaha Royals	Wichita Wranglers	Wilmington Blue Rocks	Lansing Lugnuts^{†}	Spokane Indians	GCL Royals	DSL Royals	
1998	Omaha Royals	Wichita Wranglers	Wilmington Blue Rocks^{†}	Lansing Lugnuts	Spokane Indians	GCL Royals	DSL Royals	
1999	Omaha Golden Spikes	Wichita Wranglers^{†}	Wilmington Blue Rocks^{†}	Charleston Alley Cats	Spokane Indians^{†}	GCL Royals	DSL Royals	
2000	Omaha Golden Spikes	Wichita Wranglers	Wilmington Blue Rocks	Charleston Alley Cats	Spokane Indians	GCL Royals	DSL Royals	
2001	Omaha Golden Spikes	Wichita Wranglers	Wilmington Blue Rocks	Burlington Bees	Spokane Indians	GCL Royals	DSL Royals	
2002	Omaha Royals	Wichita Wranglers	Wilmington Blue Rocks	Burlington Bees	Spokane Indians	GCL Royals	DSL Royals	
2003	Omaha Royals	Wichita Wranglers	Wilmington Blue Rocks	Burlington Bees	—	AZL Royals 1^{†} AZL Royals 2	DSL Royals	
2004	Omaha Royals	Wichita Wranglers	Wilmington Blue Rocks	Burlington Bees	—	Idaho Falls Chukars; AZL Royals	DSL Royals	
2005	Omaha Royals	Wichita Wranglers	High Desert Mavericks	Burlington Bees	—	Idaho Falls Chukars; AZL Royals	DSL Royals	
2006	Omaha Royals	Wichita Wranglers	High Desert Mavericks	Burlington Bees	—	Idaho Falls Chukars; AZL Royals	DSL Royals	
2007	Omaha Royals	Wichita Wranglers	Wilmington Blue Rocks	Burlington Bees	—	Burlington Royals; Idaho Falls Chukars; AZL Royals	DSL Royals	
2008	Omaha Royals	Northwest Arkansas Naturals	Wilmington Blue Rocks	Burlington Bees^{†}	—	Burlington Royals; Idaho Falls Chukars; AZL Royals	DSL Royals	
2009	Omaha Royals	Northwest Arkansas Naturals	Wilmington Blue Rocks	Burlington Bees	—	Burlington Royals; Idaho Falls Chukars; AZL Royals	DSL Royals	
2010	Omaha Royals	Northwest Arkansas Naturals^{†}	Wilmington Blue Rocks	Burlington Bees	—	Burlington Royals; Idaho Falls Chukars; AZL Royals	DSL Royals	
2011	Omaha Storm Chasers^{†}	Northwest Arkansas Naturals	Wilmington Blue Rocks	Kane County Cougars	—	Burlington Royals; Idaho Falls Chukars; AZL Royals	DSL Royals	
2012	Omaha Storm Chasers	Northwest Arkansas Naturals	Wilmington Blue Rocks	Kane County Cougars	—	Burlington Royals; Idaho Falls Chukars; AZL Royals	DSL Royals	
2013	Omaha Storm Chasers^{†}	Northwest Arkansas Naturals	Wilmington Blue Rocks	Lexington Legends	—	Burlington Royals; Idaho Falls Chukars^{†} AZL Royals	DSL Royals	
2014	Omaha Storm Chasers^{†}	Northwest Arkansas Naturals	Wilmington Blue Rocks	Lexington Legends	—	Burlington Royals; Idaho Falls Chukars	DSL Royals	
2015	Omaha Storm Chasers	Northwest Arkansas Naturals	Wilmington Blue Rocks	Lexington Legends	—	Burlington Royals; Idaho Falls Chukars; AZL Royals	DSL Royals	
2016	Omaha Storm Chasers	Northwest Arkansas Naturals	Wilmington Blue Rocks	Lexington Legends	—	Burlington Royals; Idaho Falls Chukars; AZL Royals	DSL Royals	
2017	Omaha Storm Chasers	Northwest Arkansas Naturals	Wilmington Blue Rocks	Lexington Legends	—	Burlington Royals; Idaho Falls Chukars; AZL Royals	DSL Royals	
2018	Omaha Storm Chasers	Northwest Arkansas Naturals	Wilmington Blue Rocks	Lexington Legends^{†}	—	Burlington Royals; Idaho Falls Chukars; AZL Royals	DSL Royals 1 DSL Royals 2	
2019	Omaha Storm Chasers	Northwest Arkansas Naturals	Wilmington Blue Rocks^{†}	Lexington Legends^{†}	—	Burlington Royals; Idaho Falls Chukars^{†} AZL Royals	DSL Royals 1^{†} DSL Royals 2	
2020 (Note: The 2020 Minor League Baseball season was cancelled due to the COVID-19 pandemic.)	Omaha Storm Chasers	Northwest Arkansas Naturals	Wilmington Blue Rocks	Lexington Legends	—	Burlington Royals; Idaho Falls Chukars; AZL Royals	DSL Royals (Note: In 2020, the Royals planned to operate two Dominican Summer League teams but did not announce specific names for each squad.); DSL Royals	

=== 2021–present ===
The current structure of Minor League Baseball is the result of an overall contraction of the system beginning with the 2021 season. Class A was reduced to two levels: High-A and Low-A. Low-A was reclassified as Single-A in 2022.

Season	Triple-A	Double-A	High-A	Single-A	Rookie	Foreign Rookie	Ref.
2021	Omaha Storm Chasers	Northwest Arkansas Naturals^{†}	Quad Cities River Bandits^{†}	Columbia Fireflies	ACL Royals Blue; ACL Royals Gold	DSL Royals Blue; DSL Royals White	
2022	Omaha Storm Chasers	Northwest Arkansas Naturals	Quad Cities River Bandits	Columbia Fireflies	ACL Royals	DSL Royals Glass; DSL Royals Stewart	
2023	Omaha Storm Chasers	Northwest Arkansas Naturals	Quad Cities River Bandits	Columbia Fireflies	ACL Royals	DSL Royals Blue; DSL Royals Gold	
2024	Omaha Storm Chasers^{†}	Northwest Arkansas Naturals	Quad Cities River Bandits	Columbia Fireflies	ACL Royals	DSL Royals Fortuna; DSL Royals Ventura	
2025	Omaha Storm Chasers	Northwest Arkansas Naturals	Quad Cities River Bandits	Columbia Fireflies	ACL Royals	DSL Royals Fortuna; DSL Royals Ventura	
2026	Omaha Storm Chasers	Northwest Arkansas Naturals	Quad Cities River Bandits	Columbia Fireflies	ACL Royals	DSL Royals Fortuna; DSL Royals Ventura	
