= Pedro Grifol =

American baseball player and coach (born 1969)

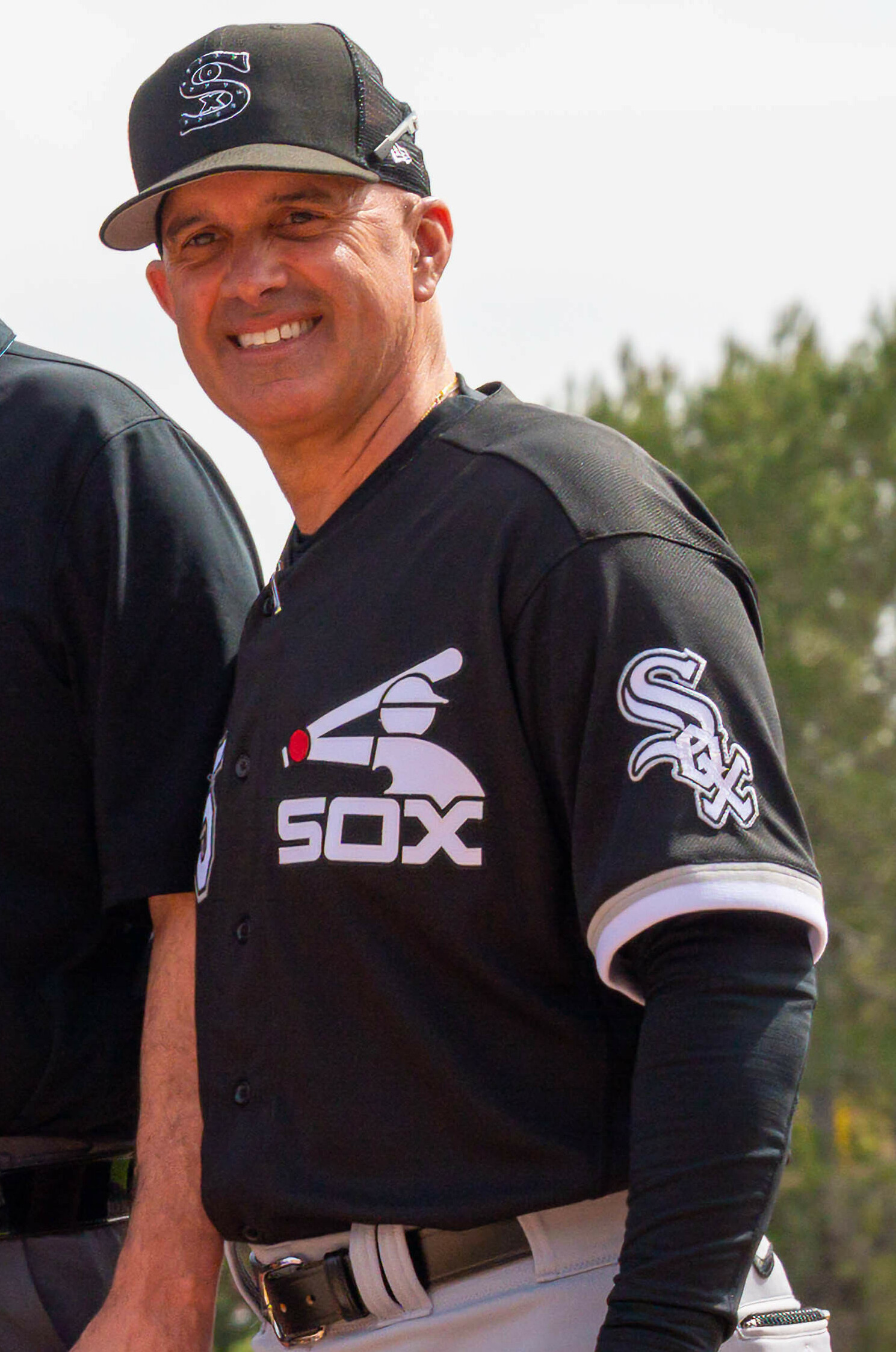
- Grifol with the Chicago White Sox in 2023

FIU Panthers – No. 5
- Catcher / Coach / Manager
- Born: November 28, 1969 (age 56); Miami, Florida, U.S.
- Bats: Right Throws: Right

MLB statistics (through 2024)
- Managerial record: 89–190
- Winning %: .319
- Stats at Baseball Reference

Teams
- As manager: Chicago White Sox (2023–2024); As coach: Kansas City Royals (2013–2022)

Career highlights and awards
- World Series champion (2015)
Medals
Men's baseball
Representing United States
World Junior Baseball Championship
Silver medal – second place	1987 Windsor	Team

Pedro Orlando Grifol (born November 28, 1969) is an American baseball coach and former catcher. He is the former manager for the Chicago White Sox of Major League Baseball (MLB). He also served in various coaching roles for the Kansas City Royals in both their minor league system and at the MLB level.

== Playing career ==
Grifol attended Christopher Columbus High School in Miami, Florida, where he was the Florida high school baseball player of the year in 1988. He attended Florida State University, where he played college baseball for the Florida State Seminoles baseball team. With the Seminoles, Grifol participated in the 1989 and 1991 College World Series. He was named an All-American in 1991. In 1990 and 1991, he played collegiate summer baseball with the Brewster Whitecaps of the Cape Cod Baseball League and was named a league all-star in 1990.

The Minnesota Twins selected Grifol in the sixth round of the 1991 Major League Baseball draft. He played in the minor leagues for the Twins and New York Mets organizations from 1991 to 1999. He worked for the Seattle Mariners as their director of minor league operations.

== Coaching career ==
=== Kansas City Royals ===
Grifol joined the Kansas City Royals organization in 2013 as a minor league coach. He was promoted to the major league staff in May 2013 as an assistant hitting coach. He was moved to be a catching instructor in 2014. In 2015, the Royals won the World Series, their first World Series in 30 years. For the 2020 season, Grifol was named as the Royals bench coach.

=== Chicago White Sox ===
On November 1, 2022, Grifol was hired by the Chicago White Sox to be their 42nd manager. Keynan Middleton criticized the White Sox for having "no rules" after he was traded during the 2023 season. Following a 21-game losing streak, the White Sox fired Grifol on August 8, 2024, after posting a record of 89–190 over two seasons. The 2024 Chicago White Sox that Grifol managed went on to set the record for the most losses in a season by a modern major league team with a record of 41–121.

=== FIU ===
On May 23, 2026, Grifol was named the head coach of the FIU Panthers baseball team.

== Managerial record ==
As of games played on August 7, 2024

Team	Year	Regular season					Postseason			
Team	Year	Games	Won	Lost	Win %	Finish	Won	Lost	Win %	Result
CWS	2023	162	61	101	.377	4th in AL Central	–	–	–	
CWS	2024	117	28	89	.239	Fired	–	–	–	
Total		279	89	190	.319				–	

== Personal life ==
Grifol was born in Miami, Florida, the son of two Cuban immigrants. He and his wife, Ali, have three daughters: Lauren, Amanda, and Camila.
