= Gulf Coast League Royals =

- (1971–1983, 1985–2002); Davenport, Florida (1988–1992, 1999–2002); Fort Myers, Florida (1993–1998); Sarasota, Florida (1971–1983, 1985–1987)

Minor league affiliations
- Previous classes: Rookie
- Previous leagues: Gulf Coast League

Major league affiliations
- Previous teams: Kansas City Royals

Minor league titles
- League titles (6): 1971; 1972; 1980*; 1981**; 1992; 1995; *GCL Royals Blue title; **GCL Royals Gold title
- Division titles (7): 1987; 1988; 1992; 1994; 1995; 1997; 1999

Team data
- Name: GCL Royals (1971–1978, 1982–2002); GCL Royals Blue (1979–1981); GCL Royals Gold (1979–1981); GCL Royals Academy (1974)
- Previous parks: Baseball City Stadium (1988–1992, 1999–2002)

The Gulf Coast League (GCL) Royals were a minor league baseball franchise in the Rookie-level Gulf Coast League from 1971–1978, 1982–1983 and 1985–2002. The club was owned and operated by the Kansas City Royals of Major League Baseball. The GCL Royals played games at Florida-based minor league and spring training facilities located in Sarasota (through 1987), Baseball City Stadium in Davenport (1988–1992; 1999–2002) and Fort Myers (1993–1998).

From 1979–1981, the Royals operated two GCL teams, the Gulf Coast League (GCL) Royals Blue and Gulf Coast League (GCL) Royals Gold, to accommodate a surplus of teenaged players. In 1974, Kansas City also fielded a separate Gulf Coast League (GCL) Royals Academy team for members of its experimental Baseball Academy. The Academy team played alongside the GCL Royals; finishing 35–16 in the GCL standings that season, 4½ games ahead of the 29–19 GCL Royals, but the Royals Academy lost the league pennant by percentage points to the GCL Cubs.

In 2003, when the Royals moved their spring training operations to Surprise, Arizona, they simultaneously transferred their Rookie-level affiliate to the Arizona League.

== Season-by-season ==
Year	Record	Finish	Manager	Playoffs
GCL Royals (1971–1974)
1971	40–13	1st	Buzzy Keller	League Champs; No playoffs until 1983
1972	41–22	1st (t)	Buzzy Keller	Co-Champs w/ GCL Cubs
1973	27–28	5th	Buzzy Keller	
1974	29–19	4th	Billy Scripture	
GCL Royals Academy (1974)
1974	35–16	2nd	Billy Goodman	
GCL Royals (1975–1978)
1975	31–18	2nd	Gary Blaylock	
1976	29–25	3rd	Jose Martinez	
1977	34–19	2nd	Billy Scripture	
1978	31–24	2nd	Jose Martinez	
GCL Royals Blue (1979–1981)
1979	24–29	5th	Brian Murphy	
1980	40–23	1st	Joe Jones	League Champs
1981	35–28	3rd	Joe Jones	
GCL Royals Gold (1979–1981)
1979	29–23	3rd	Jose Martinez	
1980	22–40	9th	Roy Tanner	
1981	44–20	1st	Roy Tanner	League Champs
GCL Royals (1982–2002)
1982	28–35	8th	Joe Jones	
1983	30–31	5th	Joe Jones	
1985	38–24	3rd (t)	Joe Jones	
1986	30–33	8th	Luis Silverio	
1987	40–23	2nd	Luis Silverio	Lost League Finals vs. GCL Dodgers (1 game to 0)
1988	39–24	4th	Carlos Tosca	Lost League Finals vs. GCL Yankees (1 game to 0)
1989	35–28	6th	Carlos Tosca	
1990	25–38	12th	Carlos Tosca	
1991	31–29	5th	Bob Herold	
1992	41–18	1st	Mike Jirschele	League Champs vs. GCL Expos (2 game to 1)
1993	29–30	10th	Bob Herold	
1994	47–12	1st	Bob Herold	Lost League Finals vs. GCL Astros (2 game to 1)
1995	37–20	3rd	Bob Herold	League Champs vs. GCL Tigers (2 game to 0); Won in 1st round vs. GCL White Sox (1 game to 0)
1996	30–29	8th	Al Pedrique	
1997	36–24	3rd	Al Pedrique	Lost in 1st round vs. GCL Rangers (1 game to 0)
1998	32–28	7th	Andre David	
1999	33–27	4th	Andre David	Lost in 1st round vs. GCL Mets (1 game to 0)
2000	20–40	11th	Ron Karkovice / Andre David	
2001	20–40	13th (t)	Lino Diaz	
2002	22–38	14th	Lloyd Simmons	

== Notable alumni ==
- Justin Adam
- Jeremy Affeldt
- Carlos Beltrán
- David Cone
- Johnny Damon
- Chad Durbin
- Carlos Febles
- Rich Gale
- Jimmy Gobble
- Tom Gordon
- Mark Gubicza
- Atlee Hammaker
- Clint Hurdle
- Ramón Martínez
- Ken Phelps
- Hipólito Pichardo
- Glendon Rusch
- Mike Sweeney
- Rodney Williams
- Willie Wilson

== See also ==
- Arizona League Royals
