= Boardwalk and Baseball =

Theme park built in Davenport, Florida

Coordinates: 28.23147°N 81.643234°W

- Previously known as Circus World
- Interactive map of Boardwalk and Baseball
- Location: Davenport, Florida
- Status: Defunct
- Opened: April 1987
- Closed: January 17, 1990
- Owner: Harcourt Brace Jovanovich Park Group (1987–1989); Busch Entertainment Corporation (1989–1990)
- Theme: Baseball nostalgic theme old Coney Island-style
- Operating season: Summer
- Area: 135 acres (55 ha)

Attractions
- Total: 32

Boardwalk and Baseball was a theme park built in Davenport, Florida, at the southeast corner of the Interstate 4-US 27 interchange. It replaced Circus World at the same location, and was owned by Harcourt Brace Jovanovich Park Group (now Harcourt, a division of Houghton Mifflin Harcourt). It opened in April 1987, and closed January 17, 1990.

The park reused many of Circus World's rides and exhibits. The petting zoos were removed, the rides and shows were rethemed, and Baseball City Stadium was built on the site. There were several exhibits that borrowed artifacts from the Baseball Hall of Fame in Cooperstown, New York. HBJ attracted the Kansas City Royals from Fort Myers, Florida, to make Baseball City Stadium their new spring training home and the site of their Class A Florida State League affiliate, the Baseball City Royals. They also had a Rookie-level affiliate in the Gulf Coast League, one of two lowest level minor leagues in the U.S. (along with the Arizona League).

In addition, ESPN taped a quiz bowl-style game show, Boardwalk and Baseball's Super Bowl of Sports Trivia, on the site which aired in 1988 and 1989.

Although the park was considered superior to its predecessor, it was predicted to fail by industry observers at the grand opening. It mostly reused Circus World's relatively standard rides, which were considered no match as a Walt Disney World competitor. Industry observers were proved correct, as the project was quickly falling into financial ruin within 18 months of its grand opening, at which point, employee layoffs and reduced hours were used to try to cut costs. To further limit expenses, the park closed before sunset for almost the entire year, rendering its antique style gas lighting (that cost over $1 million to install) useless.

== History ==
Jim Monaghan sold Circus World for stock to Harcourt Brace Jovanovich on May 10, 1986. Harcourt Brace Jovanovich, which had just bought several parks including the SeaWorld parks and Cypress Gardens, had a new idea for the area, and closed the park at opening time that day to rebuild it into Boardwalk and Baseball. The company expected to have the park open in December 1986. With Circus World's poor reputation, Boardwalk and Baseball was expected by HBJ to restore the park's stature, and would have the expertise available through its purchase of other theme parks, Sea World and Cypress Gardens, the year before. HBJ spent $50 million transforming the park and adding the baseball stadium.

The Class A Florida State League Royal affiliate was purchased by Harcourt Brace Jovanovich in early 1987 with the team to move here.

Boardwalk and Baseball opened in April 1987 with two baseball diamonds. Ted Williams, Don Drysdale, and Mel Allen participated in the opening day festivities. In June, the three HBJ Orlando area parks offered three-day passes with one day at each park, priced below Walt Disney World combo tickets. Baseball City Stadium opened for its first event, the seventh annual Pizza Hut All-Star Softball game, on February 7, 1988 and televised live on NBC. Attendance in 1988 was 1.35 million, but dropped 24% in 1989 to 1.03 million. In August 1989, HBJ put its theme parks up for sale as a group.

=== Decline and closure ===
Harcourt Brace Jovanovich sold its theme park assets (which included SeaWorld and Cypress Gardens) to Busch Entertainment Corporation in September 1989 due to mounting debt, and they closed the park on January 17, 1990. The stadium would continue its operations, while the park and stadium were up for sale. The Kansas City Royals had a spring training contract until 2002 and the Baseball City Royals would also continue regular play at the stadium. With 876 employees at closure, the park was one of Polk County's largest employers. Most of it was demolished except for the stadium and a building that held an IMAX theatre (the very first one at Circus World). The Baseball City Royals (FSL) were sold following the 1992 season and moved to Daytona Beach, Florida, becoming the Daytona Cubs (now the Daytona Tortugas), where they remain to this day. The Gulf Coast League Royals, who had moved at the same time to Ft. Myers, returned in 2000 for their final three years in Florida before being replaced by the Arizona League Royals. The Kansas City Royals moved their spring training home and entire Florida operations department to Surprise, Arizona in 2003. The stadium and theatre were demolished soon afterward.

After sitting idle for over a decade, the site was sold to developer Victor Posner in 2001. Posner Park, a large retail complex with several big box stores, opened on the site in 2008, eliminating the final traces of the long-gone park.

== Attractions ==
- Baseball City Stadium - A ballpark where two daily ballgames were hosted. The Kansas City Royals held their spring training and exhibition games here from 1988 to 2002. The Baseball City Royals, a Kansas City Royals' farm team, was the professional home team. Additional games are by amateurs including high school and college teams. Near the facility was a complex of five baseball fields.
- Batting Cages
- The Big Wheel
- Bullpen
- Bumper Cars
- Carousel
- Dragon Coaster
- Zoomerang (Formerly Double-O) - A shuttle steel looping coaster that was carried over from Circus World. The ride was moved to Fun Spot Park and operated until the park's closure in 2008.
- Enterprise
- Faceball Card Studio - Guests can have their own baseball card printed with pictures taken in any major league jersey
- Fielding test
- Florida Hurricane - A main attraction at the park, this was a wooden coaster and was also carried over from Circus World. The coaster was sold and moved to Magic Springs in Hot Springs, Arkansas.
- Grand Junction Theatre
- Grand Rapid Log Flume - An Arrow Dynamics manufactured log flume with double dips. The ride was moved to SeaWorld San Antonio in 1991 where it operated as Texas Splashdown until 2011.
- 1001 Nights
- Santa Maria
- "Taste of Cooperstown" - An exhibit that displays on loan items from the National Baseball Hall of Fame
- Wave Swinger

== Super Bowl of Sports Trivia ==
Boardwalk and Baseball's Super Bowl of Sports Trivia was a sports trivia show in a College Bowl format taped at a Boardwalk and Baseball studio by Ohlmeyer Communications and broadcast on ESPN from 1988 to 1989.

The show was hosted by Chris Berman and featured single-elimination tournaments of three-person teams representing U.S. colleges and universities. The first season of "Super Bowl of Sports Trivia" was filmed over five days at a studio at the theme park in January 1988. Washington State University won the 1988 tournament.
