= Dawson Springs Resorters =

- 1916; Dawson Springs, Kentucky

Minor league affiliations
- Class: Class D (1916)
- League: Kentucky–Illinois–Tennessee League (1916)

Major league affiliations
- Team: None

Minor league titles
- League titles (0): None

Team data
- Name: Dawson Springs Resorters (1916)
- Ballpark: Riverside Park (1916)

The Dawson Springs Resorters were a minor league baseball team based in Dawson Springs, Kentucky. In 1916, Dawson Springs played as members of the Class D level Kentucky–Illinois–Tennessee League, hosting home games at Riverside Park. The league folded during the 1916 season with Dawson Springs in fourth place.

== History ==
Minor league play in Dawson Springs, Kentucky began in 1916, when the Dawson Springs "Resorters" became members of the six–team Class D level Kentucky–Illinois–Tennessee League, known informally as the KITTY League. The Clarksville Volunteers, Henderson Hens, Hopkinsville Hoppers, Madisonville Miners and Owensboro Distillers teams joined Dawson in beginning KITTY League play on May 20, 1916. The league reformed after not playing in 1915, during World War I.

The Dawson Springs' "Resorters" nickname corresponds to the natural mineral springs in Dawson Springs and local industry in the era. With the attraction of the mineral springs, Dawson Springs hosted spring training for the Pittsburgh Pirates at Riverside Park from 1914 to 1916. Pittsburgh previously held spring training in Hot Springs, Arkansas.

On August 4, 1916, the Kentucky–Illinois–Tennessee League folded after beginning play on May 20, 1916, with Dawson Springs Resorters in fourth place as the league folded. Dawson Springs had a final record of 33–41, playing the season under managers Clyde Goodwin, Louis Eith, Senter Reiney and William Schwartz. Dawson Springs finished 17.0 games behind the first place Clarksville Volunteers, who ended play with a record of 50–24. Dawson Springs finished behind the second place Henderson Hens (44–30) and third place Owensboro Distillers (43–31) and ahead of the Madisonville Miners (31–41) and Hopkinsville Hoppers in the final standings.

When the Kentucky–Illinois–Tennessee League resumed play in 1922, Dawson Springs did not field a franchise. Dawson Springs has not hosted another minor league team.

== The ballpark ==
From 1914 to 1916, Dawson Springs hosted spring training for the Pittsburgh Pirates at Riverside Park, which was reportedly home to the Dawson Springs Resorters. The original wooden ballpark was destroyed by fire in 1930. A new wooden Riverside Park ballpark was constructed in 1999 at the same site and has been used to host local teams. The new ballpark was used as a site in the making of a baseball film. The ballpark location is 901 West Arcadia Avenue in Dawson Springs, Kentucky.

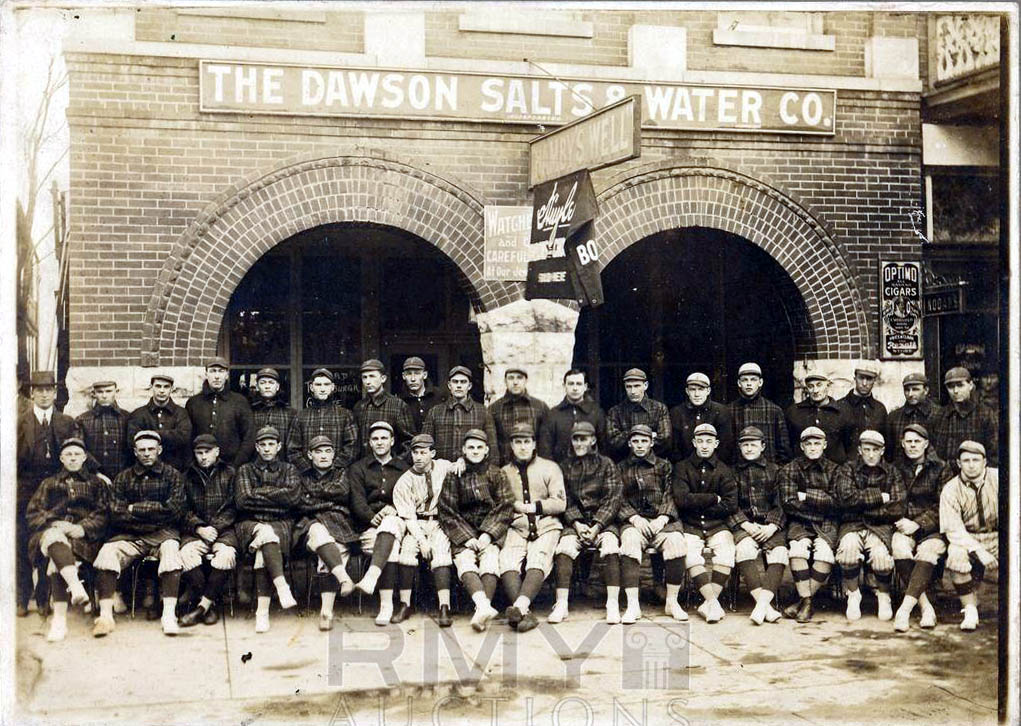
(1913) Pittsburgh Pirates outside the Dawson Salts and Water Co. during Spring Training. Dawson Springs, Kentucky.

== Year–by–year record ==
Year	Record	Finish	Manager	Playoffs/notes
1916	34–41	4th	Clyde Goodwin / Louis Eith; Senter Reiney / William Schwartz	League disbanded August 4

== Notable alumni ==
- Clyde Goodwin (1916, MGR)
