= Terry Park Ballfield =

Historic site in Fort Myers, Florida, US

- Interactive map of Terry Park Ballfield
- Former names: Park T. Pigott Memorial Stadium
- Location: 3410 Palm Beach Boulevard Fort Myers, Florida, United States
- Coordinates: 26.65709°N 81.84199°W
- Operator: Lee County
- Capacity: 600 (1925–1955); 3,000 (1955–2004); 900 (2004–present)
- Surface: Grass; Turf During the Royals Tenure
- Field size: Center Field – 425 ft (130 m)

Construction
- Groundbreaking: 1921
- Opened: 1925
- Renovated: 1955 (Rebuilt)
- Demolished: 1943 by Fire; 2004 by Hurricane
- Cost: US$ 2,100,000 (2010 Renovation Cost)
- Main contractors: Chris-Tel Construction (2010 Renovation)

Tenants
- Major League Baseball spring training: Kansas City Royals (AL) (1969-1987); Pittsburgh Pirates (NL) (1955–1968); Cleveland Indians (AL) (1940-1942); Philadelphia Athletics (AL) (1925-1936) Minor League Baseball spring training: Minnesota Twins (MiLB) (1990); Tampa Smokers (FSL) (1949); Louisville Colonels (AA) (1946); Louisville Colonels (AA) (1914) Minor League Baseball: Fort Myers Royals (FSL) (1978-87); Fort Myers Palms (FSL) (1926) Senior Professional Baseball Association: Fort Myers Sun Sox (SPBA) (1989-90) National Collegiate Athletic Association; Florida Gulf Coast University (ASUN) (2003)
- Terry Park Ballfield
- U.S. National Register of Historic Places
- Location within Florida Location within the United States
- Coordinates: 26.65709°N 81.84199°W
- MPS: Lee County Multiple Property Submission
- NRHP reference No.: 95000730

The Terry Park Ballfield (also known as the Park T. Pigott Memorial Stadium) is a historic site in Fort Myers, Florida, United States. The park is named after the family who donated the land in the 1920s. For years the stadium hosted Major League Baseball spring training, as well as a dozen years of Florida State League baseball. The stadium hosted the Philadelphia Athletics, Cleveland Indians, Pittsburgh Pirates, and Kansas City Royals spring training through the years. Terry Park was also home to some early minor league baseball, most notably the Fort Myers Palms and Fort Myers Royals, both belonging to the Florida State League. Hall of Famers Babe Ruth, Ty Cobb, Roberto Clemente, Jimmy Foxx, Bob Feller, Tris Speaker, and George Brett are some of the notable players who have played at Terry Park Field.

== History ==
In 1921 the local Fort Myers Terry Family donated approximately 25 acres (100,000 m^{2}) of cow pasture to Lee County. Amidst bulls and heifers, a small wooden grandstand seating no more than 600 fans was erected on the site about a mile east of downtown Fort Myers. The stadium was built as a spring training ballpark for Connie Mack's Philadelphia Athletics in 1925. The park was the spring training home of the Philadelphia Athletics from 1925 until 1936, and the Cleveland Indians from 1940 until 1942. It was also the home of the minor league Fort Myers Palms in 1926. The stadium remained in its 1925 condition until 1943, when it was destroyed in a fire. However, in 1955 the park was rebuilt. This time, instead of wood, the stadium was made from steel and concrete.

== Pittsburgh Pirates era ==
The rebuilt Terry Park created an alliance between Fort Myers and the Pittsburgh Pirates. For years the Pirates wandered all over the country for a spring training location and were looking for a permanent spring training home. During a 12-year period the Pirates spent spring training in seven different locations: McCulloch Park in Muncie, Indiana; Flamingo Field in Miami Beach, Gilmore Field in Hollywood, California; Perris Hill Park in San Bernardino; Gran Stadium in Havana, Cuba; and Jaycee Park in Fort Pierce. Terry Park became their spring training home for the next 14 years, before moving to Bradenton's McKechnie Field in 1969.

== Kansas City Royals era ==
In 1968 the Kansas City Athletics moved from Kansas City, Missouri to Oakland, California. This change allowed Kansas City to receive a Major League expansion team. They received their team which was called the Kansas City Royals. Terry Field became the new spring training home for the team. The team's historic first exhibition game was played at Terry Field against the Montreal Expos. The Royals would remain in Fort Myers until 1987. During the Kansas City Royals years, the field featured artificial turf, similar to that of Royals Stadium. However several years after the Royals left for Baseball City, the turf left as well.

In 1988 the Royals left Fort Myers for Haines City. The City open offered the team a new stadium and opened up a theme park called Boardwalk and Baseball which was centered around a baseball theme. The main attraction was going to be the Kansas City Royals spring training home, however the deal later proved to be a bust and by 2002 the park was abandoned and later completely demolished.

=== Fort Myers Royals ===
In 1978 the Kansas City Royals brought a minor league affiliate to Fort Myers, the team being called the Fort Myers Royals a Single A Florida State League franchise. The team played at Terry Field from 1978 until 1987. In 1985 the Royals won the Florida League Championship. Kevin Seitzer and Bret Saberhagen were members of the Fort Myers team and began their professional careers at Terry Park.

== End of professional baseball ==
After the Royals left Fort Myers, a new spring training team was never fielded at the stadium. Two new stadiums were built in Fort Myers, Hammond Stadium was built for the Minnesota Twins and City of Palms Park was built for the Boston Red Sox. The last professional baseball team to call Terry Park home was the Fort Myers Sun Sox of the short lived Senior Professional Baseball Association in 1989 and 1990. The league featured former MLB stars and was played during the winter months. The league folded in 1990. All SPBA playoff games were held at Terry Park, since the league's playoffs occurred during spring training.

In the spring of 1990, the Minnesota Twins minor league teams held their spring training workouts and exhibition games at Terry Park while the new Lee County stadium was being built.

The most recent professional baseball games played at Terry Park Ballfield were held during the 2020 KBO League season, when the Korea Baseball Organization's Kia Tigers with manager Matt Williams hosted spring training games at Terry Park, which was the team's spring training site, which was extended into March by delays.

In 2026, as preparation for the 2026 World Baseball Classic, the Netherlands national baseball team and the Italy national baseball team played each other at Terry Park Ballfield.

== National Register of Historic Places ==
The park pretty much still remained in its 1955 condition. On May 11, 1995, the ball field was placed on the National Register of Historic Places by the United States Department of the Interior. The memorial stadium was dedicated to area resident, Park T. Pigott (1914–1972), in recognition of his lifetime of service, through sports, to the youth of this community. For the 2003 season Terry Park was used by the Eagles of Florida Gulf Coast University while their new ballpark is being built at their Fort Myers campus.

== Terry Park Hall of Famers ==
The following list synthesizes two independent research efforts. The first was completed in 2003 by Gabriel Schechter, Research Associate, National Baseball Hall of Fame and Museum. Schechter identified 80 Hall of Fame inductees using box scores from The Sporting News. The second was completed in 2023 by Ken Breen, a member of the Southwest Florida Historical Society. Breen confirmed an additional 74 Hall of Fame inductees who have been at Terry Park Ballfield. This is documented in a research paper titled Necessarily Incomplete and is updated annually. The list is current through the Class of 2024 and includes 155 names.

=== 1914 ===
Bobby Wallace

=== 1925 ===
Connie Mack, Babe Ruth, Al Simmons, Lefty Grove, Jimmie Foxx, Mickey Cochrane, Bill Terry, Frankie Frisch, Fred Lindstrom, Hack Wilson, Travis Jackson, Billy Southworth

=== 1926 ===
George Kelly, Kenesaw Mountain Landis, John McGraw, Ross Youngs, Al Lopez

=== 1927 ===
Ty Cobb, Eddie Collins, Zach Wheat, Rogers Hornsby, Jim Bottomley, Dave Bancroft

=== 1928 ===
Tris Speaker, Edd Roush, Rabbit Maranville, Mel Ott, Bill McKechnie

=== 1929 ===
Grover Cleveland Alexander, Chuck Klein, Johnny Evers

=== 1930 ===
George Sisler, Leo Durocher

=== 1931 ===
Ernie Lombardi, Wilbert Robinson

=== 1933 ===
Dizzy Dean, Joe Medwick, Bill Klem

=== 1934 ===
Hank Greenberg, Charlie Gehringer, Goose Goslin, Chuck Hafey, Casey Stengel, Tom Yawkey

=== 1935 ===
Joe Cronin

=== 1936 ===
Cal Hubbard

=== 1940 ===
Lou Boudreau, Early Wynn, Bucky Harris

=== 1941 ===
Carl Hubbell, Gabby Hartnett, Johnny Mize, Enos Slaughter, Bob Feller, Bob Lemon, Hal Newhouser

=== 1946 ===
Happy Chandler, Ted Williams, Bobby Doerr

=== 1955 ===
Roberto Clemente, Stan Musial, Hank Aaron, Richie Ashburn, George Kell, Eddie Matthews, Red Schoendienst, Warren Giles, Branch Rickey, Walter Alston, Gil Hodges

=== 1956 ===
Jackie Robinson, Frank Robiinson, Pee Wee Reese, Duke Snider, Harmon Killebrew, Tommy Lasorda, Lefty Gomez, Dick Williams

=== 1957 ===
Bill Mazeroski, Al Kaline, Roy Campanella, Luis Aparicio, Nellie Fox, Larry Doby

=== 1958 ===
Robin Roberts, Whitey Herzog

=== 1959 ===
Jim Bunning, Al Barlick, Sparky Anderson

=== 1960 ===
Brooks Robinson, Pie Traynor, Warren Spahn, Minnie Miñoso, Nester Chylak

=== 1961 ===
Ford Frick, George Weiss, Mickey Mantle, Yogi Berra

=== 1962 ===
Willie Stargell, Paul Waner, Phil Rizzuto, Doug Harvey

=== 1963 ===
Joe Torre, Tony Oliva, Sandy Koufax

=== 1964 ===
Tony Perez, Jim Kaat

=== 1965 ===
Lou Brock, Phil Niekro, Joe Morgan, Don Drysdale, Luke Appling

=== 1966 ===
Carl Yastrzemski, Johnny Bench, Don Sutton, Billy Herman

=== 1967 ===
Catfish Hunter

=== 1968 ===
Hoyt Wilhelm, Reggie Jackson, Tony La Russa

=== 1969 ===
Rod Carew, John Schuerholz, Joe Gordon, Bowie Kuhn

=== 1971 ===
Bert Blyleven, Ted Simmons

=== 1972 ===
Steve Carlton

=== 1973 ===
Mike Schmidt

=== 1974 ===
Jim Palmer, Goose Gossage, Earl Weaver

=== 1975 ===
George Brett, Jim Rice

=== 1977 ===
Eddie Murray

=== 1978 ===
Bobby Cox, Tim Raines

=== 1979 ===
Ferguson Jenkins, Cal Ripken Jr.

=== 1980 ===
Marvin Miller, Jack Morris, Gaylord Perry

=== 1981 ===
Ryne Sandberg, Harold Baines

=== 1982 ===
Andre Dawson, Gary Carter, Wade Boggs, Dennis Eckersley

=== 1983 ===
Dave Winfield

=== 1986 ===
Carlton Fisk, Alan Trammell, Jim Leyland

=== 1987 ===
Ozzie Smith

=== 1990 ===
Rollie Fingers

=== 2006 ===
Paul Molitor

== Hurricane damage ==
In 2004, the stadium was heavily hit by Hurricane Charley with damage from the storm causing the grandstand to be labeled "unsafe". Later in the year, The Board of Lee County Commissioners approved a guaranteed maximum price of $701,697 for Compass Construction to tear down the old grandstand and build a new one. But instead of rebuilding the historic 5,000 seat grandstand, the city replaced it with a small 700 seat structure. This was despite the fact the park was given an official historic marker in 1995. Technically once a grandstand is demolished, the ballpark loses all of its historic significance, regardless of whether it is the same field. Only the old girders have been retained as the outline for a new grandstand which opened in 2005. Therefore, what stands at Terry Park now bears little resemblance to the original historical spring training location it once was. While the new grandstand is covered, it is much smaller and made of metal. Many residents felt it was most unfortunate the county decided not to try to save the classic grandstand. The year 2006 marked the centennial anniversary of Terry Park – at least the playing field portion of it. The new stadium currently seats about 900 people, as the additional bleachers down the foul lines have been removed. A spring training museum is also being considered for the park.

== Today ==
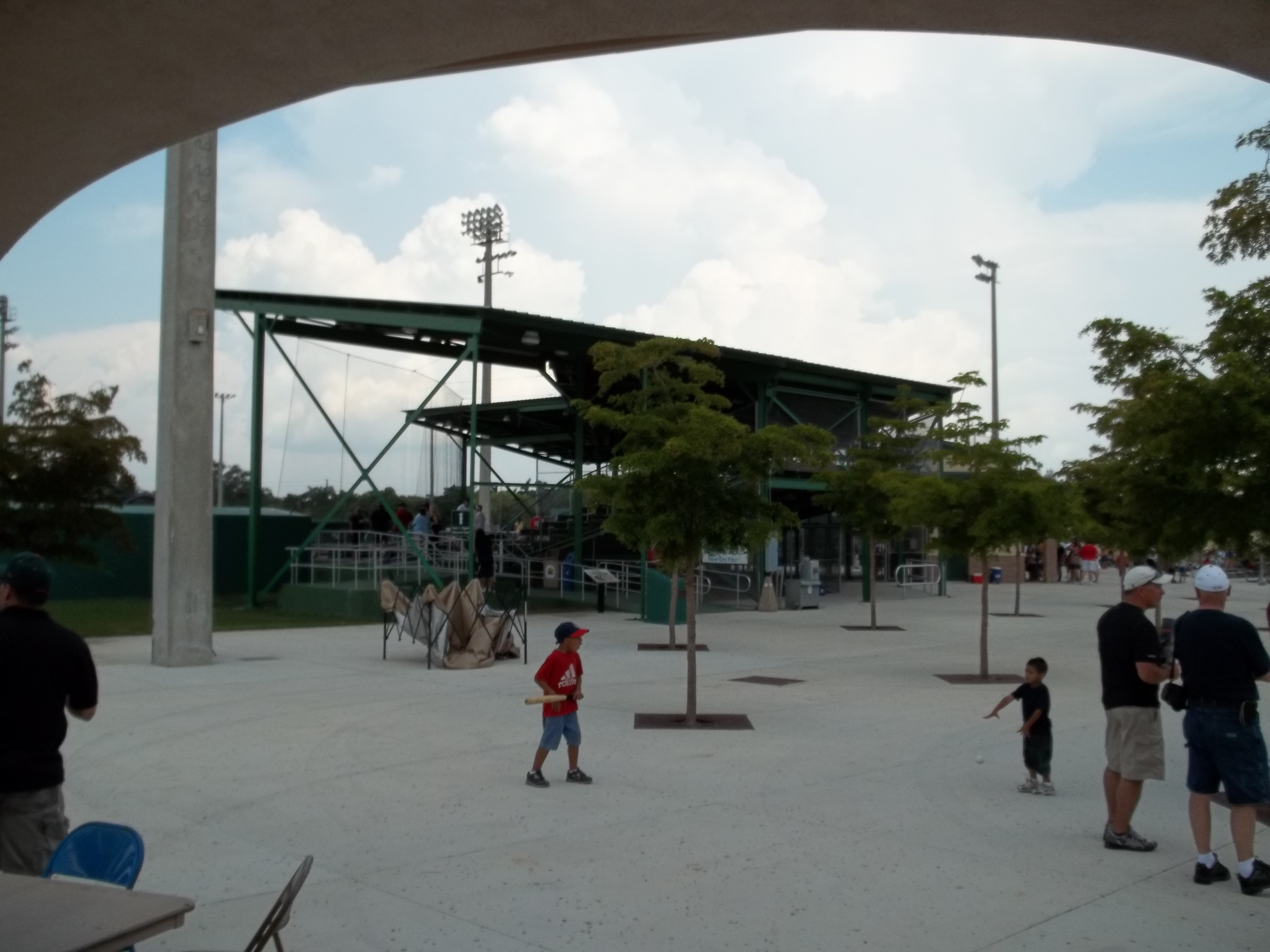
Terry Ballpark in June 2011

Today, over 160 college baseball teams from around the country use Terry Park in the month of March to begin their college season. The park is currently part of a multi-diamond facility serving various amateur levels of baseball. The facility sees year-round amateur baseball use. This property is part of the Lee County Multiple Property Submission, a Multiple Property Submission to the National Register. Terry Park is used year-round for baseball leagues, tournaments, and special events. The facility has four lighted fields with spectator seating including a covered grandstand on the main field. The park is also equipped with batting cages near each field. Terry Park is currently being remodeled with new restrooms, concession area, press box and seating areas. The work will be done in phases to allow the park to operate as close to normal as possible.

In 2020, the Kia Tigers of the Korean Baseball Organisation in South Korea, managed by former Major Leaguer Matt Williams, held spring training at Terry Park, and the team stayed in Fort Myers extended by pandemic restrictions.
