= Baseball City Royals =

- 1988–1992; Davenport, Florida

Minor league affiliations
- Previous classes: Class A (Advanced)
- League: Florida State League

Major league affiliations
- Previous teams: Kansas City Royals

Team data
- Previous names: Royals
- Previous parks: Baseball City Stadium

The Baseball City Royals were a farm team for the Kansas City Royals from 1988 to 1992, after moving from Fort Myers, Florida, where they were known as the Fort Myers Royals.

The Baseball City Royals (based in Davenport, FL) were members of the Florida State League in 1988. Managed by Luis Silverio, they had the FSL's second-best record that year at 79-60 but lost the first-half central division to the Osceola Astros by two games and the second-half race to the Lakeland Tigers by half a game. They were sixth in the 14-team league in attendance (63,746). Outscoring opponents just 557-545, the team had two All-Stars - catcher Carlos Escalera (.253/~.293/.345) and pitcher Aguedo Vasquez (3-2, 33 Sv, 1.67, 54 H in 80 2/3 IP). Vasquez led the FSL in saves and games pitched (62) and won the league's MVP award. Going on to fairly long and productive big league careers would be a sizeable contingent of Kevin Appier (10-9, 2.75), 1B-DH Jeff Conine (.272/~.345/.443), 3B Sean Berry (.234/~.309/.319, 24 SB) and 2B Brian McRae (.308/~.378/.355).

In 1989, the Royals had a worse overall record by one game (78-61) but won the first half in the central division (42-27). In the playoffs, they fell 2 games to 0 to the St. Petersburg Cardinals. The attendance plummeted to 39,220 (12th). Silverio's club led the FSL in offense (698 runs) while they allowed 615. They had no All-Stars that season. OF Pete Alborano (.337/~.385/.411) and C Jorge Pedre (.327/~.367/.500) provided excellent contact, while Escalera improved to .294/~.344/.417. Also returning were Berry (.266/~.339/.378, 37 SB) and Conine (.273/~.335/.433, 32 SB, a team-high 14 HR and 91 K). Dazzling on the hill were Carlos Maldonado (11-3, 9 Sv, 1.17, 47 H in 77 IP) and Dennis Moeller (9-0, 1.77).

Brian Poldberg became manager in 1990 and the team fell to 60-78 while they drew a league-low 18,884. Outscored 675-542, the club had few bright spots. A few bright spots were Mark Parnell (2-2, 17 Sv, 1.86, 24 H, 40 K in 39 IP) and Greg Harvey (5-1, 2.04, 27 H in 40 IP) on the mound. OF Jacob Brumfield overcame a release in spring training and won the batting title at .366/.429/.417. He also paced the FSL in OBP and stole 47 bases in 57 attempts. He made the league's All-Star team.

The 1991 Baseball City team had a 446-461 run margin and the Carlos Tosca-managed nine went 62-69. At 35-30 in the second half, they were one game behind Lakeland in the Central. Doug Harris (10-6, 2.47) finished ninth in ERA for the All-Star-less team. OF Kerwin Moore (.210/~.319/.322) led the FSL in steals (61) and strikeouts (141) while the top offensive threat was 3B Phil Hiatt (.298/~.344/.451, 28 SB). Brian Ahern (7-2, 2.00) was effective in 13 starts, while the bullpen boasted fine production from Matt Karchner (6-3, 5 Sv, 1.97, 49 H in 73 IP), Tony Long (7-3, 10 Sv, 1.96) and Skip Wiley (4-2, 17 Sv, 1.68). They drew 21,174 fans, next-to-last in the FSL.

In 1992, the Royals were 71-60 and finished sixth under the guidance of Ron Johnson. Their attendance of 17,406 was second-lowest, but almost 40,000 less than the next team. Making the playoffs as a wild card, they stunned the favorite Sarasota White Sox 2 games to 0 then beat the Osceola Astros 2 games to 1, before falling to Lakeland 2 games to 0 in the finals. They had a 532-464 edge in runs. FSL managers selected C Lance Jennings (.259/~.317/.420) as the 8th-best prospect in the loop and he was their only All-Star, sharing FSL All-Star honors with Dunedin's Carlos Delgado. 1B Joe Vitiello (.283/~.357/.388) made the league's top 10 in average, while 3B Joe Randa hit .275/~.318/.328 in 51 contests. Long (3-3, Sv, 1.83) again pitched well, as did Kevin Kobetitsch (3-0, 4 Sv, 1.26, .78 WHIP). Jon Lieber (3-3, 4.65) made seven appearances en route to a fine MLB career.

In 1993, Kansas City moved their high class-A affiliate to the Wilmington Blue Rocks. The Baseball City FSL franchise was then shifted to Daytona Beach, where it became the Daytona Cubs.

== Year-by-year record ==
Year	Record	Finish	Manager	Playoffs
1988	79-60	2nd	Luis Silverio	
1989	78-61	4th	Luis Silverio	Lost in 1st round
1990	60-78	11th	Brian Poldberg	
1991	62-69	9th	Carlos Tosca	
1992	71-60	6th	Ron Johnson	Lost League Finals

== See also ==
- Baseball City Royals players
