= Fort Myers Palms =

- 1926; Fort Myers, Florida
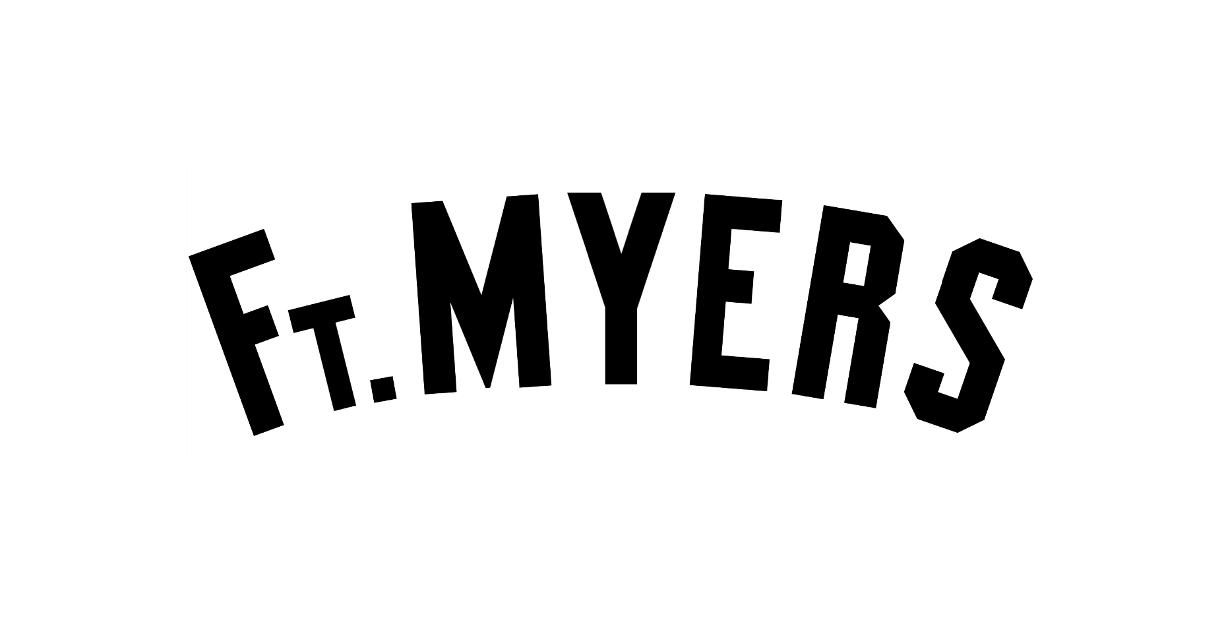

Minor league affiliations
- Previous classes: Class D (1926)
- Previous leagues: Florida State League (1926)

Team data
- Name: Fort Myers Palms (1926)
- Ballpark: Terry Park Ballfield (1926)
- President: John Wall Hendry
- Manager: Buck Conroy; Joe Johnston; Pete Doyle; Pat Doran

The Fort Myers Palms were a Minor League Baseball team in the Florida State League in 1926. The team was founded by John Wall Hendry; it played home games at Terry Park Ballfield in Fort Myers, Florida.

The Palms finished the first half of the 1926 season in third place with a record of 34 wins and 25 losses; it then finished the second half of the season in fifth place with a record of 33 wins and 27 losses.

Due to lack of attendance and financial difficulties, the team played only one season. In January 1927, the Fort Myers franchise was officially forfeited.

== History ==
=== 1925: Acquisition attempts ===
On July 10, 1925, Hendry announced that he had purchased the Sanford Celeryfeds, a professional minor league baseball franchise, for the city of Fort Myers. The next day, however, Charley Britt, owner of the Sanford club, reneged on his verbal agreement to sell the team after new backers had agreed to put up the $5,000 needed to keep the Celeryfeds in Sanford.

A week later, Hendry offered to purchase the Lakeland Highlanders for $7,000 but ended discussions when Clare Henley, president of the Lakeland franchise, made a countering proposal.

=== 1926: Founding, first and only season, fundraising ===
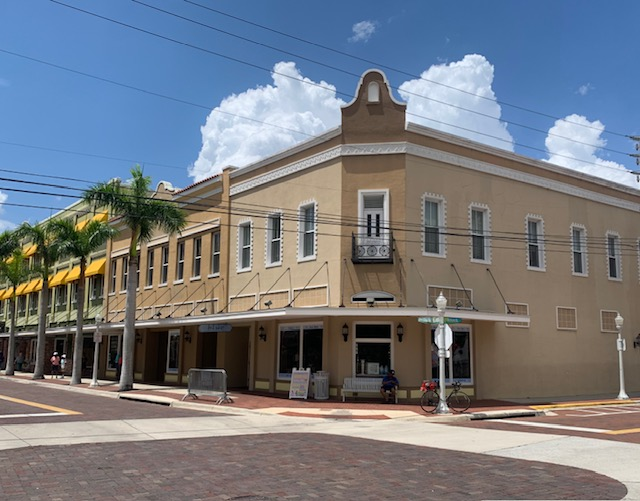
In 1926, Hendry Brothers Realty Co. occupied the first floor of the Heitman Building at First and Jackson Streets in Fort Myers, Florida. This location also served as the business office for the Fort Myers Baseball Club.

The next year, in 1926, Hendry was successful in his application for a new Florida State League franchise for Fort Myers. Hendry selected Palms as the team nickname because it was "short and sweet and means something" (Fort Myers has been known as the "City of Palms").

On April 22, 1926, in front of 1,500 fans at Terry Park, the Palms won the first game in the franchise's history, defeating the St. Petersburg Saints 3–0. In the third inning, Palms shortstop Mike Bouza tripled and then stole home. Palms pitcher Joe Hernandez gave up 9 hits and hit two batters (including beaning Saints shortstop Dick Luckey in the sixth) but pitched a complete game shutout for the Palms.

By the end of April, the Palms had a 7 and 1 record, putting them in first place in the Florida State League standings. Although there was plenty of interest in the Palms throughout Fort Myers, attendance at home games was light, and financial support for the team was lacking. On June 23, 1926, Hendry announced that he was unable to keep personally financing the team, meaning that the Fort Myers franchise would be surrendered at the end of the first half of the Florida State League season.

Two days later, Hendry hosted a meeting with representatives of the Lions Club and a committees of the Chamber of Commerce at his Hendry Brothers Realty Company office. There, it was agreed-upon that the Lions and Chamber committee members would go door-to-door to solicit donations from businesses and citizens to raise the $3,000 needed for the Palms to complete the season in Fort Myers.

Over the next three days, the names of 137 citizens (and businesses) with the amounts of their donations were itemized in the Fort Myers Tropical News; Fort Myers Chief of Police Larkin Moses Stroup had made the first donation with $25. By the end of June, the Lions had raised $1,740.50. Encouraged by the financial support, Hendry agreed to finish out the first season.

The Palms finished the first half of the Florida State League season in third place with a record of 34 wins and 25 losses. At the end of July, the Palms were in first place with a second half record of 14 wins and 9 losses. By the end of August, the Palms had slipped to third place, just one game behind the league leading Orlando Colts. On September 7, the Palms were in first place with a 32 wins and 22 losses. The Palms then went on to lose five of their last six games, after which they finished the second half of the Florida State League season in fifth place with a record of 33 wins and 27 losses.

Ultimately, in 1926, the Fort Myers Palms won more games (67) than any other team in the Florida State League, but the Sanford Celeryfeds won the first and second half pennants by percentage points and were the league champions.

=== 1927: Franchise forfeit ===
On January 18, 1927, the mid-winter meeting of the directors of the Florida State League was held in Sanford, Florida. Fort Myers was not represented at the meeting. During the meeting, the Fort Myers Palms franchise was voted forfeited for failing to meet league assessments and failing to pay players during the latter part of the 1926 season.

== Major Leaguers ==
Two members of the 1926 Fort Myers Palms played major league baseball:

- Joe (Cheo) Hernandez: Cuban Stars (West) (1920)
- Jim Moore: Cleveland Indians (1928–29) and Chicago White Sox (1930)

== Other Minor League Baseball teams in Fort Myers ==
In addition to the Fort Myers Palms in 1926, Fort Myers has been home to two additional minor league franchises:

- Fort Myers Royals, affiliate of the Kansas City Royals (1978–1987)
- Fort Myers Mighty Mussels (formerly the Fort Myers Miracle), affiliate of the Minnesota Twins (1992–present)
