= Arkansas Twister =

Retired wooden roller coaster

- Previously known as Florida Hurricane (1987-1990); Michael Jackson's Thrill Coaster (1980-1987); The Roaring Tiger (1978-1980)
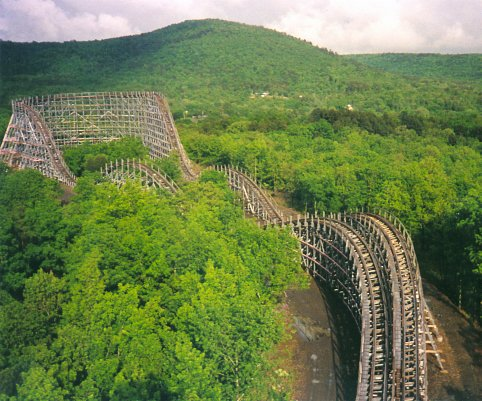

Magic Springs and Crystal Falls
- Coordinates: 34°31′17″N 93°00′52″W
- Status: Closed
- Opening date: May 30, 1992
- Closing date: 2024
- Cost: $900,000
- Arkansas Twister at Magic Springs and Crystal Falls at RCDB

Boardwalk and Baseball
- Name: Florida Hurricane
- Coordinates: 28°13′42.5″N 81°38′31″W
- Status: Removed
- Opening date: 1978
- Closing date: January 17, 1990
- Cost: $2.3 million
- Florida Hurricane at Boardwalk and Baseball at RCDB

General statistics
- Type: Wood – Out and back
- Manufacturer: Michael Black and Associates
- Designer: Don Rosser / Bill Cobb
- Track layout: Out and back
- Lift/launch system: Chain lift hill
- Height: 95 ft (29 m)
- Drop: 92 ft (28 m)
- Length: 3,340 ft (1,020 m)
- Speed: 50 mph (80 km/h)
- Duration: 2:00
- Max vertical angle: 45°
- Height restriction: 48 in (122 cm)

Arkansas Twister is a retired wooden roller coaster at Magic Springs and Crystal Falls amusement park in Hot Springs, Arkansas. Originally opening in 1978 as The Roaring Tiger at Circus World theme park, the roller coaster was purchased in 1991 by Magic Springs, where it reopened as Arkansas Twister on May 30, 1992. It features a 92-foot drop (28 m) and reaches speeds of up to 50 miles per hour (80 km/h) as it travels through the foothills of the Ouachita Mountains. The ride was also known as "Florida Hurricane" and "Michael Jackson's Thrill Coaster" over the years. Magic Springs purchased the ride from Boardwalk and Baseball for $10,000, and relocation costs brought the total investment to roughly $900,000. Prior to the 2025 season, Magic Springs listed Arkansas Twister as "retired" on their website, noting "the 2025 season marks official retirement for the beloved wooden coaster and she will remain permanently closed". The park states the ride will not be removed for the foreseeable future, and will remain standing but not operating.

== History ==
The roller coaster made its debut in 1978 as The Roaring Tiger at Circus World in Haines City, Florida. Designed by Don Rosser & Associates and renowned coaster engineer Bill Cobb, the ride cost $2.3 million to construct using over a half-million feet of Douglas fir lumber. With 3,340 feet (1,020 m) of track and speeds originally up to 60 miles per hour (97 km/h), it was billed as "the South's longest and fastest roller coaster" by the park. It was famously known as a personal favorite of celebrity Michael Jackson, who visited the park frequently in the 1980s to ride.

As Circus World changed ownership several times over the years, the roller coaster was renamed briefly to "Michael Jackson's Thrill Coaster" and eventually to "Florida Hurricane" when the park reopened as Boardwalk and Baseball in 1987. Boardwalk and Baseball closed shortly thereafter in 1990, and its rides were either demolished or sold to the highest bidder. Magic Springs and Crystal Falls purchased the Florida Hurricane for $10,000 in 1991, and spent close to $900,000 relocating the ride.

On May 30, 1992, the roller coaster opened to the public as "Arkansas Twister" at Magic Springs amusement park in Hot Springs, Arkansas. For the 2002 season, the park invested $2 million restoring the roller coaster to its original condition when it was located in Florida, modifying the "dips" to Cobb's original specifications.

In early 2025, Magic Springs listed Arkansas Twister as "retired" on their website. The ride will remain standing but not operating, with no current plans to remove it.

== Ride experience ==
The ride begins as the train exits the station and immediately enters the 95-foot (29 m) lift hill. After reaching its peak, the train drops 92 feet (28 m) at a 45-degree angle and banks slightly left as it elevates into a short hill, providing riders significant lateral g-force. The track straightens as the train makes a second descent into another short hill which produces an "air-time" experience. The third hill is followed by a steep climb into the ride's 180-degree turnaround that features brakes to slow the train. On its way back, the train descends from the turnaround into a series of two shorter hills, the second of which banks to the right at its crest. The following hill is larger and sits directly beside the roller coaster's lift hill, with wooden supports surrounding riders as they pass through. The ride's finale features two very short hills and another 180-degree turnaround before the coaster meets the final brake run and returns to the station.
