= Wrigley Field (Avalon) =

Stadium in Avalon, California

Wrigley Field, Avalon
- Interactive map of Wrigley Field, Avalon
- Location: 420 Avalon Canyon Road, Avalon CA 90704
- Coordinates: 33°20′N 118°19′W
- Owner: Chicago Cubs
- Operator: Chicago Cubs
- Surface: Grass
- Field size: Left - 327 ft. Center - 425 ft. Right - 298 ft.

Construction
- Opened: 1921

Tenant
- Chicago Cubs (NL) (1921–1941; 1946–1951) (spring training)

Wrigley Field (Avalon) was a stadium in Avalon, California. It originally opened in 1921 and was used as a spring training venue by the Chicago Cubs Major League Baseball team. It was named for William Wrigley Jr., the owner of the Cubs.

Located on Santa Catalina Island, it was constructed in 1921 and hosted the Cubs for spring training from 1921 through 1951 except for the World War II years from 1942 through 1945. The stadium was demolished in 1966.

== See also ==
- List of Major League Baseball spring training ballparks
