= Justin Adam =

Canadian baseball player, photographer and musician

- Born: Justin James Adam; August 22, 1974 (age 51); Windsor, Ontario
- Education: University of Windsor (BA); Vancouver Film School
- Spouses: Paula Rivera (m. 2003; div. 2004) Ani Castillo (m. 2012; div. 2021)
- Children: 2

Justin James Adam (born August 22, 1974) is a Canadian photographer, musician and former professional baseball player in the Kansas City Royals organization.

== Career ==
=== Baseball ===
Adam was drafted in the 7th round of the 1992 Major League Baseball draft by the Kansas City Royals. From 1992 to 1994, he played for the Gulf Coast League Royals. In 1995, he played for the Spokane Indians. In 1996, Adam played his final year of professional baseball with the Lansing Lugnuts.

=== The arts ===
Adam shifted careers to the arts. In the mid-2000s, he began performing as the noise solo act Birdband. He later adopted the moniker Moon McMullen for his recording work. In the 1990s he studied film at University of Windsor and the Vancouver Film School.

In 2001, Adam began work on his first film The Man with a DV Cam along with Mike Hawley. The film was entered into the 2002 Slamdance Film Festival. Adam and Hawley were the only Canadians in the short-film competition as well as one of two Canadian films at the festival, the other being Lee Demarbre's Jesus Christ Vampire Hunter. The film won the Best Poster award at the festival, tied with Lefty-Righty. In the late 2000s, Adam began taking photographs for magazines, journals and models including Kate Bock. In 2014 Adam founded Miniature Massive with the aim to "create solutions and designs to make a more positive impact".

== Awards ==
Adam has received multiple awards from Applied Arts Magazine:

- 2013: Winner, Community Agency Website (Design Category)
- 2013: Winner, Fancy Franks Website (Design Category)
- 2013: Winner, Lighthaus Brochure (Design Category)
- 2013: Winner, Community Agency Craft Illustrations
- 2013: Winner, Community Agency, Magazine Ad (Advertising Illustration)
- 2014: Winner, Caesarstone Reveal (Design Category)

== Geary Lane ==
Adam, along with his partner Jason Pollard under their experimental production collective Man Finds Fire, spearheaded the branding, creative direction, curation of content, and programming during Geary Lane music venue's inaugural year. The venue garnered significant press attention for its efforts.

== Toquefest Film and Music Festival ==
Toquefest Film and Music Festival was an outdoor event originally created as an alternative to the Vancouver International Film Festival. Adam developed the festival from scratch, garnering attention from the media and securing a partnership and sponsorship from the National Film Board. The NFB provided exclusive content for the festival each year.

== Birdband ==
Birdband was a music side project undertaken by Adam in the noise and punk scene in Vancouver.
