= Dominican Summer League Royals =

- Founded in 1989; Boca Chica

Minor league affiliations
- Class: Rookie
- League: Dominican Summer League
- Division: Boca Chica Northwest

Major league affiliations
- Team: Kansas City Royals

Minor league titles
- League titles (1): 2019
- Division titles (1): 1

Team data
- Name: Royals
- Ballpark: Kansas City Royals Complex
- Owner/ Operator: Kansas City Royals
- Manager: Ramon Martínez

The Dominican Summer League Royals or DSL Royals are a minor league baseball team in the Dominican Summer League. The team plays in the Boca Chica Northwest division and is affiliated with the Kansas City Royals. The DSL Royals1 won the organization's first Dominican Summer league title in 2019. They did so by defeating the DSL D-Backs2 on September 6, 1-0. There's also a DSL Royals2 team, as these two squads join seven other minor league organizations as Kansas City Royals affiliates.

== History ==
The team first came into existence in 1989 as an independent Royals affiliate. The following year, they shared an affiliation with the New York Mets. In 1991, the team shared an affiliation with the Chicago Cubs, and an affiliation with the Colorado Rockies was added in 1992. While the Cubs were dropped in 1993, the team would continue its joint affiliation with the Rockies until 1996. In 1997, it once again became an independent affiliate of the Royals. In 2018, the Kansas City Royals were ranked the top educational program among all 30 MLB teams and their respective programs in the Dominican Republic, as voted by MLB.

== Roster ==
Dominican Summer League Royals Ventura roster
Players	Coaches/Other
Pitchers: 78 Alejandro Beltran; -- Diony Brujan; 6 Alving Campusano; 67 Juan Cordero; 58 Argenis Done; 79 Angel Garcia; 66 Jesus Garcia; 75 Carlos Gonzalez; 56 Janiel Hernandez; 49 Jerlin Madera; 26 Frankeurys Marte; 35 Ernesto Mejia; 53 Kenyer Penaloza; 77 Reynell Ramos; 51 Hancer Regalado; 46 Olyver Rosas; 77 Adrian Rumardo; -- Andy Sanchez; 43 Rafi Santo; 76 Junior Suarez; Catchers: 31 Alberto Aguilar; 32 Anthony Longo; 16 Adrián Lunar; 25 Emmanuel Martinez; 2 Reynaldo Sanchez; Infielders: 72 Alan Angulo; 36 Juan Batista; 0 Warren Calcaño; 62 Angelmis De La Cruz; 11 Luis Gutierrez; 12 Luis Steven King; 13 Daniel Liriano; 3 Omar Mejia; 3 Rafi Santo; 1 Marwin Rivero; Outfielders: 24 Max De La Cruz; 15 Angeibel Gómez; 22 Alejandro Guerrero; 27 Maicoll Rondon	Manager: -- Sergio De Luna; Coaches: -- Onil Joseph (first base); -- Fernando Martinez (hitting); -- Leonel Santiago (pitching); -- Quilvio Veras (bench); 7-day injured list; * On Kansas City Royals 40-man roster; ~ Development list; # Rehab assignment; ∞ Reserve list; ‡ Restricted list; § Suspended list; † Temporarily inactive list; Roster updated September 24, 2026; Transactions; → More rosters: MiLB • Dominican Summer League; → Kansas City Royals minor league players

Dominican Summer League Royals Fortuna roster
Players	Coaches/Other
Pitchers: 73 Carlos Beras; 37 Samuel Carmona; 33 Oliver Del Rosario; 55 Luis Garces; 45 Jordin Jhonni; 59 Luis Lora; 61 Carlos Luces; 38 Delvin Medina; 52 Yolber Mendez; 57 Ricardo Montilla; 65 Cesar Mora; 47 Garvell Pinales; 48 Juan Rivera; 44 Melvin Robles; 50 Javier Rojas; 54 Danny Sanchez; 68 Andruw Solarte; 18 Neftali Taveras; Catchers: 82 Marcos Hernandez; 39 Richer Mata; 19 Jose Montilla; Infielders: 8 Leandro Briceno; 62 Angelmis De La Cruz; 63 Franniel De Los Santos; 74 Anderson Garcia; 23 Jesus Ortega; 7 Roy Rivero; 9 Jaider Suarez; 41 Renso Tenas; Outfielders: 28 Robinson Chacon; 4 Joshua Fermin; 29 Luis Ramon King; 37 Daury Martinez; -- Enmanuel Santos ‡	Manager: -- Ramon Martinez; Coaches: -- Irving Falu (bench); -- Jordan Norberto (pitching); -- Ariel Venegas (first base); -- Jose Veras (pitching); 7-day injured list; * On Kansas City Royals 40-man roster; ~ Development list; # Rehab assignment; ∞ Reserve list; ‡ Restricted list; § Suspended list; † Temporarily inactive list; Roster updated September 24, 2026; Transactions; → More rosters: MiLB • Dominican Summer League; → Kansas City Royals minor league players
