= Jaycee Park (Fort Pierce, Florida) =

Former home of Pittsburgh Pirates spring training in Fort Pierce, Florida, US

- Interactive map of Jaycee Park
- Former names: Jaycee Field
- Location: US Highway 1 Fort Pierce, Florida, United States
- Coordinates: 27.468631°N 80.333651°W
- Owner: City of Fort Pierce
- Capacity: 5,000
- Surface: Grass
- Field size: Left Field - 333 ft. Center Field - 400 ft. Right Field -335 ft.

Construction
- Demolished: 1954

Tenants
- MLB Spring Training: Pittsburgh Pirates (NL) (1954)

Jaycee Park, located in Fort Pierce, Florida, was the spring training home of the Pittsburgh Pirates in 1954. The Pirates had an enjoyable stay in Fort Pierce but left after one year when Fort Myers, Florida offered the team a renovated facility and a guarantee on ticket revenue.

== Pittsburgh Pirates ==
Up until 1952 the Pirates had an on again, off again relationship with San Bernardino, California as the site of their spring training. In 1953, the team had a dismal camp in Havana, Cuba. The Pirates were looking for a long term location for their spring home. Branch Rickey, the Pirates General Manager, visited several prospective spring training locations for 1954. The finalists were Ocala, Fort Myers and Fort Pierce.

Once the Pirates settled on Fort Pierce for their 1954 Spring Training location, Jaycee Field was configured with big-league dimensions: 333 feet from home plate to left field, 400 feet to center and 330 feet to right field. After installing bleachers from an adjacent football field, seating capacity was increased to 5,000. The city also agreed to install a practice infield and to expand the clubhouses.

The Pirates were a special business rate to stay at the Shamrock Village, a former Navy training base that had been converted at a cost of $1.5 million into 150 efficiency apartments and 44 motel rooms. The Pirates were charged $10 per man per day: $3.75 per man per room and $6.25 per man for meals at the nearby Flamingo Restaurant.

The Pirates’ first exhibition game in Fort Pierce was played on a Sunday, March 7, against the Detroit Tigers. Pittsburgh won 7–3. At the end of Spring Training 1954, the Pirates left for Pittsburgh to begin the regular season. Three months later, the Pirates signed an agreement to train in Fort Myers, primarily because that city guaranteed $30,000 in admissions to 10 exhibition games.

Jaycee Park was later demolished. The field was located near U.S. Route 1 on the site occupied now by the city's police headquarters.
