= Riverside Park, Dawson Springs =

Ballpark in Dawson Springs, Kentucky

Riverside Park
- The Great Wooden Ballpark
- Interactive map of Riverside Park
- Former names: Tradewater Park
- Location: 901 W. Arcadia Ave; Dawson Springs, KY 42408; United States
- Coordinates: 37°09′39″N 87°41′53″W
- Owner: City of Dawson Springs
- Operator: City of Dawson Springs
- Surface: Grass
- Field size: Left Field – 335 ft. Center Left- 365ft. Center Field – 405 ft. Center Right – 365 ft. Right Field – 335ft.

Construction
- Groundbreaking: 1904
- Opened: 1914
- Renovated: 1999 Rebuilt
- Closed: Circa 1935–1999
- Demolished: Circa 1935 flood
- Main contractor: Dawson Springs Community

Tenants
- Pittsburgh Pirates (NL) (1914–1916); Dawson Springs Resorters (1916); Tradewater Pirates (KIT) (1999–2011)

Riverside Park, located in Dawson Springs, Kentucky, was originally built in 1914 to serve as a spring training park for the Pittsburgh Pirates from 1914 to 1917. Sometimes referred to as Tradewater Park, it is the only known baseball park in Kentucky to have hosted a major league team since the Louisville Colonels folded in 1899. While the original stadium was destroyed in a flood in the 1930s, it was later rebuilt in 1999. Like the original stadium, the rebuilt park is reconstructed out of wood. It is the only ballpark of its kind in Western Kentucky.

== History ==
=== Initial park ===
Dawson Springs is home to a mineral spring that was believed by many to have medical healing qualities. This led to it becoming a huge resort town. Thousands of people came to drink and bathe in the spring. Forty hotels sprung up to accommodate the tourists. The Pittsburgh Pirates seeing these large crowds decided to make Dawson Springs their spring training home.

In 1914 Riverside Park was built to serve as the spring training venue for the Pirates. The entire ballpark was made entirely from wood, from the grandstand to the dugout. Local citizens then constructed a large indoor pavilion for spring training and exhibition games and an additional wing was built onto the New Century Hotel to accommodate the players. Teams soon came from St. Louis, Chicago, Kansas City, Louisville, Indianapolis, Cincinnati and Philadelphia, as well as minor league squads from Columbus, Ohio and Toledo, Ohio to play the Pirates at Riverside Park. These teams consisted of other major league squads, American Association teams, colleges, semi-professional teams, and even teams formed by local mining companies and businesses. Hall of Famer Honus Wagner and his friends often went fishing at the Old Mill Dam, located right beside Riverside Park and a short walking distance from the New Century Hotel. Wagner, who trained on this field for 3 years, organized a team of local young boys known as "Honus Wagners' Young Recruits." Several other future members of the Hall of Fame including; Babe Ruth, "Shoeless" Joe Jackson, Casey Stengel, and Ty Cobb also played baseball at Riverside Park.

The team remained there through spring training of the 1916 season. The following season, the Pirates trained at Barrs Field, located in Jacksonville, Florida. Records also show that some major league teams played expedition games at Riverside Park until the early 1920s; the Boston Red Sox and Cincinnati Reds. Riverside Park then hosted many local teams, among them the Dawson Springs Resorters of the Kentucky–Illinois–Tennessee League, continued to provide baseball for western Kentucky.

In the 1930s a devastating storm flooded a river that runs alongside the field's first base line. The flood washed away the entire stadium. In the decades following the flood, residents in Dawson Springs were only left with the memories of the ballpark, as there was effort to rebuild the park.

=== Rebuilt park ===
In 1999 Dawson Springs' Mayor Stacia Peyton funded a public project to rebuild the park, to help preserve the history of the city. While public opinion reflected the need for the city to fund other civic needs, instead of rebuilding an old ballpark, Peyton pressed ahead with the plan. The goal of the project was to make the stadium as authentic as possible to the original. Riverside Park was rebuilt using the exact blueprints from the original 1914 design. The largest stumbling block for the engineers reconstructing the park was building the field entirely of wood, just like it had been in 1914. The rebuilt stadium's seats, roof, and beams were all made from wood, to create a one-of-a kind ballpark. It is currently the only completely wooden ballpark in the region.

The stadium was used until 2012 by the Tradewater Pirates of the KIT League and then the Ohio Valley League. The team was founded in 1999 and joined the KIT League in 2007. The Pirates' first game at Riverside was held on July 4, 1999. In 2008, the team celebrated its 10th anniversary. The club folded in 2012.
