= Posner Park =

Mixed-use development in Florida

Coordinates: 28.228°N 81.645°W

Project
- Opening date: March, 2008
- Size: 500,000 Square Feet (152,400 Meters)
- Developer: Trammell Crow Company
- Owner: the Posner family

Location
- Interactive map of Posner Park
- Location: Davenport, FL

Posner Park is a $500 million mixed-use development in Polk County, Florida, at the junction of Interstate 4 and US 27 north of Haines City.

== History ==
The development was the brainchild of Victor Posner (1918–2002), for whom it is named. Posner Park was developed by Trammell Crow Company as part of a series of joint ventures with MetLife, and the original land owners, the Posner family. It stands on the site of the former Circus World and Boardwalk and Baseball theme parks as well as the former site of the Kansas City Royals’ spring training facility.

The first stores opened in March 2008 and included Target, J.C. Penney, Belk Department Store (since closed), Dick's Sporting Goods, Best Buy, Staples, Ross, Michaels, PetSmart and Books-A-Million as the 10 anchor tenants that occupy nearly 500,000 sf of retail space on 80 acres.

In January 2014 the undeveloped area of Posner Park was set to be auctioned off in August 2014 as the owners filed for bankruptcy.

In September 2019 additional retail outlets were opened at Posner Village, immediately south of the original development. The new stores include Burlington and Five Below.
