= Clyde Goodwin =

American baseball player (1886–1963)

- Pitcher
- Born: September 2, 1881; Parke County, Indiana, U.S.
- Died: May 7, 1964 (aged 82); Hammond, Indiana, U.S.
- Batted: Right Threw: Right

MLB debut
- September 18, 1906, for the Washington Senators

Last MLB appearance
- October 2, 1906, for the Washington Senators

MLB statistics
- Win–loss record: 0–2
- Earned run average: 4.43
- Strikeouts: 9
- Stats at Baseball Reference

Teams
- Washington Senators (1906)

Clyde Samuel Goodwin (September 2, 1881 – May 7, 1964) was an American professional baseball pitcher. He played in the minor leagues from 1903 to 1914 and appeared in Major League Baseball in 1906. Goodwin was 5 feet, 11 inches tall and weighed 145 pounds.

== Career ==
Goodwin was born in Parke County, Indiana, in 1881. He attended Purdue University, where he played college baseball for the Boilermakers from 1905–1906.

He started his professional baseball career in the Central League in 1903, when he was 22 years old. The following season, he pitched in the Southern Association and had a win–loss record of 17–6.

In 1905, Goodwin went to the American Association. He won 23 games in 1905 and 16 games in 1906 before being purchased by the American League's Washington Senators in August. Goodwin played four games for the major league club in September and October 1906, going 0–2 with a 4.43 earned run average. That was the only time he made it to the majors. In 1907, he returned to the AA's Milwaukee Brewers and went 21–23, leading the league in innings pitched (376) and losses.

Goodwin stayed in the American Association until 1909. He joined the Southern Association's Memphis Turtles in 1910, went 5–12 over two years, and then pitched for the Texas League's San Antonio Bronchos from 1911 to 1914. He won 22 games for the Bronchos in 1912, which was the third and last time that he won more than 20 games in a season.

Goodwin retired from professional baseball after 1914. Overall, he had a win–loss record of 168–140 in the minor leagues during his 12-year career. He died in Hammond, Indiana, in 1964 and was buried in Russellville Cemetery.
