= Circus World (theme park) =

Amusement park in Florida, United States

- Previously known as: Ringling Bros. and Barnum & Bailey Circus World; Circus World Showcase
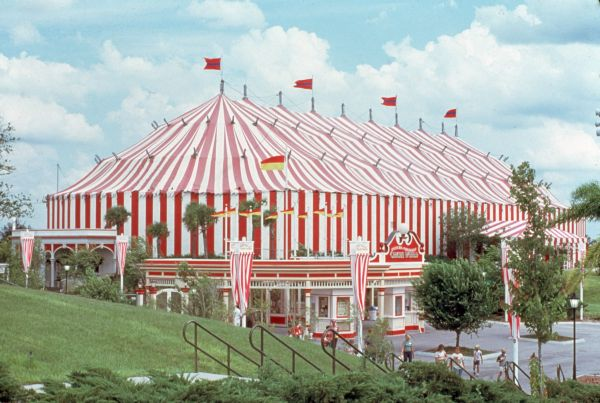
- View of the big tent at Circus World theme park
- Interactive map of Circus World
- Location: Davenport, Florida, U.S.
- Coordinates: 28.2314°N 81.6432°W
- Status: Defunct
- Opened: February 21, 1974
- Closed: May 12, 1986
- Owner: Ringling Bros. and Barnum & Bailey Circus Combined Shows Inc. (1974–1982); Mattel (1982–1983); Jim Monaghan (1983–1986); Harcourt Brace Jovanovich (1986)
- Theme: Circus
- Replaced by: Boardwalk and Baseball

Circus World was a theme park built in Davenport, Florida in Polk County, on the south-east corner of the Interstate 4-US 27 interchange. It was originally a property of the Ringling Bros. and Barnum & Bailey Circus Combined Shows Inc., and was intended additionally to be the circus's winter headquarters as well as to have the Ringling Bros. and Barnum & Bailey Clown College and its museum located there.

== History ==
Plans for Circus were announced by Irvin Feld as a project of Ringling Bros. and Barnum & Bailey Circus, in September 1972. They included a 19-story elephant-shaped hotel and Barnum City, a state-of-the-art residential community. These items and some of the other items were never built, but the plans did not change until after Mattel sold the park.

Circus World Showcase, its preview center, had its groundbreaking on April 26, 1973, with building contractor Mercury Construction Company of Haines City. The showcase was due to open in December 1973 when Mattel placed Ringling Bros. and Barnum & Bailey Circus Combined Shows Inc., including the park, up for sale. Venture Out in America, Inc., a Gulf Oil recreational subsidiary, agreed to buy the combined shows in January 1974, and the opening was further pushed back to 1975. While the Circus World Showcase opened on February 21, 1974, Venture Out placed the purchase deal back into negotiations, and the opening of the whole complex was moved to an early 1976. Early added rides included Zoomerang in 1977 and The Roaring Tiger in 1978. Attendance peaked in 1979 at 1.3 million. In 1980, the theme park made a profit.

Mattel sold the circus back to its previous owner, Irvin Feld and other parties in 1982, but kept the park, further expanding it with shows, rides, and a new roller coaster.

Attendance had declined for five straight years when Mattel agreed to sell the park to Jim Monaghan in 1983. The sale was finalized in 1984. Monaghan nicknamed the park Thrill City USA and made his objective to have the park be a world-class theme park. He added nine major European-built thrill rides and six youth rides.

According to Funways Holidays, Circus World developed a big problem with the opening of Walt Disney World's Epcot Center in late 1982. With most tourists taking a full four days visiting Central Florida, Disney World added Epcot to its passes, resulting in three days being filled, thus tourists usually only had one day to visit other venues and usually selected Sea World, Busch Gardens and/or Wet 'n Wild over Circus World.

In February 1985, Circus World started putting vintage objects and exhibits up for auction with Guernsey's auction house, including a 1921 original Marcus Illions Coney Island carousel and Gargantua II. These items did not add to the park's draw of attendees per Monaghan. The park made a profit in 1985.

Monaghan sold the park for stock to Harcourt Brace Jovanovich (now Harcourt, a division of Reed Elsevier) on May 10, 1986. Harcourt Brace Jovanovich, which had just bought several parks including the SeaWorld parks and Cypress Gardens, had a new idea for the area and closed the park at opening time that day to rebuild it into Boardwalk and Baseball. Circus World was never successful, as its standard carnival-type rides were no match for Disney's state-of-the-art attractions, and its location was out of the way relative to Disney World.

Under Mattel, then some under Monaghan, Funways Holidays also noted the park attendance was hurt by lagging in cleanliness, value and food. Also, constant staff turnover, ticket discounting, marketing errors and swift policy changes were issues.

== Attractions ==
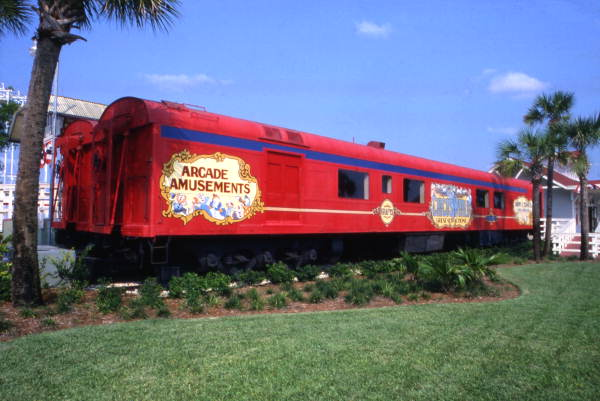
One of the antique Barnum and Bailey train cars that housed a display of circus memorabilia from Circus World.

- 1001 Nights - A swinging pendulum ride. The ride was moved to Geauga Lake in 1991, where it operated as El Dorado until the park's closure 2007, then relocated to Kings Dominion in 2009 before it was removed in 2011.
- Barnum City Train Station
- Be-a-Star Circus - a show with attendee participation as visitors can try the flying trapeze in a safety harness
- Big Top - A 27,000-square-foot (2,500 m2) building designed to look like a circus tent that featured restaurants, gift shops, an illusion show and an IMAX theater with a six-story screen.
- Bumper Cars
- Carousel
- Calypso
- The Center Ring
- Circus Pavilion
- Clown-A-Lot Children's Playground
- Dragon Coaster
- Elephant rides
- Great Western Stampede show
- The Hurricane - later known as The Roaring Tiger, this was a wooden coaster that served as the park's main attraction
- Jumbo, the Giant Wheel
- Para Tower - a three-person gondola drops along tower with a parachute and is for small children
- Petting Zoo
- Santa Maria
- Schlittenfahrt - A Matterhorn suspended trackless sleigh ride that travels over water speedily in an oval.
- The Ranger - a ship-like swing ride that rotates
- Tom Thumb Circus - an area featuring kiddie rides
- The Wave Swinger - Designed for kids, riders sit in wicker chairs suspended a hub and spin until forces pushes them outward.
- Wiener Looping - A launched shuttle coaster manufactured by Schwarzkopf that was relocated from a theme park in Austria and is currently operating at Selva Mágica in Mexico
- Wonderful World of Clowns
- Zoomerang - Later known as The Flying Daredevil, this was a looping steel shuttle coaster with a top speed of 45 miles per hour (72 km/h) The coaster was moved to Fun Spot Amusement Park & Zoo in Indiana where it operated as Afterburner until the park's closure in 2008. It remained SBNO until it was demolished in 2017.
