= Fort Myers Royals =

- 1978–1987; Fort Myers, Florida

Minor league affiliations
- Previous classes: Class A (1978–1987)
- League: Florida State League
- Division: South

Major league affiliations
- Previous teams: Kansas City Royals

Minor league titles
- League titles (1): 1985
- Division titles (2): 1984; 1985

Team data
- Previous parks: Terry Park

The Fort Myers Royals were a minor league affiliate of the Kansas City Royals from 1978 to 1987. In 1978 the Royals were brought to Fort Myers, Florida by the Kansas City franchise. This was because Fort Myers served as the spring training home of the Kansas City Royals. The Royals were a Single A Florida State League franchise. The team played at Terry Park Ballfield from 1978 until 1987. In 1985 the Royals won the Florida State League Championship. Kevin Seitzer was a member of that Fort Myers Royals team. The Minor League franchise left Fort Myers in 1988 when the Major League Baseball franchise moved Spring Training to Haines City, Florida and Baseball City Stadium.

== Season-by-season ==
League champions †	Finals appearance *	Division winner ^	Wild card berth ¤

Fort Myers Royals
Regular season
Year	League	Division	Place	Wins	Losses	WIN%	GB	Postseason
1978	FSL	South	3rd	71	66	.518	7.0	Lost semifinals (Miami Orioles) 1-0
1979	FSL	South	3rd	69	69	.500	20.5	
1980	FSL	South	3rd	66	70	.485	11.5	
1981	FSL	South	2nd	72	58	.554	7.0	Won semifinals (Fort Lauderdale Yankees) 1-0, Lost finals (Daytona Beach Astros)3-1
1982	FSL	South	3rd	69	68	.504	15.5	
1983	FSL	South	3rd	69	68	.504	15.5	
1984	FSL	South	1st ^	81	60	.574	—	Lost semifinals (Fort Lauderdale Yankees) 2-0
1985	FSL	West	1st ^	82	57	.590	—	Won semifinals (St. Petersburg Cardinals) 2-1, Won finals (Fort Lauderdale Yankees) 3-1
1986	FSL	South	4th	50	85	.370	37.5	
1987	FSL	South	6th	54	87	.383	30.5	

== Ballpark ==
The Fort Myers Royals played at Terry Park, located at 3410 Palm Beach Boulevard. Built in 1955, the historic ballpark was placed on the National Register of Historic Places in 1995. It sustained hurricane damage in 2004, that resulted in the grandstands being rebuilt. The ballpark still exists today as part of the Terry Park Sports Complex.

== Notable alumni ==
Numerous Fort Myers Royals alumni reached the major leagues; some of note include:

- Sean Berry (1987)
- Mike Butcher (1987)
- Tom Gordon (1987), MLB All-Star
- Greg Hibbard (1987)
- Ken Kravec (1987)
- Brian McRae (1987)
- Melido Perez (1987)
- Jerry Terrell (1987, MGR)
- Jacob Brumfield (1986)
- Luis de los Santos (1985)
- Kevin Seitzer (1985), 2 x MLB All-Star; 1987 AL hits leader
- Gary Thurman (1985)
- Bret Saberhagen (1983 3× MLB All-Star; 1985 World Series MVP; 1989 AL ERA leader; 2 × AL Cy Young Award (1985, 1989)
- David Cone (1982), 5 x MLB All-Star; Perfect Game 7/18/1999; 1994 AL Cy Young Award
- Mark Gubicza (1982), 2 x MLB All-Star
- Dennis Leonard (1982, 1985), 1977 AL wins leader
- Bill Pecota (1982–83)
- Butch Davis (1981)
- Tom Candiotti (1980)
- Don Slaught (1980)
- Atlee Hammaker (1979), MLB All-Star; 1983 NL ERA leader
- Pat Sheridan (1979–80)
- Gene Lamont (1978–80, MGR) 1993 AL Manager of the Year
- Renie Martin (1978)
- Darryl Motley (1978–80)
