= Luis Silverio =

Dominican baseball player and coach (born 1956)

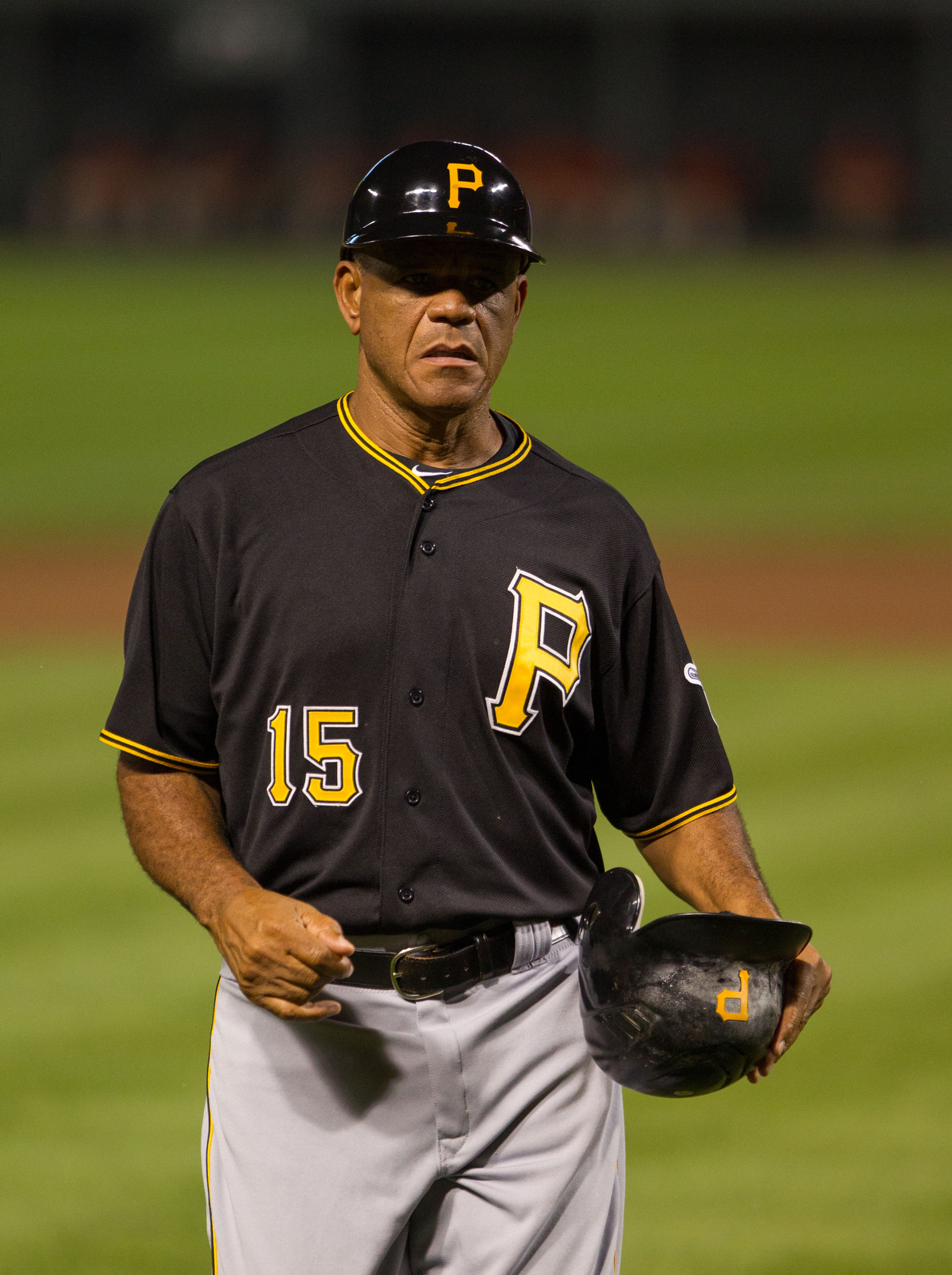
- Outfielder / Coach
- Born: October 23, 1956 (age 69); Villa González, Dominican Republic
- Batted: Right Threw: Right

MLB debut
- September 9, 1978, for the Kansas City Royals

Last MLB appearance
- September 30, 1978, for the Kansas City Royals

MLB statistics
- Batting average: .545
- Home runs: 0
- Runs batted in: 3
- Stats at Baseball Reference

Teams
- As player: Kansas City Royals (1978); As coach: Kansas City Royals (2003–2008); Pittsburgh Pirates (2011–2012)

Luis Pascual Silverio Delmonte (born October 23, 1956) is a Dominican former professional baseball player and coach, currently serving as the Senior Advisor to Latin American Operations for the Pittsburgh Pirates of Major League Baseball (MLB). In 2011 and 2012, he was the first-base, outfield and baserunning coach for the Pirates' major league team.

Prior to joining the Pittsburgh organization, Silverio spent thirty-five years in the Kansas City Royals' organization, and was a coach at the Major League level for the Royals from 2003–2008. Silverio has been associated with the Royals since he signed as a non-drafted free agent on November 12, 1973. Though he played in only eight games with the Royals in September 1978, he recorded six hits in his eleven career at bats. His .545 batting average is the highest in baseball history for any player who came to bat ten or more times in their career. Silverio coached in the Royals minor league system from 1983 to 1989. He was the general manager of the Royals' Dominican League entry from 1990 to 1992, the coordinator of Latin American operations from 1993 to 1999, the coordinator of Dominican operation from 2000 to 2002, and player development coordinator in 2009–2010. His daughter, Jennifer, is married to former Royals shortstop Ángel Berroa.

Silverio has two sons and two daughters and lives in Florida.
