= Baseball City Stadium =

Stadium in Davenport, Florida, U.S.

- Interactive map of Baseball City Stadium
- Location: 300 Ernie Caldwell Blvd; Davenport, Florida 33837
- Coordinates: 28.228256°N 81.641313°W
- Owner: Harcourt Brace Jovanovich Park Group (1988–1989); Busch Entertainment Corporation (1989–1990)
- Capacity: 8,000
- Surface: Grass
- Field size: Left - 330 ft. Center - 410 ft. Right - 330 ft.

Construction
- Built: 1987
- Opened: February 7, 1988
- Demolished: 2005
- Cost: $13,000,000

Tenants
- Kansas City Royals (MLB; spring training 1988—2002); Baseball City Royals (FSL; 1988-1992); Gulf Coast League Royals (GCL; 2001-2002)

Baseball City Stadium was a stadium located in Davenport, Florida (near Haines City) that was in use from 1988 to 2002. It was a portion of the Boardwalk and Baseball theme park. The two facilities adjoined at the interchange of Interstate 4 and Route 27, about 25 miles (40 km) southwest of Orlando. The facility had five practice fields in addition to the stadium. It was primarily used for baseball and was the spring training home of Kansas City Royals prior to the team moving to Surprise Stadium in 2003. The ballpark had a capacity of 8,000 people.

== History ==
The stadium was designed to be the cornerstone of the Boardwalk and Baseball theme park and opened on February 7, 1988. The Royals signed a 15-year contract, moved their spring training ballpark from Terry Park in Fort Myers, and relocated their Single A Florida State League affiliate, renamed The Baseball City Royals into the park for the 1988 season.

The stadium's first event was the 1988 Pizza Hut All-Star Softball game, played in front of 4,700 fans. The Royals played their first spring training game at the ballpark on March 4, 1988, in front of 3,281 who saw them lose 9–7 to the Houston Astros.

The Boardwalk and Baseball theme park rapidly proved itself a financial disaster. The owners and developers of the park, Harcourt Brace Jovanovich (now Harcourt, a division of Reed Elsevier), put little money into the park, and almost all money went into the baseball stadium. The property had originally been a failed amusement park called Circus World, and HBJ had simply renovated and re-opened the park, without adding new rides, hoping that the renaming along with the stadium would allow it to compete with nearby Walt Disney World. The park cut costs, including closing at dusk, and laying off several employees. In September 1989 HBJ sold the theme park and stadium to Anheuser-Busch, then operator of the Busch Gardens parks. In 1990 Anheuser-Busch closed the theme park, and by 1993 almost the entire amusement park had been torn down. Following the 1992 season, Kansas City moved their high class-A affiliate to the Wilmington Blue Rocks. The Baseball City FSL franchise was then shifted to Daytona Beach, where it became the Daytona Cubs.

Kansas City would continue to use the baseball stadium as it was a contemporary spring training facility and drew solid attendance numbers. Anheuser-Busch kept the stadium open rather than break the contract with the Royals. In 2001 the Royals moved their Rookie League team, the Gulf Coast League Royals into the stadium. When the contract expired at the end of the 2002 season, the Royals moved all of their spring training and rookie league operations to Surprise, Arizona, where a brand new $20 million park was being built and offered to any team willing to leave Florida. Soon after the Royals' departure, the stadium and the IMAX Theater, which were the only remaining parts of the original theme park, were demolished.

== Present day ==
After sitting idle for over a decade, the land was sold to developer Victor Posner in 2001. The ballpark was torn down in 2005 to make way for the new Posner Park; a retail complex with several big box stores opened on the site in 2008.
