= Davenport, Florida =

City in Florida, United States

- City
- City of Davenport
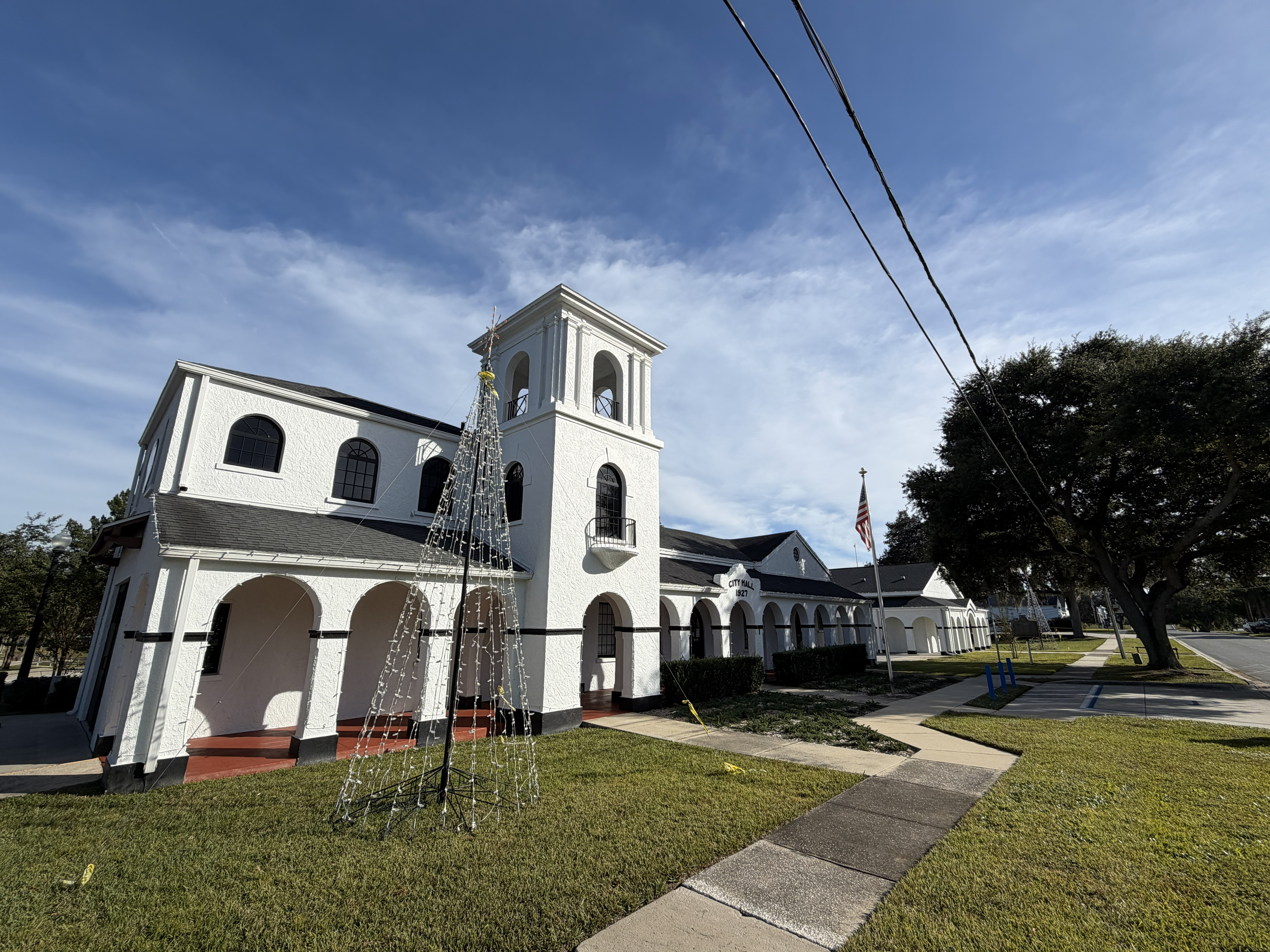
- Davenport City Hall

- Seal

- Location in Polk County and the state of Florida
- Coordinates: 28°09′30″N 81°37′16″W
- Country: United States
- State: Florida
- County: Polk
- Settled: 1838
- Incorporated: 1915

Government
  - Type: Commission-Manager

Area
  - Total: 4.20 sq mi (10.89 km^{2})
  - Land: 4.07 sq mi (10.53 km^{2})
  - Water: 0.14 sq mi (0.36 km^{2})
- Elevation: 135 ft (41 m)

Population (2020)
  - Total: 9,043
  - Estimate (2025): 18,110
  - Density: 2,224.3/sq mi (858.79/km^{2})
- Time zone: UTC-5 (Eastern (EST))
  - Summer (DST): UTC-4 (EDT)
- ZIP codes: 33837, 33897, 33896
- Area code: Area code 863
- FIPS code: 12-16450
- GNIS feature ID: 2404190
- Website: www.mydavenport.org

Davenport is a city in Polk County, Florida, United States. It is part of the Lakeland–Winter Haven Metropolitan Statistical Area. The population was 9,043 at the 2020 Census. The city's population has increased dramatically since the 2010 Census, when the population was 2,888.

== History ==
The settlement in the area now known as Davenport was established in 1838 when the US military set up Fort Davenport during the Second Seminole War, about 12 miles north of the present site of Davenport. The fort was one of a number built at 20 mile intervals along a trail from Fort Brooke to Fort Mellon. The fort only lasted a few years. The fort was named for Colonel William Davenport, who served as the local U.S. commander in the war. There is no known documentary evidence to support an alternative claim that the city was named for a railroad conductor.

The modern city of Davenport had its start in the 1880s when the South Florida Railroad was extended to that point. The settlement was first known as Horse Creek, for the creek first recorded on a US Army survey of 1849 which flows past the site to enter Snell Creek and eventually Lake Hatchineha in the Kissimmee River system. A post office was established at Horse Creek in 1884, and the name of the post office was changed to Davenport in 1886. Davenport was incorporated in 1915.

The South Florida Railroad opened a station half a mile north of the present site of the city. The railroad line was acquired by the Plant System in 1893, and the Atlantic Coast Line Railroad in 1902. In 1926, it was replaced by a new station in the downtown area. It was later closed in the 1970s. From 1958 to 1986 there was a second station, the Vertagreen Railroad Station, opened only for the transportation of fertilizer and not for public use.

== Geography and climate ==
Davenport is located within the Central Florida Highlands area of the Atlantic coastal plain with a terrain consisting of flatland interspersed with gently rolling hills.

According to the United States Census Bureau, the city has a total area of 1.6 square miles (4.1 km^{2}), of which 1.6 square miles (4.1 km^{2}) is land and 0.1 square miles (0.26 km^{2}) (3.68%) is water.

The exact coordinates for the city are located at 28°09′31″N 81°36′29″W.

Davenport is located in the humid subtropical zone, as designated by (Köppen climate classification: Cfa).

Climate data for Davenport, Florida
Month	Jan	Feb	Mar	Apr	May	Jun	Jul	Aug	Sep	Oct	Nov	Dec	Year
Record high °F (°C)	88 (31)	96 (36)	95 (35)	96 (36)	101 (38)	104 (40)	103 (39)	101 (38)	99 (37)	96 (36)	90 (32)	89 (32)	104 (40)
Mean daily maximum °F (°C)	72 (22)	74 (23)	79 (26)	84 (29)	89 (32)	92 (33)	93 (34)	93 (34)	91 (33)	86 (30)	80 (27)	74 (23)	84 (29)
Mean daily minimum °F (°C)	47 (8)	49 (9)	54 (12)	58 (14)	64 (18)	70 (21)	72 (22)	72 (22)	70 (21)	63 (17)	56 (13)	50 (10)	60 (16)
Record low °F (°C)	19 (−7)	21 (−6)	24 (−4)	31 (−1)	44 (7)	50 (10)	60 (16)	59 (15)	54 (12)	38 (3)	25 (−4)	16 (−9)	16 (−9)
Average precipitation inches (mm)	2.52 (64)	2.86 (73)	3.43 (87)	1.99 (51)	4.12 (105)	6.88 (175)	7.11 (181)	7.43 (189)	6.53 (166)	2.96 (75)	2.29 (58)	2.28 (58)	50.40 (1,280)

== Demographics ==
Historical population
Census	Pop.	Note	%±
1920	117		—
1930	650		455.6%
1940	640		−1.5%
1950	760		18.8%
1960	1,209		59.1%
1970	1,303		7.8%
1980	1,509		15.8%
1990	1,529		1.3%
2000	1,924		25.8%
2010	2,888		50.1%
2020	9,043		213.1%
2025 (est.)	18,110		100.3%
U.S. Decennial Census

=== Racial and ethnic composition ===
Davenport racial composition (Hispanics excluded from racial categories) (NH = Non-Hispanic)
Race	Pop 2010	Pop 2020	% 2010	% 2020
White (NH)	1,692	2,857	58.59%	31.59%
Black or African American (NH)	296	1,096	10.25%	12.12%
Native American or Alaska Native (NH)	7	28	0.24%	0.31%
Asian (NH)	28	173	0.97%	1.91%
Pacific Islander or Native Hawaiian (NH)	0	2	0.00%	0.02%
Some other race (NH)	5	80	0.17%	0.88%
Two or more races/Multiracial (NH)	29	309	1.00%	3.42%
Hispanic or Latino (any race)	831	4,498	28.77%	49.74%
Total	2,888	9,043		

=== 2020 census ===
As of the 2020 census, Davenport had a population of 9,043. The median age was 35.0 years. 25.4% of residents were under the age of 18 and 11.8% of residents were 65 years of age or older. For every 100 females there were 96.6 males, and for every 100 females age 18 and over there were 93.9 males age 18 and over.

99.6% of residents lived in urban areas, while 0.4% lived in rural areas.

There were 2,956 households in Davenport, of which 43.4% had children under the age of 18 living in them. Of all households, 59.0% were married-couple households, 13.8% were households with a male householder and no spouse or partner present, and 18.5% were households with a female householder and no spouse or partner present. About 14.2% of all households were made up of individuals and 4.9% had someone living alone who was 65 years of age or older.

There were 3,739 housing units, of which 20.9% were vacant. The homeowner vacancy rate was 9.2% and the rental vacancy rate was 27.7%.

=== Demographic estimates ===
According to the 2020 American Community Survey five-year estimates, there were 1,159 families residing in the city.

=== 2010 census ===
As of the 2010 United States census, there were 2,888 people, 953 households, and 687 families residing in the city.

=== 2000 census ===
As of the census of 2000, there were 1,924 people, 708 households, and 536 families residing in the city. The population density was 1,230.5 inhabitants per square mile (475.1/km^{2}). There were 913 housing units at an average density of 583.9 per square mile (225.4/km^{2}). The racial makeup of the city was 86.85% White, 6.91% African American, 0.57% Native American, 0.31% Asian, 4.52% from other races, and 0.83% from two or more races. Hispanic or Latino of any race were 11.12% of the population.

In 2000, there were 708 households, out of which 23.3% had children under the age of 18 living with them, 62.7% were married couples living together, 8.9% had a female householder with no husband present, and 24.2% were non-families. 20.8% of all households were made up of individuals, and 12.1% had someone living alone who was 65 years of age or older. The average household size was 2.55 and the average family size was 2.90.

In 2000, in the city, the population was spread out, with 20.7% under the age of 18, 7.4% from 18 to 24, 21.3% from 25 to 44, 22.0% from 45 to 64, and 28.6% who were 65 years of age or older. The median age was 46 years. For every 100 females, there were 89.4 males. For every 100 females age 18 and over, there were 86.4 males.

In 2000, the median income for a household in the city was $29,408, and the median income for a family was $41,000. Males had a median income of $31,341 versus $25,492 for females. The per capita income for the city was $15,544. About 7.2% of families and 10.8% of the population were below the poverty line, including 10.6% of those under age 18 and 10.8% of those age 65 or over.

== Economy ==
The area around Davenport in northeast Polk County used to be centered on the remote Circus World amusement park. It was redeveloped in 1987 into Boardwalk and Baseball and included a minor league baseball park that would attract spring training and minor league baseball teams for the Kansas City Royals, earning the area the moniker "Baseball City". The amusement park failed in 1990, and the Royals left for Arizona and the Cactus League in 2003. The Baseball City name is now extinct, and the area around the stadium (which was demolished in 2005) has been redeveloped into Posner Park, a large outdoor shopping mall.

== Transportation ==
- I-4 – Located 8 miles north of town, this freeway provides access westward to Lakeland and Tampa, and eastward to the Walt Disney World Resort and Orlando.
- US 17 / US 92 – This main north–south route cuts through the center of town, leading northward to Kissimmee and southward to Haines City.
- US 27 – Located a few miles west of town, US 27 provides access to I-4 going northward, and leads southward to Haines City and Lake Wales, Florida.

Railroads have always been a part of Davenport's history, and freight and passenger trains still run through the city, although the railroad stations have been closed for many years. The former ACL main line which ran through the city is now part of the CSX Carters Subdivision.

== Healthcare ==
The only hospital in Davenport is AdventHealth Heart of Florida.
