= Hammond Stadium =

Baseball field

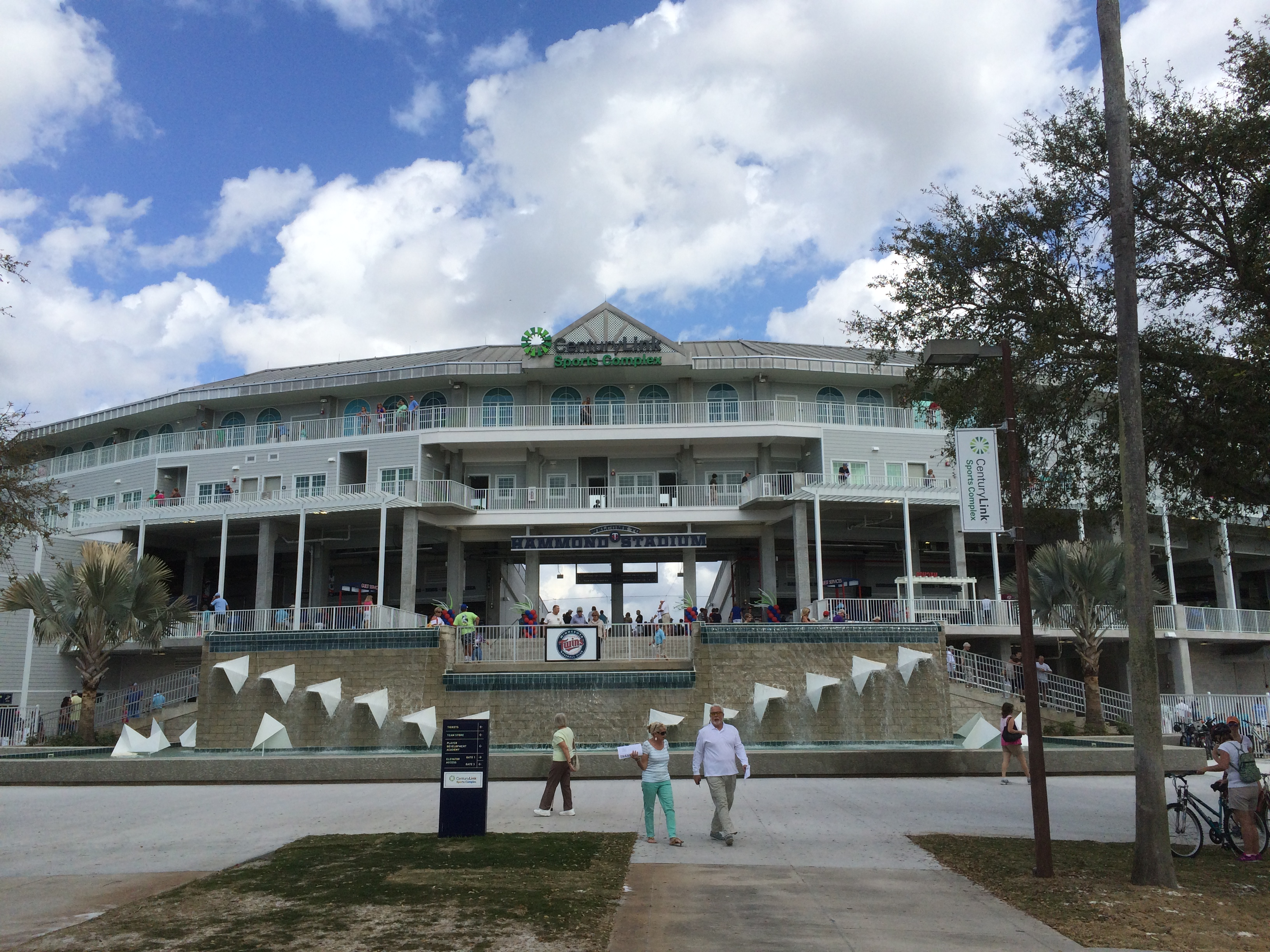
- Home of the Mighty Mussels
- Interactive map of Hammond Stadium
- Address: 14100 Six Mile Cypress Parkway; Fort Myers, FL 33912
- Coordinates: 26°32′18″N 81°50′31″W
- Owner: City of Fort Myers
- Operator: Lee County
- Capacity: 9,300
- Surface: Grass
- Field size: Left: 330 ft (100 m); Center: 405 ft (123 m); Right: 330 ft (100 m)

Construction
- Groundbreaking: May 15, 1989
- Opened: March 7, 1991
- Renovated: 2014–2015
- Cost: $14 million ($33.1 million in 2025 dollars)
- Architects: Lescher & Mahoney; Ellerbe Becket; Populous (renovation)
- Structural engineers: Bliss & Nyitray, Inc
- General contractor: Case Contracting Company

Tenants
- Minnesota Twins (MLB spring training) (1991–present); Fort Myers Mighty Mussels (FSL) (1992–present); FCL Twins (FCL) (1991–present)

Hammond Stadium is a baseball field located in the Lee Health Sports Complex in South Fort Myers, Florida, United States. The stadium was built in 1991, and underwent major renovations in 2014 and 2015.

As the spring training home of the Minnesota Twins, it saw its seating capacity increased from 7,500 to 9,300 in the spring of 2015. Class A Advanced affiliate, the Fort Myers Mighty Mussels (then the Fort Myers Miracle), of the Florida State League finished out their 2014 season and FSL championship at JetBlue Park (Spring home of the Boston Red Sox, also in Fort Myers) in order to get the renovations done in time for catchers & pitchers to report in 2015. The renovations will also increase the amount of walkable area, provide more shaded areas for sunny games and an expanded gift shop, among other amenities for fans and players.

The Twins' Rookie League affiliate, the Gulf Coast League Twins also play in the Lee Health Sports Complex (formerly CenturyLink Sports Complex), however, not usually at Hammond Stadium, but rather at the fields within the surrounding complex.

The stadium is named in honor of retired Lee County Deputy Administrator William H. Hammond Jr., who was instrumental in getting the Lee County Sports Complex (the name it was given prior to its renovations) built to draw the Twins from their previous Spring home in Orlando. Hammond Stadium's outer facade was designed with Churchill Downs in mind. The parking rows all feature streets signs named to honor former Twins greats—including Bert Blyleven, Kirby Puckett, and Kent Hrbek. There is also a waterfall fountain near the stadium's entrance.

The Twins won the World Series following their first spring training in Hammond Stadium. Their agreement with Lee County for use of the complex originally ran through 2012; the Twins then signed a renewal for a 30-year period in 2014. The new lease agreement with Lee County permitted the Twins to sell the naming rights for the complex – which they did, but the contract stipulated that the stadium itself was to retain the name of Hammond Stadium.

The Florida State League held the 48th annual Florida State League All-Star Game at Hammond Stadium in June 2009. The previous time the league held their mid-summer classic in Fort Myers was 2003.

Hammond Stadium and JetBlue Park are two of four spring training facilities in Fort Myers. City of Palms Park and Terry Park Ballfield (also known as the Park T. Pigott Memorial Stadium) in East Fort Myers are currently not in use. City of Palms Park is the former spring training home of the Boston Red Sox, and Terry Park Ballfield is the former home of the Philadelphia Athletics, Cleveland Indians, Pittsburgh Pirates and Kansas City Royals.

== Field dimensions ==
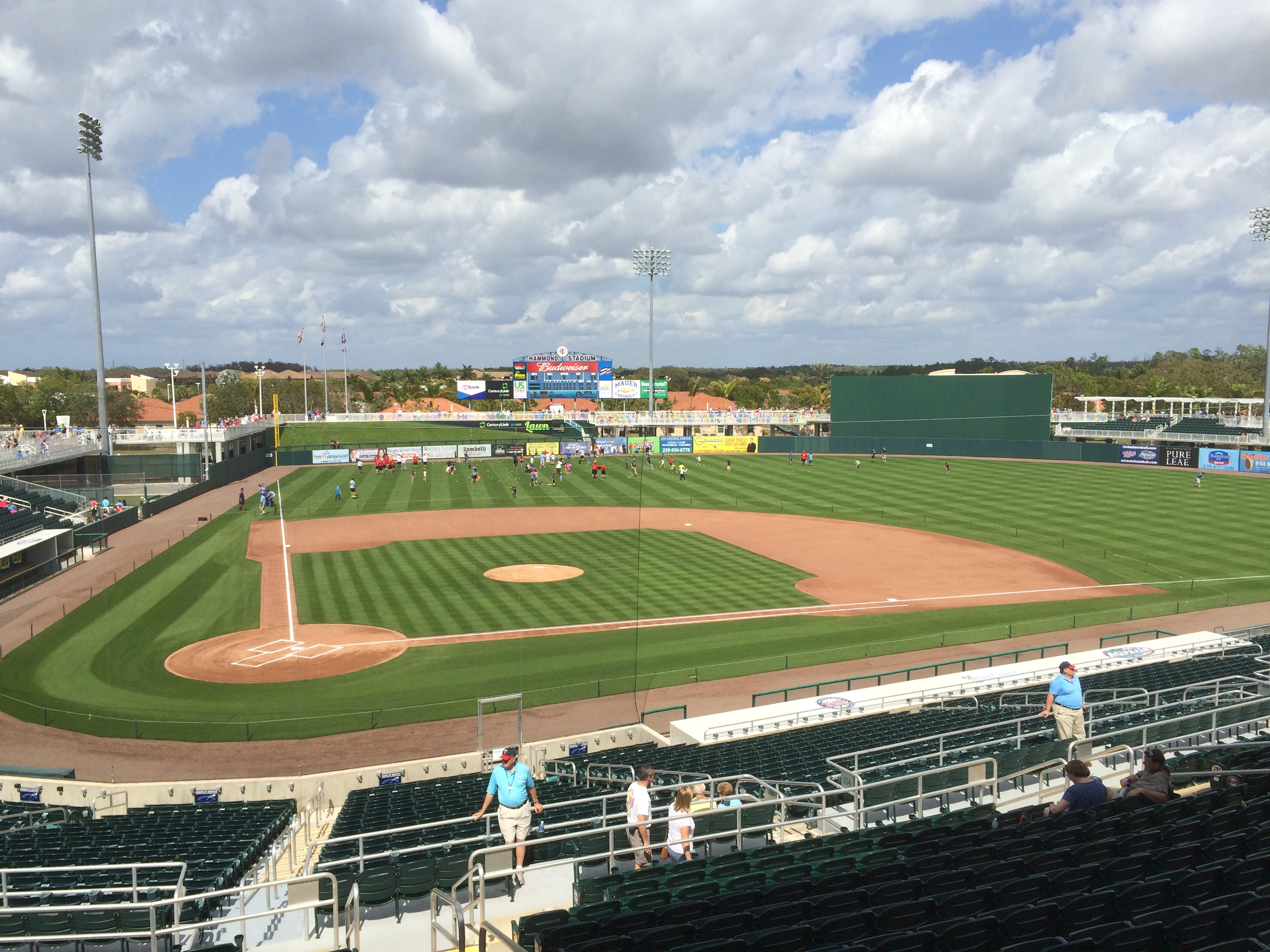
Field at Hammond Stadium

Hammond Stadium's dimensions compared to Target Field are:

Field	Hammond Stadium	Target Field
Left	330 ft (100 m)	339 ft (103 m)
Left-center	–	377 ft (115 m)
Deep left-center	–	411 ft (125 m)
Center	405 ft (123 m)	403 ft (123 m)
Right-center	–	365 ft (111 m)
Right	330 ft (100 m)	328 ft (100 m)
