= List of Boston Red Sox spring training venues =

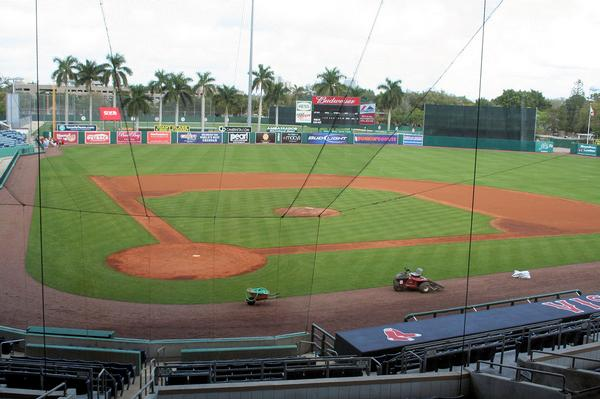
City of Palms Park, home to Red Sox spring training, 1993–2011

The Boston Red Sox have been a member of the American League (AL) of Major League Baseball (MLB) since 1901, and have held spring training prior to each season.

The franchise's first spring training was held in Charlottesville, Virginia, in 1901, when the team was known as the Boston Americans. Since 1993, the city of Fort Myers, Florida, has hosted Boston's spring training, first at City of Palms Park, and since 2012 at JetBlue Park at Fenway South.

== List of Boston Red Sox spring training venues ==
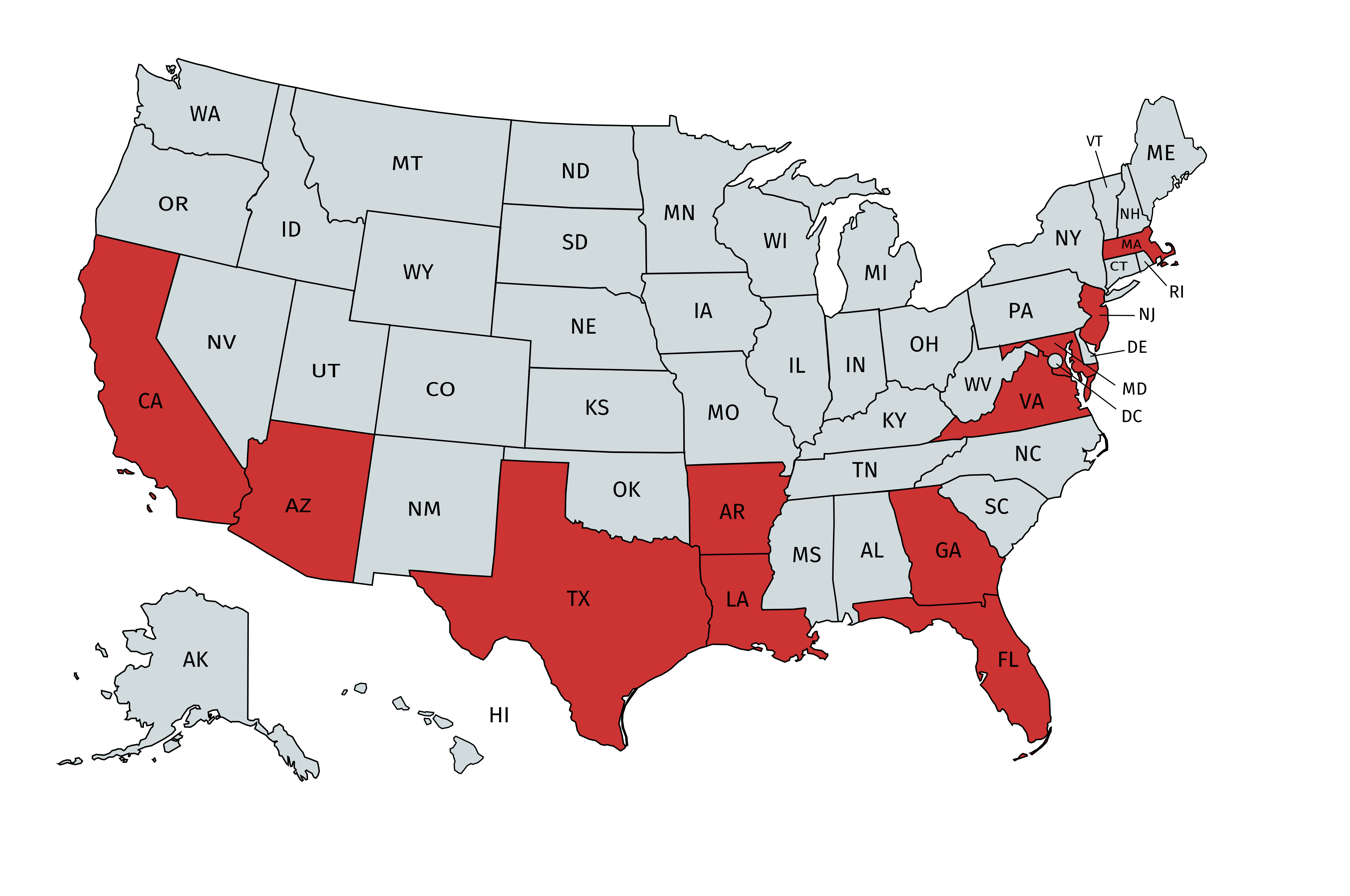
States where the Red Sox have held spring training

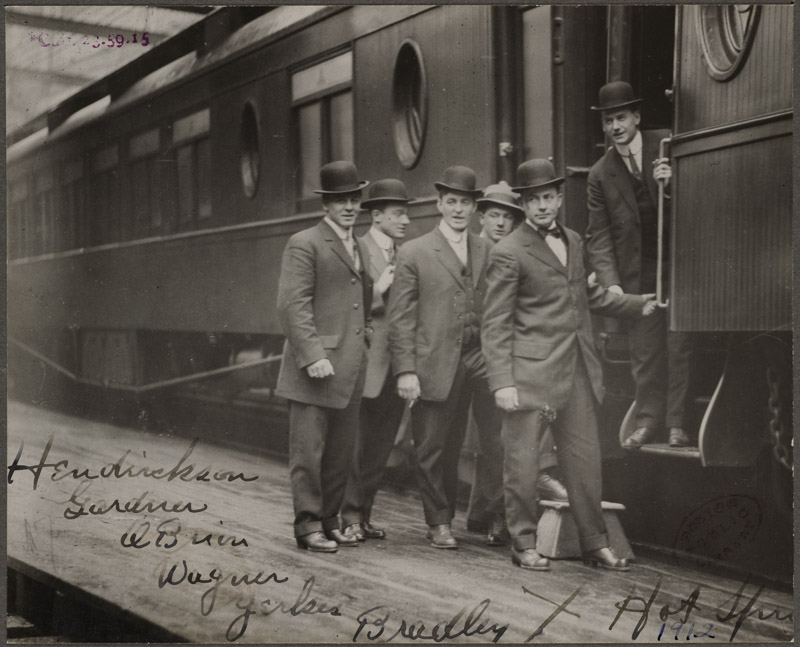
Red Sox players in Hot Springs, Arkansas, in 1912

| Year(s) | City | Ballpark | Ref. |
|---|---|---|---|
| 1901 | Charlottesville, Virginia | | |
| 1902 | Augusta, Georgia | Warren Park | |
| 1903–1906 | Macon, Georgia | Central City Park | |
| 1907–1908 | Little Rock, Arkansas | West End Park | |
| 1909–1910 | Hot Springs, Arkansas | Majestic Park | |
| 1911 | Redondo Beach, California | | |
| 1912–1918 | Hot Springs, Arkansas | Majestic Park | |
| 1919 | Tampa, Florida | Plant Field | |
| 1920–1923 | Hot Springs, Arkansas | Whittington Park | |
| 1924 | San Antonio, Texas | League Park | |
| 1925–1927 | New Orleans, Louisiana | Heinemann Park | |
| 1928–1929 | Bradenton, Florida | Ninth Street Park | |
| 1930–1931 | Pensacola, Florida | Legion Field | |
| 1932 | Savannah, Georgia | Municipal Stadium | |
| 1933–1942 | Sarasota, Florida | Payne Park | |
| 1943 | Medford, Massachusetts | Tufts University | |
| 1944 | Baltimore, Maryland | Oriole Park | |
| 1945 | Pleasantville, New Jersey | Ansley Park | |
| 1946–1958 | Sarasota, Florida | Payne Park | |
| 1959–1965 | Scottsdale, Arizona | Scottsdale Stadium | |
| 1966–1992 | Winter Haven, Florida | Chain of Lakes Park | |
| 1993–2011 | Fort Myers, Florida | City of Palms Park | |
| 2012–present (Note: In July 2020, the team resumed preseason training activities with a "summer camp" at Fenway Park, due to the early termination of traditional spring training that had been caused by the COVID-19 pandemic.) | Fort Myers, Florida | JetBlue Park at Fenway South | |

== Notable events ==
In 1918, Babe Ruth hit a 573-foot home run during spring training in Hot Springs, Arkansas.

Norman Rockwell's 1957 painting The Rookie is set in the team's spring training locker room, which at the time was located at Payne Park in Sarasota, Florida.

In 1987, unhappy about his contract, pitcher Roger Clemens left spring training in Winter Haven, Florida, which prompted general manager Lou Gorman to quip, "The sun will rise, the sun will set, and I'll have lunch."

In 1988, presidential candidate Michael Dukakis took batting practice in Winter Haven.

In March 2020, due to impact of the COVID-19 pandemic on sports, all MLB spring training was halted and the start of the regular season was delayed. Three months later, team president Sam Kennedy advised that the team would complete its preseason training activities at Fenway Park, upon resumption of preparations for the 2020 MLB season. The Red Sox organization made multiple changes to Fenway Park to accommodate "summer camp", including the use of luxury suites as alternate dressing rooms for players, and adding an additional bullpen area underneath the centerfield bleachers. In 2021, the team returned to JetBlue Park for spring training.
