= Florida Complex League Red Sox =

American professional baseball team

- Founded in 1989; Fort Myers, Florida; Winter Haven, Florida (1989–1992)

| Team logo | Cap insignia |

Minor league affiliations
- Class: Rookie league
- League: Florida Complex League (2021–present)
- Division: South Division
- Previous leagues: Gulf Coast League (1989–2020)

Major league affiliations
- Team: Boston Red Sox (1989–present)

Minor league titles
- League titles (3): 2006; 2014; 2015
- Division titles (12): 1991; 2001; 2003; 2004; 2005; 2006; 2012; 2013; 2014; 2015; 2016; 2018
- Wild card berths (1): 2022

Team data
- Name: FCL Red Sox
- Previous names: GCL Red Sox (1989–2020)
- Ballpark: JetBlue Park at Fenway South
- Previous parks: City of Palms Park (1993–2011)
- Owner/ Operator: Boston Red Sox
- General manager: Todd Stephenson
- Manager: Tom Kotchman

The Florida Complex League Red Sox are a professional baseball team competing in the rookie-level Florida Complex League (FCL) of Minor League Baseball. The team is owned and operated by the Boston Red Sox of Major League Baseball (MLB). Prior to 2021, the team was known as the Gulf Coast League Red Sox. The team is located in Fort Myers, Florida, and plays its home games at JetBlue Park in the Fenway South complex.

The team is composed mainly of players who are in their first year of professional baseball, either as draftees or non-drafted free agents from the United States, Canada, the Dominican Republic and Venezuela, among other countries. Injured players from the major-league Red Sox and their minor-league system occasionally play rookie-level games as their first step on a rehabilitation assignment.

== History ==
In 1988, the Boston Red Sox and Seattle Mariners fielded a cooperative rookie-level team in the Arizona League (AZL), known as the AZL Mariners/Red Sox. The cooperative was not renewed beyond that single season.

In 1989, the Red Sox began fielding their own rookie-level team in the Gulf Coast League (GCL). The team first played in Winter Haven, Florida, moved to City of Palms Park in Fort Myers in 1993, then moved to its current facility in 2012. Prior to the 2021 season, the Gulf Coast League was renamed as the Florida Complex League (FCL).

=== Notable players ===
At least one National Baseball Hall of Fame inductee has played for the team, Jeff Bagwell in 1989. Various players who have been MLB All-Stars have played for the team; those who were selected as All-Stars multiple times in their careers include: Carl Crawford, Carl Everett, Nomar Garciaparra, Jon Lester, Hanley Ramírez, Anthony Rizzo, and Chris Sale.

== Yearly team records ==
The team has finished first in its division 12 times, most recently in 2018. The team has won the league championship three times: 2006, 2014, and 2015. The team's best record came in 2015 when the club was 41–17, a .707 winning percentage.

| Season | Division | W | L | Pct. | Division finish | League rank | Manager | Playoffs |
|---|---|---|---|---|---|---|---|---|
| 1989 | Northern | 27 | 36 | .429 | 5th | 10th (t) | Sam Mejías | |
| 1990 | North | 34 | 29 | .524 | 3rd | 5th | Félix Maldonado | |
| 1991 | Northern | 33 | 27 | .550 | 1st | 2nd | Félix Maldonado | Lost in first round vs. GCL Expos (1 game to 0) |
| 1992 | Central | 18 | 41 | .305 | 5th | 15th | Frank White | |
| 1993 | Western | 32 | 28 | .533 | 3rd | 6th (t) | Félix Maldonado | |
| 1994 | Western | 40 | 20 | .667 | 2nd | 3rd | Félix Maldonado | |
| 1995 | Southwest | 21 | 36 | .368 | 3rd | 13th | Félix Maldonado | |
| 1996 | Southwest | 24 | 36 | .400 | 4th | 14th | Bob Geren | |
| 1997 | Northwest | 31 | 28 | .525 | 3rd | 5th (t) | Luis Aguayo | |
| 1998 | Western | 27 | 37 | .450 | 5th | 10th | Luis Aguayo | |
| 1999 | Western | 30 | 29 | .508 | 4th | 7th | John Sanders | |
| 2000 | Western | 29 | 26 | .527 | 3rd | 7th | John Sanders | |
| 2001 | Western | 37 | 22 | .627 | 1st | 2nd | John Sanders | Lost in first round vs. GCL Yankees (1 game to 0) |
| 2002 | Southern | 26 | 34 | .433 | 5th | 11th | John Sanders | |
| 2003 | Southern | 33 | 26 | .559 | 1st | 3rd | Ralph Treuel | Lost in first round vs. GCL Braves (1 game to 0) |
| 2004 | Southern | 34 | 24 | .586 | 1st | 4th | Ralph Treuel | Lost League Finals vs. GCL Yankees (2 game to 0); Won in first round vs. GCL Mets (1 game to 0) |
| 2005 | Southern | 30 | 24 | .556 | 1st | 3rd | Ralph Treuel | Lost in final round vs. GCL Yankees (1 game to 0) |
| 2006 | South | 35 | 19 | .648 | 1st | 1st | Dave Tomlin | League champions vs. GCL Dodgers (2 games to 1) |
| 2007 | Southern | 30 | 26 | .536 | 3rd | 7th | Dave Tomlin | |
| 2008 | South | 28 | 27 | .509 | 3rd | 8th | Dave Tomlin | |
| 2009 | South | 26 | 27 | .491 | 4th | 10th | Dave Tomlin | |
| 2010 | South | 31 | 28 | .525 | 2nd | 5th (t) | Dave Tomlin | |
| 2011 | South | 27 | 33 | .450 | 3rd | 11th | George Lombard | |
| 2012 | South | 34 | 26 | .567 | 1st | 4th | George Lombard | Lost League Finals vs. GCL Pirates (2 games to 0); Won in first round vs. GCL Tigers (1 game to 0) |
| 2013 | South | 35 | 25 | .583 | 1st | 3rd | Darren Fenster | Lost League Finals vs. GCL Nationals (2 games to 0); Won in first round vs. GCL Yankees 2 (1 game to 0) |
| 2014 | South | 36 | 24 | .600 | 1st | 4th | Tom Kotchman | League champions vs. GCL Yankees 1 (2 games to 1); Won in first round vs. GCL Cardinals (1 game to 0) |
| 2015 | South | 41 | 17 | .707 | 1st | 1st | Tom Kotchman | League champions vs. GCL Blue Jays (2 games to 0); Won in first round vs. GCL Cardinals (1 game to 0) |
| 2016 | South | 33 | 28 | .541 | 1st | 5th | Tom Kotchman | Lost in first round vs. GCL Cardinals (1 game to 0) |
| 2017 | South | 27 | 31 | .466 | 4th | 14th | Tom Kotchman | |
| 2018 | South | 33 | 22 | .600 | 1st | 3rd | Tom Kotchman | Lost in first round vs. GCL Tigers West (1 game to 0) |
| 2019 | South | 27 | 25 | .519 | 3rd | 9th | Tom Kotchman | Playoffs cancelled due to Hurricane Dorian |
| 2020 | South | season cancelled, COVID-19 pandemic | | | | | Tom Kotchman | |
| 2021 | South | 37 | 20 | .649 | 2nd | 5th | Tom Kotchman | |
| 2022 | South | 35 | 20 | .636 | 2nd | 3rd | Jimmy Gonzalez; Tom Kotchman | |

== Roster ==
Florida Complex League Red Sox roster
| Players | Coaches/Other |
|---|---|
| Pitchers: 12 Merlin Bido; 31 Yander Bonaci; 57 Rony Calderon; 92 Yoelvin Chirino; 71 Christopher Cordero; 76 Yomar De La Rosa; 23 Sabdiel Delzine; 53 Matt Duffy #; 10 Juanyerlin Duran; 28 Jakson Gamboa; 64 Angelo Ladera; 59 Williams Montero; 52 Trennor O'Donnell #; 78 Berny Ortiz; 99 Jeison Payano; 19 Carter Rasmussen; 84 Denison Sanchez; 39 Eddison Septimo; 22 Yoandys Veraza; Catchers: 61 Alexander Mambel; 77 Liosward Marin; 13 Franklin Primera; 81 Jorge Rodriguez; Infielders: 2 Christopher Alvarado; 16 Jhorman Bravo; 25 Edwin Darville; 7 Hector Ramos; 17 Dorian Soto; Outfielders: 15 Tavano Baker; 43 Josue Brito; 48 Jostin Ogando; 32 Jhoan Peguero; 11 Harold Rivas | Manager: 24 Chase Illig; Coaches: 37 Oscar Lira (pitching); 88 Michael McCormick (pitching); 75 Wade Satzinger (hitting); 22 Steven Su (defensive); 36 Junior Zamora (hitting); 60-day injured list: -- Fabian Bonilla; -- Cade Fisher; 7-day injured list; * On Boston Red Sox 40-man roster; ~ Development list; # Rehab assignment; ∞ Reserve list; ‡ Restricted list; § Suspended list; † Temporarily inactive list; Roster updated June 19, 2026; Transactions; → More rosters: MiLB • Florida Complex League; → Boston Red Sox minor league players |
