= George Lombard =

American baseball player and coach (born 1975)

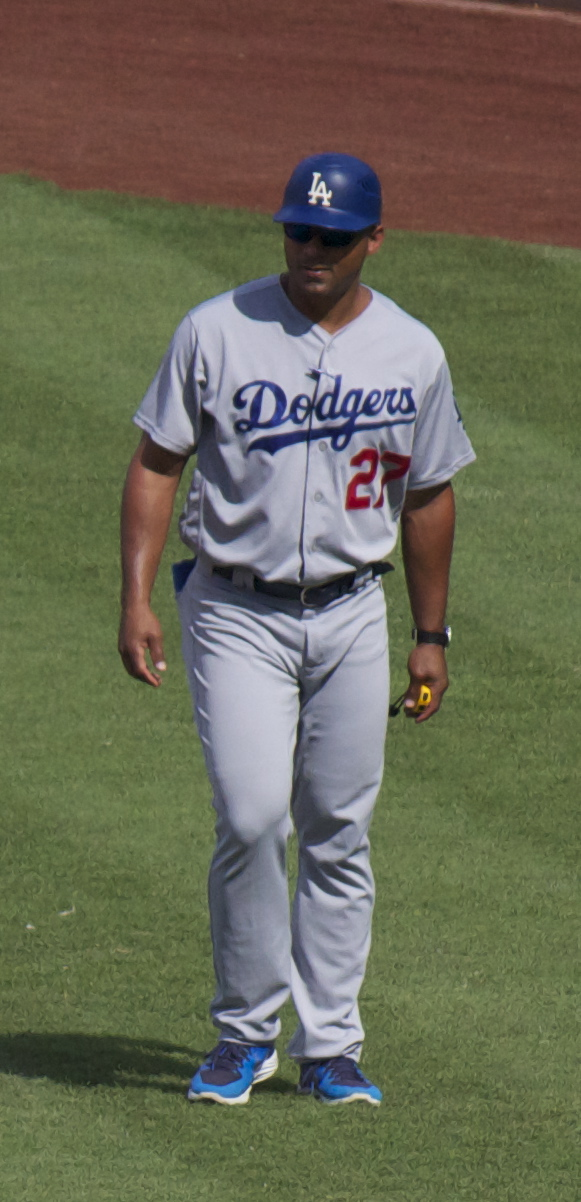
- Lombard with the Los Angeles Dodgers in 2017

Detroit Tigers – No. 26
- Outfielder / Coach
- Born: September 14, 1975 (age 50); Atlanta, Georgia, U.S.
- Batted: Left Threw: Right

MLB debut
- September 4, 1998, for the Atlanta Braves

Last MLB appearance
- October 1, 2006, for the Washington Nationals

MLB statistics
- Batting average: .220
- Home runs: 8
- Runs batted in: 21
- Stats at Baseball Reference

Teams
- As player: Atlanta Braves (1998–2000); Detroit Tigers (2002); Tampa Bay Devil Rays (2003); Washington Nationals (2006); As coach: Los Angeles Dodgers (2016–2020); Detroit Tigers (2021–present)

Career highlights and awards
- World Series champion (2020)

George Alexander Lombard Sr. (born September 14, 1975) is an American professional baseball coach and former outfielder who is the bench coach for the Detroit Tigers of Major League Baseball (MLB).

Lombard, a Parade All America and USA Today All America high school running back, had initially committed to play football for the Georgia Bulldogs before changing his plans in favor of playing baseball. Lombard earned his bachelor's degree in psychology from the University of Phoenix in 2015.

== Baseball career ==
=== Playing career ===
Lombard played baseball and football at The Lovett School in Atlanta. He initially committed to play college football for the Georgia Bulldogs. Lombard was drafted in the second round by the Atlanta Braves in the 1994 Major League Baseball draft. He signed for $425,000. He played for the Braves, Detroit Tigers, Tampa Bay Devil Rays, and Washington Nationals. In 2002, in 241 at-bats he batted .241/.300/.373 for Detroit with five home runs and 13 stolen bases. In his major league career, in 350 at-bats he batted .220 with eight home runs and stole 23 bases in 25 attempts.

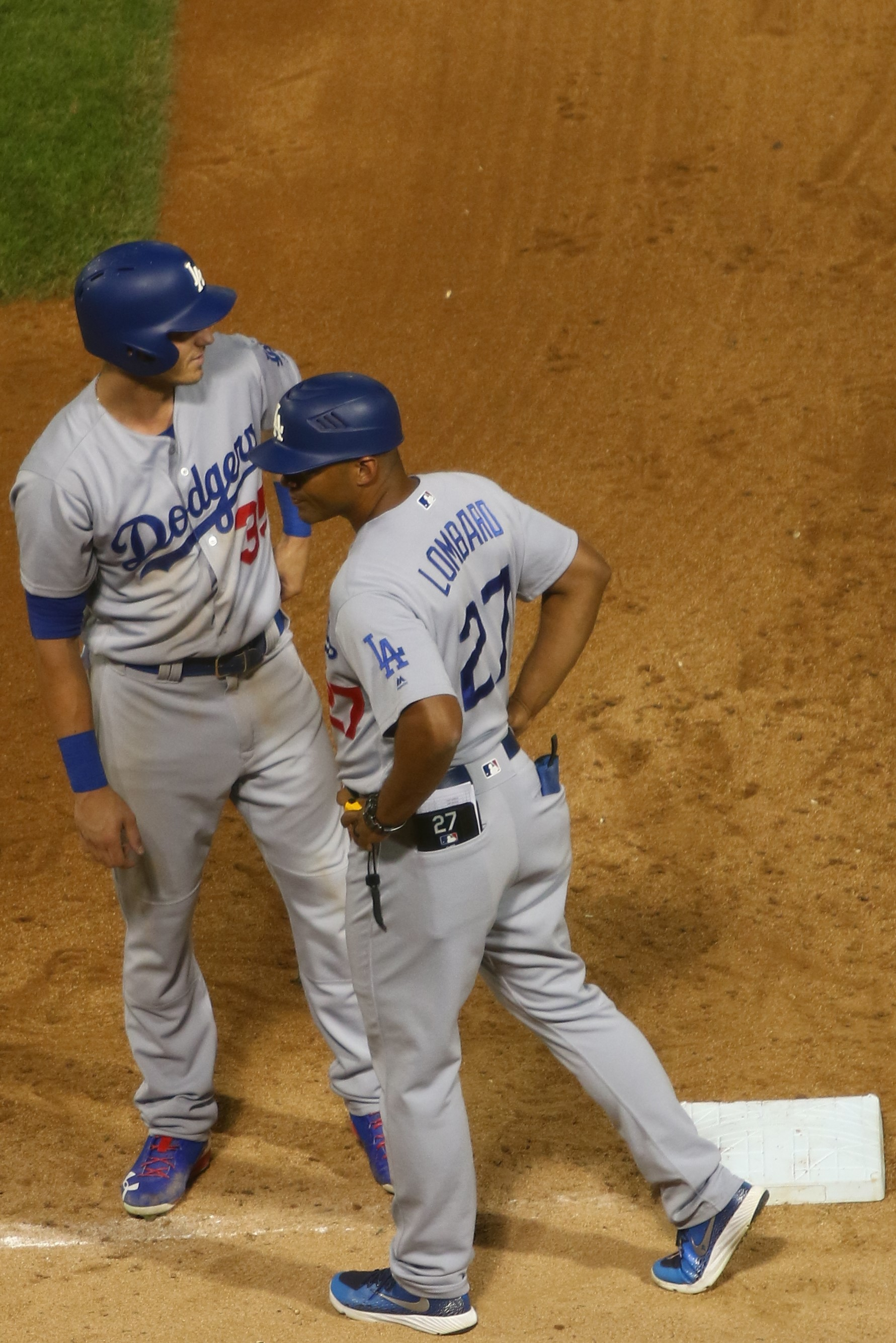
Lombard with Cody Bellinger in 2017

He was the first American baseball player to hit a home run in China during the MLB China Series on March 15, 2008. During the 2008–2009 offseason, Lombard signed a minor league contract with the Cleveland Indians. On July 4, 2009, Lombard was released by the Indians.

=== Post-playing career ===
Lombard spent 2010 as the hitting coach for the Lowell Spinners, Short-Season A affiliate of the Boston Red Sox and served as manager of the Rookie-level Gulf Coast Red Sox in 2011–2012. His teams compiled a 61–59 (.508) overall record, with the 2012 team winning the GCL's South Division. In December 2012, Lombard was promoted by the Red Sox to roving outfield and baserunning coordinator throughout the team's minor league farm system.

He was hired by the Braves in September 2015 to fill the same role and to serve as overall minor league field coordinator in the Atlanta player development system.

On December 17, 2015, it was announced that Lombard would be joining the Los Angeles Dodgers as first base coach, a position he held through the 2020 season. The Dodgers played in three World Series during that time, winning one of them.

On November 7, 2020, Lombard was named the bench coach for the Detroit Tigers.

== Personal life ==
Lombard is of biracial heritage and was born and raised in Atlanta, Georgia. His mother, Posy Lombard of Weston, Massachusetts, was a notable civil rights activist and associate of Dr. Martin Luther King Jr. She is commemorated on the "In Memory" page of the Civil Rights Movement Archive. His maternal grandfather, George Francis Fabyan Lombard, taught at the Harvard Business School for 41 years and was the school's former senior dean and professor of human relations.

Lombard has two sons, George Jr. and Jacob, both of whom are shortstops. George Jr. was drafted in the first round of the 2023 MLB draft by the New York Yankees; he joined the major league club in August 2026. Jacob was drafted in the first round of the 2026 MLB draft by the Miami Marlins.

Sporting positions
Preceded by Dave Tomlin	Gulf Coast League Red Sox manager 2011–2012	Succeeded by Darren Fenster
Preceded by Davey Lopes	Los Angeles Dodgers first base coach 2016–2020	Succeeded by Clayton McCullough
