= Félix Maldonado =

Puerto Rican baseball manager

Felix Juan Maldonado
- Born: May 24, 1938; Ponce, Puerto Rico
- Died: June 12, 2010 (aged 72); Ft. Myers, Florida
- Occupation: Baseball manager

Felix Juan "Felo" Maldonado (May 24, 1938 – June 12, 2010) was a scout and player development official for the Boston Red Sox of Major League Baseball. A 48-year veteran of the Red Sox organization starting as a minor league outfielder after being traded to the club during the 1963 season, he went on to become a minor league manager in the farm system.

== Early years ==
Maldonado was born in Barrio San Antón, Ponce, Puerto Rico, on May 24, 1938. He was the son of Caro Maldonado. He graduated from Ponce High School and the Pontifical Catholic University of Puerto Rico.

== Track and field ==
Maldonado was also an accomplished track and field athlete. In 1956, he became the first Puerto Rican high school student to run the 800m in less than two minutos, and second only to Olympic medal-winner George Kerr. At Ponce High he won all the track and field events including 200m, 400m, and 800m, as well as 4 × 400 m relay and 4 × 800 m relay.

== Baseball career ==
Maldonado's entry into professional baseball occurred in 1958 when Pedrin Zorrilla signed him with the Santurce Crabbers. He played 13 seasons, winning five championships.

As a baseball player, the 5 ft 10 in (1.78 m), 165 lb (75 kg) Maldonado threw and batted right-handed. He signed with the San Francisco Giants in 1959 and had two stellar seasons while a member of the Giant farm system — 1960 with the Eugene Emeralds of the Class B Northwest League and 1962 with the El Paso Sun Kings of the Double-A Texas League, batting .334 and .326 respectively. All told, he played for 12 minor league seasons (including 2 1/2 years at Triple-A) and batted .281 with 1,267 hits in 4,503 at bats.

From 1971 to 1988, Maldonado spent 18 years as an amateur scout for the Boston Red Sox in his native Puerto Rico. He then worked as a manager of Red Sox farm clubs for seven years (1989–95), six at the Rookie level and one in Class A, compiling a record of 238–262 (.476) in an even 500 games managed. From 1996 to 2002, he was an instructor and Latin American coordinator of instruction for Boston's minor league system and became a player development consultant in 2003.

Maldonado also worked as coach for the Ponce Lions and the Mayagüez Indians.

== Death and legacy ==
Maldonado died of cancer June 12, 2010, at his home in Fort Myers, Florida. He was interred at Cementerio La Piedad in his hometown of Ponce, Puerto Rico. He was inducted into the Puerto Rico Baseball Hall of Fame in 2009. A practice field at Boston's Fort Myers spring training facility is named in his honor.

Sporting positions
Preceded by Sam Mejías	Gulf Coast League Red Sox manager 1990–1991	Succeeded by Frank White
Preceded by Frank White	Gulf Coast League Red Sox manager 1993–1995	Succeeded by Bob Geren
