= Razor Shines =

American baseball player and coach (born 1956)

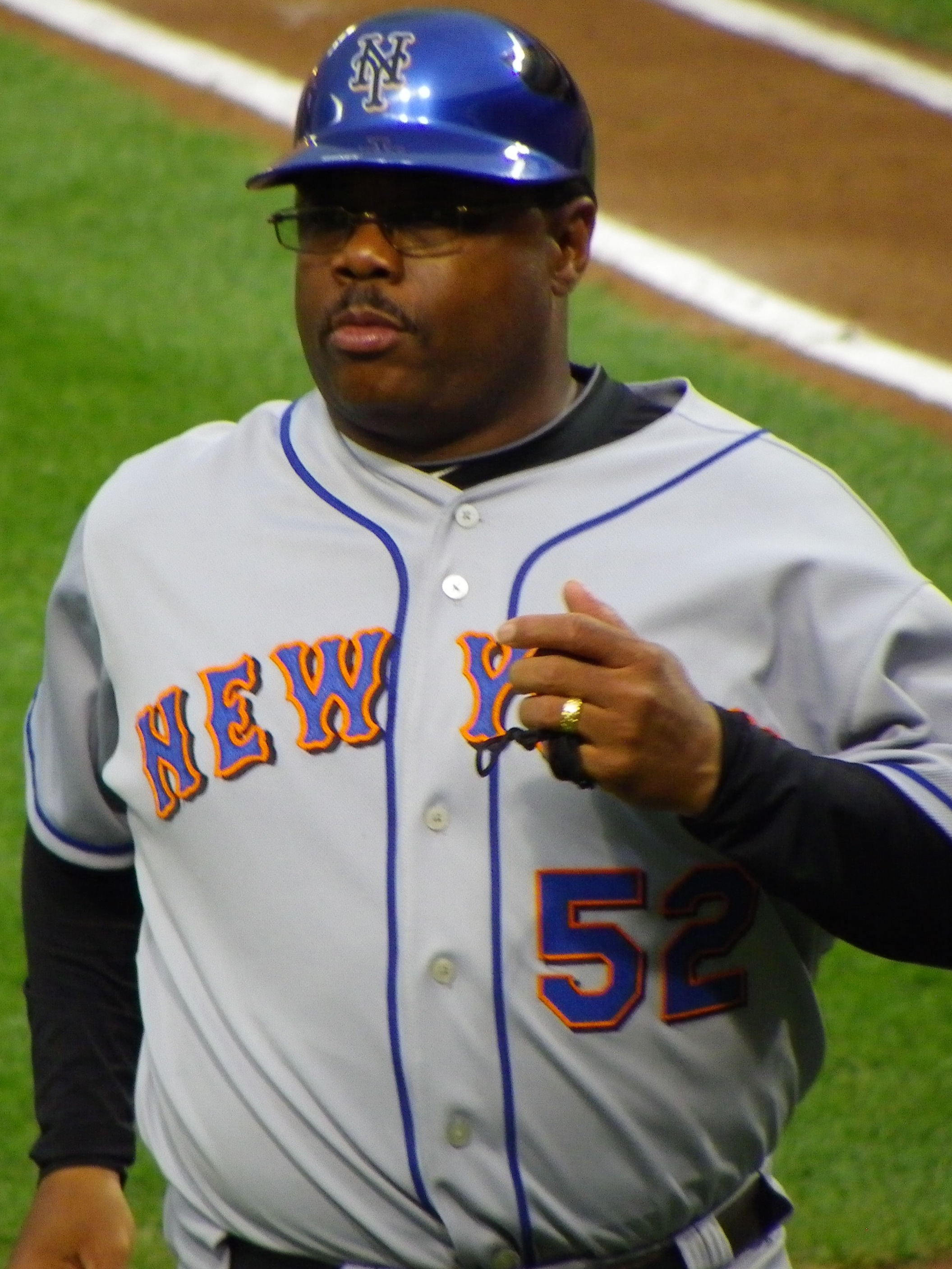
- Shines with the New York Mets in 2010
- First baseman / Coach
- Born: July 18, 1956 (age 69); Durham, North Carolina, U.S.
- Batted: Both Threw: Right

MLB debut
- September 9, 1983, for the Montreal Expos

Last MLB appearance
- May 14, 1987, for the Montreal Expos

MLB statistics
- Batting average: .185
- Home runs: 0
- Runs batted in: 5
- Stats at Baseball Reference

Teams
- As player: Montreal Expos (1983–1985, 1987); As coach: Chicago White Sox (2007); New York Mets (2009–2010)

Anthony Razor Shines (born July 18, 1956) is an American former professional baseball player and coach. He played in Major League Baseball (MLB) during parts of four seasons for the Montreal Expos, primarily as a first baseman. He later served as a base coach for the Chicago White Sox and New York Mets.

== Career ==
=== Playing career ===
Shines was born in Durham, North Carolina. He was drafted by the Montreal Expos in the 18th round of the 1978 MLB draft out of St. Augustine's College in Raleigh, North Carolina.

The Expos assigned him to the Jamestown Expos in the New York–Penn League for his first season in 1978. He spent the next three seasons (1979–1981) with the West Palm Beach Expos of the Florida State League. Shines was promoted to the Memphis Chicks of the Southern League in 1981 and remained there through 1983, when he was promoted to the AAA Wichita Aeros of the American Association.

He made his Major League debut on September 9, 1983, as a pinch hitter against the New York Mets but did not get an official appearance because the Mets made a pitching change and he was subsequently pinch hit for himself. He played in two more games that season, as late inning defensive replacement against the Chicago Cubs on September 12 and as a pinch hitter on October 2 against the Mets. He recorded his first Major League hit in that at-bat, a single to left field off Tim Leary.

In parts of four Major League seasons with the Expos he played in 68 games and had 81 at bats, 15 hits, one double, five RBI, one stolen base, five walks, a .185 batting average, .239 on-base percentage, .198 slugging percentage, 16 total bases and one sacrifice fly. He also pitched an inning in a blowout loss to the Philadelphia Phillies in 1985. Shines reached base twenty-one times in his Major League career without scoring a run, a record which still stands as of April 2024.

He spent the majority of nine seasons with the Indianapolis Indians, becoming a local legend and fan favorite within the city of Indianapolis.

He became a free agent in 1990 and signed with the Pittsburgh Pirates, who sent him to the Buffalo Bisons, where he hit .170 in 42 games. When the Pirates released him during the season, he signed with the Mexico City Reds of the Mexican League.

He retired after spending 1993 in the Cincinnati Reds system.

On May 16, 2006, the Indianapolis Indians honored Shines, who was managing the visiting Charlotte Knights, with a "Razor Shines Night." Shines kept his residence in Indianapolis during his playing years and for a few years afterwards. After retirement, he began his coaching career there at a local baseball academy and at Bishop Chatard High School. Shines also coached at Lebanon High School in Lebanon, Indiana, in the 1997–1998 season.

On September 13, 2024, the Indianapolis Indians retired Shines' jersey number 3 and to date is the first and only former Indians player to be so honored in the 100+ year history of the franchise.

=== Coaching and managing career ===
He later became a minor league manager, where he managed the Birmingham Barons of the Southern League and the Clearwater Threshers of the Florida State League.

Shines has over 500 wins as a minor league manager.

In 2007, he was back in Major League Baseball, coaching at third base for the Chicago White Sox.

On December 12, 2007, Shines was named manager of the Phillies single-A Clearwater Threshers team. He managed the Threshers to a 64–76 record in 2008.

Shines served as the first base coach for the New York Mets for the 2009 and 2010 seasons. In 2011, he was replaced by Mookie Wilson. In 2012, he was the hitting coach for the Great Lakes Loons, the A team of the Los Angeles Dodgers. In 2013, he became the manager of the Loons and in 2014 he was promoted to manager of the Chattanooga Lookouts in the Double-A Southern League. The Dodgers switched Double-A affiliates for 2015, and Shines became the manager of the Tulsa Drillers of the Texas League. Despite being chosen by Baseball America as the best managerial prospect in the Texas League, Shines' contract was not renewed by the Dodgers after the season.

== Personal ==
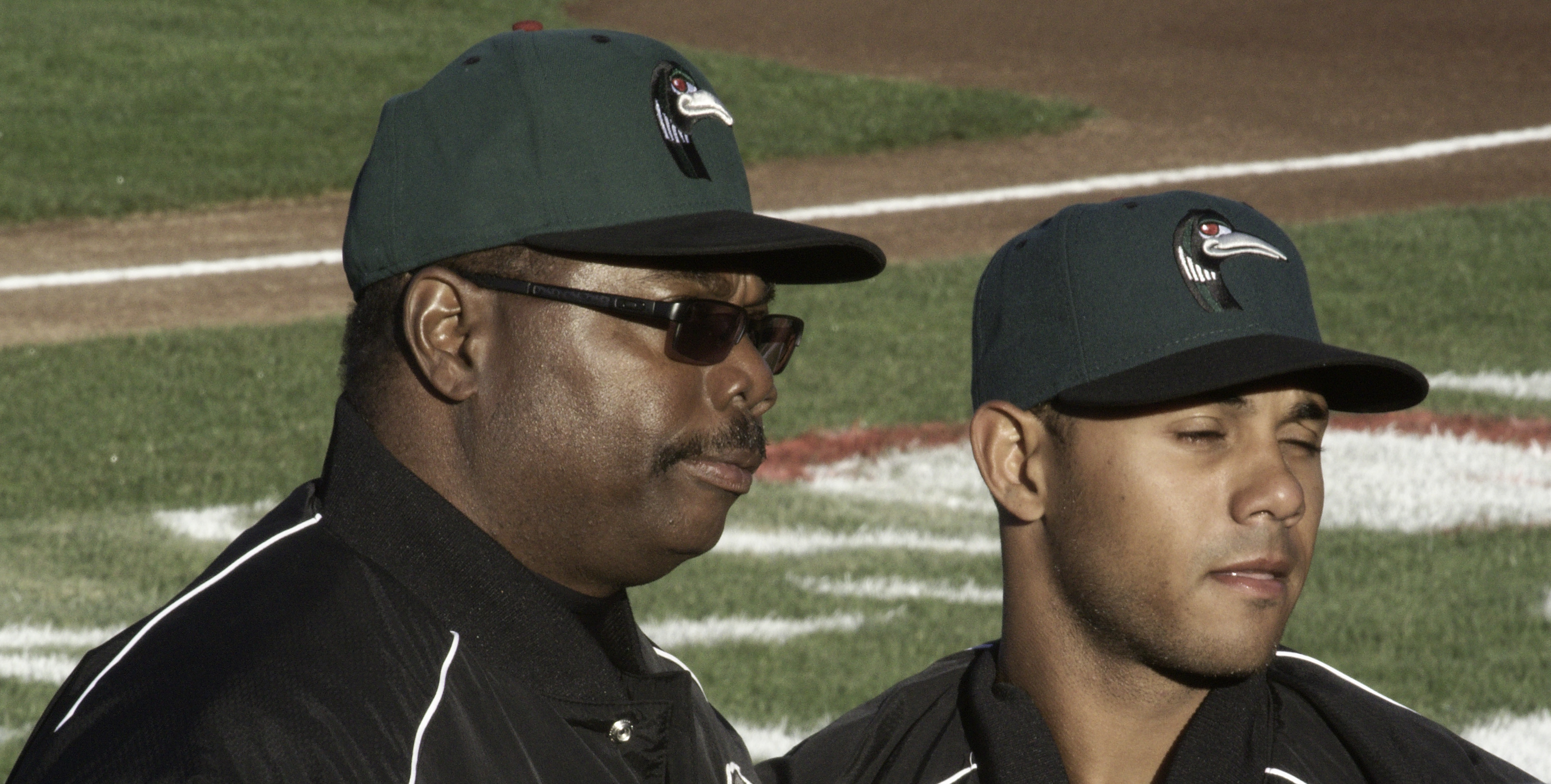
Razor and Devin Shines with the Great Lakes Loons in 2012

His son, Devin, played baseball for the Cowboys at Oklahoma State and was drafted by the Dodgers in the 38th round of the 2011 MLB draft. In 2012, Devin played for his dad with the Great Lakes Loons.

In 2009, Shines was named by Maxim as having "the most bad-ass name of all time". "Razor" is a family name. It was his grandfather's middle name and his father's middle name. His son's middle name is also "Razor."

Shines became a spokesman for Aquafina water during the 2009 season and was featured on its website as "The 3rd Base Coach of Life." Visitors to the site could ask yes or no questions and receive "advice" from Shines.

== Sources ==
Preceded by Joey Cora	Chicago White Sox third base coach 2007	Succeeded by Jeff Cox
Preceded by Luis Aguayo	New York Mets third base coach 2009	Succeeded by Chip Hale
Preceded by Luis Alicea	New York Mets first base coach 2010	Succeeded by Mookie Wilson
Preceded by Jody Reed	Chattanooga Lookouts Manager; 2014	Succeeded by Doug Mientkiewicz
