= Tom Kotchman =

American baseball manager/scout/coach (born 1954)

- Manager / Scout
- Born: August 14, 1954 (age 71); Grafton, North Dakota, U.S.
- Bats: Right Throws: Right
- Stats at Baseball Reference

John Thomas Kotchman (born August 14, 1954) is an American former professional baseball infielder, scout, coach and minor-league manager. Kotchman spent 48 years in organized baseball, the majority of them in the minor-league organizations of the Los Angeles Angels and Boston Red Sox.

In his final position, he spent a decade (2014–2019, 2021–2024) as the manager of Boston's rookie-level affiliate, currently known as the Florida Complex League Red Sox. In addition, he served as a cross-checker who scouted the state of Florida for the major-league Red Sox. The 2024 season was Kotchman's 44th and last as a minor-league manager.

== Baseball career ==
=== As player ===
Kotchman attended high school in Seminole, Florida, and played baseball at Chipola Junior College in Florida and Georgia Southern University. He was signed by the Cincinnati Reds in 1977 and played two seasons (1977–1978) in their farm system at the Class A level. A third baseman, he threw and batted right-handed, stood 6 feet 1 inch (1.85 m) tall and weighed 180 pounds (82 kg). In 103 minor-league games, he had a .261 batting average with two home runs and 34 runs batted in. He played primarily as a corner infielder (54 games at third base, 35 games at first base), plus two games at second base.

=== As manager ===
Kotchman began his managerial career in 1979 at age 24 with the Auburn Redstars in the Class A Short Season New York–Penn League. The Auburn franchise lacked a Player Development Contract and was designated a "co-op" team, receiving its players on loan from multiple MLB organizations. After one season there, Kotchman became manager of affiliated farm teams. He spent 1980–1981 in the Detroit Tigers' system, as skipper of the Bristol Tigers of the rookie-level Appalachian League in 1980, then the Macon Peaches of the full-season Class A South Atlantic League in 1981. He then spent 1982–1983 as pilot of the Boston Red Sox' Class A Florida State League franchise, the Winter Haven Red Sox. At Winter Haven, he was the first manager in the professional baseball career of eventual 354-game winner and seven-time Cy Young Award recipient Roger Clemens.

==== Almost three decades with Angels ====
In 1984, Kotchman joined the player development system of the then-California Angels, beginning an association that would last through 2012 with the then-Los Angeles Angels of Anaheim.

During 1984–1986, Kotchman was manager of the Angels' Class A California League farm clubs, the Redwood Pioneers, based in Rohnert Park, California, and the Palm Springs Angels. Success there led to a promotion to the Angels' Triple-A Edmonton Trappers affiliate in the Pacific Coast League, where he also spent three seasons (1987–1989).

In 1990, Kotchman assumed a role he would play for 23 seasons, as both a Florida-based area scout and manager of the Angels' Class A Short Season or rookie-level teams in the Northwest League (NWL) and the Pioneer League. He skippered the Boise Hawks of the NWL for 11 seasons (1990–2000), during which time the Hawks never finished lower than second place and never compiled a losing record. During 2001–2012, he managed in the Pioneer League with the Provo Angels (2001–2004) and the Orem Owlz (2005–2012). As a scout, Kotchman signed such future Angels as Howie Kendrick, Jeff Mathis, Scot Shields, Bobby Wilson, and Darren O'Day.

In late October 2012, it was reported that Kotchman and the Angels had severed their longtime relationship, when he was asked to concentrate solely on scouting.

==== Return to Red Sox' system ====
The December 11, 2012, edition of Baseball America reported that Kotchman had decided to rejoin the Red Sox organization for 2013 as a Florida-area scout. The Red Sox soon announced that Kotchman would also serve as a coach for the 2013 rookie-level Gulf Coast League Red Sox.

On December 18, 2013, the Red Sox promoted Kotchman to manager of the 2014 GCL Red Sox, his 35th year as a skipper in minor league baseball. His club won the 2014 Gulf Coast League championship, the ninth league title Kotchman had won since 1990. Additionally, he was honored as manager of the year and included in the Gulf Coast League postseason all-stars team. He was reappointed skipper of the GCL Red Sox on January 8, 2015, and promoted to Florida cross-checker five days later. The 2015 GCL Red Sox won 41 of 58 regular-season games then repeated as league champions by sweeping three playoff games.

After the 2020 season was cancelled due to the COVID-19 pandemic, Kotchman was again named manager of Boston's rookie team, renamed as the Florida Complex League Red Sox for the 2021 season.

Through 2024 and 44 total seasons, Kotchman had compiled a career regular season managerial record of 2,035 victories and 1,672 defeats, a winning percentage of .549, with 10 league championships. He announced his retirement in November 2024.

=== Honors ===
In 2008, Kotchman was one of the inaugural inductees into the Professional Baseball Scouts Hall of Fame. He was the 2017 winner of Baseball America's Tony Gwynn Award for "lasting contributions to baseball."

== Personal life ==
Kotchman is the father of former MLB first basemen Casey Kotchman; his daughter Christal Kotchman was on the College of Charleston softball team.

== Sources ==
- Johnson, Lloyd; Wolff, Miles (2007). The Encyclopedia of Minor League Baseball (3rd ed.). Durham, North Carolina: Baseball America. ISBN 978-1-93-239117-6.

Sporting positions
Preceded by Winston Llenas	Edmonton Trappers manager 1987–1989	Succeeded by Mako Oliveras
New title Franchise created	Orem Owlz manager 2001–2012	Succeeded by Bill Richardson
Preceded by Darren Fenster	Gulf Coast League Red Sox manager 2014–2020	Team renamed to FCL Red Sox
New title Team renamed from GCL Red Sox	Florida Complex League Red Sox manager 2021–present	Vacant
