= Dave Tomlin =

American baseball player (born 1949)

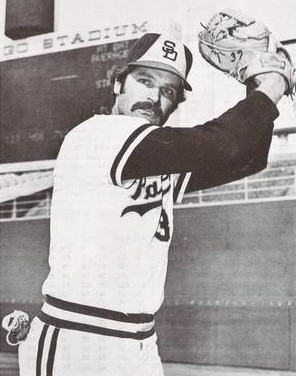
- Pitcher
- Born: June 22, 1949 (age 77); Maysville, Kentucky, U.S.
- Batted: Left Threw: Left

MLB debut
- September 2, 1972, for the Cincinnati Reds

Last MLB appearance
- August 19, 1986, for the Montreal Expos

MLB statistics
- Win–loss record: 25–12
- Earned run average: 3.82
- Strikeouts: 278
- Stats at Baseball Reference

Teams
- Cincinnati Reds (1972–1973); San Diego Padres (1974–1977); Cincinnati Reds (1978–1980); Montreal Expos (1982); Pittsburgh Pirates (1983, 1985); Montreal Expos (1986)

David Allen Tomlin (born June 22, 1949) is an American former professional baseball player. During his 13-season career in Major League Baseball, he was a relief pitcher for the Cincinnati Reds (1972–73 and 1978–80), San Diego Padres (1974–77), Montreal Expos (1982 and 1986) and Pittsburgh Pirates (1983 and 1985). He also had a lengthy post-playing career as a pitching coach in the minor leagues.

== Biography ==
=== Early years ===
Tomlin was born in Maysville, Kentucky and graduated from West Union High School in West Union, Ohio.

=== Minor leagues ===
He was drafted by the Cincinnati Reds in the 29th round of the 1967 Major League Baseball draft.

=== San Diego Padres ===
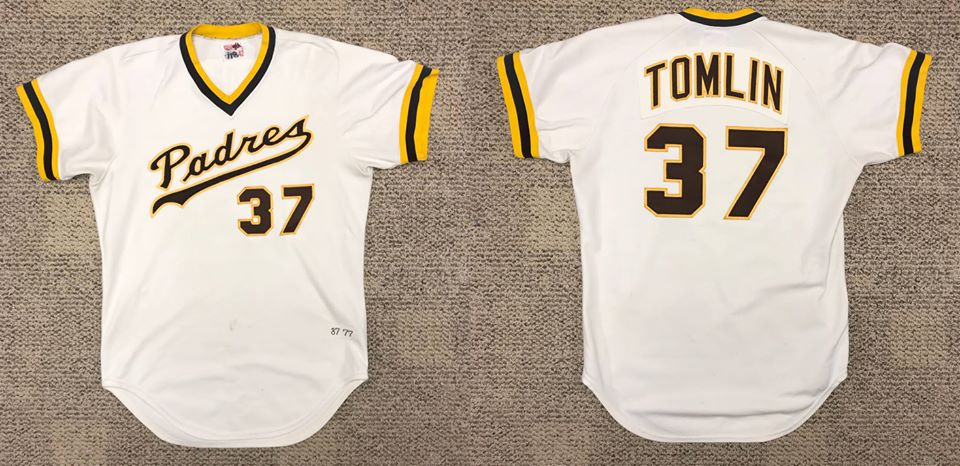
1977 San Diego Padres #37 Dave Tomlin game worn home jersey

After appearing in 19 games for Cincinnati in 1972 and 1973, Tomlin was traded (along with Bobby Tolan) to the San Diego Padres for Clay Kirby. Tomlin's lone major league start came on June 23, 1976. He appeared regularly for the Padres from 1974 to 1977, having his best two seasons of his career, based on WAR, in 1977 and 1978.

=== Cincinnati Reds ===
Tomlin was traded to the Texas Rangers after the 1978 season for Gaylord Perry, but returned to the Reds in March 1979 when they purchased his contract. He helped the Reds win the 1973 and 1979 NL West Division championships. He appeared in four National League Championship series games, one in 1973 and three in 1979, and allowed eight hits and three earned runs in 42/3 innings pitched.

=== Toronto Blue Jays ===
Cincinnati released him on September 2, 1980, and Tomlin signed with the Toronto Blue Jays before the 1981 season, but did not appear with the major league team that year. He was released by the Blue Jays before the 1982 season.

=== Montreal Expos ===
Tomlin signed as a free agent with the Reds in 1982, but did not appear with Cincinnati that year. His contract was purchased late in the season by the Montreal Expos and he appeared in one game for the 1982 Expos. In 1986, Tomlin would return to the Expos as a free agent, appearing in seven games for Montreal that year.

=== Pittsburgh Pirates ===
In 1983, the Pittsburgh Pirates purchased his contract, but released Tomlin at the end of the season and then resigned him as a free agent in 1984. Tomlin appeared in a total of six games for the Pirates over two years.

=== Career totals ===
In 13 seasons, Tomlin had a won–lost record of 25–12 in 409 games pitched, one game started, 138 games finished, 12 saves, 5111/3 innings, 543 hits allowed, 261 runs allowed, 217 earned runs allowed, 32 home runs allowed, 198 walks, 278 strikeouts, 12 wild pitches, 2,239 batters faced, 58 intentional walks, seven balks and a 3.82 earned run average.

=== Coach and manager ===
Tomlin became a pitching coach in the Montreal and Atlanta Braves organizations after his active career. He joined the Boston Red Sox in 1998 in a similar capacity, until 2006, when he was named manager of the Rookie-level Gulf Coast Red Sox of the Gulf Coast League. He served through 2010, compiling a five-year mark of 150–127 (.542), with one league championship (2006). He then shifted to a coaching position with the GCL Red Sox, working for six seasons (2011–16) in that post.

Sporting positions
Preceded by Ralph Treuel	Gulf Coast League Red Sox manager 2006–2010	Succeeded by George Lombard
