= Luis Aguayo =

Puerto Rican baseball player and coach (born 1959)

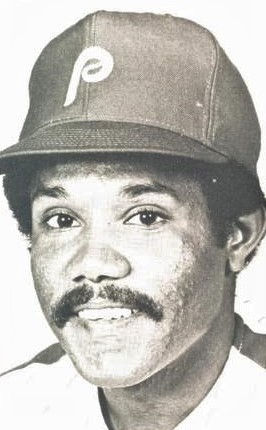
- Infielder
- Born: March 13, 1959 (age 67); Vega Baja, Puerto Rico
- Batted: Right Threw: Right

MLB debut
- April 19, 1980, for the Philadelphia Phillies

Last MLB appearance
- September 30, 1989, for the Cleveland Indians

MLB statistics
- Batting average: .236
- Home runs: 37
- Runs batted in: 109
- Stats at Baseball Reference

Teams
- Philadelphia Phillies (1980–1988); New York Yankees (1988); Cleveland Indians (1989)

Luis Aguayo Muriel (born March 13, 1959) is a Puerto Rican former professional baseball infielder and coach, who played in Major League Baseball (MLB) for the Philadelphia Phillies, New York Yankees, and Cleveland Indians.

== Professional career ==
Aguayo was signed by the Philadelphia Phillies as an amateur free agent on December 27, 1975, at the age of 16. He made his big league debut for the Phillies on April 19, 1980, in a win over the Expos. He entered the game in the top of 3rd inning as a pinch runner for Manny Trillo, and would play second base for the remainder of the game. Although Aguayo would play with the Phillies until 1988, he only appeared in two games in the 1981 postseason, acting as a pinch runner in the series against the Dodgers. According to some metrics, Aguayo ranked 76th in the National League according to statistics in 1985.

Aguayo was traded to the New York Yankees in the middle of July 1988 for minor leaguer Amalio Carreño, and would sign with the Cleveland Indians after the season. Aguayo only appeared in 47 games for the Indians before being released after the 1989 season, and would linger in the minor leagues until 1992, batting .255 in 80 games for the Pawtucket Red Sox.

== Post-playing career ==
After his playing career was over, Aguayo managed the Red Sox Class A Lowell Spinners from 1999 to 2000.

On June 17, 2008, Aguayo was named the New York Mets third base coach. On October 23 of that season, the Mets announced that Aguayo would be reassigned within the organization and that Razor Shines would be replacing him as third base coach. Aguayo is currently the international field coordinator/infield instructor for the minor league staff of the St. Louis Cardinals.

== See also ==
- List of Major League Baseball players from Puerto Rico

Sporting positions
Preceded by Bob Geren	Gulf Coast League Red Sox manager 1997–1998	Succeeded by John Sanders
Preceded by Dick Berardino	Lowell Spinners manager 1999–2000	Succeeded by Arnie Beyeler
Preceded by Sandy Alomar Sr.	New York Mets Third base coach 2008	Succeeded by Razor Shines
