= John Sanders (baseball) =

American baseball player (1945–2022)

- Pinch runner
- Born: November 20, 1945; Grand Island, Nebraska, U.S.
- Died: February 3, 2022 (aged 76); Woodstock, Georgia, U.S.
- Batted: Right Threw: Right

MLB debut
- April 13, 1965, for the Kansas City Athletics

Last MLB appearance
- April 13, 1965, for the Kansas City Athletics

MLB statistics
- Games played: 1
- Runs scored: 0
- Stats at Baseball Reference

Teams
- Kansas City Athletics (1965)

John Frank Sanders (November 20, 1945 – February 3, 2022) was an American professional baseball scout, Major League Baseball player for the Kansas City Athletics, a manager at the pro level, and a college baseball coach. He was the longtime (1978–1997) head baseball coach of the University of Nebraska–Lincoln, where his teams won a school-record 767 games.

== Biography ==
Born in Grand Island, Nebraska, Sanders was a four-sport (baseball, basketball, football and track) star at Grand Island High School before he was signed to his first professional contract as an outfielder by Athletics scout Whitey Herzog. Sanders threw and batted right-handed, stood 6 feet 2 inches (1.88 m) tall and weighed 200 pounds (91 kg).

In his rookie season (1964) in the Appalachian League, Sanders batted only 30 times, but collected 13 hits for a .433 batting average. He was then kept on Kansas City's Major League roster at the outset of the 1965 season under the terms of the bonus rules then in force. During that time, he appeared in his only Major League game, on April 13, 1965, as a pinch runner in an 11–4 loss to the Detroit Tigers. On May 4, 1965, the A's lost Sanders on waivers to the Boston Red Sox when they attempted to send him to the minor leagues for more seasoning. He played in the Red Sox, New York Mets and Kansas City Royals farm systems through 1968 before quitting the pro game. Overall, he batted .269 with ten home runs in 205 minor league games.

Sanders held both bachelor's and master's degrees from the University of Northern Colorado. He first embarked on a coaching career in 1974 at a community college. After compiling a 34–15 mark at Arizona Western College in 1975–1976, he joined the Nebraska Cornhuskers as an assistant coach in 1977, and in 1978 was elevated to head coach by legendary Nebraska athletic director Bob Devaney. During Sanders' 20-year-long tenure, Nebraska had nine 40-victory seasons, made the NCAA Division I baseball tournament three times, and produced 92 professional players, including 1995 Major League Baseball first-round draft choice Darin Erstad and long time Texas Rangers first baseman Pete O'Brien.

In 1999, Sanders returned to professional baseball and the Red Sox organization, spending nine seasons with Boston as manager of their Rookie-level Gulf Coast Red Sox affiliate (1999–2002) and a scout based in Woodstock, Georgia (2003–2007). He then became a professional scout for the Los Angeles Dodgers, where he played an instrumental role in the August 25, 2012, trade that brought Josh Beckett, Adrián González and Carl Crawford from Boston to the Dodgers.

Sanders was named to the Nebraska Sports Hall of Fame in 2002. He died from cancer on February 3, 2022, at the age of 76.

Sporting positions
Preceded by Luis Aguayo	Gulf Coast League Red Sox manager 1999–2002	Succeeded by Ralph Treuel
