= Ralph Treuel =

- Coach
- Born: June 7, 1955 (age 71); Elyria, Ohio, U.S.
- Bats: Right Throws: Right
- Stats at Baseball Reference

Teams
- Detroit Tigers (1995); Boston Red Sox (2001; 2006)

Ralph Martin Treuel (/ˈtrɔɪɛl/ TROY-el; born June 7, 1955) is an American professional baseball coach and a former Minor League Baseball pitcher. He spent all or parts of three seasons in Major League Baseball (MLB) on the coaching staff of the Detroit Tigers and Boston Red Sox. Treuel has worked for the Red Sox organization in various coaching and advisory roles since 1996.

== Playing career ==
Treuel has spent his entire 52-year professional baseball career with the Tigers and Red Sox. After attending Lorain County Community College, he signed with Detroit in 1974 and pitched for nine seasons in the Tiger farm system, including service with the Triple-A Evansville Triplets during 1978–1980. He compiled a 53–43 won–loss mark with a 4.11 earned run average (ERA) in 193 minor-league games. He also pitched for the Leones del Caracas champion team of the Venezuelan Winter League during the 1979–80 season, and made a start in the 1980 Caribbean Series.

== Coaching and managerial career ==
In 1983, Treuel became the pitching coach for the rookie-Level Bristol Tigers of the Appalachian League. In later assignments, he served as Detroit's roving minor-league pitching instructor (1985–1990), pitching coach of the Triple-A Toledo Mud Hens (1991–1992) and field coordinator of player development (1993–1994). In 1995, Treuel was Sparky Anderson's pitching coach with the major-league Tigers, but left the Detroit organization following that campaign.

In 1996, Treuel joined the Red Sox as pitching coach of the Double-A Trenton Thunder, and was promoted to his first term as minor-league pitching coordinator in 1999. From September 2001 through spring training of 2002, he was the major-league pitching coach of the Red Sox, but he was reassigned in favor of Tony Cloninger when Grady Little replaced Joe Kerrigan as manager on the eve of the 2002 season.

During 2003–2005, Treuel served as manager of the rookie-level Gulf Coast Red Sox, then began his second term as Boston's roving minor-league pitching coordinator in 2006. However, Treuel interrupted that assignment to work as the Red Sox' major-league bullpen coach for four months of the 2006 season, when surgery sidelined pitching coach Dave Wallace until August 8.

In 2019, Treuel became one of two pitching coordinators in the Boston system as head of logistics, with former major-league pitcher Dave Bush named to a similar role in charge of pitching performance. Treuel continued that role into the 2021 season. In February 2022, Treuel was named a minor league pitching advisor for the Red Sox.

Treuel was inducted into the Elyria Sports Hall of Fame in 1990.

Sporting positions
Preceded by Billy Muffett	Detroit Tigers pitching coach 1995	Succeeded by Jon Matlack
Preceded by John Cumberland	Boston Red Sox pitching coach 2001	Succeeded by Tony Cloninger
Preceded by John Sanders	Gulf Coast League Red Sox manager 2003–2005	Succeeded by Dave Tomlin
Preceded by Al Nipper	Boston Red Sox bullpen coach 2006 (April 3–August 8)	Succeeded by Al Nipper
