= Darren Fenster =

American baseball player and manager

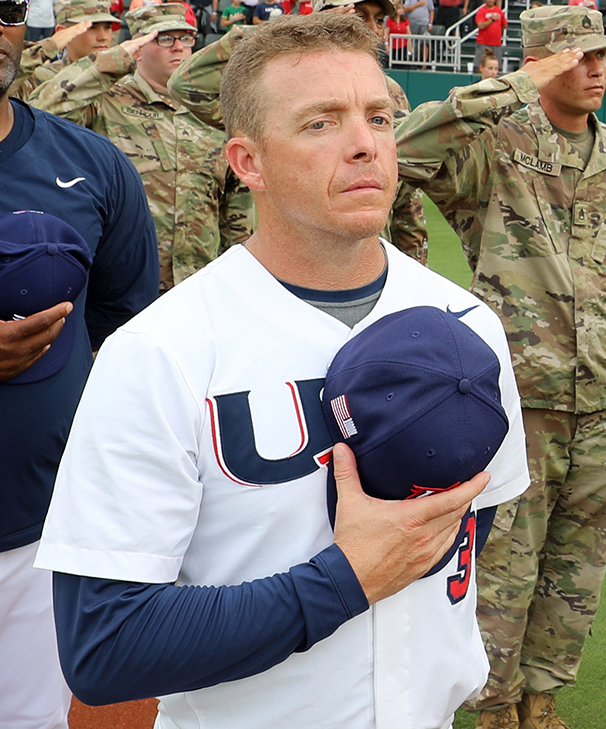
- Fenster with the United States national baseball team in 2021

Boston Red Sox
- Infielder / Manager
- Born: September 11, 1978 (age 46); Edison, New Jersey, U.S.
- Bats: Right Throws: Right

Darren Fenster (born September 11, 1978) is an American former professional baseball player and manager who works in the Minor League Baseball system of the Boston Red Sox. As a player, he was listed at 5 feet 9 inches (1.75 m) and 175 pounds (79 kg) while batting and throwing right-handed.

== Playing career ==
Fenster grew up in Middletown Township, New Jersey, and graduated from Middletown High School South in 1996; he went on to play collegiate baseball with the Rutgers Scarlet Knights baseball team. In 1998, he played collegiate summer baseball with the Cotuit Kettleers of the Cape Cod Baseball League (CCBL).

Selected in the 12th round by the Kansas City Royals in the 2000 Major League Baseball draft, Fenster played in Minor League Baseball for the Spokane Indians (Class A Short Season), Burlington Bees (Class A), Wilmington Blue Rocks (Class A-Advanced) and the Wichita Wranglers (Double-A). After five seasons in the Royals' farm system, a knee injury led to the end of his playing career. In 438 minor-league games, he compiled a .267 batting average with five home runs and 179 runs batted in. Defensively, he appeared primarily as a second baseman and third baseman, while also playing some games as a shortstop and outfielder.

== Coaching career ==
In 2006, Rutgers manager Fred Hill asked Fenster to serve as a coach for the Scarlet Knights. In 2008, Fenster returned to the CCBL an assistant coach for the Orleans Cardinals.

Fenster was a manager in the Boston Red Sox organization for six seasons. His first minor league managing post was in 2013 with the Gulf Coast League Red Sox. He then spent the next four seasons managing the Greenville Drive of the Class A South Atlantic League, winning the team's first league championship in 2017. In 2018, he managed the Portland Sea Dogs of the Double-A Eastern League. Fenster became the Red Sox' minor league outfield and baserunning coordinator before the 2019 season. In February 2022, Fenster was named minor league infield coordinator for the Red Sox.

=== Managerial record ===
| Year | Team (Class) | W | L | Pct. | Notes |
|---|---|---|---|---|---|
| 2013 | GCL Red Sox (Rk) | 35 | 25 | .583 | lost in league finals |
| 2014 | Greenville Drive (A) | 60 | 79 | .432 | missed playoffs |
| 2015 | Greenville Drive (A) | 72 | 68 | .514 | missed playoffs |
| 2016 | Greenville Drive (A) | 70 | 69 | .504 | missed playoffs |
| 2017 | Greenville Drive (A) | 79 | 60 | .568 | league champions |
| 2018 | Portland Sea Dogs (AA) | 63 | 76 | .453 | missed playoffs |
| Total | | 379 | 377 | .501 | |

=== Team USA ===
In April 2021, Fenster was named as a coach for the United States national baseball team, for the team's final efforts to qualify for baseball at the 2020 Summer Olympics. After the team qualified, Fenster was named the team's third-base coach for the Olympics. The team went on to win silver, falling to Japan in the gold-medal game.

Sporting positions
| Preceded by George Lombard | Gulf Coast League Red Sox manager 2013 | Succeeded by Tom Kotchman |
