= City of Palms Park =

Baseball stadium in Fort Myers, Florida

Coordinates: 26°38′4″N 81°52′2″W

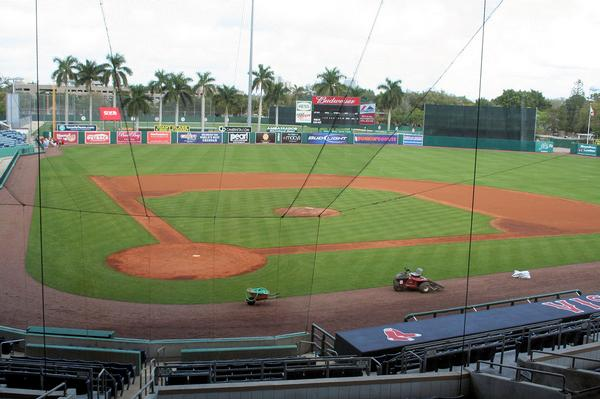
- Interactive map of City of Palms Park
- Location: 2201 Edison Ave; Fort Myers, Florida 33901
- Owner: Lee County Sports Authority
- Capacity: 8,000 (2008)
- Surface: Grass
- Field size: Left Field: 330 ft Center Field: 410 ft Right Field: 330 ft

Construction
- Groundbreaking: 1992
- Opened: 1993
- Closed: 2026
- Architect: Populous
- Structural engineers: Bliss & Nyitray, Inc

Tenants
- Spring training Boston Red Sox (AL) (1993–2011) Minor League Baseball; GCL Red Sox (GCL) (1993–2011) College baseball Florida SouthWestern State College (2014–2025)

City of Palms Park was a baseball stadium in Fort Myers, Florida, which served as the spring training home of the Boston Red Sox of Major League Baseball (MLB) from its opening in 1993 to 2011. It hosted college baseball games for Florida SouthWestern State College 2014 to its closure. The stadium's name is taken from the city's official nickname.

== History ==
City of Palms Park was built in 1992 to be the spring training home of the Boston Red Sox. It has a seating capacity of 8,000 people. It was also the home of the Red Sox' Rookie-level team in Minor League Baseball, the Gulf Coast League Red Sox, who played a season lasting from June through August each year.

=== Player Development Complex ===
The Player Development Complex was where the Red Sox trained and practiced before the exhibition season began at City of Palms. It also housed all the Minor League Baseball affiliates and coaches the entire month of March, and it was where players were reassigned as they trimmed the roster down during spring training. Once spring training ended, extended spring training ran from April through the beginning of the Gulf Coast League season. Instructional league took place there from September to October.

The complex included five baseball fields with bullpens and eight batting tunnels. The clubhouse included a meeting room, conference room, kitchen, six offices, a players locker room with showers, a trainer/therapy room, a hydrotherapy room, laundry room, an umpire locker room, coaches locker room, and an expanded weight training room that was added in 2004–05.

=== Red Sox departure ===
The Red Sox had a lease with Fort Myers for City of Palms Park through 2019, however, team ownership had been considering exercising an early exit in their contract, allowing them to leave following 2009 spring training. On October 28, 2008, the Lee County commission voted 3–1 to approve an agreement with the Boston Red Sox to build a new spring training facility for the team in south Lee County. That new facility became known as "JetBlue Park", and in February 2012, the Boston Red Sox moved their spring training operations into the newly constructed JetBlue Park located on County Road 876 (Daniels Parkway) in Fort Myers.

=== Post-Red Sox usage ===
Lee County had owned the stadium since 2003, when the City of Fort Myers transferred ownership due to the cost of upkeep. Since 2014, the stadium had been used by the baseball team of Florida SouthWestern State College, and it was also used for some amateur baseball games. The City of Fort Myers occasionally used the venue for concerts.

Two active spring training ballparks remain in Fort Myers, with the previously mentioned JetBlue Park, spring training home of the Red Sox, and Hammond Stadium, spring training home of the Minnesota Twins

=== Demolition ===
Maintaining the ballpark cost the city $500,000 each year, yet the facility only created $32,000 in revenue annually. In the fall of 2019, Lee County officials received a request from the City of Fort Myers to demolish the stadium, so the land could be given back to the city for use in a redevelopment project. On April 20, 2026, the city awarded a $998,000 demolition contract to Honc Destruction, a local company owned by Lee County Commissioner David Mulicka which provided the lowest of nine bids. Work is expected to be completed in November 2026. Before demolition began, historical artifacts that were stored at the facility were removed and preserved after pressure from the community when artifacts had previously been discovered in a dumpster.

In July 2026, demolition of the stadium began when large portions of the structure were razed, while grass was gradually re-sodded in order to make the site more attractive to future development. Demolition is expected to wrap up in November 2026.
