= JetBlue Park =

Baseball park located in Fort Myers, Florida

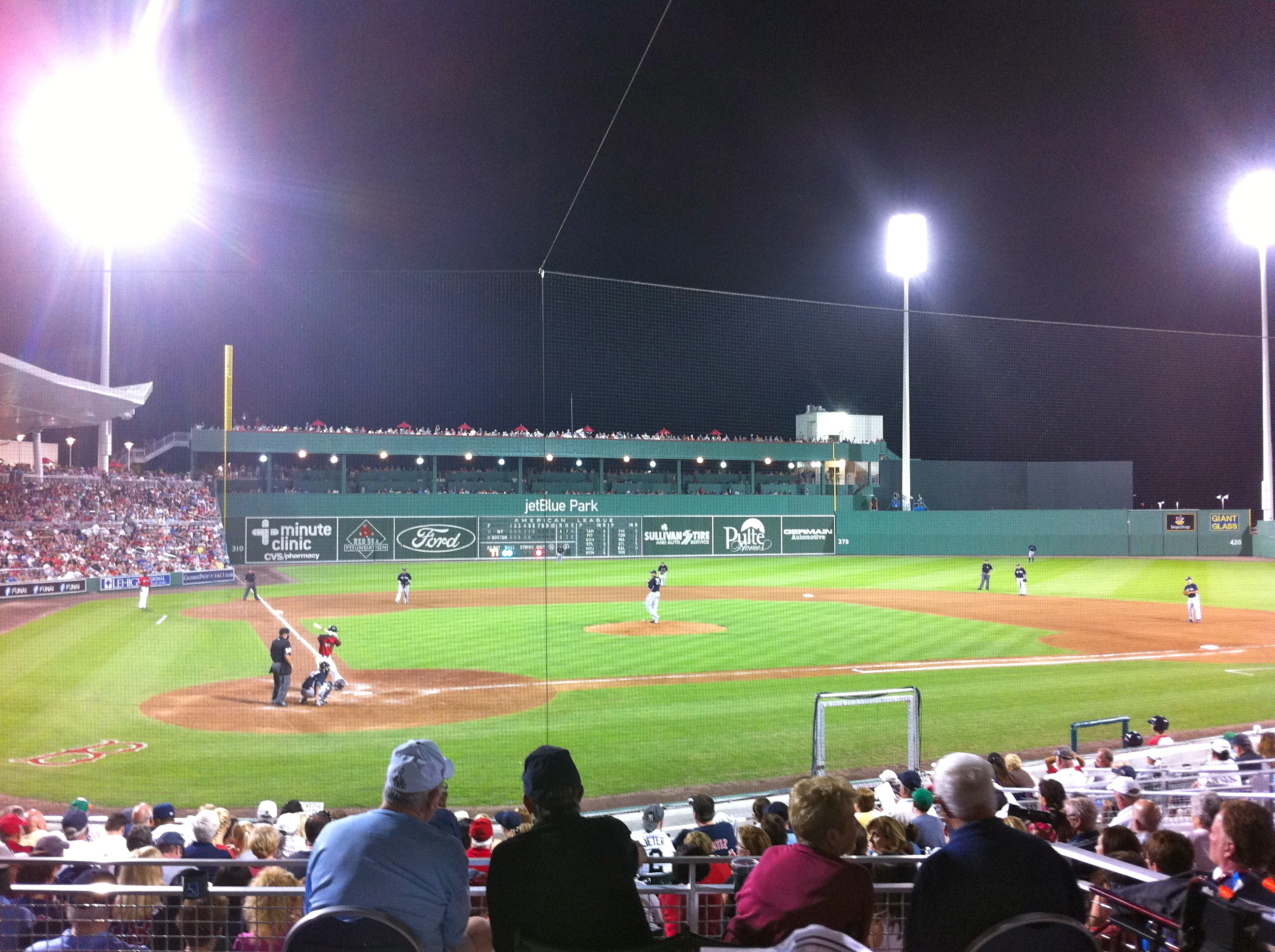
- Interactive map of JetBlue Park
- Full name: JetBlue Park at Fenway South
- Location: 11500 Fenway South Drive; Fort Myers, Florida
- Coordinates: 26°32′53″N 81°45′48″W
- Capacity: 10,823
- Surface: Bermuda Grass (Celebration)
- Field size: Same as Fenway Park: Left Field: 310 feet Left-Center Field: 379 feet Center Field: 420 feet Right Field Bullpen: 380 feet Right Field Pole: 302 feet

Construction
- Groundbreaking: March 4, 2011
- Opened: March 3, 2012
- Cost: US$77.9 Million
- Architect: Populous
- Structural engineers: Bliss & Nyitray, Inc.
- General contractor: Manhattan Kraft Construction

Tenants
- Boston Red Sox (MLB) (spring training) 2012–present FCL Red Sox (FCL) 2012–present

JetBlue Park at Fenway South is a baseball park in Fort Myers, Florida, United States. Opened in March 2012, it is primarily the spring training home of the Boston Red Sox, replacing earlier separated facilities at City of Palms Park and Boston's former (1993–2011) minor league complex, also located in downtown Fort Myers. The naming rights were purchased by JetBlue, an airline with major operations at Boston's Logan International Airport since 2004.

== History ==
In 2008, the Red Sox began exploring the possibility of relocating their spring training facility. Their previous spring training facility, City of Palms Park, was lacking the modern amenities that other spring training ball parks had and was located two and half miles away from the team's minor league complex. Red Sox CEO Mike Dee visited Sarasota to talk with city officials about the possibility of the team moving there. Sarasota County commissioners then voted 4-0 to approve the purchase of land for a Red Sox spring training facility. Fearing the possibility of losing the Red Sox the Lee County Commission voted in October 2008 to agree to build a new ballpark for the Red Sox. The Red Sox also signed a 30-year lease with the city of Fort Myers. The following April it was announced that the new stadium would be located on a 126-acre (51 ha) lot north of Southwest Florida International Airport. When the Red Sox announced they would stay in Fort Myers they stated the new stadium would be similar to Fenway Park. The architecture team was led by local Fort Myers firm Parker/Mudgett/Smith Architects, Inc. and Populous and assisted by Boston firm Quirk. The groundbreaking was in August 2010 and construction commenced in February 2011.

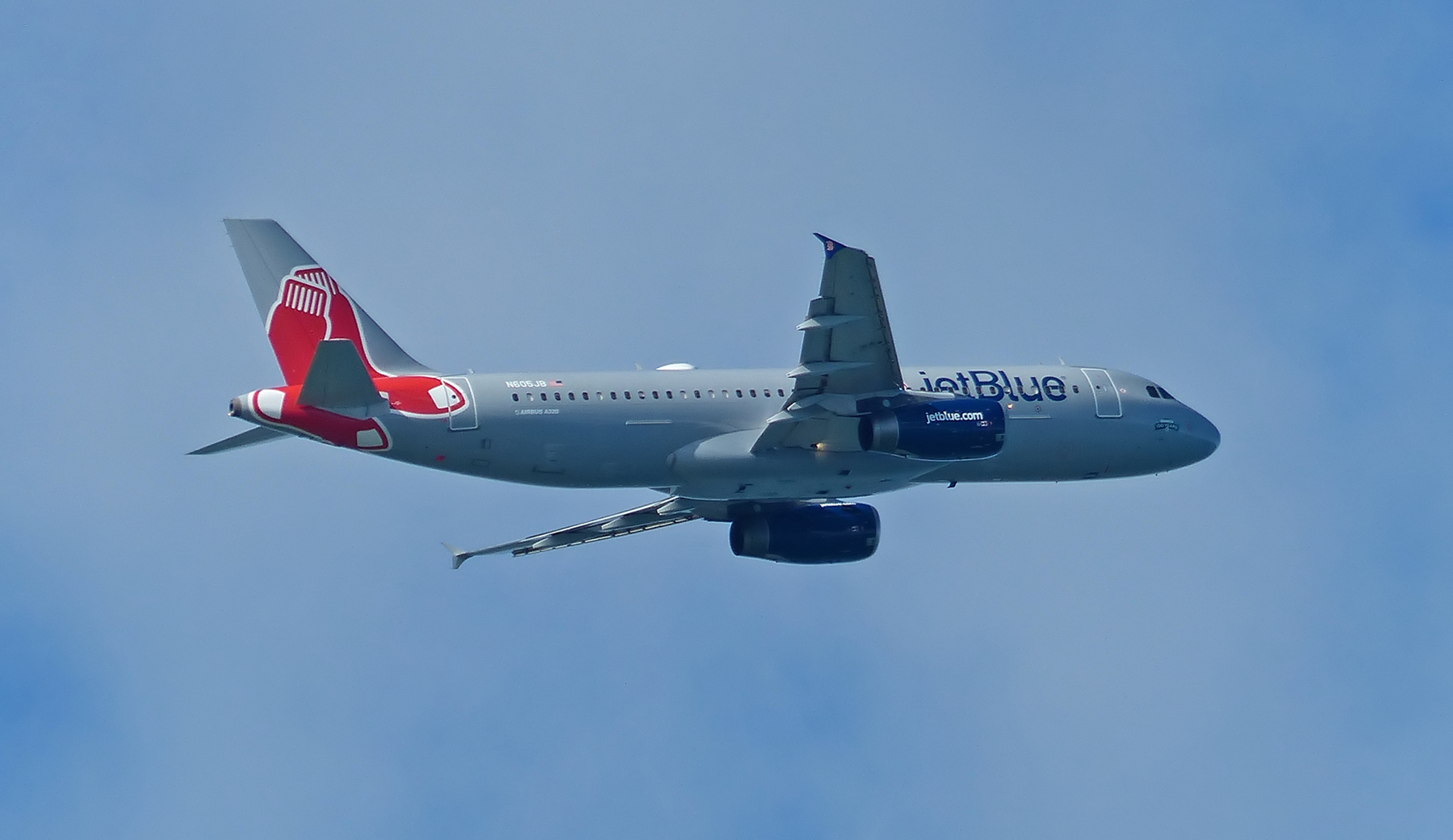
A JetBlue Airbus A320, registration N605JB, was painted in Red Sox colors in 2012, the 100th anniversary of Fenway Park.

== Design ==
The ballpark's field has exactly the same dimensions as Fenway Park and some of the unique features as the Boston ballpark as well. The most notable is a replica of the Green Monster in left field. However, unlike the one in Boston, the Green Monster in Fort Myers has seating within the wall. There are three rows of seats in the middle portion of the wall, referred to as "mid-Monster" seating. These seats are protected by a net so that baseballs cannot reach the seated area, and any ball hit off the net is considered to still be in play. Placing seats inside the wall was necessitated by local wind mitigation codes, as a continuous span the height of Boston's Green Monster, which is 37 feet 2 inches (11.33 m) tall, would not have been compliant. As constructed, the left-field wall at JetBlue Park is 23 feet (7.0 m) to the mid-Monster seating, while seating on top of the non-continuous wall is at 42 feet 11 inches (13.08 m).

Another distinctive feature of the Green Monster is that, like the original one in Fenway Park, it has a manual scoreboard. The scoreboard is the same, 1934-vintage unit that had been used for decades in Fenway Park, but before being installed in Fort Myers was in a storage facility in South Dakota. The manual scoreboard is different from the one in Boston though because there is no room behind it where a scoreboard operator can put numbers while the game is going on. Instead, a scoreboard operator works in a room in between the scoreboard and the foul line and has to run out in between innings with a ladder and scoreboard tiles to change the scoreboard.

Other features from the ballpark in Boston which are present in the spring training stadium are the triangle, Pesky's Pole, and Lone Red Seat marking the longest home run ever hit in Fenway's history.

One of the signature features of the ballpark is the wavy roof sitting over the seats in the stadium, providing shade for the fans in attendance. The roof also is an example of how the ballpark incorporated its location in Florida into the design of the stadium. The wavy design of the roof resembles the Cypress trees in the surrounding area of the ballpark. In addition, the blocks which make up the ballpark are embedded with sea shells from nearby Sanibel Island. The park also features a lawn in right field, a popular feature in spring training parks.

The ballpark's design is also LEED Certified.

== Features ==
In addition to the ballpark where spring training games are played there is also a state of the art player development complex. Unlike the old spring training ball park, JetBlue Park is located on the same piece of land as the player development complex. The player development complex features six fields that can be used for drills during spring training, injury rehab assignments and many other baseball activities. One of the six practice fields has the same dimensions as Fenway Park. There are two locker rooms, one for the major league players and another one for the minor leaguers. The major league locker room used during spring training has an oval shaped design, is 50,000 square feet (4,600 m^{2}), and has lounge areas with flat screen televisions.

== Opening ==
The first game played in JetBlue park was on March 3, 2012, against Northeastern University. However, the first Grapefruit League game played at the park (the third game overall) was played on March 4, 2012, against the crosstown rival Minnesota Twins. On March 4 the ceremonial first pitch saw eight current players catching, with the balls brought onto the field by Carl Yastrzemski, Jim Rice, Luis Tiant, and Dwight Evans. The first homer at the field was hit in the opening game by Lars Anderson and was a grand slam. The home team won, 8–3.

== Tenants ==
In addition to serving as the home field for Red Sox spring training games JetBlue Park is the home field for the FCL Red Sox, who play in the Rookie-level Florida Complex League (FCL) during the summer. The park is also one of the host venues for the annual Roy Hobbs World Series and serves as a venue for local festivals, circuses, conferences, and many other events. In May 2013, JetBlue Park was the host site for the final round games of the Florida High School Athletic Association's statewide high school baseball championship tournament.

== Gallery ==
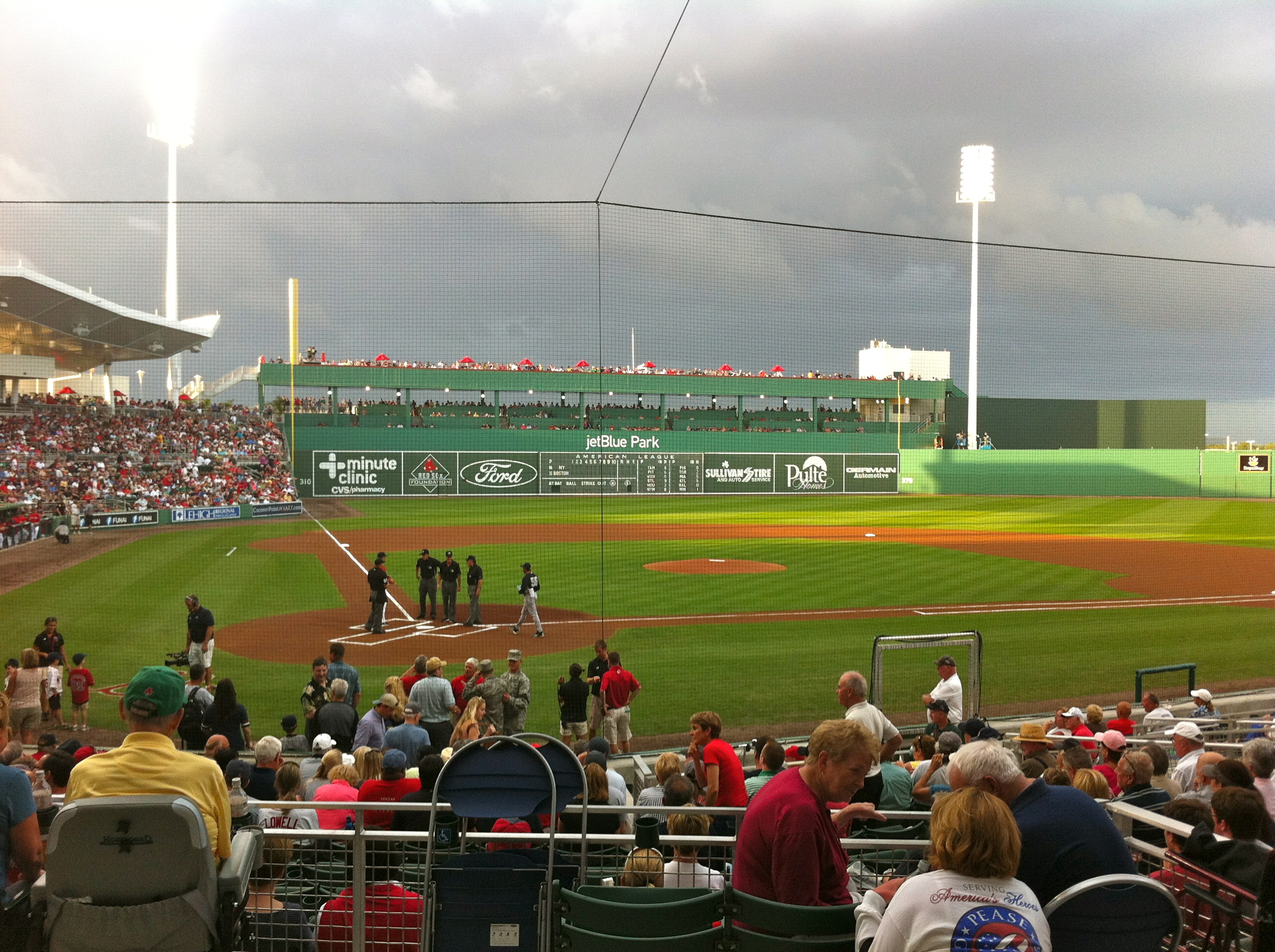
JetBlue Park at Fenway South before a Yankees Red Sox game

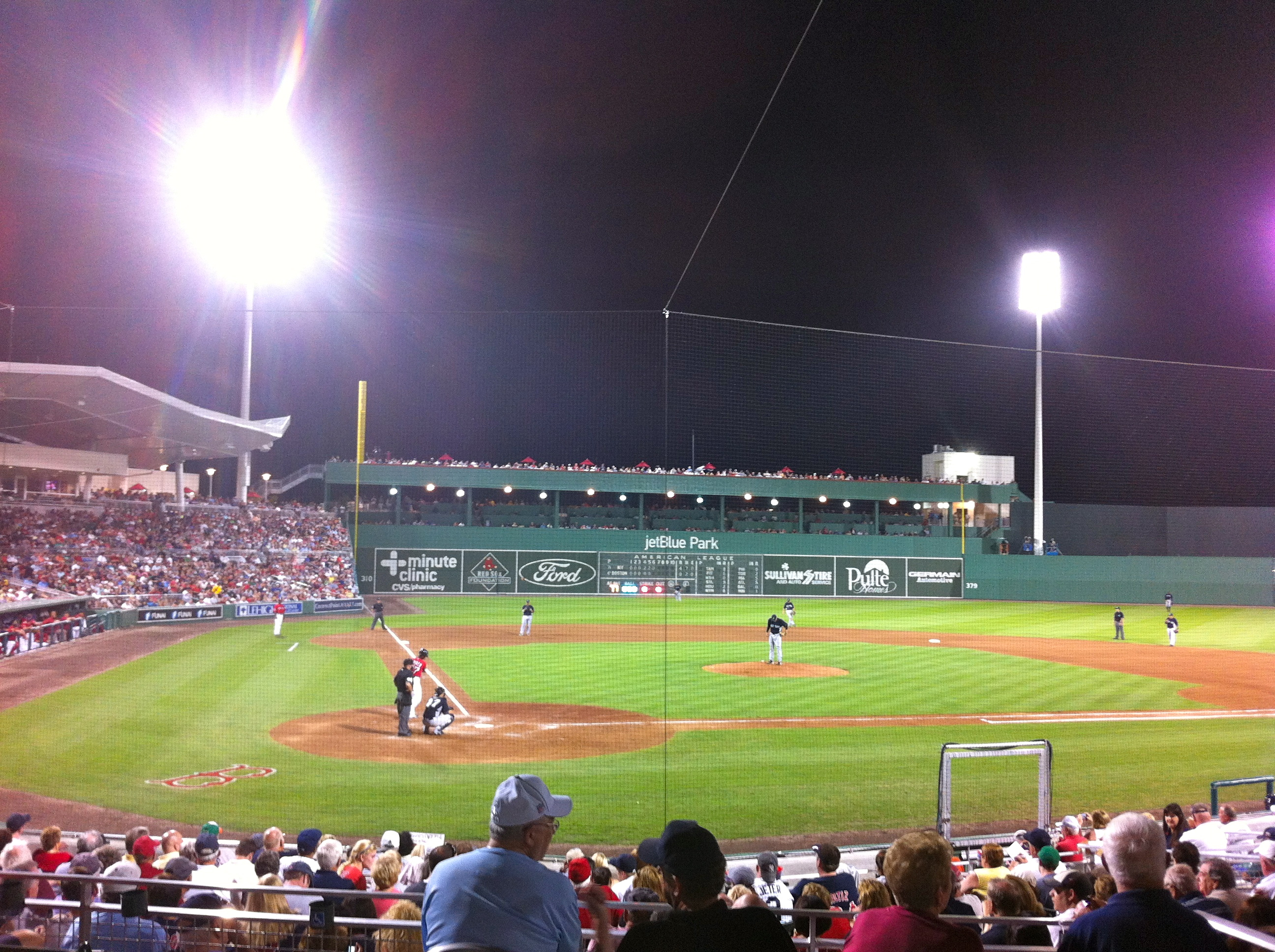
The Red Sox play a spring training game against the Yankees at night

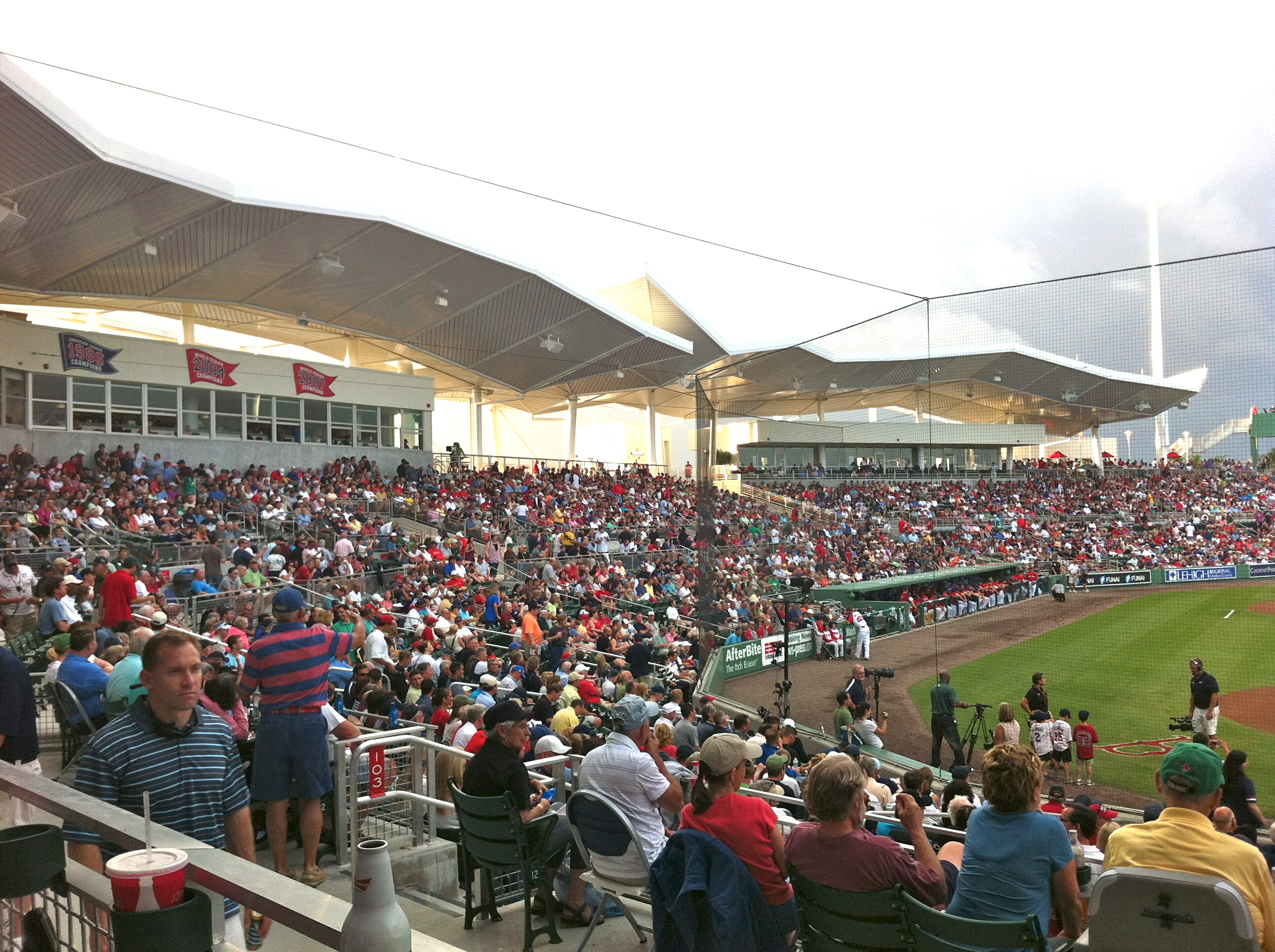
The design of the wavy roof is made to resemble the Cypress trees in the area

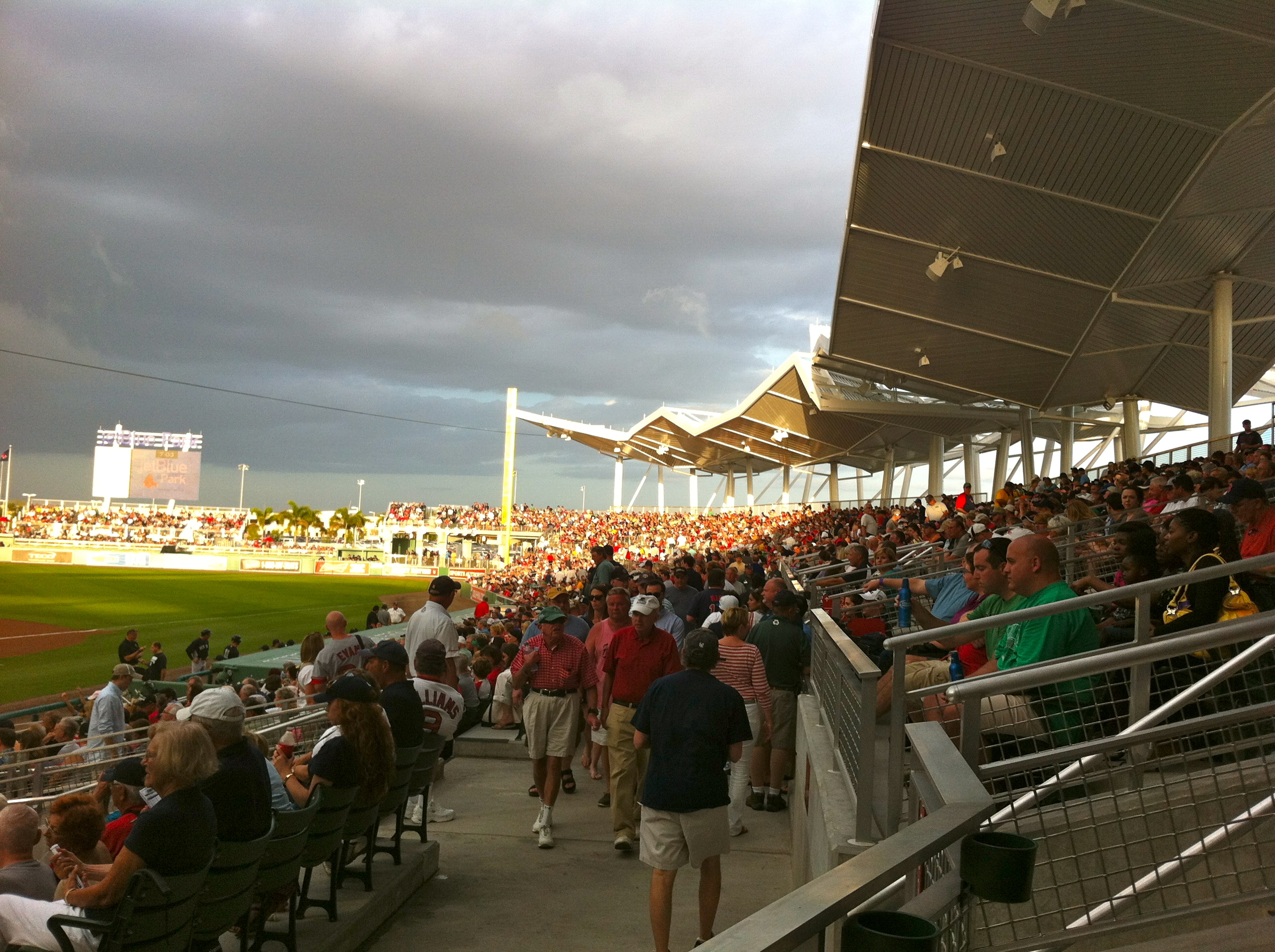
Another shot of the wavy roof and Pesky's Pole off in the distance

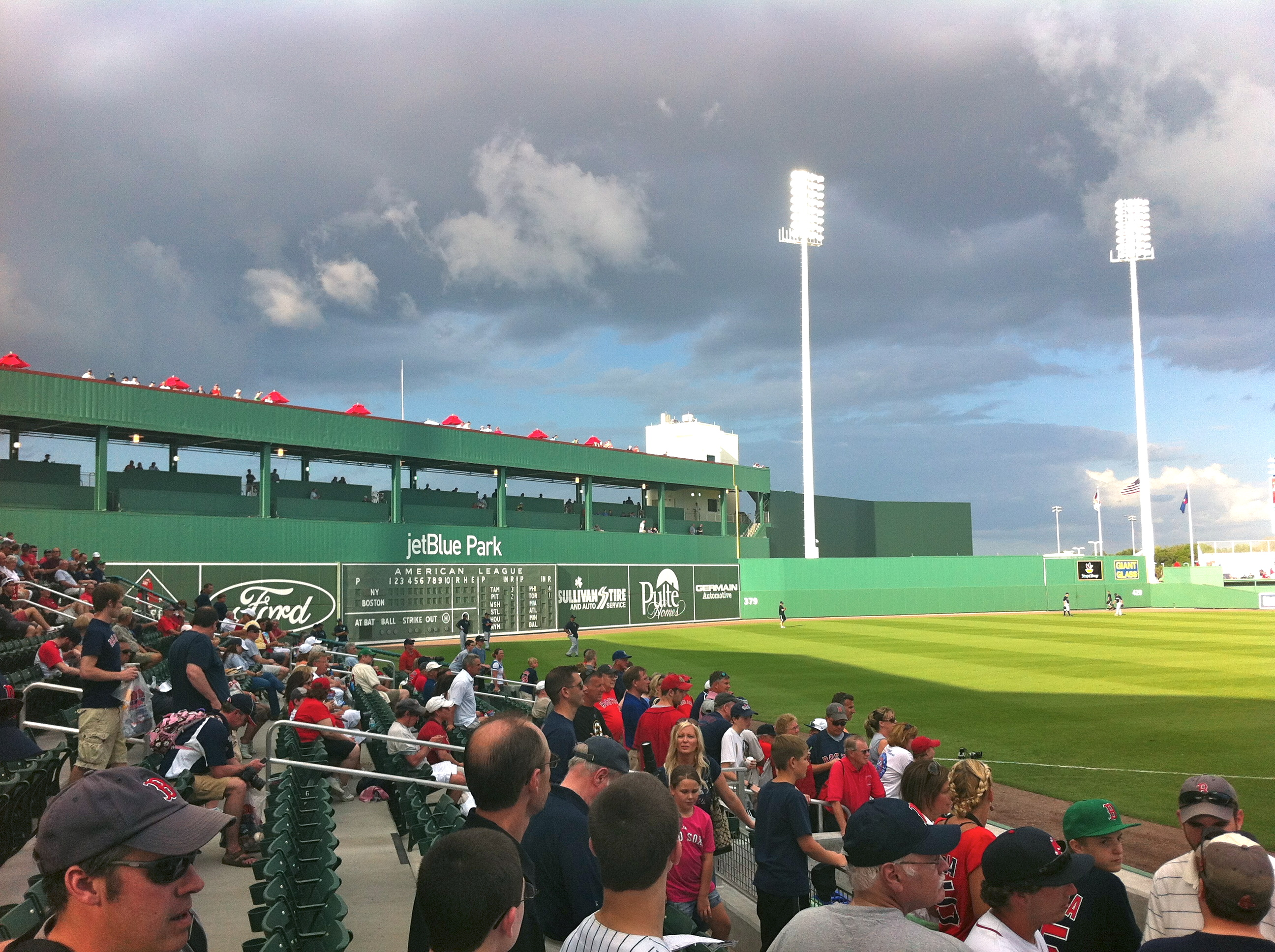
The Green Monster with seating within the wall and the triangle off to the right

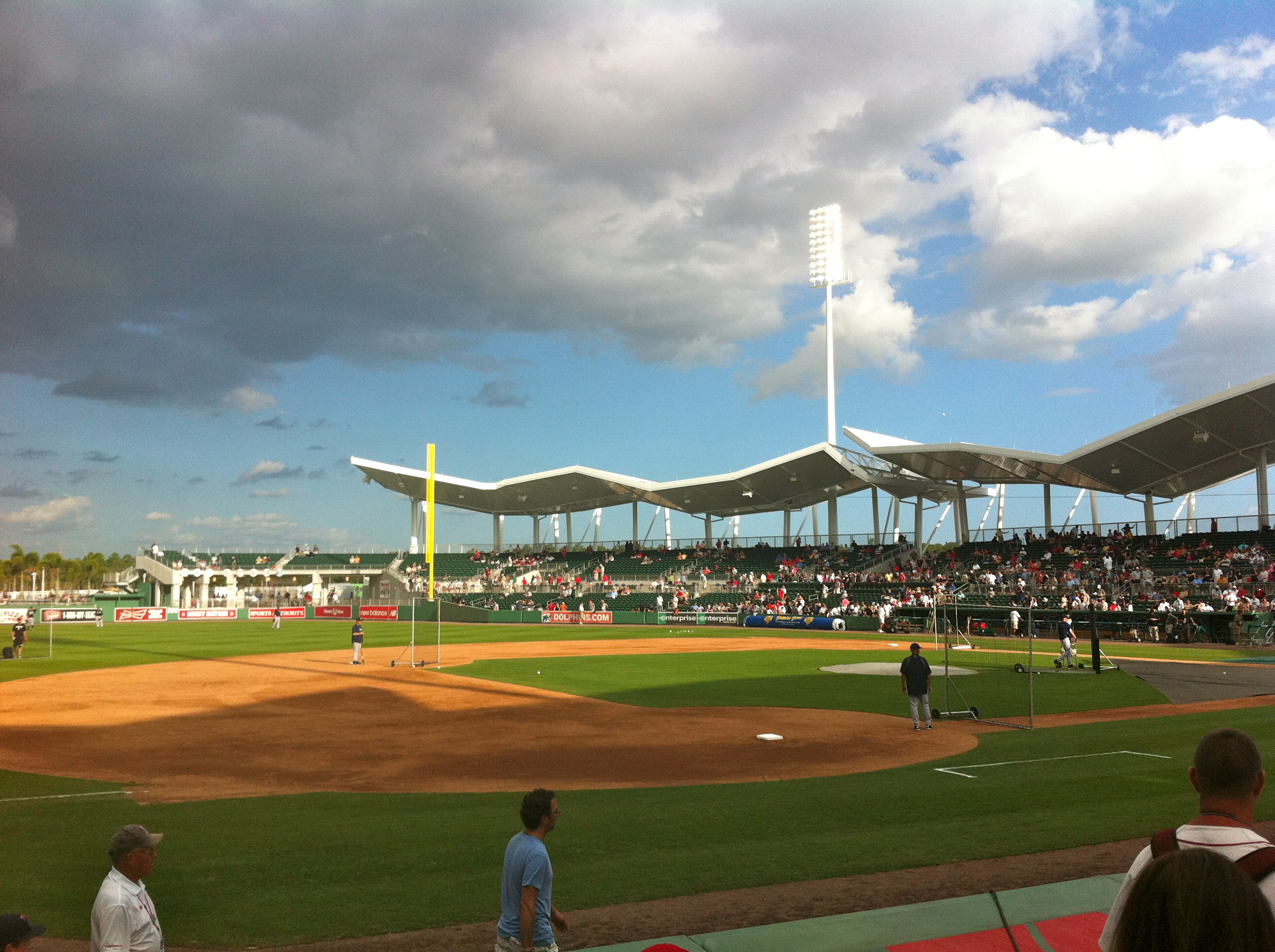
The Yankees take batting practice before a game

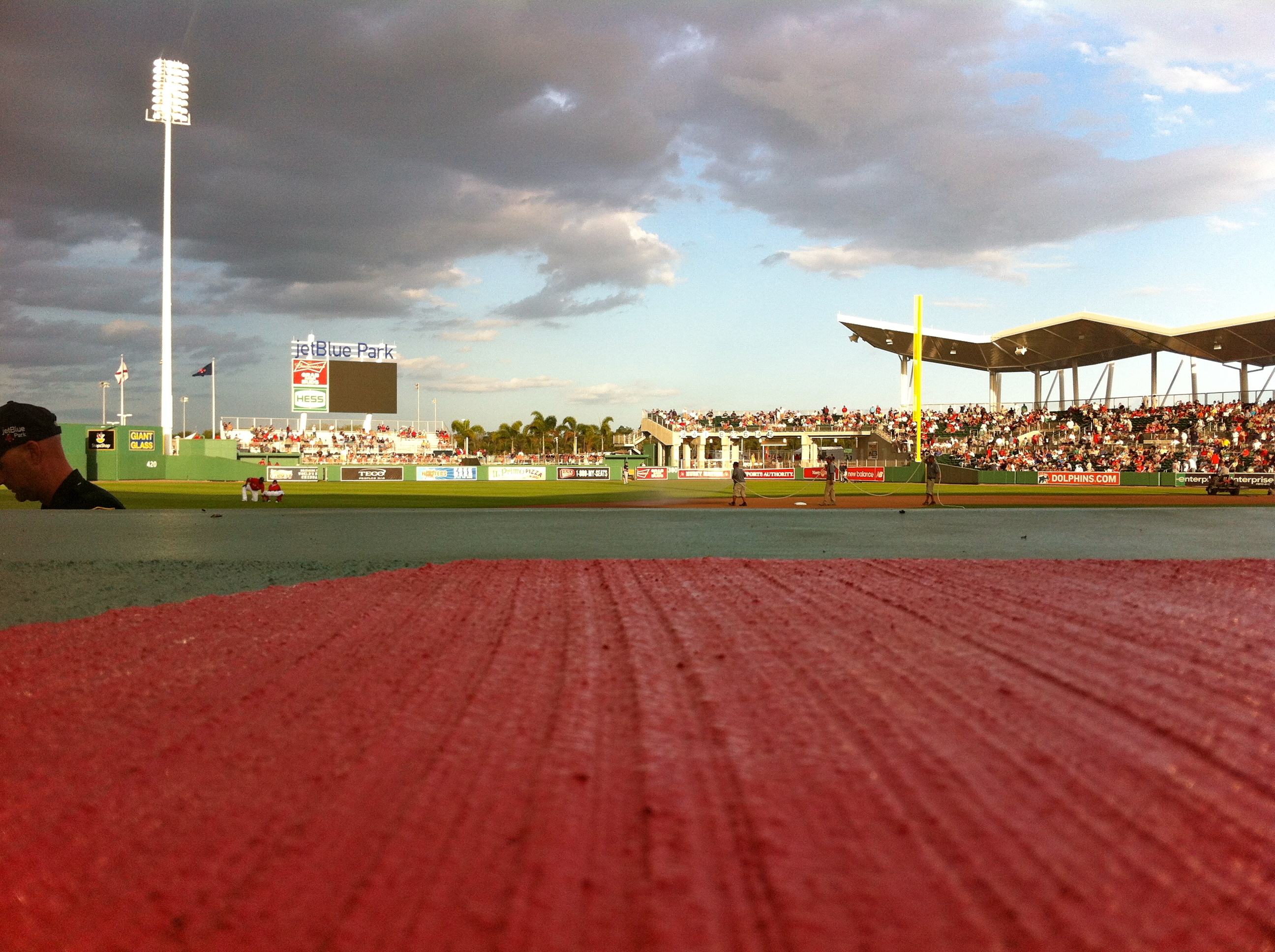
A shot from above the roof of the Red Sox dugout

== See also ==
- List of Boston Red Sox spring training venues
