= List of baseball parks in Tampa Bay, Florida =

This is a list of venues used for professional baseball in the region of Florida called Tampa Bay. It includes Tampa, St. Petersburg, Clearwater and neighboring cities. The information shown is a summary of the information contained in the references listed.

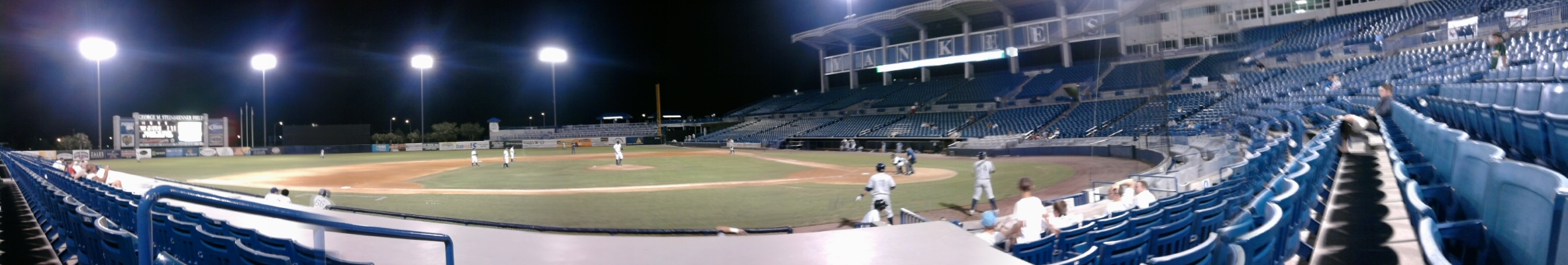
George M. Steinbrenner Field, Tampa

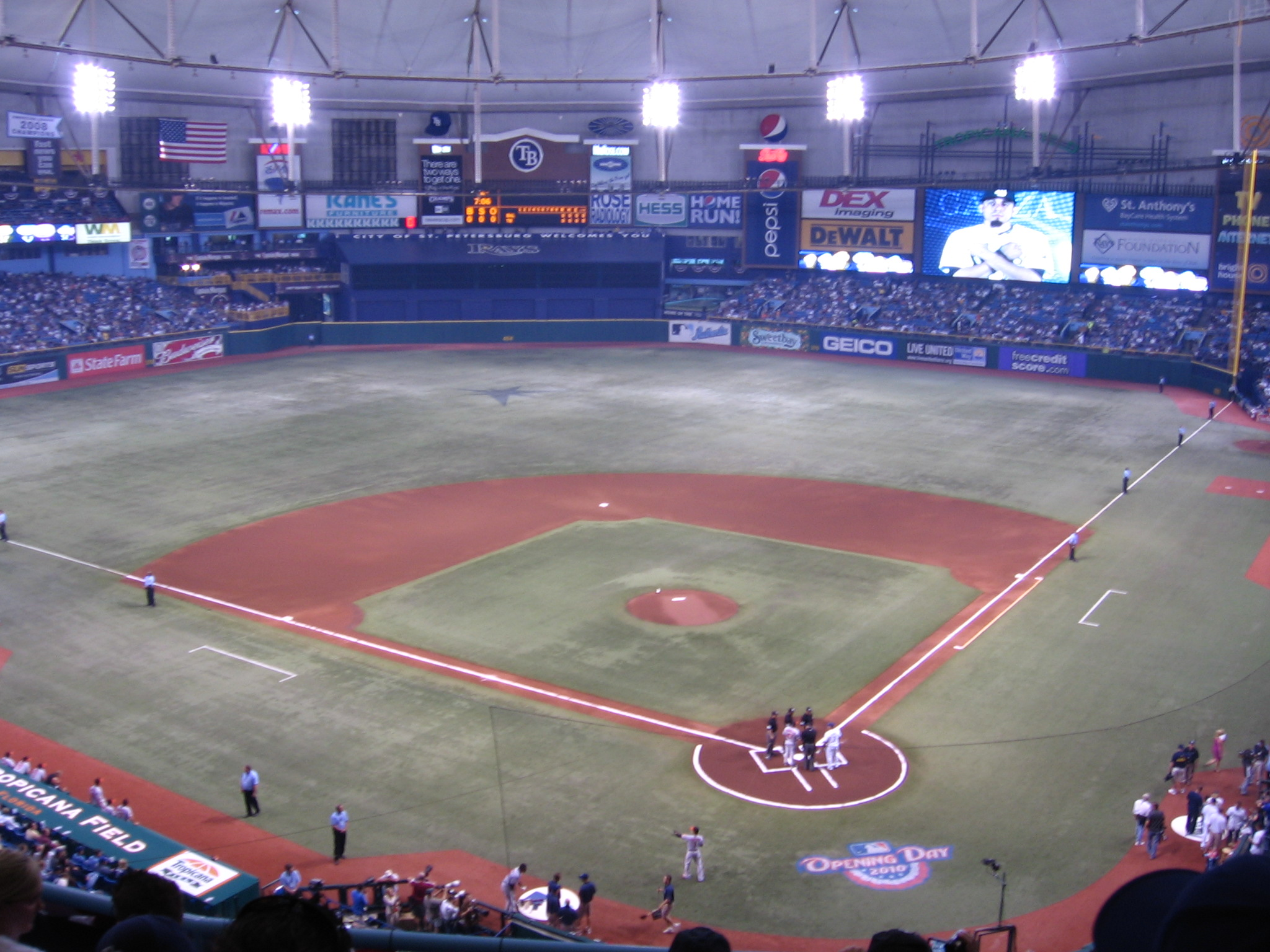
Tropicana Field, St. Pete

(name unknown)
Home of: Tampa, Florida State League (1892 only)

Plant Field (opened 1899) known as Pepin-Rood Stadium in final years (1971–2002)
Home of – spring training:

Chicago Cubs – National League (1913-16)
Boston Red Sox – American League (1919)
Washington Senators – AL (1920s)
Detroit Tigers – AL (1930s)
Cincinnati Reds – NL (1930-54)
Chicago White Sox – AL (1954)

Home of – minor league and university

Tampa Smokers – Florida State League (1919–1927)
Tampa Smokers – Southeastern League (1928–1930)
Tampa Smokers – West Coast League (1932)
Tampa Smokers – Florida International League (1946–1954)
University of Tampa (1933-36)

Location: Horse race track – on grounds east of North Boulevard and south of Cass Street.
Currently: University of Tampa athletic fields complex

(name unknown) (opened fall 1908)
Home of: St. Petersburg Saints (1908–1911)
Location: "Northeast side of Mirror Lake". Flooded by the expanding lake in 1911. Would have been about Third Avenue North and Sixth Street North.

Symonette Field
Home of: St. Petersburg Saints (1912–1914)
Location: "Tangerine Avenue just west of 40th Street."

Coffee Pot Park a.k.a. Sunshine Park (opened 1914)
Home of – spring training:

St. Louis Browns – AL (1914)
Philadelphia Phillies – NL (1915–1918)
Indianapolis Indians – American Association (1921)

Home of – minor league:

St. Petersburg Saints – Independent (1914–1919), FSL (1920–1928)

Location: St. Petersburg – "The head of Coffee Pot Bayou" – approximately 22nd Avenue North and First Street North (the actual bayou is northeast of that site a few blocks)
Currently: Residential housing.

Moore Field
Home of – spring training:

Indianapolis Indians AA (1921) (sources contradict)

Home of – minor league:

St. Petersburg Saints – Florida State League (1920) (sources contradict)

Location: St. Petersburg – "Fourth Street, Seventh Avenue South".

Clearwater Athletic Field orig. Brooklyn Field
Home of – spring training:

Brooklyn Robins (Dodgers) – NL (1923–1932)
Cleveland Indians – AL (1942)
Philadelphia Phillies – NL (1947–1954)

Home of – minor league (unconfirmed):

Clearwater Pelicans – FSL (1924 – partial season)

Location: Clearwater – Pennsylvania Avenue (west – third base?), Seminole Street (north – left field?), Palmetto Street (south – first base?), Greenwood Avenue (now North Martin Luther King Jr Avenue) (east – right field?) "Home plate was located on Pennsylvania Avenue, which ran south to north along the third base line, near Seminole Street. Left field ran parallel to Palmetto Street, and right field ran parallel to Greenwood Ave. The grandstand was destroyed by fire in April 1956."
Currently: North Greenwood Recreation and Aquatic Complex.

St. Petersburg Athletic Park a.k.a. Waterfront Park (opened 1923)
Home of – spring training:

Boston Braves NL (1921 or 1922–1937)
New York Yankees – AL (1925–1942,1946–1947)
St. Louis Cardinals – NL (1938–1942,1946–1947)

Home of – minor league:

St. Petersburg Saints – Florida State League (1921–1928)

Location: Same as Al Lang Field (see below)

Al Lang Stadium (opened 1947) a.k.a. Al Lang Field
Home of – spring training

New York Yankees – AL (1947–1950, 1952–1961)
St. Louis Cardinals – NL (1947–1997)
New York Giants – NL (1951)
New York Mets – NL (1962–1987)
Baltimore Orioles – AL (1991–1995)
Tampa Bay Rays – AL (1998–2008)

Canada national baseball team (2011–present)
Netherlands national baseball team (2011–present)
Nexen Heroes (spring training) Korea Baseball Organization (2011–present)

Home of – minor league and university

St. Petersburg Saints – Florida International League (1947–1954); Florida State League (1955–1965); St. Petersburg Cardinals – FSL (1965–1997)
St. Petersburg Pelicans – SPBA (1989–1990)
ACC Tournament (1997, 2002)
St. Petersburg Devil Rays – FSL (1998–2000)
C-USA Tournament (2000)

Location: St. Petersburg – Second Avenue Southeast (north – home plate), Bay Shore Drive Southeast and then Tampa Bay (east – left field corner), Fourth Avenue South (south – center field), First Street Southeast (west – right field corner).
Currently: Used for soccer.

Jack Russell Memorial Stadium (1955–2003) org. Jack Russell Field
Home of – spring training:

Philadelphia Phillies – NL (1955–2003)

Home of – minor league:

Clearwater Phillies – FSL (1985–2003)

Location: Clearwater – 800 Phillies Drive (west – third base); Palmetto Street (north – left field), North Jefferson Avenue (east – right field), Seminole Street (south – first base) – one block directly east of the site of Clearwater Athletic Field.

Al Lopez Field (opened 1955)
Home of – spring training

Chicago White Sox – AL (1955–1959)
Cincinnati Reds – NL (1960–1987)

Home of – minor league

Tampa Tarpons – FSL (1957–1988)

Location: Tampa – Northeast quadrant of what is now the Raymond James Stadium complex.

Tropicana Field (opened 1990) previously Florida Suncoast Dome and Thunderdome
Home of:

Tampa Bay Rays – American League (1998–2024) temporarily closed due to hurricane damage – reopened (2026)

Location: St. Petersburg – 1 Tropicana Drive – Stadium Drive and then Interstate 175 (south), 16th Street South and then Interstate 275 (west), Pinellas Trail and then First Avenue (north), parking lots and then 10th Street South (east). Edge of complex is about 10 block straight west of Al Lang Field.

George M. Steinbrenner Field (opened 1996)
Home of – spring training:

New York Yankees – AL (1996–present)

Home of – minor league:

Tampa Tarpons – FSL (1996–present)
Gulf Coast Yankees – Gulf Coast League (1990–present)

Home of:

Tampa Bay Rays – American League (2025) temporarily during reconstruction of Tropicana Field

Location: Tampa – 1 Steinbrenner Drive – Immediately northwest of Raymond James Stadium complex, across North Dale Mabry Highway

Bright House Field
Home of – spring training:

Philadelphia Phillies – NL (2004–present)

Home of – minor league:

Clearwater Threshers – FSL (2004–present)

Location: Clearwater – 601 Old Coachman Road – Just east of where Sharky Road T's into Old Coachman Road

== See also ==
- Lists of baseball parks
- Baseball in the Tampa Bay Area

== Sources ==
- Peter Filichia, Professional Baseball Franchises, Facts on File, 1993.
- Phil Lowry, Green Cathedrals, several editions.
- Michael Benson, Ballparks of North America, McFarland, 1989.
