= History of baseball in the Tampa Bay area =

This article summarizes the history of both amateur and professional baseball played in the Tampa Bay area.

== Spring training ==
In 1913, the Chicago Cubs and Cleveland Indians moved their respective spring training sites to Florida, marking the unofficial inception of the Grapefruit League; the Cubs set up their new facility in Tampa.

=== St. Petersburg ===
Since the St. Louis Browns moved their spring training site to St. Petersburg in 1914, the city has hosted more spring training games than any other.

Team	Year(s)	Stadium	Practice Field
St. Louis Browns	1914	Sunshine Park	N/A
Philadelphia Phillies	1915–1918	Sunshine Park	N/A
Boston Braves	1922–1937	Waterfront Park	N/A
New York Yankees	1925–1942, 1946–1947; 1947–1950*, 1952–1961	Waterfront Park; Al Lang Field	Huggins-Stengel Field
St. Louis Cardinals	1938–1942, 1946–1947; 1947–1997	Waterfront Park; Al Lang Field	Busch Field (1965–1987); Naimoli Field (1988–1997)
New York Giants	1951*	Al Lang Field	Huggins-Stengel Field
New York Mets	1962–1987	Al Lang Field	Huggins-Stengel Field (1962–1967); Naimoli Field (1968–1987)
Baltimore Orioles	1992–1995	Al Lang Field	Huggins-Stengel Field
Tampa Bay (Devil) Rays	1998–2008	Al Lang Field	Naimoli Field
Tampa Bay Rays	2023	Tropicana Field	Huggins-Stengel Field, ESPN Wide World of Sports Complex

*Note: In 1951, the New York Giants, whose spring training facilities were in Phoenix, Arizona, swapped locations with the New York Yankees at the request of Yankees' co-owner Del Webb. The teams returned to their typical training sites in 1952.

=== Tampa ===
Tampa has hosted spring training for seven teams: the Boston Red Sox, Chicago Cubs, Chicago White Sox, Cincinnati Reds, Detroit Tigers, Washington Senators, and the New York Yankees, who currently call Tampa their spring training home.

Team	Year(s)	Facility
Chicago Cubs	1913–1916	Plant Field
Boston Red Sox	1919	Plant Field
Washington Senators	1920–1929	Plant Field
Detroit Tigers	1930	Plant Field
Cincinnati Reds	1931–1942, 1946–1987	Plant Field
		Al Lopez Field (1955–1987)
Chicago White Sox	1954–1959	Al Lopez Field
New York Yankees	1996–present	George M. Steinbrenner Field

=== Clearwater ===
Team	Year(s)	Facility
Brooklyn Robins (Dodgers)	1923–1932	Brooklyn Field
Cleveland Indians	1942	Clearwater Athletic Field
Philadelphia Phillies	1947–present	Jack Russell Memorial Stadium (1955–2003)
		BayCare Ballpark (2004–present)

=== Dunedin ===
Dunedin has been the only spring training home to the Toronto Blue Jays since the franchise's inception.

Team	Year(s)	Facility
Toronto Blue Jays	1977–present	TD Ballpark

=== Tarpon Springs ===
Team	Year(s)	Facility
St. Louis Browns	1925–1927

=== Plant City ===
Team	Year(s)	Facility
Cincinnati Reds	1988–1997	Plant City Stadium

== Minor leagues ==
=== Past ===
The Tampa Bay area has a long association with minor league baseball. The first modern example was the 1919 Tampa Smokers, a charter member of the original Class D Florida State League (FSL). The expansion St. Petersburg Saints joined the FSL in 1920. After the Smokers folded in 1954, the Tampa Tarpons played in the FSL from 1957 until 1989.

Tampa, St. Petersburg, and other nearby communities also fielded teams in a variety of defunct minor leagues, including the Florida International League, the Florida State Negro League, and the short-lived Florida West Coast League.

=== Present ===
The Tampa Bay area is currently home to five teams in the Low-A Florida State League: the Tampa Tarpons, Clearwater Threshers, Dunedin Blue Jays, Bradenton Marauders, and Lakeland Flying Tigers. Several major league organizations also field squads in the rookie-level Gulf Coast League and the Florida Instructional League.

The corporate offices of Minor League Baseball have been located in St. Petersburg since 1973.

== Other professional leagues ==
The Tampa Rockets were a short-lived team in the late 1940s and early 1950s that played in the Florida State Negro League, one of the many Negro Leagues that existed at the time.

St. Petersburg was the home of the St. Petersburg Pelicans in the short-lived Senior Professional Baseball Association in 1989–1990. The league featured former major league players who were age 35 or older. The Pelicans won the only league championship.

== College baseball ==
Several notable ballplayers have come from the college and university baseball programs in the Tampa Bay Area. Players and managers have reached the Major Leagues from the University of South Florida, University of Tampa, St. Petersburg College and Eckerd College. Other schools in the area with baseball programs include Pasco-Hernando State College, Saint Leo University, and Hillsborough Community College.

The South Florida Bulls have made 14 NCAA Division I Tournament appearances, winning their region once in 2021.

The University of Tampa Spartans baseball program has won eight Division II national championships: 1992, 1993, 1998, 2006, 2007, 2013, 2015, and 2019.

== Amateur baseball ==
Organized amateur baseball in Tampa is thought to have begun in Ybor City and West Tampa, two neighborhoods founded in the late 1800s by immigrants from Cuba, Spain, and Italy. The neighborhoods were home to many social clubs, many of which sponsored highly competitive teams that inspired much local support.

Little League Baseball teams from the Tampa Bay Area area have made regular trips to the Little League World Series, finishing runners-up in the 1948, 1975, 1980 & 1981 Little League World Series tournaments. Tampa Bay area teams have won the state Little League tournament in 1967, 1969–1975, 1977, 1980–1981, 1988–1991, 1994, 2006, 2008, 2011, and 2012. In addition, local teams have won Junior League championships in 1982, 1985, 2004, and 2011.

Little League Baseball's headquarters for the Southern Region was located in Gulfport until 2009.

== Notable baseball players from the Tampa Bay area ==
Al López, the first area native to play and manage in the major leagues and the first to be enshrined in the Baseball Hall of Fame, came out of the leagues of Ybor City in the early 20th century. Since then, local baseball programs have produced many current and former major league players and managers including Lou Piniella, Fred McGriff, Gary Sheffield, Tino Martinez, Luis Gonzalez, Dwight Gooden, Howard Johnson, Tony La Russa, Chone Figgins, Wade Boggs and Steve Garvey.

== Tampa Baseball Museum ==
The Tampa Baseball Museum, operated by the Ybor City Museum Society, is located in López's former childhood home. The house was moved to its present location across the street from the Ybor City State Museum.
