= Huggins-Stengel Field =

- U.S. National Register of Historic Places
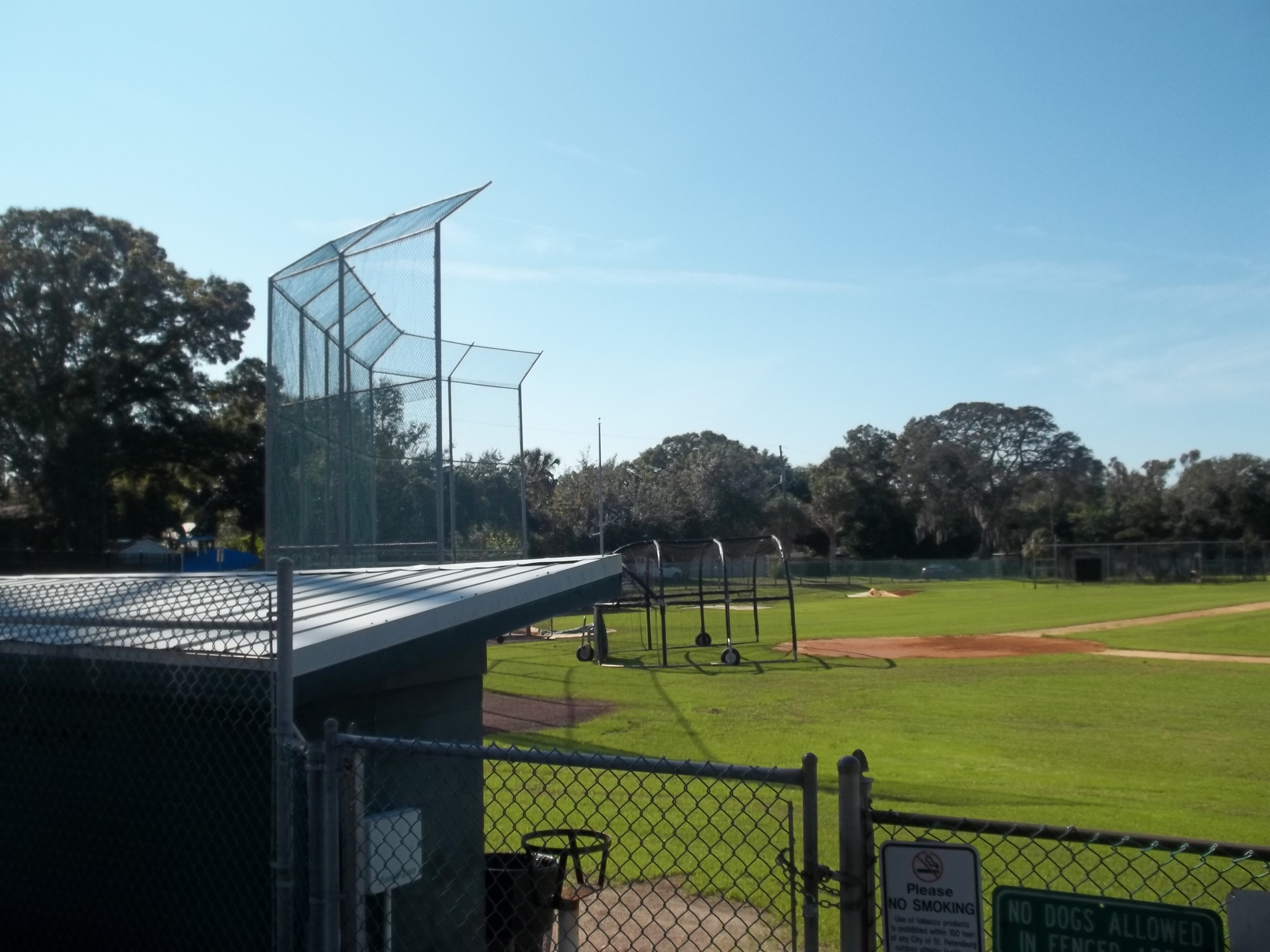

- Location within Florida
- Location: 1320 5th St. North
- Nearest city: St. Petersburg, Florida
- Coordinates: 27.7858°N 82.6401°W
- Built: 1925
- NRHP reference No.: 100004348
- Added to NRHP: August 27, 2019

Huggins-Stengel Field (formerly known as Crescent Lake Field or Miller Huggins Field) is a baseball field located within Crescent Lake Park in St. Petersburg, Florida, United States. It was originally constructed in 1925 as a Spring Training practice field for the New York Yankees and later hosted the New York Mets and Baltimore Orioles. The Yankees held spring training home games in St Petersburg at the field until their move to Al Lang Stadium in 1947. The field is currently used for various high school and collegiate baseball games. The facility was listed on the National Register of Historic Places in 2019.

== History ==
=== Yankees era ===
==== 1925-1942 ====
The New York Yankees christened the facility in 1925 under manager Miller Huggins. Supposedly, they had moved from their previous home in New Orleans to keep Babe Ruth's partying tendencies in check. After the passing of their great manager, the field was renamed Miller Huggins Field in 1931. Featured during this time were Babe Ruth, Lou Gehrig, and Joe DiMaggio.

==== World War II ====
When World War II came to the forefront, travel restrictions became an issue, so the Yankees decided to practice in Atlantic City for the next few years, returning to Crescent Lake in 1946.

==== 1946-1961 ====
After things had calmed from the war, the New York Yankees would return to Crescent Lake and continue their tenure in St. Petersburg, Florida. The Yankees played their home spring training games at Al Lang Stadium beginning in 1947. During the majority of this time period, they were led by manager Casey Stengel, who would lead the club to many championships throughout the 1950s. Players during this era were Mickey Mantle, Roger Maris, Yogi Berra, and top Yankees prospect John Malangone during 1955 spring training. The team moved its spring operations to Fort Lauderdale, Florida following the 1961 season.

=== Mets era ===
==== 1962-1987 ====
The newly created New York Mets would take over operations in Crescent Lake under their newly hired manager Casey Stengel, and in 1963, the field was renamed Huggins-Stengel Field. Like their predecessors, they'd practice in Crescent Lake, then play their games a couple miles down the road at Al Lang Stadium.

=== Orioles era ===
==== 1992-1995 ====
After a short absence of baseball, the field found a new tenant in the Baltimore Orioles in 1992. Unfortunately, the facility was well past its prime at this point. Former Orioles pitcher Rick Sutcliffe noted that the locker room was reminiscent to that of a high school locker room. The team did not stay long, playing its last Spring there in 1995, which would be the end of Spring Training baseball at Huggins-Stengel Field.

== Folklore ==
=== Alligators ===
Story has it that during the first day of practice in 1925, Babe Ruth refused to continue shagging fly balls because alligators had begun to sunbathe along the bank of the lake, which happened to be part of the outfield. Understandably, no player would want to have a close encounter with an alligator while picking up a baseball, so it is understood why he made this protest. In today's rendition of the park, there is a chain link fence separating players from the edge of the lake, reducing the risk of alligator attacks.

=== Home runs ===
Supposedly, only two players are known to have hit a home run that dropped straight into the Crescent Lake itself: Babe Ruth and Dave Kingman.

Darrell Johnson, former teammate of Mickey Mantle's, swears he saw Mickey routinely hit batting practice balls into the lake beyond the right field fence.

Darryl Strawberry earned the nickname "Awesome Strawsome" from teammate Lenny Dykstra after taking Bob Forsch deep for a home run to center field. This was notable due to the deep dimensions of the field and the height of the fence being around 15 feet.

=== Myths ===
People say that the field is haunted by the ghosts of past players.

Some people say that the day after Joe DiMaggio and Mickey Mantle died, a brown patch appeared in center field, where they both used to play.

== Current use ==
The field no longer sees action from Major League Baseball, but still holds practices and games for high school and collegiate teams. There is not much seating, as there are currently only two sets of bleachers, but the nostalgic atmosphere makes a visit very worthwhile. The old clubhouses now serve as offices for TASCO, Teens Arts, Sports, and Cultural Opportunities, a local recreation program. While it is not considered a historical site, some remnants from the old clubhouse are still visible, including an old wooden locker and photographs.

The field has had some work done to it, but it still possesses its original dimensions and has not been raised or lowered like many renovated fields. It is essentially the same turf that the legends played on for the last 90 years.

== See also ==
- Baseball in the Tampa Bay Area
