= Tampa Baseball Museum =

Museum in Tampa, Florida, United States

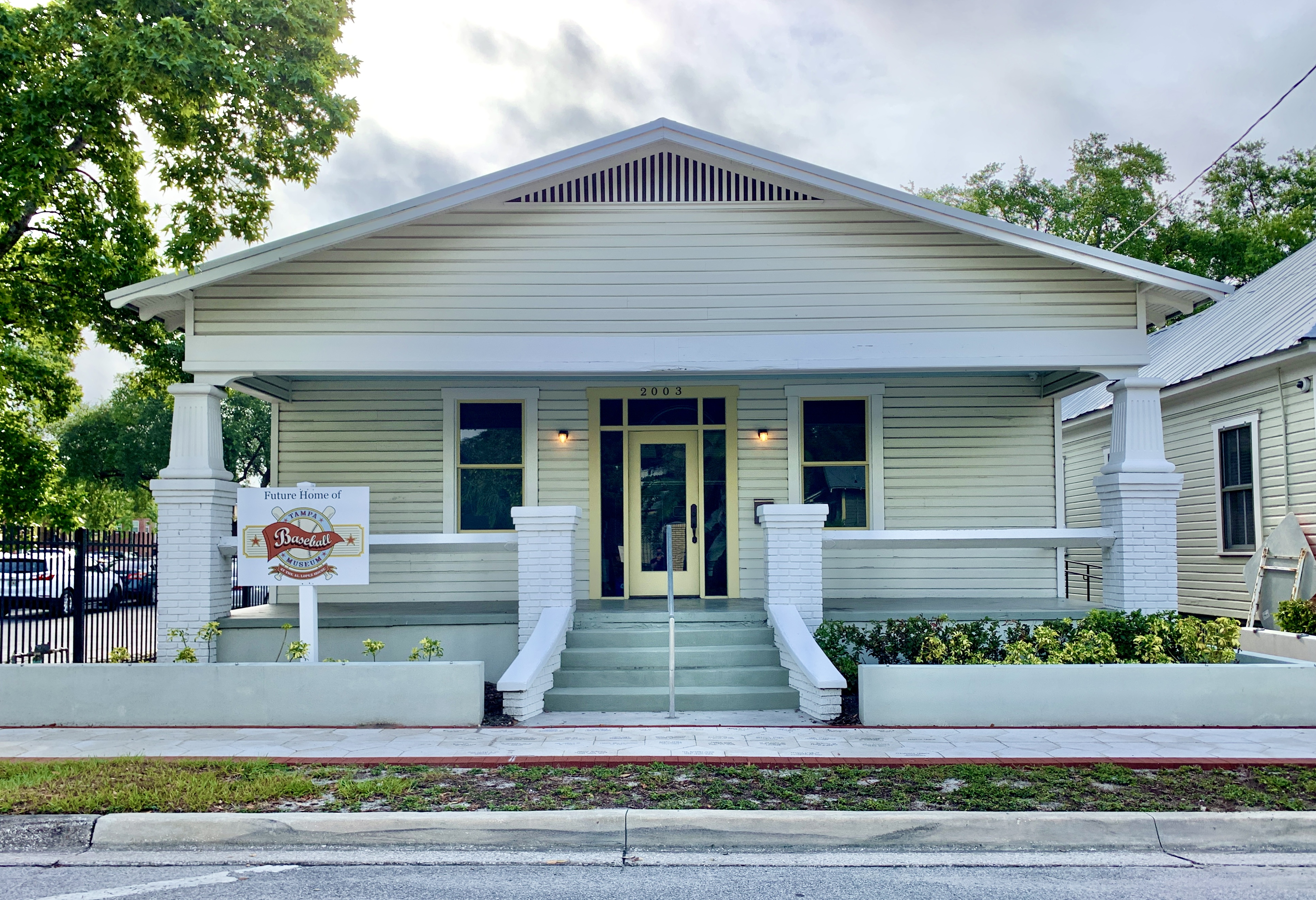
- Purpose: Preserving, promoting, and celebrating the unique cultural heritage of Ybor City & Tampa Baseball Culture.
- Coordinates: 27.962°N 82.4378°W
- Website: Tampa Baseball Museum

The Tampa Baseball Museum is a museum in the Ybor City neighborhood of Tampa, Florida. It is owned and operated by the Ybor City Historical Society. It is housed in the childhood home of hall of famer Al López, the first Tampa native to play and manage in the Major Leagues The house was moved several blocks to a lot near the Ybor City State Museum for the purpose in 2013, and the museum opened in 2021. and the first Tampa Native to be inducted into the MLB Hall of Fame.

The Tampa Baseball Museum includes exhibits that commemorate Al Lopez and the many other major league players and managers from the area along with the city's baseball heritage.
