= Al López =

American baseball player and manager (1908–2005)

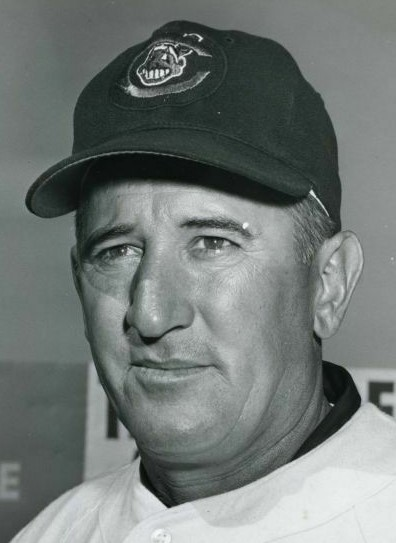
- Catcher / Manager
- Born: August 20, 1908; Tampa, Florida, U.S.
- Died: October 30, 2005 (aged 97); Tampa, Florida, U.S.
- Batted: Right Threw: Right

MLB debut
- September 27, 1928, for the Brooklyn Robins

Last MLB appearance
- September 16, 1947, for the Cleveland Indians

MLB statistics
- Batting average: .261
- Home runs: 51
- Runs batted in: 652
- Managerial record: 1,410–1,004–11
- Winning %: .584
- Stats at Baseball Reference
- Managerial record at Baseball Reference

Teams
- As player: Brooklyn Robins / Dodgers (1928, 1930–1935); Boston Bees (1936–1940); Pittsburgh Pirates (1940–1946); Cleveland Indians (1947); As manager: Cleveland Indians (1951–1956); Chicago White Sox (1957–1965, 1968–1969)

Career highlights and awards
- 2× All-Star (1934, 1941); Cleveland Guardians Hall of Fame

Member of the National

Baseball Hall of Fame
- Induction: 1977
- Election method: Veterans Committee

Alfonso Ramón López (August 20, 1908 – October 30, 2005) was a Spanish-American professional baseball catcher and manager. He played in Major League Baseball (MLB) for the Brooklyn Robins / Dodgers, Boston Bees, Pittsburgh Pirates, and Cleveland Indians between 1928 and 1947, and was the manager for the Cleveland Indians and the Chicago White Sox from 1951 to 1965 and during portions of the 1968 and 1969 seasons. Due to his Spanish ancestry and "gentlemanly" nature, he was nicknamed "El Señor".

As a player, López was a two-time All-Star known for his defensive skills, leadership, and durability, as he established a major league record for career games played at catcher (1,918) that stood for decades. As a manager, his .584 career winning percentage ranks fourth best in major league history among managers of at least 2,000 games. His 1954 Cleveland Indians and 1959 Chicago White Sox teams were the only squads to interrupt the New York Yankees' string of American League pennants from 1949 to 1964, inclusive. Over the course of 18 full seasons as a baseball manager (15 in the major leagues and 3 in the minor leagues), López's teams never finished with a losing record. He was inducted into the Baseball Hall of Fame in 1977.

Al López's parents immigrated to the United States from Spain shortly before his birth, and he grew up in the immigrant community of Ybor City in Tampa, Florida. He retired with his family to his hometown after his baseball career, and his accomplishments were commemorated in Tampa in the name of a baseball stadium (Al López Field) and a public park which bears his name and features his statue. His childhood home was moved next door to the Ybor City State Museum and is the site of the Tampa Baseball Museum.

== Early life ==
Al López was the son of Modesto and Faustina (née Vásquez) López, who were married in Spain before immigrating to Havana, Cuba in the mid-1890s. They had several children in Cuba as Modesto worked as a tabaquero (cigar maker) in one of Havana's many cigar factories. In 1906, Modesto went to the Cuban-Spanish-Italian immigrant community of Ybor City in Tampa, Florida, to seek better wages and living conditions, temporarily leaving his family behind until he had established a home in their new country. Faustina and their six children joined him in Ybor City several months later, and the family made Tampa their permanent home. Alfonso Ramón López, the seventh of nine children, was born there on August 20, 1908.

Ybor City was a thriving immigrant neighborhood during Al López's childhood with a population of over 10,000. The cigar industry was the most important in town, and most residents were employed either by one of the dozens of large cigar factories or by businesses catering to the cigar industry and its employees. Modesto Lopez found work as a skilled selector in a cigar factory, which involved sorting raw tobacco leaves for use in different grades of cigars. Al often visited his father's workplace as a child and later said that he "hated" the smell of tobacco leaves that permeated the building and clung to his father's clothing when he came home from the factory. "I vowed never to work in one."

As a teenager, López took a job delivering Cuban bread door to door for La Joven Francesca Bakery, which was located in a building which later became the Ybor City State Museum. He began to follow baseball when his elder brother Emilio introduced him to the game during the 1920 World Series, which coincidentally involved two teams that Lopez would later play for - Cleveland and Brooklyn. According to Al López, his brother Emilio also had excellent baseball talent, but he himself was more driven to excel at the game.

== Baseball player ==
López's professional career began in 1924 when, at the age of 16, he signed on as a catcher with the Class-D Tampa Smokers of the Florida State League, quitting his job at the bakery and dropping out of high school at Sacred Heart College (later known as Jesuit High School) to focus on baseball. His starting salary with the Smokers was $150 ($2,818 today) per month, which was much needed by the large Lopez family since his father's health was deteriorating and he could not work regularly. (Modesto Lopez died of throat cancer in 1926.)

Soon after signing with the Smokers, Al López impressed Hall of Fame pitcher Walter Johnson with his catching skills during a winter barnstorming exhibition game. At Johnson's recommendation, Al was hired as a practice catcher for the Washington Senators during spring training in 1925, a valuable learning opportunity that he later credited with making him a better ballplayer. The Senators offered the Smokers $1000 for López's contract, but the minor league club demanded $10,000, which the major league club thought too exorbitant for a young player with only one year of professional baseball experience. Instead, López moved steadily up the minor leagues ranks in subsequent seasons and made his major league debut in 1928 with Brooklyn.

After splitting time between the major and minor leagues for two seasons, López became the Dodgers' primary catcher in 1930 at the age of 21, and he remained a regular starter in the major leagues over the next 17 seasons. His best offensive campaign came in 1933, when he hit .301, stole 10 bases, and finished 10th in National League MVP voting. Overall, he compiled modest career batting numbers, including 613 runs, 51 home runs, and 652 RBIs and a .261 batting average. He was better known for his defense, leadership, and his ability to work with various pitchers, which earned him two trips to the All-Star game and respect around the league.

Over a major league playing career which ran from 1928 until 1947, López played for the Brooklyn Robins / Dodgers (1928, 1930-1935), Boston Bees (1936-1940), Pittsburgh Pirates (1940-1946) and Cleveland Indians (1947). In 1945, López surpassed Gabby Hartnett's major league record for career games as a catcher, and when he retired after the 1947 season, his major league record for games caught stood at 1,918. This record was not broken until 1987 by Bob Boone, and the National League record was broken by Gary Carter in 1990. He caught 117 shutouts during his career, ranking him 13th all-time among major league catchers.

Lopez was also last player to hit a home run that bounced over the fence, which happened on September 12, 1930. The rule was changed the following year to make such a hit a ground-rule double.

== Baseball manager ==
=== Minor leagues ===
López decided to seek a job as a baseball coach or manager upon retiring after the 1947 season, which he'd spent as the backup catcher for the Cleveland Indians. Bill Veeck, the new owner of the team, was unhappy with how Indians player-manager Lou Boudreau had handled the club, and he asked López if he would be interested in taking the position. López declined, explaining that he did not want to appear to have undermined Boudreau to steal his job and preferred to gain managerial experience with another club. The decision was a positive one for both parties, as the Indians won the 1948 World Series and Boudreau was named the American League MVP.

Meanwhile, López began his managing career in 1948 with the Indianapolis Indians, the Pittsburgh Pirates's Class AAA minor league affiliate. He spent three years in Indianapolis, leading his squads to one first place and two second-place finishes in the American Association while also serving as the team's reserve catcher. Before the 1950 season, López re-signed with the Indianapolis Indians for the largest salary of any manager in American Association history, with a clause in his contract which allowed for him to leave if offered a managerial position with a major league club.

=== Major Leagues ===
==== Cleveland Indians ====
After having declined an opportunity to become the club's manager in 1947, López accepted an offer to become the Cleveland Indians's new manager in 1951. Under López, the Indians won over 90 games each season from 1951 to 1953, but came in second to the New York Yankees each year. In 1954, Lopez's squad won a then-American League record 111 games to capture the AL pennant, but were swept by Willie Mays and the New York Giants in the 1954 World Series in one of the biggest upsets in World Series history. Lopez's Indians again finished in second place behind the Yankees in 1955 and 1956. During the latter season, López became "incensed" at Cleveland fans and management as the season progressed. Star third baseman Al Rosen slumped late in the year while playing injured, and López felt that the Indians' team management had not supported or defended his injured player from fans' booing and criticism. López was so disheartened over the situation that he resigned from the club on the last day of the season. Lopez finished his Indians career with a record of 570 wins and 354 losses, and his .617 winning percentage is still the best in franchise history.

==== Chicago White Sox ====
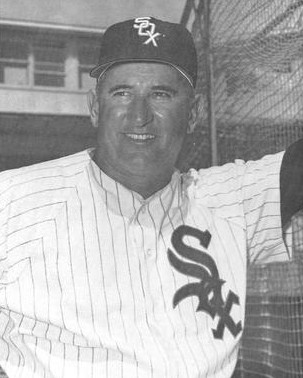
López in 1965

Lopez agreed to become the new manager of the Chicago White Sox about a month after resigning in Cleveland. The White Sox did not have the power hitters of Lopez's Cleveland teams, but they had more speed with players such as Nellie Fox, Minnie Miñoso and Luis Aparicio. Consequently, López changed his offensive strategy to fit the roster. The White Sox stole over 100 bases every season from 1957 to 1961, consistently leading the American League in that category and often almost doubling the total of the next highest team, earning them the nickname "Go-Go Sox".

In 1957, his first year in Chicago, López's White Sox won 90 games and finished in second place behind the Yankees while the Indians suffered through a losing season. Chicago again finished second in 1958, but finally broke through and won the American League pennant in 1959, losing to the Los Angeles Dodgers in the World Series. By this time, Lopez was very well respected and in-demand manager, and in the middle of the 1960 season, a friend of New York Yankees president Dan Topping told an Associated Press reporter that López would replace Yankees manager Casey Stengel. (Stengel had managed López years earlier when López was a catcher for Brooklyn and Boston.) Despite rumored and confirmed inquiries from other teams, López stayed with Chicago until 1965, finishing in second place five times and never posting fewer than 82 wins.

López retired to the White Sox front office after the 1965 season due to a chronic stomach condition and assumed the title of team vice president. He returned to managing in July 1968, when White Sox manager Eddie Stanky was fired. Lopez was able to get most of his former coaches to return to the team. However, he had to undergo an appendectomy shortly after taking over as manager and missed most of the rest of the season. He agreed to manage the White Sox again in 1969, but continuing health issues forced him to resign in early May, less than a month into the season.

=== Managing style ===
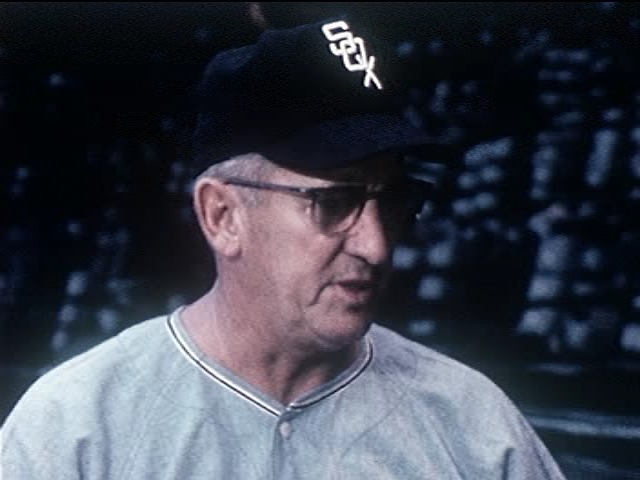
López, circa 1966

López was known for never scolding or shouting at his players and avoiding pep talks in lieu of constructive criticism. Indians owner Bill Veeck commented that López's only fault as a manager was that he was "too decent", a description that López took as a compliment. Veeck also said that López's "completely relaxed" leadership "squeezed every drop of talent out of his teams".

Describing López and his managerial style, a 1957 Sports Illustrated piece said, "For Lopez, managing is a constant worry, a nervous strain, a jittery agony. Some managers thus beset relieve the harrowing pressure by exploding in sudden rages at players and sportswriters, or else by maintaining an almost sphinx-like silence in an effort to remain calm. But Lopez is a gentleman — a decent, thoughtful, exceptionally courteous man. He seldom permits himself the luxury of a temper tantrum, and he talks to anyone who talks to him." Later, his son shared that, while he did not demonstratively show it, his father hated to lose, and suffered from chronic insomnia and stomach issues during the baseball season.

Tommy John, who spent 26 years in MLB, said "Lopez had a better handle on all the facets of the game than any manager I ever played for. He knew about hitting, offense, defense, pitching, catching, and strategy. The Senior, as he was dubbed, also understood player psychology, and knew how to communicate with his players. He was tough to play for in that he demanded so much out of you, but that just made you a better performer. Al was the type of manager who was smart enough, and secure enough, not to overmanage. He threw the bats and balls out on the field and simply let you play."

Because of his Spanish ancestry and his "gentlemanly" nature, López was given the nickname "El Señor".

=== Managerial record ===
López's .584 winning percentage is 9th all time in Major League Baseball history. At the time of his retirement, his 1,410 MLB managerial wins ranked 11th all-time, and were the 26th most wins as of the end of the 2016 season. In 18 full seasons as a minor league and major league manager, he never had a losing record. His 1954 Indians and 1959 White Sox teams were the only non-Yankee clubs to win the AL pennant between 1949 and 1964 inclusive, and his 840 wins with the White Sox still rank second in franchise history, behind Jimmy Dykes (899).

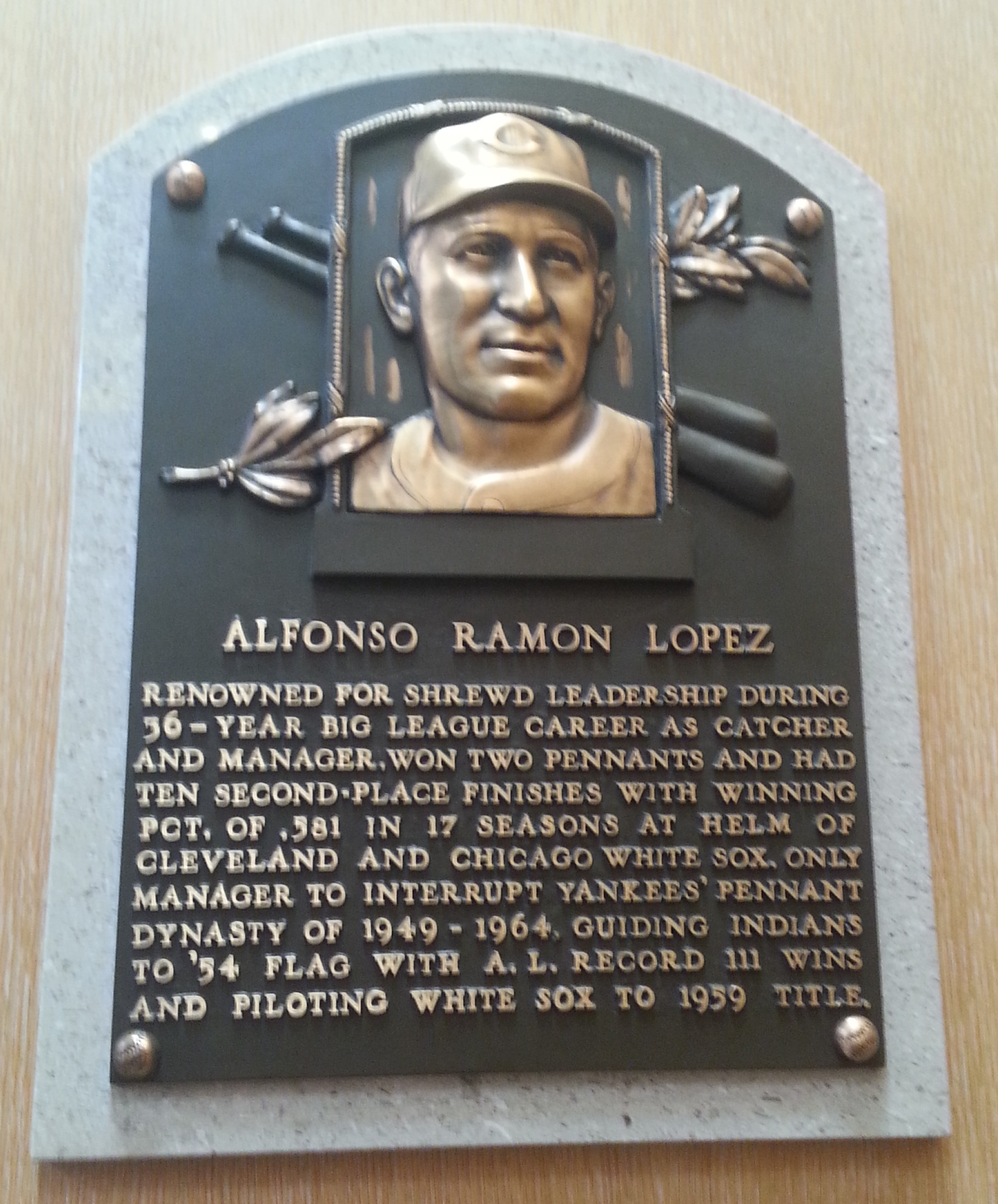
Al López's plaque at the Baseball Hall of Fame

| Team | Year | Regular season | | | | | Postseason | | | |
| Team | Year | Games | Won | Lost | Win % | Finish | Won | Lost | Win % | Result |
|---|---|---|---|---|---|---|---|---|---|---|
| CLE | 1951 | 154 | 93 | 61 | .604 | 2nd in AL | – | – | – | – |
| CLE | 1952 | 154 | 93 | 61 | .604 | 2nd in AL | – | – | – | – |
| CLE | 1953 | 154 | 92 | 62 | .597 | 2nd in AL | – | – | – | – |
| CLE | 1954 | 154 | 111 | 43 | .721 | 1st in AL | 0 | 4 | .000 | Lost World Series (NYG) |
| CLE | 1955 | 154 | 91 | 63 | .591 | 2nd in AL | – | – | – | – |
| CLE | 1956 | 154 | 88 | 66 | .571 | 2nd in AL | – | – | – | – |
| CLE total | | 924 | 570 | 354 | .617 | | 0 | 4 | .000 | |
| CWS | 1957 | 154 | 90 | 64 | .584 | 2nd in AL | – | – | – | – |
| CWS | 1958 | 154 | 82 | 72 | .532 | 2nd in AL | – | – | – | – |
| CWS | 1959 | 154 | 94 | 60 | .610 | 1st in AL | 2 | 4 | .333 | Lost World Series (LAD) |
| CWS | 1960 | 154 | 87 | 67 | .565 | 3rd in AL | – | – | – | – |
| CWS | 1961 | 162 | 86 | 76 | .531 | 4th in AL | – | – | – | – |
| CWS | 1962 | 162 | 85 | 77 | .525 | 5th in AL | – | – | – | – |
| CWS | 1963 | 162 | 94 | 68 | .580 | 2nd in AL | – | – | – | – |
| CWS | 1964 | 162 | 98 | 64 | .605 | 2nd in AL | – | – | – | – |
| CWS | 1965 | 162 | 95 | 67 | .586 | 2nd in AL | – | – | – | – |
| CWS | 1968 | 11 | 6 | 5 | .545 | leave | – | – | – | – |
| CWS | 1968 | 36 | 15 | 21 | .417 | 8th in AL | – | – | – | – |
| CWS | 1969 | 17 | 8 | 9 | .471 | resigned | – | – | – | – |
| CWS total | | 1490 | 840 | 650 | .564 | | 2 | 4 | .333 | |
| Total | | 2414 | 1410 | 1004 | .584 | | 2 | 8 | .200 | |

== Personal life and legacy ==
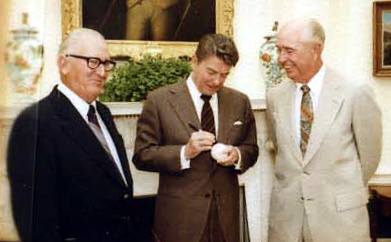
Al López (at left) with Ronald Reagan and Walter Alston, 1982

Al López met Evelyn "Connie" Kearney, a dancer at the Hollywood Club in New York, while he was playing for Brooklyn in the early 1930s, and the couple often went on double dates with teammate Tony Cuccinello and his wife. When López was traded to Boston in 1935, he and Connie found it difficult to conduct a long-distance relationship, so she soon joined him. They married on October 7, 1939, and had a son, Al Jr., in 1940.

=== Honors ===
Al and Connie López retired to his hometown in 1970 to live near family and friends. López was the first Tampa native to play in the major leagues, the first to manage a major league team, the first to manage his team to a World Series (Lou Piniella, Tony La Russa, and Kevin Cash did so later), and the first to be inducted into the Baseball Hall of Fame. As such, he was the recipient of many honors in his hometown, both during and after his long baseball career.

Lopez was the manager of the Cleveland Indians and had just led them to the World Series when the city of Tampa built a new minor league and spring training ballpark. It was named Al López Field, and the date of the dedication ceremony (October 6, 1954) was declared "Al López Day" in the city of Tampa. The Chicago White Sox were the ballpark's first spring training tenants, and when Lopez became the new White Sox manager in 1957, he had the unusual honor for several seasons of managing home games in his hometown in a ballpark named after himself. Later in life, López would recall a spring training incident in which an umpire with whom he was arguing threatened to throw him out of a game there. "You can't throw me out of this ballpark", protested Lopez, "This is my ballpark – Al López Field!" The umpire ejected him anyway, causing Lopez to exclaim, "He threw me out of my own ballpark!"

López was selected for induction into the Baseball Hall of Fame by the Veterans Committee as part of the Class of 1977. He served as the AL's honorary team captain in the 1990 Major League Baseball All-Star Game.

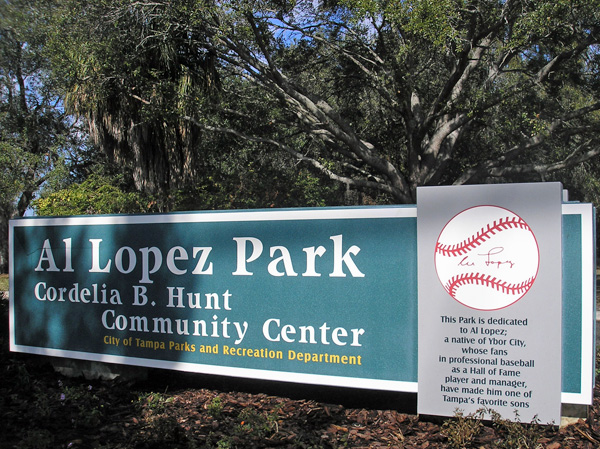

Al López Field was demolished in 1989 to make room for a potential major league facility that was never built. López lived a few miles from the ballpark that bore his name. In a 1992 interview, he said that the razing of the stadium "wasn't very disappointing. I saw a diagram of the new stadium, and I didn't feel bad because I thought they were going to build a bigger one and a better one. After that, something happened, and they never built the ballpark. Then it was a disappointment." Soon thereafter, the city of Tampa changed the name of Horizon Park, a large city park near the site of the razed stadium, to Al López Park, and installed a large statue of López in his catching gear. The statue was dedicated on October 3, 1992, a date which was officially proclaimed as a second "Al López Day" in the city. Soon thereafter, his high school, Jesuit High School, which is located across the street from Al López Park, named its new athletic center in Lopez's honor.

When the expansion Tampa Bay Devil Rays began play in 1998 in nearby St. Petersburg, Lopez threw one of several ceremonial first pitches along with fellow Hall of Famers Ted Williams, Stan Musial, and Monte Irvin. The Rays annually award the "Al López Award" to the "most outstanding rookie" in the team's spring camp each year.

In 2013, López's boyhood home was moved to a lot across the street from the Ybor City State Museum, where it is undergoing renovation to become the "Tampa Baseball Museum at the Al López House".

=== Death ===
Al López died on October 30, 2005, at the age of 97 after suffering a heart attack at his son's home. His death came four days after the White Sox won the 2005 World Series, their first world championship in 88 years and their first AL pennant since Lopez had led them to the World Series in 1959. Lopez was the last living person who had played major league baseball during the 1920s, and was the longest-lived member of the Baseball Hall of Fame until Bobby Doerr passed him in 2015.

Connie López had died in September 1983. Al López was survived by his son, three grandchildren, and nine great-grandchildren.

== See also ==
- List of Major League Baseball managers with most career ejections
- List of Major League Baseball managers with most career wins
