= Coffee Pot Park =

American historical baseball park in St. Petersburg, Florida

- Interactive map of Coffee Pot Park
- Former names: Sunshine Park on Coffee Pot Bayou
- Location: 22nd Ave N & 1st St N St Petersburg, FL 33704
- Coordinates: 27.792169°N 82.634426°W
- Capacity: 500-850
- Surface: Grass
- Field size: Left Field – ft Center Field – ft Right Field – ft

Construction
- Opened: 1914

Tenants
- St. Petersburg Saints (Independent) (1914–1919) (FSL) (1920–1928); St. Louis Browns (AL) (spring training) (1914); Philadelphia Phillies (NL) (spring training) (1915–1918); Indianapolis Indians (AA) (spring training) (1921)

Coffee Pot Park was a ballpark in St. Petersburg, Florida home to the St. Petersburg Saints minor-league baseball team until 1928, and spring training home of the St. Louis Browns and Philadelphia Phillies. Its capacity was approximately 850 for baseball. The park was named for the nearby Coffee Pot Bayou. The field was also used by local high school teams and for amateur softball. The ballpark was replaced in 1922 by Waterfront Park as the home to spring training in St. Pete.

== History ==
A 1929 article in the Evening Independent cites the location of the diamond as being "built where the Snell Isle golf course now reposes." The Snell Isle was incorporated into the Sunset Golf Club which was eventually absorbed into what today is the Renaissance Vinoy Resort and Golf Club. But in 1965, Fred Lieb wrote that the park was located at First Street North and 22nd Avenue in the "Granada Terrace" section of the city. In 1966, Ken Goldman also wrote that the address of the ballpark had been at "First Street North and 22nd Avenue" which by today's map would place the park southwest of Coffee Pot Bayou.

John C. Skipper, in his book Wicked Curve, describes Coffee Pot Park as follows: "The park itself was about as plain as its name, with one shower (that produced only cold water) and a wooden grandstand that held about 500 people – if 400 of them were thin. The park was on a bayou, and many of the players brought fishing poles to the ballpark and threw in a line to relax between practices.

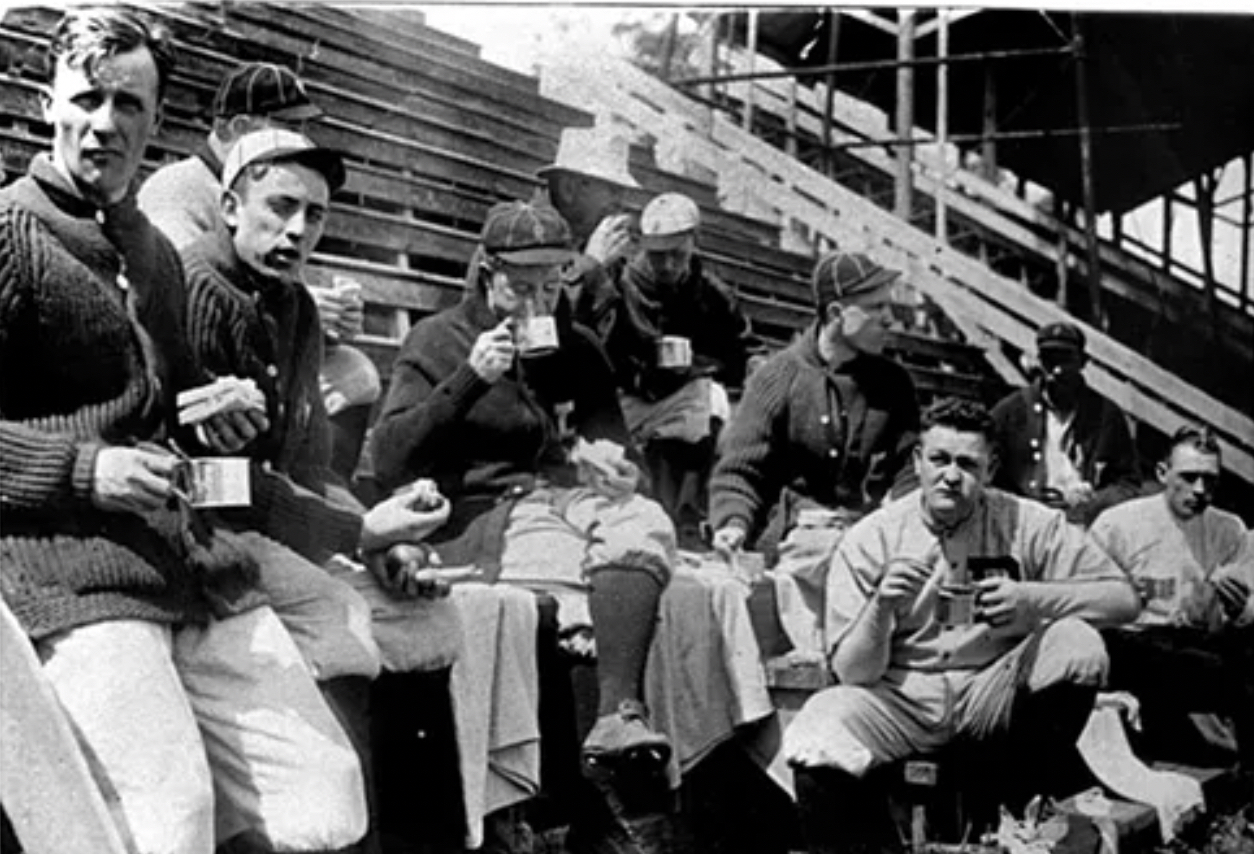
Philadelphia Phillies players during spring training at Coffee Pot Park in 1915

The Saint Petersburg Saints minor-league team played at the ballpark from as early as the 1914 season. An account of a 1916 game against Tampa recounts that the game was called in the seventh-inning "in order that the visitors could catch the boat back to Tampa." The Saints joined the Florida State League in 1920, one year after its inception in 1919.

St. Petersburg mayor Al Lang attracted the St. Louis Browns to the city in 1914. In the first game, the Chicago Cubs came by boat across the bay from their spring home in Tampa. The Cubs beat the Browns 3–2, as 4,000 fans paid from 25 cents (for bleachers) to $1 (for a box seat).

The Philadelphia Phillies trained at the ballpark from 1915 through 1918. Manager Pat Moran made the players walk the 2 miles (3.2 km) from their hotel in downtown St. Petersburg to the ballpark every day. Phillies owner and president William Baker considered purchasing land adjacent to the ballpark and constructing a "permanent southern base" with hotel and clubhouse.

Top minor league clubs used to hold their own spring training camps; the Indianapolis Indians trained at the ballpark in 1921.

== See also ==
- Baseball in the Tampa Bay area
- Progress Energy Park
