= Al Lang Stadium =

Sports stadium in downtown St. Petersburg, Florida

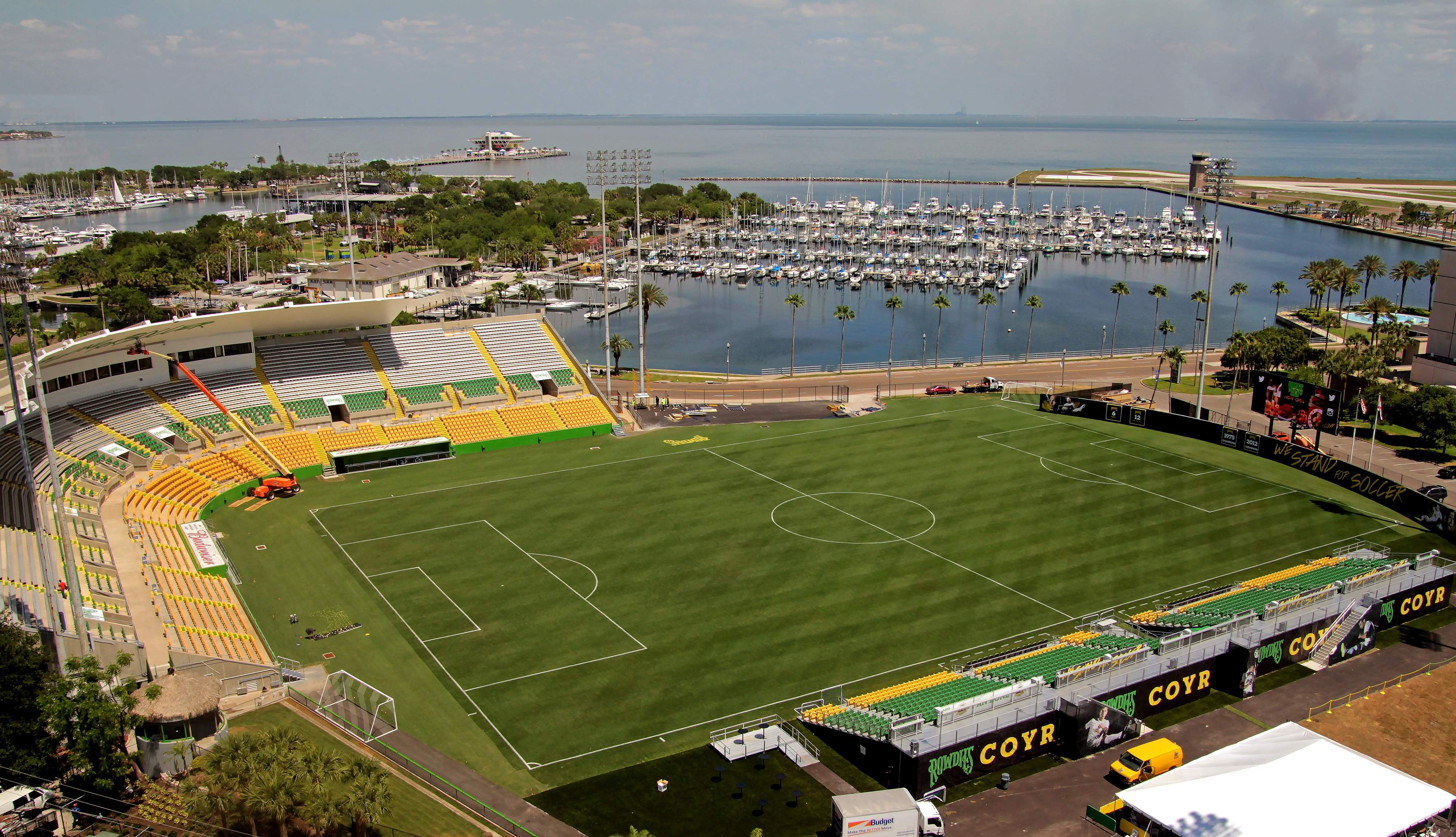
- Al Lang Stadium in 2015

- Location in Florida Location in the United States
- Former names: Florida Power Park (1998–2002); Progress Energy Park (2003–2011)
- Location: 180 2nd Avenue SE; St. Petersburg, Florida
- Coordinates: 27.7681°N 82.6331°W
- Owner: City of St. Petersburg
- Operator: Big 3 Entertainment
- Capacity: 7,227
- Surface: Grass
- Field size: 110 x 75yd

Construction
- Opened: 1947
- Renovated: 1976, 1996, 2015
- Cost: $300,000 (original)

Tenants
- New York Yankees (MLB) (spring training) (1947–1950, 1952–1961); St. Louis Cardinals (MLB) (spring training) (1947–1997); St. Petersburg Saints (FIL/FSL) (1947–1965); New York Giants (MLB) (spring training) (1951); New York Mets (MLB) (spring training) (1962–1987); St. Petersburg Pelicans (SPBA) (1989–1990); St. Petersburg Cardinals (FSL) (1965–1997); Baltimore Orioles (MLB) (spring training) (1991–1995); St. Petersburg Devil Rays (FSL) (1998–2000); Tampa Bay Devil Rays/Rays (MLB) (spring training) (1998–2008); Tampa Bay Rowdies (USLC) (2011–present); Tampa Bay Rowdies U23 (USL2) (2017; 2020); Rowdies Women (WPSL) (2020)

Al Lang Stadium is a 7,500-seat sports stadium along the waterfront of downtown St. Petersburg, Florida, United States, which was used almost exclusively as a baseball park for over 60 years. Since 2011, it has been the home field of the Tampa Bay Rowdies of the USL Championship soccer league.

Al Lang Stadium was built in 1947 at the site of an older facility known as St. Petersburg Athletic Park. It is named in honor of Al Lang, a former mayor of St. Petersburg who was instrumental in bringing minor league and spring training baseball to the city in the early 20th century. Al Lang Stadium was the spring training home of the St. Louis Cardinals of Major League Baseball from 1948 until 1997, with other teams occasionally sharing use of the facility for a few seasons at a time. During the summer, the ballpark was the home field for the Cardinal's minor league franchise in the Florida State League. The Cardinals moved out in 1998, when St. Petersburg gained their own MLB team and the Tampa Bay Devil Rays used Al Lang Stadium as their first spring training venue and minor league ballpark. The Rays constructed a new training facility in Charlotte County a few years later, and Al Lang Stadium hosted its last spring training game in March 2008.

The stadium was the site of exhibition and amateur baseball for the next few years until the Tampa Bay Rowdies moved to St. Petersburg from Tampa in 2011. It was incrementally modified into a soccer venue over each of the following off-seasons until October 2014, when the club and the city signed an agreement giving the team more control of the facility, and more extensive renovations were undertaken to expand seating on both sides of the field and improve the fan experience. Though former Rowdies' majority owner Bill Edwards proposed expanding the stadium's capacity to 18,000 seats as part of a bid to move the club into Major League Soccer (MLS), the plans were not realized. In 2018, Edwards sold the club to the Tampa Bay Rays ownership group in a deal which also transferred control of Al Lang Stadium.

== History ==
=== Background ===
Professional baseball grew throughout the United States at the beginning of the twentieth century, and clubs sought additional facilities to accommodate their spring training. Al Lang, a businessman in St. Petersburg, saw a huge potential to attract northeastern teams to his city to take advantage of the warm weather during the early months of the year. Lang and city officials created an incentives package that covered teams' travel expenses and other amenities, which drew in the city's first spring training tenant, the St. Louis Browns, in 1914. The club trained at Coffee Pot Park, a small ballpark located beside Coffee Pot bayou about a mile north of the current site of Al Lang Stadium. Subsequently, other Major League Baseball clubs such as the Philadelphia Phillies and the New York Yankees came to St. Petersburg for spring training, and Lang continued promoting the city when he was elected Mayor of St. Petersburg in 1916. After his term, Lang devoted his life to building a successful connection between Florida and baseball, and was instrumental in marketing St. Petersburg as a desirable sports site.

With Al Lang's support, the city replaced Coffee Pot Park with St. Petersburg Athletic Park (also known as Waterfront Park) on the present site of Al Lang Stadium in 1923. It served as the spring training home for Major League Baseball teams the Boston Braves and the New York Yankees until after World War II, hosting baseball greats such as Babe Ruth, Lou Gehrig, Joe DiMaggio, and Stan Musial.

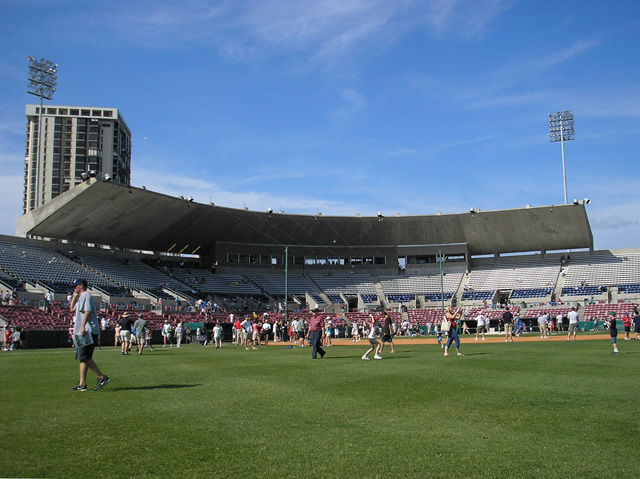
The grandstand at Al Lang Stadium

=== Current stadium ===
In 1947, the city of St. Petersburg demolished Waterfront Park and constructed a modern baseball park on the same site. It was named Al Lang Stadium in honor of his many years of service to the city and his continual promotion of baseball in the area. The St. Louis Cardinals and New York Yankees shared the new ballpark in its first spring training season.

The stadium underwent a major reconstruction in 1976, expanding its capacity to 7,227. It was renovated again in 1996; the project cost $640,117 and included disability accommodations. When the expansion Tampa Bay Devil Rays began using the park for spring training in 1998, local utility Florida Power purchased the park's naming rights for $150,000 per year, and the city rechristened it Florida Power Park at Al Lang Field. When Florida Power was acquired by Progress Energy in 2003, the stadium's name was changed to Progress Energy Park. The naming rights agreement expired in 2011, and the facility's name reverted to Al Lang Stadium.

==== Description ====
Al Lang Stadium's grandstand faces the southeast, giving almost every seat a view of the St. Petersburg harbor and Tampa Bay beyond the left field wall. The stadium is constructed primarily of reinforced concrete, and the public portions of the facility include very few enclosed and air conditioned areas. A unique concrete cantilevered overhang shades many of the grandstand seats from the afternoon sun, and the stadium's waterfront location is often cooled by a sea breeze. During the 2015 renovation, the Rowdies replaced all of the seats in the grandstand, refreshed fan areas under the grandstand, and extensively updated many of the club and gameday operation areas. In addition, a portion of the outfield wall was removed and two banks of uncovered bleachers installed in its place, adding several hundred seats on the sideline of the soccer field opposite the grandstand.

==== 2024 hurricane impacts ====
Due to damage incurred by Hurricane Helene and Hurricane Milton upon the stadium and surrounding area, the Tampa Bay Rowdies were forced to play their final two home games of the 2024 USL Championship season at IMG Academy's Soccer Complex in Bradenton.

== Tenants and events ==
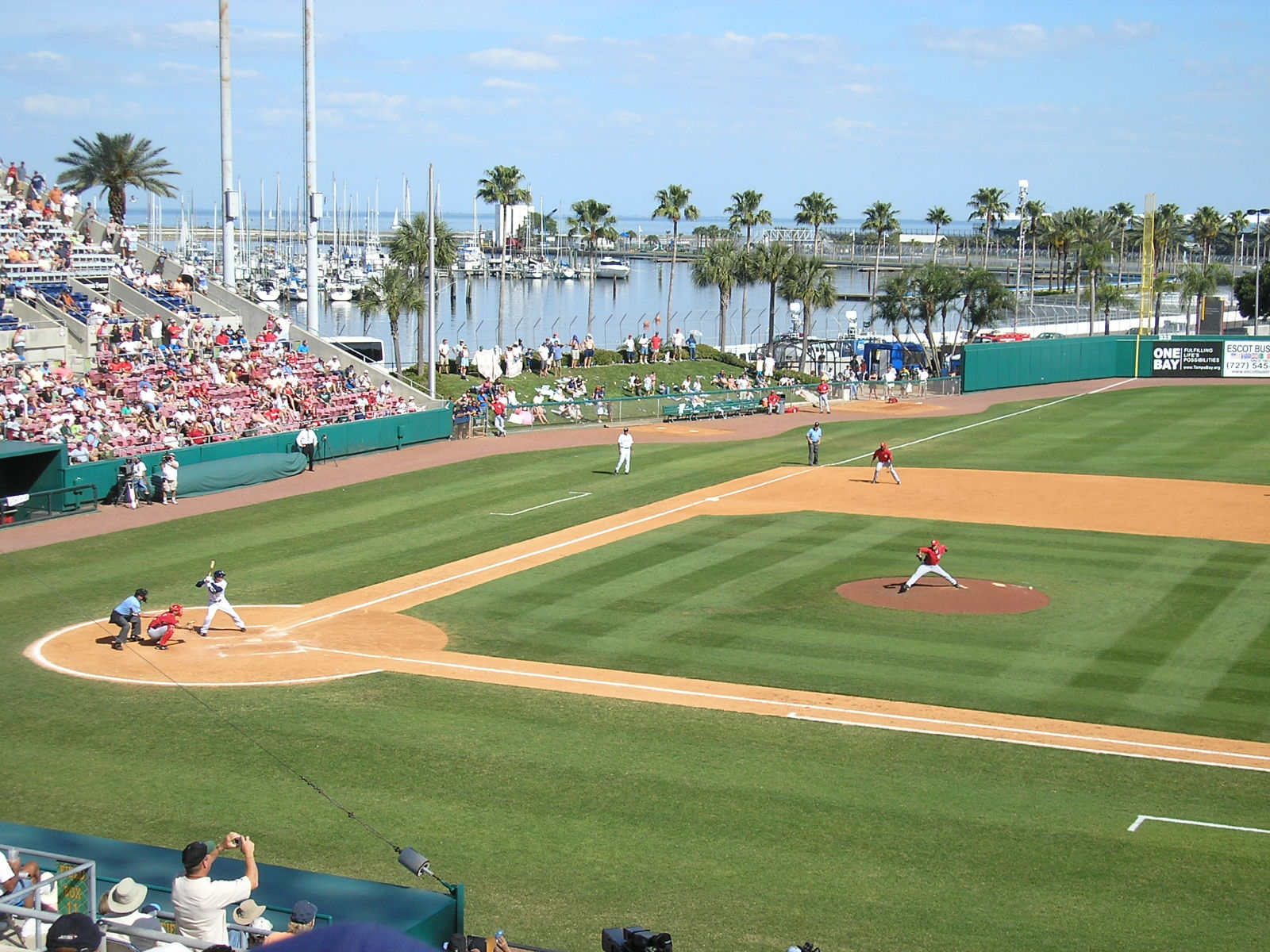
Baseball at the stadium – last pitch of the final spring game on March 28, 2008

=== Baseball ===
Al Lang Stadium was originally designed and built for baseball, and it has hosted many thousands of major league spring training, minor league, college, high school, international. and exhibition baseball games over the decades.

==== Professional baseball ====
Al Lang Stadium was originally built as a spring training and minor league venue and served that purpose from 1947 until 2008. Spring training tenants included the New York Yankees, St. Louis Cardinals, New York Giants, New York Mets, and Baltimore Orioles. Minor league tenants included the St. Petersburg Saints of the Florida International League and the St. Petersburg Cardinals of the Florida State League. Al Lang Stadium's final minor league tenant was the Class A St. Petersburg Devil Rays, who last played at the stadium in 2000.

In 1998, the expansion Tampa Bay Devil Rays began using the stadium for spring training. Their regular season home at Tropicana Field is approximately one mile west, making the Devil Rays the first major league team to train and play regular season games in the same city in almost 90 years. In 2006, the Rays, seeking to expand their fan base across the Tampa Bay area, decided to move their spring training operations to Charlotte Sports Park in Port Charlotte, about 80 miles south of St. Petersburg. They played their last spring training ballgame at Al Lang Stadium on March 28, 2008.

==== Amateur baseball ====
Baseball in the Tampa Bay area has a long history, and amateur baseball has long been played in Al Lang Stadium and its predecessors in downtown St. Petersburg. Many different tournament, exhibition, practice, and regular season games have been held there, with the University of South Florida St. Petersburg club baseball program the last amateur team to call Al Lang Stadium home during their inaugural season of 2014.

Al Lang Stadium was the primary host of the 1974 Amateur World Series, the first and only edition of the tournament (later renamed the Baseball World Cup) to be held in the United States. It was the site of the opening ceremonies as well as the final playoff series between the United States and Nicaragua.

The 1997 and 2002 ACC Tournaments were played at the venue, as was the 2000 Conference USA baseball tournament. From 2010 to 2014, Al Lang Stadium hosted the St. Petersburg International Baseball Series, which involved international teams, national teams, and local college and high school teams along with minor league squads from various major league organizations that were already in the area for spring training. The event moved to other local venues in 2015.

After the Tampa Bay Rowdies moved to Al Lang Stadium in 2011, the playing surface and seating arrangement had to be constantly alternated between baseball and soccer configurations, especially in the spring. The resulting poor condition of the turf led to complaints by Rowdies management and, in October 2014, an agreement that baseball would not be played at the facility.

=== Soccer ===
In 2011, the soccer team FC Tampa Bay of the North American Soccer League announced it would move to Al Lang Stadium from George M. Steinbrenner Field in Tampa. This ended three years in which the stadium had no long-term tenant. Al Lang Stadium subsequently underwent minor renovations to convert it into a soccer facility, with temporary seats added on the grass along the sidelines to increase capacity. The team played its first game at Al Lang on April 9, 2011, and later changed its name to the Tampa Bay Rowdies, after the historical team that had played from 1975 to 1993.

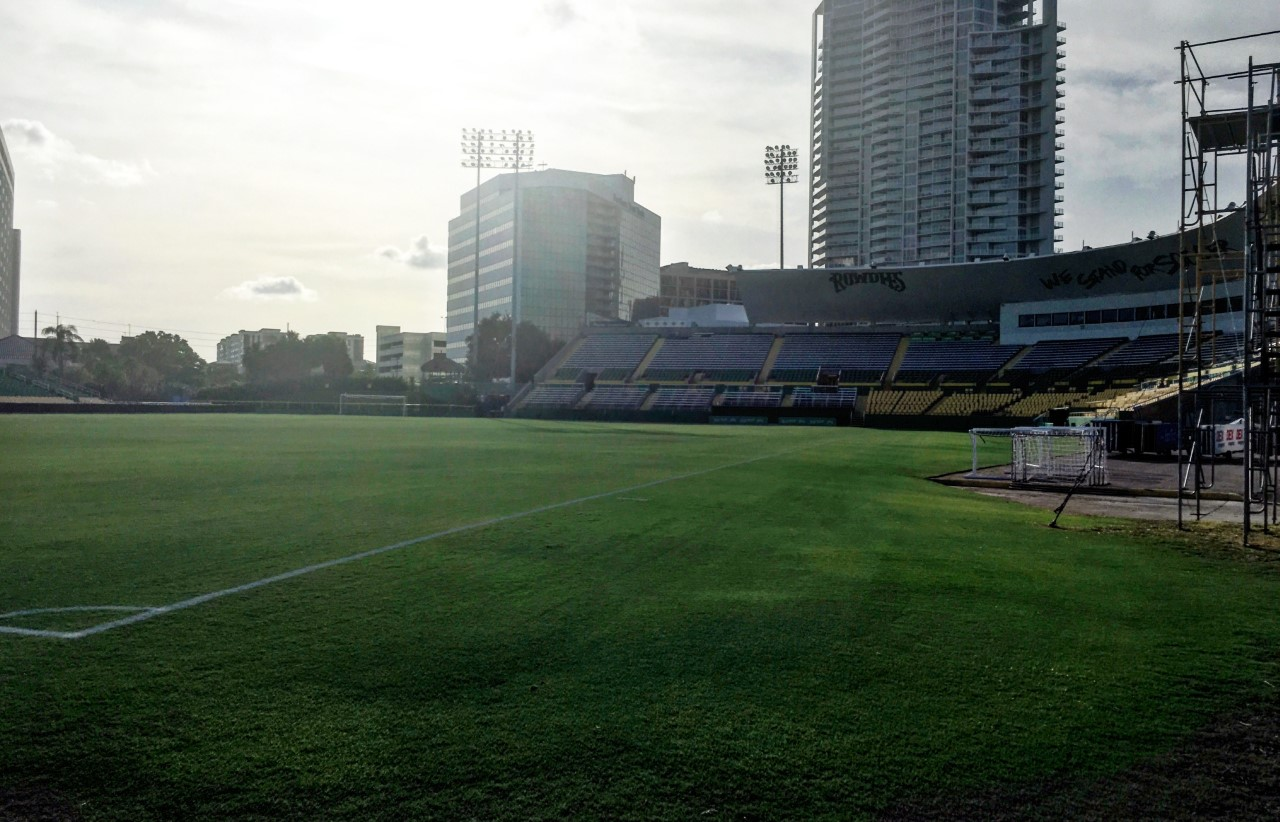
Al Lang Stadium in July 2020.

On October 27, 2012, the Tampa Bay Rowdies became the 2012 NASL Champions by winning the two-leg Soccer Bowl against the Minnesota Stars at Al Lang Stadium. It was the first time that a major championship was held at the site. In 2013, the Rowdies signed a lease extension keeping the team at Al Lang Stadium through the 2016 season.

In 2014, Rowdies majority owner Bill Edwards publicly complained that the city of St. Petersburg and the St. Petersburg Baseball Commission, which managed Al Lang Stadium, had not kept up with maintenance on the grandstand, the locker rooms, or the playing field. This was partially due to the fact that although the Rowdies have been the only regular tenant of Al Lang Stadium since 2011, it was regularly used for exhibition and amateur baseball during the spring, necessitating that the playing surface be converted for soccer use by removing the pitcher's mound and replacing the infield dirt with grass. The dispute resulted in the Rowdies filing a lawsuit against the St. Petersburg Baseball Commission in July 2014 claiming that the commission was not properly maintaining the "dilapidated" facility.

==== Transfer of stadium management ====
The issues were finally resolved in October 2014 when Edwards and the city of St. Petersburg brokered a deal that gave Edwards' Big 3 Entertainment company management control of Al Lang Stadium for the next four years. As part of the arrangement, the facility would no longer be used for baseball events, and Edwards agreed to complete $1.5 million in renovations as he sought to make Al Lang Stadium more soccer friendly.

=== Other sports ===
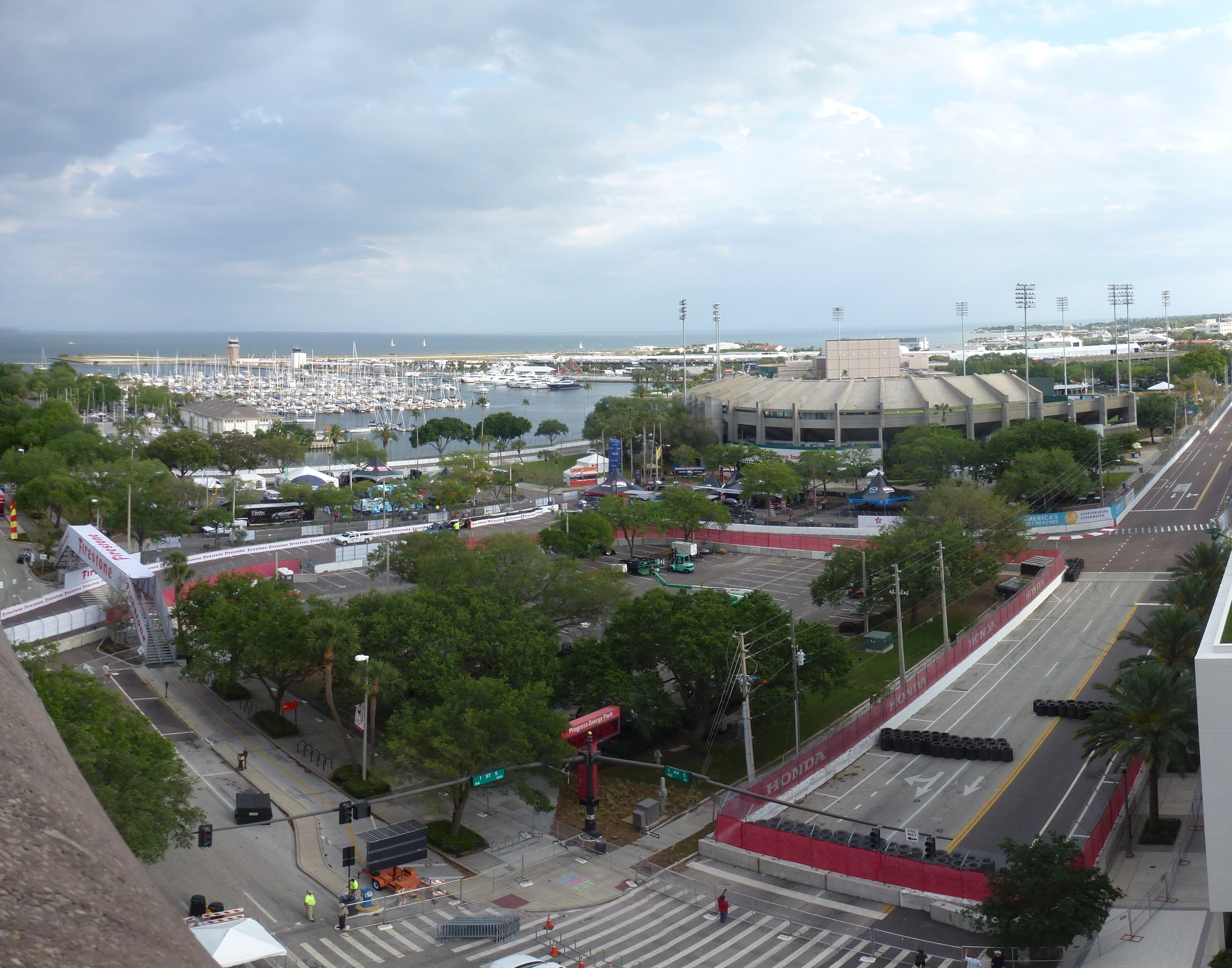
Section of the race course at Al Lang Stadium

Part of the circuit for the Grand Prix of St. Petersburg curves through the parking lot of Al Lang Stadium.

==== Lacrosse ====
On January 29, 2013 Major League Lacrosse announced that the 2012 MLL champions the Rochester Rattlers would face the Chesapeake Bayhawks for their season opener at Al Lang stadium. It would be the first time that the league would play there. Part of this game is an effort to evaluate the Tampa Bay Area, and the state of Florida in general, for an expansion team, after MLL held the All-Star game at FIU Stadium the previous year. It was supported by the St. Petersburg/Clearwater Sports Commission who want to affirm the city's brand as a world-class destination for sports tourism. The game was played on Saturday, April 27, 2013, in front of 3,940 people (a figure higher than half the league's average attendance), with Chesapeake winning, 17–14. The FAU site would eventually become the home of the Florida Launch in 2014 until their eventual demise before the start of the 2019 season. When the original 2019 schedule was released in November 2018, they were expected to move to Central Broward Regional Park in Lauderhill, due to the later season dates overlapping with the Florida Atlantic Owls football season.

==== Rugby ====
In 2015, Al Lang Stadium hosted the Halloween Rugby 7s, a rugby sevens tournament featuring eight teams: USA Falcons, USA Hawks, Canada, Argentina, Denver, New York City, Ohio and Utah.

== Future ==
=== Proposed Rays ballpark ===
In 2006, the Tampa Bay Rays announced plans to move their spring training home to Port Charlotte, about 80 minutes south of St. Petersburg, for the 2009 season. In November 2007, Rays President Matt Silverman introduced a plan to build a $450 million new Rays Ballpark at the Al Lang Stadium site that was to be ready for the 2012 baseball season. The plan failed to garner enough political support to move forward, and it was shelved in June 2008. Subsequently, the Rays began looking at other potential locations, and in May 2009, they announced that they would not seek to build a new facility in downtown St. Petersburg.

=== Soccer specific replacement ===
In 2013, the city of St. Petersburg began the process of creating a master plan for the waterfront area that includes Al Lang Stadium. Some of the proposals suggest replacing the entire stadium and surrounding parking areas with a soccer park complex with a new soccer-specific stadium. Rowdies owner Bill Edwards has stated that "in a perfect world", Al Lang Stadium would be replaced by an 18,000-seat publicly financed soccer stadium.

In March 2016, St. Petersburg mayor Rick Kriseman announced plans to hold a public referendum on extending the Rowdies' lease at Al Lang Stadium and to use tax dollars to help the club transform the facility into a "city showpiece". However, these plans were shelved in May 2016, possibly because it became known that Orlando City SC, the closest Major League Soccer (MLS) franchise, has territorial rights for the Tampa/St. Petersburg market, clouding the prospects for potentially bringing the Rowdies to MLS and delaying the need for a larger venue.

In December 2016, the Tampa Bay Rowdies launched another proposal entitled "#MLS2StPete" to join Major League Soccer as an expansion team. With the announcement, plans were released for an expansion and renovation of Al Lang Stadium to accommodate an 18,000-seat capacity financed by private funding. A May 2017 referendum authorized the city of St. Petersburg to negotiate a 25-year lease with the club if MLS picks the Rowdies as an expansion team.

== See also ==
- Rawhide – a 1938 feature film starring Lou Gehrig, premiered in St. Petersburg by former Mayor Al Lang
- Strategic Air Command – Al Lang Field featured prominently as the setting for the first 10 minutes of the 1955 motion picture starring James Stewart and June Allyson. The facility was the real-life spring training home for the St. Louis Cardinals at the time, and Stewart portrayed Robert "Dutch" Holland, a third baseman for the team who is recalled to active duty with the United States Air Force in the film.
