= St. Petersburg Saints =

- 1908–2000; (1908-1928, 1947-2000); St. Petersburg, Florida

Minor league affiliations
- Previous classes: Class A-Advanced (1990–2000); Class A (1963–1989); Class D (1955–1962); Class B (1947–1954); Class D (1925–1928); Class C (1921–1924); Class D (1920)
- League: Florida State League (1955–2000)
- Previous leagues: Florida International League (1947–1954) Florida State League (1920–1928)

Major league affiliations
- Previous teams: Tampa Bay Devil Rays (1997–2000); St. Louis Cardinals (1966–1996); Los Angeles Dodgers (1962–1965); New York Yankees (1956–1961); Cleveland Indians (1949)

Minor league titles
- League titles: 9 (1922, 1951, 1958, 1959, 1967, 1973, 1975, 1986, 1997)

Team data
- Previous names: St. Petersburg Devil Rays (1997–2000); St. Petersburg Cardinals (1966–1996); St. Petersburg Saints (1920–1928; 1947–1965)
- Previous parks: Al Lang Field (1947–2000); Coffee Pot Park (1920–1928)

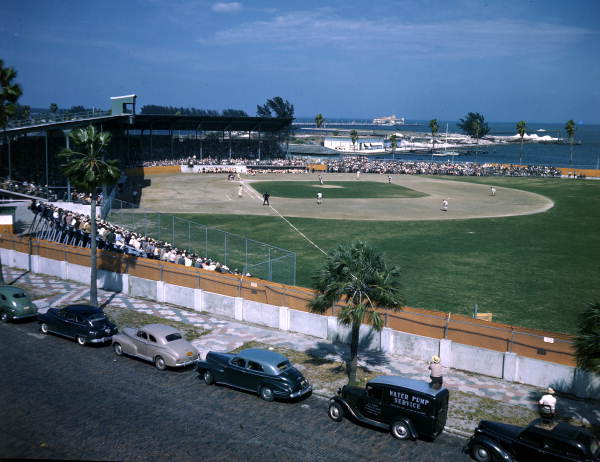
Al Lang Field in St. Petersburg, Florida (ca. 1950)

The St. Petersburg Saints were a minor league baseball team that operated out of St. Petersburg, Florida. The team began as a semi-pro team and as early as October 1908, the semi-pro Saints played the Cincinnati Reds in a post-season exhibition game. By 1914, the Saints were receiving regular coverage in the local press.

St. Petersburg teams played as members of the Florida State League from 1920 to 1928 and then folded operations. A second team, also called the St. Petersburg Saints played in the Florida International League from 1947 to 1954 and the Florida State League from 1955 to 1965. The team won four championships and were owned by R. Vernon and Irene C. Eckert from 1951–1954.

Baseball Hall of Fame members Sparky Anderson (1966) and Jimmie Foxx (1947) managed St. Petersburg minor league teams.

== Affiliations ==
They were affiliated with Cleveland in 1949, the New York Yankees from 1956–1961, and Los Angeles Dodgers from 1962–1965. The team name was changed to the St. Petersburg Cardinals upon their signing an affiliation deal with the St. Louis Cardinals in 1966. They continued as the Cards through 1996, winning four more championships. The team was renamed once more in 1997 as the St. Petersburg Devil Rays (an affiliation deal with the Tampa Bay Devil Rays, now the Tampa Bay Rays) and remained operation until folding for good after the 2000 season when the Devil Rays affiliated with the Advanced Single-A Bakersfield Blaze for the 2001 season.

== Legacy ==
On June 23, 2007, the Tampa Bay Devil Rays wore 1955 St. Petersburg Saints uniforms in a turn back the clock game against the Dodgers. Rays coach Don Zimmer had played on the 1955 World Series champion Brooklyn Dodgers and the Rays honored the 1955 team and Zimmer.

== Notable alumni ==
- Sparky Anderson (1966, MGR) Inducted Baseball Hall of Fame, 2000
- Jimmie Foxx (1947, Player/MGR) Inducted Baseball Hall of Fame, 1951
- Luis Alicea (1990)
- Wilson Alvarez (1998, 2000) MLB All-Star
- Jack Billingham (1962, 1964) MLB All-Star
- Pedro Borbon (1967)
- Miguel Cairo (1996)
- Bill Caudill (1975) MLB All-Star
- Mark Clark (1990)
- Reggie Cleveland (1967)
- Rhéal Cormier (1989)
- José Cruz (1967) 2x MLB All-Star
- Jody Davis (1980) 2x MLB All-Star
- John Denny (1971) 1983 NL Cy Young Award
- Mike Difelice (1992-1993)
- Leon Durham (1977) 2x MLB All Star
- Jeff Fassero (1986)
- Mike Gallego (1996)
- Jim Gott (1980)
- Juan Guzman (2000) MLB All-Star
- Keith Hernandez (1972) 5x MLB All-Star; 1979 NL Most Valuable Player
- Larry Herndon (1973)
- Tom Herr (1976-1977) MLB All-Star
- Ken Hill (1987) MLB All-Star
- Danny Jackson (1996) 2x MLB All-Star
- Lance Johnson (1985) MLB All-Star
- Brian Jordan (1989-1990) MLB All-Star
- Felix Jose (1992) MLB All-Star
- Terry Kennedy (1977) (1993, MGR) 4x MLB All-Star
- Lon Kruger (1974) College basketball coach
- Joe Magrane (1985, 1992) 1988 NL ERA Leader
- Matt Morris (1995) 2 x MLB All-Star
- Willie Montanez (1967) MLB All-Star
- Mike Morgan (1996) MLB All-Star
- Jerry Mumphrey (1972) MLB All-Star
- Ken Oberkfell (1975)
- Terry Pendleton (1982) MLB All-Star; 1991 NL Batting Title; 1991 NL Most Valuable Player
- Placido Polanco (1996) 2x MLB All-Star
- Chris Sabo (1993) 3x MLB All-Star; 1988 NL Rookie of the Year
- Tom Tresh (1958) 3x MLB All-Star; 1962 AL Rookie of the Year
- Garry Templeton (1974-1975) 3x MLB All-Star
- Jose Uribe (1981)
- Andy Van Slyke (1981) MLB All-Star
- Todd Worrell (1984) 3x MLB All-Star; 1986 NL Rookie of the Year
- Esteban Yan (1999)
- Dmitri Young (1993) 2x MLB All-Star
