= Clearwater Athletic Field =

Stadium in Clearwater, Florida

- Interactive map of Clearwater Athletic Field
- Former names: Brooklyn Field
- Location: Pennsylvania Ave and Seminole St, Clearwater, Florida
- Coordinates: 27.973680°N 82.792890°W
- Owner: City of Clearwater
- Capacity: 3,100 (1951-1954)
- Surface: grass
- Field size: Left – 340 ft. Center – ft. Right – 290 ft.

Construction
- Groundbreaking: December 1922
- Opened: March 15, 1923
- Closed: 1954
- Demolished: 1956
- Cost: $25,000

Tenants
- Brooklyn Dodgers (MLB) (spring training) (1923–1932; 1936–1941); Clearwater Pelicans (FSL) (1924); Newark Bears (IL) (spring training) (1933–1935); Cleveland Indians (MLB) (spring training) (1942 and 1946); Clearwater Bombers (ASA) (1945–1954); Philadelphia Phillies (MLB) (spring training) (1947–1954); Clearwater Black Sox (FSNBL) (1952)

Clearwater Athletic Field was a stadium in Clearwater, Florida. It was first used by professional baseball teams for spring training in 1923 and was the Phillies' first spring training ballpark in Clearwater. The grandstand sat approximately 2,000 and bleachers increased capacity to close to 3,000. Home plate was located on Pennsylvania Avenue, which ran south to north along the third base line, near Seminole Street. Left field ran parallel to Palmetto Street, and right field ran parallel to Greenwood Ave. The grandstand was destroyed by fire in April 1956.

The North Greenwood Recreation and Aquatic Complex now stands on the site of ballpark. On March 19, 2016, the site of the ballpark was recognized as a Florida Heritage Site and the location added to the state's heritage map.

== History ==
In October 1922, the Brooklyn Dodgers agreed to train in Clearwater in 1923 provided the city would clear a field and construct grandstands. The Clearwater city council voted to issue $25,000 in bonds for construction. The Dodgers' move to Florida brought the number of major league clubs conducting spring training in the state to seven. The first game was played on March 15, 1923 between the Dodgers and the Boston Braves, who trained in St. Petersburg. The game was preceded by a parade to the park and Commissioner Kenesaw Mountain Landis threw out the first pitch to Clearwater mayor Frank J. Booth. More than 4,000 fans saw the Dodgers defeat the Braves 12-7.

It was the spring training home of the Brooklyn Dodgers, Newark Bears (when the top minor league baseball teams held their own spring training), Cleveland, and the Philadelphia Phillies. The Florida State League's Clearwater Pelicans and the Amateur Softball Association national-champion Clearwater Bombers played their home games at Athletic Field. The Florida State Negro Baseball League Clearwater Black Sox played at the park in 1952.

== Phillies in Clearwater ==
Cleveland trained in Clearwater in 1942 and 1946. The franchise was sold in June 1946 to Bill Veeck and a note soon appeared in the Sporting News that the team was considering a spring training move to Tucson, Arizona for 1947. Paul Ficht, secretary of the Clearwater Chamber of Commerce, along with Mayor J.C. House, and City Manager F.L. Hendrix spoke with the St. Louis Browns, Newark Bears, Kansas City Blues, and Phillies about training in Clearwater in 1947. On July 27, 1946, Hendrix announced that the Phillies had accepted Clearwater's invitation to train at Athletic Field in 1947 on a one-year agreement. On March 7, 1947, the Phillies and city signed a 10-year deal for the Phillies to train in Clearwater.

The Phillies lost their first spring training game in 1947 at Athletic Field to the Detroit Tigers by a score of 13-1. The Phillies' attendance that spring was 13,291 which was ninth out of the ten teams training in Florida.

Prior to the 1951 spring training season, an electric scoreboard was erected in right field and the stands were expanded, bringing capacity to 3,100. One of the largest crowds for a spring training game was on March 24, 1951, when the Phillies drew 3,851 against the Boston Red Sox.

Phillies and City of Clearwater officials began meeting in 1952 to plan for a ballpark to replace Athletic Field.

== After 1955 ==
It was replaced in 1955 by Jack Russell Stadium, into which both the Phillies and Bombers moved after the 1954 season. Even after moving into Jack Russell in 1955, the Phillies continued to practice at the field.

Fire destroyed the grandstand in 1956 but the field remained in use. The Baltimore Orioles team in the Winter Instructional League trained at Athletic Field in October 1959 and played their home games next door at Jack Russell Stadium.

At the time of the fire which destroyed the grandstands on April 12, 1956, it was reported that city managers planned to tear down the grandstands in 1957 and replace them with temporary bleachers. Ray Green Field was also used for parking for games at Jack Russell Stadium.

The North Greenwood Recreation and Aquatic Complex now stands on the site of the ballpark. In 2003, the city opened the Ray E. Green Aquatic Center, named in honor of the mayor.

In February 2018, football team D.C. United trained in Clearwater and used the grass fields at Walter C. Campbell Park between the recreation center and Jack Russell Memorial Stadium.

== Name ==
The ballpark is often identified as "Clearwater Athletic Field" or "Clearwater's Athletic Field". It was renamed Ray Green Field in honor of Ray Green, mayor of Clearwater from 1935 to 1938, who was instrumental in upgrading the facility during his tenure as mayor. In a 1980 interview, Eddie Moore, director of Clearwater parks and recreation from 1938 to 1978, recalled that the ballpark was called "Brooklyn Field" during the Dodgers' tenure. A 1939 news article recounts the Clearwater Senior Softball League playing at "Brooklyn field".
