= Ybor City Museum State Park =

Local history museum in Tampa, Florida

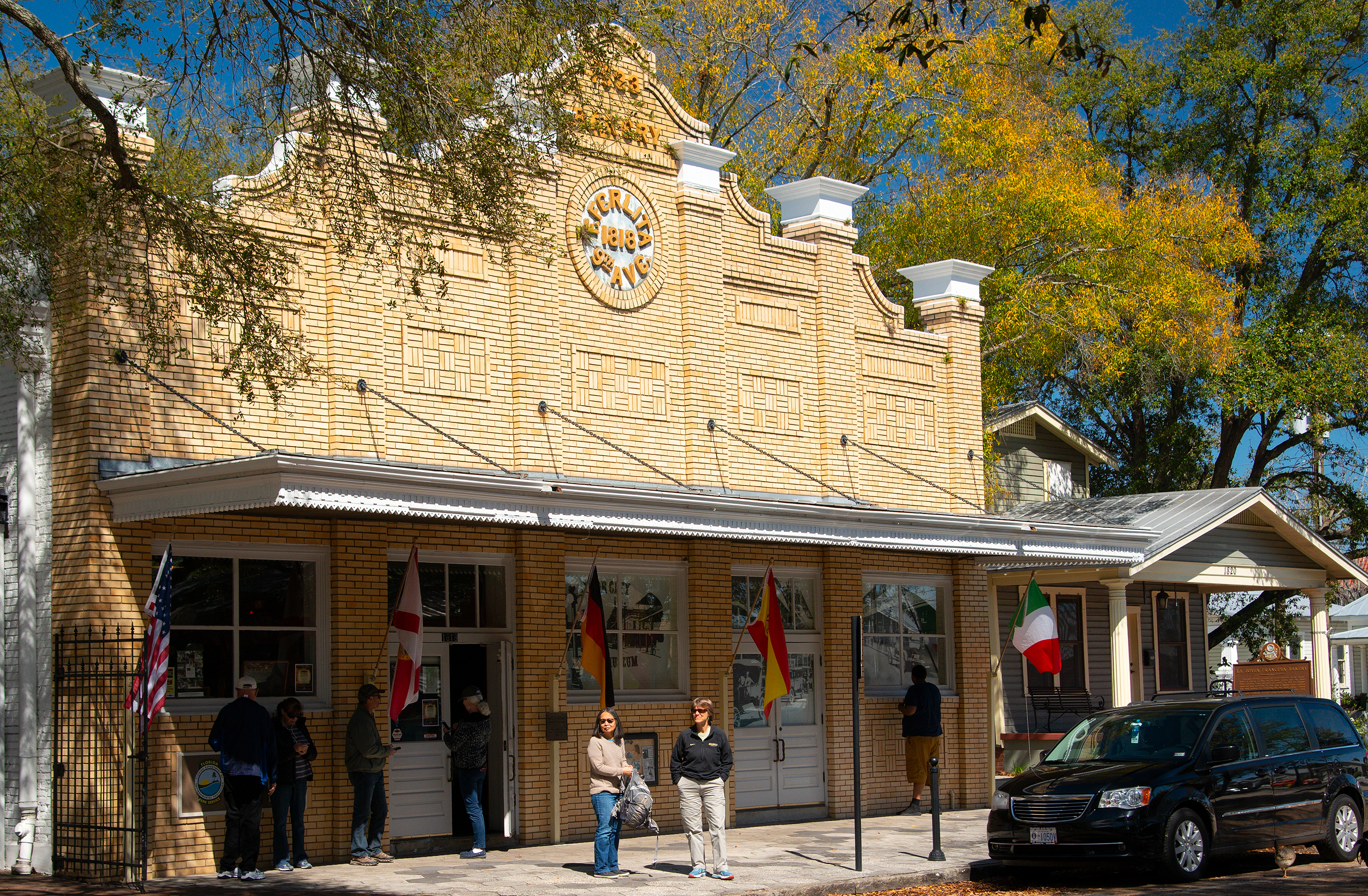
- Front of the museum

- Location within Florida Location within the United States
- Interactive map of Ybor City Museum State Park
- Location: Hillsborough County, Florida, USA
- Nearest city: Tampa, Florida
- Coordinates: 27.96218153167179°N 82.43872214731267°W
- Area: less than one acre
- Governing body: National Park Service / Florida Department of Environmental Protection

Ybor City Museum State Park is a Florida State Park in Tampa, Florida's Ybor City. The museum occupies the former Ferlita Bakery (originally La Joven Francesca) building at 1818 9th Avenue in the Ybor City Historic District. The bakery was known for producing Cuban bread and its ovens are part of the museum displays covering the history of the cigar industry and the Latin community from the 1880s through the 1930s. There is also an ornamental garden in the building (available for rental after regular hours).

Tours of the gardens and the "casitas" (small homes of cigar company workers) are provided by a ranger. Exhibits, period photos and a video cover the founding of Ybor City and the cigar making industry.

== History ==
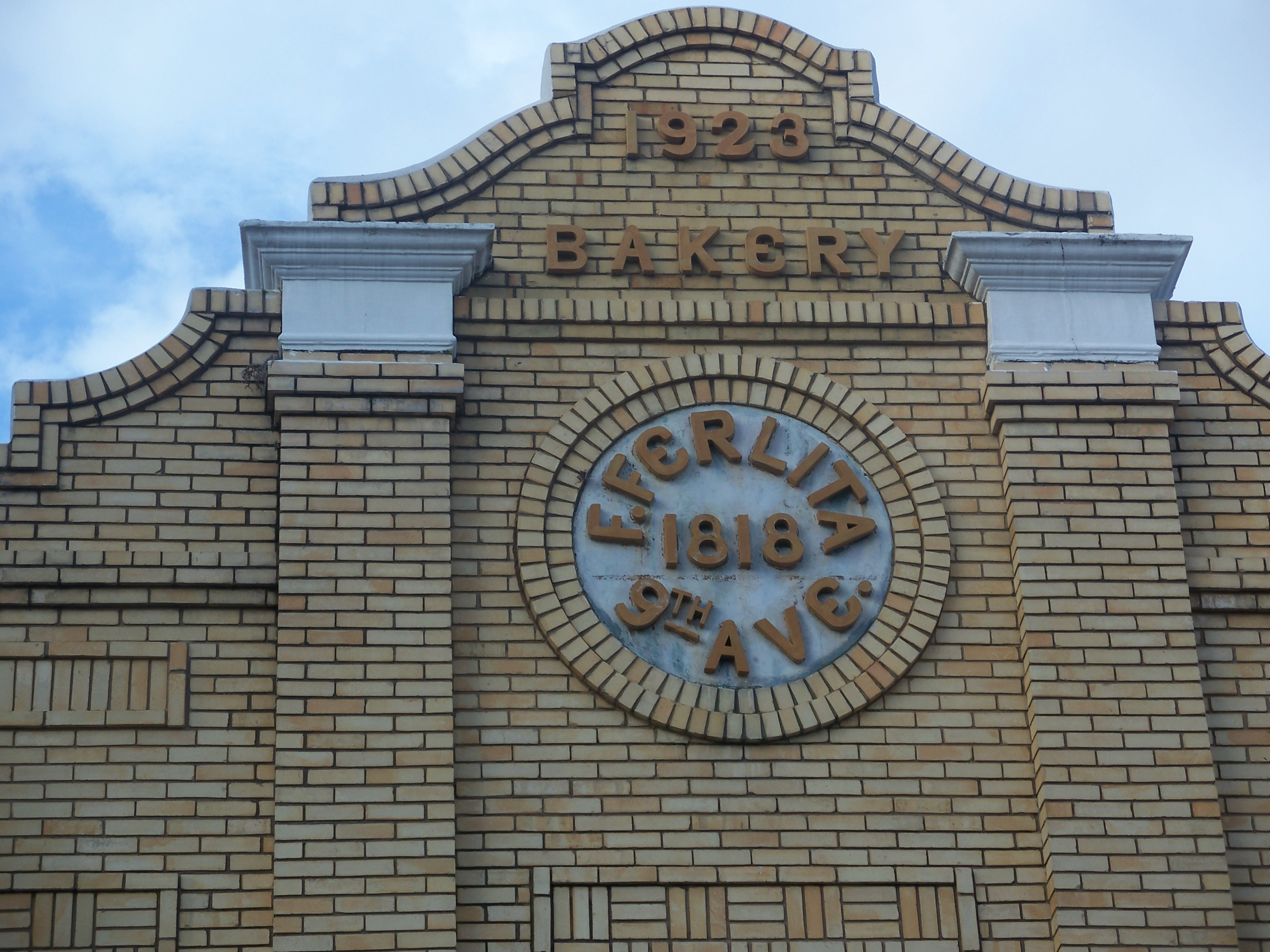
A detail of the museum's building

The Museum is housed on the site of what is likely the earliest U.S. bakery to produce Cuban bread, La Joven Francesca bakery. Established in 1896 by the Sicilian-born Francisco Ferlita, of Cuban-Spanish-Italian descent, bread sold for 3 to 5 cents a loaf, mainly to the Ybor City market.

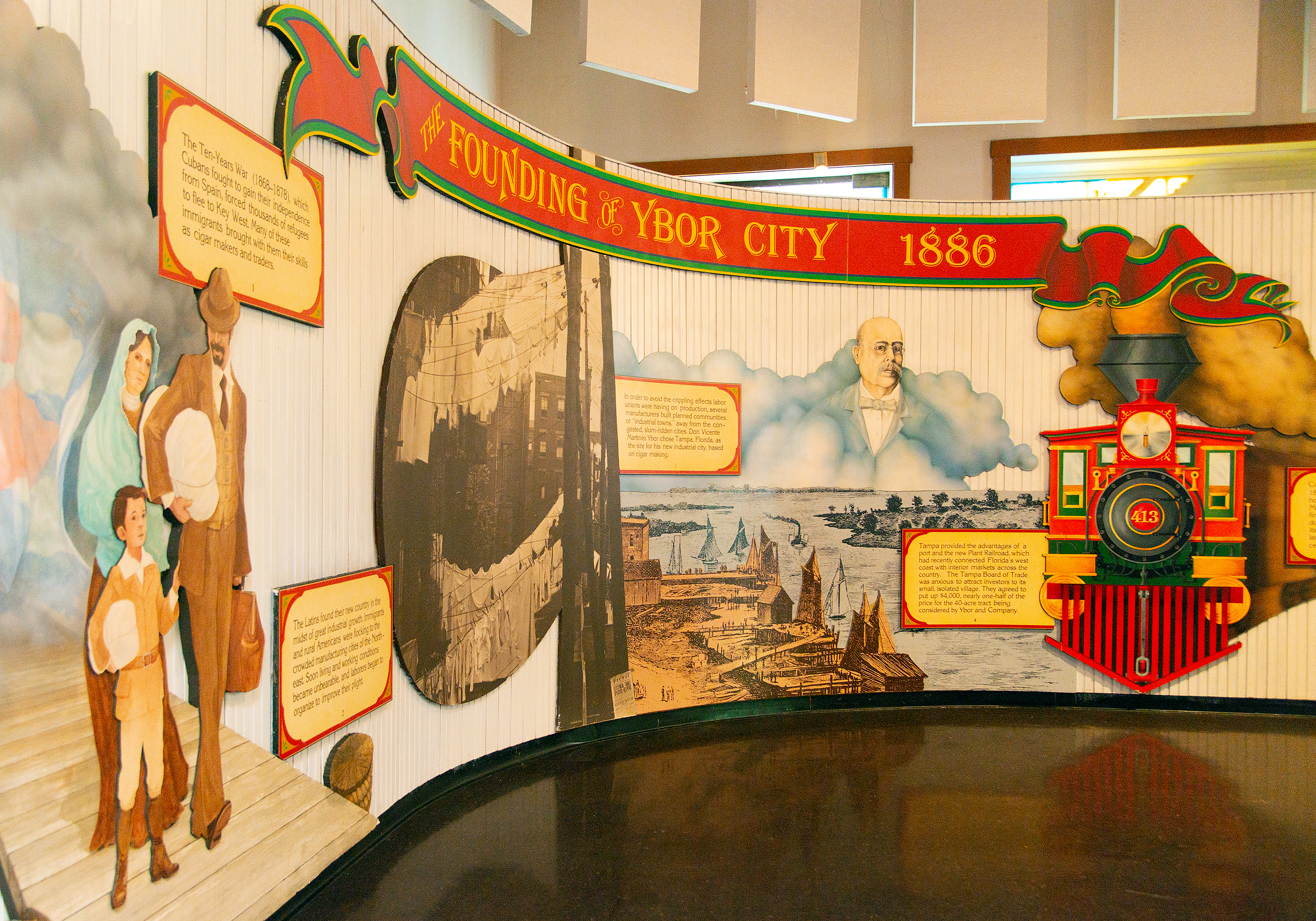
Historic display at the museum

The bakery was destroyed by a fire in 1922, leaving only the brick bread oven standing. However, Francisco rebuilt the bakery even larger than before and added a second oven, turning it into a major supplier of bread for the Tampa/Ybor area. The bakery itself became a place to congregate, offering coffee and snacks. till the building was converted into a museum in 1973.

In Ybor City, bread (like milk) used to be delivered every morning. Houses had a sturdy nail driven into the doorframe next to the door on which deliveryman would impale the fresh loaf of bread. La Joven closed in 1973 and was renovated and converted shortly after into a main part of the museum complex at the Ybor City State Museum. The original ovens where the original Cuban bread was baked are still viewable inside.

La Segunda Bakery ('The Second' as La Primera, 'The First', burned down long ago) is currently the major producer of Cuban Bread for the Tampa area. It was founded by Juan Morè, and opened La Primera Bakery in 1915.
