= Expansion of Major League Baseball =

Major League Baseball (MLB), the highest level of professional baseball in the United States and Canada, has undergone several rounds of expansion beginning in 1961, eventually reaching 30 teams with its most recent expansion taking place in 1998. MLB has discussed preparations for another round of expansion. Several investment groups are vying for an MLB franchise.

Progression of MLB expansion
Years	No. of AL teams	No. of NL teams	Total
1901–1960	8	8	16
1961	10	8	18
1962–1968	10	10	20
1969–1976	12	12	24
1977–1992	14	12	26
1993–1997	14	14	28
1998–2012	14	16	30
2013–present	15	15	30

== Background ==
Locations of teams for the 1955–1960 American League seasons
American League
Locations of teams for the 1960–1961 National League seasons
National League

From 1903 to 1952, MLB's 16-team structure, split into the American League (AL) and National Leagues (NL), remained intact. No franchises moved during this period. Five markets—Boston, Chicago, New York City, Philadelphia, and St. Louis—had two or more teams. According to authors Andy McCue and Eric Thompson, "The less financially successful clubs in two-team cities were finding it increasingly difficult to compete" by the early 1950s. The U.S. population was shifting as well, with many people moving from the Northeast, where many MLB teams were based, to southern and western locations.

From 1953 to 1955, three franchises moved, all from markets with two or more teams. Before the 1958 season, the two New York City teams in the NL moved westward: the Brooklyn Dodgers to Los Angeles and the New York Giants to San Francisco.

=== MLB's perceived threat of proposed Continental League ===
After the Dodgers and Giants moved, a third major league of baseball, the Continental League, was proposed by lawyer William Shea in November 1958. The new league was formally announced on July 27, 1959, with teams in Denver, Houston, Minneapolis–St. Paul, New York City, and Toronto. In January 1960, the league announced plans to add Atlanta, Dallas–Fort Worth, and Buffalo for the 1961 season.

MLB was also facing pressure from the U.S. Congress, which indicated that efforts to prevent future expansion would arouse interest in weakening the sport's exemption from antitrust laws. Congress voted on a bill aimed at repealing the exemption, but it failed.

MLB moved to expand after a rival league became a possibility. It formed an expansion committee, which voted to add four teams, two in each league, by 1961–62. MLB sought cities that had received interest from the Continental League as a means to stop its formal start. Among them were Houston, Los Angeles, New York City, and Washington, D.C, which were all granted franchises by late 1960. As a concession by Shea, part of his negotiations with MLB to expand to incorporate at least eight new teams, the Continental League formally disbanded on August 2, 1960.

== 1961 AL expansion ==
Locations of teams for the 1961 American League season
American League

=== Los Angeles Angels ===
Actor Gene Autry led a group that paid $2.1 million for the right to place an MLB team in Los Angeles. Autry, who owned radio stations, had been seeking to acquire a contract to broadcast baseball games when he traveled to MLB's Winter Meetings. After the Meetings, on December 6, 1960, his group received franchise rights. The Los Angeles team was initially scheduled to begin play in 1962, but a plan to move another AL team advanced the start date to 1961. The club was named the Los Angeles Angels, after a Pacific Coast League team that had previously played in the city. To secure the name rights, Autry paid a $350,000 fee to Dodgers owner Walter O'Malley, who had purchased the minor league Angels before moving the Dodgers to Los Angeles.

=== Washington Senators ===
Leading figures in Minneapolis–St. Paul, Minnesota, had sought an expansion franchise. In October 1960, the AL permitted the Washington Senators to move in time for the 1961 season and gave Washington, D.C., an expansion team. The former Senators changed their name to the Minnesota Twins, and the new expansion team took the Senators name. The decision was partially in response to pressure from Congress, which had wanted a replacement for the former Senators. As with the Angels' ownership group, the new Senators' owners paid a $2.1 million fee for the right to an MLB franchise. In 1972, the new Washington Senators team moved to the Dallas–Fort Worth metroplex as the Texas Rangers.

== 1962 NL expansion ==
Locations of teams for the 1962–1963 National League seasons
National League

The NL announced an expansion as the 1960 World Series was in progress, with new teams in Houston and New York City. William Shea had been a supporter of the Continental League concept, and had attracted several investors. A potential Houston team also had numerous partners, many of whom had oil interests. The AL initially showed interest in adding a Houston team, but the investors wanted an NL franchise. MLB granted the two cities franchises on October 17, 1960.

=== Houston Colt .45s ===
The Houston Sports Association was formed in 1957 and bought a minor league baseball team four years later. The group was given a controlling interest in Houston's expansion team, which was named the Houston Colt .45s. It played at Colt Stadium. It would only be a few years later in 1965 that the team would become the Houston Astros. In 2013, the Astros transferred to the American League.

=== New York Mets ===
Following the announcement of the Dodgers and Giants leaving New York City, the city formed the Mayor's Committee, headed by lawyer William Shea. Though New York City sought a replacement NL franchise (strongly supported by city Mayor Robert Wagner), MLB displayed little intention of adding a New York team, despite the formation of the Expansion Committee. With Shea's Continental League project and pressure from Congress, MLB eventually gave in and rewarded New York with a National League franchise, effectively killing the Continental League project. On May 8, 1961, the club announced the name of the team would be the New York Mets, named after a shortened version of the 1880s team, the New York Metropolitans.

The city was unable to secure funding for a proposed Flushing Meadows stadium in time for play in 1962, so the Mets played at the Polo Grounds, the previous home of the New York Giants. George Weiss was the president of the team, and seven-time World Series championship-winning manager Casey Stengel was hired to lead the Mets on the field. Thanks to Shea's efforts to bring National League baseball back to New York, Shea Stadium, the stadium the Mets would play in from 1964 to 2008, was named in his honor.

== 1969 expansion ==
Locations of teams for the 1969 American League season
West East

=== AL expansion ===
==== Kansas City Royals ====
Following the departure of the Kansas City Athletics to Oakland following the end of the 1967 season, US Senator Stuart Symington threatened to challenge Major League Baseball's antitrust exemption with federal legislation, and to also challenge the reserve clause. Kansas City mayor Ilus Davis threatened a lawsuit to block the move. Tom Yawkey arranged a meeting of the owners during a convention, during which the league agreed to accelerate the expansion process and assured that Kansas City would be granted a new franchise to begin play no later than the 1969 season. This would require another franchise to be established at the same time to ensure the league had an even number of teams for a balanced schedule. Ewing Kauffman won rights to the franchise and paid a $5.5 million expansion fee for the Kansas City Royals, which played games at Municipal Stadium until the end of the 1972 season, after which the team moved to Royals Stadium, now known as Kauffman Stadium.

==== Seattle Pilots ====
Because of failed attempts to attract existing teams, Seattle instead tried to lobby for an expansion franchise at the 1967 owners' meetings in Chicago. The delegation also had support from two US Senators, Henry M. Jackson and Warren Magnuson, the latter of whom was the chairman of the Senate Commerce Committee, a committee which has "jurisdiction over the major league's business activities". Coupled with Symington's threats related to the move of the Kansas City Athletics, the political influence swayed the American League owners. However, they were reluctant to expand in 1969 without a Seattle stadium bond issue. The Seattle delegation assured the owners that Sick's Stadium could be renovated in five months to fulfill the minimum requirements until a new stadium was built; with this, the owners agreed to a 1969 expansion, and approved teams in Kansas City and Seattle.

In December 1967 at the Winter Meetings in Mexico City, the franchise was officially awarded to Pacific Northwest Sports, led by Dewey Soriano, which received $5.5 million in funding from William R. Daley, who thus had 47% ownership of the venture. Other owners included Max and Dewey Soriano. The award was contingent on renovation of Sick's Stadium to increase its seating capacity from 11,000 to 30,000 by the start of the 1969 season. The Sorianos persuaded notable athletes to advocate for the $40 million King County stadium bond issue, including baseball players Mickey Mantle, Carl Yastrzemski, and Joe DiMaggio, and football player Y. A. Tittle; the bond issue was approved by 62.3% of the electorate. The Seattle Pilots would eventually be declared bankrupt in 1970 and the team was sold to Bud Selig, who moved the team to Milwaukee after only one season in Seattle and renamed it as the present-day Milwaukee Brewers. The team would eventually transfer to the National League in 1998 as a result of expansion that season.

=== NL expansion ===
Locations of teams for the 1969 National League season
West East

==== Montreal Expos ====
Montreal City Councilor Gerry Snyder spoke to Ford C. Frick sometime after the 1962 Major League Baseball expansion, during which he was told Montreal would not receive an expansion franchise unless it had a stadium in which to contest matches. At the Winter Meetings in Mexico City on December 2, 1967, Snyder presented a proposal to Major League Baseball owners to establish a franchise in the city. Several influential owners pledged their support for a Montreal franchise in that meeting, including Walter O'Malley, Roy Hofheinz, and John Galbreath. Certain that Hofheinz would object to a Dallas–Fort Worth bid and that the San Diego bid was near certain to be successful, Snyder deemed a bid from Buffalo to be the strongest bid against which to compete.

On May 27, 1968, the National League officially awarded a franchise to Montreal to commence play in the 1969 season. National League president Warren Giles had encouraged the owners during the meeting, stating "If we're going to expand, let's really spread it out". The Montreal Expos became the first franchise to be awarded to a city outside the United States. When the news reached the U.S. Congress, members collectively condemned the decision.

Because of the slow pace of progress in meeting commitments, Jean-Louis Lévesque withdrew his financial support in the franchise on July 31, 1968. Snyder quickly found another investor, Charles Bronfman, and the team met the deadline of 15 August for the initial $1.1 million installment, before which Jarry Park was selected as the team's stadium for the short term. Renovations to the park were made by adding uncovered bleacher seats along the right and left field lines, and an electronic scoreboard installed beyond right field. The team had some issues committing to a new stadium, as required by the franchise award, and it was said that the team had agreed to build a dome at the Autostade and use it as their stadium if a new stadium was not built by 1970. It had originally intended to lease the stadium and expand its seating capacity from 26,000 to 37,000, but then chose Jarry Park instead.

The ownership group paid $12.5 million for the team. John McHale was hired as the team's first president, and Jim Fanning its first general manager. Many names had been considered for the team, including Royals which had a strong association with the city, but the name had already been adopted by the new Kansas City franchise. After rejecting various options, including "Voyageurs" and "Nationals", the name Expos was chosen in honour of Expo 67 and because it was the same in both of the city's official languages. McHale stated that the name would "help Montreal be identified properly as the city that gave the world Expo 67".

The Montreal Expos would eventually move to Washington, D.C. for the 2005 season as the Washington Nationals.

==== San Diego Padres ====
In 1967, C. Arnholt Smith, owner of the San Diego Padres of the Pacific Coast League (PCL), won a bid for an expansion team in the National League for the 1969 season. On May 27, 1968, the National League officially awarded a franchise to San Diego to commence play in the 1969 season for a fee of $12.5 million for the team. After the 1968 PCL season, Smith surrendered the PCL franchise, which moved to Eugene, Oregon, and transferred the Padre name to his new NL team, the San Diego Padres. Eddie Leishman was named general manager of the MLB Padres, with club president and minority investor Buzzie Bavasi, formerly GM of the Los Angeles Dodgers (having resigned to take the new role), playing a dominant role in its baseball operations as president of the team.

== 1977 AL expansion ==
Locations of teams for the 1977–1981 American League seasons
West East

=== Seattle Mariners ===
Following the bankruptcy and departure of the Seattle Pilots on April 1, 1970, the city of Seattle, King County, and the state of Washington sued the American League for breach of contract. The $32.5 million lawsuit proceeded until 1976, when at trial the American League offered the city a franchise in exchange for the city, county, and state to drop the suit. On November 2, 1972, King County broke ground on the Kingdome, which would come to be used by the Seattle Mariners for baseball and by the Seahawks for football.

On January 15, 1976, the expansion franchise was approved, becoming the 13th franchise in the American League. It was owned by Lester Smith and Danny Kaye, who paid an expansion fee of US$6.5 million. Owing to the history surrounding the franchise, sportswriter Emmett Watson of the Seattle Post-Intelligencer joked that the team should be named the Seattle Litigants.

=== Toronto Blue Jays ===
Toronto had previously been involved with the failed Continental League. In 1974, the Toronto City Council approved a further CA$2.8 million for renovations to Exhibition Stadium, retrofitting the stadium for baseball and would be ready in time for the 1977 season. There had been strong interest from several groups and individuals to own a Major League Baseball team in the city. The most prominent was Labatt Brewing Company, who wanted to use ownership of a sports team to establish a visible presence in the Toronto market. Labatt Brewing Company would fail to buy and move the Baltimore Orioles and the Cleveland Indians to Toronto. Soon after in February 1976, the Labatt Brewing Company would again fail to acquire and move a third team, this time the San Francisco Giants. Following this failure, Toronto City Council alderman Paul Godfrey received a phone call from Kansas City Royals owner Ewing Kauffman informing him that he supported a Toronto franchise for the American League.

During an owners meeting held on March 20, 1976, the American League franchises voted 11–1 to expand the league with a Toronto franchise, to which National League owners resolved to consider a Toronto franchise to begin play in the 1977 season. Bowie Kuhn, at the time the Commissioner of Baseball, planned for the National League to expand with new franchises in Toronto and Washington, D.C., and for the American League to add a new franchise in New Orleans in addition to the already-awarded Seattle franchise. On March 29, National League owners met and voted in favour of the expansion plans, but they were rejected because the vote was not unanimous, with dissenting votes from the owners of the Cincinnati Reds and Philadelphia Phillies. A subsequent vote on April 26 ended this plan with a 7–5 result in favour of the proposal, again failing to achieve unanimity.

Two groups bid for the rights to franchise ownership in the city, which presented bids during an American League owner's meeting on March 26, 1976. Ultimately, an ownership group named Metro Baseball Ltd. consisting of Labatt Brewing Company, the Canadian Imperial Bank of Commerce, and Imperial Trust won the bid for a franchise fee of CA$7 million. The other bid was made by Atlantic Packaging. The winning bid was represented by legal counsel Herb Solway and Gord Kirke. Kirke prepared the original documents which led to the foundation of the team in 1976, named the Toronto Blue Jays.

== 1993 NL expansion ==
Locations of teams for the 1993 National League season
West East

In June 1991, the MLB expansion committee accepted the bids of the Miami and Denver groups to debut in 1993. Expansion was approved unanimously by all teams in July 1991.

=== Colorado Rockies ===
Denver, Colorado had previously been involved with the failed Continental League. After previous failed attempts to bring Major League Baseball to the state of Colorado (most notably the Pittsburgh Pirates nearly moving to Denver following the Pittsburgh drug trials in 1985), by the late 1980s a team seemed to be a possibility in Denver. Eugene Orza, associate general counsel of the Major League Baseball Players Association, stated that he expected Denver would receive one of the expansion franchises.

The Colorado Baseball Commission, led by banking executive Larry Varnell, was successful in getting Denver voters to approve a 0.1% sales tax to help finance a new baseball stadium. Also, an advisory committee was formed in 1990 by then-Governor of Colorado Roy Romer to recruit an ownership group. The group selected was led by John Antonucci, an Ohio beverage distributor, and Michael I. Monus, the head of the Phar-Mor drugstore chain. Local and regional companies—such as Erie Lake, Hensel Phelps Construction, KOA Radio, and the Rocky Mountain News—rounded out the group. The Denver group chose to call their franchise the Colorado Rockies, the same name used as the National Hockey League franchise that played in Denver from 1976 to 1982.

=== Florida Marlins ===
U.S. Senator Connie Mack III from Florida, the grandson of baseball great Connie Mack and a member of the Senate Task Force on Major League Baseball, pushed Baseball Commissioner Fay Vincent to expand to Florida.

On June 10, 1990, Wayne Huizenga, CEO of Blockbuster Entertainment Corporation, was awarded an expansion franchise in the National League (NL) for a $95 million expansion fee and the team began operations in 1993 as the Florida Marlins, beating out bids in Orlando and Tampa Bay. Orlando fielded a very spirited campaign bolstered by its family-oriented tourism industry. Tampa Bay already had a baseball park — the Florida Suncoast Dome in St. Petersburg, completed in 1990. The Miami group chose to call themselves the "Florida" Marlins to broaden their fanbase to the entire state, while reviving the nickname "Marlins" from previous minor league teams, the Miami Marlins of the International League from 1956 to 1960, and the Miami Marlins (1962–1970) and Miami Marlins (1982–1988) teams that played in the Florida State League.

With the enfranchisement of a team in the Tampa Bay area and a new stadium in Miami proper, the Florida Marlins would rename as the Miami Marlins in 2012.

== 1998 expansion ==
Locations of teams for the 1998–1999 National League seasons
West Central East

=== Arizona Diamondbacks ===
In the fall of 1993, Jerry Colangelo, majority owner of the Phoenix Suns, the area's NBA franchise, announced he was assembling an ownership group, "Arizona Baseball, Inc.", to apply for a Major League Baseball expansion team. This was a local group formed to preserve Cactus League spring training in Arizona and eventually secure a Major League franchise for the state.

Colangelo's group was so certain that they would be awarded a franchise that they held a name-the-team contest for it, with the final choice being "Diamondbacks", after the Western diamondback, a rattlesnake native to the region known for injecting a large amount of venom when it strikes.

Colangelo's bid received strong support from one of his friends, Chicago White Sox and Chicago Bulls owner Jerry Reinsdorf, and media reports say that then-acting Commissioner of Baseball and Milwaukee Brewers founder Bud Selig was also a strong supporter of Colangelo's bid. Plans were also made for a new retractable-roof ballpark, to be built in an industrial/warehouse district on the southeast edge of downtown Phoenix, one block from the Suns' America West Arena. On March 9, 1995, Colangelo's group was awarded a franchise to begin play for the 1998 season. A $130 million franchise fee was paid to Major League Baseball in four payments, over the course of three years. In addition, the Diamondbacks gave away their rights to $5 million from baseball's central fund for each of the five years following expansion (1998–2002).

Arizona had originally been intended to join Tampa Bay in the American League. However, five American League teams had threatened to block the league assignments because of concerns that they would have additional games out of their time zone, causing early starts that would decrease revenue and TV ratings. Thus, on January 16, 1997, the Arizona Diamondbacks were officially voted into the National League while their expansion counterparts in Tampa Bay were voted into the American League.

=== Tampa Bay Devil Rays ===
Locations of teams for the 1998 American League season
West Central East

After failing to land an expansion team for the 1993 season, the Tampa Bay Baseball Group, the group leading the Tampa Bay area for an expansion team, sued MLB for allegedly reneging on an agreement to grant an expansion team to Tampa.

Like Phoenix, Arizona, on March 9, 1995, Tampa Bay Baseball Group was awarded a franchise to begin play for the 1998 season, and paid an identical $130 million franchise fee that was paid to Major League Baseball in four payments, over the course of three years. Similarly, the Tampa Bay Devil Rays gave away their rights to $5 million from baseball's central fund for each of the five years following expansion (1998–2002).

The suit that was launched in response to the failed 1993 expansion was settled in 2003, five years after the Devil Rays began play in the American League. In 2008, the team would rebrand to their current name, the Tampa Bay Rays.

== United League ==
Echoing the ambitions of the Continental League in 1958, a third league for professional baseball in North America, the United League, was proposed in 1994 by John Bryant, Curt Flood, Richard Moss, Bob Mrazek, Mike Stone, and Andrew Zimbalist as a competitor to the American and National leagues. The United League was planning to implement a total of 10 teams, with eight located in the United States, one in Canada, and one in Mexico. The league aimed to compete with the established, traditional baseball markets in New York, Los Angeles, and New England, in addition to establishing new markets in non-MLB cities. Specific locations that were announced as franchises in 1995 were Long Island (named the New York Kongs); Los Angeles (named the Los Angeles Blaze); Kissimmee, Florida (Orlando); San Juan, Puerto Rico; Washington D.C.; New Orleans; Portland, Oregon; and Vancouver. Other locations that were identified as targets for future franchises included Worcester, Massachusetts; Bridgeport, Connecticut; and Austin, Texas. Long-term ambitions included expansion overseas to Japan and South Korea by 1998.

Following the establishment of franchises, the league announced a 20-year TV deal with Liberty Sports and a 154-game schedule to begin March 28, 1996. In late 1995, the league postponed to a starting date in 1997; however the league announced on April 12, 1996, that it had ceased operations, citing issues with stadiums and the TV contract. Liberty Sports was going through a merger with Fox Television at the time, and would eventually secure their own broadcast deal with MLB in 1997.

Of the proposed United League cities, only Washington, D.C., would ultimately obtain a professional baseball team, when the Montreal Expos moved to become the Washington Nationals. San Juan would eventually also host Montreal Expos games at Hiram Bithorn Stadium during the 2003 and 2004 seasons.

== Expansion drafts ==
There have been six expansion drafts in MLB history.

Year	New teams	Team(s)	Total teams after draft
1960	2	Los Angeles Angels, Washington Senators (now Texas Rangers)	18
1961	2	Houston Colt .45s (now Houston Astros), New York Mets	20
1968	4	Kansas City Royals, Montreal Expos (now Washington Nationals), San Diego Padres, Seattle Pilots (now Milwaukee Brewers)	24
1976	2	Seattle Mariners, Toronto Blue Jays	26
1992	2	Colorado Rockies, Florida Marlins (now Miami Marlins)	28
1997	2	Arizona Diamondbacks, Tampa Bay Devil Rays (now Tampa Bay Rays)	30

== Potential expansion ==
Locations of AL teams for the 2026–present MLB seasons
West Central East
Locations of NL teams for the 2017–present MLB seasons
West Central East
Locations of potential expansion sites
Locations of existing teams
Location of future relocation (Las Vegas Athletics)

After the 2017 season, Tracy Ringolsby of Baseball America wrote that there was "a building consensus" that MLB would expand to 32 teams. He said that the proposed expansion would allow for divisional realignment to address concerns with travel and off-days in the schedule. Ringolsby also reported that a team would likely go to Portland, Oregon, as Commissioner Rob Manfred had said the league needed another team in the western United States.

After Sportico estimated the average value of an MLB franchise to be $2.2 billion in April 2021, Manfred called it a "lodestar" for negotiations for an expansion fee for the team's new owners. Tony Clark, the executive director of the MLB Players Association, voiced his support for expanding MLB to 32 teams the following year.

In April 2023, the Athletics entered into an agreement to move to Las Vegas. The city had been seeking an MLB franchise, either an existing one or a new expansion team. In April 2024, the Athletics announced they had entered into an agreement with Sacramento River Cats owner Vivek Ranadive to play the 2025–2027 seasons at their home stadium, Sutter Health Park in West Sacramento, California, until a new stadium in Las Vegas is completed.

On September 19, 2023, the Rays announced plans to build a ballpark in St. Petersburg next to Tropicana Field, as part of the redevelopment of the Gas Plant District, which was planned to open for the 2028 season. It was expected to be a 30,000-seat fixed-roof stadium which would have cost $1.3 billion. By July 2024, the Rays' new ballpark was approved by the Pinellas County Commission in a 5–2 vote which would have ensured that the team would stay put in the Tampa Bay area. However, on March 13, 2025, the Rays announced that they would not pursue the stadium. In October, Manfred said that he hoped the league would expand to 32 teams before his term expires in January 2029, but also said he wouldn't proceed with expansion until the Rays reached a deal for a new stadium. The Rays would eventually reach an agreement with the city of Tampa to build a new ballpark with construction set to begin in 2026, clearing the final obstacle to expansion.

=== Austin ===
In July 2024, Austin Baseball Commission LLC was launched: a grassroots organization devoted to bringing an MLB team to Austin, Texas. The organization, founded by sales consultant and marketer Derrik Fox with help from Matt Mackowiak—head of the Travis County Republican Party and founder of Save Austin Now PAC—has the support of Williamson County Judge Bill Gravell and Austin Mayor Kirk Watson. The group cites the early success of MLS' Austin FC team as "proof of concept" that an MLB team will work.

The Austin area is home to the Round Rock Express, which plays at the Dell Diamond in Round Rock, Texas.

=== Charlotte ===
The Charlotte Bats is an organization devoted to bringing an MLB team to Charlotte, North Carolina. In March 2023, the deputy mayor of Charlotte said that no plans for a stadium have been submitted to the Charlotte City Council for consideration.

Charlotte is home to the NBA's Charlotte Hornets, the NFL's Carolina Panthers and the MLS's Charlotte FC. The city has a baseball team, the MiLB's Charlotte Knights, who play at Truist Field.

=== Montreal ===
Discussions about expanding MLB to Montreal, Quebec, have recurred since 2004, when the Montreal Expos, which joined the league in 1969 and played for 36 seasons in the NL East, moved to Washington, D.C., and became the Washington Nationals. The discussions broadened in 2014, when the Toronto Blue Jays began hosting annual preseason weekend exhibition games at Olympic Stadium, the former home of the Expos. After the exhibition weekends drew about 50,000 per game, former and current MLB commissioners Bud Selig and Rob Manfred suggested that Montreal could become a viable baseball city. Exhibition games were played from 2014 to 2019, when they were stopped by the COVID-19 pandemic and the renovation of Olympic Stadium.

In 2012, former Expos player Warren Cromartie founded the Montreal Baseball Project, an advocacy organization that aims to help bring professional baseball back to the city. Montreal Baseball Project has attracted high-profile corporate support, with Canadian companies such as the Royal Bank of Canada, Dollarama, Air Canada, EY Canada, and RDS (Bell Canada) sponsoring the organization. In 2015, Denis Coderre, the mayor of Montreal, and Stephen Bronfman, the son of Expos owner Charles Bronfman, wrote a letter to all 30 MLB teams extolling Montreal as an expansion city. Stephen Bronfman, through his development company Claridge and partner company Devimco, had in 2019 begun to develop a plan to build a 29,072-seat stadium for about $700M CAD on land purchased from the federal government in Montreal's Bassin Peel in the historic Lachine Canal south of downtown. The stadium was to anchor a new mixed-use community and be connected to the REM. The provincial government was reportedly considering offering the group a 30-year loan to help finance the construction of the stadium. The land purchase and stadium development was to work in conjunction with a plan proposed by the Tampa Bay Rays in 2019 to explore the splitting of games between Tampa Bay and Montreal. This plan was rejected by MLB in January 2022, with little subsequent effort.

In December 2025, Montreal-based entrepreneur Ashkan Karbasfrooshan, founder of WatchMojo, announced an exploratory initiative called Project Peanut to bring Major League Baseball back to Montreal through the league’s next expansion window, with the goal of reviving the Montreal Expos. Karbasfrooshan stated that the team’s departure had been a motivating factor in his decision to pursue entrepreneurship.

Montreal is home to the NHL's Montreal Canadiens, the CFL's Montreal Alouettes, and MLS' CF Montreal. The MiLB International League, the Triple-A Montreal Royals played there from 1897 to 1960.

=== Nashville ===
Efforts to bring an MLB team to Nashville, Tennessee, began in the 1980s. A formal group, consisting of Nashville Sounds president Larry Schmittou, Nashville mayor Richard Fulton, and Tennessee governor Lamar Alexander made a presentation to the MLB expansion committee in 1985. The ownership group of the Sounds, including minority owners Conway Twitty, Larry Gatlin, Richard Sterban, Jerry Reed, and Cal Smith, joined the bid to help satisfy the financial requirements of the expansion committee. When MLB formally began an expansion process in 1990, the group drafted a plan to build a 40,000-seat stadium in northern Nashville, at the intersection of Interstate 24 and Briley Parkway. The city was passed over for the 1993 expansion. The group had planned to re-apply for the 1998 expansion, but ultimately chose not to submit a bid.

In 2019, efforts for expansion started to occur again when Music City Baseball was founded by John Loar and Alberto Gonzales. They brought on Dave Stewart to lead them publicly. The organization aims to bring MLB to Nashville, and has indicated that the proposed team would be named the "Nashville Stars", after the Negro league team of that name. The group initially sought land for a stadium by the Cumberland River, but as of June 2022, shifted their focus toward North Nashville near Tennessee State University. The group's intention is to privately fund the stadium.

Nashville is home to the NHL's Nashville Predators, the NFL's Tennessee Titans, and MLS' Nashville SC. The city has a Minor League Baseball team, the Triple-A Nashville Sounds, who play at First Horizon Park.

=== Orlando ===
Efforts to bring an MLB team to Orlando, Florida, began in the 1990s. While a bid was reportedly made before the 1993 expansion, a higher-profile bid was made before the 1998 expansion, spearheaded by Orange County chair Linda Chapin. Plans were made to build an open-air stadium in downtown Orlando, funded partially by a $48 million annual tourist tax, and an ownership group was being developed, with Disney and Orlando Magic executives reportedly being targeted. Orlando was passed over for the Tampa Bay Rays, which already had a stadium: Tropicana Field.

In November 2019, Pat Williams, co-founder of the Orlando Magic, unveiled the "Orlando Dreamers", a concept for an MLB expansion team in Orlando. Thousands of people indicated interest in buying season tickets on the Orlando Dreamers website in the 24 hours after the announcement. The group had proposed building a 45,000-seat domed stadium on a 35.5-acre (14.4 ha) lot near the Orange County Convention Center along with 1,000 hotel rooms, estimating a cost of $1.7 billion. As of May 2023, the group was seeking $975 million in public funds. Williams died in July 2024, putting the project on hiatus. A month later, the Orlando Dreamers indicated that they would continue to push forward to bring a team to Orlando. On January 29, 2025, it was announced that Cincinnati Reds Hall-of-Famer Barry Larkin would join the effort to bring Major League Baseball to Orlando as the MLB Ambassador for the Orlando Dreamers. On March 14, a day after the Tampa Bay Rays canceled their stadium plan in St. Petersburg, the group announced that they had secured a letter of intent for a significant portion of stadium financing and an anchor investor for the control ownership group. On April 25, the Orlando Dreamers announced that they had secured $1.5 billion in funding to attract an MLB team and build a stadium in Orlando. In August 2026, the Dreamers revealed stadium plans which would see a Populous-designed stadium on a site north of Aquatica and south of State Road 52 in a $2 billion mixed-use development which would include three hotel towers with approximately 1,000 rooms, Class A office space, a museum, a multipurpose events center, restaurants, retail space, and other hospitality offerings and attractions alongside the stadium.

Orlando is home to the NBA's Orlando Magic and MLS' Orlando City SC. A team in the MiLB Southern League, the Orlando Rays (originally the Orlando Caps), played there from 1919 to 2003.

=== Portland ===
Efforts to bring an MLB team to Portland, Oregon, began in the early 2000s. Discussions about moving the Montreal Expos included Portland as a potential candidate, among Washington, D.C., and Arlington, Virginia. The Oregon Legislative Assembly passed Senate Bill 5 in 2003, which would have provided $150 million in public funds towards building a stadium, and the use of Providence Park as a temporary venue. But the Expos moved to Washington, D.C., and became the Washington Nationals.

In 2006, the Florida Marlins's difficulties in gathering funds for a new stadium led to talk of a move to Portland or Las Vegas, but the team secured funding the following year.

In 2017, the Portland Diamond Project (PDP) was formed by Craig Cheek, a retired vice president for Nike, Inc., and Mike Barrett, a former broadcaster for the Portland Trail Blazers of the NBA. Russell Wilson and Ciara invested in the group in 2018. In 2018, PDP announced an agreement with the Port of Portland to build a 32,000-seat stadium, designed by Populous, along the Willamette River on a 45.5-acre (18.4 ha) tract of land at Terminal 2 in Northwest Portland. In 2023, PDP considered sites at the Lloyd Center shopping mall in downtown Portland or the Redtail Golf Course in neighboring Beaverton. In January 2024, PDP announced they were in negotiations to purchase the 164-acre (66 ha) Redtail site. On September 23, 2024, PDP announced that they had signed a letter of intent to purchase Zidell Yards, a former industrial waterfront site in the South Portland neighborhood. Oregon governor Tina Kotek signed a bill that authorizes the state to set aside $800 million for the construction of a baseball stadium if Portland is awarded a franchise, with the funds to be repaid by income taxes on players and staff.

Portland is home to the NBA's Portland Trail Blazers and MLS' Portland Timbers. The city has a baseball team, the MiLB High-A Hillsboro Hops, who play at Hillsboro Hops Ballpark; from 1903 to 2010, it had a team in the MiLB PCL, the Triple-A Portland Beavers.

=== Raleigh ===
Alongside Charlotte, Raleigh is the other North Carolina city in contention for an MLB expansion team. Tom Dundon, the owner of the Carolina Hurricanes of the National Hockey League, has stated his intent to lead a group to submit a bid to bring an MLB team to Raleigh, North Carolina, during the next phase of expansion. The Hurricanes have committed long-term to the city, until at least 2044, along with the approved $1.1 billion in upgrades for Lenovo Center and development of a sports and entertainment district around the arena, which could include a baseball stadium. Dundon has stated that securing the capital necessary is a non-issue.

The Raleigh area is home to the Durham Bulls who play at the Durham Bulls Athletic Park in Durham, North Carolina.

=== Sacramento ===
Efforts to bring an MLB team to Sacramento, California, were initiated in the 1980s. ARCO Arena, the former home of the Sacramento Kings, was constructed in 1985 to attract the basketball team that moved from Kansas City. The following year, team owner Gregg Lukenbill began to build a 53,000-seat mixed-used stadium on the property, to be called ARCO Park, intended to bring both the Oakland Athletics and Oakland Raiders to the city. The deal fell through and construction was halted in 1987, after the foundation had been built.

In April 2024, the Athletics entered into an agreement to play three or more seasons in West Sacramento, California. After the press conference announcing the move, Vivek Ranadivé, owner of the Sacramento River Cats and the Sacramento Kings, stated that in conversations with MLB Commissioner Rob Manfred he was told that MLB was seeking to add a West Coast expansion franchise. Ranadivé added that he felt Sacramento would move into "pole position" for a new team, with the A's sojourn being a "good showcase" for the Sacramento market. Ranadivé mentioned the Sacramento Railyards, originally intended as the site for a MLS expansion stadium, as the potential site of a new ballpark. Later in the day, Sacramento Mayor Darrell Steinberg also made mention of Sacramento's intention to seek an MLB expansion franchise during a press conference from city hall, referring to the A's stint in Sacramento as an "audition" for MLB.

On October 20, 2025, Sacramento mayor Kevin McCarty announced that he and West Sacramento mayor Martha Guerrero launched a joint campaign to attract an expansion team, stating that "We are an MLB ready city". When asked about the location of the site within the larger Sacramento metropolitan area, McCarty stated "most likely is the city of West Sacramento. Some people say, 'Wow, you're the mayor of Sacramento, and you don't want to fight for the ballpark in Sacramento?' No. I don't. Wherever it makes the most sense, you know, West Sacramento is the most likely logical location." Regarding the status of such a case for West Sacramento, Guerrero stated "The City of West Sacramento is conducting preliminary studies to evaluate the long-term feasibility of permanently bringing Major League Baseball to West Sacramento, including the financing and infrastructure investments required to build a new stadium....While this work is still in its early stages, we are confident that West Sacramento offers one of the most attractive and strategically positioned locations for Major League Baseball expansion on the West Coast."

Sacramento is currently home to the NBA's Sacramento Kings, in addition to being the temporary home of the Athletics until their new stadium in Paradise, Nevada finishes construction. The city's current baseball team, the MiLB Triple-A Sacramento River Cats, play at Sutter Health Park that they temporarily share with the Athletics.

=== Salt Lake City ===
In April 2023, Gail Miller, the widow of Utah Jazz owner Larry H. Miller and co-founder of the Larry H. Miller Company, announced the formation of Big League Utah, a group of investors looking to obtain an expansion MLB franchise for Salt Lake City, Utah. They also announced their partnership with Rocky Mountain Power to develop a 100-acre (40 ha) lot on the city's west side for a stadium. On February 15, 2024, the Larry H. Miller company announced that they plan to invest at least $3.5 billion towards the lot, bringing mixed-use development to the area, including a baseball stadium. In an interview in September 2026, Utah Jazz and Utah Mammoth owner Ryan Smith gestured towards his company Smith Entertainment Group placing their own MLB expansion bid.

The Salt Lake City area is currently home to the Salt Lake Bees who play at Daybreak Field at America First Square in South Jordan, Utah. Salt Lake City is home to the NBA's Utah Jazz, the NHL's Utah Mammoth, and MLS' Real Salt Lake.

=== Vancouver ===
Discussions regarding the expansion of MLB in Vancouver, British Columbia, had begun in the early 1980s. With the construction of the domed, multipurpose BC Place stadium beginning in 1981 as part of Vancouver's hosting preparations for Expo 86, Jim Pattison (owner of the Triple-A Vancouver Canadians of the Pacific Coast League, and owner of Jim Pattison Group), with the support of Molson Breweries, had begun aggressively pursuing an expansion or existing team to play in BC Place. However, the league ultimately did not expand throughout the 1980s and the expansion bid lost momentum. Around this time, the Seattle Mariners were reportedly considering playing up to 15 games a year in Vancouver amid struggling attendance, but this ultimately never materialized. BC Place would later eventually host multiple preseason exhibition games, with the final games being a series between the Toronto Blue Jays, Montreal Expos, Seattle Mariners, and Colorado Rockies in April 1994. Vancouver is currently home to the Vancouver Canadians who play at Nat Bailey Stadium.

In 2014, Vancouver Canadians president Andy Dunn brought UBC Thunderbirds players to BC Place to trial batting practice in the stadium in hopes of securing new MLB exhibition games. In February 2020, it was reported that MLB officials and Arizona Diamondbacks staff had travelled to Vancouver to assess BC Place's viability as a backup venue (due to structural concerns with the roof at Chase Field), in addition to the overall viability of professional baseball in Vancouver. Vancouver was mentioned as a potential expansion city by commissioner Rob Manfred, as well as various journalistic insiders on multiple occasions, as recently as February 2024. Vancouver was raised as a candidate for expansion once more in October 2025, as a result of the incredibly strong showing of Blue Jays fans in Seattle and Vancouver during the 2025 ALCS against the Seattle Mariners, with Manfred stating “another city in Canada could clearly work for us” when asked about Vancouver in an interview. In April 2026, Vancouver mayor Ken Sim voiced his support for bringing an MLB expansion team to the city. In April 2026, the Globe and Mail reported that local real estate developer Zack Ross, owner of Cape Group, was the leading figure behind a new expansion bid group. It was also indicated that the ownership groups of the NHL's Seattle Kraken and the NFL's San Francisco 49ers were parties potentially interested in joining the bid, and that architecture firm Populous had been retained to design a baseball stadium for a potential Site in Vancouver's False Creek neighbourhood near the Vancouver Olympic Village. In July 2026, Ross launched The Show Vancouver (TSV) expansion bid group in order to begin working with the city on stadium planning and attracting investors.

Vancouver is home to the NHL's Vancouver Canucks, the CFL's BC Lions, and MLS' Vancouver Whitecaps, in addition to formerly being the home of the NBA's Vancouver Grizzlies, who played in the city from 1995 to 2001. The city also has a baseball team, the MiLB High-A Vancouver Canadians, who play at Nat Bailey Stadium.

== Teams ==
MLB originated in 1903 with 16 teams, from the signing of the National Agreement between the National League (founded 1876) and the American League (founded 1901). After team expansions, contractions, and moves, MLB now consists of 30 teams. The United States is home to 29 teams; one is located in Canada.

The following table shows teams that participated in the 2025 MLB season, their home city, year founded, year joined (including league), and how many times each has moved and changed names.

=== Current ===
Team	Location	Founded	Joined	Moved	Renamed
Arizona Diamondbacks	Phoenix, Arizona	1998		0	0
Athletics	West Sacramento, California (Note: The Oakland Athletics plan to move to Paradise, Nevada when their new stadium is completed. The Athletics left Oakland Coliseum in Oakland, California following the conclusion of the 2024 Major League Baseball season.)	1901		4	0
Atlanta Braves	Cumberland, Georgia	1871 (NA)	1876 (NL)	2	7
Baltimore Orioles	Baltimore, Maryland	1901		2	2
Boston Red Sox	Boston, Massachusetts	1901		0	1
Chicago Cubs	Chicago, Illinois	1870 (NA)	1876 (NL)	0	3
Chicago White Sox	Chicago, Illinois	1901		0	1
Cincinnati Reds	Cincinnati, Ohio	1882 (AA)	1890 (NL)	0	2
Cleveland Guardians	Cleveland, Ohio	1901		0	4
Colorado Rockies	Denver, Colorado	1993		0	0
Detroit Tigers	Detroit, Michigan	1894		0	0
Houston Astros	Houston, Texas	1962 (NL)	2013 (AL)	0	1
Kansas City Royals	Kansas City, Missouri	1969		0	0
Los Angeles Angels	Anaheim, California	1961		0	4
Los Angeles Dodgers	Los Angeles, California	1884 (AA)	1890 (NL)	1	10
Miami Marlins	Miami, Florida	1993		0	1
Milwaukee Brewers	Milwaukee, Wisconsin	1969 (AL)	1998 (NL)	1	1
Minnesota Twins	Minneapolis, Minnesota	1901		1	1
New York Mets	New York, New York	1962		0	0
New York Yankees	New York, New York	1903		0	1
Philadelphia Phillies	Philadelphia, Pennsylvania	1883		0	4
Pittsburgh Pirates	Pittsburgh, Pennsylvania	1882 (AA)	1887 (NL)	0	1
San Diego Padres	San Diego, California	1969		0	0
San Francisco Giants	San Francisco, California	1883		1	1
Seattle Mariners	Seattle, Washington	1977		0	0
St. Louis Cardinals	St. Louis, Missouri	1882 (AA)	1892 (NL)	0	3
Tampa Bay Rays	St. Petersburg, Florida	1998		0	1
Texas Rangers	Arlington, Texas	1961		1	1
Toronto Blue Jays	Toronto, Ontario	1977		0	0
Washington Nationals	Washington, D.C.	1969		1	1

=== Former ===
Team	Location	Founded	Entered AL or NL	Years active	Left AL or NL	Reason
Baltimore Orioles	Baltimore, Maryland	1882 (AA)	1892	8	1899	Financial
Baltimore Orioles	Baltimore, Maryland	1901		2	1902	—
Buffalo Bisons	Buffalo, New York	1879		7	1885	Sold
Cincinnati Reds	Cincinnati, Ohio	1876		4	1879	—
Cincinnati Stars	Cincinnati, Ohio	1880		1	1880	Expulsion
Cleveland Blues	Cleveland, Ohio	1879		6	1884	Sold
Cleveland Spiders	Cleveland, Ohio	1887 (AA)	1889	11	1899	Financial
Detroit Wolverines	Detroit, Michigan	1881		8	1888	Financial
Hartford Dark Blues / Brooklyn Hartfords	Hartford, Connecticut / Brooklyn, New York	1874 (NA)	1876	2	1877	—
Indianapolis Blues	Indianapolis, Indiana	1877 (LA)	1878	1	1878	—
Kansas City Cowboys	Kansas City, Missouri	1886		1	1886	Financial
Louisville Colonels	Louisville, Kentucky	1882 (AA)	1892	8	1899	Financial
Louisville Grays	Louisville, Kentucky	1876		2	1877	Expulsion
Milwaukee Grays	Milwaukee, Wisconsin	1877 (LA)	1878	1	1878	—
New York Mutuals	Hoboken, New Jersey / Brooklyn, New York	1857 (NABBP)	1876	1	1876	Expulsion
Philadelphia Athletics	Philadelphia, Pennsylvania	1861 (NABBP)	1876	1	1876	Expulsion
Providence Grays	Providence, Rhode Island	1878		8	1885	Financial
St. Louis Brown Stockings	St. Louis, Missouri	1875 (NA)	1876	2	1877	Expulsion
St. Louis Maroons / Indianapolis Hoosiers	St. Louis, Missouri / Indianapolis, Indiana	1884 (UA)	1885	5	1889	—
Syracuse Stars	Syracuse, New York	1877 (ind)	1879	1	1879	—
Troy Trojans	Troy, New York / Watervliet, New York	1879		4	1882	Small market
Washington Nationals	Washington, D.C.	1886		4	1889	—
Washington Senators	Washington, D.C.	1891 (AA)	1892	8	1899	Financial
Worcester Worcesters	Worcester, Massachusetts	1879	1880	3	1882	Small market

== See also ==
- Timeline of Major League Baseball

== Bibliography ==
- Armour, Mark L.; Levitt, Daniel R. (2004). Paths to Glory: How Great Baseball Teams Got That Way. Potomac Books. ISBN 9781574888058.
- "Key dates in Expos history". CBC Sports. 2004. Archived from the original on February 26, 2008.
- "Blue Jays fever sweeps Toronto". Canadian Broadcasting Corporation. August 18, 2011. Archived from the original on May 21, 2012.
- Cour, Jim (June 27, 1999). "Good riddance". Austin American-Statesman.
- Davidi, Shi (2016). The Big 50: The men and moments that made the Toronto Blue Jays. Triumph Books. ISBN 978-1-62937-208-2.
- Dickson, Paul (2009). The Dickson Baseball Dictionary (3 ed.). W. W. Norton & Company. ISBN 9780393066814.
- Jozsa, Frank P. (2006). Big Sports, Big Business: A Century of League Expansions, Mergers, and Reorganizations. Greenwood Publishing Group. ISBN 0275991342.
- Longley, Neil (2013). An Absence of Competition: The Sustained Competitive Advantage of the Monopoly Sports Leagues. Springer Science+Business Media. ISBN 9781461494850.
- Jozsa, Jr., Frank (2010). Major League Baseball Expansions and Relocations: A History, 1876–2008. McFarland & Company. ISBN 9780786457236.
- MacIntosh, Heather (March 1, 2000). "Kingdome: The Controversial Birth of a Seattle Icon (1959–1976)". HistoryLink. Archived from the original on January 16, 2013.
- "History of the Expos". Archived from the original on June 28, 2004.
- "Baseball back in Montreal". Ottawa Citizen. Associated Press. May 28, 1968.
- Peterson, John E. (2003). The Kansas City Athletics: A Baseball History, 1954–1967. McFarland. ISBN 9780786481439.
- Purdy, Dennis (2010). Kiss 'Em Goodbye: An ESPN Treasury of Failed, Forgotten, and Departed Teams. Random House Digital. ISBN 9780345520470.
- Riess, Steven A. (2006). Encyclopedia of Major League Baseball Clubs. Greenwood Publishing Group. ISBN 0313329915.
- Schaefer, Kurt (2000). "Play Ball!". Columbia Magazine. 14 (2). Washington State Historical Society. Archived from the original on April 22, 2008.
- Sgambati, Fred (May 1, 1976). "Toronto joins baseball's big leagues". CBC News. Archived from the original on January 17, 2013.
- "Walter O'Malley is retiring". Sarasota Herald-Tribune. Associated Press. December 6, 1968.
- "Baseball expansion topic". The Spokesman-Review. Associated Press. November 26, 1967.
- "1976–1979". Franchise Timeline. Toronto Blue Jays. Archived from the original on October 15, 2007.
- "John McHale, 86: Expos' first president". Toronto Star. January 17, 2008. Archived from the original on June 7, 2023.
- Wolf, Bob (July 11, 1968). "Montreal in, we're dead in National". Milwaukee Journal.
- Zimniuch, Fran (2013). Baseball's New Frontier: A History of Expansion, 1961–1998. University of Nebraska Press. ISBN 9780803246829.
