= Proposed Tampa Bay Rays stadium =

- Rendering of proposed stadium
- Interactive map of Proposed Tampa Bay Rays stadium
- Location: Tampa, Florida, U.S.
- Coordinates: 27°58′29″N 82°30′23″W
- Capacity: 31,000
- Type: Ballpark
- Roof: Skylight
- Acreage: 113

Construction
- Groundbreaking: Fall 2026 (planned)
- Opened: 2029 (planned)
- Cost: US$2.3 billion (estimate)
- Architect: Populous

Tenant
- Tampa Bay Rays (MLB) (expected 2029)

Website
- https://newballpark.raysbaseball.com/

A new indoor ballpark is proposed to be built at the Hillsborough College campus in Tampa, Florida. If constructed, it would serve as the home of the Tampa Bay Rays of Major League Baseball (MLB). This is the latest proposal for a new Tampa Bay Rays stadium, in addition to Gas Plant Stadium proposed in 2023, Ybor Stadium proposed in 2018 and Rays Ballpark proposed in 2007. The Rays have played in Tropicana Field in St. Petersburg since their inaugural season in 1998, with the exception of the 2025 season at George M. Steinbrenner Field as a result of the impact of Hurricane Milton.

The plan for the stadium and adjacent development is inspired by The Battery associated with Truist Park, home ballpark of the Atlanta Braves. This 31,000 seat ballpark is projected to open in time for the 2029 MLB season, which follows the end of the team's contract to play at Tropicana Field through the 2028 season. The push for a new home for the Rays is due to the cost replacing the roof at Tropicana Field, plus other maintenance costs associated with the stadium which was built in 1990. Construction of the ballpark is scheduled to begin in 2026.

== Background ==
On January 20, 2026, the Board of Trustees for Hillsborough College unanimously approved a Memorandum of Understanding (MOU) for initiating discussion to negotiate a contract to build a baseball stadium for the Tampa Bay Rays. In addition to this MOU, the organization still needed approval from Tampa City Council and the Hillsborough County Commission prior to beginning construction.

As part of the development process, Florida Governor Ron DeSantis indicated that the state owned land on which Hillsborough College sat would be transferred to the institution, then the Rays would then negotiate directly with the college. DeSantis further stated that state funding would not likely be used to directly fund the stadium.

On February 4, the Hillsborough County Commission unanimously approved a proposal to pursue financial framework to help finance the stadium.

This plan gained support of Commissioner of Baseball Rob Manfred, DeSantis and the team actively courted the community surrounding the stadium development. At MLB's quarterly meeting, Manfred stated he was supportive of the work of the new owners and was optimistic about the project going forward.

Hillsborough College would see ancillary benefit from this project. With a number of buildings on campus at 50 years old, upkeep costs have become increasingly expensive.

On May 14, the team presented a non-binding Memorandum of Understanding (MOU) regarding the preliminary terms for the stadium project.

On May 20, the Hillsborough County Commissioners formally approved this MOU with a 5-2 vote. The same day, the Hillsborough College Board of Trustees unanimously approved the issue of a lease of 99 years to the Rays to build the stadium on college land. The following day, the Tampa City Council approved the same MOU on a vote of 4–3.

On August 27, Tampa City Council approved their contract with the Rays by a vote of 4–3. This agreement covers an obligation of $80 million, split into four equal payments, for stadium development on the 115 acre area currently occupied by Hillsborough College. The following day, Hillsborough County approved their deal with the Rays on a vote of 5–2, worth a total of nearly $800 million in funding.

Groundbreaking was scheduled to take place in October 2026 with the goal to have the stadium completed and ready for Opening Day in 2029, but it has been postponed indefinitely as the team is still seeking approval from Tampa and Hillsborough County, albeit publicly maintaining the same opening schedule.

== Funding ==
Initial estimates of the cost for just the stadium are set at $2.3 billion, based on cost estimates provided by Skanska. Additional funds would be needed for the surrounding development and relocation of the Hillsborough College buildings. The Rays are seeking a private/public partnership to help fund the stadium. The Tampa Sports Authority has been involved in these discussions. The team is expected to fund over half of the cost of the initial stadium build, in addition to any renovations, maintenance or repairs incurred over the life of the stadium. Potential funding by Hillsborough County would be sourced from bonds issued by a Community development district surrounding the stadium and tourist facing taxes such as hotel bed fees and the tax on short-term rentals.

It was estimated that the commission was willing to commit $800 million in bonds to help fund the project, which was less than the estimated $1.15 billion in public funds needed for the project. Part of the discussion revolved around how much "community investment" tax would be required for use in funding. Any future funding proposals would be presented to the Tampa Sports Authority, the city of Tampa and the Hillsborough County commission.

On February 24, 2026, the Florida Cabinet and DeSantis granted an adjacent 22 acre property to Hillsborough College, which was included in the negotiation of this ballpark district.

On March 13, 2026, the team sought a $467 million funding stream from Hillsborough County sales tax sources. Many Hillsborough County Commissioners (Joshua Wostal, Donna Cameron Cepeda and Gwen Myers) publicly opposed using Community Investment Tax, the county’s half-cent sales tax, to fund stadiums. Commissioner Ken Hagan stated that he believed the stadium deal would not move forward without this funding. An additional potential funding source could come from Hillsborough County's 6% tax on short-term lodging. A vote on approving this allocation had the potential to happen as early as April 1, although Commmissioner Wostal hstated that he believed there had been insufficitient public feedback.

In a report commissioned by the Tampa Sports Authority and analyzed by Skanska, the estimated cost of the stadium could have rise as much as $300 million due to construction due to weight and complexity of the roof design and material. Per the report, the "grid shell roof" was also susceptible to storm debris. In response, team CEO Ken Babby reiterated the team's commitment to financing this or any other construction cost overrun.

A draft memorandum of understanding (MOU) was released on April 9, 2026, which included non-specific public funding sources for the stadium. Still to be determined at the date of release was the "Sources and Uses" language which needed to be finalized prior to the finalization of the agreement. As of this draft, the team was willing to commit up to $1.235 billion in funding of the estimated $2.3 billion in cost of the stadium. The remaining roughly $1 billion would be split between the county at $750 million and the city at $251 million. An approval on June 1, 2026 would keep the project on track to open by the start of the 2029 baseball season. The CIT (community investment tax) remained a sticking point for funding, as this was seen as "off limits" to help fund new stadiums, though the team is looking into alternative public funding sources. Other public funding could come from tourist taxes or from the site itself (Community Reinvestment Act/CRA), but those totals were still undetermined. All funding needed to be specified and subsequently approved by Hillsborough County and the city of Tampa, before ultimately being approved by MLB.

Included in the preliminary Memorandum of Understanding (MOU) presented on May 14, 2026, public funding settled at $976 million. Of that, $796 million came from Hillsborough County ($360 million from Community Investment Tax, $303 million from Tourist Development Tax, $103 million from other unspecified county funds, $30 million (approximately) from HUD disaster recovery reimbursement funds) and $180 million from the city of Tampa ($100 million from CRA/tax-increment funding, $80 million from Community Investment Tax).

On June 29, 2026, DeSantis signed the 2026-27 Florida state budget, which included a $50 million line item allocated to relocate Hillsborough College to a different footprint within the existing Dale Mabry campus site and relevant infrastructure. College president Dr. Ken Atwater stated that the rebuilt campus would occupy 10-15 acres of the proposed 130 development site.

On July 17, AECOM Hunt/Turner was chosen as the construction manager for this project. A five member committee including Dr. Ken Atwater from Hillsborough College and Matt Silverman from the Rays ranked AECOM Hunt and Turner construction as the top ranked firm out of four who submitted bids. This came prior to any approval from either the Tampa City Council or the Hillsborough County Commission.

Per final approval from the Tampa City County and Hillsborough Commission, the city of Tampa is responsible for $80 million, while Hillsborough County is responsible for $796 million.

== Project layout ==
The site would included a baseball stadium in the southeast corner of the property along Dale Mabry Highway in the "Champions Corner" section. Hillsborough College relocating to the southwest portion of the property in the "Innovation Edge". This construction would not be part of the ballpark construction, but operated by Hillsborough College. Supplemental development would also be built in the northwest portion of the property in "The Canopy" section. The size of the entire project is estimated to be 113 acres, with the ballpark itself occupying a smaller section thereof. In an effort to make the site available for year-round use, the land around the stadium is anticipated to included residences, retail, restaurants and bars. The entire development, stadium plus additional amenities across the 113 acre site, could total $8-10 billion in combined total investment. Rays ownership cited ease of entry and exit as a priority for this project.

The first stadium renderings were released on the project website on February 5, 2026. Contained on the official website, economics impact provided by RCLCO include: $34 billion in economic impact over 30 years, 9.8 million annual visitors and 11,908 estimated new on-site jobs.

Of the proposed 113 acres of development overall, 22 acres would be designated for use for Hillsborough College specifically.

On July 1, the Rays began the search for a construction manager for the construction project, with a final decision made by August 14. This position would only cover stadium construction, not construction for Hillsborough College or any of the surrounding mixed use development. The team made this announcement after the non-binding Memorandum of Understanding (MOU) passed by the Hillsborough County Commission and Tampa City Council, but before any binding votes. A list of stadium specifics was outlined in the announcement, including a rays tank similar to what is found in Tropicana Field. Later in the month, the Rays revealed the first interior renderings of the ballpark.

On August 26, 2026, Hillsborough College contracted with Pure Project Management LLC of Philadelphia to manage the development of the next phase of the Dale Mabry campus. This firm has previous connections to the community with its work with USF of multiple projects. As of this date, HC has received $50 million of up to $215 million needed for this project. Although the Patel Allied Health Center and science buildings are scheduled to remain operational beyond this construction, many of the existing buildings are scheduled to be replaced. Once funding and approvals are in place, construction could start as early as Fall 2026.
