= Ybor Stadium =

Cancelled stadium proposal in Tampa, Florida, US

- Location in Florida Location in the United States
- Location: Tampa, Florida, U.S.
- Coordinates: 27°57′26″N 82°26′40″W
- Capacity: 30,842
- Surface: Artificial turf
- Acreage: 14

Construction
- Cost: $892 million (estimate)
- Architect: Populous

Tenant
- Tampa Bay Rays (MLB)

Ybor Stadium was a proposed baseball park in the Ybor City neighborhood of Tampa, Florida. If approved and constructed, it would have served as the home of the Tampa Bay Rays of Major League Baseball.

== Proposal ==
In 2017, the Tampa Bay Rays of Major League Baseball (MLB) finished the season with an average paid attendance of 15,477 per game, the lowest in MLB, and a stadium with the lowest capacity in MLB in Tropicana Field (31,042). The Rays have been looking for a new site to build a stadium, as St. Petersburg is difficult for fans from Tampa to access.

On July 10, 2018, the Rays announced they would vacate Tropicana Field and relocate to the Ybor City neighborhood of Tampa, between 15th Street and Channelside Drive from east to west, and between Fourth Avenue and Adamo Drive from north to south. While the Rays have a contract to play in Tropicana Field through 2027, they have reached an agreement for an early departure.

The architectural firm, Populous, announced the futuristic ballpark would feature "dramatic" sliding glass walls and a fully enclosed, translucent roof. The park would use artificial turf.

Construction was estimated to cost $892 million. Ballpark construction was estimated at $550 million; the roof would cost approximately $245 million, with about $83 million coming from ancillary infrastructure spending. The construction costs also included a parking garage and pedestrian bridge. The Rays announced they were expecting taxpayers to fund most of its construction, despite some controversy regarding the limited evidence of public benefits arising from subsidizing such projects. The stadium would be a year-round entertainment venue and will not be exclusively used for baseball games. The proposal called for 28,216 seats with a total capacity of 30,842, which would make it the smallest MLB stadium by capacity. The ballpark was slated to be ready by the start of the 2023 season. However, in December 2018, the project was abruptly cancelled.

In 2025, the land developer said the site was still available should the Rays want to build a new ballpark there.

== See also ==
- List of current Major League Baseball stadiums
- Rays Ballpark
- Gas Plant Stadium
- Proposed Hillsborough College ballpark
