= Tropicana Field =

Baseball stadium in St. Petersburg, Florida, U.S.

- The Trop

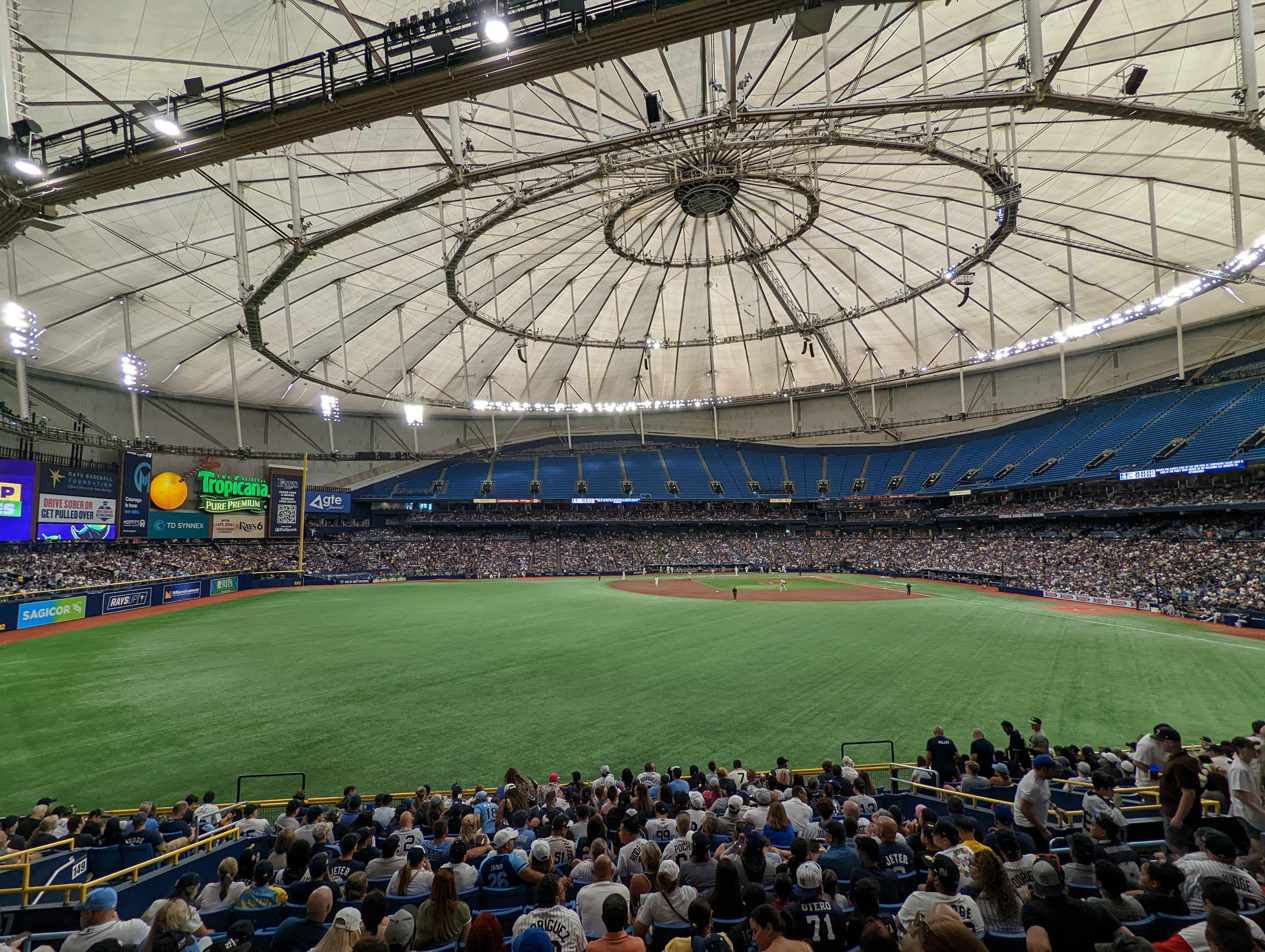
- View from left-center field in 2022

- Location within the United States Location within Florida
- Former names: Florida Suncoast Dome (1990–1993); ThunderDome (1993–1996)
- Address: One Tropicana Drive
- Location: St. Petersburg, Florida, U.S.
- Coordinates: 27°46′6″N 82°39′12″W
- Elevation: 40 feet (12 m) AMSL
- Owner: City of St. Petersburg
- Operator: Tampa Bay Rays Ltd.
- Capacity: 45,369 (1998); 44,027 (1999); 44,445 (2000–2001); 43,772 (2002–2006); 38,437 (2007); 36,048 (2008); 36,973 (2009–2010); 34,078 (2011–2013); 31,042 (2014–2018); 25,025 (2019–present, expandable to 42,735)
- Surface: AstroTurf (1998–1999); FieldTurf (2000–2010); AstroTurf GameDay Grass (2011–2017); Shaw Sports Turf (2017–present)
- Record attendance: 48,044 (WWE Royal Rumble 2024)
- Field size: Left Field – 315 ft (96 m); Left-Center – 370 ft (110 m); Center Field – 404 ft (123 m); Right-Center – 370 ft (110 m); Right Field – 322 ft (98 m); Backstop – 50 ft (15 m)
- Public transit: 16th Street & 1st Avenue S

Construction
- Groundbreaking: November 22, 1986
- Opened: March 3, 1990; 36 years ago
- Renovated: 2014, 2025
- Closed: 2025; 1 year ago (temporarily due to Hurricane Milton repairs and restoration)
- Reopened: April 6, 2026
- Cost: US$130 million ($320 million in 2025 dollars)
- Architects: HOK Sport (Kansas City); Lescher & Mahoney Sports (Tampa); Criswell, Blizzard & Blouin Architects (St. Petersburg)
- Structural engineers: Martin/Martin Consulting Engineers, Inc. (bowl); Geiger Engineers P.C. (roof)
- Services engineers: M-E Engineers, Inc.
- General contractor: Huber, Hunt & Nichols

Tenants
- Tampa Bay Storm (AFL) 1991–1996; Tampa Bay Lightning (NHL) 1993–1996; Tampa Bay Devil Rays/Rays (MLB) 1998–2024, 2026–present St. Petersburg Bowl (NCAA) 2008–2017

Tropicana Field, nicknamed "The Trop", is a domed multi-purpose stadium in the southeastern United States, located in St. Petersburg, Florida. It is the home of the Tampa Bay Rays of Major League Baseball (MLB). The venue is the only nonretractable domed stadium in the MLB and is a notable local attraction in the Tampa Bay Area.

The stadium opened in 1990 as the Florida Suncoast Dome. The Tampa Bay Lightning moved to the facility in 1993 and renamed it the ThunderDome. The Lightning played there until moving to their new home in downtown Tampa in 1996. In October 1996, Tropicana Products, a fruit juice company then based in nearby Bradenton, signed a 30-year naming rights deal.

Tropicana Field's location and design (especially the ceiling catwalks) have been widely criticized, and it is often cited as one of the worst stadiums in MLB, which itself has cited the need to replace Tropicana Field as one of the primary obstacles to future expansion.

In 2023, the Tampa Bay Rays announced a deal with local politicians to build Gas Plant Stadium, a new stadium near Tropicana Field at an expected cost of $1.2 billion, half of which would fall on taxpayers. In March 2025, the Rays cancelled the deal.

On October 9, 2024, much of the translucent, fiberglass roof membrane of Tropicana Field was destroyed by Hurricane Milton. Repairs began in July 2025 and were completed in April 2026. Due to the hurricane damage, the Rays played their home games for the 2025 season at George M. Steinbrenner Field in Tampa before returning to Tropicana Field on April 6, 2026, with a 6–4 win over the Chicago Cubs.

As of March 2026, the Tampa Bay Rays are advancing a new, potentially $2.3B stadium project on the Hillsborough Community College Dale Mabry campus, featuring a 30,000–35,000 capacity venue and a surrounding entertainment district near Raymond James Stadium with a planned 2029 opening.

== History ==
After Tampa was awarded the Tampa Bay Buccaneers and Tampa Bay Rowdies in the 1970s, St. Petersburg decided it wanted a share of the professional sports scene in the Tampa Bay area. City officials decided early on that the city would attempt to attract Major League Baseball. Possible designs for a baseball park or multipurpose stadium were proposed as early as 1983. One such design, in the same location where Tropicana Field would ultimately be built, called for an open-air stadium with a circus tent-like covering. It took several design cues from open-air Kauffman Stadium in Kansas City, Missouri, including fountains beyond the outfield wall.

Ultimately, city officials decided Tampa Bay's hot, humid summers and frequent thunderstorms made a domed stadium a must for an MLB team to be viable. Construction began in 1986 in the hope that it would lure an MLB team to the facility. Chuck Berry was the entertainment for the ground breaking ceremony.

=== 1990s ===
The stadium was finished in 1990. Named the Florida Suncoast Dome, it was built to MLB specifications, and was designed specifically to provide an expansion or relocated team with a move-in ready stadium. It hosted the 1990 Davis Cup Finals that autumn, and several rock concerts, but still had no tenants. While it helped make St. Petersburg a finalist in the MLB expansion for 1993, the city lost out to Miami and Denver. Rumors arose of the Seattle Mariners moving in the early part of the 1990s, and the San Francisco Giants came close to moving to the area, with Tampa Bay investors announcing their purchase of the team and its relocation in a press conference in 1992. However, the sale and move were blocked by National League owners, who voted against the deal in November 1992 under pressure from San Francisco officials and the then-owner of the Florida Marlins, Blockbuster Video Chairman H. Wayne Huizenga. A local boycott of Blockbuster Video stores occurred for several years thereafter.

The Suncoast Dome finally got a regular tenant in 1991, when the Arena Football League's Tampa Bay Storm made their debut. Two years later, the National Hockey League's Tampa Bay Lightning made the stadium their home for three seasons. In the process, the Suncoast Dome was renamed the ThunderDome. Because of the large capacity of what was basically a park built for baseball, several NHL and AFL attendance records were set during the Lightning and Storm's tenures there.

Finally, in 1995, the ThunderDome received a baseball team when MLB expanded to the Tampa Bay area with the Tampa Bay Devil Rays. Changes were made to the stadium and its naming rights were sold to Tropicana Products, which renamed it Tropicana Field in 1996. The relocation of the Lightning and Storm into what is now Benchmark International Arena in downtown Tampa upon its completion permitted "The Trop" to be vacated for conversion to baseball. A US$70 million renovation then took place—to upgrade a stadium that had cost $130 million to complete only eight years earlier. Ebbets Field was the model for the renovations, which included a replica of the famous rotunda that greeted Dodger fans for many years. The first regular-season baseball game took place at the park on March 31, 1998, when the Devil Rays faced the Detroit Tigers, losing 11–6. Luis Gonzalez of the Tigers hit the first home run at the stadium, followed by Wade Boggs hitting the first Devil Rays homer later that game. Boggs also hit a home run for his 3,000th hit at Tropicana Field in 1999. Boggs' historic home runs are commemorated with golden seats and plaques where the balls landed in the right-field seats.

Although Tropicana was purchased by PepsiCo in 1998, the company refrained from making any changes to the park's naming rights, as the brand is popular among the local fanbase.

=== 2000s ===
Initially built with a conventional AstroTurf surface, it was replaced in 2000 with infilled FieldTurf, and upgraded to FieldTurf Duo prior to the 2007 season. It has always featured a traditional "full dirt" infield, instead of the "sliding pits" design that was common during the 1970s and 1980s, making it the first artificial turf field with a full dirt infield since Busch Stadium II in 1976. Since Tropicana Field does not need to convert between baseball and football, sliding pits, designed to save reconfiguration time, were unnecessary. Tropicana has hosted football games, but never during baseball season. On August 6, 2007, the AstroTurf warning track was replaced by brown-colored, stone-filled FieldTurf Duo.

Tropicana Field underwent a further $25 million facelift prior to the 2006 season. Another $10 million in improvements were added during the season. In 2006, the Devil Rays added a live cownose ray tank to Tropicana Field, located just behind the center field wall, in clear view of the play on the field. People can go up to the tank to touch the creatures. Further improvements prior to the 2007 offseason, in addition to the new FieldTurf, include additional family features in the right-field area, the creation of a new premium club, and several new video boards including a new 35 ft × 64 ft (11 m × 20 m) Daktronics LED main video board that is four times larger than the original video board. The 2007 renovation also added built-in HDTV capabilities to the stadium, with Fox Sports Florida and WXPX airing at least a quarter of the schedule in HD in 2007 and accommodating the new video board's 16x9 aspect ratio.

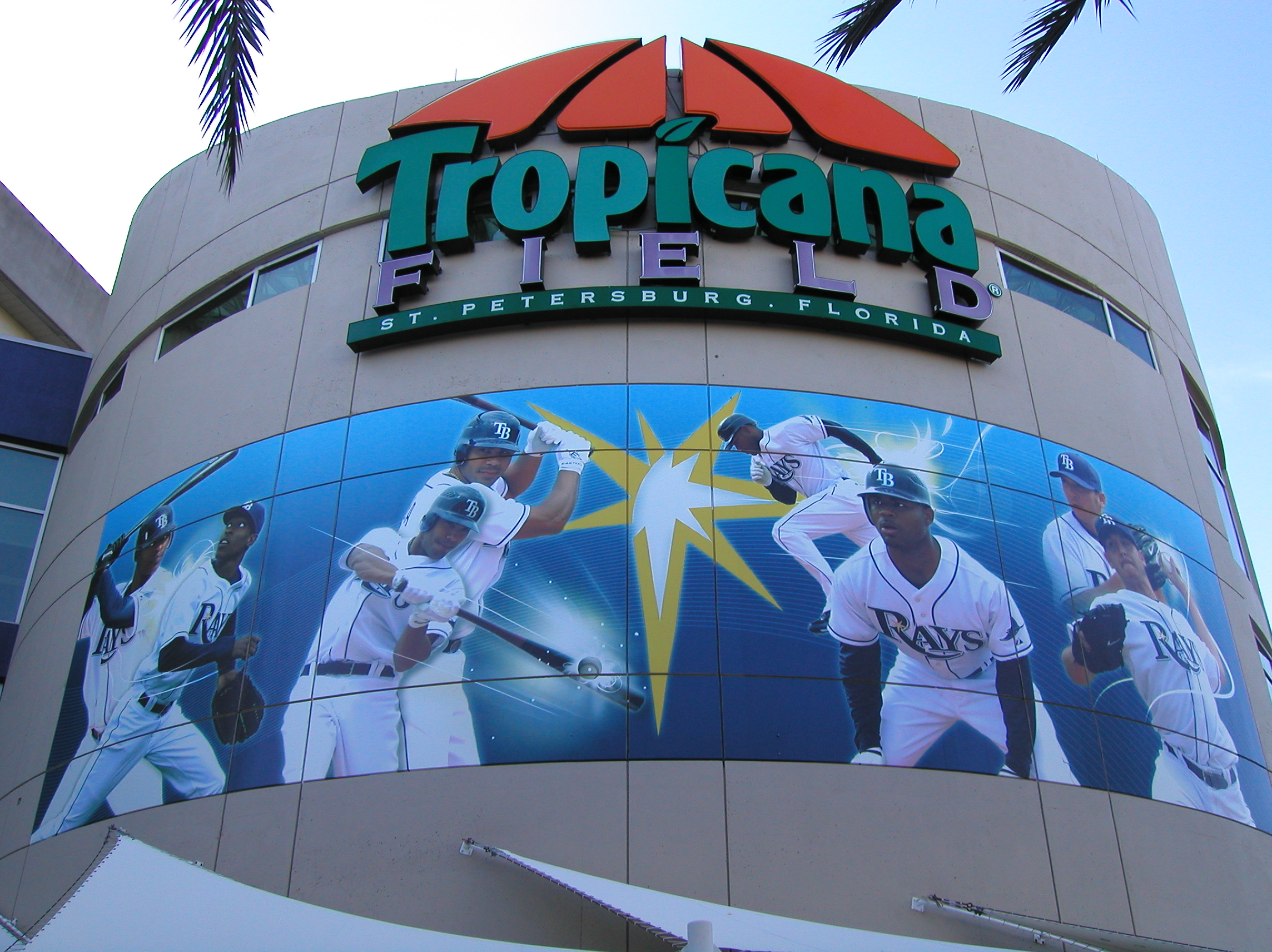
Entrance rotunda façade as it appeared in 2008

On September 3, 2008, in a game between the Rays and the New York Yankees, Tropicana Field had the first official use of instant replay in the history of MLB. The disputed play involved a home run hit above the left-field foul pole by Yankee Alex Rodriguez. The ball was called a home run on the field, but was close enough that the umpires opted to view the replay to verify the call. Later, the Trop had the first case of a call being overturned by instant replay, when a fly ball by Carlos Peña originally ruled a ground-rule double due to fan interference, was overturned and made a home run on September 19. The umpires determined that the fan in question, originally believed to have reached over the right-field wall, did not do so.

In October 2008, Tropicana Field hosted its first baseball postseason games as the Rays met the Chicago White Sox in the American League Division Series, the Boston Red Sox in the American League Championship Series (ALCS), and the Philadelphia Phillies in the World Series. It hosted the on-field trophy presentations for the Rays when they became the American League Champions on October 19, following game 7 of the ALCS. Chase Utley hit the first World Series home run at Tropicana Field during the first inning of game 1 of the 2008 World Series. The Rays ended up losing the game 3–2 and eventually the World Series to the Phillies 4 games to 1.

Since 2008, the top third of the upper-deck seating has been tarped over, artificially reducing the stadium's capacity to 36,048 for the 2008 regular season. It was further reduced to 35,041 for the 2008 postseason, since the 300-level Party Deck had been reserved by MLB as an auxiliary press area. On October 14, 2008, the Rays announced that the upper-deck tarps would be removed for the remainder of the postseason, starting with game 6 of the ALCS. This increased the capacity of the stadium to nearly 41,000, depending on standing-room-only tickets sold. (Note: ALCS Game 6 had an announced attendance of 40,947, while game 7 had an announced attendance of 40,473.)

=== 2010s ===
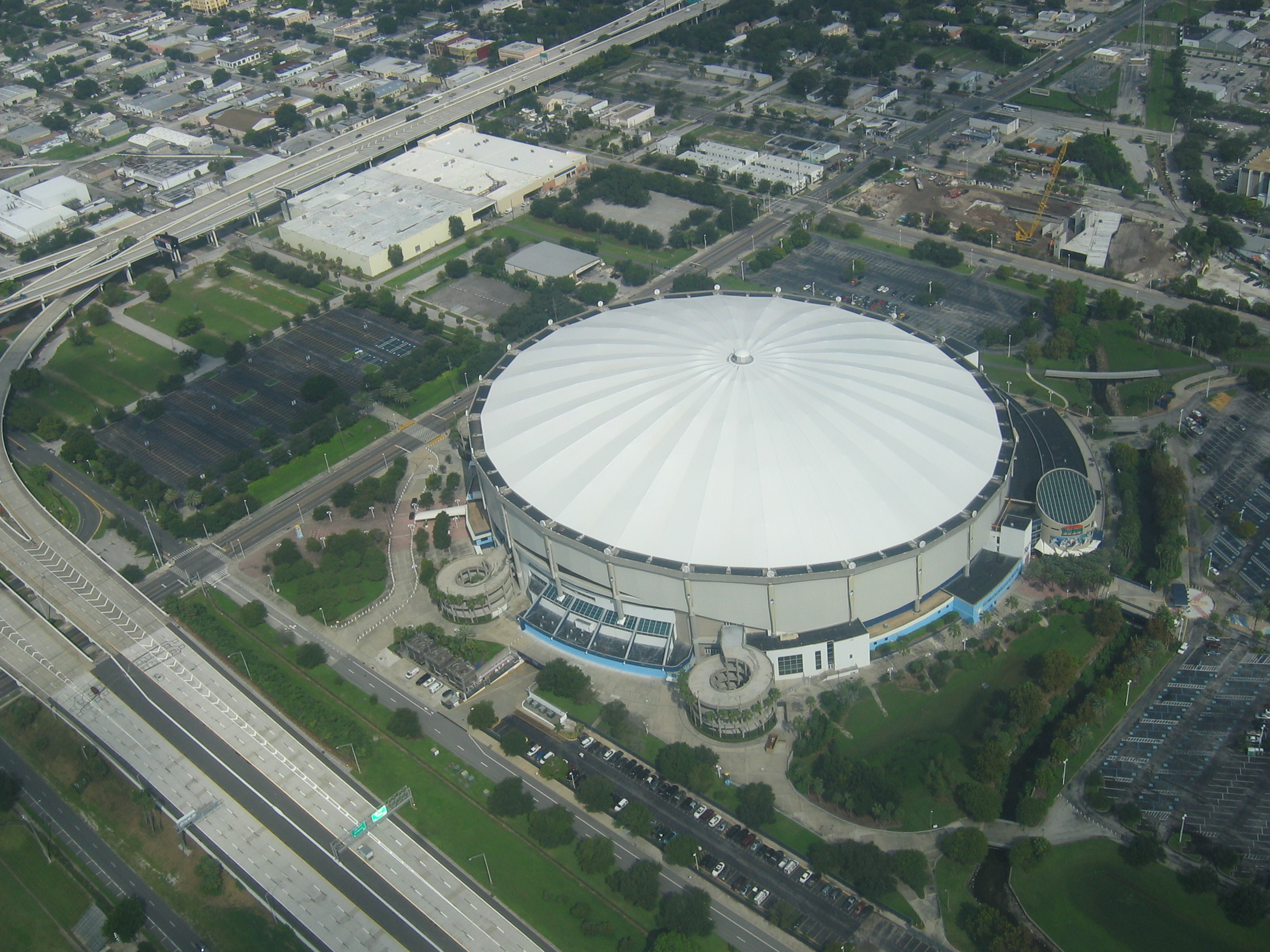
Tropicana Field from the air in 2009.

The first no-hitter pitched at Tropicana Field took place on June 25, 2010, thrown by Edwin Jackson of the Arizona Diamondbacks, who had been a member of the Rays from 2006 to 2008.

About one month after Jackson's no-hitter, on July 26, 2010, Tropicana Field was the site of the first no-hitter in Rays' history when pitcher Matt Garza achieved the feat. Garza faced the minimum 27 batters, as the only opponent to reach base (on a walk) was erased by a double play hit by the following batter.

On June 24, 2013, in a game against the Toronto Blue Jays, three Rays players – James Loney, Wil Myers, and Sam Fuld – hit consecutive home runs, a first at Tropicana Field.

Because of rioting in Baltimore, a series between the Rays and Baltimore Orioles in May 2015 was moved from Oriole Park at Camden Yards to Tropicana Field. The games were played with the Orioles serving as the home team and the Rays serving as the visiting team.

Due to severe flooding caused by Hurricane Harvey in the Houston area, the Houston Astros played one "home" series at Tropicana Field in August 2017 against the Texas Rangers, while the Rays were away on a previously scheduled road trip; the Rangers took two out of three games from the Astros. This was only the fourth time games were moved to a neutral location due to weather. Coincidentally, in advance of Hurricane Irma arriving in the Tampa Bay area two weeks later, the Rays' home series against the New York Yankees was moved to Citi Field, the home stadium of the Yankees' crosstown rivals, the New York Mets.

In July 2018, a proposal was unveiled to replace the facility with Ybor Stadium. Later that year at the MLB Winter Owners Meeting, though, Tampa Bay Rays owner Stuart Sternberg announced that the Ybor stadium plan would not go forward. The current stadium lease between the Rays and the City of St. Petersburg runs through 2027. The city granted the Rays until December 31, 2018, to continue negotiations with Hillsborough County officials. Although MLB Commissioner Rob Manfred has stated his support for "the ballpark effort and [his] desire to be [help] in assisting all parties in finding a way to keep the Rays in the Tampa-St. Petersburg area", he also went on to say that the Rays should "explore a path that is in the best interests of his club and Major League Baseball".

In addition, the relocation announcement sparked a flurry of redevelopment proposals submitted to the City of St. Petersburg. There are proposals to eliminate the structure completely, but efforts have been made to include the public in the debate using several community meetings.

For the 2019 season, Tropicana Field closed its upper decks, as part of efforts and renovations to "create a more intimate, entertaining and appealing experience for our fans". This reduced the stadium's capacity to around 25,000–the lowest in the league. The team's average attendance in the 2018 season was only just over 14,000. However, the tarps are removed for postseason games.

=== 2020s ===
From December 2020 to April 2021, the stadium hosted the professional wrestling promotion WWE, broadcasting its shows from a behind-closed-doors set called the WWE ThunderDome. Due to the start of the 2021 Tampa Bay Rays season, the promotion relocated to Yuengling Center in Tampa.

On January 26, 2021, seven different proposals to redevelop the Tropicana Field site were unveiled, some with and some without a new stadium.

The Gas Plant Stadium project was the latest proposal to replace Tropicana Field starting in the 2028 MLB season. This proposal was approved by both the city of St. Petersburg and Pinellas County commissioners, although construction had not started yet. The Rays and Hines planned to begin building the stadium in early 2025, and have it ready for Opening Day in 2028.

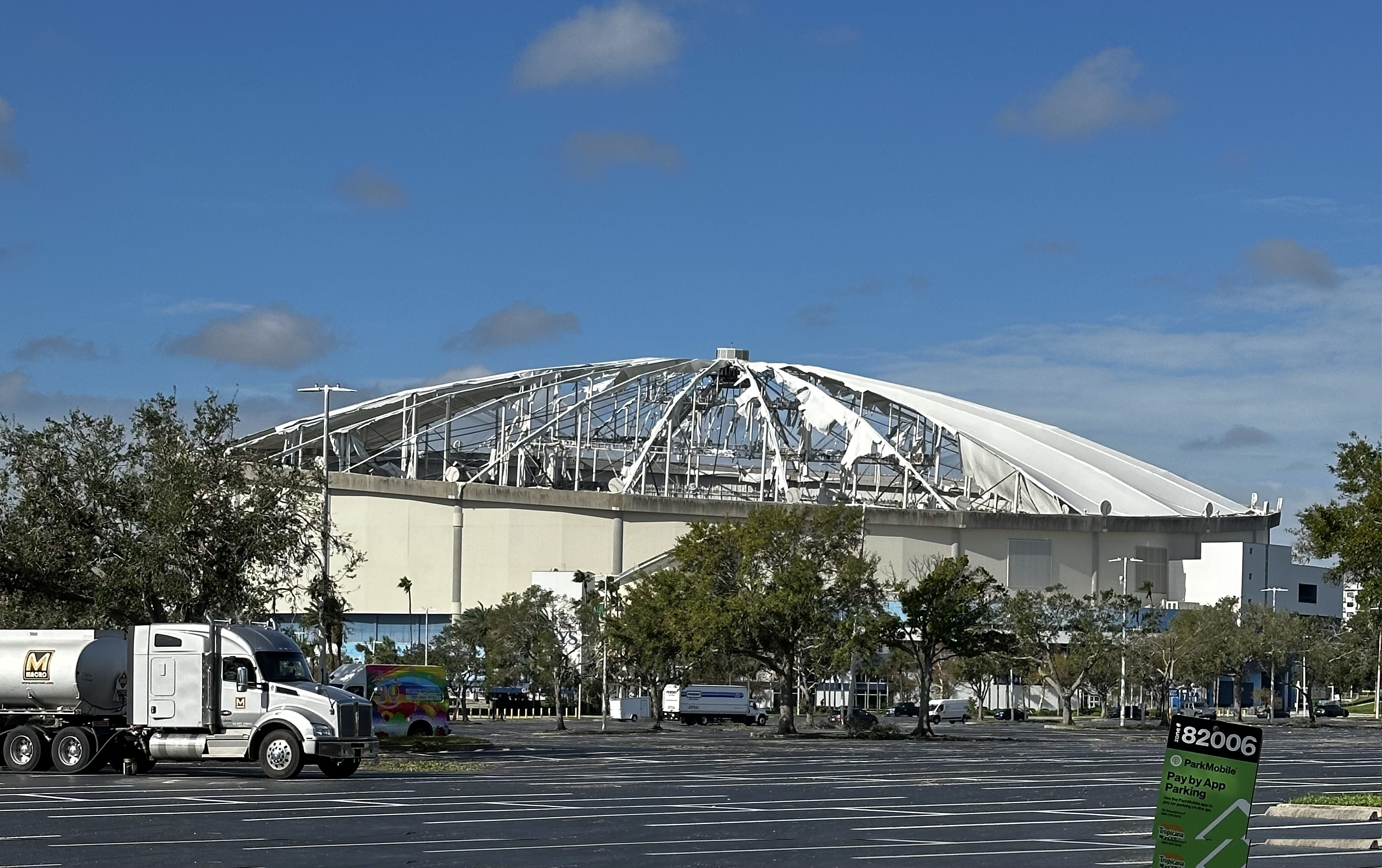
Damage to the Tropicana Field roof following Hurricane Milton in St. Petersburg, Florida

On October 9, 2024, while Hurricane Milton impacted the Tampa Bay region, strong winds tore through Tropicana Field's fiberglass roof. Video showed pieces of the roof flapping in the wind, growing until large sections of the roof were missing. The field level was hosting a base camp for first responders for before and after the storm; at the time the roof ripped, nobody was on the field, and the Rays clarified that the stadium was not being used as a shelter during the hurricane, as a planned precaution of that scenario. According to a principal engineer with the firm that installed the roof in 1990, it had outlasted its original service life by nearly a decade. On October 31, 2024, the St. Petersburg City Council voted on $6.5 million in remediation. A detailed assessment shows the stadium can be repaired for about $55 million and be ready in time for the 2026 season. On November 14, 2024, the Rays announced they would play all of their home games for the 2025 season at George M. Steinbrenner Field, a nearby stadium that serves as the spring-training home of the New York Yankees. On November 21, 2024, St. Petersburg initially voted 4–3 to spend $23 million to fix the roof of Tropicana Field, but later reversed course.

On January 27, 2025, St. Petersburg Mayor Ken Welch stated that Tropicana Field could be repaired in time for the 2026 baseball season. The Gas Plant Stadium project was ultimately cancelled in March 2025 with the team stating that they were considering a redevelopment of Tropicana Field with a long-term lease instead. The first game back at Tropicana Field took place on April 6, 2026 against the Chicago Cubs.

In August 2026, the city of Tampa and Hillsborough County each approved deals for Dale Mabry Stadium.

The September 27, 2026 game between the Chicago Cubs and Boston Red Sox was moved from Fenway Park to Tropicana Field due to a nor'easter affecting the Greater Boston area.

In October 2026, Tropicana Field hosted its second World Series against the Milwaukee Brewers, and was the place where the Brewers won their first World Series, beating Tampa Bay in 5 games.

== Design ==
=== Architectural ===
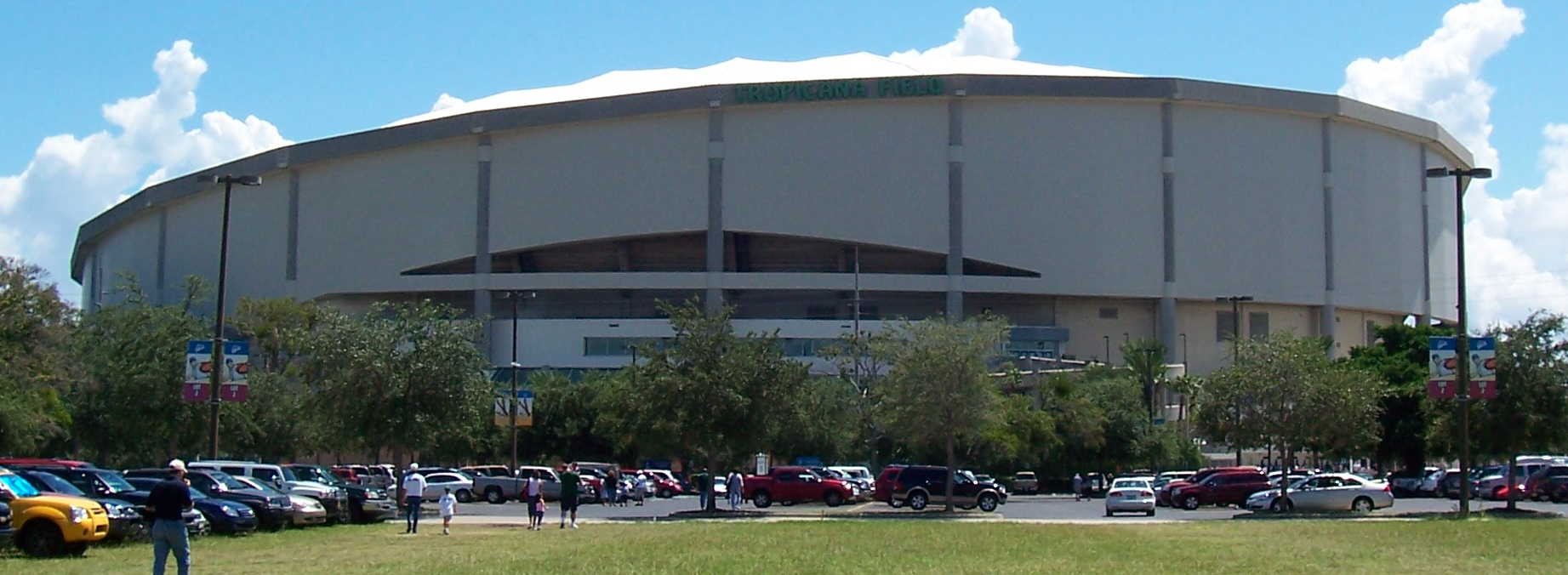
Tropicana Field has a unique slanted roof, which was largely destroyed by Hurricane Milton in 2024 and replaced before the start of the 2026 season.

The most recognizable exterior feature of Tropicana Field is the slanted roof. It was designed at an angle to reduce the interior volume to reduce cooling costs, and to better protect the stadium from hurricanes. The dome is supported by a tensegrity structure and is lit up with orange lights after the Rays win a home game. When the Minnesota Twins vacated the Hubert H. Humphrey Metrodome following the 2009 season and moved into Target Field in 2010, Tropicana Field became the only active MLB stadium with a fixed (i.e., not retractable) roof. The catwalks attached to the non-retractable roof have rarely, but occasionally, obstructed batted balls.

The main rotunda, on the east end of the stadium, resembles the Ebbets Field rotunda on the interior. The walkway to the main entrance of the park featured, until the 2020 season, a 900-foot (270 m) long ceramic tile mosaic, made of 1,849,091 1-square-inch (6.5 cm^{2}) tiles. It was the largest outdoor tile mosaic in Florida, and the fifth-largest in the United States. It was sponsored by Florida Power Corporation, which is now a part of Duke Energy.

The primary 100-level concourse is at street level, with elevators, escalators, and stairs separating the outfield and infield sections, since the ground is at different grades on either side. The 200-level loge box concourse is further separated, and is carpeted, as it includes the entrances to most of the luxury suites. The 300-level concourse is the highest of the concourses.

=== Gates ===
Seven gate entrances/exits to Tropicana Field exist, numbered in a clockwise fashion. Gate 1 is the main entrance, known as the Rotunda, on the right-field side of the stadium. Gate 4 is a VIP-only entrance, while Gate 7 is for stadium and team personnel only.

=== Dining and amenities ===
Rays Home Attendance at Tropicana Field
Season	Attendance	Avg./Game	Rank
1998	2,506,293	30,942	7th
1999	1,562,827	19,294	10th
2000	1,449,673	18,121	13th
2001	1,298,365	16,029	14th
2002	1,065,742	13,157	14th
2003	1,058,695	13,070	14th
2004	1,274,911	15,936	14th
2005	1,141,669	14,095	14th
2006	1,368,950	16,901	14th
2007	1,387,603	17,131	14th
2008	1,811,986	22,370	12th
2009	1,874,962	23,148	11th
2010	1,864,999	23,025	9th
2011	1,529,188	18,879	13th
2012	1,559,681	19,255	14th
2013	1,510,300	18,646	15th
2014	1,446,464	17,858	14th
2015	1,287,054	15,322	15th
2016	1,286,163	15,879	15th
2017	1,253,619	15,477	15th
2018	1,154,973	14,259	15th
2019	1,178,735	14,552	15th
2020	0	0	-
2021	761,072	9,396	14th
2022	1,128,127	13,927	14th
2023	1,440,301	17,781	13th
2024	1,337,739	16,515	14th

Seating at Tropicana Field is arranged with odd sections on the third-base side and even sections on the first-base side. The hallway behind sections 133–149 is nicknamed "Left Field Street". The hallway behind sections 136–150 is nicknamed "Right Field Street". The 100-level seating wraps around the entire field with a 360-degree walkway. Behind the stadium's batter's eye is a center field common area, known as the Porch, that provides fans with open seating and standing room to watch games. The Porch, along with other facility improvements, was part of a multimillion-dollar renovation project that was completed before the start of the 2014 season.

Loge boxes are featured along the infield of the 100-level from foul pole to foul pole; 200-level seating features 20 sections along the foul lines, broken by the press box behind home plate, with the luxury boxes directly behind and above them. The 300-level seating wraps around the infield along the lines, and also features the "Party Deck", a small-capacity seating area above the left-field outfield seats with separate concessions inside. Initially sponsored by tbt*, the Party Deck has been sponsored by GTE Financial since the 2019 season. Rows are lettered starting closest to home plate and rise further away. Seats are numbered starting at the left side of the section.

Of 70 luxury suites, 48 are accessible from the 200-level, while the other 15 are located on the 100-level.

In total, 2,776 club seats are available at Tropicana Field. The Dex Imaging Home Plate Club features its own entrance, recliner seats, and a premium buffet with in-seat service. The second club section, the Rays Club, is along the first-base side on the 100-level at the Loge Box level. It features its own premium buffet and premium seating.

The MacDillville section located on the right-field line, behind the Rays' bullpen, is reserved for the 24 tickets that the Rays provide to personnel returning from deployment, families of deployed personnel, and staff assigned to MacDill Air Force Base.

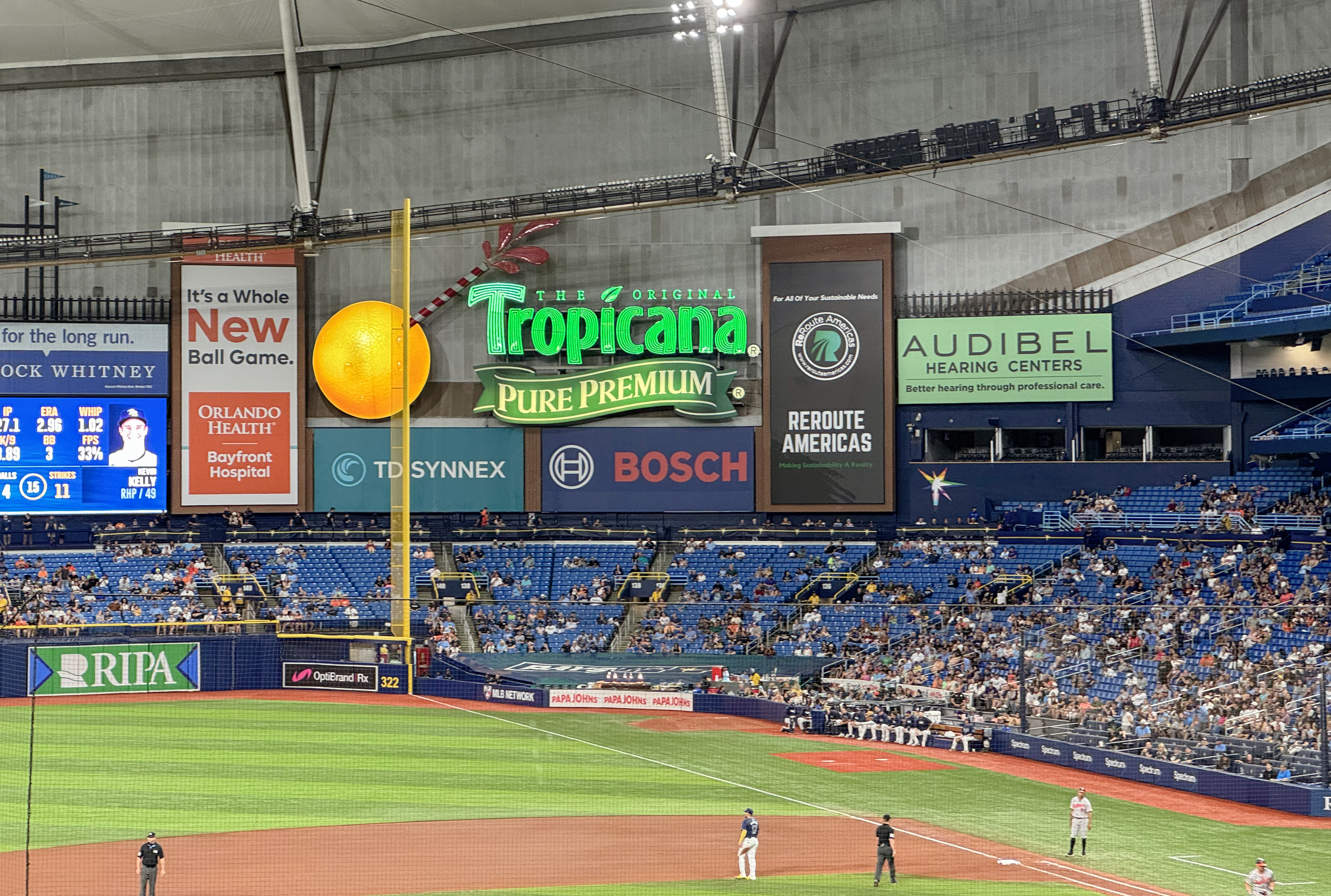
The Tropicana Pure Premium outfield sign

In 2006, field-level party sections were installed in the corners. The left-field party section is available for groups of 75-136 people and named "162 Landing", in reference to Evan Longoria's walk-off home run in the 162nd and final regular-season game of the 2011 season that landed in that section, which clinched the American League wild card for the Rays.

In 2017, the "162 Landing" section was renamed after a Tampa sports bar, "Ducky's", that is featured in the Porch and co-owned by Longoria; the Ducky's branding was removed following the trade of Longoria to the San Francisco Giants before the 2018 season, and 162 Landing has been sponsored by Hard Rock Café since the 2018 season.

The right-field party section, known as the "Papa John's Bullpen Box", is available for groups of 50–85. When the right-field corner was sponsored by the fast-food chain Checkers, tickets to the "Checkers Bullpen Cafe" included a free meal at the Checkers kiosk immediately adjacent to the section. As of 2008, both party sections featured all-you-can-eat buffets.

In 2019, the Rays introduced the "Left Field Ledge", a party section above the section of the 360 walkway behind left field, offering tables for groups of eight and patio boxes for groups of 12 to 24.

The St. Anthony's Fan Care Clinic is located between Gates 3 and 4 on the 100 level, section 102 (behind home plate). St. Anthony's Health Medical Team staffs the clinic and offers first aid services to fans.

A Baby Care Suite is located on the 300 level near section 300 and features baby-changing stations and private nursing suites.

One of the team's two main apparel stores is located in the stadium near Gate 1. The other main store, the Tampa Pro Shop and Ticket Outlet, is located in Tampa. Many smaller specialty stores are located throughout the stadium, including a "Game-Used Merchandise" store located in Center Field Street.

=== The Rays Cownose Clubhouse ===
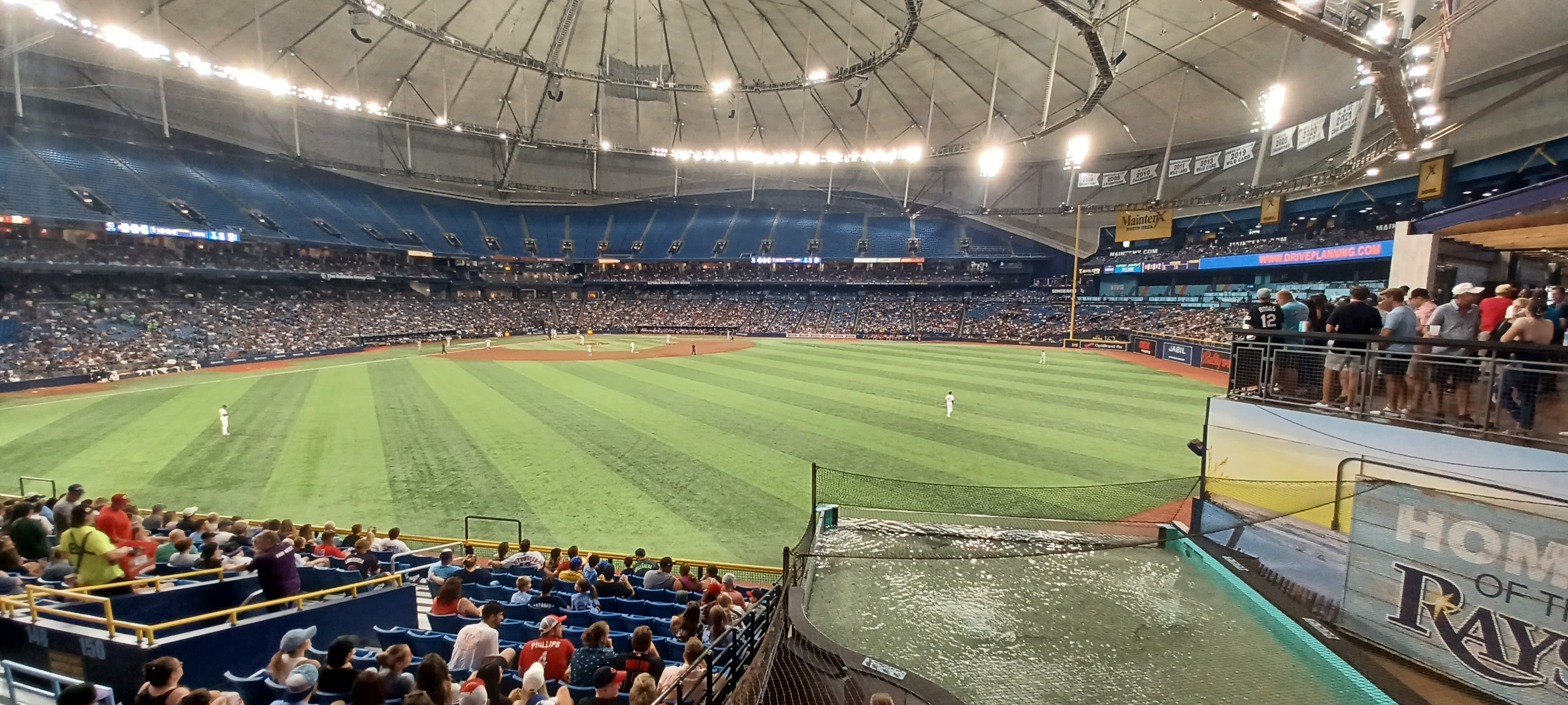
Overlooking the Rays Touch Tank and playing field during the 2024 season

Just over the right-center-field fence is the Cownose Clubhouse. This 35-foot (11 m), 10,000-US-gallon (38,000 L; 8,300 imp gal) tank is filled with three different species of rays, including cownose rays that were taken from Tampa Bay waters. The tank is one of the ten biggest in the nation.

Admission to the tank area is free for all fans attending home games, but a limit of 40 people are allowed in the area at any given time. The tank is open to fans about 20 minutes after the gates open, and closes to the public two hours after the first pitch. Fans get to see the rays up close and get to learn educational information about them.

The tank and rays are sponsored and maintained by the Florida Aquarium, where they have resided during the off-season, educating people about rays and other aquatic life.

In 2008, for every ball hit into the tank during a game by a Rays player, the Rays donated US$5,000 to charity, with half (i.e., US$2,500) going to the Florida Aquarium and the other half (US$2,500) going to that player's charity of choice.

As of the 2021 season, the netting over the tank was extended to fully enclose the area, removing the possibility of a home-run ball entering the tank.

==== Tank home runs ====
Prior to 2021, only two Rays players hit a home run that landed in the tank:

Touch Tank Home Runs
Hitter	Date	Charity
José Lobatón*	October 7, 2013	Tampa Children's Home
Brad Miller	July 31, 2016	Mikie Mahtook Foundation

* Denotes walk-off home run.

In addition, only five players hit home runs into the tank playing for opposing teams:

Hitter	Team	Date
Luis Gonzalez	Los Angeles Dodgers	June 24, 2007
Miguel Cabrera	Detroit Tigers	June 30, 2013
Nelson Cruz	Seattle Mariners	May 27, 2015
Robbie Grossman	Minnesota Twins	September 5, 2017
Kole Calhoun	Los Angeles Angels	August 1, 2018

=== Concessions ===
Behind center field on the stadium's ground level near the main rotunda entrance is a two-story, full-service restaurant and recreational area called BallPark & Rec, opened in 2018. The restaurant's second floor features an outdoor area with lawn games, and an indoor arcade area. This restaurant took over the location previously occupied by Everglades Brewhouse, which served several craft beers in addition to having a full liquor bar and opened two hours before first pitch. A "Fan vs. Food" challenge at Everglades was introduced in 2014, which consists of eating a 4-pound (1.8 kg) burger and a pound of French fries in under 30 minutes to win two future Rays game tickets and a T-shirt.

Various other concession stands are located behind center field and along the outer rim of the stadium along the base lines, collected in three concourses named Center Field Street, First Base Food Hall, and Third Base Food Hall. These stands frequently change from season to season, are often named after or maintained by stadium sponsors, or are themed after notable Rays figures, such as the Rocco Ball Deli, themed after former Rays player and coach Rocco Baldelli, which was open for the 2018 season until Baldelli was hired by the Minnesota Twins in 2019. Current and former concessions include Twisted, Melted, Pacific Counter, Haute Potato, Fiamma, Little Greek, Crabby's Beachside Bites, Colony Grill Pizza, a full service liquor bar, Bay Grill and the Craft Beer Corner featuring many local craft brewery's including Big Storm Brewing, Cigar City, Green Bench, Sea Dog and 3 Daughters. Green Bench Brewing offers a special edition brew just for the Rays called 2-Seam Blonde Ale.

In addition to these concessions, Tropicana Field previously hosted a concession stand for Outback Steakhouse, a Tampa Bay-based establishment. To compete with established stadiums' hot dog traditions, the Trop introduced the "Sting 'Em" Dog in 2007. This consists of a regular hot dog topped with chili and cheese. It was renamed "The Heater" in 2008.

== Transportation ==
=== Public transit ===
Public transit to Tropicana Field is provided by the Pinellas Suncoast Transit Authority (PSTA). It is served by the SunRunner bus rapid transit (BRT) service which has stops on the north side of the stadium. The stadium is also served by a number of local bus routes.

=== Parking ===
The park has several parking lots surrounding the stadium.

== Notable events ==
=== Basketball ===
In 1998, Tropicana Field was a regional final site for the NCAA men's basketball tournament. A year later, the stadium played host to the 1999 Final Four which had the Connecticut Huskies beat the Duke Blue Devils 77–74 for the championship. Subsequently, no other NCAA men's basketball game has yet been played at Tropicana Field.

=== Football ===
ArenaBowl IX was held at the venue in 1995.

In 2008, the NCAA announced that Tropicana Field would be host to a postseason college bowl game, bringing football to the dome. The game, which eventually took on the name Gasparilla Bowl, was played inside Tropicana Field until 2017, after which the bowl organizers moved the annual contest to Raymond James Stadium in Tampa.

The Trop returned to a football configuration on October 30, 2009, to host one of the three home games of the Florida Tuskers of the United Football League, in which the Rays had invested.

The East–West Shrine Game, a postseason college football all-star game played annually since 1925, was played at Tropicana Field from 2012 until 2019.

=== Hockey ===
Tropicana Field, then known as the ThunderDome, holds the record for the highest attendance for a Stanley Cup playoffs game, set on April 23, 1996, with 28,183 fans. At the time, this was the largest-ever crowd at an NHL game, which stood until the 2003 Heritage Classic. This still stands the attendance record for a game played at a team's regular home stadium, as all NHL games with a higher attendance were part of the NHL's Winter Classic, Heritage Classic, or Stadium Series.

=== Motorsports ===
The World of Outlaws Sprint Cars raced at the Suncoast Dome on February 7–9, 1992 as a part of Florida Speedweeks with several tracks hosting events during the month.

An SCCA Trans-Am Series race was held in 1996 and 1997 on a temporary course encompassing the parking lot and surrounding streets.

=== Concerts ===
Tropicana Field has hosted many concerts over the years; one of the first large events upon its completion was a concert by Don Henley on June 29, 1990. Many well-known artists have held concerts at the venue, including Eric Clapton (twice), David Bowie, Janet Jackson (twice), Steely Dan, AC/DC (twice), Guns N' Roses, Billy Joel (twice), Robert Plant, Rush (twice), R.E.M., the Eagles, Depeche Mode, Rod Stewart, Kiss, and Van Halen (twice), among others. The venue's largest concert attendance was for the boy band New Kids on the Block in August 1990.

The number of large concerts at Tropicana Field has decreased considerably since the (Devil) Rays were established in 1998, as the club's 81-game home schedule makes scheduling difficult, especially during the summer concert season. Also, the development in nearby Tampa of Benchmark International Arena (opened in 1996) and the MidFlorida Credit Union Amphitheatre (opened in 2004) into busy concert venues has further curtailed the concert slate at Tropicana Field.

==== Rays Summer Concert Series ====
Beginning in 2007, the Rays organized a "Summer Concert Series" in which a mix of major and lesser-known performers of many different musical genres performed after select home games for no extra charge beyond the price of the game ticket. The concerts were usually scheduled after Friday- or Saturday-night games, with more kid-oriented acts performing after Sunday-afternoon games. The usual procedure was for a portable stage to be rolled out onto centerfield immediately after the final out of the ballgame, with the music starting soon thereafter. For most shows, fans were allowed to come down onto the playing field to watch the performance up close.

The first after-baseball concert featured nostalgia act Sha Na Na in June 2007. The event was so successful that the Rays booked a series of shows for the following season, usually increasing attendance for those games. Participating artists have included The Beach Boys, Los Lobos, LL Cool J, Sister Hazel, Kacey Musgraves, The Jacksons, REO Speedwagon, ZZ Top, Weezer, Kenny Loggins, Avril Lavigne, Joan Jett, Jimmy Eat World, and The Wiggles, among many others, totaling over 80 shows in all.

In some seasons, the number of postgame concerts was as high as a dozen. The number dwindled to two in 2017, and before the 2018 season, the Rays announced that they would discontinue the concert series due to "stress on the artificial turf".

On April 27, 2023, the Rays announced that the Summer Concert Series would return to celebrate their 25th anniversary season. The first artist announced was AJR, who would perform after the Friday, May 19 game against the Milwaukee Brewers. The concert proved to be a success, and the team soon announced two more acts, Lee Brice on Friday, August 11, and the "I Love The 90's" Tour, featuring Vanilla Ice, Rob Base, Montell Jordan, and Tone Loc, on Friday, September 8.

Two postgame concerts occurred during the 2026 Tampa Bay Rays season. Country music artist Cole Swindell performed after the May 30, 2026 game against the Los Angeles Angels. The second performance featured Jordan Davis after the August 15 game against the Baltimore Orioles.

===== Tickets and Admission =====
Admission to Tampa Bay Rays Summer Concert Series performances is included with the purchase of a game ticket, however field access wristbands can be purchased in addition to the game ticket. Ticket availability, seating details, and concert announcements are generally released through the team's official website and seasonal promotional schedules.

=== Professional wrestling ===
On December 11, 2020, professional wrestling promotion WWE began broadcasting its weekly shows, Raw, SmackDown, and Main Event, and their associated pay-per-view (PPV) and livestreaming events from Tropicana Field in a residency. The programs were filmed behind closed doors due to the COVID-19 pandemic in a biosecure bubble called the WWE ThunderDome, which had been relocated from Orlando's Amway Center due to the start of the 2020–21 ECHL and NBA seasons, as the Amway Center is the shared home of the Orlando Solar Bears and the Orlando Magic.

Through the arrangement, Tropicana Field hosted the pay-per-views TLC: Tables, Ladders & Chairs, Royal Rumble, Elimination Chamber, and Fastlane—the final PPV before WrestleMania 37 (hosted by Raymond James Stadium in nearby Tampa)—as well as the 2021 WWE Hall of Fame induction ceremony, and WWE Superstar Spectacle (a WWE Network event produced primarily for the Indian market). As the 2021 MLB season approached, on March 24, 2021, WWE announced that the ThunderDome would be relocated to the Yuengling Center in Tampa, beginning with the April 12 episode of Raw, the night after WrestleMania 37. WWE's final show filmed at Tropicana Field was the April 9 episode of SmackDown, which was taped the week prior on April 2.

WWE would return to Tropicana Field for the 2024 Royal Rumble event, which set an attendance record of a reported 48,044 fans.

== Criticism ==
=== Location ===
Tropicana Field sits on 66 acres (27 ha) in the Midtown community of St. Petersburg, Florida. The land the stadium and its parking lots now occupy was occupied by the Gas Plant neighborhood from the late 1800s until 1986.

In the late 1800s, St. Petersburg began a large recruitment initiative to attract people to help build the city's infrastructures and fill lower-income service jobs. African Americans began to move to St. Petersburg from across the south looking to fill these jobs. The influx of African Americans in the area brought the formation of many black communities, including the Gas Plant district. The area housed nearly 800 people, many African-American-owned small businesses and three African-American churches. The district's name came from the two fuel tanks that originally stood where Tropicana Field now stands.

In 1979, the St. Petersburg City Council voted to refurbish the neighborhood, as it had "seen better days." This plan promised to create new, modern, affordable housing and an industrial park that would bring many new jobs to the area. By 1982, developers had offered no proposals for the refurbishment of the district to the city council, even after the council specifically requested the proposals. A group of Pinellas County business people offered a plan to the council that entailed building a baseball stadium, in hopes of attracting a major league team to the area. That year, the council voted unanimously to follow through with the baseball hopes and lease the land to the sports authority for $1 a year.

Most African Americans who used to live or work in the neighborhood felt betrayed by the city and bitter over the baseball development. The city had offered, and followed through with, many reparation programs for the residents and businesses of the Gas Plant district when the district was originally to be refurbished, including financial relocation help, but these programs were welcomed only on the basis that the area would be once again a functional community. When that stipulation changed, residents were angered and new reparation plans were rumored, but never came to fruition. As for the churches of the area, relocation offers extended to them from the City Council were "generous" according to one of the churches' pastors. This is believed to be because of the political power that the churches held.

The destruction of the Gas Plant district and the city's shortcomings in securing economic and employment opportunities for the displaced African American community have left a jagged relationship between city officials and the aforementioned African-American community. The destruction of the Gas Plant district financially crippled and killed many African-American-owned small businesses and is often referred to as the main reason that only 10% of St. Petersburg's small businesses are African-American-owned today.

The dome was built on the former site of a coal gasification plant, and, in 1987, hazardous chemicals were found in the soil around the construction site. The city spent millions of dollars to remove the chemicals from the area.

It is often criticized as being located away from the Tampa Bay area's largest population base in Tampa.

=== Catwalks ===
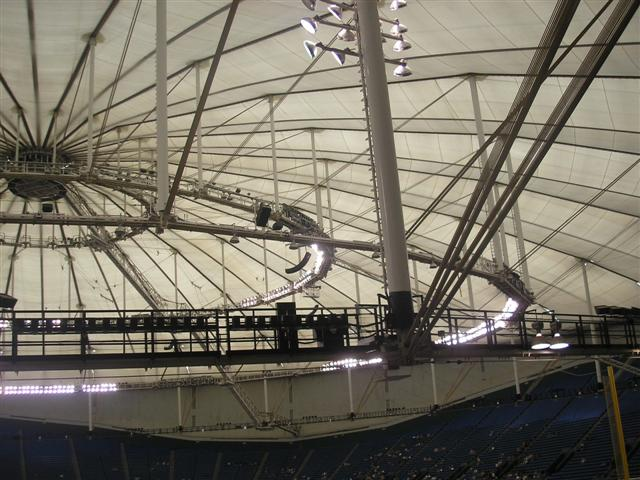
The catwalks at Tropicana Field

Among the most cited criticisms about the stadium are the four catwalks that hang from the ceiling. The catwalks are part of the dome's support structure. The stadium was built with cable-stayed technology similar to that of the defunct Georgia Dome. It also supports the lighting and speaker systems. Because the dome is tilted toward the outfield, the catwalks are lower in the outfield.

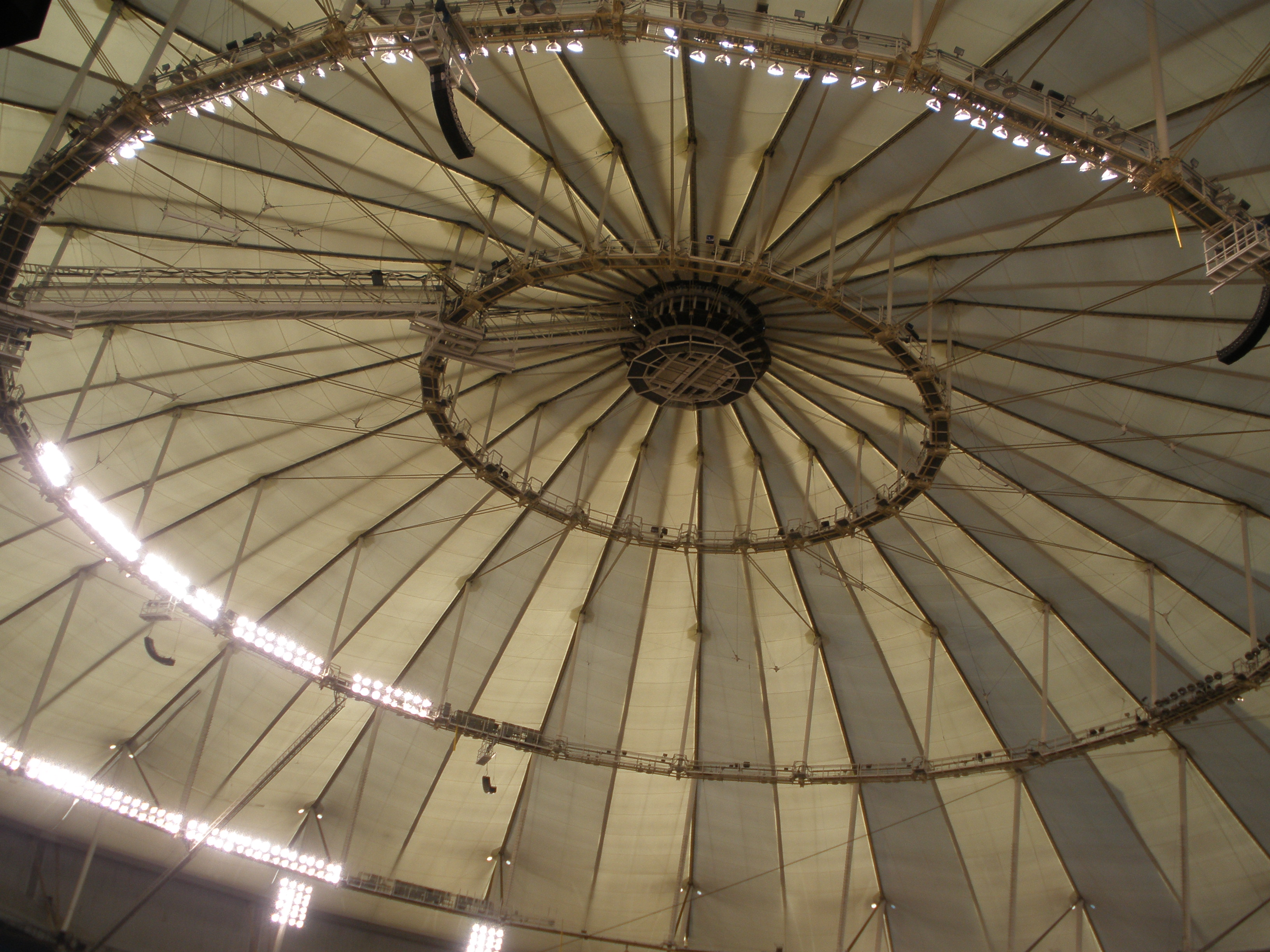
Close-up view of the A, B, and C rings

The catwalks are lettered, with the highest inner ring being the A Ring, out to the farthest and lowest, the D Ring. The A Ring is entirely in play, while the B, C, and D Rings have yellow posts bolted to them to delineate the relative position of the foul lines. Any ball touching the A Ring, or the in-play portion of the B Ring, can drop for a hit or be caught for an out. The C and D Rings are out of play; if they are struck between the foul poles, then the ball is ruled a home run.

On August 5, 2010, with the game tied 6–6 in the top of the 9th inning with two outs, Jason Kubel of the Minnesota Twins hit a sky-high infield pop-up that, if caught, would have sent the game into the bottom of the 9th inning. However, the ball struck the A ring and fell safely onto the infield, allowing the Twins to score the go-ahead run and extend the inning in a controversial 8–6 win. As a result, on October 4, 2010, Major League Baseball approved a change in the ground rules for the A and B rings, making it so that a batted ball striking either of the two rings was automatically ruled a dead ball, regardless of whether the ball strikes in fair or foul territory. The rules pertaining to the C and D rings remained the same. This change lasted for just the 2010 postseason.

Several potential hits, though, have been lost as a result of the catwalks. For example, on May 12, 2006, Devil Rays outfielder Jonny Gomes hit a long fly ball against the Toronto Blue Jays that seemed destined to be a home run before it hit the B ring, got stuck momentarily, and then rolled off and was caught by Toronto shortstop John McDonald as Gomes was headed for home plate. Although Rays manager Joe Maddon tried to argue that it should have been at least a ground rule double since it stayed in the B Ring for a while before coming loose, umpires eventually ruled against the Rays and called Gomes out.

On May 26, 2008, Carlos Peña hit a pop fly to center field that likely would have been caught by Texas Rangers center fielder Josh Hamilton. The ball instead hit the B ring catwalk and did not come down. Peña was mistakenly given a home run, but after deliberation, the umpires awarded him a ground rule double. This was the second time this had happened, as José Canseco hit a ball that stuck in the same catwalk on May 2, 1999.

Many players have hit the C and D rings for home runs. The first player to hit the rings for a home run was Edgar Martínez of the Seattle Mariners on May 29, 1998. Martinez's home run went off the D ring. Three players before him hit balls that went into the C ring, but at the time, balls hitting the C ring were not ruled home runs. Two days prior to Martinez's home run, the ground rules were changed so that if a ball hit the C ring, it would be called a home run. The first player to hit the rings for a home run in postseason play was Rays third baseman Evan Longoria, who hit the C ring off Javier Vázquez of the Chicago White Sox on October 2, 2008, in the second inning of game 1 of the 2008 American League Division Series.

On July 17, 2011, against the Red Sox, Rays batter Sean Rodriguez hit a high foul popup that shattered a lightbulb on a catwalk. Pieces of the broken bulb fell to the turf near the third-base coach's box. After a quick cleaning delay in which the Tropicana Field public address system played the theme to The Natural (a 1984 film that prominently features a hit baseball striking and shattering a stadium light fixture), the game resumed.

Another ceiling-related incident came in June 2018, when New York Yankees outfielder Clint Frazier's 9th-inning fly ball bounced off a speaker hanging from the B ring and was caught by Rays shortstop Adeiny Hechavarria for an out. Some suggest that the ball would have traveled far enough for a home run, which would have broken a 6–6 tie. The Rays won the game in extra innings with a walk-off home run.

On May 2, 2026, San Francisco Giants outfielder Heliot Ramos hit what appeared to be a two-run home run, only to fall into the glove of Rays outfielder Cedric Mullins. The Giants challenged the call, believing it to have hit one of the catwalks, but after replay review, crew chief Vic Carapazza announced there was no visible angle of the catwalks that could prove it, thereby upholding the call. The Giants continued to argue the decision, leading to pitching director Frank Anderson and starting pitcher Adrian Houser (who was not pitching that day) being ejected.

=== Bullpens ===
Despite originally being isolated from play, for most of their existence, the bullpens have been located along (and close to) the left and right field foul lines and no barriers separate them from the field of play. In fact, fly balls hit into the bullpens are in play. The bullpen players and the pitching mounds are obstacles for fielders chasing fly balls into the pens. Teams have to station a batboy behind the catchers in the bullpens to prevent them from being hit by foul balls from behind. This style of bullpen used to be common in the major leagues, but is currently in use only at Tropicana Field.

=== Interior ===
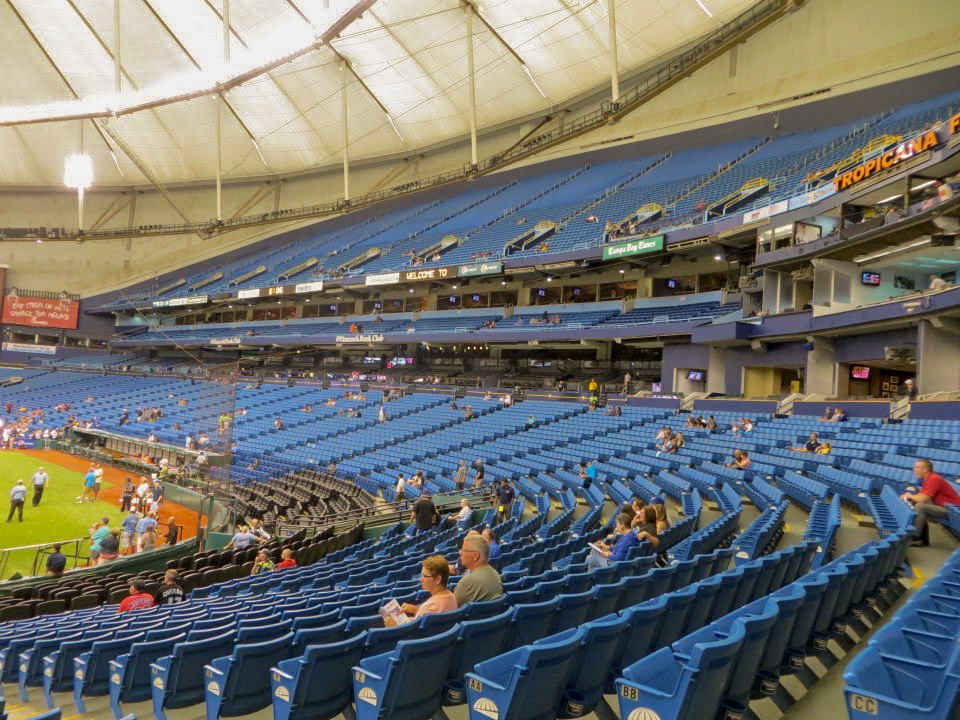
The main stands of Tropicana Field in St. Petersburg

Another criticism of the stadium is the drab interior environment, especially early in the (Devil) Rays' existence, when the stark concrete interior was compared to a large warehouse. However, since it was designed specifically for baseball, it is somewhat smaller and the sightlines are better than in most domed stadiums, which are often built to accommodate other sports, as well.

The Stuart Sternberg-led ownership group invested several million dollars over their stewardship to make the venue more fan friendly. New or improved features included a larger scoreboard, video wall, catwalk sleeves, an outfield touch-tank featuring cownose rays, a walk-around that circles the entire field, two concession and gathering areas in the outfield, and many other additions and upgrades designed to improve the fan experience.

== See also ==
- Raymond James Stadium, home of the Tampa Bay Buccaneers and the South Florida Bulls football team
- Rays Ballpark, a former proposed new stadium for the Tampa Bay Rays that has since been abandoned
- Rays Park at Carillon, a second former proposed stadium for the Tampa Bay Rays that was abandoned in mid-2015
- Gas Plant Stadium, an additional proposed stadium for the Tampa Bay Rays that has been proposed to occupy another portion of the Tropicana Field site that was abandoned
- Charlotte Sports Park, the spring training home of the Tampa Bay Rays, located in Port Charlotte, Florida
- Caesars Superdome, another stadium that had been damaged by a landfalling major hurricane while in use for operations surrounding the storm

== Notes ==
Events and tenants
Preceded by first ballpark	Home of the Tampa Bay Devil Rays/Rays; 1998–present	Succeeded by current
Preceded by first venue	Home of the Beef 'O' Brady's Bowl; 2008–2017	Succeeded by Raymond James Stadium
Preceded by Expo Hall	Home of the Tampa Bay Lightning; 1993–1996	Succeeded by Ice Palace
Preceded by Pittsburgh Civic Arena	Home of the Tampa Bay Storm; 1991–1996	Succeeded by Ice Palace
Preceded by Schleyerhalle; Stuttgart	Davis Cup; Final Venue; 1990	Succeeded by Palais des Sports de Gerland; Lyon
Preceded by Alamodome	NCAA Men's Division I Basketball Tournament; Finals Venue; 1999	Succeeded by RCA Dome
Preceded by Amway Center	Home of the WWE ThunderDome; 2020–2021	Succeeded by Yuengling Center
