= Rays Ballpark =

Proposed baseball stadium for St. Petersburg, Florida

- Location in Florida Location in the United States
- Location: 180 2nd Avenue SE; St. Petersburg, Florida 33701

Construction
- Cost: $450 million (estimate)
- Architect: Populous

Tenant
- Tampa Bay Rays (MLB)

Rays Ballpark was the name used in project documents for a ballpark in the current location of Al Lang Stadium on the Tampa Bay waterfront in downtown St. Petersburg, Florida, proposed by the Tampa Bay Rays as a replacement for Tropicana Field.

The Rays had hoped to complete the park in time for the 2012 season, but the proposal did not garner enough public support, and the project was abandoned.

== Design ==
Design concept

The Tampa Bay Rays have been working with Populous (formerly HOK Sport) on a design for a possible future ballpark since at least the beginning of 2007. The main design point of the proposed stadium was the "Mast and Arch" retractable roof. Instead of a solid material sliding roof panel, the "roof" would have been a fabric covering stored inside the shade to the seating. It was to be deployed by a pulley system at the top of the mast in six to eight minutes. It would have looked like a sail raising on a boat in the bay, or a circus tent being torn away by a stiff wind. The retractable-roof design would have been unique in baseball, looking like no ballpark built in this century or last.

The concourses in the proposed ballpark were similar to those at Pittsburgh's PNC Park, whereas they would have been enclosed and air conditioned and fronted with glass on the field side, allowing fans waiting for concessions to view the field. As part of the new stadium, Bayshore Drive, which currently runs along the east side of Al Lang Field, was to be closed during gameday activities, and become part of the ballpark. The ballpark would have faced the opposite direction of Al Lang Field, with centerfield on the north. In this configuration, it would be possible to hit home runs into the waters of Tampa Bay beyond the right field wall, similar to how home runs can be hit into San Francisco Bay at AT&T Park. This configuration would also have placed most of the fans in the shade of the grandstand as the sun sank into the west on summer afternoons, mitigated heat issues in the open-air facility. The open access to Tampa Bay from right field would also have provided a cooling breeze.

The original designs for the stadium called for up to 2.55 acres (10,300 m^{2}) of Tampa Bay to be filled in. By the time the stadium proposal was first made public, the landfill was reduced to 1.05 acres (4,200 m^{2}). In May 2008, the team revealed a new design calling for moving Bayshore Drive to a bridge structure, reducing the landfill requirement to 0.4 acres (1,600 m^{2}).

The plan website mentions that the simple act of moving from a dome to an open-air stadium could reduce the team's carbon footprint by up to 70%. However, the ABC group analyzing stadium needs for the Rays have said that any new stadium must have a fully retractable roof.

== Proposal ==
The design of the ballpark, as well as the redevelopment plan for Tropicana Field, was released on November 28, 2007.

On March 11, 2008, the Rays continued to move forward with plans for a downtown stadium by submitting a preliminary design consideration document to St. Petersburg officials. In addition, the organization announced that a detailed transportation and parking study had concluded that the Al Lang site in downtown St. Petersburg is well suited for the Rays' proposed waterfront ballpark.

Nearly 14,000 parking spaces that may be available for the majority of ballpark events were identified, a figure that does not include roughly 7,000 on-street parking spaces. Some of downtown's largest institutions have expressed an interest in working with the Rays to provide parking for ballpark patrons, including All Children's Hospital, Bayfront Medical Center, and the University of South Florida St. Petersburg.

== Financing ==
Rays owner Stuart Sternberg was to contribute as much as $150 million or one third of the cost. The team had also planned to seek Florida's 30-year, $60 million sales tax rebate for new sports venues. They also planned to fund the new park through the sale of redevelopment rights to Tropicana Field and the new property taxes generated from that redevelopment were projected to generate $800 million in new revenue. However, on January 7, 2008, the Rays announced they would be "temporarily abandoning" plans for seeking the subsidy. Using public funds in Florida to build a stadium may have proved to be too difficult; the Florida Marlins failed several times to get the sales tax rebate in their efforts to build the Miami Ballpark, and the state government anticipated heavy shortfalls in fiscal year 2009. Gov. Charlie Crist had announced that he would be interested in doing whatever he could to help the project reach fruition.

Because the land Al Lang Field sits on is city property, city voters would have to approve a new use for the land, a referendum that was expected to be on the November 2008 ballot. Then, to allow the city to forgo paying property taxes on the site (a loophole in Florida laws allows county governments to own stadiums tax-free), a long-term lease would have been signed by the Rays and Pinellas County would then take control of the site, a similar arrangement to that of Tropicana Field.

Rays ownership revealed the financing plan on May 16, 2008. Under this plan, in addition to the $150 million Stuart Sternberg was to provide, at least $70 million would have come from the sale of Tropicana Field. $100 million would have come from an extension of the one cent on the Pinellas County tourist development tax that was approved for Tropicana Field, which was to be extended 25 to 30 years. $75 million was to be redirected from the money the city of St. Petersburg currently pays on the debt owed for construction of Tropicana Field, with those payments extended 25 to 30 years; the debt on Tropicana Field would be assumed by the redevelopers, taking that burden off the city. The remaining $55 million would be from parking fee revenues, and guaranteed by Sternberg. Sternberg would pay any cost overruns.

== Work on approval ==
The first official public hearing on the park was held on February 22, 2008, before the St. Petersburg City Council. By that time, groups opposing and supporting the new stadium had already formed.

Proposals for the redevelopment of the Tropicana Field site were submitted to the City of St. Petersburg on March 18. Negotiations with Hines Construction and Archstone-Madison were begun for the redevelopment of Tropicana Field on May 1.

On June 13, St. Petersburg Mayor Rick Baker recommended that City Council accept the redevelopment bid made by Archstone-Madison, which offered $65 million for Tropicana Field. Their redevelopment plan involves building 755 condominiums, 1,935 apartment units, at least 600 hotel rooms, 800,000 sq ft (74,000 m^{2}). of office space, and 1.126 million square feet (104,600 m^{2}). of retail space. If approved by City Council and had the new stadium proposal passed, it would have been built in three phases, and completed in 10–13 years.

The first major hurdle for approval took place on June 5, when the St. Petersburg City Council voted 7–1 in favor of directing the City Attorney to draw up language for an approval referendum for the November 4, 2008, ballot.

== Cancellation ==
City and county leaders criticized the referendum plan as being "rushed." On June 25, 2008, in the face of mounting opposition, the Rays abandoned their attempts to get on the November ballot and postponed the project indefinitely. On May 22, 2009, the team announced that they had abandoned all plans for a ballpark on the St. Petersburg waterfront, preferring a location nearer the center of Pinellas County to the north. Rays senior vice president, Michael Kalt, said, "It's pretty clear people did not want a ballpark down there. From what we're seeing, we're probably in that camp, too."

The team also announced that a "community-based coalition," headed by Progress Energy President Jeff Lyash, will be evaluating alternate sites for the new ballpark in addition to the waterfront, and will be studying the team's fan base and corporate support. There is no publicly released timetable for proceeding with stadium plans.

Rays Park at Carillon
- "Carillon Park"
- Interactive map of Rays Park at Carillon
- Location: St. Petersburg, Florida, United States
- Coordinates: 27.8912°N 82.6613°W
- Capacity: 35,000

Construction
- Cost: $424 million– $577 million (estimate)
- Architect: CityScape

Tenant
- Tampa Bay Rays (MLB)

Derby Lane greyhound racing track and Toytown, a former landfill, were among seven suggested sites for a new Tampa Bay Rays ballpark. According to the St. Petersburg Times, there were environmental hazards at the Toytown landfill.

Among the possibilities was a 15-acre (61,000 m^{2}) site in the Carillon area. The Carillon location also had twice as many people within a 30-minute drive than either downtown St. Petersburg site, according to an internal report released by the Rays. Carillon Town Center would have provided potential for shared parking with adjacent development and excellent connectivity to the I-275 interstate corridor. This site also would have had potential for a rapid transit connection.

The Rays Park at Carillon was a proposed 35,000-seat baseball stadium that would have been built in Carillon area, located in northern St. Petersburg, Florida. The stadium was proposed by CityScape in 2012 for the Tampa Bay Rays as a replacement for Tropicana Field. The stadium was also the second major proposal for a Rays stadium since the Rays own waterfront ballpark proposal was abandoned in mid-2008. However the project was abandoned in mid-2015 after Cityscape announced the area would be used for a multi-use development area without the Rays stadium.

== Aftermath ==
St. Petersburg City Attorney John Wolfe has stated that the city, which has a lease agreement with the Rays through 2027, "would only approve a stadium project within the city of St. Petersburg." The "exclusive dealings" clause of the legal agreement forbids the Rays from negotiating to play in any stadium other than Tropicana Field. Any violation would result in "irreparable harm and damages" to the city of St. Petersburg.

St. Petersburg Mayor, Bill Foster, wrote the following to the Tampa Bay Times in August 2011: "At present, there is no plan by the city of St. Petersburg for the design and construction of a new baseball facility in Pinellas County, and no such discussions have occurred with the Rays since my becoming mayor. The city and the Rays are contractually obligated to Tropicana Field through 2027, and absent an addendum to this agreement, there can be no plan for a new facility...

"It should be no secret that the city of St. Petersburg has been preparing for any and all scenarios when dealing with the Rays and Major League Baseball," Foster continued. "With the investment of hundreds of millions of dollars by the people of St. Petersburg and Pinellas, and with 16 years remaining on our contract, one would be naive to believe that the city did not have a detailed plan to ensure that the Rays remain in St. Petersburg, or that the interests of our residents were being represented in earnest without regard to outside pressure from those who desire to subordinate the city's interest to those of the Rays or region."

"They need a new ballpark, there's no question," MLB Commissioner Bud Selig said while speaking to the Associated Press in April 2012. "I talked a lot to Stu Sternberg and he's talking to people. He and I have had many conversations, and we'll just monitor the situation. He's doing what he should do. He's there, he's talking to all parties trying to see what he can do." Selig's successor, Rob Manfred, has echoed similar sentiment about the situation as well.

In October 2014, it was reported that Sternberg, frustrated with efforts to build a new stadium in the Tampa Bay area, had discussions with Wall Street associates about moving the Rays to Montreal, which has been without an MLB franchise since the Montreal Expos moved to Washington, D.C., in 2005 to become the Washington Nationals. In January 2016, the city of St. Petersburg allowed the team to explore options for their new ballpark.

On July 10, 2018, the Rays announced they would vacate Tropicana Field and relocate to the proposed Ybor Stadium in Tampa before the start of the 2023 season. However, in December 2018, the project was cancelled.

On January 30, 2023, the Rays unveiled a new plan to build a ballpark near the site of Tropicana Field as part of a redevelopment project for the Gas Plant District, a majority Black neighborhood in St. Petersburg that was destroyed during construction of major highways, such as Interstate 275.

== See also ==
- Oakland Ballpark, proposed new stadium for the Oakland Athletics
