= Gas Plant Stadium =

Cancelled stadium proposal in St. Petersburg, Florida, US

- Rendering of the proposed stadium and surrounding area
- Interactive map of Gas Plant Stadium
- Location: St. Petersburg, Florida, U.S.
- Coordinates: 27°46′6″N 82°39′00″W
- Capacity: 30,000
- Surface: Artificial turf
- Acreage: 86

Construction
- Cost: $1.3 billion (estimate)
- Architect: Hines

Tenant
- Tampa Bay Rays (MLB)

Gas Plant Stadium was a proposed indoor ballpark in St. Petersburg, Florida. If constructed, it would have served as the home of the Tampa Bay Rays of Major League Baseball. The construction cost was estimated to be $1.3 billion and the total cost to public was to be $1.5 billion. This was the latest proposal for a new Tampa Bay Rays stadium, in addition to Ybor Stadium proposed in 2018 and Rays Ballpark proposed in 2008; the Rays have played in Tropicana Field since their inaugural season in 1998. In October 2024, Tropicana Field's roof was destroyed by Hurricane Milton. On March 13, 2025, the Rays announced that they would not pursue the stadium. On July 24, 2025, the city of St. Petersburg city council voted to officially terminate the project.

== Design ==
According to the official stadium project website, the ballpark proposal was intended to be integrated into a larger mixed-use development project. The proposed 30,000-seat ballpark would have brought fans much closer to the baselines, with a significantly decreased distance from the backstop to home plate.

The stadium design would have used a “front porch” design, which is meant to fit aesthetically into the area while paying homage to the bungalow-style houses in the Gas Plant neighborhood. Despite the proposal being the only fixed-roof ballpark in the MLB when completed, extensive use of windows and glass panels near the roof would have allowed for natural light in the stadium. Fans would have also entered the stadium at the main concourse level, where they could have walked down to roughly half of the seats in the lower bowl.

== Plan name history ==
The site is known as the Historic Gas Plant District, described by the city of St. Petersburg:

Nearly 40 years ago, members of the Historic Gas Plant community were displaced by the ultimately successful pursuit of Major League Baseball and the eventual construction of what is now Tropicana Field. While the move brought our city the Tampa Bay Rays, originally known as the Tampa Bay Devil Rays, residents and businesses were forced to relocate with the promise of jobs, opportunity, and equitable development, which did not materialize.

== Financing ==
The total proposed cost of the stadium was projected to be $1.3 billion. Funding sources would have included $287.5 million from the city of St. Petersburg, $312.5 million from Pinellas County, and the remaining funds (including any overages) from the team.

On November 19, 2024, the city of St. Petersburg and Pinellas County delayed the issuance of bonds related to stadium funding. In the previous month, Hurricane Milton damaged the Tropicana Field's dome, which made the Rays temporarily move to Hillsborough County. Both events cast doubt on the project.

On December 5, 2024, St. Petersburg City Council was in favor of purchasing bonds that would fund a portion of the new Rays stadium and the redevelopment of the Gas Plant District. The council voted four to three to move forward with a $290 million bond purchase to pay for a new stadium deal and the development of the land around it.

On December 17, 2024, the Pinellas County Commission approved paying for part of a new stadium with a 5-2 vote. The team would have been responsible for all cost overruns. The county committed to paying $312.5 million with hotel and short-term rental tax dollars that can only be spent to boost tourism. The Rays had until March 31, 2025, to meet certain benchmarks that would have unlocked the city's and county's funds for construction.

== Timeline ==
=== Initial promise ===
On September 19, 2023, the Tampa Bay Rays announced plans to build a new stadium adjacent to their current stadium, Tropicana Field. The proposal involved redeveloping the entire 86-acre (34.8 ha) site, with the new ballpark within that boundary and adjacent to the current ballpark, which will subsequently be demolished.

The construction was estimated at $1.3 billion, with the city of St. Petersburg and Pinellas County contributing $600 million through a bed tax (a six percent tax on accommodations on hotels and private homes rented for less than six months), and the team contributing the rest. Factoring in the cash, tax breaks, and discounted land being offered to Rays, the public cost of the project will be $1.5 billion.

Plans called for a 30,000-seat fixed-roof stadium, while the surrounding ballpark village would have included 4,800 residences and 1,200 affordable and workforce housing units; about 600 of the latter would be off-site. It would have had 1,400,000 square feet (130,064 m^{2}) of office space, 750,000 square feet (69,677 m^{2}) of retail space, a 100,000-square-foot (9,290 m^{2}) conference center, and a 750-room hotel, for a total of $6.5 billion. Unlike Tropicana Field, the stadium would have featured operable walls and windows that can be opened on pleasant days or closed to ward off Florida’s summer heat, rain, and humidity.

The development site was planned to encompass 8,000,000 sq ft (743,224 m^{2}) of development, including 48,000 residential units, 1,200 affordable/workforce units, 1,400,000 sq ft (130,064 m^{2}) office/medical space, 750,000 sq ft (69,677 m^{2}) of retail space, 750 hotel rooms, a 4,000 seat concert venue, 30,000 capacity ballpark, 100,000 sq ft (9,290 m^{2}) conference/meeting space, 50,000 sq ft (4,645 m^{2}) non-profit community space, 14 acres (5.7 ha) of parks/open space and 14,000 parking stalls.

On April 25, 2024, the development team released documents on the 65 acres (26.3 ha) of development surrounding the ballpark before the May 9 city council meeting.

On July 18, 2024, the St. Petersburg City Council approved a financing deal to build the stadium. After three hours of presentations and discussion, council members voted 5–3 to approve a dozen legally binding documents between the city, Pinellas County, the Rays and their development partner, Hines. They also swiftly approved issuing municipal bonds to help pay for the city’s share of stadium costs, $287.5 million, and for roads and sewers around it, another $142 million. The Rays will contribute $700 million to the stadium. They were responsible for all cost overruns on the stadium and infrastructure for the Historic Gas Plant District, as well as all insurance, maintenance and repairs to the stadium. The team would have kept all revenue from tickets and concessions, broadcasting, and naming rights.

On July 30, 2024, Pinellas County commissioners approved funding for a new ballpark. Commissioners voted 5–2 to put $312.5 million toward the design and building of a new ballpark. The money would have came from tourist development tax dollars, which the county can legally spend on a narrow range of projects meant to induce tourism, including sports venues. The Rays and Hines were planning to begin building the stadium in early 2025 and have it ready for Opening Day in 2028.

=== Plan demise ===
Hurricane Milton made landfall along Florida's Suncoast on October 9, 2024, and the impact from the storm (including significant damage to the roof of Tropicana Field) impacted the schedule of the project. The Rays would not play at Tropicana Field in 2025 due to this damage.

On November 19, 2024, it was reported that the stadium deal with Pinellas County was beginning to fall through due to a combination of the damage from Hurricanes Helene and Milton as well as the decision for the Rays to spend the 2025 season at George M. Steinbrenner Field across the bay in Tampa proper instead of a spring training stadium in the county. Stu Sternberg has warned that if the Rays are not able to get a new stadium, they may leave the Tampa Bay area. Later that day, it was confirmed that the vote for bonds funding the stadium would be delayed, thus suspending the project. Later that month, the Rays were informed that they had until December 1 to let Pinellas County know about if they were still interested in building the stadium in the county.

On November 30, 2024, the team stuck to the position that all agreements for the deal approved in July are still in effect until a party terminates them or deadlines are missed. In a letter to Pinellas County, the Rays stated, "the Rays 'would not have gone forward with the project if a future County Commission had the ability to revoke the approval celebrated in July or unilaterally delay the project’s completion into 2029.'"

On December 5, 2024, the St. Petersburg City Council was in favor of purchasing bonds that would fund a portion of the new Rays stadium and the redevelopment of the Gas Plant District. The council voted four to three to move forward with a $290 million bond purchase to pay for a new stadium deal and the development of the land around it.

On December 17, 2024, the Pinellas County Commission approved paying for part of a new stadium with a 5-2 vote. The team would be responsible for all cost overruns. The county committed to paying $312.5 million with hotel and short-term rental tax dollars that can only be spent to boost tourism. The Rays had until March 31, 2025 to meet certain benchmarks that would have unlocked the city’s and county’s funds for construction.

Into early 2025, local politicians and Rays ownership have cast doubt on the possibility of the stadium's inclusion as part of the larger Gas Plant development. On February 5, 2025 St Petersburg mayor Ken Welch stated “city council and the county commission have fulfilled all of the city and county obligations to date. If we still have a willing partner in the Rays — and we continue to have conversations with them — then we will move forward, and that is my clear preference.”

On February 13, 2025, Rays' team presidents Matt Silverman and Brian Auld accused Pinellas County commissioners of breaking an agreement to build a new $1.3 billion stadium by delaying a vote in October that was supposed to be a formality. “They effectively broke the deal and turned their back on the commitment they had made to us in August‚” Silverman said. “So everything that’s happened on the ballpark front since October has been a result of that failure, the County Commission’s failure to complete its approval.” With regards to financing, Silverman stated “Financially, we were really extending ourselves with this ballpark project. It wasn’t a question of having the dollars. We had the financing secure, but more question of, does this investment itself make sense in the context of Major League Baseball and fielding a competitive team for the next 30 years? We stretched because we really wanted to do this project for us and for St. Pete and for Tampa Bay, but when that timeline slipped and when the cost went up, and really when we lost the support of our partners at the city and the county, when they said to us, not one more cent after they didn’t uphold their end of the timeline, that’s when the reality started sinking in.”

On February 20, 2025, Pinellas County Commissioner Chris Latvala publicly responded to the Rays team leaders for asserting the county has killed an agreement to build a new baseball stadium. Commissioner Chris Latvala said Tampa Bay Rays presidents Matt Silverman and Brian Auld needed to “get over themselves” for comments they made in a team-sponsored sports radio show that aired previously. The Rays have said they are facing a budget shortfall of $150 million because of the delay, but a consultant for Pinellas County said that was impossible. The Rays have yet to publicly say how much money they need to proceed. “They are literally lying to our residents,” Latvala said. “I welcome them to come to a meeting and show us that they have a $150 million shortfall that was the cause of a 21-day delay.” Latvala said the Rays are trying to profit off of the hurricanes and “should be ashamed” for it. Latvala continued “Brian, Matt, and Stu need to be reminded that the hurricane did not just hit the Trop. It hit a bunch of other folks, and folks that are not millionaires and billionaires.”

=== End of the project ===
On March 9, 2025, The Athletic reported that MLB commissioner Rob Manfred was pressuring Rays owner Stu Sternberg to sell the team due to Sternberg considering canceling the stadium deal. On March 13 Sternberg announced that the team will no longer pursue the stadium deal. "After careful deliberation, we have concluded we cannot move forward with the new ballpark and development project at this moment. A series of events beginning in October that no one could have anticipated led to this difficult decision" Sternberg stated in a post on X. The Rays instead stated that they were considering redeveloping Tropicana Field with a plan to stay long term at the stadium.

Per the deal conditions, the path to this specific stadium was automatically terminated as of April 1, 2025. The deal remained in effect until either the Rays sent a termination letter or the March 31 deadline passed. The council approved a dozen contracts outlining the stadium and Gas Plant terms in July. In addition, the accompanying sale of 65 acres of public land to the Rays and development partner Hines in exchange for a $50 million community benefits package was no longer in effect. The team non-relocation agreement that would lock the Rays in St. Petersburg for another 30 years also was canceled; the Rays were now free to negotiate with other cities in Tampa Bay or elsewhere to play home games after 2028, or whenever the current agreement expires.

On July 24, 2025 the city of St. Petersburg city council voted to officially terminate the project.

While discussing redevelopment of the Tropicana Field property, a new version of a stadium on this site has been renewed. An updated rendering has been proposed that may or may not include a stadium for the Rays.
