= Ballpark =

Sports venue type

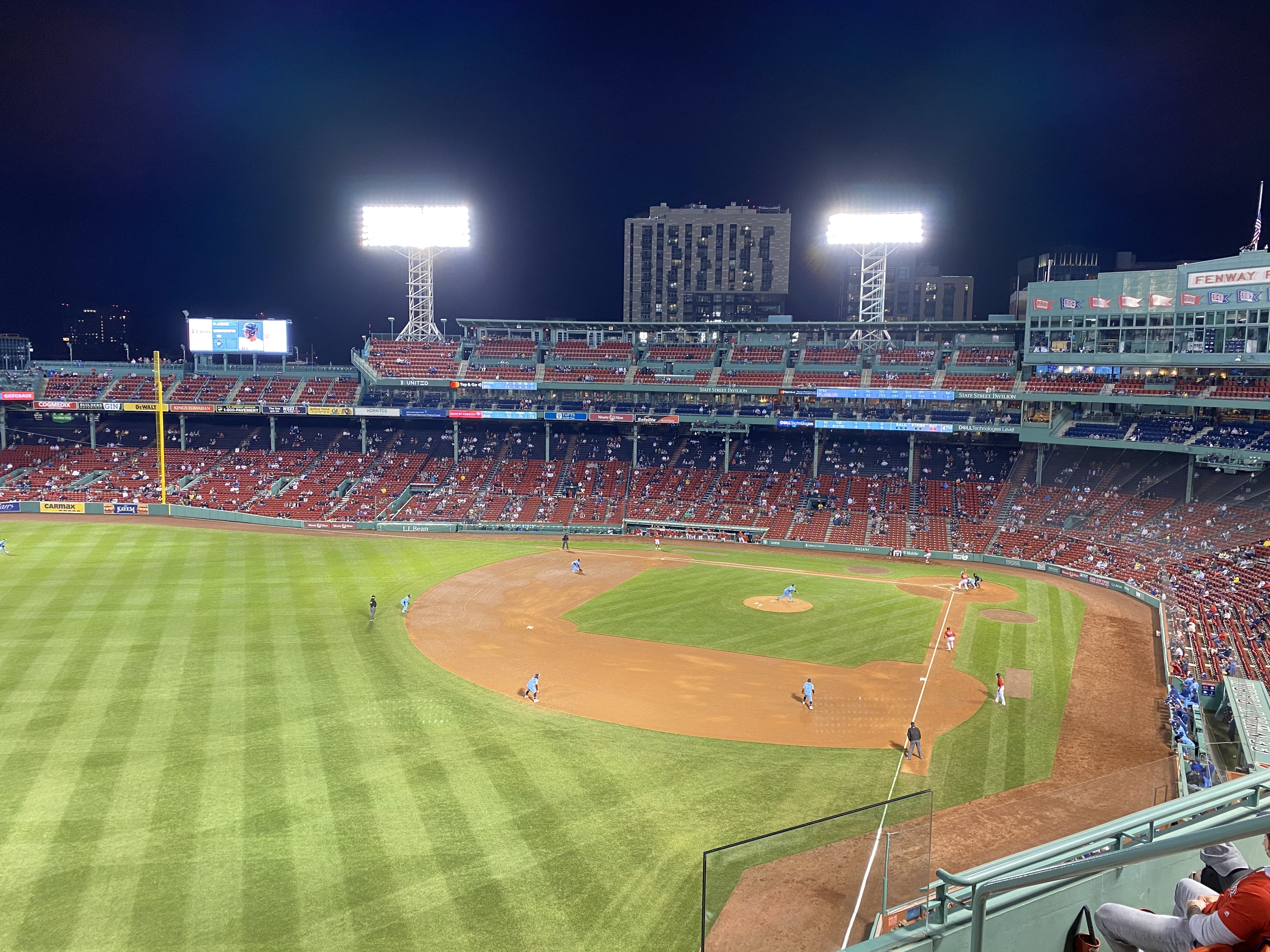
Fenway Park, home of the Boston Red Sox and the oldest ballpark in Major League Baseball

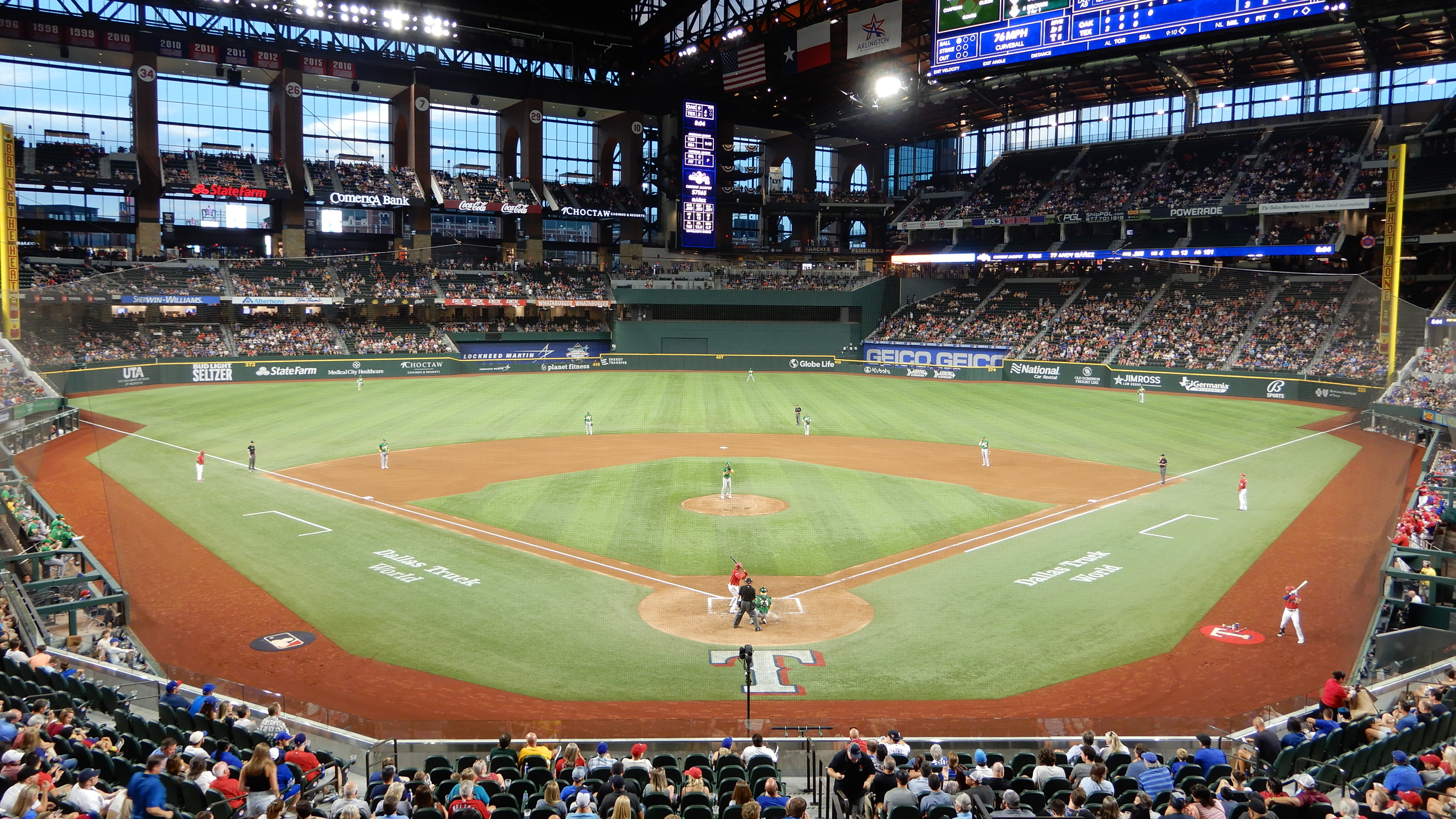
Globe Life Field, home of the Texas Rangers and the newest ballpark in Major League Baseball

A ballpark, or baseball park, is a type of sports venue where baseball is played. The playing field is divided into two field sections called the infield and the outfield. The infield is an area whose dimensions are rigidly defined in part based on the placement of bases, and the outfield is where dimensions can vary widely from ballpark to ballpark. A larger ballpark may also be called a baseball stadium because it shares characteristics of other stadiums.

== General characteristics ==
=== The playing field ===
Diagram of a baseball field

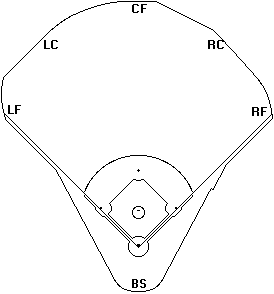
Diagram of a baseball field with outfield and foul zone

A baseball field can be referred to as a diamond. The infield is a rigidly structured diamond of dirt and grass containing the three bases, home plate, and the pitcher's mound. The space between the bases and home is normally a grass surface, save for the dirt mound in the center. Some ballparks have grass or artificial turf between the bases, and dirt only around the bases and pitcher's mound. Others, such as Koshien Stadium in Hyōgo Prefecture, Japan, have an infield of entirely dirt.

Two white lines extend from the home plate area, aligned with the first and third bases. These are the foul lines or base lines, usually differentiated by referring to them as the first base line, or the third base line. If a ball hit by the batter lands outside of the space between these two lines or rolls out of this space before reaching first or third base, the ball is "foul" (meaning it is dead and the play is over). If it lands between or on the lines, it is "fair". At the end of the lines are two foul poles, which help the umpires judge whether a ball is fair or foul. These "foul poles" are actually in fair territory, so a ball that hits them on the fly is a home run (if hit on the bounce, it is instead an automatic double).

On either side of home plate are the two batter's boxes (left-handed and right-handed.) This is where the batter stands when at bat. Behind home is the catcher's box, where the catcher and the home plate umpire stand.

Next to the first and third base are two coaches' boxes, where the first and third base coaches guide the baserunners, generally with gestures or shouts. As the baserunner faces away from the outfield when running from second base to third, they cannot see where the ball is and must look to the third base coach on whether to run, stop, or slide.

Farther from the infield on either side are the dugouts, where the teams and coaches sit when they're not on the field. They are named such because, at the professional levels, this seating is below the level of the playing field to not block the view from prime spectator seating locations. In amateur parks, the dugouts may be above-ground wooden or CMU structures with seating inside, or simply benches behind a chain-link fence.

Beyond the infield and between the foul lines is a large grass outfield, generally twice the depth of the infield. The playing field is bordered by fences of varying heights. The infield fences are in foul territory, and a ball hit over them is not a home run; consequently, they are often lower than the outfield fences to provide a better view for spectators. Sometimes, the outfield fence is made higher in certain areas to compensate for close proximity to the batter.

In many parks, the field is surrounded by an area roughly 10 feet (3.0 m) wide made of dirt or rubberized track surface called a "warning track". In the 1937 refurbishment of the original Yankee Stadium, a running track that ran the perimeter of the field was incorporated into the field of play as the first warning track. MLB formalized the warning track as a requirement in 1949.

Beyond the outfield fence in professional parks is an area called the batter's eye. To ensure the batter can see the white ball, the batter's eye contains no seating and is darker in color. The batter's eye area can be anything from a dark wall to a grassy slope.

Most major league ballparks are oriented with the central axis (home plate through second base through center field) of the playing field running toward the north or east or some direction between. Major League Baseball Rule 1.04 states that it is "desirable" (but not required) that the central axis run east-northeast (about 22 degrees north of east). This is to prevent the setting sun from being in the batter's eyes. In practice, major league parks vary up to about 90 degrees from east-northeast in either direction, but none face west, except for a few which are oriented just slightly west of straight north. (Left-handed pitchers are called "southpaws", and indeed the pitcher's left hand is toward the south in the usual park layout, and this has often been cited as the source of the appellation. But this is most likely a false etymology, or partly so, as "southpaw" for left-handers has been in use since at least the mid 19th century, and applied to boxers.)

=== Seating ===
Today, in Major League Baseball, a multi-tiered seating area, a grandstand, surrounds the infield. How far this seating extends down the baselines or around the foul poles varies from park to park. In minor league parks, the grandstands are notably smaller, proportional to expected sizes of crowds compared with the major leagues.

The seating beyond the outfield fence generally differs from the grandstand, though some multi-purpose or jewel box parks have the grandstand surround the entire field. This area could contain inexpensive bleacher seats, smaller grandstands, or simply inclined seating. In local ballparks, there are often simply a set or two of aluminum bleachers on the first-base and third-base sides.

=== Variations ===
Distinctive from "goal games" such as football and basketball, which have fixed-size playing areas, the infield is the only rigidly laid-out part of the field. Like its English relative, cricket, there is significant flexibility in the shape and size of the rest of the playing area.

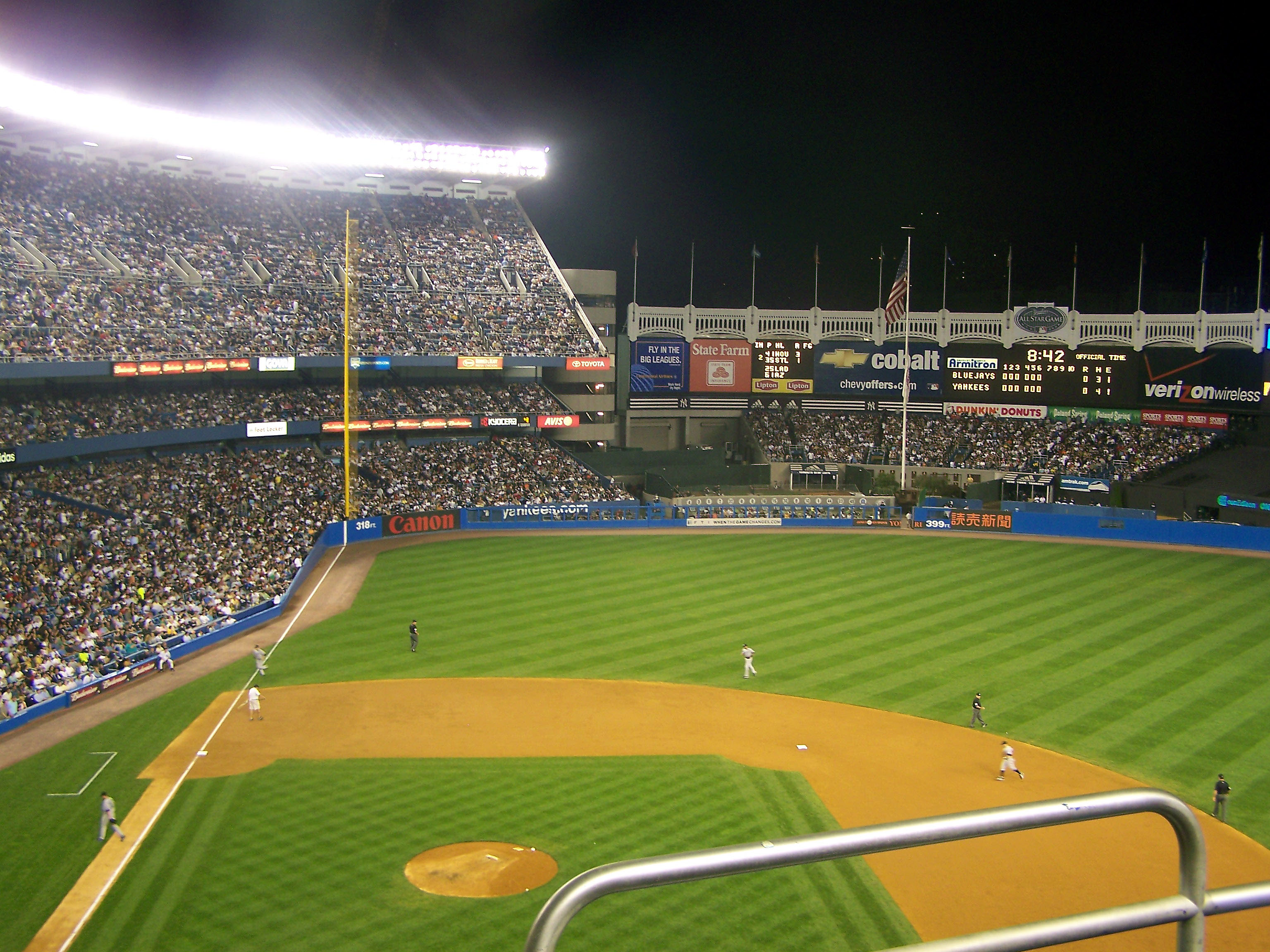
Picture of old Yankee Stadium showing its left field fence, which was famous for being farther than the right

Baseball leagues may specify a minimum distance from home plate to the outfield fences. Generally, the higher the skill level, the deeper the minimum dimensions must be, to prevent an excess of home runs. In the major leagues, a rule was passed in 1958 that compelled any new fields built after that point to have a minimum distance of 325 feet (99 m) from home plate to the fences in left and right field, and 400 feet (120 m) to center. (Rule 1.04, Note(a)). This rule was passed to avoid situations like the Los Angeles Coliseum, which was 251 ft (77 m). down the left field line.

However, with the opening of Baltimore's Camden Yards (1992), the "minimum distance" rule began to be ignored. One factor may be that the quaint, "retro" look of Camden Yards, with its irregular measurements, proved to be very popular, along with a traditionalist backlash against the symmetrical, multi-purpose, "cookie-cutter" stadiums. Since the opening of Camden Yards, many other "retro" stadiums have been built, each with asymmetrical fences. These distances vary from park to park, and can even change drastically in the same park. One of the most famous examples is the original Yankee Stadium, whose odd-shaped plot of land caused right field to be over 100 feet (30 m) shorter than left, although this difference lessened over time. The rectangular Polo Grounds had extremely short distance down the lines, 258 ft (79 m). to right and 280 ft (85 m). to left. In contrast, the deepest part of center field was nearly 500 ft (150 m). from home plate.

Older ballparks, such as Fenway Park, were grandfathered in and allowed to keep their original dimensions. Also, new parks have sometimes received special dispensation to deviate from these rules. For instance, the second Yankee Stadium, built 2009, used the same dimensions as the original Yankee Stadium.

The heights of the fences can also vary greatly, the most famous example being the 37-foot (11 m)-high Green Monster in Fenway Park's left field. Such tall fences are often used to stop easy home runs in a section of the ballpark where the distances from home are shorter, or where there is little space between the field and the street beyond. Some in-play scoreboards and high fences reached 50 to 60 feet (18 m), whereas a few outfields were even lined with hedges rather than normal fences or walls. The Hubert H. Humphrey Metrodome, when set up for baseball, had a 23-foot (7.0 m) right field "fence" that was actually a relatively thin blue plastic sheet covering folded up football seats. It was often called a "baggie" or "Hefty bag".

Some ballparks have irregularly shaped fences. Ballparks may have round swooping fences or rigidly angled fences, or possibly a significant change in direction or irregular angle. For example, the center field stands and the left field stands at Fenway Park meet at an uneven angle, creating an indentation (called "the triangle") that angles sharply back into the stands. In Citi Field and Oracle Park, part of the right field fence juts unevenly into the outfield as if the builders were trying to create an unpredictable ricochet effect for balls hit against it. Some "retro" parks, such as Globe Life Park in Arlington, throw in a sudden and small inward turn (often referred to as a jog) just to give a little quirkiness to the design. Milwaukee's Miller Park was designed, with the help of former player Robin Yount, to promote extra base hits.

Originally (mostly in the old jewel box parks) these variations resulted from the shape of the property where the park was constructed. If there was a street beyond left field, the distance to the left field fence would be shorter, and if the distance was too short, the fence would be higher. For example, in the old Griffith Stadium in Washington, D.C., part of center field had to be built around a cluster of apartment houses and the result was a rather large angular indentation in the left-center field fence. Now, these variations are mostly influenced by the specifications and whims of the designers. New "retro" parks, which try to recapture the feel of the jewel box parks, are often designed to have these quirks.

== Etymology ==
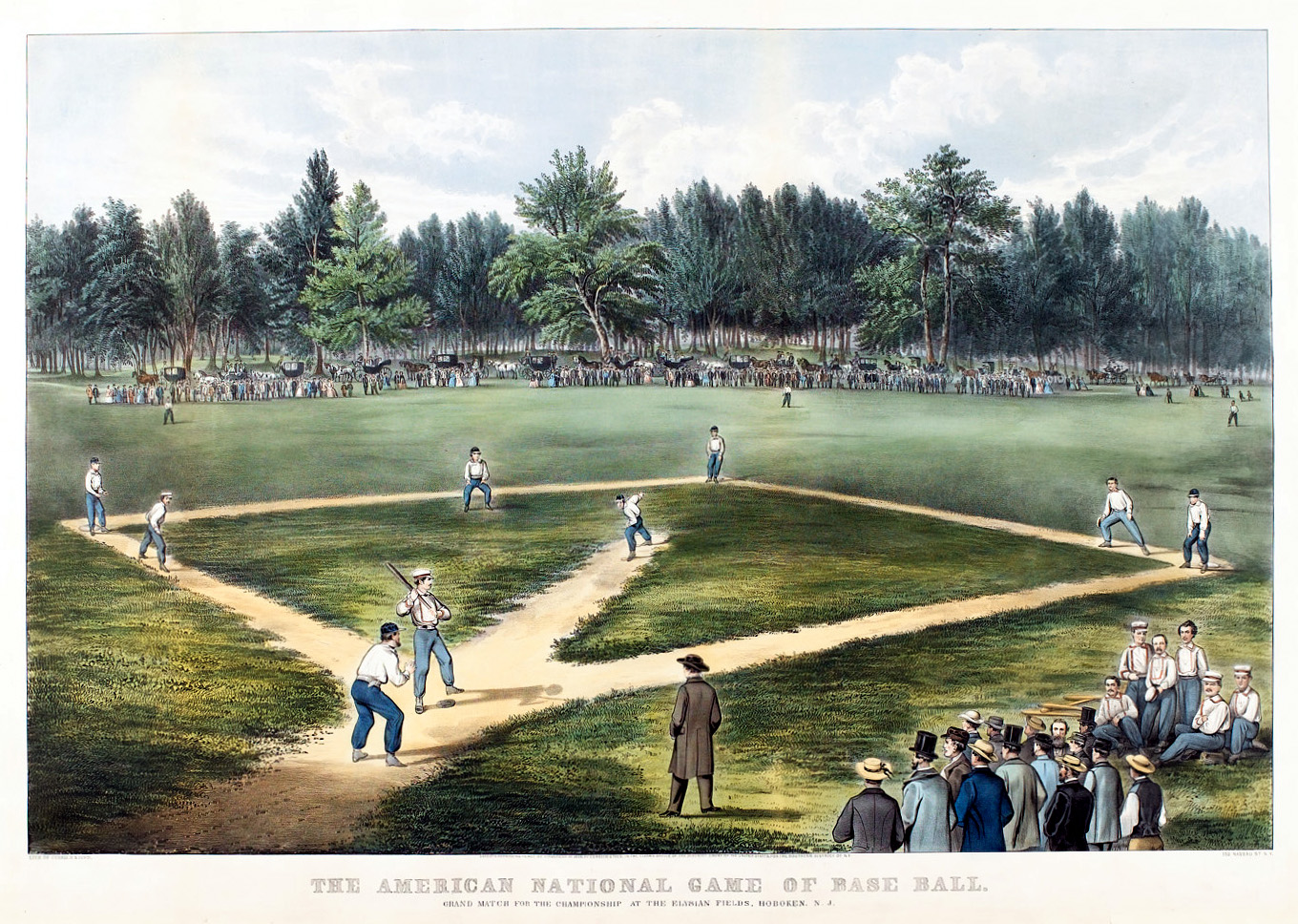
Elysian Fields

Baseball was originally played in open fields or public parks. The genesis of modern baseball is conventionally connected with Elysian Fields in Hoboken, New Jersey, a large public park where the businessmen of New York City gathered from time to time to play organized baseball games and cricket matches, starting around the mid-1840s. The name "Field" or "Park" was typically attached to the names of the early ballparks.

With the beginnings of professional baseball, the ballfield became part of a complex including fixed spectator seating areas, and an enclosure to restrict access to paying customers, as with a fairgrounds. The name "Grounds" began to be attached to ballparks, starting with the Union Grounds in 1862. The suffixes "Field" and "Park" were still used, but many professional ballparks were "Grounds". The last major league "Grounds" was the Polo Grounds in New York City, which was razed in 1964.

The term "stadium" has been used since ancient times, typically for a running track and its seating area. As college football gained in popularity, the smaller college playing fields and running tracks (which also frequently had the suffix "Field") gave way to large stadiums, many of them built during the sport's "boom" of the 1920s. Major league baseball enjoyed a similar boom. One of the first major league ballparks to be called a "stadium" was actually the Polo Grounds, which was temporarily renamed Brush Stadium from its reconstruction in 1911 until the death of owner John T. Brush in the 1920s. By then, the most famous baseball "stadium" of them all had been constructed: Yankee Stadium. From that point until the retro building boom of the 1990s, the suffix "Stadium" was used for almost every new major league venue, and was sometimes applied to the old ones, such as Shibe Park, which was renamed Connie Mack Stadium in 1954.

The suffix "Dome" was also used for the indoor stadiums constructed from the 1960s onward. The official names of those arenas also often included the word "Stadium", such as the Houston Astrodome, whose formal name was "Harris County Domed Stadium" in 1965; the Kingdome, whose formal name was "King County Domed Stadium", and the Metrodome, for which the Minneapolis highway signs directed the driver to "Metrodome Stadium". The retro era of the 1990s and early 2000s saw some venues return to using "park" in a stadium's name, even in domed structures such as T-Mobile Park and American Family Field (which opened with the name Miller Park).

There is little consistency in the choice between "Field" and "Park". For example, Houston's Daikin Park was originally named "Enron Field".

== Settings ==
Seating area design of stadiums is affected by many variables, including required capacity, audience access, and road traffic. Early ballparks like Elysian Fields were a far distance from the city center. Each game was an event, and fans traveled by public transit to watch the game.

With the growth of professional leagues, and consequent growth in the quantity of games, each game became less of an event, and fan convenience became more important. Many professional ballparks were built either near the city center, or in working-class neighborhoods, based on the expected economic level of the average fan. Consequently, the classic ballparks typically had little space for automobiles, as it was expected that most fans would take mass transit to the games, a situation that still prevails at Boston's Fenway Park and Chicago's Wrigley Field, for example. Some early ballparks, such as Brooklyn's Eastern Park, were abandoned because the trolley lines did not go out far enough and the team was not performing well enough for people to tolerate the inconvenience.

As fans became more affluent, and especially as they moved to the suburbs and bought cars, the lack of parking became an important issue. Some ballparks remedied this problem through the construction of parking garages in the vicinity, or building new ballparks with ample parking. Others built ballparks in the suburbs, typically with large parking areas. The ballpark/stadium thus became an "island" in an "ocean" of parking space.

The modern "retro" trend strives to support multiple modes of transport, by having an urban location with available parking and accessibility by public transport.

== Types of ballparks ==
=== Wooden ballparks ===
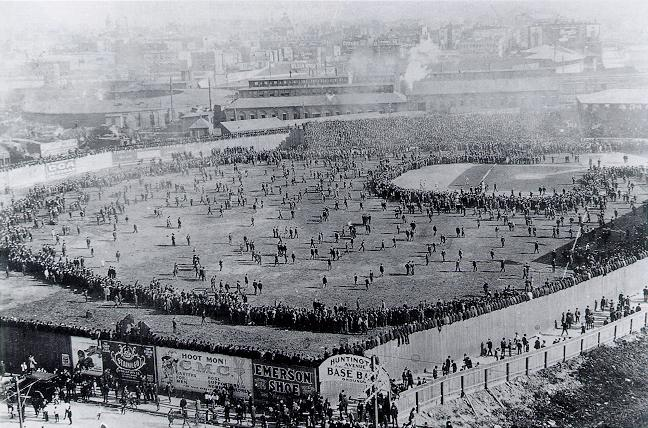
The Huntington Avenue Grounds during the 1903 World Series

The first professional baseball venues were large wooden ballparks with seats mounted on wood platforms. Although known for being constructed out of wood, they featured iron columns for better support. Some included one tier of inclined seating, topped with either a flat roof or, in some instances, a small upper tier. The outfield was bordered by tall walls or fences covered in advertisements, much like today's minor league parks. These advertisements were sometimes fronted with bleacher seats, or "bleaching boards". Wood, while prone to decomposition, was a relatively inexpensive material.

However, the use of wood as the primary material presented a major problem, especially as baseball continued to thrive. Over time, the wooden stands aged and dried. Many parks caught fire, and some were leveled completely. This problem, along with the popularization of baseball and expectations for long-term use of the parks were major factors that drove the transition to the new standard materials for ballparks: steel and concrete. Some famous wooden parks, such as the Polo Grounds III in New York and National League Park in Philadelphia, burned and were rebuilt with fire-resistant materials (Polo Grounds IV and Baker Bowl). Others were simply abandoned in favor of new structures built elsewhere. These new fire-resistant parks often lasted for many decades, and (retrospectively) came to be known as "jewel boxes". There are no more professional ballparks in existence left with this architectural trend, with the last one, Oriole Park V, burning down in 1944.

Ballpark	Location	Team	Opened	Closed	Demo'd	Current status
American League Park	Washington, D.C.	Senators	1901	1911	1911	Destroyed by fire. Now residential.
Bennett Park	Detroit	Tigers	1896	1911	1911	Replaced on site by Tiger Stadium. Now site of the Detroit's Police Athletic League.
Columbia Park	Philadelphia	Athletics	1901	1909	1913	Now residential.
Eastern Park	Brooklyn	Grooms	1891	1897	c. 1898	Now site of a car junkyard.
Exposition Park	Pittsburgh	Pirates	1890	1909	1915	Once a railroad yard, now parking for PNC Park. Interstate 279 runs over a portion of the property.
Hilltop Park	Manhattan	Highlanders	1903	1912	1914	Now site of New York–Presbyterian Hospital.
Huntington Avenue Grounds	Boston	Americans	1901	1911	1912	Now site of Northeastern's Solomon Court at Cabot Center.
Kennard Street Park	Cleveland	Blues	1879	1884	c. 1885	
League Park	Cleveland	Indians; Spiders	1891	1909	1909	Rebuilt on site. Now site of the Baseball Heritage Museum and the Fannie M. Lewis Community Park at League Park centered on the original diamond.
Lloyd Street Grounds	Milwaukee	Brewers	1895	1903	1904	Now residential.
National League Park	Cleveland	Blues; Spiders	1887	1890	c. 1891	
National League Park	Philadelphia	Phillies	1887	1894	1894	Destroyed by fire. Rebuilt as Baker Bowl. Now commercial.
Oriole Park I	Baltimore	Orioles	1882	1889	c. 1890	Now commercial.
Oriole Park II	Baltimore	Orioles	1890	1891	c. 1892	Replaced on site by Oriole Park III. Now commercial.
Oriole Park III	Baltimore	Orioles	1891	1900	c. 1901	Now commercial.
Oriole Park IV	Baltimore	Orioles	1901	1902	c. 1916	Now commercial.
Palace of the Fans	Cincinnati	Reds	1902	1911	1911	Replaced on site by Crosley Field. Now parking and commercial.
Polo Grounds I	Manhattan	Gothams, Metropolitans	1880	1889	1889	Destroyed by street construction. Now part of West 111th Street.
Polo Grounds II	Manhattan	Giants	1889	1891	1911	Site served as parking for Polo Grounds IV until the 1963 season. Now public housing.
Polo Grounds III	Manhattan	Giants	1890	1911	1911	Destroyed by fire. Rebuilt as Polo Grounds IV. Now public housing.
Recreation Park	Detroit	Wolverines	1881	1888	1894	Now site of the Detroit Medical Center.
Robison Field	St. Louis	Cardinals	1893	1920	1926	Now site of Beaumont High School.
South End Grounds	Boston	Beaneaters	1871	1914	1914	Now parking for Mass Transit station.
South Side Park	Chicago	Colts; White Sox	1893	1940	1940	Now site of the Chicago Housing Authority's Wentworth Gardens.
Terrapin Park (Oriole Park V)	Baltimore	Terrapins	1914	1944	1944	Destroyed by fire. Now commercial.
Washington Park II	Brooklyn	Superbas	1898	1913	1913	Replaced by concrete and steel Washington Park 1914.
West Side Park I	Chicago	White Stockings	1885	1891	c. 1892	Now site of the Chicago World Language Academy.
West Side Park II	Chicago	Cubs	1893	1915	1915	Now site of the University of Illinois Medical Center.

=== Jewel box ballparks ===
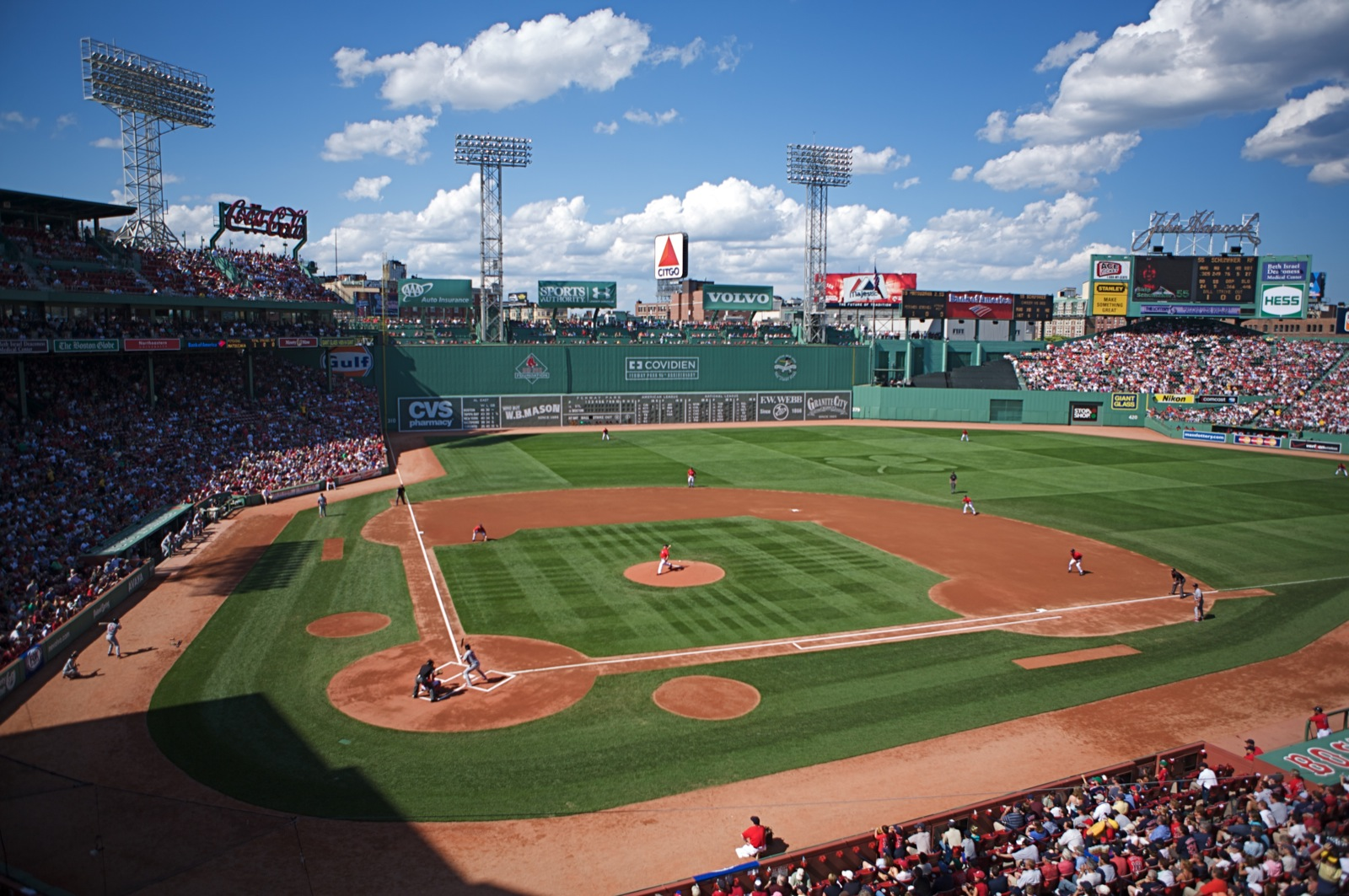
Fenway Park is the oldest active ballpark in Major League Baseball. The famed Green Monster is the left field fence.

The earliest ballparks built or rebuilt of reinforced concrete, brick, and steel are now known as the jewel box ballparks or classic parks. Two-tiered grandstands became much more prevalent in this era, as well. The Baker Bowl in Philadelphia, which opened in 1895, was the first to use steel and brick as the primary construction materials and included a cantilevered upper deck seating area that hung out over the lower seating area. Although it did not use reinforced concrete in its construction, Baker Bowl is considered the first of the jewel box parks. The first to use reinforced concrete was Shibe Park, which opened in 1909, also in Philadelphia.

The upper decks were typically held up by steel pillars that obstructed the view from some seats in the lower level. However, because of the supports used, the upper decks could come very close to the field. The two-tiered design was the standard for decades, until the New York Yankees built Yankee Stadium. To accommodate the large crowds Babe Ruth drew, Yankee Stadium was built with three tiers. This became the new standard until some recently built parks reverted to two, including PNC Park in 2001.

Most jewel box parks were built to fit the constraints of actual city blocks, often resulting in significantly asymmetrical outfield dimensions and large outfield walls to prevent easy home runs. Notable examples included League Park in Cleveland, which had a 40-foot (12 m)-tall wall in right field, and the Green Monster, the 37-foot (11 m)-tall left field wall at Fenway Park in Boston. Notable exceptions include Shibe Park and Comiskey Park, which were built on rectangular city blocks that were large enough to accommodate symmetrical left and right fields.

Other sports, such as soccer and football, were often played at these sites (Yankee Stadium, for example, was designed to accommodate football). In contrast to the later multi-purpose parks, the seats were generally angled in a configuration suitable for baseball. The "retro" ballparks built in the 1990s and beyond are an attempt to capture the feel of the jewel box parks. The only jewel box parks still used by Major League Baseball are Fenway Park and Wrigley Field.

==== Major League Baseball (MLB) ====
Ballpark	Location	Team	Opened	Lights installed	Closed	Demo'd	Current status
Baker Bowl	Philadelphia	Phillies	1895	Never	1938	1950	Now commercial
Braves Field	Boston	Braves	1915	1946	1952	1955	Closed for baseball in 1952, left field pavilion and "Jury Box" were demolished in 1955 and the grandstand was in 1959. Reconfigured into Boston University's Nickerson Field, with the right field pavilion still standing and in use. Only demolished Jewel Box ballpark with a portion of its original stands still standing and in use. Walter Brown Arena and Case Gym also occupy parts of the site.
Comiskey Park	Chicago	White Sox	1910	1939	1990	1991	Now parking for Rate Field.
Crosley Field	Cincinnati	Reds	1912	1935	1970	1972	Now parking and commercial.
Ebbets Field	Brooklyn	Dodgers	1913	1938	1957	1960	Now residential.
Fenway Park	Boston	Red Sox; Braves	1912	1947	—	—	Active. Renovated heavily in 1934 and from 2002 to 2011
Forbes Field	Pittsburgh	Pirates	1909	1940	1970	1971	Now site of University of Pittsburgh's Posvar Hall. Parts of the outfield wall survive.
Griffith Stadium	Washington, D.C.	Senators	1911	1941	1961	1965	Now site of the Howard University Hospital.
League Park	Cleveland	Indians	1910	Never	1946	1951	Now site of the Baseball Heritage Museum, housed in the stadium's original ticket office, and the Fannie M. Lewis Community Park at League Park centered on the original diamond, but with an artificial surface instead of the original grass field.
Polo Grounds IV	Manhattan	Giants; Yankees; Mets	1911	1940	1963	1964	Now public housing
Shibe Park	Philadelphia	Athletics; Phillies	1909	1939	1970	1976	Now site of the Deliverance Evangelistic Church.
Sportsman's Park	St. Louis	Browns; Cardinals	1902 (rebuilt 1909)	1940	1966	1966	Now site of the Herbert Hoover Boys and Girls Club, with the original playing field still in use for youth sports.
Tiger Stadium	Detroit	Tigers	1912	1948	1999	2009	Now site of the Detroit's Police Athletic League's Corner Ballpark, with the playing field still in use for youth sports, but with an artificial surface instead of the original grass field.
Wrigley Field	Chicago	Cubs	1914	1988	—	—	Active. Renovation began in 2014 and was fully completed by Opening Day 2019.
Yankee Stadium	The Bronx	Yankees	1923	1946	2008	2010	Renovated heavily from 1973 to 1976. Now site of "Heritage Field" in Macombs Dam Park.

==== Nippon Professional Baseball (NPB) ====
Ballpark	Location	Team	Opened	Lights installed	Closed	Demo'd	Current status
Fujiidera Stadium	Fujiidera	Kintetsu Buffaloes	1928	1984	2005	2006	Now site of Shitennoji Elementary School, Shitennoji Higashi Junior and Senior High School.
Hankyu Nishinomiya Stadium	Nishinomiya	Hankyu Braves	1937	1952	2002	2004	Now site of Hankyu Nishinomiya Gardens. From opening to 1950, the field was covered with grass not only outfield but also infield.
Hanshin Koshien Stadium	Nishinomiya	Hanshin Tigers	1924	1956	—	—	Active. Originally built for the Japan High School Baseball Federation for its national tournaments, and still hosts said events. Extensively renovated several times, most recently in 2007–2010, but retains most of its original character.
Korakuen Stadium	Tokyo	Yomiuri Giants (Note: Also used by six other professional teams.)	1937	1950	1987	1988	The Tokyo Dome Hotel sits in the former right-center field area. The remainder of the site is a plaza for the Dome and hotel.
Meiji Jingu Stadium	Tokyo	Tokyo Yakult Swallows	1926	1946	—	—	Active. Originally built for college baseball, and still serves as a home for events at that level. Plans are in place for the stadium to be demolished and rebuilt by 2033, where it and the adjacent Chichibunomiya Rugby Stadium will effectively switch locations within the property of the Meiji Shrine.

=== Multi-purpose stadiums ===
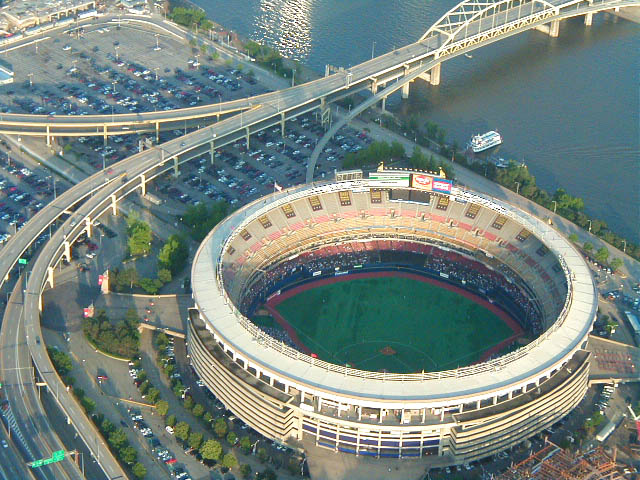
Aerial view of Three Rivers Stadium, c. 2000

From the 1960s until the arrival of retro parks in 1992, baseball built many multi-purpose ballparks. Also derisively known as "concrete donuts", "cookie-cutters", or "giant ashtrays", they were usually tall and circular or square structures made entirely of, usually bare, reinforced concrete. The parks were built to hold baseball, but also were able to host other sports, such as football and soccer. One of the earliest baseball stadiums that incorporated this type of design was Cleveland Stadium (built 1932), which featured an oval grandstand that was more friendly to goal-centered sports like football. A park built to suit all sports well, which was co-owned by the teams or the city, seemed advantageous to all, especially because it was less expensive to maintain one stadium rather than two. Some parks that were originally built for one sport were renovated to accommodate multiple sports.

The shape of the parks generally depended on the original use. Ballparks that were renovated to accommodate football, like Candlestick Park and Anaheim Stadium, were usually asymmetrically shaped. Football stadiums that were renovated to accommodate baseball, like Sun Life Stadium and Mile High Stadium, were usually of a rectangular shape, though Mile High actually started its life in 1948 as a Minor League Baseball park known as Bears Stadium. Parks that were built to serve both were usually circular and completely enclosed on all sides. These were the parks that gained multi-purpose parks the reputation as bland cookie-cutter structures. The first of these parks was DC Stadium (renamed RFK Stadium in 1969) in the District of Columbia. RFK is unique in that it hosted two different baseball teams, and that it was the first to originally be intended for multiple sports.

A notable variant among the cookie-cutter stadia was Shea Stadium. Its grandstand extended just beyond the foul poles and did not completely enclose the field. Plans were made to enclose the grandstand and build a dome, but engineers discovered that the structure could not handle the load of the proposed dome. Thus, the area behind the outfield fence remained open.

One major innovation of the multi-purpose parks was the cantilevered upper deck. In earlier ballparks, the columns used to support the upper decks obstructed the view from some seats in the lower deck. In the new design, the upper decks were extended upwards and the columns were removed. However, even though the extension counterbalanced some of the weight, the upper decks could no longer extend as close to the field and had to be moved back. Also, the roofs could no longer be as large, and often only covered the top 15 or so rows. This exposed fans to the elements.

Besides the drawbacks of the cantilever design, there were other issues with these parks. With few exceptions, seating was angled to face the center of the field of play, rather than home plate. The furthest seats in these parks were 500 feet (150 m) or more from the plate. The capacities of these stadiums were larger than previous baseball stadiums. Typical game attendance did not fill the stadiums. Due to the rectangular shape needed for football or soccer, outfield dimensions were generally symmetrical, and even seats at field level down the lines could be far from the action.

Multi-purpose stadiums also posed issues for their non-baseball tenants. The "cookie-cutters" with swiveling, field-level sections proved problematic. Because the front rows were too close to the field, the fans had difficulty seeing over the football benches. This was evident in the movable seating sections in RFK Stadium. The first ten rows of the football configuration were practically at field level, and fans in those sections often stood up on their seats to get a better view. Other stadiums overcame this simply by covering those seats, not bothering to sell them. Despite being cost-effective, these problems eventually caused the parks to become unfashionable.

The multi-purpose architecture reached a climax when Toronto's SkyDome (now Rogers Centre) opened in 1989. It had state-of-the-art amenities including a retractable roof, hotel, and a restaurant behind the outfield from where patrons could view the games. Rogers Centre was renovated into a baseball only stadium from 2022 to 2024.

There are no more purely multi-purpose ballparks still in use today, with the Oakland Coliseum having been the last one in use. The Athletics moved out of Oakland Coliseum in 2024 and will play at West Sacramento's Sutter Health Park for three seasons as a new dedicated facility of their own is built in Las Vegas. Their former co-tenants, the NFL Oakland Raiders, moved to Las Vegas in 2020 and into Allegiant Stadium.

Ballpark	Location	Team	Opened	Closed	Demo'd	Current status	Football
Anaheim Stadium*	Anaheim, California	Angels	1966	—	—	Active. Originally a modern ballpark; renovated in 1979–80 to multipurpose and in 1996–98 back to baseball-only.	Rams
Arlington Stadium	Arlington, Texas	Rangers	1965	1993	1994	Never used for professional football due to the Dallas Cowboys building Texas Stadium. Now parking for Choctaw Stadium; the National Medal of Honor Museum occupies parts of the site.	N/A
Astrodome^{‡}	Houston	Astros	1965	2004	—	Inactive; structure still standing but has not seen regular use since its closure. Most recently served as a shelter for people displaced by Hurricane Katrina and Hurricane Rita.	Oilers
Atlanta–Fulton County Stadium	Atlanta	Braves	1966	1996	1997	Site served as parking for Turner Field until the Braves moved to Truist Park after the 2016 season. Afterwards served as parking for Center Parc Stadium until the 2025 season. Georgia State University is currently building a new ballpark within the original stadium footprint along with a softball park.	Falcons
Busch Memorial Stadium	St. Louis	Cardinals	1966	2005	2005	Now site of Ballpark Village along with plaza area for Busch Stadium III.	Cardinals; Rams
Candlestick Park*	San Francisco	Giants	1960	2013	2015	Originally a modern ballpark; renovated in 1971–72 to multipurpose; closed for baseball in 1999 and demolished in 2015. Site currently vacant; most recent redevelopment plans call for an office complex.	Raiders*; 49ers
Cleveland Municipal Stadium	Cleveland	Indians	1931	1995	1996	Closed for baseball in 1993 and demolished in 1996. Now site of Huntington Bank Field.	Indians; Rams; Browns
Canadian National Exhibition Stadium**	Toronto	Blue Jays	1959	1989	1999	Closed for baseball in 1989 and demolished in 1996. Now site of BMO Field.	Argonauts
Hubert H. Humphrey Metrodome^{‡}	Minneapolis	Twins	1982	2013	2014	Closed for baseball in 2009 and demolished in 2014. Now site of U.S. Bank Stadium.	Vikings
Kingdome^{‡}	Seattle	Mariners	1976	2000	2000	Now site of Lumen Field.	Seahawks
Memorial Stadium	Baltimore	Orioles	1950	1997	2001	Closed for baseball in 1991 and demolished in 2001. Now residential. Includes the Cal Ripken Sr. Youth Development Field in the footprint of field, but with an artificial surface instead of the original grass field.	Colts; Stallions; Ravens
Mile High Stadium*	Denver	Rockies	1948	2001	2002	Originally a minor-league baseball stadium in 1948. Closed for baseball in 1994 and demolished in 2002. Now parking for Empower Field at Mile High.	Broncos
Oakland Coliseum	Oakland, California	Athletics	1966	—	—	Active; but no longer used for baseball. Closed for baseball in 2024. Currently in use for the Oakland Roots SC of the USL Championship and the Oakland Soul SC of the USL W League.	Raiders
Olympic Stadium^{‡}	Montreal	Expos	1976	—	—	Inactive. Built for the 1976 Summer Olympics. Installed in April 1987, the roof was retracted about 80 times before it was closed for good in 1991. Roofless in 1998, second roof installed in 1999. Last used regularly in 2004 when Expos moved to Washington, D.C., and became the Washington Nationals. The Toronto Blue Jays currently host an exhibition game in the venue.	Alouettes
Robert F. Kennedy Memorial Stadium	Washington, D.C.	Senators; Nationals	1961	2020	2026	Closed for baseball in 2007 and demolished in 2026. Will be replaced by the New Stadium at RFK Campus, which is set to open in 2030.	Redskins
Riverfront Stadium	Cincinnati	Reds	1970	2002	2002	Now site of the Cincinnati Reds Hall of Fame and Museum and the National Underground Railroad Freedom Center.	Bengals
Rogers Centre^{‡}	Toronto	Blue Jays	1989	—	—	Active; Renovated to baseball only from 2022 to 2024.	Argonauts; Bills
Shea Stadium	Queens	Mets; Yankees	1964	2008	2009	Now parking for Citi Field and the USTA Billie Jean King National Tennis Center; a casino and entertainment complex is proposed to be built on the site.	Jets; Giants
San Diego Stadium	San Diego	Padres	1967	2020	2021	Closed for baseball in 2003 and demolished in 2021. Site now occupied by SDSU Mission Valley, a campus expansion that contains Snapdragon Stadium.	Chargers
Sun Life Stadium**	Miami Gardens, Florida	Marlins	1987	—	—	Active, but no longer used for baseball. Built as a football-only stadium in 1987, renovated in 1991–92 to multipurpose, closed for baseball in 2012. Heavily renovated into football only in 2015. Since 2019, also the main stadium for tennis' Miami Open. The Formula One Miami Grand Prix, first held in 2022, uses the stadium grounds, but not the stadium itself.	Dolphins
Three Rivers Stadium	Pittsburgh	Pirates	1970	2000	2001	Now parking for Acrisure Stadium and PNC Park; Stage AE and the Root Sports Pittsburgh studios occupy parts of the site.	Steelers

*A baseball-only ballpark converted to a multi-purpose stadium.

**A football-only stadium converted to a multi-purpose stadium.

‡ denotes stadium is also a retractable-roof / indoor stadium

=== Indoor ballparks ===
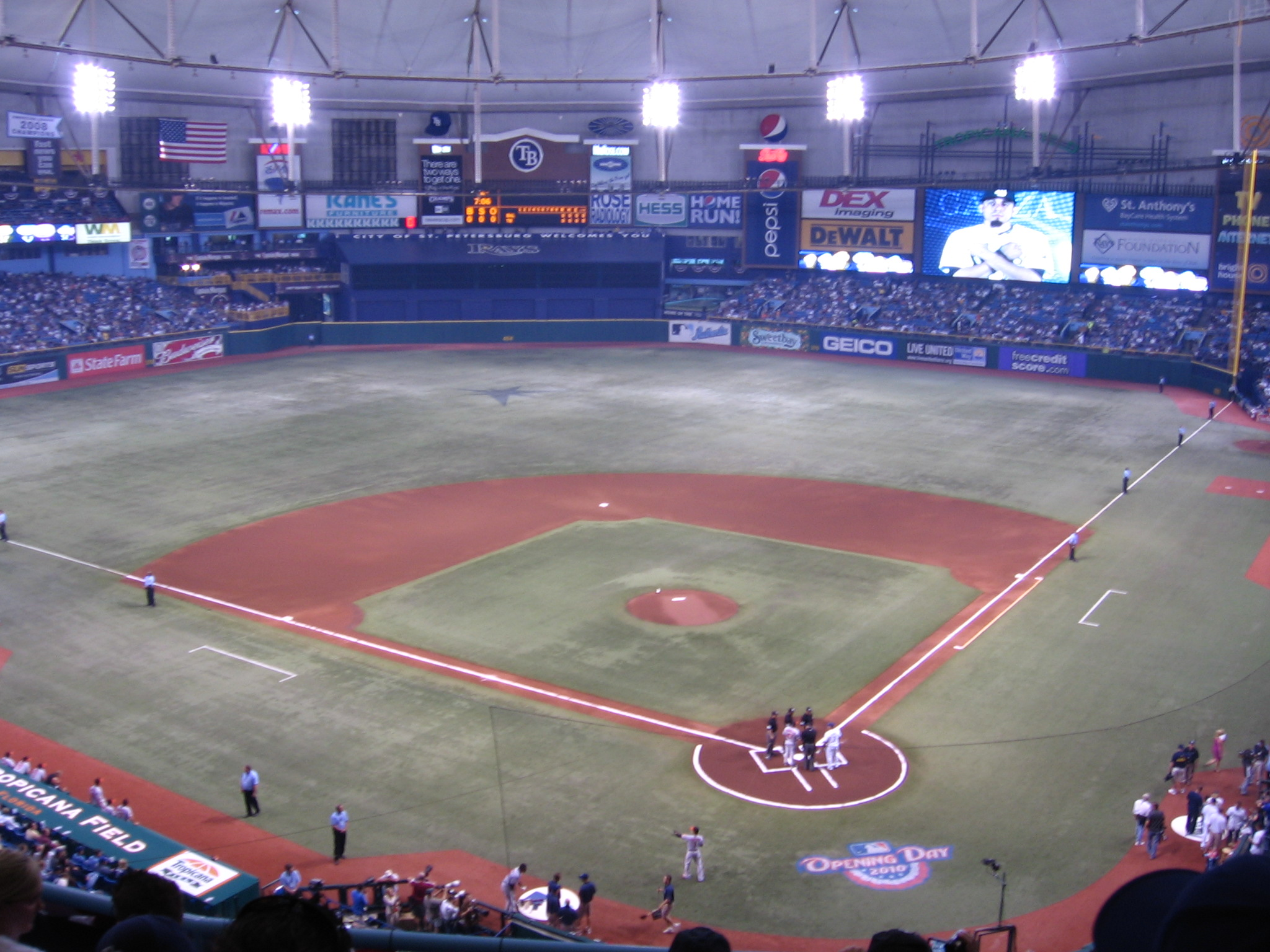
Tropicana Field, currently the only active indoor-only MLB ballpark

An important type of ballpark is the indoor park. These parks are covered with a fixed roof, usually a hard concrete dome. The reasons to build indoor parks are varied. The Astrodome, the first indoor sports stadium ever built, was built to escape the hot and very humid climate of Houston and the Kingdome was built to escape Seattle's constant fall and winter rains. In Japan, domed stadiums were built to escape frequently rainy climates, as well as extreme snowfall in Sapporo. There is little to no natural light in these parks, necessitating the use of one of the most distinguishing aspects of an indoor park: artificial turf. While technology now allows for grass to be used in indoor venues (see Forsyth Barr Stadium, a rugby venue in New Zealand with an skylit ETFE roof allowing grass to be grown indoors, or NFL stadiums like State Farm Stadium and Allegiant Stadium, which allow the grass field to be grown outside and then rolled indoors for games), the first generation of indoor parks predated such abilities. Since there was not enough light to grow grass, artificial turf is installed, and this affected the game. Artificial turf is harder, and thus a ball hit on the ground moves faster and bounces higher. This, coupled with the usually dull white or gray roofs that could camouflage a fly ball, causing what Twins fans called a "dome-field advantage".

A park of note is Olympic Stadium in Montreal. The park was designed with a large tower that loomed over top. Cables came down from the top of the tower to connect to the large oval center of the roof. This oval center was supposed to be lifted by the cables, opening the park up if the weather was pleasant. However, the mechanism never worked correctly, and what was supposed to be a retractable roof was initially not used, then used for only a short period of time, and later replaced with a permanently fixed roof, making the stadium a strictly indoor facility.

Another notable park was the Hubert H. Humphrey Metrodome in Minneapolis, which instead of a rigid masonry roof was covered by inflatable fiberglass sheeting, held up by air pressure. A drawback to this design, at least in Minnesota's severe winter climate, was revealed when the dome collapsed three times in its first three years of operation due to accumulated snow. The Tokyo Dome has a similar roof; due to Tokyo's considerably milder winter climate, that stadium has not had the Metrodome's snow-related issues.

The first generation of indoor parks faced many of the same problems of the multi-purpose parks. Tropicana Field is the only indoor-only or fixed-dome park built specifically for baseball and the only one left hosting a Major League Baseball team, and is scheduled to be replaced with a new indoor ballpark in the near future. The new ballpark for the Las Vegas Athletics is slated to have a fixed skylit roof to allow natural light in, like Allegiant Stadium. Japan still has several fixed-dome parks designed primarily for baseball. One of these, the Sapporo Dome (now no longer used for baseball), features two separate playing surfaces. Baseball was played on a permanently installed artificial surface within the dome, while a permanent grass pitch is attached to the structure and mechanically slid into the dome for use in soccer matches.

==== MLB ====
Ballpark	Location	Team	Opened	Closed	Demo'd	Current status	Other sports
Astrodome	Houston	Astros	1965	2004	—	Inactive; structure still standing but has not seen regular use since its closure. Most recently served as a shelter for people displaced by Hurricane Katrina and Hurricane Rita. Multi-purpose stadium.	Oilers
Hubert H. Humphrey Metrodome	Minneapolis	Twins	1982	2013	2014	Closed for baseball in 2009 and demolished in 2014. Now site of U.S. Bank Stadium. Multi-purpose stadium with inflatable roof.	Vikings; Timberwolves
Kingdome	Seattle	Mariners	1976	2000	2000	Now site of Lumen Field. Multi-purpose stadium.	Seahawks; SuperSonics
New Las Vegas Stadium	Paradise, Nevada	Athletics	2028	—	—	Under construction. Contemporary ballpark with skylit roof.	N/A
Olympic Stadium	Montreal	Expos	1976	—	—	Inactive. Built for the 1976 Summer Olympics. Installed in April 1987, the roof was retracted about 80 times before it was closed for good in 1991. Roofless in 1998, second roof installed in 1999. Last used regularly in 2004 when Expos moved to Washington, D.C., and became the Washington Nationals. The Toronto Blue Jays currently host an exhibition game in the venue. Multi-purpose stadium.	Alouettes
Tropicana Field	St. Petersburg, Florida	Devil Rays/Rays	1990	—	—	Active. Modern ballpark. The Rays are scheduled to build a new indoor ballpark in the near future.	Lightning

==== NPB ====
Ballpark	Location	Team	Opened	Closed	Demo'd	Current status	Other sports/notes
Kyocera Dome Osaka	Osaka	Orix Buffaloes (Note: Originally built for the Kintetsu Buffaloes, which merged with the Orix BlueWave to create the current Orix Buffaloes.) (Note: Also used by the Hanshin Tigers for season openers and August home games when their normal home of Koshien Stadium is being used for national high school tournaments.)	1997	—	—	Active. Modern ballpark.	N/A
Belluna Dome	Tokorozawa	Saitama Seibu Lions	1979	—	—	Active. Modern ballpark. Originally an open-air stadium; dome added in two phases over 1997 and 1998.	N/A
Sapporo Dome	Sapporo	Hokkaido Nippon-Ham Fighters	2001	—	—	Active, but no longer used for baseball. Can be defined as either a modern or contemporary ballpark. Fixed roof with two playing surfaces—artificial turf for baseball, slide-in grass pitch for soccer. Replaced as a baseball venue in 2023 by Es Con Field Hokkaido.	Hokkaido Consadole Sapporo
Tokyo Dome	Tokyo	Yomiuri Giants	1988	—	—	Active. Modern ballpark with inflatable roof.	None on a regular basis; has hosted occasional American football games. Also a major pro wrestling venue, most notably for NJPW's Wrestle Kingdom.
Vantelin Dome Nagoya	Nagoya	Chunichi Dragons (Note: Occasionally used by two other NPB teams, the Kintetsu Buffaloes and Orix BlueWave (now merged into the Orix Buffaloes).)	1997	—	—	Active. Modern ballpark.	N/A

=== Modern ballparks ===
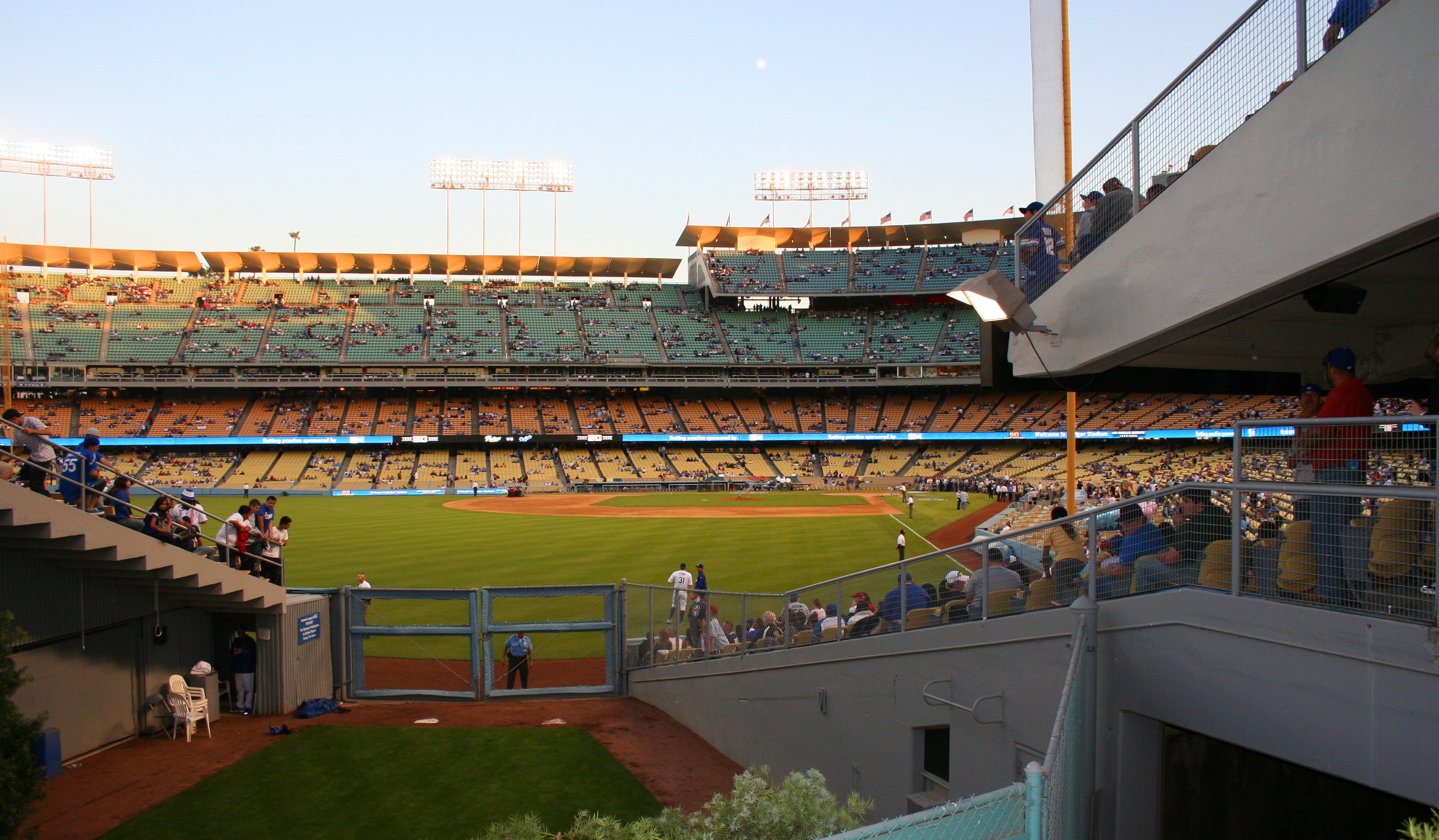
Dodger Stadium's varicolored seats

While most teams turned to multi-purpose parks, some built baseball-only parks. While these modern ballparks shirked some of the conventions of multi-purpose parks, they did include some of the new features. The most notable influences were the cantilevered upper decks, the use of seating colors other than green, fairly plain concrete exteriors, and symmetrical outfields. While the multi-purpose parks have become all but extinct, some modern parks, such as Dodger Stadium and Kauffman Stadium, have been hailed for aging beautifully. Rather than build new parks, the teams have decided instead to renovate the current structures, adding a few newer conveniences. Several of the modern parks built as such have remained in use, with no indication of being demolished.

While Cleveland Stadium is the ancestor to the multi-purpose ballpark, the ancestor of the modern ballpark is Milwaukee County Stadium. It was the first to feature a symmetrical, round outfield fence. It also featured the rounded V-shaped grandstand and colorful seats that are common among modern parks. Coincidentally, it would have been one of the earlier examples of a converted park as well. It was supposed to replace a minor league facility, and serve as home of the minor league team until a major league franchise could be lured to the city. However, the Braves came to Milwaukee earlier than expected, and the minor league team never played in the stadium.

The first two truly modern ballparks were built by the two New York teams who moved to California, the Giants and the Dodgers. Candlestick Park was created first, but was converted to a multi-purpose park to accommodate the 49ers. Dodger Stadium has been upgraded a number of times, but remains baseball-only and its original design is still largely intact.

Anaheim Stadium, which was initially modeled closely on Dodger Stadium, was expanded for football, but once the Rams departed, most of the extra outfield seating was peeled back, returning the structure to something closer to its original design.

The original Yankee Stadium is an exceptional case. Yankee Stadium was originally built as a jewel box park, albeit a very large one. It was showing its age in the 1970s, and the stadium was extensively renovated during 1973–1975, converting it into more of a modern style ballpark. Many of the characteristics that defined it as a classical jewel box were retained, so the remodeled Stadium straddled both categories.

Rogers Centre, which has a retractable roof and Tropicana Field, which has a fixed roof, can also be considered modern ballparks. Originally built as a multi-purpose stadium, Rogers Centre has been renovated as a baseball only park, while Tropicana Field was built with the intent to attract an MLB team to the Tampa Bay area.

New Comiskey Park (now Rate Field) was the last modern ballpark to be built in North America. A series of renovations have been made to make it appear more like a retro-classic ballpark.

Although they were purposefully built for baseball, some of these stadiums also hosted professional soccer and football teams at times. The Minnesota Vikings played at Metropolitan Stadium during the Twins' entire tenure there, and the Green Bay Packers played a few home games at Milwaukee County Stadium every year from 1953 through 1994. A few of them, including Metropolitan Stadium, also hosted NASL teams during the 1970s.

The only modern parks still used by Major League Baseball are Dodger Stadium, Angel Stadium, Kauffman Stadium, Rate Field, Rogers Centre and Tropicana Field, although Rate Field has been renovated into a Retro-classic ballpark while Angel Stadium and Kauffman Stadium have been renovated into Retro-modern ballparks; Tropicana Field, Rate Field and Kauffman Stadium are planned to be replaced with new ballparks in the near future.

==== MLB ====
Ballpark	Location	Team	Opened	Closed	Demo'd	Current status
Angel Stadium	Anaheim, California	Angels	1966	—	—	Active. Renovated in 1979–80 for football and in 1996–98 back to baseball-only.
Candlestick Park	San Francisco	Giants	1960	2013	2015	Originally a modern ballpark; renovated in 1971–72 to multi-purpose; closed for baseball in 1999; demolished in 2015. Site currently vacant; most recent redevelopment plans call for an office complex.
Dodger Stadium	Los Angeles	Dodgers; Angels	1962	—	—	Active. Renovated heavily from 2012 to 2020.
Kauffman Stadium	Kansas City, Missouri	Royals	1973	—	—	Active. Renovated heavily from 2007 to 2009. The Royals are scheduled to build a new ballpark in the near future.
Metropolitan Stadium	Bloomington, Minnesota	Twins	1956	1981	1985	Now site of the Mall of America.
Milwaukee County Stadium	Milwaukee	Braves; Brewers	1953	2000	2001	Now site of Helfaer Field along with parking for American Family Field.
Rate Field	Chicago	White Sox	1991	—	—	Active. Renovated heavily from 2001 to 2011. The White Sox are scheduled to build a new ballpark in the near future.
Rogers Centre^{‡}	Toronto	Blue Jays	1989	—	—	Active. Originally a multi-purpose stadium. Renovated to baseball only from 2022 to 2024.
Tropicana Field^{‡}	St. Petersburg, Florida	Devil Rays/Rays	1990	—	—	Active. The Rays are scheduled to build a new ballpark in the near future.
Yankee Stadium I	The Bronx	Yankees	1923	2008	2010	Renovated heavily from 1973 to 1976. Now site of "Heritage Field" in Macombs Dam Park.

==== NPB ====
Ballpark	Location	Team	Opened	Closed	Demo'd	Current status
Fukuoka PayPay Dome^{‡}	Fukuoka	Fukuoka SoftBank Hawks	1993	—	—	Active

‡ denotes stadium is also a retractable-roof / indoor ballpark

=== Retractable-roof ballparks ===
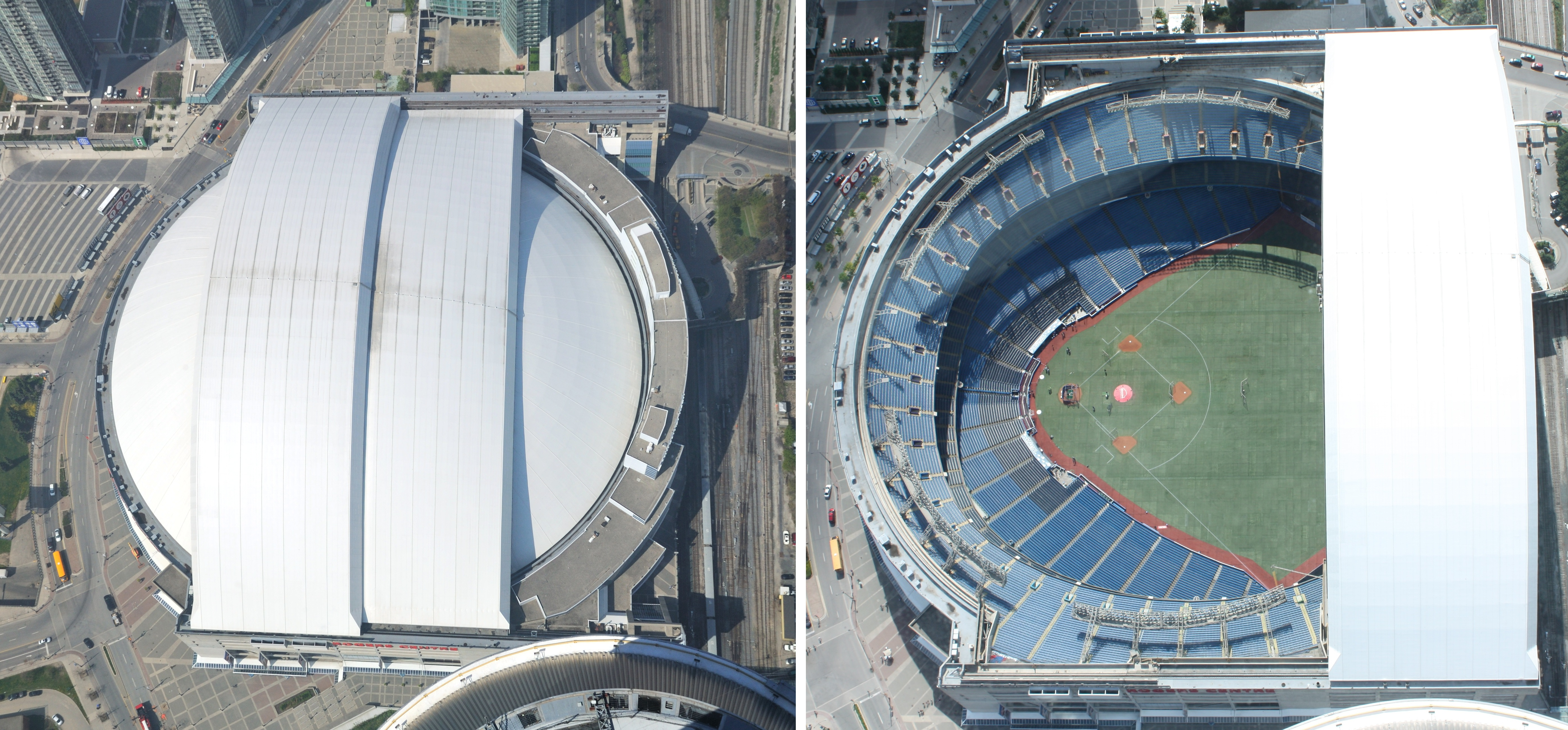
Rogers Centre is the first functional retractable-roof stadium, shown with the roof both opened and closed.

The indoor parks were built for several different reasons, chief among those weather. However, as multi-purpose parks became unfashionable, so did indoor parks. This led to the creation of retractable-roof parks. These allowed shelter from the elements, but still could be open when the weather was pleasant. To be able to support the roof, most were closed in on all sides like multi-purpose and indoor parks.

Because the roof needs to go somewhere when not covering the field, a distinguishing characteristic of the retractable roof park is a large extension of the interior spaces to either one side of the field or both sides that the roof sits on when retracted. The only exception to this is American Family Field, whose fan-shaped roof folds in upon itself and hangs behind the stands down the foul lines. Often, when retracted, the roof still hangs over the field, casting large shadows. This is countered at American Family Field by large panes of glass under the roof. While most stadiums seal up when the roof is closed, others remain partially open, such as T-Mobile Park, whose roof acts as an "umbrella" to shield from Seattle's frequently rainy weather.

Pittsburgh's Civic Arena was the first sports building in the world with a retractable roof; however, the building was originally constructed for the Pittsburgh Civic Light Opera, which moved out in 1969 due to dissatisfaction with the acoustics in the arena. The arena's long-term tenants, the NHL's Pittsburgh Penguins, never played with the roof open, and the arena itself was never used for baseball (and was too small to be used for that sport). While Montreal's Olympic Stadium was the first baseball park to have a retractable roof, the roof was plagued by numerous problems, and was never fully used. This made Rogers Centre the first fully functional retractable-roof park. It managed to succeed where Olympic Stadium failed, building a multi-section roof that folded upon itself, retracting over the hotel in center field.

Retractable-roof parks can vary greatly in style, from the utilitarian (Rogers Centre), to those infused with retro elements (such as Daikin Park), to the contemporary (loanDepot Park). The style of each park reflects the popular architecture of the era in which it was built. (This differs from indoor ballparks, all of which were built during the time of multi-purpose parks, and thus reflected the same "flying-saucer" style.) When Rogers Centre opened in 1989, baseball was near the end of the modern and multi-purpose era. Chase Field, T-Mobile Park, Daikin Park, and American Family Field all opened in the middle of the retro era. When loanDepot Park opened in 2012 as Marlins Park, it introduced a new, contemporary style. The Texas Rangers built Globe Life Field in the retro style similar to their previous ballpark, Globe Life Park.

Therefore, the term "retractable-roof ballpark/stadium" is not a description of the overall architectural style of the building, but of the functional aspect of it. For this reason, retractable-roof parks are also dual-listed in style-based types of ballparks. For example, the four retractable-roof parks built in the United States during the retro era are also considered to be retro-modern ballparks.

==== MLB ====
Ballpark	Location	Team	Opened	Closed	Demo'd	Current status
American Family Field	Milwaukee	Brewers	2001	—	—	Active. Retro-modern ballpark.
Chase Field	Phoenix	Diamondbacks	1998	—	—	Active. Retro-modern ballpark.
Daikin Park	Houston	Astros	2000	—	—	Active. Retro-modern ballpark.
Globe Life Field	Arlington, Texas	Rangers	2020	—	—	Active. Retro-modern ballpark.
LoanDepot Park	Miami	Marlins	2012	—	—	Active. Contemporary ballpark.
Olympic Stadium	Montreal	Expos	1976	—	—	Inactive. Multi-purpose stadium. Installed in April 1987, the roof was retracted about 80 times before it was closed for good in 1991. Roofless in 1998, second roof installed in 1999. Last used regularly in 2004 when Expos moved to Washington, D.C., and became the Washington Nationals. The Toronto Blue Jays currently host an exhibition game in the venue.
Rogers Centre	Toronto	Blue Jays	1989	—	—	Active. Modern ballpark, originally a multi-purpose stadium. Renovated to baseball only from 2022 to 2024.
T-Mobile Park	Seattle	Mariners	1999	—	—	Active. Retro-modern ballpark.

==== NPB ====
Ballpark	Location	Team	Opened	Closed	Demo'd	Current status
Mizuho PayPay Dome Fukuoka	Fukuoka	Fukuoka SoftBank Hawks	1993	—	—	Active. Modern ballpark.
Es Con Field Hokkaido	Kitahiroshima	Hokkaido Nippon-Ham Fighters	2023	—	—	Active. Contemporary ballpark.

=== Retro-classic ballparks ===
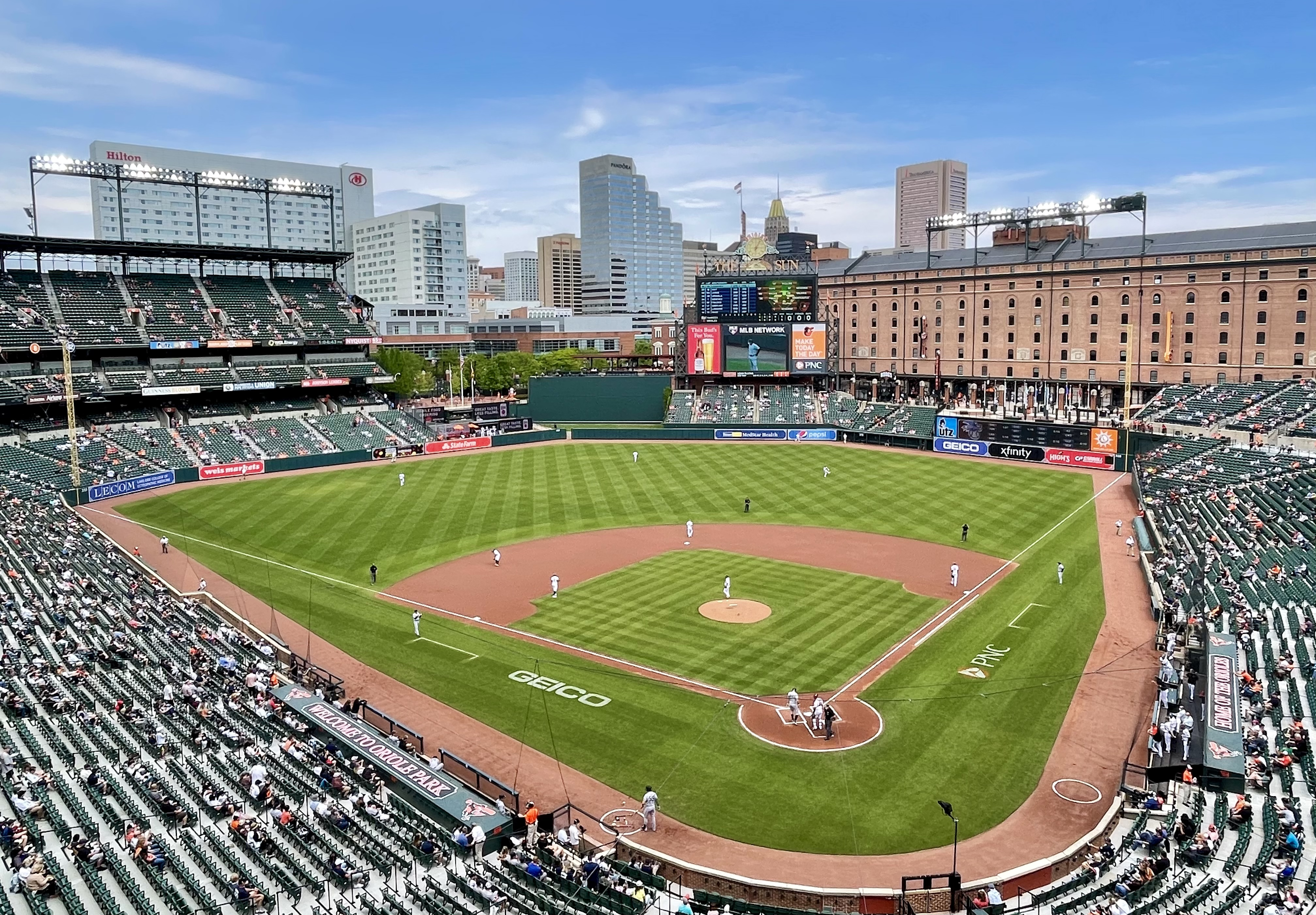
Camden Yards started the nostalgic craze with a smaller, red brick and forest green stadium.

HOK Sport, now known as Populous, designed Sahlen Field in Buffalo to attract a major league franchise to the city. The stadium opened in 1988 as home of the Buffalo Bisons, but was passed over in the 1993 Major League Baseball expansion (Sahlen Field was eventually used as a temporary MLB facility by the Toronto Blue Jays in the 2020 season and 2021 season due to Canada's travel restrictions following the outbreak of COVID-19). HOK Sport would take what they learned in Buffalo about styling a retro-classic ballpark, or retro/jewel box ballpark, to their major league project in Baltimore.

In 1992, Oriole Park at Camden Yards opened in Baltimore in a similar style and color to a jewel box park, but with more features and accommodations. The ballpark also has a modern, stepped-deck layout, columns removed, and fencing changed.

Since Camden Yards opened, two-thirds of all major league teams have opened new ballparks, each of which contain unique features. The most important feature was that they were built primarily for baseball, although these venues have also hosted football, soccer and ice hockey games. Turner Field was originally constructed as Centennial Olympic Stadium for the 1996 Summer Olympics and was retrofitted to baseball the following year.

Rate Field was the last modern park built in 1991 and was viewed as obsolete a year after opening. The White Sox responded with a series of retro-classic style renovations, such as roofing changes, asymmetrical fencing, and a dark green color scheme. Upper deck seating was also reduced to eliminate less purchased seating locations.

The most recent retro-classic ballparks were built in New York City. Queens' Citi Field is modeled after Ebbets Field, and the Bronx's Yankee Stadium is modeled after the pre-renovation "House that Ruth Built". Both parks opened in 2009.

Teams are now trending away from the retro-classic look and are instead building retro-modern and contemporary ballparks. Turner Field was the first retro-classic park replaced, as the Atlanta Braves moved to Truist Park in 2017, while the Texas Rangers moved from Globe Life Park in Arlington to the retractable-roof Globe Life Field in 2020. Rate Field is planned to be replaced with a new ballpark in the near future.

Ballpark	Location	Team	Opened	Closed	Demo'd	Current status
Busch Stadium III	St. Louis	Cardinals	2006	—	—	Active
Citi Field	Queens	Mets	2009	—	—	Active
Citizens Bank Park	Philadelphia	Phillies	2004	—	—	Active
Comerica Park	Detroit	Tigers	2000	—	—	Active
Coors Field	Denver	Rockies	1995	—	—	Active
Globe Life Park in Arlington	Arlington, Texas	Rangers	1994	—	—	Active, but no longer used for baseball. Closed for baseball in 2019. Redeveloped as a multi-purpose stadium for North Texas SC, then of USL League One and now of MLS Next Pro; since renamed Choctaw Stadium.
George M. Steinbrenner Field	Tampa	Rays	1996	—	—	Active. Temporary home of the Rays for the 2025 season.
Oracle Park	San Francisco	Giants	2000	—	—	Active
Oriole Park at Camden Yards	Baltimore	Orioles	1992	—	—	Active
PNC Park	Pittsburgh	Pirates	2001	—	—	Active
Rate Field	Chicago	White Sox	1991	—	—	Active. Renovated heavily from 2001 to 2011. Originally a modern ballpark. The White Sox are scheduled to build a new ballpark in the near future.
Sahlen Field	Buffalo	Blue Jays	1988	—	—	Active. Temporary home of the Blue Jays for the 2020 and 2021 seasons.
Sutter Health Park	West Sacramento	Athletics	2000	—	—	Active. Temporary home of the Athletics for the 2025, 2026, and 2027 seasons.
Turner Field	Atlanta	Braves	1996	—	—	Active, but no longer used for baseball. Closed for baseball in 2017. Reconfigured as a multi-purpose stadium into Center Parc Stadium for Georgia State University. One of two former Braves ballpark to be converted to a college football stadium, after Boston's Nickerson Field.
Yankee Stadium II	The Bronx	Yankees	2009	—	—	Active

=== Retro-modern ballparks ===
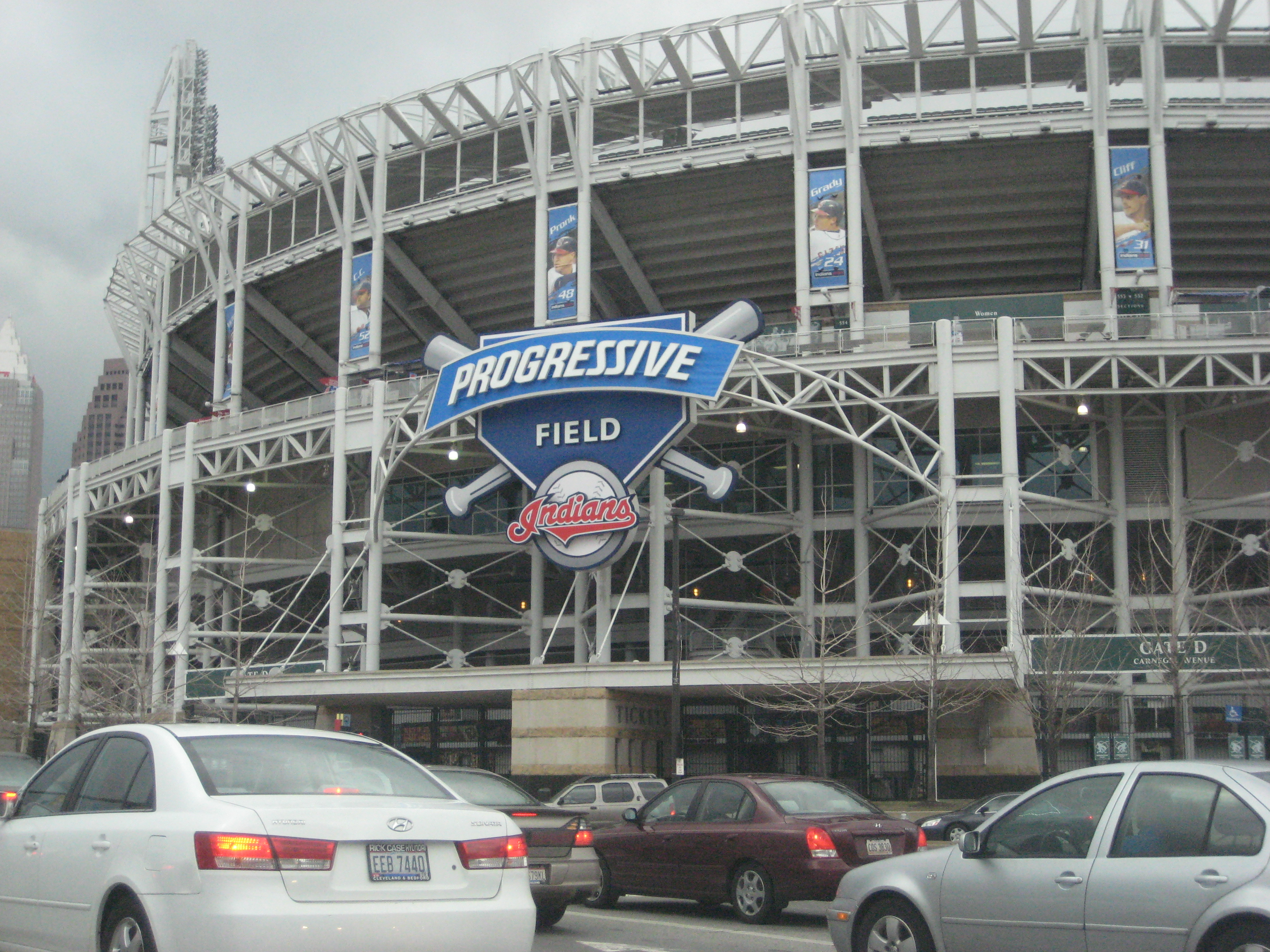
Progressive Field was the first retro park with a modern exterior.

While Camden Yards influenced nearly every ballpark built after it, not all fully adhere to its design. Those that deviate to incorporate more modern-looking elements are called retro-modern ballparks.

Progressive Field, originally Jacobs Field, was built two years after Camden Yards, and featured the angular, asymmetrical fences of varying heights, a smaller upper deck, stepped tiers, and an unobtrusive singular color scheme. While the interior has all the hallmarks of a retro park, the exterior did not feature the look of the jewel box parks. It could not truly be called a retro-classic park.

Many of today's parks have followed in this second school of retro. Rather than brick, the exteriors heavily feature white- or gray-painted steel. If there is any masonry, it is sandstone or limestone. Some feature progressive elements such as curtain walls, or retractable roofs.

Angel Stadium has seen many changes throughout the years. It was originally a modern park, similar to the Angels' previous home, Dodger Stadium. When the NFL's Los Angeles Rams left the Los Angeles Memorial Coliseum in 1980 and set up shop in what was then Anaheim Stadium, the first round of renovations began. The grandstand was expanded to completely enclose the stadium, turning it into a multi-purpose park. The Rams left in 1994, leaving the Angels alone in the large, 65,000-seat stadium. After a two-year renovation, the steel was painted green, and what concrete remained was painted sandstone, including the sweeping curve of the entrance plaza. The seating configuration was significantly altered, most notably by tearing out most of the outfield seating except for parts of the lower decks in left and right fields, to more closely resemble the original design from the park's first 15 years. The finished product in 1998 was a retro-modern ballpark.

In the same year, Chase Field opened as Bank One Ballpark for the expansion Arizona Diamondbacks, it incorporated a retractable roof and a swimming pool—elements that did not exist in jewel-box ballparks. Despite the absence of MLB history in the Phoenix area and an overwhelming roof design, much of the interior was still built with all of the hallmarks of retro, similar to Progressive Field. Although Chase Field was not the first retractable-roof ballpark in history, it was the first in a wave of four retractable-roof ballparks (opening within just four years) to follow the retro-modern pattern.

During the second decade of retro, Petco Park and Kauffman Stadium followed the construction and renovation concepts of Progressive Field and Angel Stadium, respectively. Meanwhile, the period saw another subset of three new retro-modern stadiums that pushed away from classic parks even more.

When Great American Ball Park opened in 2003, it featured a contemporary-looking, glass-wrapped facade. Such prominent use of elements that were unfamiliar even to pre-1992 modern stadiums signaled that some stadium planners were more willing to incorporate designs that looked into the 21st century as much as they did the 20th. Five years later, Nationals Park built off Cincinnati's design, making yet more liberal use of glass along with white concrete that would not clash with architecture in the District. Nationals Park became the first stadium to go green while still offering all of the amenities—another concept that looked ahead instead of behind. The retro-modern style climaxed in 2010 with the sculptured, contemporary exterior and canopy of Target Field, rendering it almost unrecognizable from the outside. Its cantilevered glass on top of a limestone base was designed partly to functionally fit the tiny 8-acre plot in the middle of a bustling transportation interchange. But the principal architect of Target Field, Earl Santee of Populous, said that the exterior was also an artistic interpretation of the culture of Minnesotans: a dichotomy of cosmopolitan and natural. Designing the building as a metaphor for people was a different way of thinking about ballpark architecture.

Subsequent retro-contemporary ballparks transitioned away from the architectural characteristics of both jewel-box and modern-style stadiums. While these venues incorporate contemporary amenities and field layouts, they maintain traditional aesthetic elements. Characteristic retro-style features include asymmetrical outfield fences and monochromatic color schemes, frequently utilizing forest green.

Es Con Field Hokkaido, a ballpark in a similar style built for the Hokkaido Nippon-Ham Fighters of Nippon Professional Baseball, opened in 2023.

==== MLB ====
Ballpark	Location	Team	Opened	Closed	Demo'd	Current status
American Family Field ^{‡}	Milwaukee	Brewers	2001	—	—	Active
Angel Stadium	Anaheim, California	Angels	1966	—	—	Active. Renovated heavily from 1979 to 1980, and again from 1996 to 1998. Originally a modern ballpark.
Chase Field ^{‡}	Phoenix, Arizona	Diamondbacks	1998	—	—	Active
Daikin Park ^{‡}	Houston	Astros	2000	—	—	Active
Globe Life Field ^{‡}	Arlington, Texas	Rangers	2020	—	—	Active
Great American Ball Park	Cincinnati	Reds	2003	—	—	Active
Kauffman Stadium	Kansas City, Missouri	Royals	1973	—	—	Active. Renovated heavily from 2007 to 2009. Originally a modern ballpark. The Royals are scheduled to build a new ballpark in the near future.
Nationals Park	Washington, D.C.	Nationals	2008	—	—	Active
Petco Park	San Diego	Padres	2004	—	—	Active
Progressive Field	Cleveland	Indians/Guardians	1994	—	—	Active. Renovated heavily from 2014 to 2016, and from 2023 to 2025.
T-Mobile Park ^{‡}	Seattle	Mariners	1999	—	—	Active
Target Field	Minneapolis	Twins	2010	—	—	Active
Truist Park	Atlanta	Braves	2017	—	—	Active

==== NPB ====
Ballpark	Location	Team	Opened	Closed	Demo'd	Current status
Es Con Field Hokkaido ^{‡}	Kitahiroshima	Hokkaido Nippon-Ham Fighters	2023	—	—	Active

‡ denotes stadium is also a retractable-roof ballpark

=== Contemporary ballparks ===
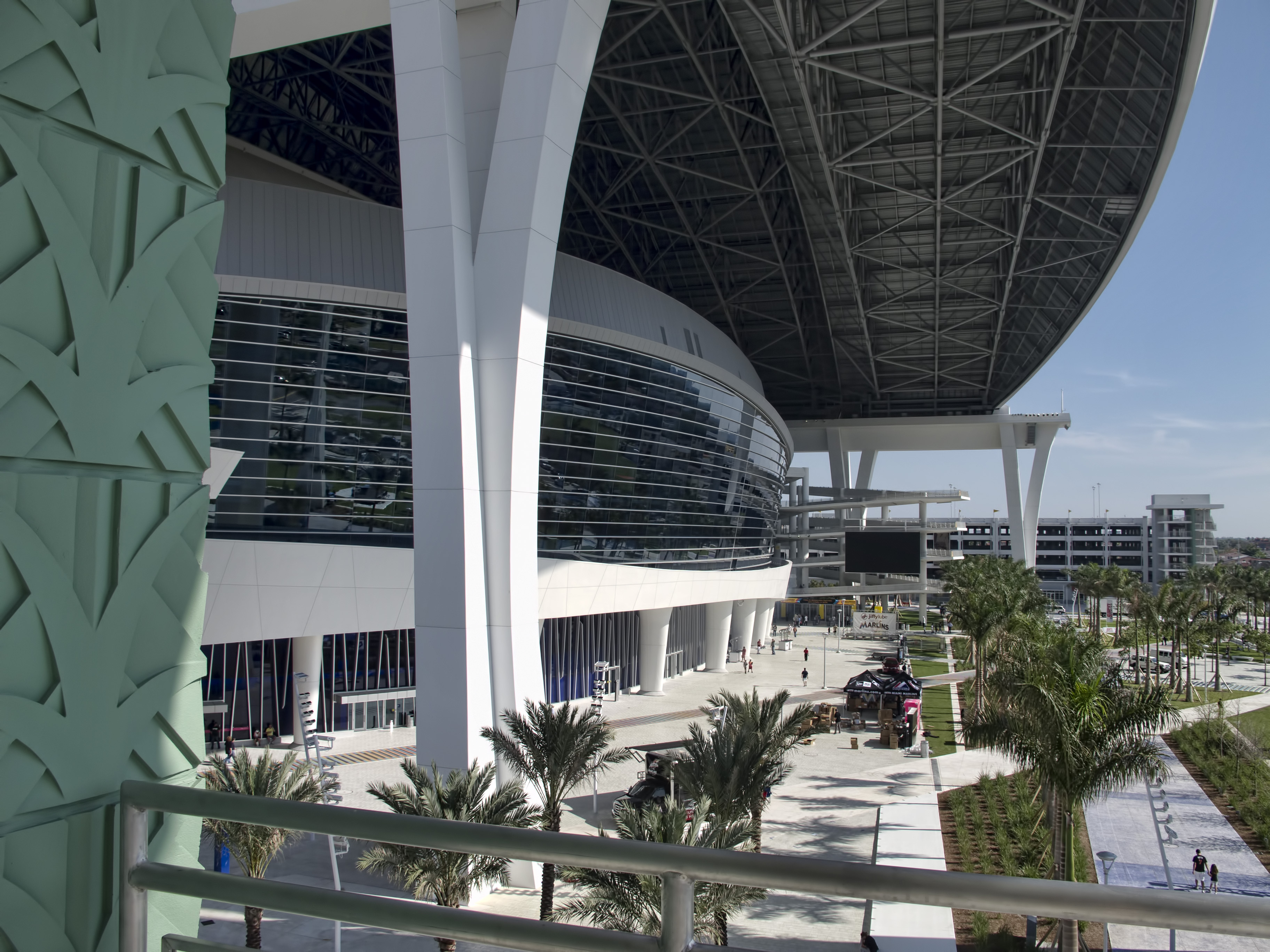
LoanDepot Park has a contemporary, Miami-centric design with a sculptural glass and curved depiction of "water merging with land", Miami-Deco tiles, and a bright multi-color scheme.

Prior to the start of the 2012 baseball season, USA Today noted that new Marlins Park would "perhaps provide a coda to the postmodern Camden Yards era". After two decades of the retro style dominating ballpark architecture, a new type of design emerged in 2012 with the opening of the venue now known as LoanDepot Park, snapping the consecutive streak of 20 new (plus 3 renovated) MLB retro stadiums. This latest style's purpose is to make the fan experience the present-day culture of the stadium's surrounding city or area, and rejects the basic notion of retro. Stadium planners are calling the style contemporary. The New Yorker wrote regarding the new MLB architecture: "The retro mold has finally been broken, but this might be the last chance a new style gets for some time."

The new ballpark for the Las Vegas Athletics was purposely designed to fit into the atmosphere of the surrounding Las Vegas Strip.

==== MLB ====
Ballpark	Location	Team	Opened	Closed	Demo'd	Current status
LoanDepot Park ^{‡}	Miami	Marlins	2012	—	—	Active
New Las Vegas Stadium ^{‡}	Paradise, Nevada	Athletics	2028	—	—	Under construction

‡ denotes stadium is also a retractable-roof / indoor ballpark

=== Temporary and converted ballparks ===
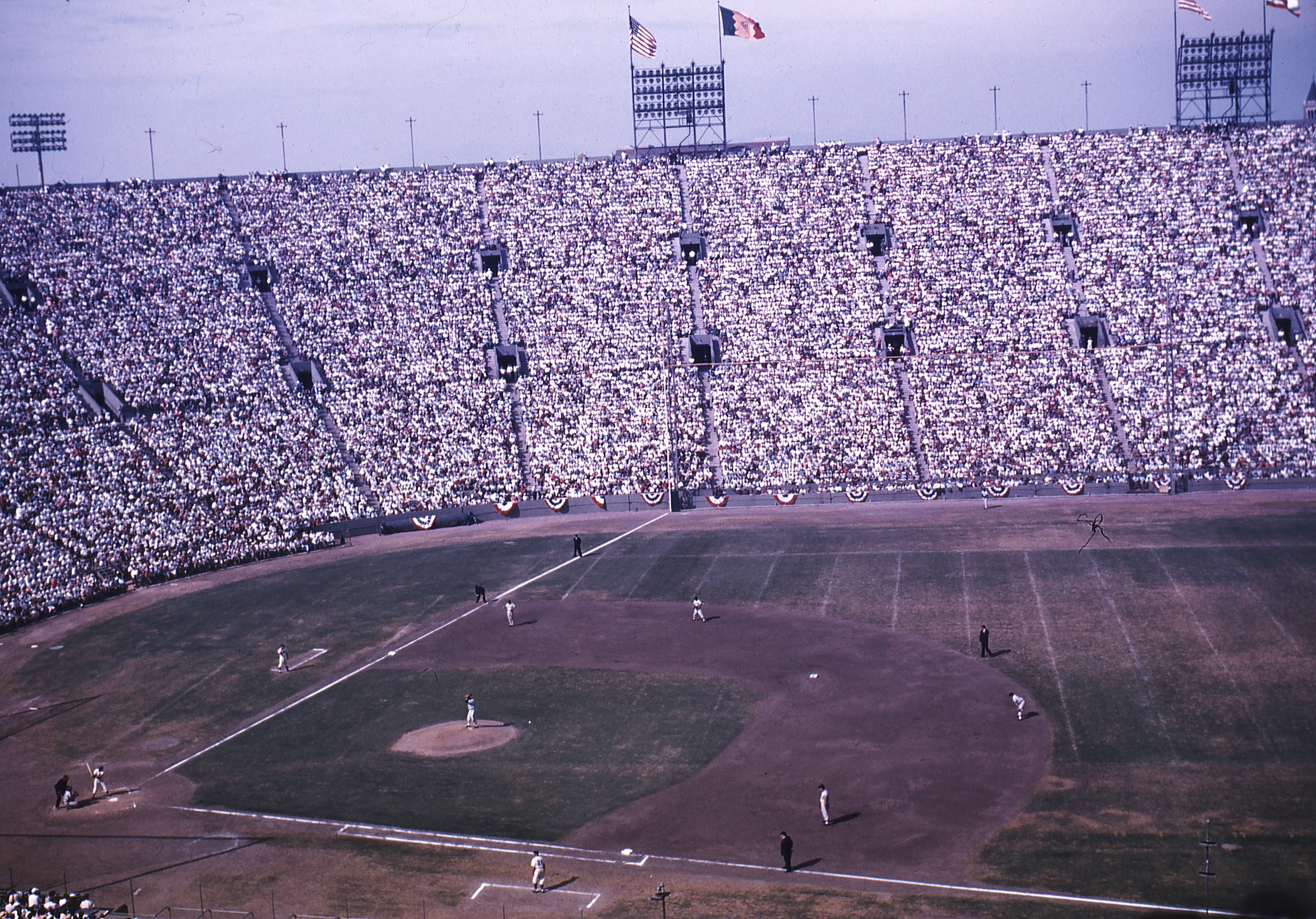
Built originally for college football and the Olympics, the oval-shaped Los Angeles Memorial Coliseum became the temporary home of the relocated Dodgers in 1958.

The expansion teams of the 1960s led to the emergence of two distinct subsets of parks in the major leagues: temporary ballparks and converted ballparks.

Temporary ballparks were used when a new ballpark was planned for an expansion team or moving franchise, but was not completed. This occurred for a few reasons, such as delays or a desire to hold off until the deal is settled. In this case, an established building is used as a temporary home, often a minor league park. The first temporary ballparks were not actually used by expansion teams but by established franchises. When the Dodgers and Giants moved to California from New York, they played in Los Angeles Memorial Coliseum and Seals Stadium respectively while Dodger Stadium and Candlestick Park were being built.

Converted ballparks were an alternative to building an entirely new stadium. These parks were pre-existing minor league or college facility that were expanded to fit a major league team. Converted ballparks are distinct from football stadia that were converted to multi-purpose parks in that converted ballparks were originally built for baseball only, albeit for a non-major league level. Early converted ballparks were Memorial Stadium in Baltimore, Municipal Stadium in Kansas City, and Metropolitan Stadium in Bloomington, Minnesota. All three were expanded minor league facilities, although Baltimore and the Met were constructed with the idea of expanding to major league level in mind. Kansas City was a true established minor league park that was substantially expanded to accommodate major league size crowds.

Temporary ballparks made a comeback in 2020, when Sahlen Field was used as a temporary MLB facility by the Toronto Blue Jays in the 2020 season and 2021 season due to Canada's travel restrictions following the outbreak of COVID-19, which prevented them from playing in the Rogers Centre.

Sutter Health Park is the temporary home of the Athletics from 2025 to 2027 leading up to the franchise's move to Las Vegas.

After extensive damage to Tropicana Field by Hurricane Milton, Steinbrenner Field served as the temporary home field for the Tampa Bay Rays during their 2025 season.

These two types of ballpark are distinct because of their use, not their design. Because of this, a temporary or converted ballpark can also be any of the other types: jewel box, modern, multi-purpose, etc.

Note: Only temporary ballparks that were used for an entire MLB season and more are listed. All converted ballparks are listed.

==== Major League Baseball (MLB) ====
Ballpark	Location	Team	Opened	Closed	Demo'd	Current status
Arlington Stadium	Arlington, Texas	Rangers	1965	1993	1994	Now parking for Choctaw Stadium; the National Medal of Honor Museum occupies parts of the site.
Colt Stadium	Houston	Colt .45's	1962	1964	1970	Dismantled and rebuilt in Mexico as Mexican League park.
George M. Steinbrenner Field	Tampa	Rays	1996	—	—	Active. Temporary home of the Rays for the 2025 season.
Jarry Park Stadium	Montreal	Expos	1969	1976	1993	Reconfigured into a tennis venue now known as Stade IGA.
Kansas City Municipal Stadium	Kansas City, Missouri	Athletics; Royals	1923	1972	1976	Now a municipal garden, along with residential homes.
Los Angeles Memorial Coliseum	Los Angeles	Dodgers	1923	—	—	Active; closed for baseball in 1961. Holds the baseball world record attendance when 115,300 attended a pre-season exhibition game between the Dodgers and Boston Red Sox on March 29, 2008.
Memorial Stadium	Baltimore	Orioles	1950	1997	2001	Now residential.
Metropolitan Stadium	Bloomington, Minnesota	Twins	1956	1981	1985	Now site of the Mall of America.
Mile High Stadium	Denver	Rockies	1948	2001	2002	Originally a minor-league baseball stadium in 1948. Now parking for Empower Field at Mile High.
Sahlen Field	Buffalo	Blue Jays	1988	—	—	Active. Former temporary home of the Blue Jays during the 2020 and 2021 seasons.
Seals Stadium	San Francisco	Giants	1931	1959	1959	Now a shopping center.
Sick's Stadium	Seattle	Pilots	1938	1976	1979	Now a Lowe's store.
Sutter Health Park	West Sacramento	Athletics	2000	—	—	Active. Temporary home of the Athletics for the 2025, 2026, and 2027 seasons.
Wrigley Field	Los Angeles	Angels	1925	1965	1966	Now site of Gilbert Lindsay Park.

==== Nippon Professional Baseball (NPB) ====
Ballpark	Location	Team	Opened	Closed	Demo'd	Current status
Heiwadai Stadium	Fukuoka	Nishitetsu Lions (Note: Also briefly home of the Nishi Nippon Pirates, which merged after the 1950 season to create the Lions, and the Fukuoka Daiei Hawks.)	1949	1997	1998	Now open space. Parts of the outfield walls still stand, and a commemorative plaque marks the former main entrance.

== See also ==
- List of baseball parks by capacity
- List of Major League Baseball stadiums
- List of U.S. baseball stadiums by capacity
- List of terraces at baseball venues
- All-you-can-eat seats
- Scoreboard
