= Shitennoji Gakuen Junior and Senior High School =

School in Fujiidera, Japan

Coordinates: 34.5711°N 135.5911°E

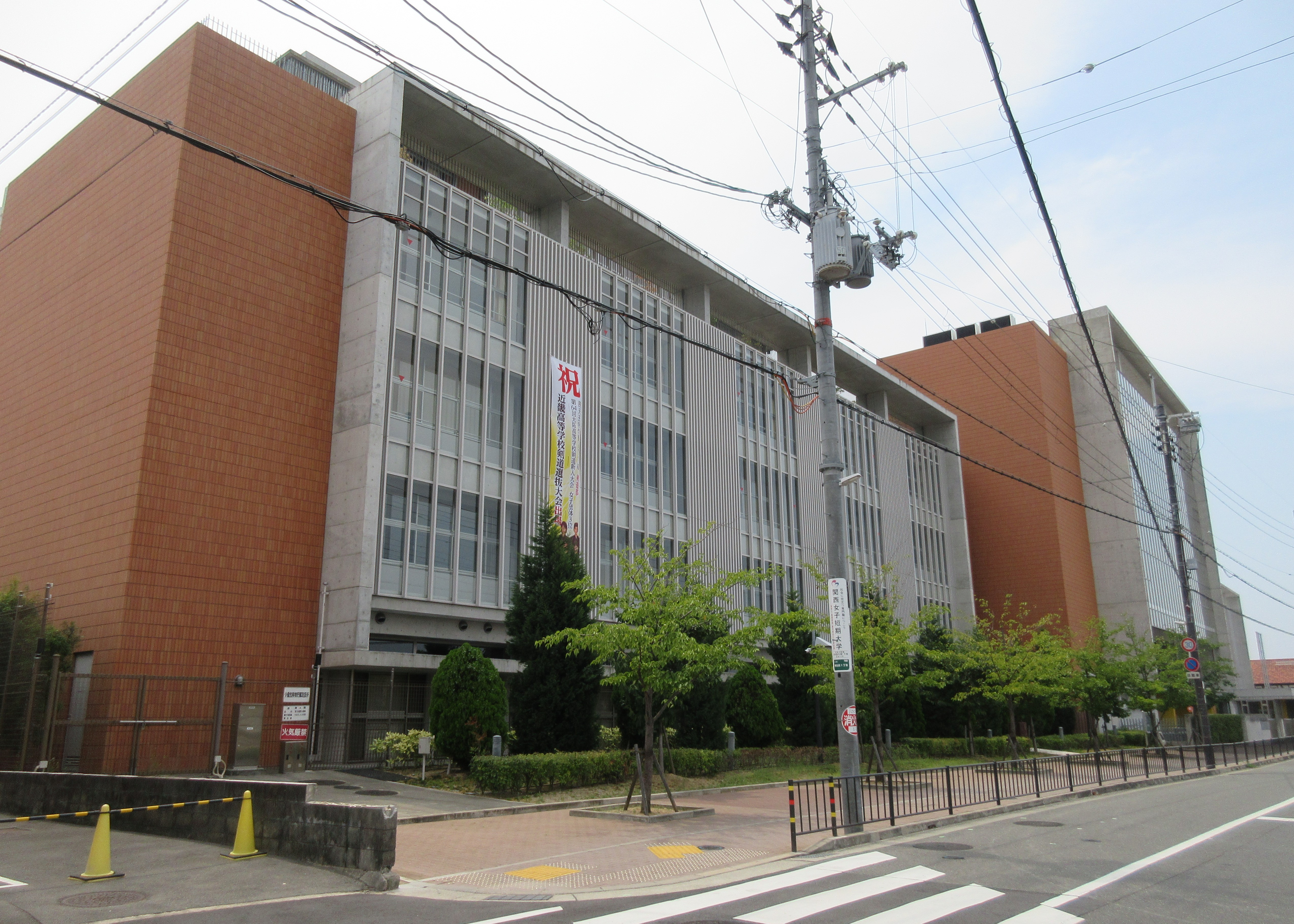
Shitennoji Gakuen Junior and Senior High School

Shitennoji Gakuen Junior and Senior High School (四天王寺学園中学校・高等学校, Shitennōji Gakuen Chūgakkō Kōtōgakkō) is a private junior and senior high school in Fujiidera, Osaka Prefecture. It is a part of the Shi-Tennoji Gakuen, a group of Buddhist educational institutions affiliated with Shitennoji temple in Osaka.

The school opened as a junior high school in April 2014, and the senior high school division opened in 2017.
