= National Medal of Honor Museum =

Museum in Arlington, Texas, US

- Established: March 25, 2025; 17 months ago
- Location: Arlington, Texas
- Coordinates: 32°45′16″N 97°05′05″W
- Type: Military history
- Collections: Medal of Honor
- President: Chris Cassidy
- Website: mohmuseum.org

The National Medal of Honor Museum is a museum that honors United States Armed Forces Medal of Honor recipients, founded and funded by the National Medal of Honor Museum Foundation. Groundbreaking began in March 2022 in Arlington, Texas. Previously, the group decided to build the museum in Patriots Point in Mount Pleasant, South Carolina, but decided on Arlington later.

The location was announced on October 4, 2019, concluding a 5-year, nationwide competition that included Denver, New York City, San Diego, and Washington, D.C. It was projected to cost $150 million and open in 2024.

The museum officially opened on March 25, 2025.

== History ==
=== Planning ===
Initially, the museum was planned for a location in Mount Pleasant, South Carolina. A design for the museum by Moshe Safdie faced much regulatory scrutiny and criticism by the Mount Pleasant Town Council planning committee. In late 2018, the Foundation decided to seek alternate sites for the museum.

In October 2019, Arlington, Texas, was selected as the location for the National Medal of Honor Museum. The museum is meant to recognize Medal of Honor recipients and include the National Medal of Honor Museum Leadership Institute, an education center aimed at character development for young people.

In January 2020, Rafael Viñoly was selected as chief architect for the museum. The first renderings for the museum were revealed that October.

The Foundation has also worked to place a corresponding National Medal of Honor Monument on the National Mall in Washington, D.C. A bill authorizing the Foundation to construct the monument passed unanimously in the House and Senate; in late 2021, President Joe Biden signed it into law.

=== Fundraising ===
The Foundation has a fundraising goal of nearly $200 million to build the museum in Arlington. The project is funded by private donations. No federal funds will be used to support the construction of the museum or the monument. In March 2021, American businessman and Dallas Cowboys owner Jerry Jones made a $20 million donation to help build the museum.

=== Construction ===
The site for the museum is in Arlington's entertainment district, near the Dallas Cowboys' AT&T Stadium and Texas Rangers' Globe Life Field. On February 1, 2022, the Foundation announced it would break ground on the museum on National Medal of Honor Day 2022 – March 25, 2022. The General Contractor for the museum was Linbeck Group, LLC.

=== Controversy ===
Online petitions seek to have MSgt John Chapman featured in one of the 200 stand-alone exhibits and criticize the decision to exclude him, the recipient first medal of honor incident captured on camera, in favor of the story of a board member who was also there at Robert's Ridge but has a controversial past with allegations of war crimes.

== Foundation ==
The National Medal of Honor Museum Foundation is a 501(c)(3) organization charged with designing, funding, building and maintaining the museum. Chris Cassidy, former chief astronaut for NASA and a retired U.S. Navy SEAL, is the museum's president and CEO. Charlotte Jones, executive vice president and chief brand officer for the Dallas Cowboys, is chairman of the board for the museum.

Presidents Barack Obama, George W. Bush, Bill Clinton and Jimmy Carter (before his death) are "Honorary Directors" of the Foundation. In November 2021, Presidents Obama, Bush and Clinton appeared in a public service announcement in support of building the museum.

== See also ==
- Texas Medal of Honor Memorial
- Texas Legislative Medal of Honor
