= Lin Tian =

Biochemist

- Occupation: Scientific Director

Academic background
- Education: Northwestern University

Academic work
- Discipline: Neuroscience
- Institutions: Max Planck Florida Institute for Neuroscience

Lin Tian is a Chinese-American neuroscientist and biochemist. She is a Scientific Director of the Max Planck Florida Institute for Neuroscience in Jupiter, FL, and was formerly a professor in the Department of Biochemistry and Molecular Medicine at the University of California, Davis. Tian is known for her research in the fields of neuroscience and biochemical engineering. She develops and applies molecular tools to understand brain function and dysfunction at the individual, neuronal level.

== Early life and education ==
Tian received her Ph.D. in biochemistry, Molecular and Cellular Biology at Northwestern University, where she studied the mechanism of protein processing by the proteasome. Her graduate advisor was Andreas Matouschek.

From 2007 to 2009, Tian was a postdoctoral scholar at the Howard Hughes Medical Institute's (HHMI) Janelia Research Campus, working with Loren Looger and Karel Svoboda. During this time, Tian began her work on the development of tools for enhanced neuronal imaging and cell-specific labeling. She created protein-based tools, including improved GCaMP indicators, for studying and manipulating the brain and other biological samples.

== Career and research ==
Tian started her lab at UC Davis in 2012 as an assistant professor, later becoming a Professor and Vice Chair. In October 2023, she became a Scientific Director at the Max Planck Florida Institute for Neuroscience.

Tian is best known for creating a new classes of genetically encoded indicators for detecting neurotransmitters and neuromodulators, such as serotonin and dopamine. She and her team use molecular scaffolds and computational modeling to create the biosensors, which can dynamically map neurotransmitter flow in the brain. These tools are distributed through UNC NeuroTools and Addgene. Her work has implications for drug discovery, aiding in the identification of new therapeutic targets.

She also worked with David E. Olson and developed a method to identify the hallucinogenic potential of psychedelic compounds. They engineered psychLight5, a “sensor that glows in the presence of a hallucinogenic compound when it interacts with a serotonin receptor." In 2024, her lab released a new series of opioid sensors.

== Awards and honors ==
- W.M. Keck Foundation Research Award (2022); joint with Na Ji
- Rita Allen Young Investigator Award (2016)
- NIH Director's Innovator Award (2014)
