= Abacoa, Florida =

Abacoa
- Planned Urban Development
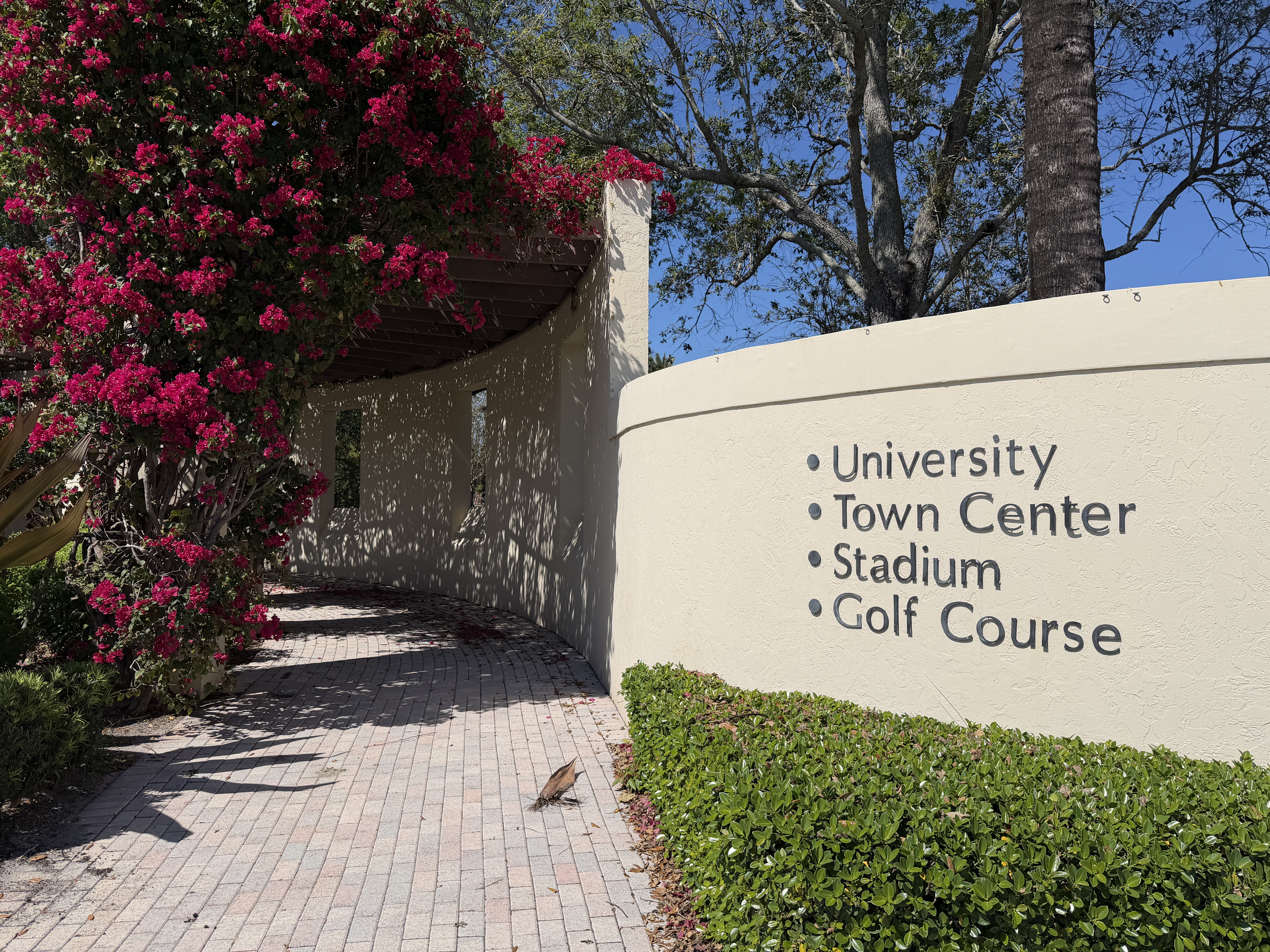
- Entrance to Abacoa from Donald Ross

- Location in Florida
- Coordinates: 26°53′27″N 80°06′52″W
- Country: United States
- State: Florida
- County: Palm Beach
- Elevation: 105 ft (32 m)
- Time zone: UTC-5 (Eastern (EST))
  - Summer (DST): UTC-4 (EDT)
- ZIP code: 33458
- Area code: 561

Abacoa is a community in Palm Beach County in the U.S. state of Florida, in the southwest corner of Jupiter. Construction began in 1997 on land once owned by the American businessman John D. MacArthur. The development is an example of the New Urbanism architectural movement in Florida.

== History ==
Abacoa was conceived in 1993, when the MacArthur Foundation proposed the plan to the county of Palm Beach, to be executed on land from MacArthur's endowment previously leased for strawberry farming. The Foundation opted to partner with a developer, maintaining a 35% minority stake in the project.

Initial home sales were brisk, with 4,000 of 6,000 units built as of 2009. However, tenancy of retail spaces in Abacoa Town Center were sluggish, with a third of 40-some storefronts, as well as the center's movie theater, shuttered as of 2007 and now a Marriott Courtyard hotel. The center was acquired by a new owner who subsequently fully leased the town center and created a thriving retail environment.

The name derives from that of a village of the Jaega tribe of Native Americans, who were present in the area at the time of Spanish contact.

== Culture ==
Since 2002, Abacoa has hosted the annual Fiesta Maya, based on the traditions of the highland Guatemala town of Jacaltenango, with the participation of the local Jacaltec community as well as students from Florida Atlantic University's Harriet L. Wilkes Honors College.

There are community events in the town center on holidays, e.g., St. Patrick's Day, July 4th, and Halloween. Abacoa hosts the Feast of Little Italy for one weekend each year, typically in November. The Abacoa Property Owners' Association maintains a comprehensive calendar of downtown Abacoa events.

== Public Schools ==
Abacoa is served by Palm Beach County Public Schools: the Lighthouse Elementary School (K-2), Beacon Cove Intermediate School (3-5), Independence Middle School (6-8), Jupiter Middle School (6-8), Jupiter High, and William T. Dwyer High School (assignment to middle and high school varies by neighborhood, though a choice program is available for students who have a preference). Florida Atlantic University High School has an Abacoa campus and offers a simultaneous high school and bachelor's degree. Palm Beach County runs magnet schools for students with specialized interests and abilities. These include programs within standard schools as well as standalone magnet schools such as the Alexander W. Dreyfoos School of the Arts and Suncoast, a school with a focus on math, science, and engineering.

== Recreation ==
Abacoa is home to a community park, which includes a football field, playground, basketball area, and skate park. Abacoa has four clay tennis courts, free to use on a first-come first-served basis. The Abacoa Golf Club is a public 18-hole course. It's a 12-minute drive to the Juno Beach Pier along Donald Ross Road. Jupiter's own beach, which starts just north of the Juno Beach Pier, is popular for kiteboarding.

== Shopping ==
The Abacoa Town Center is home to multiple restaurants, a coffee shop, a barber shop, dance and martial arts studios, an escape room, and a handful of specialty stores (as of 2024, these included a bridal shop, a bicycle shop, and a trading card store). Major retailers on the edges of Abacoa include CVS and a Publix supermarket. Home Depot is across Donald Ross Rd. from Abacoa in the Alton Mall.

== Employers ==
Major employers near Abacoa include Florida Power & Light/NextEra (US HQ), Carrier (global HQ), Aerojet Rocketdyne, Florida Atlantic University, Max Planck Institute, UF Scripps, Jupiter Medical Center, Cleveland Clinic, Zimmer Biomet, and PSM (a Jupiter-founded division of Hanwha that does gas turbine work).

== Health Care ==
Routine health care is available within Abacoa, e.g., eye exams, dentistry, urgent care affiliated with the Jupiter Medical Center (within the Abacoa Plaza that contains Publix), and a veterinarian. Primary care from the Cleveland Clinic is available across Donald Ross Road. The Jupiter Medical Center community hospital is 3.6 miles away from the Abacoa Town Center. The Palm Beach Gardens Medical community hospital is 6.4 miles away. The Alan B. Miller Medical Center, a hospital opening in 2026, is 2.8 miles away.

== Transportation ==
Depending on the neighborhood, a house in Abacoa is 1-3 miles from an entrance to Interstate 95. Commercial airline service is a 22-minute drive away at PBI, a one-hour drive away at FLL, and a 1.5-hour drive away at MIA. General aviation facilities are available at PBI, at F45, and a 30-minute drive away at the Stuart, Florida airport. Abacoa is served by the PalmTrans #10 bus, which runs from the West Jupiter Recreation Center to the (Palm Beach) Gardens Mall where transfers may be made to additional bus routes. The closest commuter rail station is a 15-minute drive away in Mangonia Park and the train there goes to the Miami International Airport. The closest intercity rail is Brightline in downtown West Palm Beach, a 25-minute drive, which travels between Miami and Orlando. An AMTRAK station is also available in West Palm Beach, with direct trains connecting to Tampa, Chicago, Washington, D.C., and New York City.

== Planning ==
Abacoa is split into 17 different neighborhoods, each containing its own style of architecture. At peak, management anticipates Abacoa will contain 6,073 residences, and about 3,000,000 square feet (280,000 m^{2}) of commercial space.

One consistent feature among the neighborhoods is that garages are typically served by alleys and, thus, the fronts of the houses are not dominated by garage doors.

Abacoa is also home to Roger Dean Stadium, which is located near the Town Center part of the community, an urban open air street with multiple restaurants. Abacoa is also home to Florida Atlantic University's Harriet L. Wilkes Honors College, a Scripps Research Institute sister facility, and the Max Planck Florida Institute for Neuroscience, the Max Planck Society's first non-European research institute.

== Greenways ==
According to the EPA, Abacoa includes "393 acres of preserved open space includes parks throughout Abacoa’s neighborhoods and a 260-acre greenway that protects the ecosystem of wetlands and pine woods, 60 acres of which are set aside as an endangered gopher tortoise habitat." The EPA adds that "In addition to providing wildlife habitat, recreation, and educational opportunities, Abacoa’s greenways and lakes manage stormwater runoff from the entire community. The greenways capture rainfall, allowing it to slowly seep into the ground instead of running off the surface."

Signage within the Greenway explains how the approach differs from earlier suburban developments in Florida.

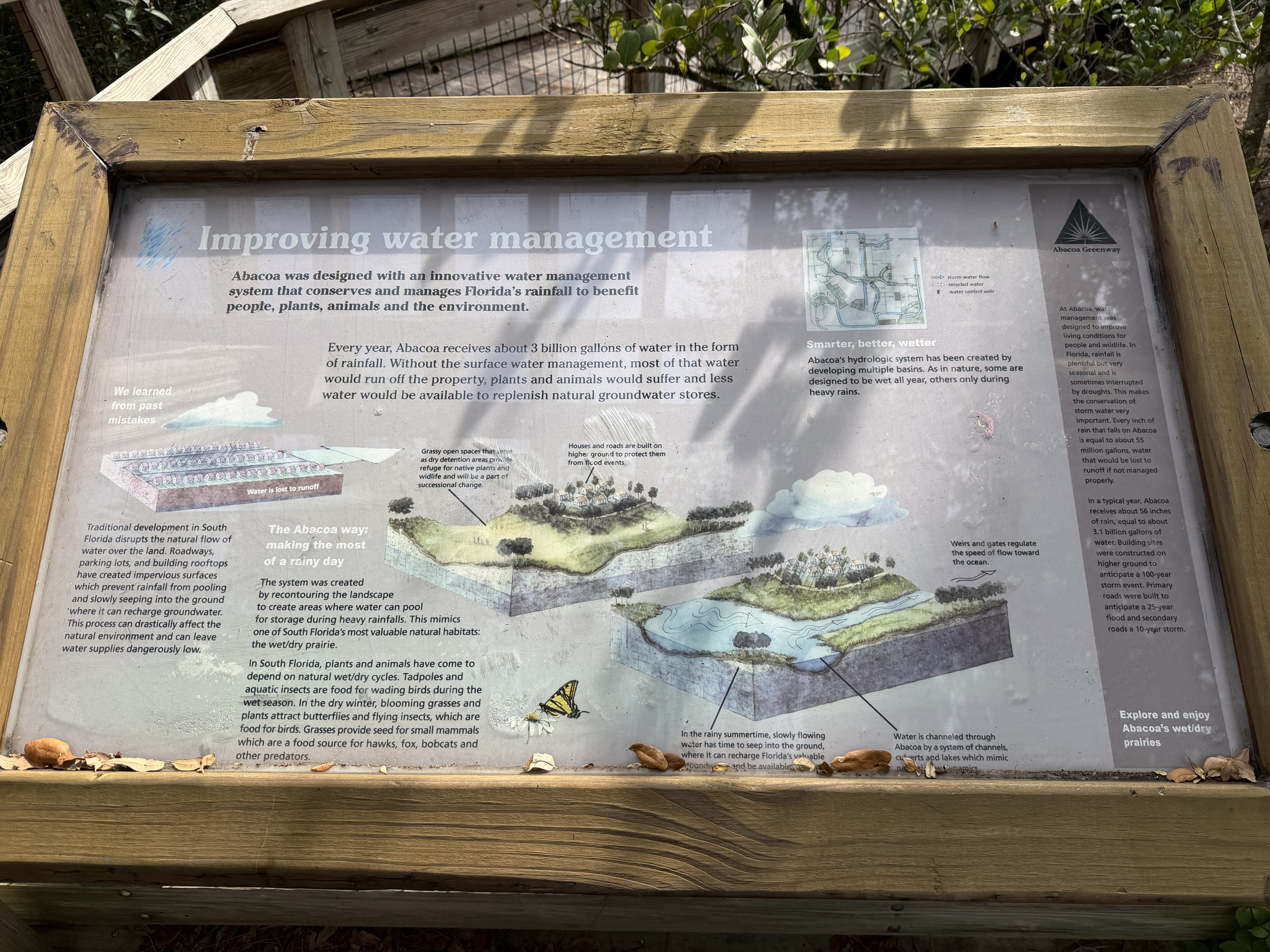

The bad old days vs. Abacoa:

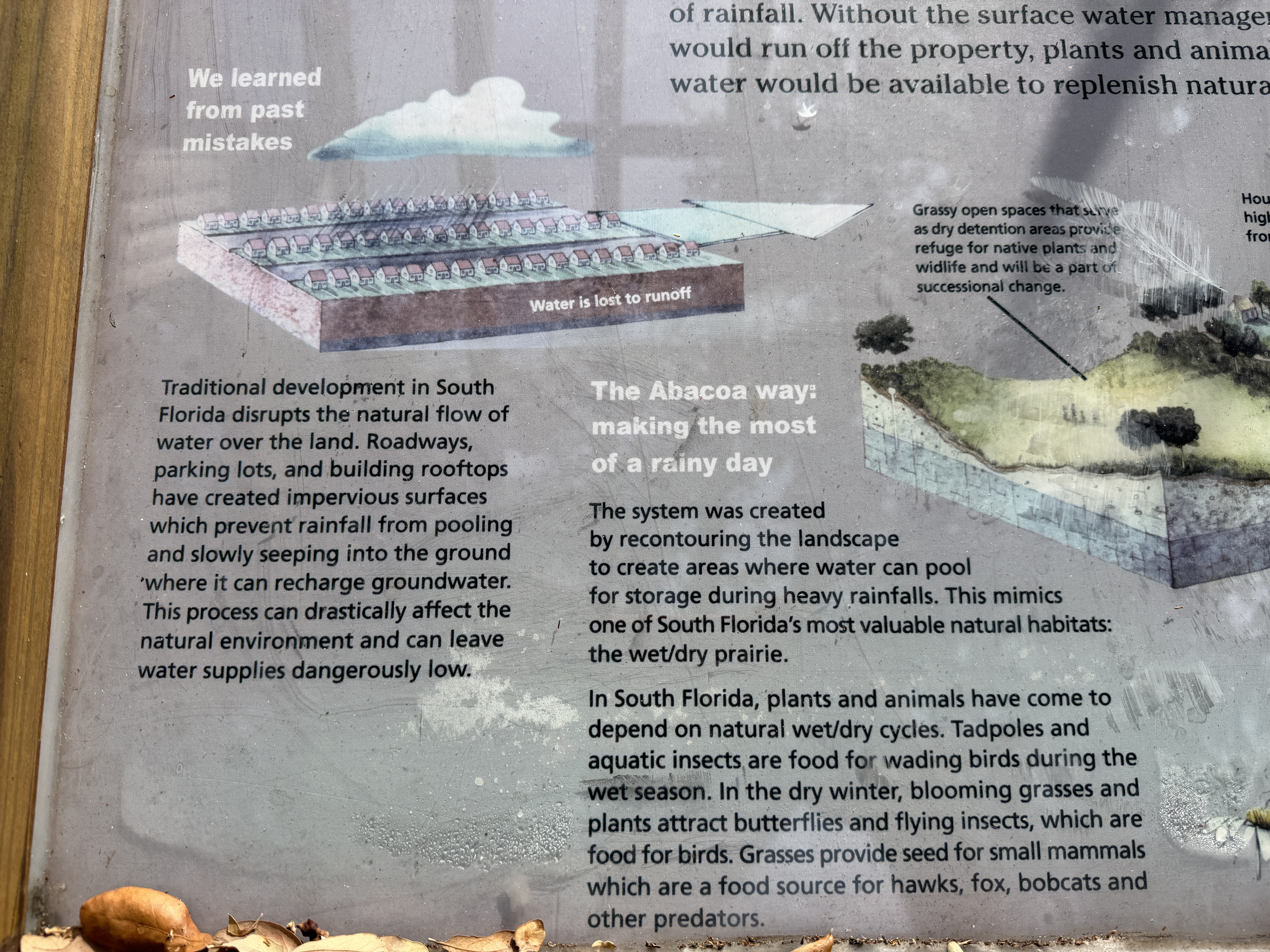
☢

The engineering standard:

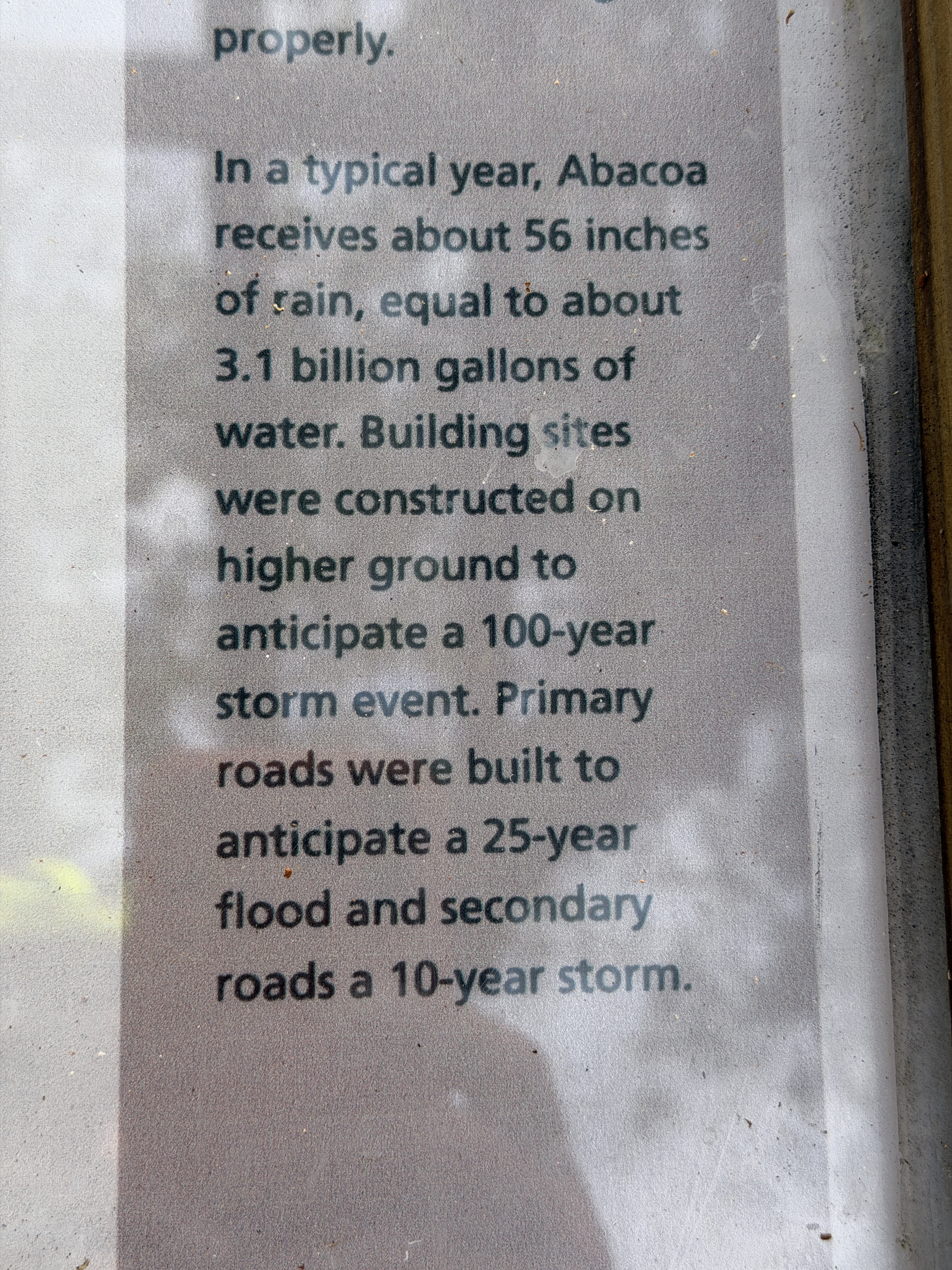
☢

A map of the Greenway:

== Neighborhoods ==
As of 2024, the neighborhoods of Abacoa were the following, listed in order of approximate distance from "downtown":

- Abacoa Town Center, which includes restaurants, retail, a hotel, office space, the Roger Dean Stadium, and the Allure rental apartment complex (built 2016)
- Antigua, mostly town houses, some of which are zoned for live/work
- Osceola Woods, 146 three-story townhouses
- The Island at Abacoa, single-family homes and townhouses organized around the Abacoa Golf Club an 18-hole course
- Charleston Court, townhouses organized around the golf course
- The Sophia, a rental apartment complex
- Tuscany, a mixture of single-family homes and townhouses
- Martinique, a mixture of single-family homes and townhouses
- Mallory Creek, a mixture of single-family homes and townhouses in a Key West style
- Valencia, limited to single-family homes in a Spanish Colonial Revival Style; no fiber Internet except for one street (Segovia)
- Somerset, townhouse and apartments organized around a pool, clubhouse, and gym; next to the Lighthouse Elementary School (grades K-2) and Jupiter Middle School (grades 6-8)
- The Dakota, a rental apartment complex
- Cambridge, a mixture of single-family homes and townhouses
- Windsor Park, a mixture of single-family homes and townhouses and home to Addington Place of Jupiter, a senior living center with independent, assisted, and memory care options
- San Palermo, a small area of townhouses with no common clubhouse, gym, or pool
- Canterbury Place, a mixture of single-family homes and townhouses
- Greenwich, a small area along Military Trail
- New Haven, a mixture of single-family homes and townhouses next to the Beacon Cove Intermediate School (grades 3-5)

Unless otherwise noted, each neighborhood has its own clubhouse, gym, and pool. All houses are built from concrete blocks and the roofs may be tile, metal, or asphalt shingle, depending on the neighborhood.

== Internet Service and Cable TV ==
Nearly all of Abacoa was originally served by Comcast/Xfinity cable television, cable modem Internet, and AT&T copper wire phone lines. Most of the neighborhoods today also have the option of multi-gigabit symmetric fiber optic Internet from either Hotwire, based in Fort Lauderdale, or AT&T. Hotwire serves at least the following neighborhoods: The Island, Martinique, Tuscany, New Haven, Mallory Creek, and Somerset. AT&T fiber is available at least in Canterbury, and in downtown Abacoa, e.g., the Allure apartment building. Fiber Internet in Valencia is limited to one street (Segovia).

== Photos ==
A typical house in the Valencia neighborhood:

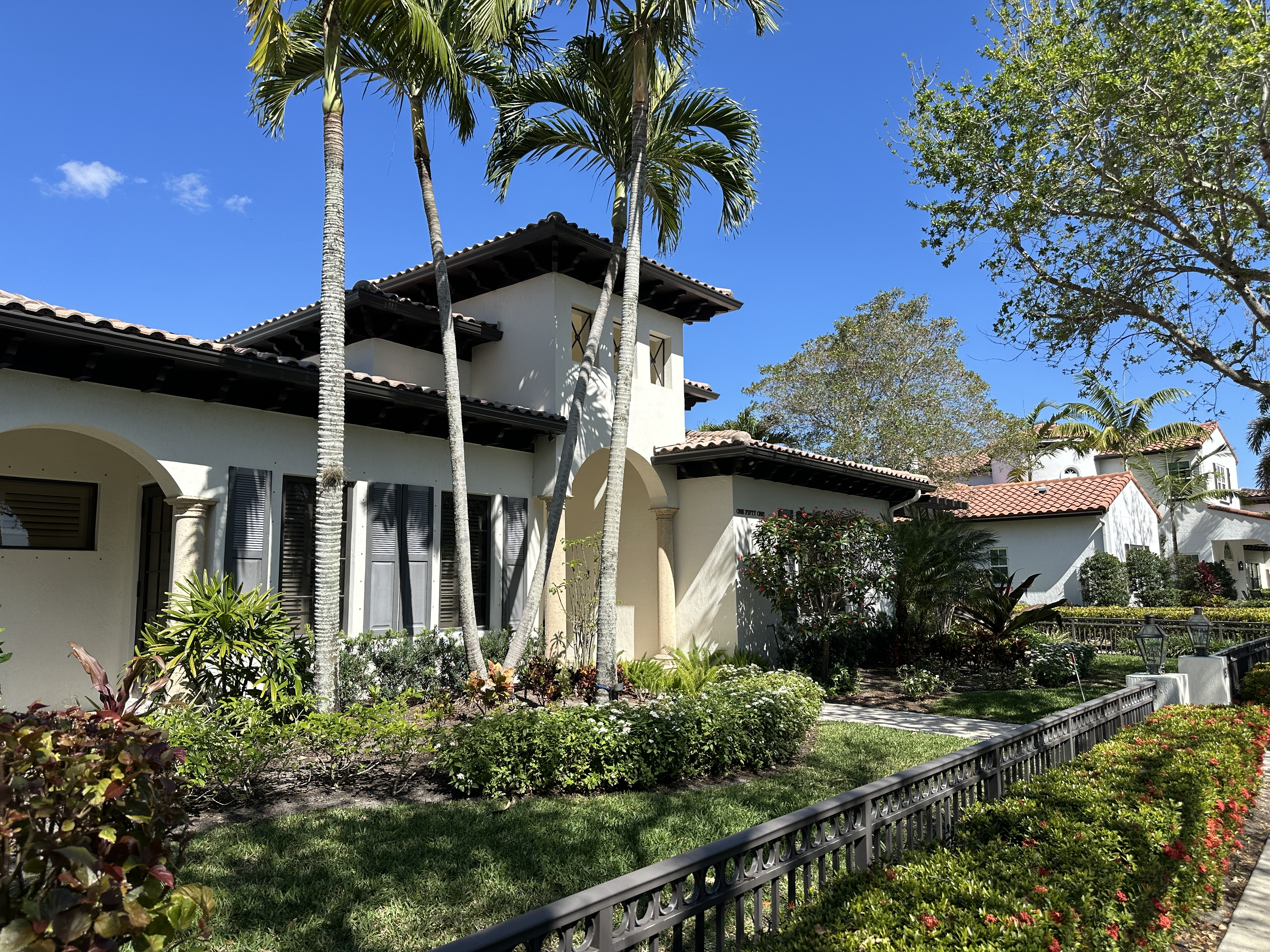
Valencia, Abacoa, Jupiter, Florida

The entrance to the Mallory Creek neighborhood:

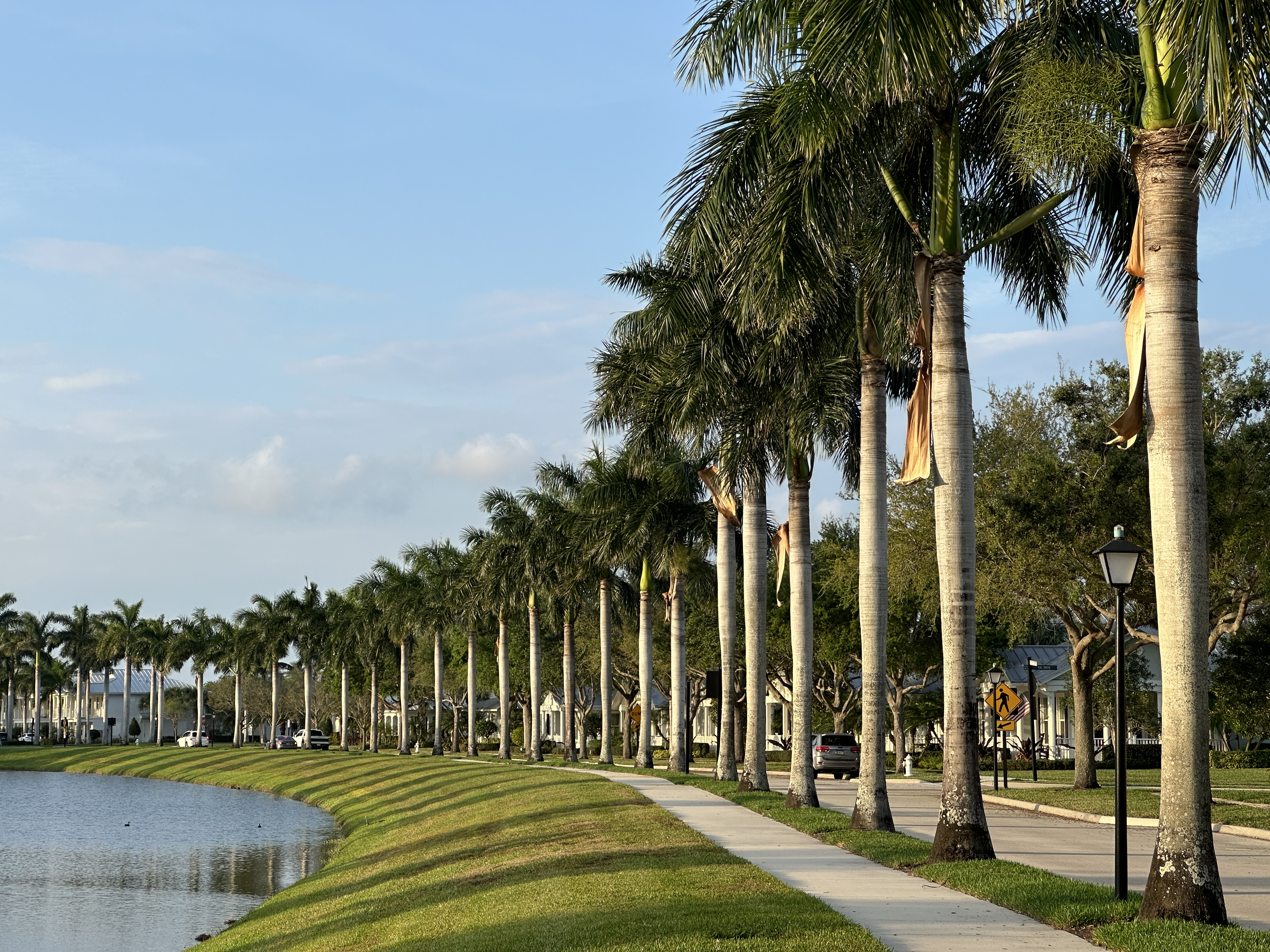
Looking north up E. Mallory Blvd at the Mallory Creek neighborhood of Abacoa.

Downtown Abacoa:

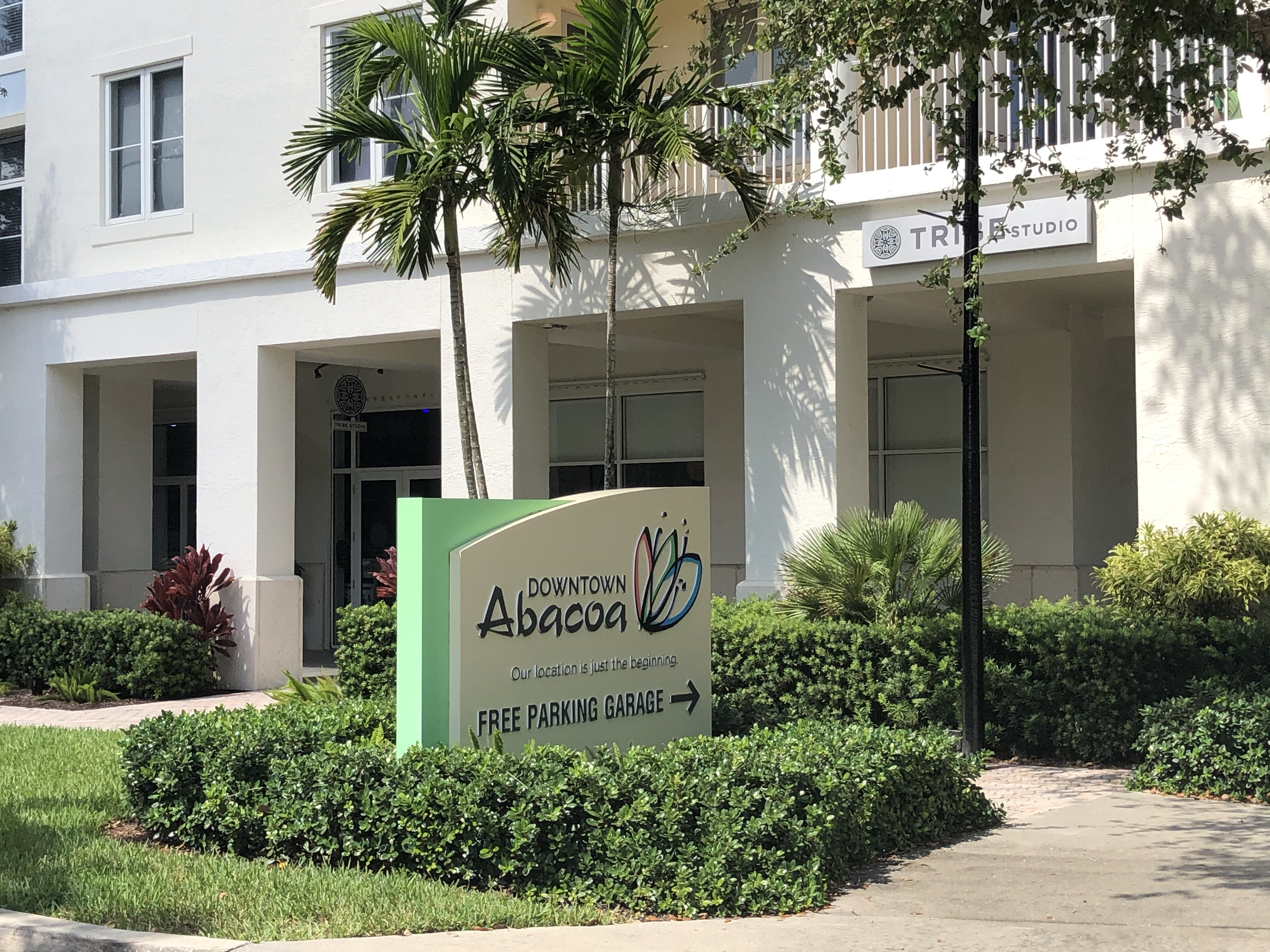

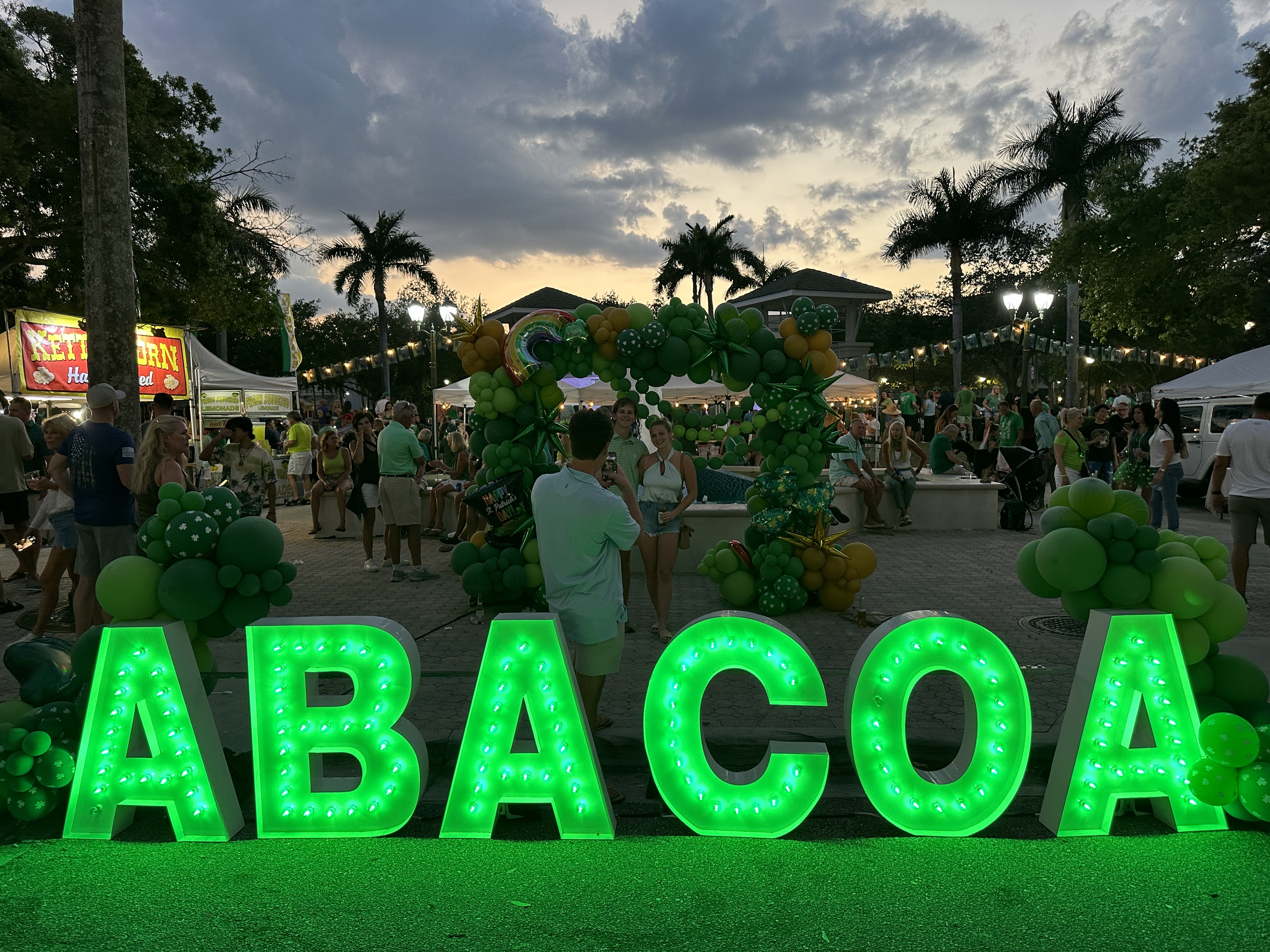
Irish Festival in the town center of Abacoa.

Antigua (all townhouses; near the town center and stadium):

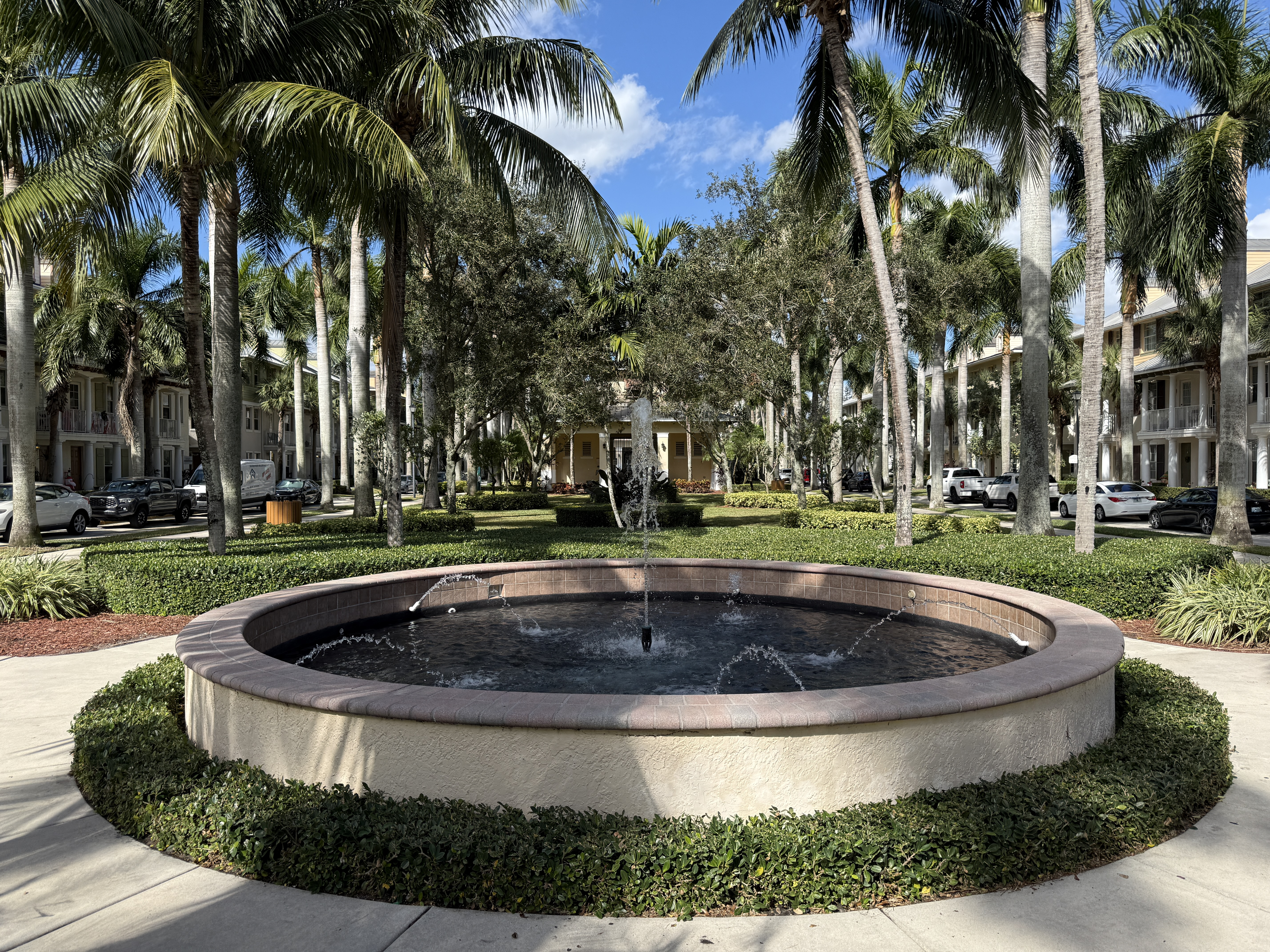

Herbert Wertheim UF Scripps Institute for Biomedical Innovation & Technology:

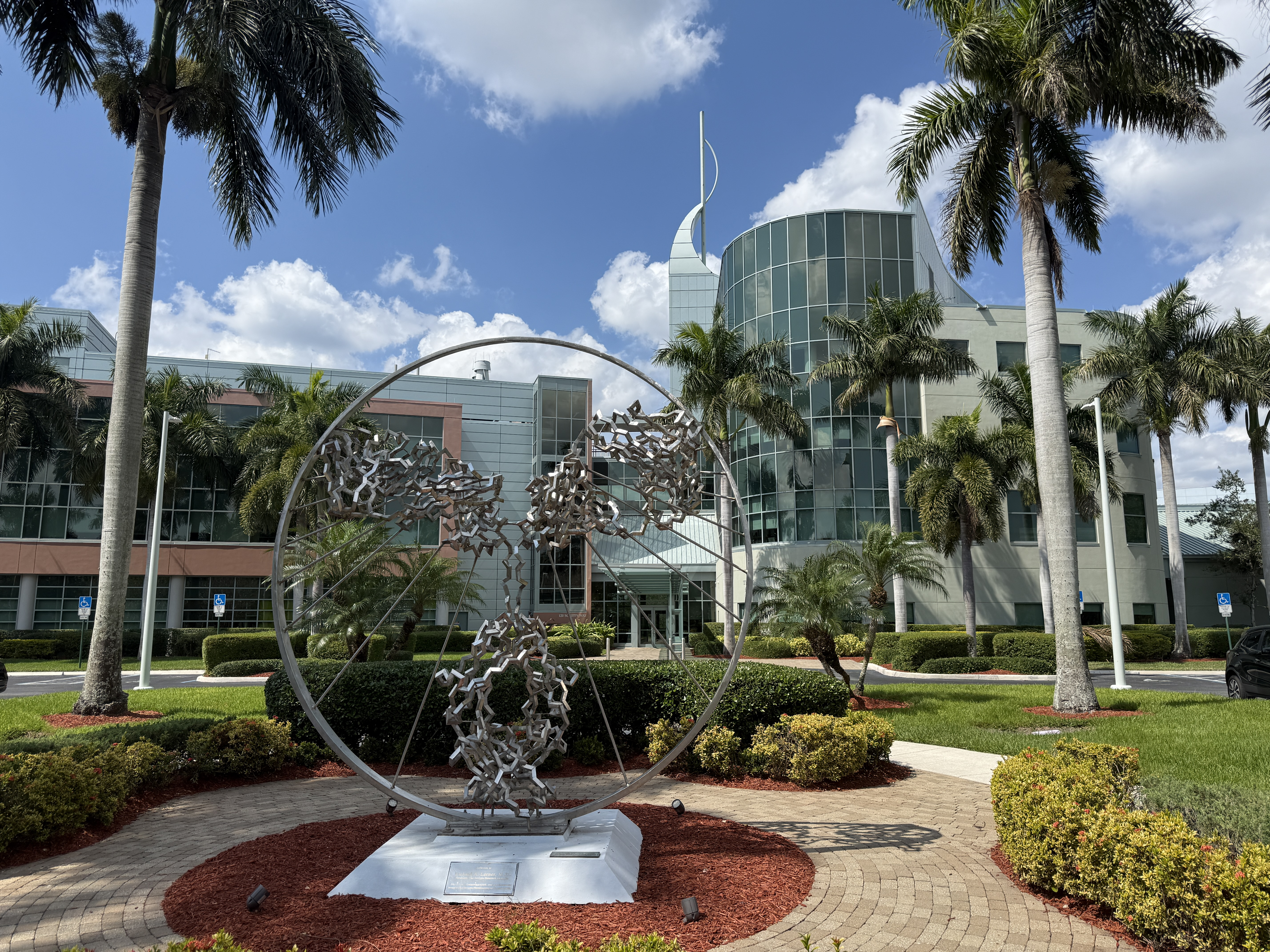

An entrance to the Martinique neighborhood:

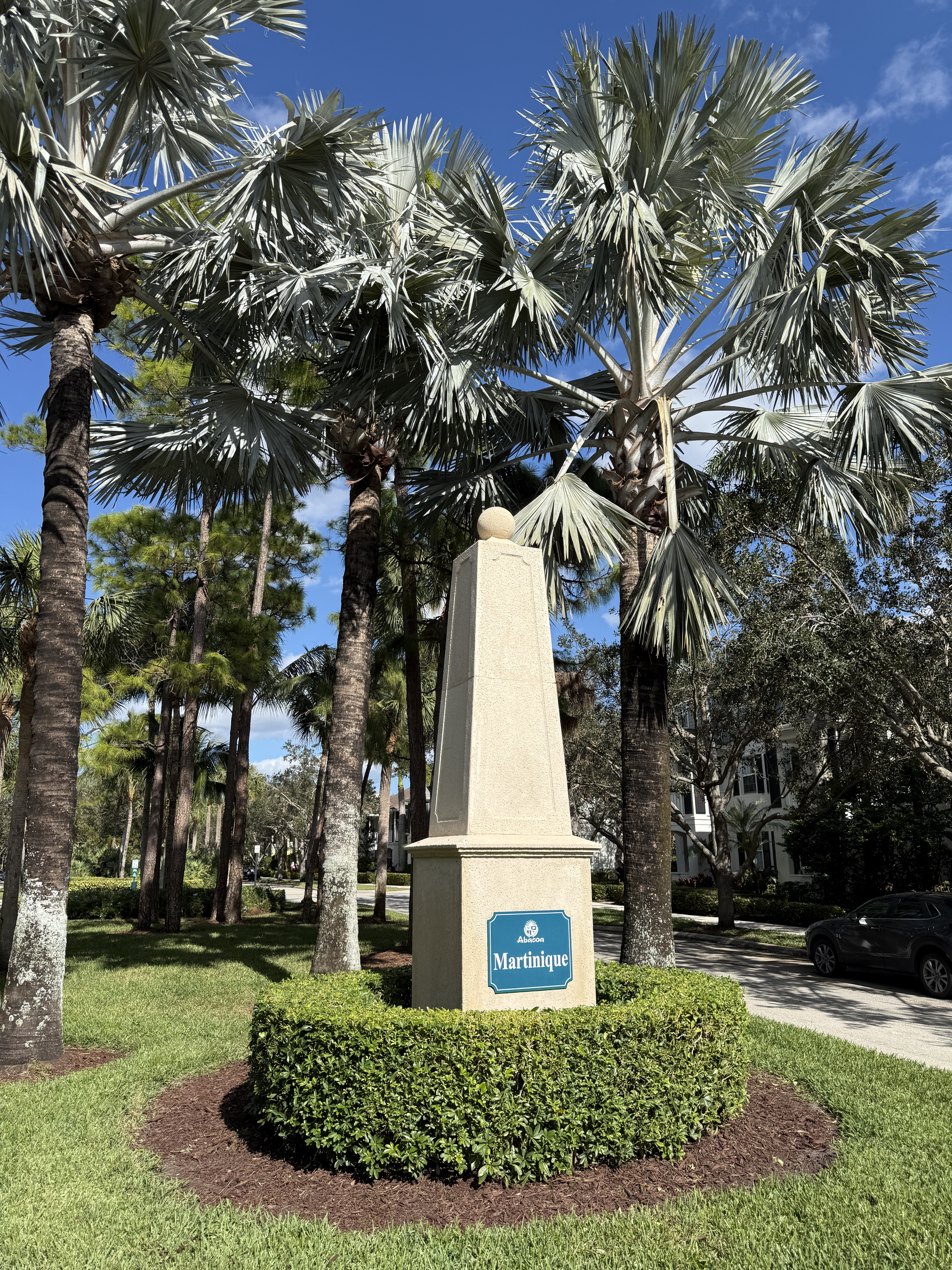

A typical Abacoa sidewalk, shaded (and littered with leaves) by mature oak trees:

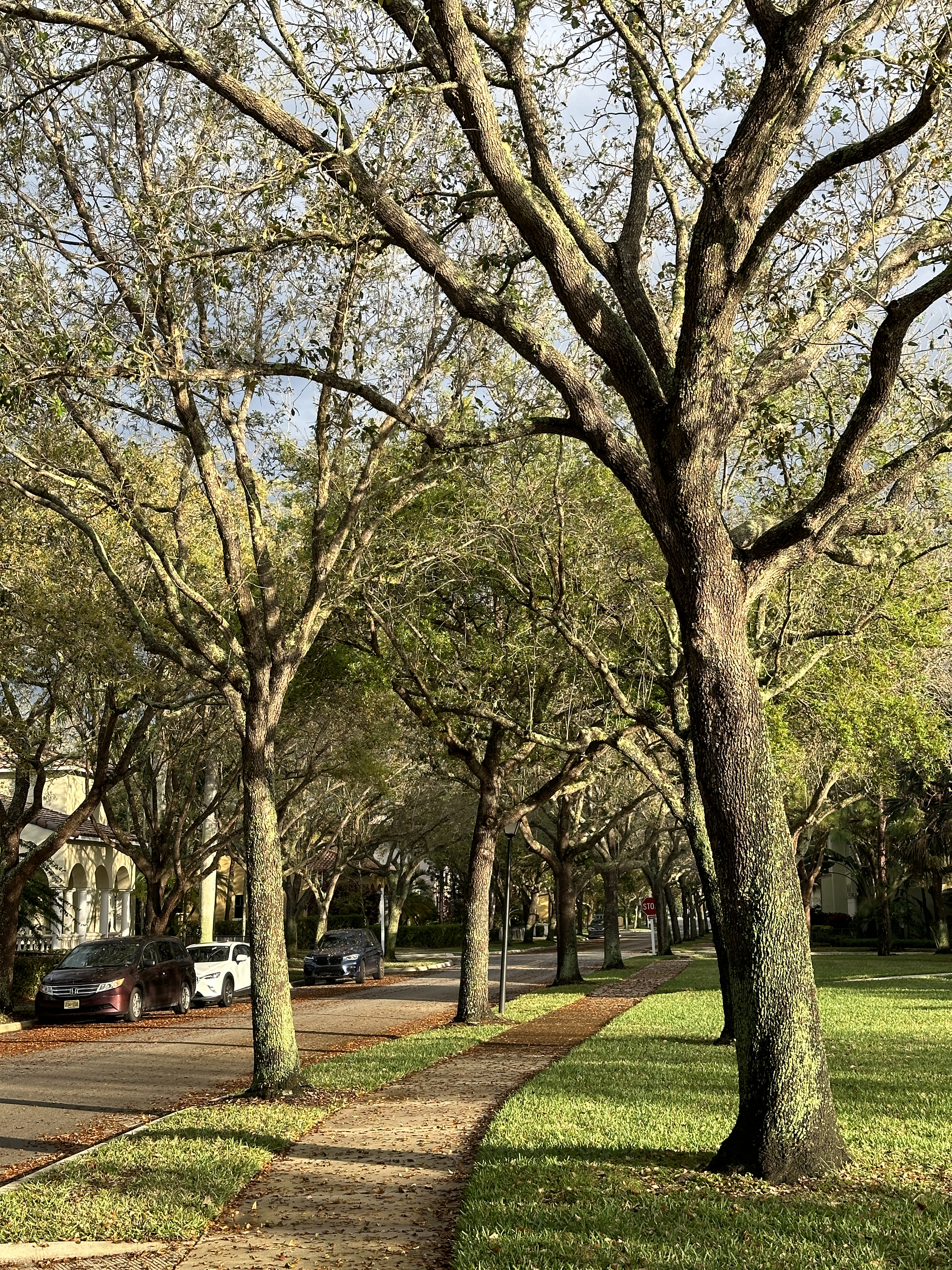
