= North Palm Beach Heights =

- Neighborhood
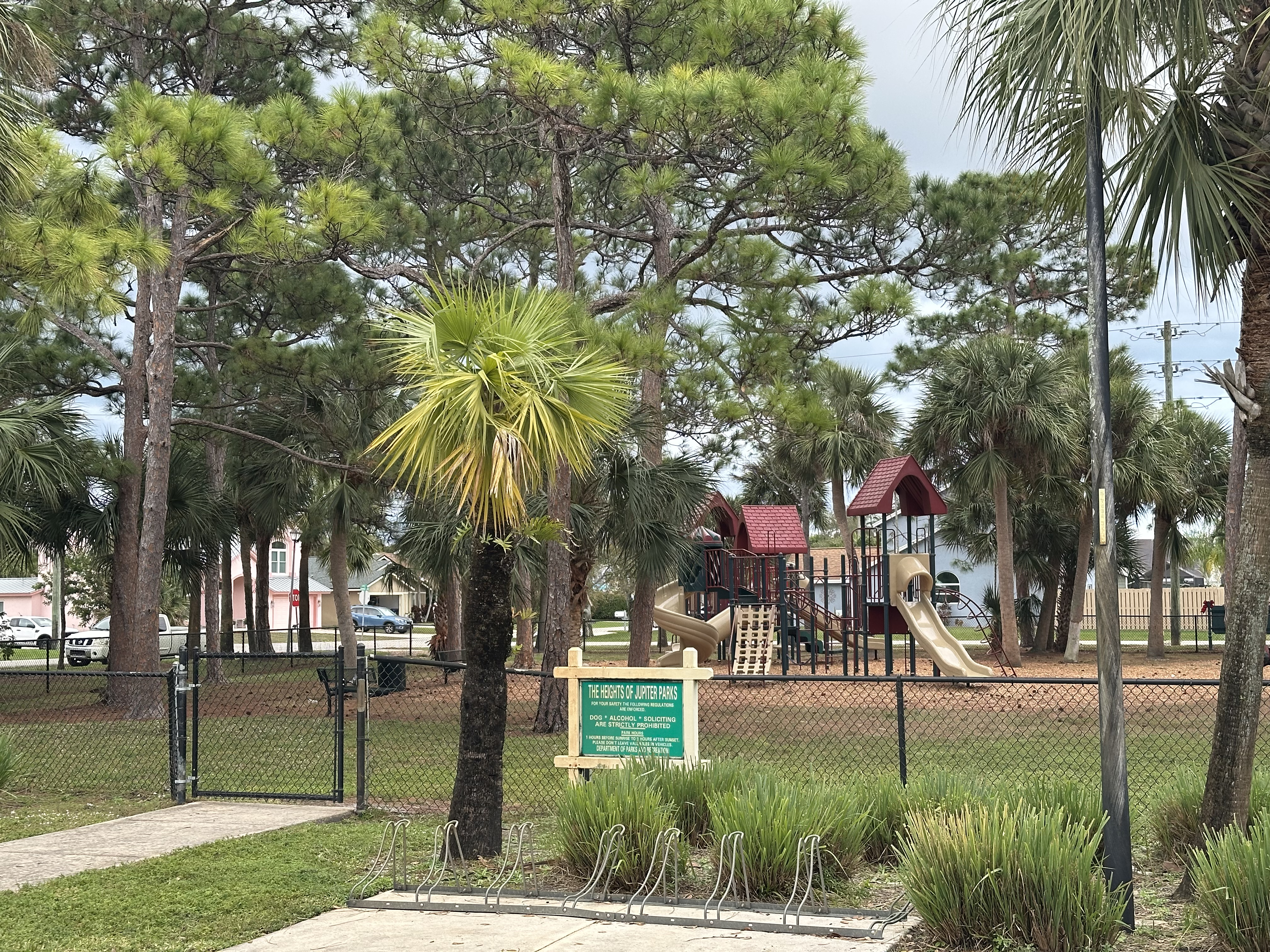
- Interactive map of North Palm Beach Heights
- Coordinates: 26°53′59.71″N 80°7′57.57″W
- Country: United States
- State: Florida
- Region: Palm Beach County
- District: Jupiter

North Palm Beach Heights is a residential subdivision in Jupiter, Florida. It is colloquially referred to as The Heights or The Heights of Jupiter due to its location within the town limits of Jupiter and to avoid confusion with the Village of North Palm Beach, Florida. The official subdivision name recorded with Palm Beach County, Florida is North Palm Beach Heights.

Located at latitude 26°53′59.71″N and longitude 80°7′57.57″W, The Heights is north of Donald Ross Road, west of Abacoa, south of Egret Landing and east of Interstate 95 in Palm Beach County, Florida. Ranch-style, single-family houses are the most prevalent homes, but there are some two-story homes, and in the southern end of the neighborhood there are some two-family duplexes. The primary lot size is 60 feet by 100 feet, but the neighborhood includes some odd-shaped parcels and oversized corner lots.

== History ==
Its origins date back 1956 when developer G. Frank Croissant bought the property and hired E. Elliot Gross and Associates of West Palm Beach, Florida to plan the neighborhood. G. Frank Croissant also developed Calumet City, Illinois and Croissant Park in Ft. Lauderdale, Florida. Mr. Croissant died in late 1956.

In 1958, the North Palm Beach Heights Water Control District was created by the Florida State Legislature. This 298 district was allowed to float bonds to build infrastructure. The water district filed plans for North Palm Beach Heights Section 1, 2a, and 2b with Palm Beach County and paved the streets in those sections in the late 1950s.

Development was hampered for years due to a lack of city water and sewer system. The first homes were built in the early 1980s. In 1984, the North Palm Beach Heights Water Control District floated new bonds for a city water hookup, a sewer system, re-pavement of the old roads in the southern sections and the paving of the unrecorded sections of North Palm Beach Heights Section 3 and AM-45. The Town of Jupiter Water Department was chosen for the city water supply and the Loxahatchee River District handles the sewer system.

In 1987, Interstate 95 was routed through the western 500 feet or so of the neighborhood. Most of the homes were built after the water and sewer systems were installed in 1987.

North Palm Beach Heights was incorporated into the Town of Jupiter by Ordinance No. 4-98, which was adopted on January 20, 1998. Pursuant to the ordinance, a referendum was to be held on March 10, 1998 when a majority of the electors within the Town of Jupiter and a majority of the voters within the proposed annexation area were to vote for or against annexation. The referendum passed and North Palm Beach Heights officially became part of the Town of Jupiter on December 1, 1998. In 2000, the town, along with neighborhood residents, created a neighborhood group named The Friends of North Palm Beach Heights, later changed to The Friends of the Heights of Jupiter. They obtained grants to beautify the entrance of the development with landscaping and were involved in the design of the neighborhood park in North Palm Beach Heights.
