= Roger Dean Stadium =

Baseball stadium in Jupiter, Florida

Roger Dean Chevrolet Stadium

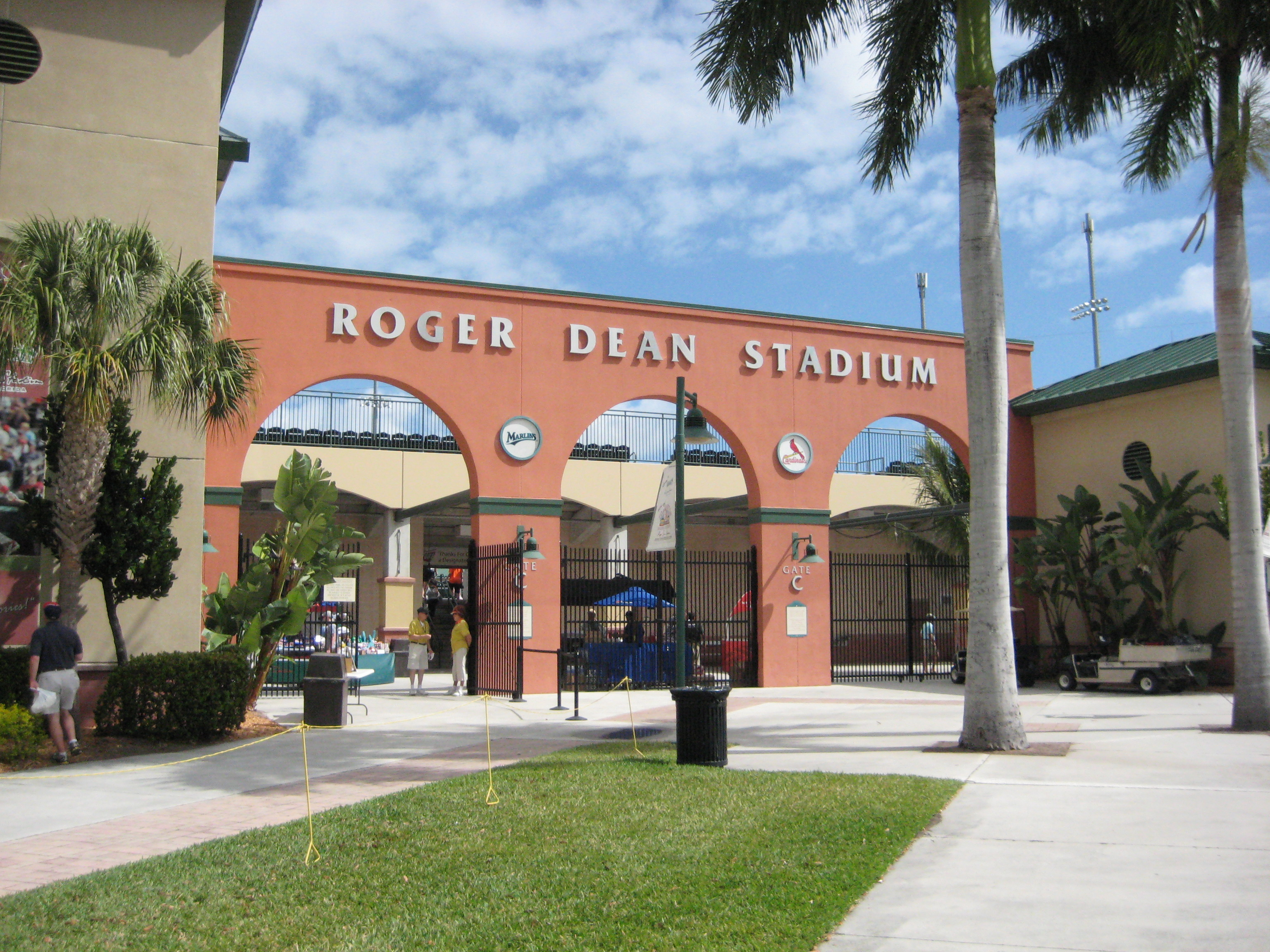
- Roger Dean Stadium pictured in 2009
- Interactive map of Roger Dean Chevrolet Stadium
- Full name: Roger Dean Chevrolet Stadium
- Location: 4751 Main Street; Jupiter, Florida 33458 (561) 775-1818
- Coordinates: 26°53′28″N 80°06′59″W
- Owner: Palm Beach County
- Operator: Jupiter Stadium Limited
- Capacity: 6,871
- Surface: Grass
- Field size: Left Field: 335 ft Left-Center: 380 ft Center Field: 400 ft Right-Center: 375 ft Right Field: 325 ft

Construction
- Groundbreaking: March 6, 1997
- Opened: February 28, 1998
- Cost: US$28 million ($55.3 million in 2025 dollars)
- Architect: Populous
- Structural engineers: Bliss & Nyitray, Inc.
- Services engineers: Bredson & Associates, Inc.
- General contractor: Case Contracting Company

Tenants
- FCL Cardinals (FCL) (1998–present); Jupiter Hammerheads (FSL) (1998-present); Montreal Expos (MLB) (spring training) (1998–2002); St. Louis Cardinals (MLB) (spring training) (2003–present); Palm Beach Cardinals (FSL) (1998-present); FCL Marlins (FCL) (2003–present); Florida / Miami Marlins (MLB) (spring training) (2003–present)

Roger Dean Stadium (officially known as Roger Dean Chevrolet Stadium) is a baseball stadium located in the Abacoa community of the town of Jupiter, Florida. The stadium was built in 1998, holds 6,871 people, and features luxury sky-box seating, two levels of permanent seating, parking and concessions. The Roger Dean Stadium Complex is the only stadium in the country to host four minor league teams: the Jupiter Hammerheads and Palm Beach Cardinals of the Florida State League, and the Florida Complex League Marlins and Florida Complex League Cardinals of the Rookie-level Florida Complex League.

Roger Dean Stadium is one of only two stadiums in Florida to host two Major League Baseball teams annually for spring training: the Miami Marlins and St. Louis Cardinals (the other is The Ballpark of the Palm Beaches, which opened in 2017, hosting the Washington Nationals and Houston Astros). In both venues, the teams share the main stadium where the games are played. However, the teams have their own practice fields, outdoor batting cages, several pitching mounds, and state-of-the-art conditioning rooms.

== History ==
Through 2002, the Montreal Expos shared the stadium with the Cardinals, until they swapped with the Marlins as part of the Marlins' sale to Jeffrey Loria. The Expos, now known as the Washington Nationals, then moved to Space Coast Stadium in Viera.

The Roger Dean Stadium was badly damaged in 2004 by Hurricane Frances and Jeanne.

Cliff Politte threw the first pitch in the stadium's history in spring training, 1998.

In September 2012, the stadium hosted a qualifying round for the 2013 World Baseball Classic. Spain, France, Israel, and South Africa took part in the qualifier.

Roger Dean Stadium hosted the Florida State League All-Star Game in 2019.

In February 2022, Roger Dean Stadium was the site of negotiations between Major League Baseball and the players' union as part of the 2021–22 Major League Baseball lockout.

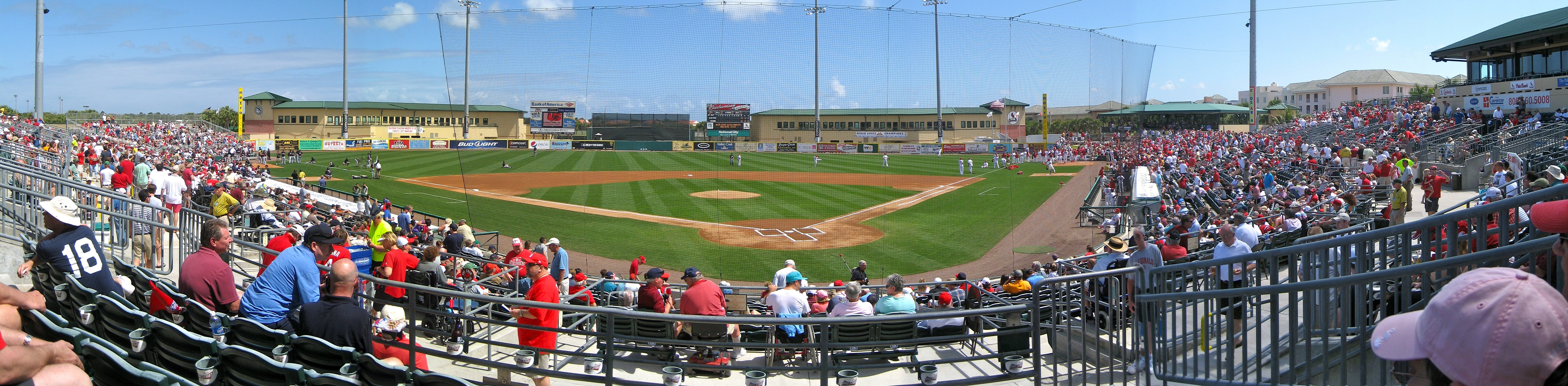
Roger Dean Stadium
