= Sarah Kauss =

American businesswoman (born 1975)

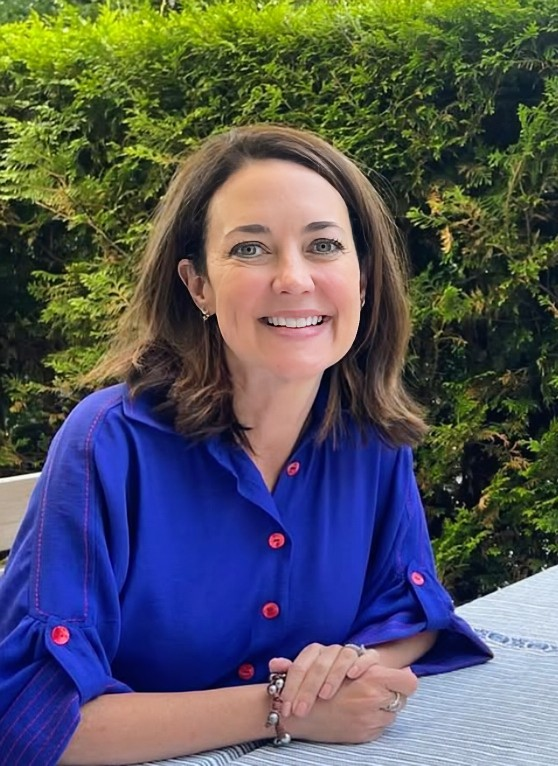
- Kauss in 2024
- Born: 1975 (age 50–51); Jupiter, Florida
- Education: University of Colorado Boulder, Harvard Business School
- Occupation: Founder of S'well
- Website: https://www.sarahkauss.com/

Sarah Kauss (born 1975) is an American businesswoman. She is known as the founder of S'well, a reusable, insulated products manufacturer, wholesaler and retailer.

== Early life and education ==
Kauss was raised in Jupiter, Florida by parents who were small business owners. She received a bachelor's in accounting from the University of Colorado Boulder and her MBA from Harvard Business School.

== Career ==
After receiving her bachelor's degree, Kauss worked as a CPA for Ernst & Young in Denver, Colorado and Los Angeles, California. She then moved into commercial real estate. In 2009, Kauss was inspired to create a more upscale and fashionable reusable water bottle, while hiking in Arizona with her mother. Kauss founded S'well in 2010. The company helped displace more than 4 billion single-use plastic bottles and was named one of 25 designs that helped shape the world by Architectural Digest before Kauss sold the company in 2022 to Lifetime Brands.

Fortune included Kauss on its 2014 40 under 40 list. She was selected as a member of the 2014 class of EY Entrepreneurial Winning Women. In 2016, Kauss was named number 49 on the Business Insider 100 list, The Creators. She was recognized on Inc.'s "Most Impressive Women Entrepreneurs of 2016" list. In 2018, Kauss was named one of Aspen Institute's Henry Crown Fellows and was selected as an Aspen Institute 2020 Braddock Scholar. Kauss is an active board member of Thorne Healthtech, which Procter & Gamble has agreed to acquire for $3.8 billion.

Kauss has been featured in NPR, Inc. Magazine, Entrepreneur magazine, Fortune magazine, CNNMoney, and CNBC, among other outlets. She was a mentor for the U.S. Department of State Global Women's Mentoring Partnership.
