= S'well =

Bottle and insulated products company

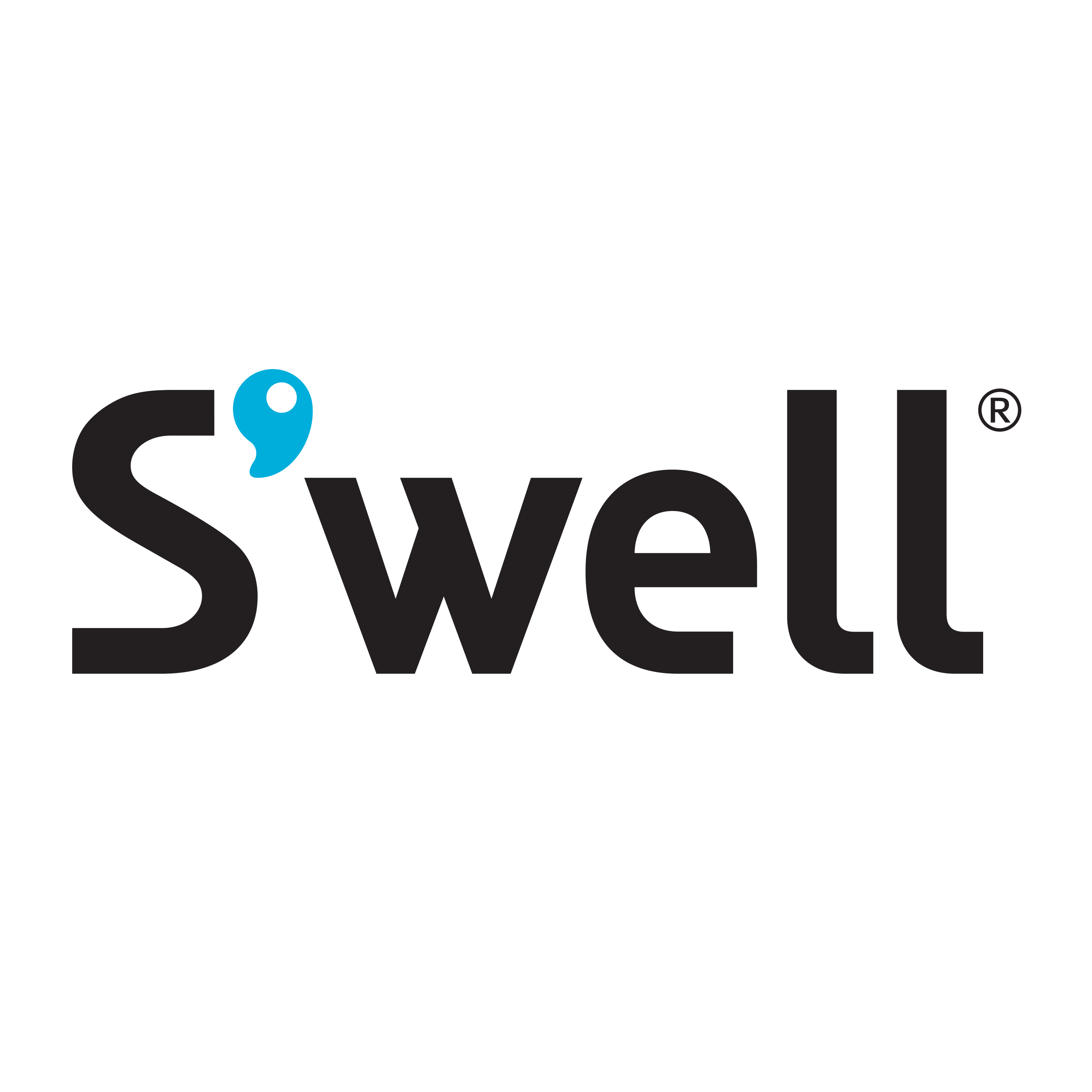
- Type: Private
- Founded: 2010
- Founder: Sarah Kauss
- Headquarters: Manhattan, New York City, New York, United States
- Key people: Hugh Rovit (CEO)
- Products: Water bottles, reusable food containers, stainless steel straws
- Website: www.swell.com

S'well is a reusable water bottle and insulated products company headquartered in Manhattan, New York. Sarah Kauss founded the company in 2010 and was the company's CEO until 2020.

== History ==
S'well was founded by Sarah Kauss in 2010. She started the company after attending a panel, at her five-year Harvard Business School reunion, focused on the global clean water crisis. She initially invested $30,000 of her own savings and operated out of a brownstone in Manhattan. A year after the company launched, S'well experienced The Oprah Effect after being featured in O, The Oprah Magazine. From 2013 to 2014, the company's revenue had grown 400 percent, generating $10 million in sales by the end of the year. S'well's operations relocated to the Flatiron District of Manhattan in 2015. By May 2015, S'well had sold 4 million bottles. In 2016, Forbes reported that the company was listed first in a ranking of the fifty fastest growing women-owned or led companies after revenues increased from $10 million in 2013 to $47 million in 2015. The growth rate resulted in a listing on Crain's 2016 and 2017 Fast50. In 2016, Forbes reported that S'well had over $100M in sales.

In 2017, the company increased staff at its London headquarters and expanded its retail sales to 65 countries worldwide. That same year, the company relocated its Manhattan headquarters to a larger office space.

In September 2018, the company partnered with the NYC Mayor's Office of Sustainability and the New York City Department of Education which gave out S’well water bottles to 600 high schools. In February 2020 Hugh Rovit became CEO.

== Product ==
The company sells bottles that hold 9 US fluid ounces (270 millilitres), 17 US fl oz (500 ml) or 25 US fl oz (740 ml). The bottles are reusable and include triple-layer insulation. The manufacturer claims the bottles are non-leaking, non-toxic and they keep liquids cold for 24 hours and hot for 12 hours. However, objective testing suggests that the actual durations may be shorter.

A 2015 consumer report tested the efficacy of the S'well bottle. Initially filling the bottle with water at 40 degrees Fahrenheit (4 degrees Celsius), the testers compared changes in temperature using a regular plastic bottle as the control. After five hours, the plastic bottle's water temperature read 79 °F (26 °C) while the S'well's water read 41 °F (5 °C). After twenty-four hours, the plastic bottle's water was at 84 °F (29 °C), the S'well's water at 69 °F (21 °C). Testing the product's heat retention claim, the testers filled the bottle with hot coffee. The initial temperature was above 168 degrees Fahrenheit (76 degrees Celsius). Six hours later, the thermometer read more than 140 °F (60 °C). Twelve hours later the temperature was 126 °F (52 °C), dropping 42 °F (24 °C).

In March 2016, S'Well released S'ip by S'well, a line of 15oz bottles sold through retail chain Target.

As of November 2017, the company produced bottles in over 200 different designs. S'well added new bottles named the Traveler and the Tumbler in 2017. In 2018, the company added the Roamer, a large bottle, to its line.

In 2019, S’well launched new lines of portable triple-layer food and snacking containers.
