= Harriet L. Wilkes Honors College =

College of Florida Atlantic University

Coordinates: 26°53′17.5″N 80°7′3.5″W

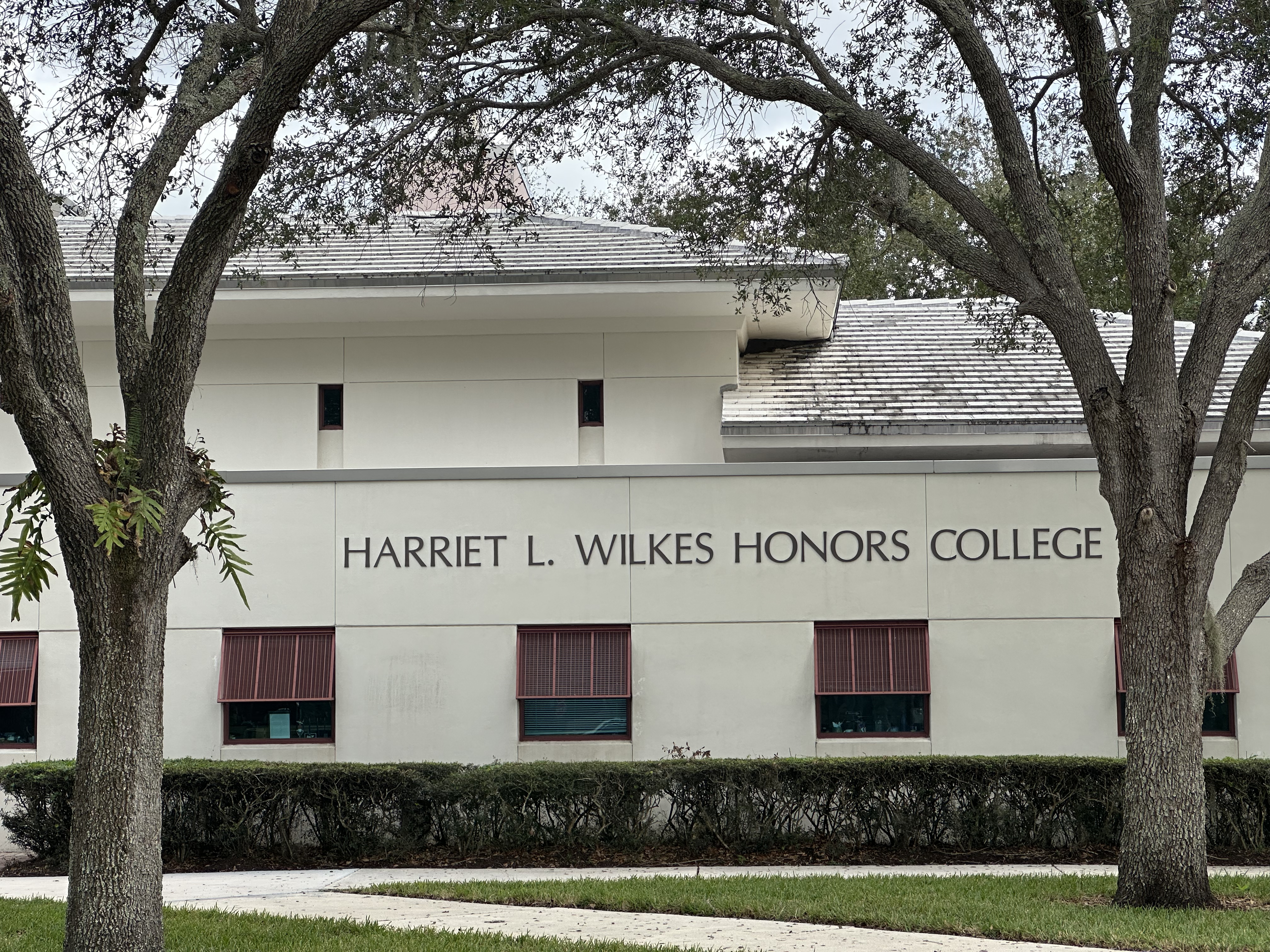
- Established: 1999
- Dean: Justin Perry
- Faculty: 70
- Undergraduates: 500
- Location: 5353 Parkside Drive, Jupiter, Florida
- Website: www.honorscollege.edu

The Harriet L. Wilkes Honors College is located in Jupiter, Florida and is the academic honors college of Florida Atlantic University. The residential college opened in 1999 and offers undergraduate degrees in the liberal arts and sciences under a modified curriculum.

== Background ==
The Honors College shares Florida Atlantic University's John D. MacArthur campus in Jupiter, Florida with the Scripps Research Institute and Max Planck Florida Institute for Neuroscience. All Honors College students are required to live on campus for their first two years. As of 2023, Justin Perry (Ph.D., Boston College) serves as Dean of the college, only the fourth in the college's history.

Since the college is housed on its own separate campus, it is almost exclusively made up by faculty and staff that only serve the Honors College. Although students typically have no need to take classes in FAU's other ten academic colleges, they have access to complete additional coursework at the university's flagship campus in Boca Raton. The Jupiter campus library serving the Honors College remains a part of the central FAU Library system housed in Boca Raton.

== Academics ==
=== Overview ===
The Wilkes Honors College distinguishes itself from Florida Atlantic University's standards for traditional students and upper-division honors program by adding thesis, internship, research, and class type requirements for its honors college students. The college usually maintains an approximate 1:15 faculty-student ratio. It offers its honors students 32 major concentrations and 20 minor concentrations in the liberal arts and sciences. Honors students may also pursue a minor in business in collaboration with the FAU College of Business. The Honors College classifies its degrees differently from traditional FAU students. They offer a Bachelor of Arts and Bachelor of Science degrees in Liberal Arts and Sciences and Bachelor of Arts and Bachelor of Science degrees in Biological and Physical Sciences.

=== Pathways and Placement ===
The Wilkes Honors College holds several research and academic partnerships with the Scripps Research Institute and Max Planck Florida Institute for Neuroscience. The Honors College also hosts the Wilkes Medical Scholars Program in partnership with the Charles E. Schmidt College of Medicine as a pipeline program for honors students interested in earning their M.D. degrees. Approximately 20% of students pursue graduate school at Florida Atlantic University while 45% attend elsewhere. The Honors Colleges publicly reports student acceptances at several top institutions including Caltech, Georgetown, and the University of Chicago.

=== Symposium/Research Day ===
A tradition unique to the Honors College is the Honors College Symposium for Scholarly and Creative Research, also referred to as "Symposium Day" or "Research Day." It is an annual conference-type event that features public talks, poster sessions, research and visual arts presentations. Symposium Day usually includes a keynote speaker from a leader outside the university. Past speakers include Florida District Appeals Judge Carole Y. Taylor and Canadian science philosopher Dr. Michael Ruse.

== Accreditation ==
Despite it being housed on a separate campus and the only FAU College authorized to use stand-alone iconography where the university name is not the main logo, it maintains its accreditation under the auspices of Florida Atlantic University. Through the university, the Honors College is fully accredited by the Southern Association of Colleges and Schools Commission on Colleges.
