= Jupiter, Florida =

Town in the United States

- Town
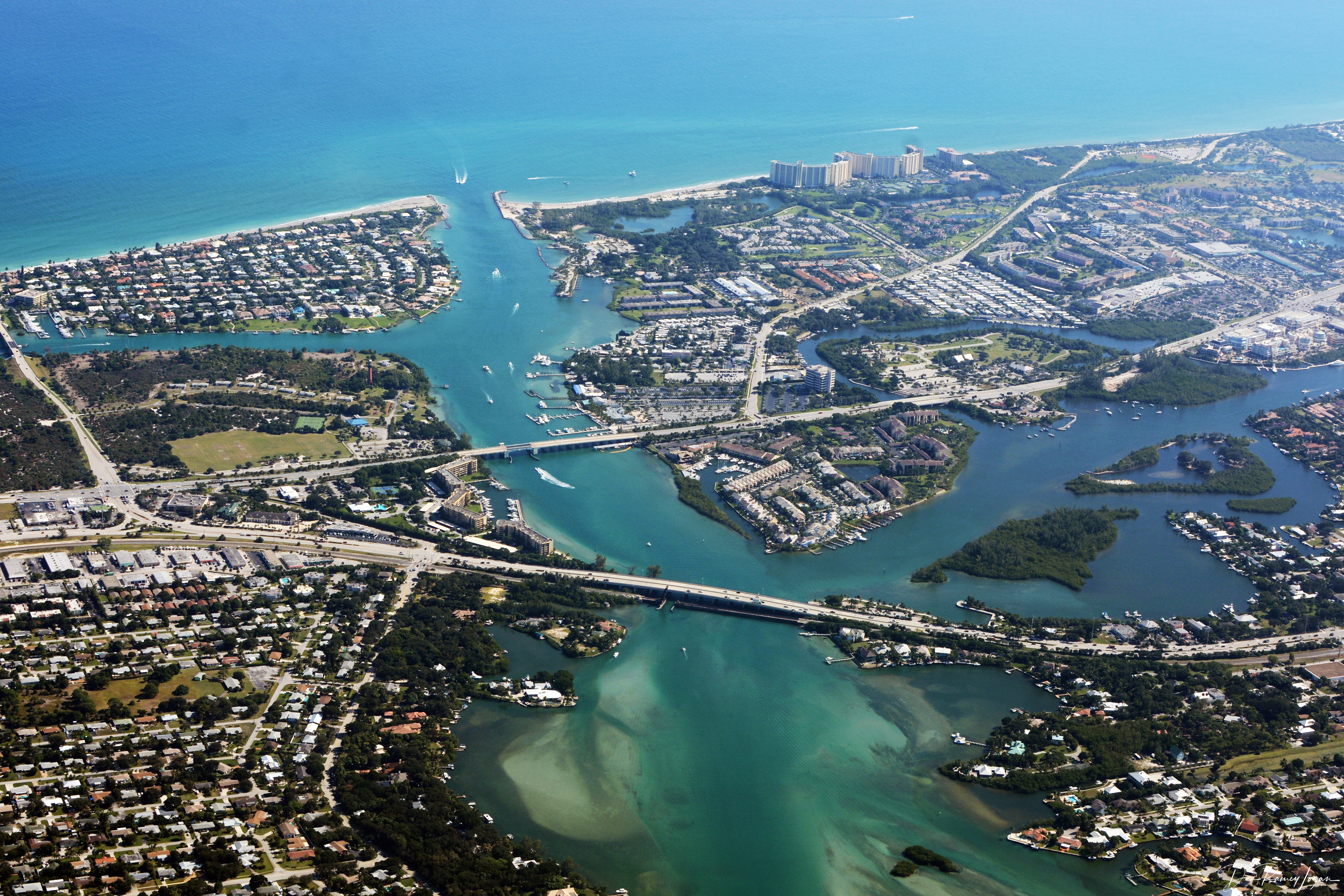
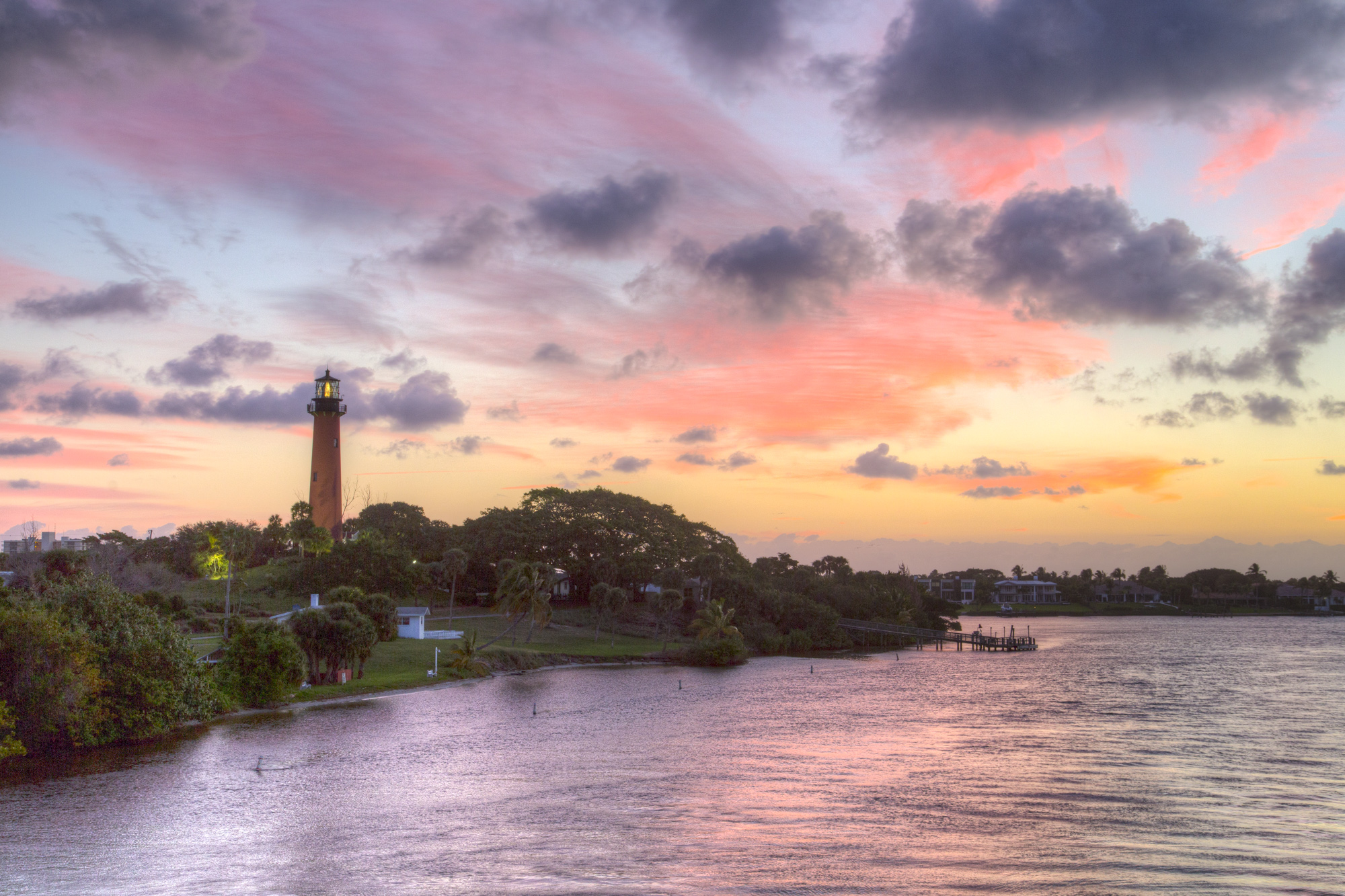
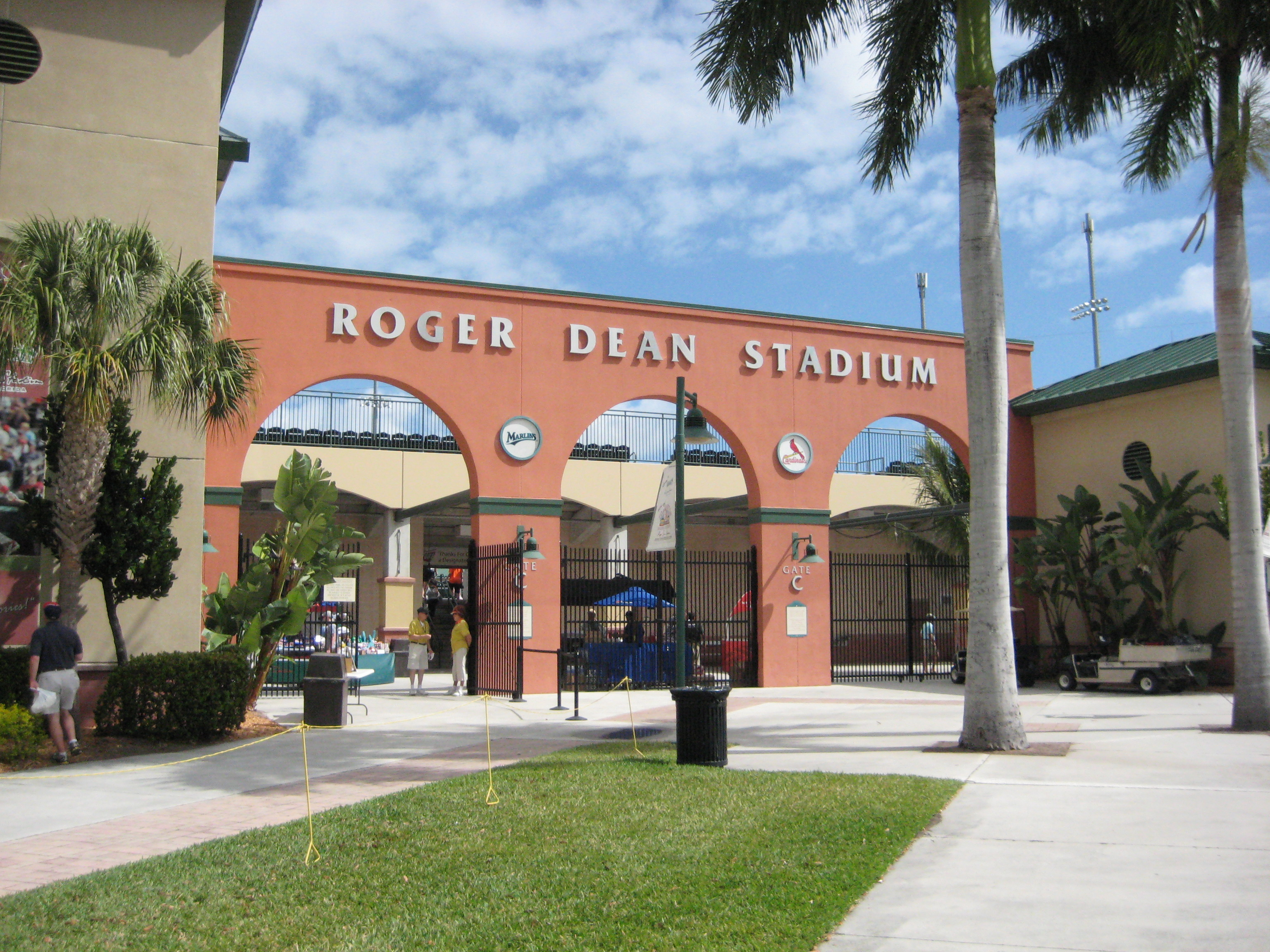
- Aerial view of Jupiter Inlet Jupiter Inlet Light Roger Dean Stadium

- Flag Seal
- Interactive map of Jupiter, Florida
- Location within Florida Location within the United States
- Coordinates: 26°55′30″N 80°07′38″W
- Country: United States
- State: Florida
- County: Palm Beach
- Incorporated: February 9, 1925; 101 years ago

Government
  - Type: Council-Manager

Area
  - Total: 23.12 sq mi (59.89 km^{2})
  - Land: 21.63 sq mi (56.02 km^{2})
  - Water: 1.49 sq mi (3.87 km^{2})
- Elevation: 10 ft (3.0 m)

Population (2020)
  - Total: 61,047
  - Density: 2,823/sq mi (1,089.8/km^{2})
- Time zone: UTC-5 (EST)
  - Summer (DST): UTC-4 (EDT)
- ZIP codes: 33410, 33418, 33458, 33468, 33469, 33477, 33478
- Area codes: 561, 728
- FIPS code: 12-35875
- GNIS feature ID: 2405927
- Website: jupiter.fl.us

Jupiter is the northernmost town in Palm Beach County, Florida, United States. Located along the Atlantic coast of South Florida at the mouth of the Loxahatchee River, the town is bordered by the Atlantic Ocean to the east, Martin County and the village of Tequesta to the north, unincorporated Palm Beach County to the west, and Juno Beach to the south. The town is connected to the Intracoastal Waterway through the Indian River Lagoon, which reaches its southern terminus at the Jupiter Inlet. Approximately 84 miles (135 km) north of Miami and 15 miles (24 km) north of West Palm Beach, Jupiter, together with the adjacent village of Tequesta, forms the northernmost municipality in the Miami metropolitan area.

The Jupiter area has been inhabited for thousands of years, first by Indigenous peoples, such as the Jaega, whose village was located near the inlet. Spanish explorers recorded the area during the 16th century, and the name "Jupiter" originated from a mistranslation of the Spanish name Jobe, derived from the Indigenous name Hobe, which was further misunderstood by mapmakers to refer to the Roman god. Permanent American settlement began in the 19th with the construction of the Jupiter Inlet Light in 1860, which became an important maritime landmark along Florida's east coast. The arrival of Henry Flagler's Florida East Coast Railway in the 1890s and later highway development encouraged growth throughout the 20th.

According to the 2020 US Census, the town had a population of 61,047. It was named the 9th Best Southern Beach Town to live in by Stacker Newsletter for 2022 and as the 9th Happiest Seaside Town in the United States by Coastal Living in 2012.

== History ==
The area where the town now sits was originally named for the Hobe Indian tribe which lived at the mouth of the Loxahatchee River and whose name is also preserved in the name of nearby Hobe Sound. A mapmaker misunderstood the Spanish spelling Jobe of the native people name Hobe and recorded it as Jove. Subsequent mapmakers further misunderstood this to be the name of the Roman god Jupiter, because the declension of the word Jupiter in Latin includes the root Jov- in all cases but the nominative case and vocative case. They, therefore, adopted the more familiar name of Jupiter. The god Jupiter (or Zeus in the Greek mythology) is the chief Roman god, and the god of light, of the sky and weather, and of the state and its welfare and laws. Jupiter's consort was Juno, inspiring a neighboring town to name itself Juno Beach.

The Battles of the Loxahatchee took place in Jupiter, in what is now Riverbend Park and Loxahatchee River Battlefield Park. Two Second Seminole War battles occurred here: Powell's Battle on January 15, 1838, and Jesup's Battle on January 24, 1838. The most notable landmark is the Jupiter Inlet Lighthouse, completed in 1860. Made of brick, it was painted red in 1910 to cover discoloration caused by humidity. Hurricane Jeanne in 2004 sandblasted the paint from the upper portion of the tower, and the tower was repainted using a potassium silicate mineral coating. The lighthouse often is used as the symbol for Jupiter.

=== United States flag incident ===
In 1999, Jupiter resident George Andres wanted to display a United States flag in his front yard; however, the homeowners association had a bylaw that prohibited the display of a flagpole in the front lawn. Andres still displayed the flag, while the homeowners association continued litigation until George Andres foreclosed his home to cover legal fees after being in court at least twenty-eight times. Even after governor Jeb Bush visited his home along with members of the local and national media, the homeowners association, as well as George, refused to budge.

George Andres later won the case and was allowed to display his flag in his front lawn with the use of a flagpole.

On July 24, 2006, President George W. Bush signed into law the Freedom to Display the American Flag Act of 2005, allowing residents to display the flag on their residential property despite any homeowners association rules.

== Geography and climate ==
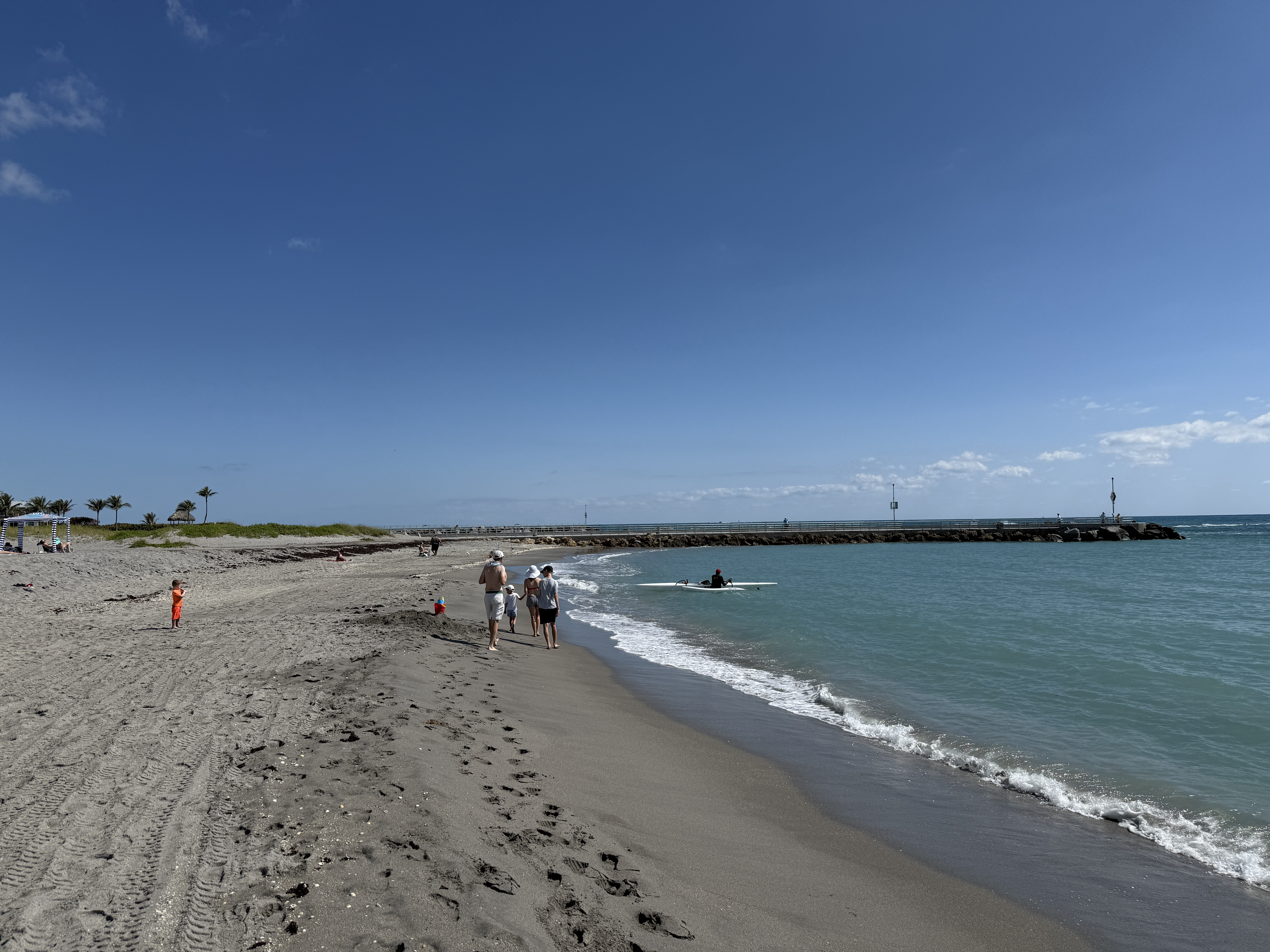
Beach at Jupiter Beach Park

According to the United States Census Bureau, the town has a total area of 21.1 square miles (55 km^{2}), of which 20.0 square miles (52 km^{2}) is land and 1.1 square miles (2.8 km^{2}) is water. Jupiter has a unique geographical location that sticks out into the Atlantic Ocean further than any other point on the Florida coast. Since 1550, ships have considered it an important stop when sailing to Central and South America.

Jupiter has a trade-wind tropical rainforest climate (Köppen Af). Much of the year is warm to hot in Jupiter, and frost is extremely rare. Jupiter is also known for humid summers. As is typical in South Florida, there are two basic seasons in Jupiter, a mild and dry winter (November through April), and a hot and wet summer (May through October). Daily thundershowers are common in the hot season, though they are brief. The Town of Jupiter is home to a multitude of tropical trees, and is also known for its lush landscaping around private homes and public parks.

== Demographics ==
Historical population
Census	Pop.	Note	%±
1930	176		—
1940	215		22.2%
1950	313		45.6%
1960	1,058		238.0%
1970	3,136		196.4%
1980	9,868		214.7%
1990	24,986		153.2%
2000	39,328		57.4%
2010	55,156		40.2%
2020	61,047		10.7%
U.S. Decennial Census

=== Racial and ethnic composition ===
Jupiter, Florida – Racial and ethnic composition Note: the US Census treats Hispanic/Latino as an ethnic category. This table excludes Latinos from the racial categories and assigns them to a separate category. Hispanics/Latinos may be of any race.
Race / Ethnicity (NH = Non-Hispanic)	Pop 1980	Pop 1990	Pop 2000	Pop 2010	Pop 2020	% 1980	% 1990	% 2000	% 2010	% 2020
White alone (NH)	9,622	23,789	35,152	45,569	46,366	97.51%	95.21%	89.38%	82.62%	75.95%
Black or African American alone (NH)	43	222	461	774	858	0.44%	0.89%	1.17%	1.40%	1.41%
Native American or Alaska Native alone (NH)	56	27	54	77	44	0.57%	0.11%	0.14%	0.14%	0.07%
Asian alone (NH)	42	213	438	1,076	1,904	0.43	0.85%	1.11%	1.95%	3.12%
Native Hawaiian or Pacific Islander alone (NH)	x	x	20	25	26	x	x	0.05%	0.05%	0.04%
Other race alone (NH)	28	3	39	72	205	0.28%	0.01%	0.10%	0.13%	0.34%
Mixed race or Multiracial alone (NH)	x	x	283	569	1,900	x	x	0.72%	1.03%	3.11%
Hispanic or Latino (any race)	133	732	2,881	6,994	9,744	1.35%	2.93%	7.33%	12.68%	15.96%
Total	9,868	24,986	39,328	55,156	61,047	100.00%	100.00%	100.00%	100.00%	100.00%

=== 2020 census ===
As of the 2020 census, Jupiter had a population of 61,047. The median age was 46.7 years. 19.3% of residents were under the age of 18 and 23.7% of residents were 65 years of age or older. For every 100 females there were 95.0 males, and for every 100 females age 18 and over there were 92.5 males age 18 and over.

100.0% of residents lived in urban areas, while 0.0% lived in rural areas.

There were 25,816 households in Jupiter, of which 26.1% had children under the age of 18 living in them. Of all households, 50.5% were married-couple households, 17.0% were households with a male householder and no spouse or partner present, and 26.5% were households with a female householder and no spouse or partner present. About 28.7% of all households were made up of individuals and 13.8% had someone living alone who was 65 years of age or older.

There were 30,679 housing units, of which 15.9% were vacant. The homeowner vacancy rate was 1.2% and the rental vacancy rate was 7.9%.

=== Demographic estimates ===
According to the Census Bureau's 2020 ACS 5-year estimates, there were 16,484 families residing in the town. Females made up 51.7% of the population in 2020, and the average household size was 2.43.

=== Income and poverty ===
In 2020, the median income for a household in the town was $87,163, and the per capita income for the town was $57,865. Out of the total population, 7.9% were living below the poverty line.

=== 2010 census ===
As of the 2010 United States census, there were 55,156 people, 21,614 households, and 13,452 families residing in the town.

=== 2000 census ===
As of the 2000 US census, there are 39,328 people, 16,945 households, and 11,403 families residing in the town. The population density is 759.2/km^{2} (1,966.5/mi^{2}). There are 20,943 housing units at an average density of 404.3/km^{2} (1,047.2/mi^{2}). The racial makeup of the town is 94.86% White (89.4% were Non-Hispanic White), 1.22% African American, 0.19% Native American, 1.12% Asian, 0.12% Pacific Islander, 1.37% from other races, and 1.12% from two or more races. 7.33% of the population are Hispanic or Latino of any race.

In 2000, there were 16,945 households out of which 26.6% had children under the age of 18 living with them, 55.8% were married couples living together, 8.4% had a female householder with no husband present, and 32.7% were non-families. 25.8% of all households are made up of individuals, and 10.4% have someone living alone who is 65 years of age or older. The average household size is 2.32, and the average family size is 3.15

In 2000, the town's age distribution showed that 20.7% were under the age of 18, 5.1% from 18 to 24, 28.8% from 25 to 44, 26.5% from 45 to 64, and 18.9% were 65 years of age or older. The median age is 42 years. For every 100 females, there are 97.2 males. For every 100 females age 18 and over, there are 94.2 males.

In 2000, the median income for a household in the town is $54,945, and the median income for a family is $64,873. Males have a median income of $44,883 versus $33,514 for females. The per capita income for the town is $35,088. 4.8% of the population and 3.0% of families are below the poverty line. Out of the total population, 4.7% of those under the age of 18 and 4.7% of those 65 and older are living below the poverty line.

As of 2000, speakers of English as a first language accounted for 88.47% of all residents, while Spanish was at 7.17%, and Italian made up 1.66% of the population.

As of 2000, it's also home to the 102nd highest percentage of Guatemalan residents, which made up 1.09% of the population (tied with Calverton, New York).

=== Growth of Hispanic population ===
According to the U.S. Census Bureau, the Hispanic or Latino population in Jupiter has grown steadily since 2000. In the 2000 United States census, 7.3% of the town’s residents identified as Hispanic or Latino, increasing to 12.69% in 2010 and 15.96% in 2020. More recent figures from the 2019–2023 American Community Survey 5-Year Estimates indicate that Hispanics or Latinos now make up approximately 17.3% of the town’s population, or about 10,500 people.

Hispanic or Latino population in Jupiter, Florida

Year	Percentage of population	Source
2000	7.33%	U.S. Census
2010	12.68%	U.S. Census
2020	15.96%	U.S. Census
2023	17.3%	U.S. Census Bureau, ACS 2019–2023

== Education and research ==
=== Public and private grade level schools ===
The School District of Palm Beach County provides public education for Kindergarten through twelfth grades. Jupiter's population is served primarily by two public high schools: Jupiter Community High School in Jupiter, and William T. Dwyer High School in Palm Beach Gardens. Jupiter is also home to several private schools and religious schools that serve the same grade levels. Jupiter Christian School is one of the privately operated schools in the town.

Universities and colleges

Harriet L. Wilkes Honors College at Florida Atlantic University

Florida Atlantic University, John D. MacArthur Campus

Research

Jupiter is home to the Max Planck Florida Institute for Neuroscience, which conducts fundamental research in neuroscience, and is the Max Planck Society's first non-European research institute.

== Public safety ==
=== Fire Department ===
Jupiter was originally served by a volunteer fire department and later a paid fire district. On October 1, 1984, Palm Beach County Fire Rescue was created and assumed responsibility for providing fire protection and emergency medical services to the town. In 2023, the town council elected to create an independent fire/rescue department, and after three years of preparation, the new Jupiter Fire Rescue Department began operations on October 1. 2026. The department consists of 94 personnel, operates three stations:

- Station 10 – Engine 10, Rescue 10 and Truck 10;
- Station 11 – Engine 11 and Rescue 11;
- Station 12 – Squad 12, Rescue 12, Brush 12 and Battalion 12.

=== Police Department ===
The Jupiter Police Department consists of 122 sworn officers and 35 civilian support staff personnel, and is headquartered in the town's municipal campus. Its operational divisions include Road Patrol, Criminal Investigations, Traffic, K-9, Marine, Beach Patrol, Crime Scene Investigation, SWAT and Hostage Negotiation.

== Economy ==
Companies based in Jupiter include G4S Secure Solutions, Town Sports International Holdings, Holtec International, and The Babylon Bee.

== Notable people ==
- Robert Allenby, Australian professional golfer on PGA Tour
- Rick Ankiel, professional Major League Baseball (MLB) baseball player
- Briny Baird, professional golfer on PGA Tour
- Daniel Berger, professional golfer on PGA Tour
- Matt Bosher, professional NFL football player
- Don Brewer, drummer, singer, original member of Grand Funk Railroad
- Mika Brzezinski, political commentator
- Tyler Cameron, Contestant on the Bachelorette
- Shelby Chesnes, Playboy Playmate of the Month, July 2012
- Philip J. Corso, U.S. Army lieutenant colonel and author of The Day After Roswell
- Céline Dion, Canadian singer
- Ernie Els, South African professional golfer on PGA Tour
- Colleen Farrington, Playboy Playmate, model and nightclub singer
- Rickie Fowler, professional golfer on PGA Tour
- Hermes Franca, Brazilian mixed martial artist and UFC fighter
- Drew Garrett, actor
- Kellie Gerardi, commercial astronaut and payload specialist who is one of the first 100 women in space
- Lucas Glover, professional golfer on the PGA Tour
- Brendan Grace, Irish comedian
- Wayne Gretzky, Canadian NHL hockey player
- Rob Grill, singer (The Grass Roots)
- Bryant Gumbel, television journalist and sportscaster
- Matt Holliday, professional MLB baseball player
- Hugh Howey, writer
- Alan Jackson, American country singer-songwriter
- Michael Jordan, Hall of Fame NBA basketball player
- Sarah Kauss, entrepreneur, S'well water bottles
- Kyle Kirkwood, racing driver in the Indycar Series
- Brooks Koepka, professional golfer on PGA tour
- Debi Laszewski, IFBB professional bodybuilder
- Nate Laszewski, basketball player in the Israeli Basketball Premier League
- Jamie Lovemark, professional golfer on PGA Tour
- Shane Lowry, Irish professional golfer on PGA tour
- Will MacKenzie, professional golfer on PGA Tour
- Steve Marino, professional golfer on PGA Tour
- Vincent Marotta, entrepreneur, co-developer of Mr. Coffee
- Rory McIlroy, Northern Irish professional golfer on PGA Tour
- Miles Mikolas, professional MLB baseball player
- Brent Musburger, sportscaster
- Jason Newsted, former bass player of Metallica
- Cody Parkey, professional NFLfootball player
- Charles Nelson Reilly, actor and teacher.
- Burt Reynolds, actor
- Kid Rock, musician
- Joe Scarborough, political commentator
- Mike Schmidt, Hall of Fame MLB player
- Justin Thomas, professional golfer on PGA Tour
- Dara Torres, five-time Olympic swimmer and gold medalist
- Tico Torres, drummer for the band Bon Jovi
- Charles Vanik, former Democratic congressman from Ohio
- Camilo Villegas, Colombian professional golfer on PGA Tour
- Richy Werenski, professional golfer on PGA Tour
- Brett Wetterich, professional golfer on PGA Tour
- Tiger Woods, professional golfer on the PGA Tour
- Zion Wright, professional skateboarder, U.S. Olympic Skateboard Team

== Points of interest ==
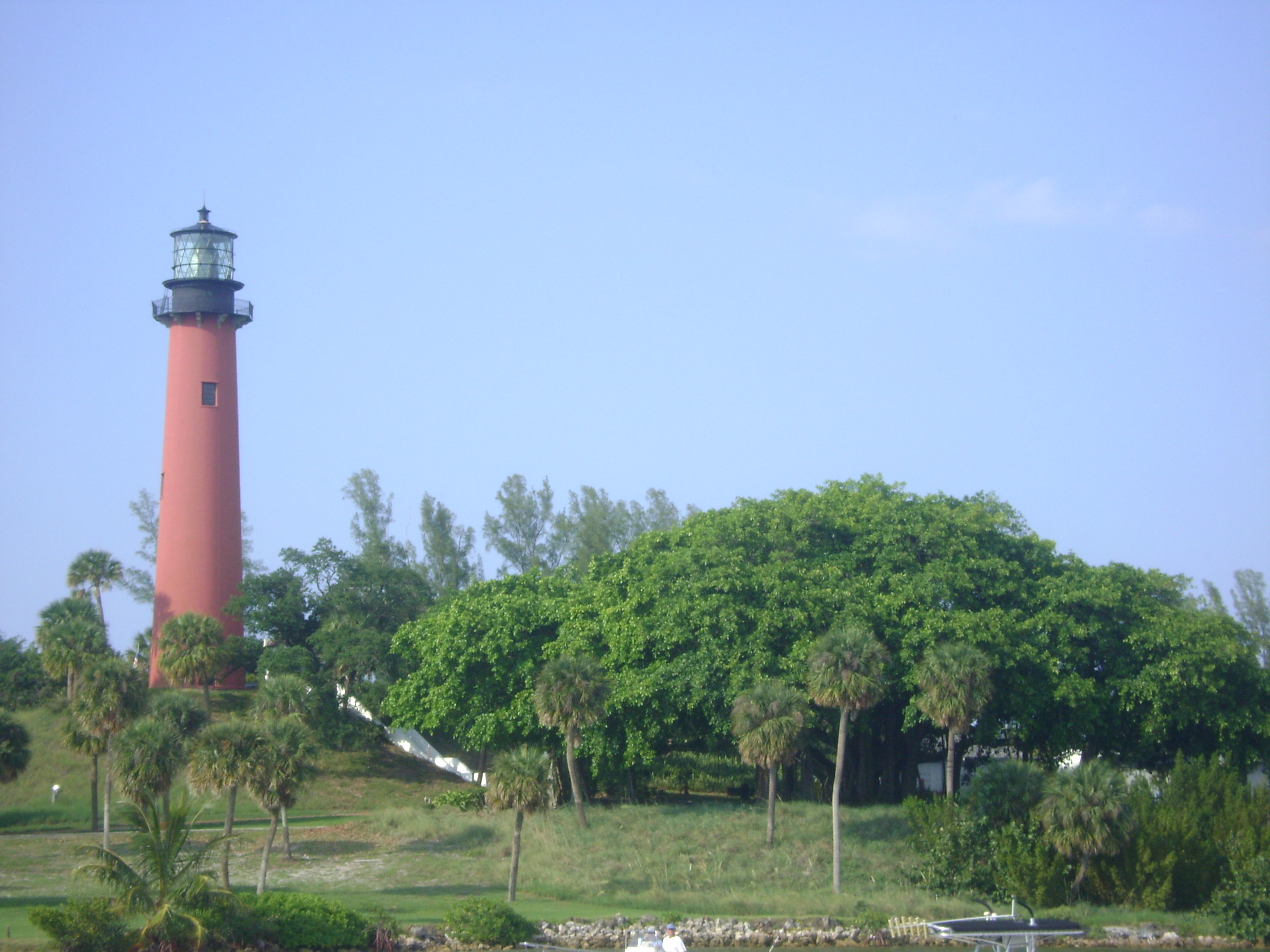
Jupiter Inlet Lighthouse

- Jupiter Inlet Lighthouse, listed on the National Register of Historic Places since 1973.
- Jupiter is the home to the Miami Marlins and St. Louis Cardinals spring training facilities as well as one of their respective Low-A Minor League Baseball affiliates, the Jupiter Hammerheads and Palm Beach Cardinals. They share the use of the Roger Dean Stadium complex, located in Abacoa. Both minor league squads compete in the Florida State League.
- William P. Gwinn Airport is located in Jupiter.
- Jupiter is home to Florida Atlantic University's MacArthur Campus. This northern campus of FAU is also the location of the Harriet L. Wilkes Honors College.
- Palm Beach International Raceway a racing facility built in 1965, and was remodeled in 2008 in an attempt to obtain a FIA Grade II Certification. The Facility currently hosts several IHRA and NHRA sportsman events as well as an ARCA Remax Series event.
- The Scripps Research Institute has opened a satellite campus adjacent to the MacArthur Campus of Florida Atlantic University in Jupiter. Approximately 360 scientists and technical staff operate in a 350,000-square-foot (33,000 m^{2}) state of the art research facility. Scripps Florida focuses on the development of therapeutic opportunities in several disease areas.
- The Max Planck Society has a facility on the FAU campus, the Max Planck Florida Institute for Neuroscience, and is the Max Planck Society's first non-European research institute.
- Jupiter beaches, many of which are dog-friendly, draw many residents and visitors from all over the world.
- The Harbourside Place is an outdoor, upscale shopping mall located just South of the Jupiter Inlet Lighthouse.
- Downtown Abacoa is a downtown area present adjacent to Harriet L. Wilkes Honors College in Southwest Jupiter. It houses an amphitheater, restaurants, coffee shops, a farmer's market, and the yearly Feast of Little Italy.
- The Jupiter Ridge Natural Area, a 271-acre area of protected land containing Florida scrub, depression marsh, tidal swamp, and flatwoods.

== Media ==
American Horror Story: Freak Show, the fourth season of American Horror Story, is set in Jupiter in 1952.

Smokey and the Bandit II has scenes set locally in Jupiter, FL. The 1980s film starring Burt Reynolds and Sally Field shows recognizable stretches of Indiantown Road and other Jupiter landmarks.

== Gallery ==
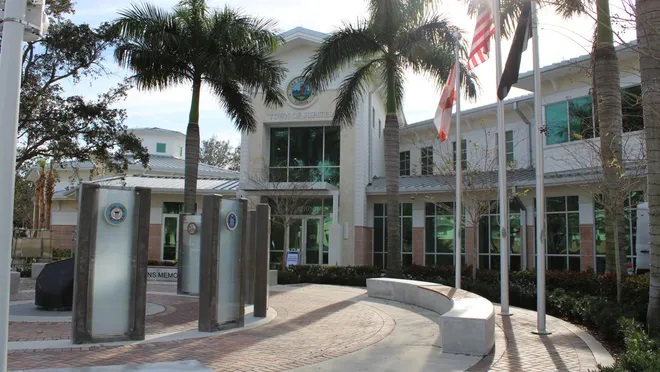
New Jupiter Town Hall

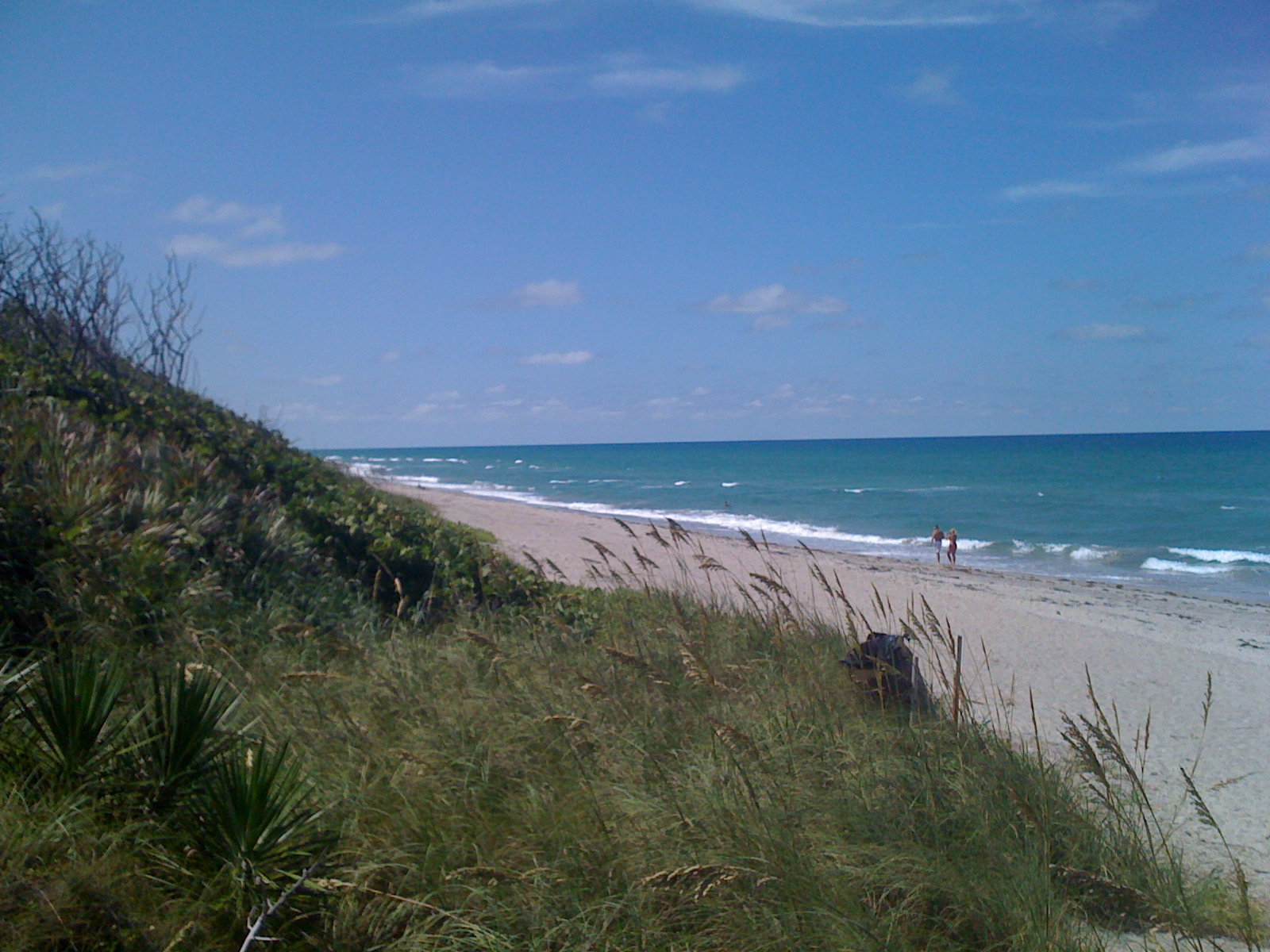
Jupiter, FL, United States – panoramio

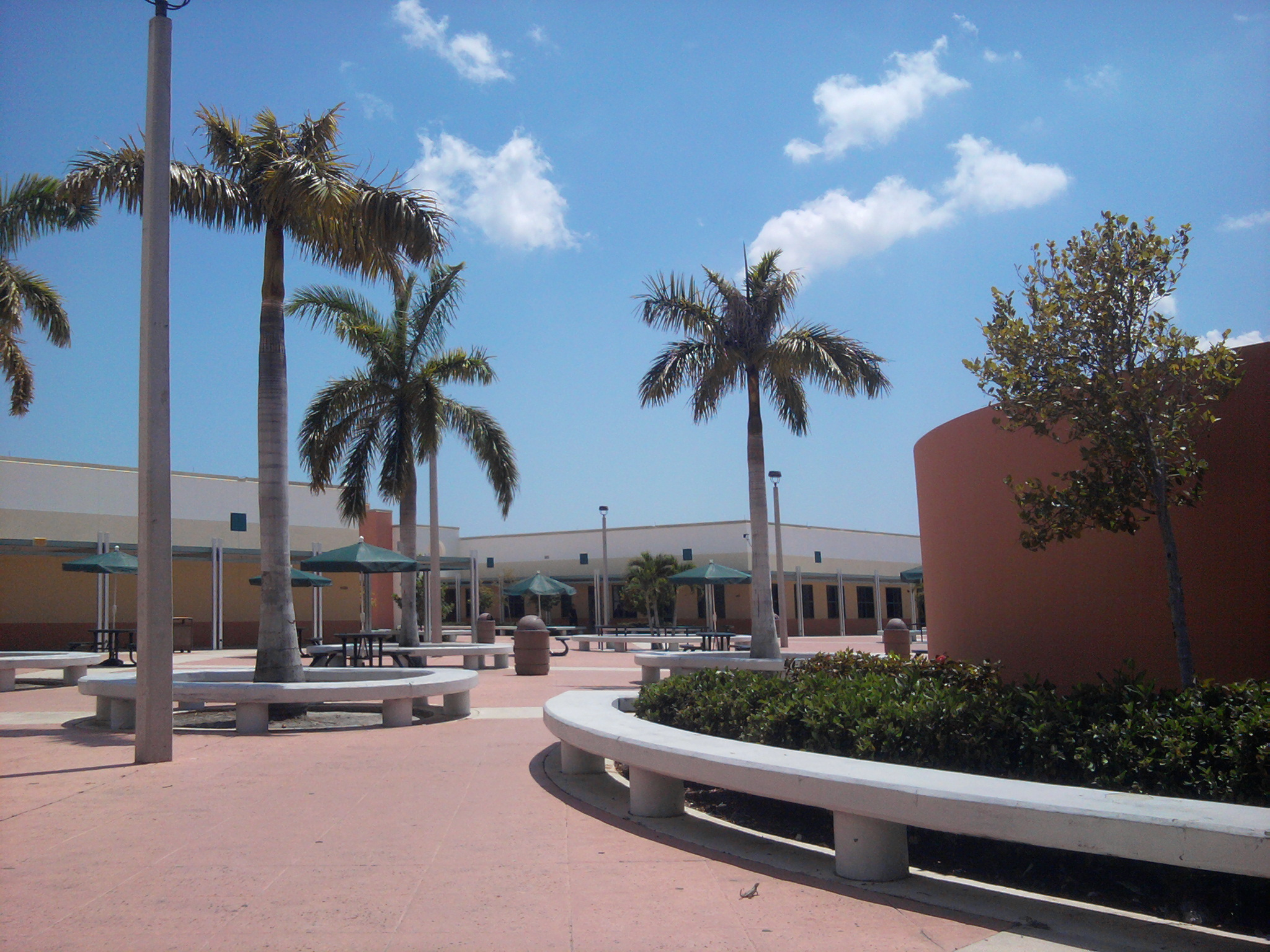
Jupiter Community High School

== See also ==
- North Palm Beach Heights
