= Max Planck Florida Institute for Neuroscience =

Neuroscience institute in Jupiter, FL

Coordinates: 26.8839°N 80.1148°W

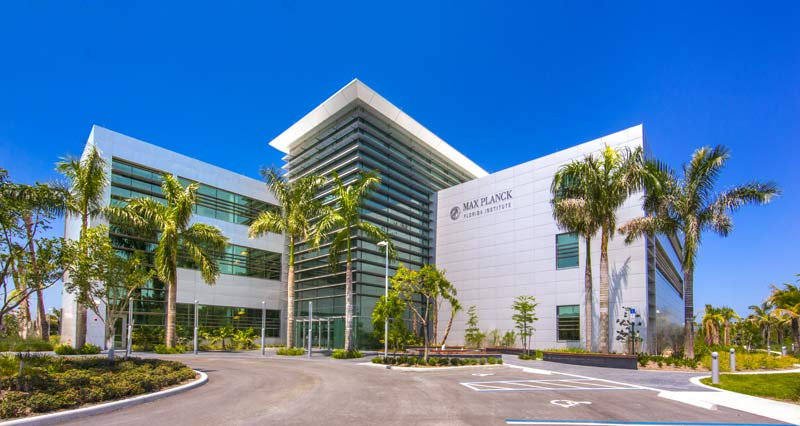
- The Institute in August 2012
- Established: 2010
- Chair: Dr. David Fitzpatrick
- Address: One Max Planck Way; Jupiter, Florida 33458 USA
- Location: John D. MacArthur Campus, Florida Atlantic University, Jupiter, Florida
- Website: www.mpfi.org

The Max Planck Florida Institute for Neuroscience (MPFI), is a research facility located in Jupiter, Florida. Its research focuses on brain function and neural circuits, using techniques to visualize microscopic molecular processes. It is the first institute established by the Max Planck Society in North America, and one of few institutes outside Germany.

== Research ==
The focus of the research at this institute is to better understand the structure, function, and development of neural circuits. It is a basic research institute. There are 9 research groups within MPFI, including labs run by the three scientific directors.

=== Scientific Directors ===
The first Scientific Director of the Max Planck Florida Institute for Neuroscience was David Fitzpatrick. David Fitzpatrick was named CEO and Scientific Director of MPFI in 2011. Previously, Fitzpatrick was the James B. Duke Professor of Neuroscience at the Duke University School of Medicine and was the Founding Director of the Duke Institute for Brain Sciences. Fitzpatrick's professional awards for his research accomplishments include the Alfred P. Sloan Research Award, the Cajal Club Cortical Discoverer Award, and the McKnight Neuroscience Investigator Award. Dr. Fitzpatrick has also served on many scientific advisory boards including the Searle Scholars Program, the German Research Foundation (DFG), the RIKEN Brain Science Institute, the Max Planck Institute for Neurobiology, and the National Institute of Health (NIH). Dr. Fitzpatrick also served as a Senior Editor for the Journal of Neuroscience, among other scientific publications.

Ryohei Yasuda was named as the second Scientific Director of MPFI in 2012. He has a PhD in physics from Keio University Graduate School of Science and Technology in Yokohama, Japan. From 2000 to 2005, he was a postdoctoral fellow at the Cold Spring Harbor Laboratory and was an assistant professor of Neurobiology at Duke University Medical Center from 2005 to 2012. Yasuda also served as an Early Career Scientist at the Howard Hughes Medical Institute from 2009 to 2012. Yasuda's professional awards for his research accomplishments include the Career Award at the Scientific Interface from the Burroughs Wellcome Fund, the Alfred P. Sloan Research Fellowship, the New investigator Award from the Alzheimer's Association, and the Research Award for Innovative Neuroscience from the Society for Neuroscience.

Lin Tian was named the third Scientific Director of MPFI in 2023. Her lab focuses on genetically encoded indicators. Tian's grants and awards for her accomplishments include a $1M W.M. Keck Foundation Award and a Rita Allen Foundation Scholar award.

=== Discoveries ===
In 2013, a research study led by MPFI's Scientific Director, Ryohei Yasuda, discovered a signaling protein involved in the neuronal dysfunction seen in Alzheimer's Disease. This study showed that reduction in production of the protein, centaurin-1 (CentA1), using RNA silencing techniques led to amelioration of Alzheimer's-related symptoms in neurons.

== Facilities ==
MPFI opened a 3-story, 100,000-square-foot (9,300 m^{2}) research facility on the John D. MacArthur Campus of the Florida Atlantic University's Honors Campus in Jupiter, Florida in 2012. Almost 58,000 square feet (5,400 m^{2}) of the building is dedicated laboratory space, including guest labs for visiting scientists. The building also includes a 100-seat auditorium.

The MPFI building was designed by the Washington, D.C. architectural firm, ZGF Architects LLP and built by DPR Construction. The building meets the requirements of the US Green Building Council's LEED-NC accreditation program and has incorporated laboratory-specific energy-use reduction recommendations from the US Department of Energy's Lab 21 environmental performance criteria.
