= Julie G. Pilitsis =

American neurosurgeon and academic administrator

- Education: Rensselaer Polytechnic Institute; Albany Medical College; Wayne State University; Fayetteville State University
- Scientific career
- Fields: Functional neurosurgery
- Workplaces: Albany Medical College; Florida Atlantic University; University of Arizona
- Doctoral advisor: John W. Phillis
- Other academic advisors: Vincent Verdile

Julie G. Pilitsis is an American neurosurgeon and academic administrator. She is the chair of the neurosurgery department at the University of Arizona College of Medicine – Tucson. Pilitsis served as the dean of the Charles E. Schmidt College of Medicine at Florida Atlantic University from 2022 to 2023.

== Life ==
Pilitsis was born to Dorothy Wrazin and John Pilitsis. She earned a B.S. in biology, magna cum laude from Rensselaer Polytechnic Institute in 1996. She received a M.D. with distinction from the Albany Medical College (AMC) in 1998. She completed a Ph.D. in physiology from Wayne State University (WSU) in 2002. Her dissertation was titled, The Effect of Stroke and Other Cerebral Insults on the Release of Free Fatty Acids. John W. Phillis was her doctoral advisor. Pilitsis conducted a residency and internship in the WSU department of neurosurgery from 1998 to 2006. From 2006 to 2007, she completed a functional neurosurgery fellowship at the Rush University Medical Center. Pilitsis earned a M.B.A. with a concentration in health informatics from Fayetteville State University in 2021.

For five years, Pilitisis was a division chief of functional neurosurgery and chair and professor of the basic neuroscience department at AMC. Vincent Verdile was one of her mentors at AMC. From 2013 to 2014, she chaired the Women in Neurosurgery section of the American Association of Neurological Surgeons/Congress of Neurological Surgeons. From February 2022 to July 2023, Pilitisis was the dean of the Charles E. Schmidt College of Medicine at Florida Atlantic University (FAU). She was succeeded by interim dean Curtis Whitehair. She was the first female neurosurgeon to serve as the dean of a medical school. From July to December 2023, Pilitsis was the FAU vice president for medical and strategic initiatives. On January 8, 2024, Pilitsis joined the University of Arizona College of Medicine – Tucson as the chair of the department of neurosurgery and physician executive for functional neurosurgery for the Banner Neurosciences service line. She is the president of the American Society for Stereotactic and Functional Neurosurgery.
