= Lawrence Lottenberg =

American trauma surgeon

Lawrence Lottenberg is an American trauma surgeon, working in South Florida, who is the Chair of Florida Atlantic University (FAU)'s Department of Surgery and the Associate Dean for Academic Affairs and Director of Trauma Research and Education at St. Mary's Medical Center in West Palm Beach, Florida. Lottenberg serves as leadership faculty for FAU's Charles E. Schmidt College of Medicine General Surgery Residency Program. He was also the founding trauma surgeon at UF Health Shands Hospital's Level 1 trauma center in December 2003. Prior to his tenure at University of Florida, he worked at Memorial Healthcare System in Hollywood, Florida.

In July 2021, Lottenberg was interviewed by WFOX-TV regarding watercraft safety after the death of Leon L. Haley, CEO of UF Health Jacksonville who died by head injury caused by a jet ski accident.

He has also studied trauma injuries as a result of fishing and boat safety.

== Education ==
Lottenberg graduated with a B.S. in chemistry from University of Florida in 1971, and completed his Doctor of Medicine (M.D.) degree from University of Miami's Miller School of Medicine in 1975. He completed his internship, residency and fellowship at the Jackson Memorial Hospital.

== Awards and recognitions ==
- President of the Florida chapter of the American College of Surgeons for two years
- Chair for six years and now senior advisory member of the Florida Committee on Trauma
- Raymond H. Alexander Award from the Florida chapter of the American College of Surgeons

=== Other accomplishments ===
In the late 1990s, Lottenberg developed PocketChart Trauma, a trauma-specific program for handheld computers that facilitated patient billing and allowed providers to make notes.
