= Florida Atlantic University High School =

Location
- 777 Glades Road; Boca Raton, Florida 33431; United States; 26°22′24″N 80°5′45″W

Information
- Type: Lab School
- School district: FAU Lab Schools
- Principal: Sherry Bees
- Grades: 9 to 12
- Colors: Blue and red
- Mascot: Owls
- Website: FAU HS Home Page

Florida Atlantic University High School (FAU High School) is a public, laboratory, dual-enrollment high school located on the Boca Raton campus of Florida Atlantic University. It is the only high school in the United States to offer full-time dual-enrollment at a state university to students after completion of 9th grade.

== Overview ==
Founded in 2004 for "students with exceptional academic abilities and strong self-motivation" by University President Frank Brogan, FAU High School operates as an entity under Florida Atlantic University College of Education, the State University System of Florida, and as an independent school district (FAU Lab Schools) which only hosts Alexander D. Henderson University School and FAU High School. Since its inception, the High School has always earned an "A" or "A+" ranking by the Florida Department of Education. Entry to FAU High School as a 9th grader is competitive and consists of a series of standardized test score submissions and interviews. Only a small number of transfer students are accepted into the High School per year.

FAU High School's structure is considered unique in the United States since 9th grade students undergo an accelerated and rigorous curriculum to prepare them for collegiate study. After completion of 9th grade, 10th through 12th grade students are directly enrolled, full-time, at Florida Atlantic University. With the exception of a few limitations concerning Greek life and NCAA Division 1 sports, FAU High School students share many of the same rights and privileges as regular enrolled full-time students, including the ability to declare a major. A typical graduate of FAU High School earns three years worth of college credits towards a bachelor's degree. Since most students earn more than 60 credits, many also earn associate degrees before graduating high school. As of 2023, over 80 students completed their bachelor's degree before graduating from high school. Many students also graduate high school while simultaneously graduating with bachelor's degree. Other students may choose to attend top universities around the nation.

== Research ==
FAU High School has a robust research program within the School that allows students to conduct research, typically focused on physical and natural sciences. As post-9th grade students are considered full-time students at Florida Atlantic University, they have access and are allowed to conduct research directly with the university instead of the High School, working with university professors and even becoming published. FAU High School also hosts the university's Cane Institute for Advanced Technologies which studies complex robotics, machinery, and artificial intelligence.

As a laboratory school, high school students and their parents or legal guardians sign an agreement upon enrollment that they may be subject to approved research studies regarding student success, behavioral and mental health, and social skills. The Florida Atlantic University College of Education also maintains an active teaching and research partnership where undergraduate and graduate students in the College of Education are able to conduct research and teach at FAU High School.

As part of their research program, FAU High School also maintains partnerships with the Max Planck Florida Institute for Neuroscience, Scripps Research, and Charles E.Schmidt College of Medicine. The Schmidt College of Medicine also provides a pipeline for FAU High School students to pursue their M.D. following high school graduation.

== Sports ==
Because FAU High School students are prohibited from participating in the university's NCAA Division 1 sports until after high school graduation, FAU High School maintains a separate sports program for their students. Current sports include:

- Track and Field
- Cross Country
- Soccer
- Lacrosse
- Basketball
- Volleyball
- Golf
- Swimming
- Tennis

== Recognition ==
FAU High School is considered a National Blue Ribbon School for Excellence and a Green Ribbon School for Sustainability by the U.S. Department of Education, a Reference School by Google, and is a member of the National Consortium for Secondary STEM Schools. In 2022, U.S. News & World Report ranked FAU High School 1st (tied) in the United States in its Graduation Rate Rank category and 1st in the state of Florida in its State Assessment Proficiency Rank category. The School is recognized for producing Forbes 30 under 30 awardees, finalists and semifinalists in the National Merit Scholarship Competition, and Regeneron Scholars. Many FAU High School graduates stay at Florida Atlantic University to finish their degree. Those who do to choose to leave, typically attend ivy league and other top undergraduate and graduate institutions. Several students each year graduate FAU High School and directly enroll into medical school or law school.

== Accreditation ==
FAU High School is recognized as a secondary public school by the Florida Department of Education. It is also recognized by the State University System of Florida as an entity operating under the Florida Atlantic University College of Education.
