= Frank Brogan =

American politician (born 1953)

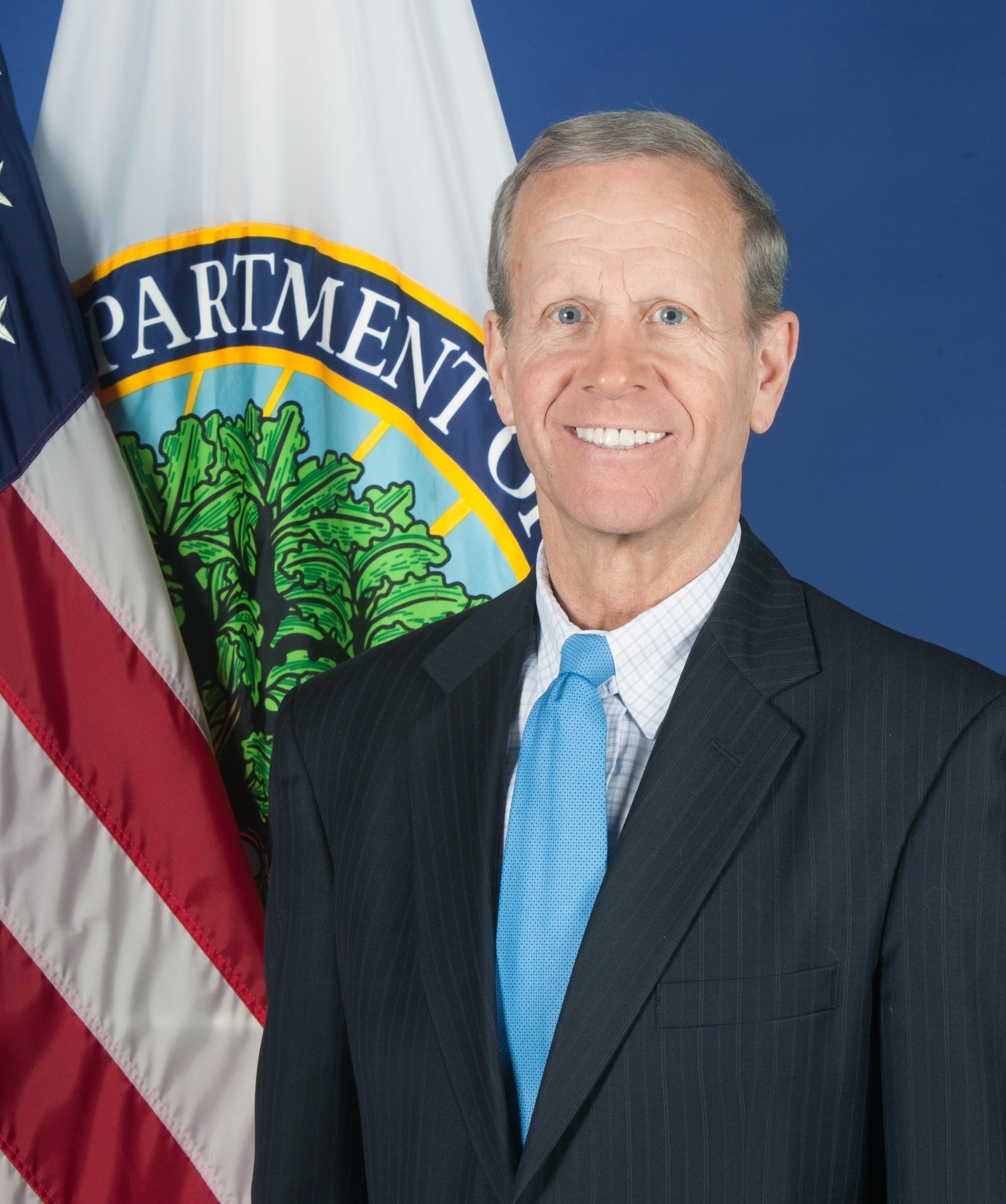
- Official portrait, 2018

Assistant Secretary of Education for Elementary and Secondary Education
- In office June 26, 2018 – January 20, 2021
- President: Donald Trump
- Preceded by: Deborah S. Delisle
- Succeeded by: James Lane (Acting)

4th Chancellor of the Pennsylvania State System of Higher Education
- In office October 1, 2013 – September 1, 2017
- Preceded by: John C. Cavanaugh
- Succeeded by: Daniel Greenstein

10th Chancellor of the State University System of Florida
- In office September 14, 2009 – September 30, 2013
- Preceded by: John Delaney (interim); Mark B. Rosenberg
- Succeeded by: Marshall Criser III

5th President of Florida Atlantic University
- In office March 4, 2003 – September 13, 2009
- Preceded by: Anthony Catanese
- Succeeded by: Mary Jane Saunders

15th Lieutenant Governor of Florida
- In office January 5, 1999 – March 3, 2003
- Governor: Jeb Bush
- Preceded by: Buddy MacKay
- Succeeded by: Toni Jennings

17th Education Commissioner of Florida
- In office January 3, 1995 – January 5, 1999
- Governor: Lawton Chiles; Buddy MacKay
- Preceded by: Doug Jamerson
- Succeeded by: Tom Gallagher

Personal details
- Born: September 6, 1953 (age 73) Lafayette, Indiana, U.S.
- Party: Republican
- Spouses: Mary Brogan (m. 1976; died 1999) Courtney Strickland (m. 2002)
- Education: University of Cincinnati; Florida Atlantic University
- Profession: Academic Administrator

Frank T. Brogan (born September 6, 1953) is an American educator and the former Assistant Secretary of Education (Elementary and Secondary Education). He succeeded Deborah S. Delisle. He is the former Chancellor of the Pennsylvania State System of Higher Education, former Chancellor of the State University System of Florida, and former President of Florida Atlantic University. He served as the 15th lieutenant governor of Florida, serving with Governor Jeb Bush.

== Education ==
In 1976, Frank Brogan became the first member in his family to earn a college degree when he received his bachelor's degree in education magna cum laude from the University of Cincinnati. In 1981, he earned his Master of Arts in Educational leadership from Florida Atlantic University.

On December 18, 2018, Frank Brogan was awarded an honorary doctoral degree from Florida Atlantic University.

== Early career ==
=== Education ===
Brogan began his education career in 1978 in the Martin County, Florida public school district. His first job was teaching fifth grade at Port Salerno Elementary School. It was while teaching at this school that he earned his master's degree in 1981.

Brogan next focused his career on educational administration. He went on to serve as the dean of students at Indiantown Middle School, and then assistant principal, and principal of Murray Middle School. While an administrator, Brogan negotiated a gun away from a student. Brogan was eventually elected to two terms as the Superintendent of Schools in Martin County.

== Politics ==
=== Florida Commissioner of Education ===
In 1994, Brogan was elected Florida Commissioner of Education. In this position he oversaw all education activities in Florida and served as a member of the Florida Cabinet, which oversaw various aspects of state government. He was the youngest education commissioner in Florida's history.

=== Lieutenant Governor of Florida ===
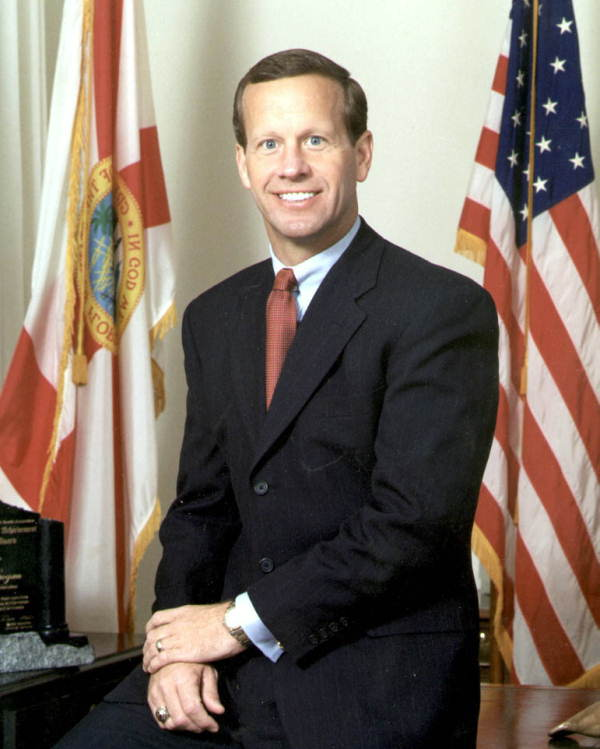
Brogan's Florida Lt. Governor portrait

Brogan was seeking a second term as Education Commissioner when, in 1998, Jeb Bush asked him to be his running mate as lieutenant governor. The Bush/Brogan team won the general election. As lieutenant governor, Brogan oversaw education policy and acted as legislative liaison for the Bush administration. Bush and Brogan were re-elected in 2002; Brogan departed to become president of FAU in 2003.

== Florida Atlantic University ==
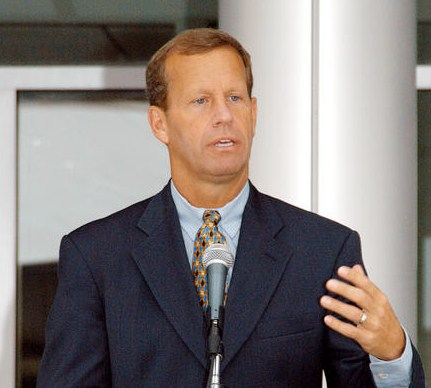
Brogan in 2003

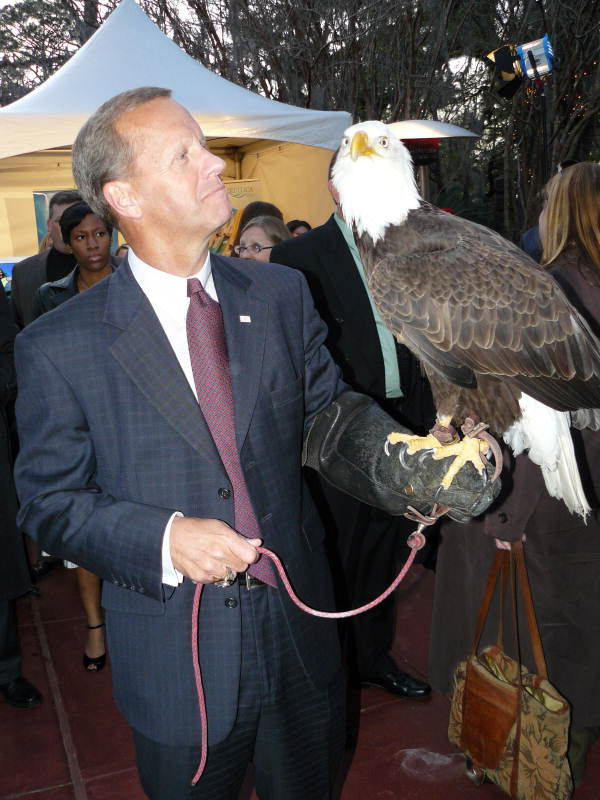
Brogan holding a bald eagle in 2009

Brogan became the fifth president of Florida Atlantic University in 2003 and was reappointed by the FAU Board of Trustees to a second six-year term, which began in 2009, although Brogan quit this position the same year to become Chancellor of the State University System of Florida. Recognizing the region's strong potential to become a center of biomedical research, Brogan has placed special emphasis on creating partnerships between the university and leading research organizations.

He fostered relationships with organizations such as The Scripps Research Institute, the Torrey Pines Institute for Molecular Studies, the Max Planck Society and the H. Lee Moffitt Cancer Center & Research Institute. Additionally, FAU entered into a unique public/private medical school partnership that resulted in the introduction of a complete, four-year medical education program on FAU's Boca Raton campus and the creation of FAU's independent medical school in 2010.

During Brogan's initial six-year term, the university developed its first-ever comprehensive strategic plan, which has provided a roadmap for progress since its inception in 2006. He oversaw the largest physical development of the university's campuses as new facilities were built to serve FAU's undergraduate and graduate population, which surpassed 27,000 for the first time. He presided over the early planning stages of "Innovation Village" on the Boca Raton campus, which doubled the amount of on-campus housing while adding the wellness center, alumni center, football stadium, retail space and additional parking. The stadium and most of these features were developed and completed in the years after Brogan left FAU. In 2009 Brogan became chancellor of the State University System and resigned as president of FAU.

== State University System of Florida ==
Brogan took office as Florida's university system chancellor in 2009 during a time of deep acrimony between the Florida Legislature and the Board of Governors. As the longest-serving chancellor since the creation of the Board of Governors in 2003, his tenure brought a welcome stability for the system. During his tenure, relationships with the Florida Legislature were restored, as evidenced by the landmark governance agreement of 2010 that provided clarity regarding oversight of the university system.

Meanwhile, the university system demonstrated significant progress in providing access to high-quality higher education. During his tenure, the system increased enrollment by 7 percent, increased degree production by 12 percent and saw record high attainment in academic standards, graduation rates, national rankings and research.

The board approved a new 2025 Strategic Plan that includes 39 key performance benchmarks, which is an integral part of Florida's nationally recognized accountability framework that tracks progress of university and system goals. This was part of Brogan's goal for Florida to have "the most accountable university system in America."

During the 2013 legislative session in particular, the university system took several major steps toward further excellence. The board and Legislature worked together to implement a number of top priorities, including establishing a path for universities to reach preeminent status, creating the nation's first fully online institute operated by a public research university, and providing a platform for a performance-funding model that fosters the unique mission of each institution while advancing system goals. The state legislature reversed an earlier $300 million budget cut and added more than $400 million in new funding for operations, facilities and maintenance.

== Pennsylvania State System of Higher Education ==
In October 2013, Brogan left his post as Chancellor of the State University System of Florida to serve as the chancellor of the Pennsylvania State System of Higher Education.

Under his leadership of the PASSHE, the membership of the faculty union, APSCUF, which represents more than 5000 teachers, went on strike for the first time in 34 years, after working for more than 13 months without a contract.

Party political offices
Preceded by Claude R. Kirk Jr.	Republican nominee for Education Commissioner of Florida; 1994	Succeeded by Tom Gallagher
Preceded by Tom Feeney	Republican nominee for Lieutenant Governor of Florida; 1998, 2002	Succeeded by Jeff Kottkamp
Political offices
Preceded by Doug Jamerson	Education Commissioner of Florida; 1995 – 1999	Succeeded by Tom Gallagher
Preceded by Buddy MacKay	Lieutenant Governor of Florida; 1999 – 2003	Succeeded by Toni Jennings
Academic offices
Preceded by Anthony Catanese	President of Florida Atlantic University; 2003 – 2009	Succeeded by Mary Jane Saunders
Preceded by John Delaney	10th Chancellor of the State University System of Florida; 2009 – 2013	Succeeded by Marshall Criser III
Preceded by John C. Cavanaugh	4th Chancellor of the Pennsylvania State System of Higher Education; 2013 – 2017	Succeeded by Daniel Greenstein
