= Pine Jog Environmental Education Center =

Coordinates: 26.6647°N 80.1413°W

The Pine Jog Environmental Education Center is an education center located in Palm Beach County, Florida, United States. The center's mission is to develop, provide and model environmental education programs in order to promote an understanding of the earth and its inhabitants. Established in 1960 by Mr. and Mrs. Alfred G. Kay on 150 acres (0.61 km^{2}) of wilderness, the center today hosts over 25,000 students, 750 teachers and 12,500 adults/families annually. The center is a unit of the College of Education of Florida Atlantic University.

The center and Pine Jog Elementary School, which shares the campus, have LEED Gold certification.
