= Alexander D. Henderson Jr. =

American businessman, financier and philanthropist

- Alexander D. Henderson Jr., ca. 1960

Personal details
- Born: Alexander Dawson Henderson; February 16, 1895 Brooklyn, New York
- Died: July 8, 1964 (aged 69) Boston, Massachusetts
- Spouse(s): Mary Barnes Anthony; Lucia Maria Ernst
- Children: 3
- Education: Dartmouth College
- Profession: Businessman
- Known for: Mayor of Hillsboro Beach
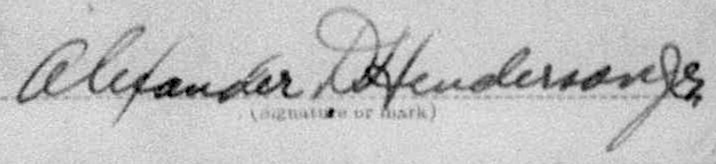
- Signature

Military service
- Allegiance: United States of America
- Branch/service: United States Army
- Years of service: 1917–1919
- Rank: Lieutenant in the Cavalry

Alexander Dawson Henderson Jr. (February 16, 1895) was an American business leader, financier and philanthropist, and long-time mayor of Hillsboro Beach, Florida. He was Vice President and Director of the California Perfume Company (CPC), which later became Avon Products. Henderson is also known for his philanthropy; he created the Hillsboro Country Day School, and is the namesake of the Alexander D. Henderson University School at Florida Atlantic University.

== Early life ==
Alexander D. Henderson was born on February 16, 1895, in Brooklyn, New York.

Alexander D. Henderson was the son of A. D. Henderson of Suffern.

In June 1914, when Henderson was 19, his father took the family on a vacation-business trip to Europe. They saw fields of flowers and bought necessary oils from the French. The family also visited the oil factories that made the perfume for the California Perfume Company.

=== Military high school ===
From 1912 to 1915, Henderson attended the New York Military Academy, a boarding school at Cornwall-on-Hudson, New York, south of Newburgh. By midyear in 1916, he decided to leave Dartmouth and volunteer for the U. S. Army during World War I. On August 15, 1917, he was called into active service and became a 2nd Lieutenant in the High School Cavalry, stationed at Fort Dix, New Jersey. He was also stationed at Company D, Hughes High School in Cincinnati, Ohio. He was promoted 1st Lieutenant on April 8, 1918.

== Career ==
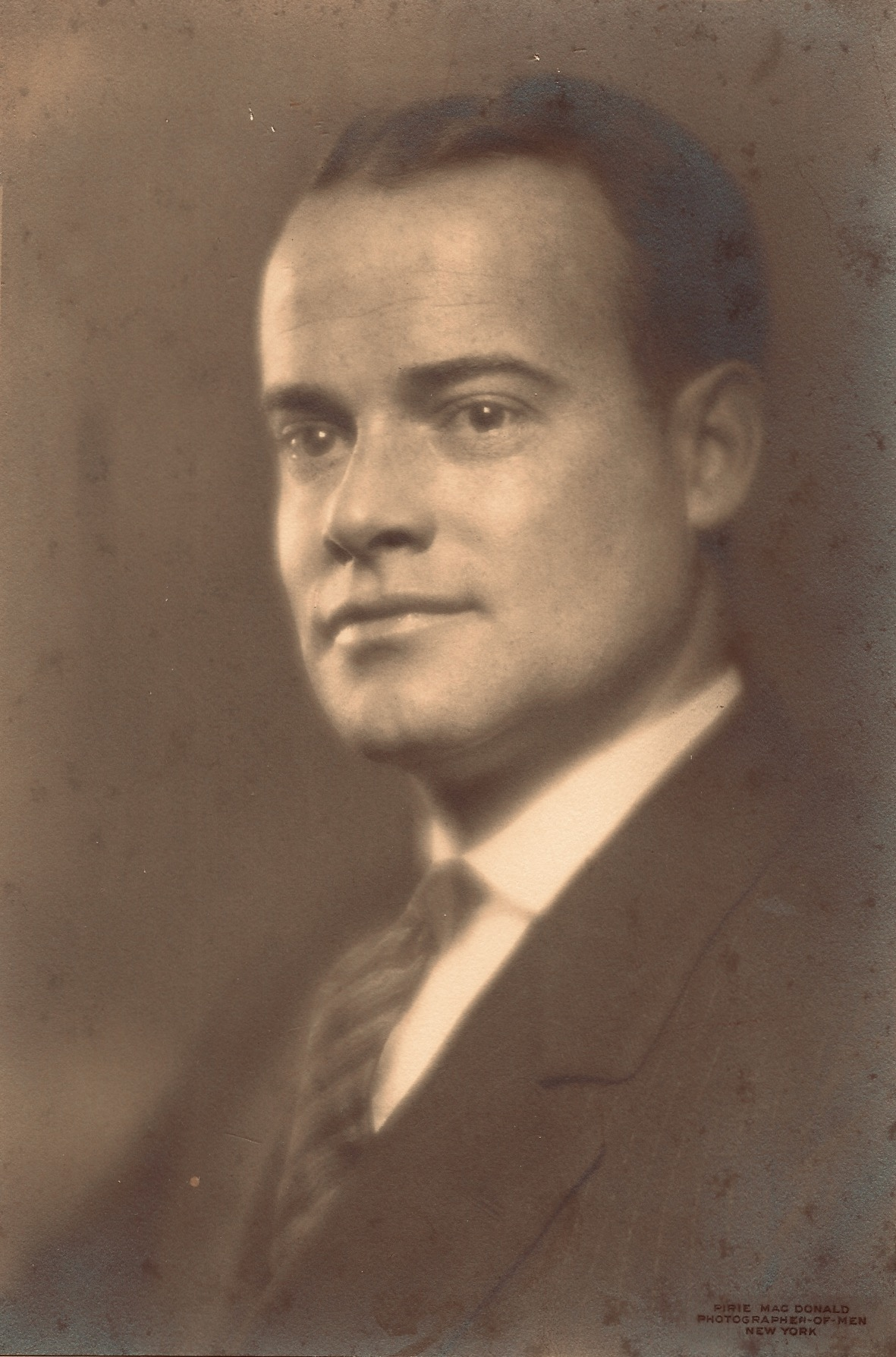
Henderson in 1927

He was the son of Alexander D. Henderson and worked his way up from the bottom of the company beginning in 1916 to become vice president of Avon, and is known as a philanthropist. Alexander D. Henderson, Jr. was a founder and principal benefactor of the Alexander Henderson Private School, a/k/a Alexander D Henderson University School Home & School Association, which is on the campus of the Florida Atlantic University in Boca Raton. “A.D. Henderson is a public school governed by Florida Atlantic University and has no tuition cost.”

On April 12, 1940, Henderson resigned as vice-president of the Allied Products Company of Suffern, after 23 years of service. He remained a director of the company. In 1946, Henderson and his family moved to Hillsboro Beach, Broward County, Florida. Henderson and his brother continued to serve on Avon's Board of Directors.

Henderson became vice mayor of Hillsboro Beach, Florida in 1955. He became the Mayor of Hillsboro Beach in 1958 and held this position for six consecutive years.

== Personal life ==
On February 14, 1920, Henderson married Mary Barnes Billings Anthony in Ridgewood, New Jersey. They had two children, Mary and Alexander. In September 1935, they divorced in Reno, Las Vegas, with Mary charging him with cruelty. On March 28, 1936, Henderson married Lucia Maria Ernst in New York City. They had a son who was born in New York City.

== Death and legacy ==
In 1953, Henderson created the Hillsboro Country Day School in Pompano Beach, Florida. In 1960, a donation from Henderson and his wife Lucy contributed to the construction of the Henderson Behavioral Health facility in Fort Lauderdale, Florida. The clinic was renamed Henderson Clinic of Broward County in 1961.

Henderson died on July 8, 1964. On December 1, 1968, the A.D. Henderson University School at the Florida Atlantic University College of Education was dedicated in his honor. The Chapel of Saint Andrew, located on the campus of Saint Andrew's School in Boca Raton, Florida, was dedicated in memory of Henderson.
