= Cardinal Newman High School (West Palm Beach, Florida) =

Roman Catholic school in Florida, United States

Location
- 512 Spencer Drive; West Palm Beach, Florida 33409; United States; 26°42′38″N 80°5′37″W

Information
- Other names: Cardinal Newman; Newman
- Type: Private, catholic, college prep
- Motto: Educating the whole student: mind, body, and spirit.
- Religious affiliation: Roman Catholic
- Established: 1961
- Oversight: Roman Catholic Diocese of Palm Beach
- NCES School ID: 00256904
- President: Charles Stembler
- Principal: Ed Curtin
- Teaching staff: 37.1 (on an FTE basis)
- Grades: 9–12
- Gender: Co-educational
- Enrollment: 544 (2015–2016)
- Student to teacher ratio: 14.7
- Campus type: Suburban
- Colors: Blue and gold
- Athletics conference: Florida High School Athletic Association (FHSAA)
- Mascot: Crusader
- Team name: Crusaders
- Accreditation: Southern Association of Colleges and Schools
- Publication: Illuminated Manuscript (literary magazine)
- Newspaper: CN Blue & Gold cnbluegold.com
- Tuition: Catholic: $17,900 non-Catholic: $19,400 (2024-25)
- Website: www.cardinalnewman.com

Cardinal Newman High School, also commonly referred to as Cardinal Newman or Newman, is a private college preparatory Roman Catholic school in West Palm Beach, Florida, United States. It is located in the Roman Catholic Diocese of Palm Beach. Founded in September 1961, and named for Cardinal John Henry Newman, it is one of two private Catholic high schools in Palm Beach County, Florida. In 2005, Cardinal Newman was the first Catholic high school in Florida, and one of only a dozen in the United States to offer the International Baccalaureate Diploma Programme.

== History ==
Cardinal Newman High School traces its roots to St. Ann's Catholic School of St. Ann's Parish in downtown West Palm Beach. St. Ann's School opened its doors in 1925 to serve parishes in central Palm Beach County. This school would serve the educational needs of Catholic high school students until the early 1960s. This changed when Archbishop Coleman F. Carroll announced construction of a new high school in West Palm Beach.

In September 1961, a small number of Adrian Dominicans moved from St. Ann's School to the new single building Cardinal Newman High School. "A second classroom building was added within five years, and Archbishop Carroll dedicated a new cafeteria and gymnasium in 1973."

Over the years the school saw a number of additions and improvements, including the John P. Raich Athletic Building in 1985, Crusader Stadium in 1993, and the addition and updating of the lacrosse and softball fields in 2003. In 2006, a track and field facility was added, and the gymnasium was renovated. In 2010, the cafeteria underwent an extensive renovation, and the gym was further updated in the 2012-2013 school year. The school added a dance studio in 2012. The North Building underwent renovations during the 2023-2024 academic year, during which time classes were confined to the South Academic Building.

== Academics ==
Cardinal Newman bases its academic program on local school policy, standards of the Florida Board of Education, and accreditation criteria issued by the Southern Association of Colleges and Schools. Students are required to take 14 semester credits each year during their four years in the following courses: Religion, English, Social Studies, a foreign language, Mathematics, Science, Physical Education, life management, and the arts. Students can also partake in the IB Diploma Program or Advanced Placement courses offered at Newman. Additionally, there is a community service component requiring students to complete a minimum of 25 hours per year serving their community during their time in high school.

== Notable alumni ==
- Jeff Atwater, former Florida Chief Financial Officer and former State Senator
- Laura Bennett, professional triathlete and 2008 and 2012 Olympic games participant
- Scottie Barnes, NBA small forward for the Toronto Raptors
- Jett Beres, musician and member of band Sister Hazel
- John Carney, former professional football placekicker in the NFL
- Matt Cetlinski, Olympic gold medalist in swimming
- John Collins, professional basketball player for the Utah Jazz of the National Basketball Association (NBA)
- Marshall Criser III, President, Piedmont University
- Abram Elam, former American football safety in the NFL for the Cleveland Browns
- Craig Erickson, former University of Miami and NFL quarterback
- Mark Foley, a former Republican politician in the U.S. House
- Jacoby Ford, former American football wide receiver for the Oakland Raiders of the National Football League (NFL)
- Bradley Grace, musician and member of Post Hardcore band Poison The Well
- Chris T. Jones, former American football wide receiver in the NFL for the Philadelphia Eagles
- Brooks Koepka, professional golfer on the PGA Tour, five-time major championship winner, and former world number one
- Theresa LePore, the former Supervisor of Elections for Palm Beach County, Florida, who designed the "butterfly ballot" used in the 2000 presidential election
- David Manning, former professional baseball player
- Jackie Manuel, former UNC basketball player
- Rev. Kevin F. O’Brien, S.J., Jesuit priest, educator, theologian and author; 29th President of Santa Clara University
- Travis Rudolph, NFL wide receiver
- Eddie Shannon, former point guard for the Adelaide 36ers in the NBL
