= Marshall Criser III =

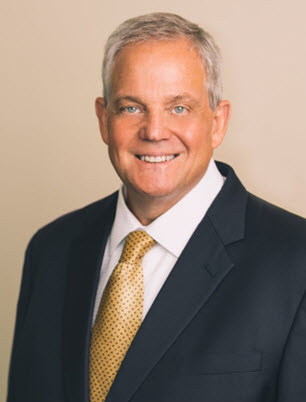

14th President of Piedmont University
- Incumbent
- Assumed office January 1, 2023
- Preceded by: James F. Mellichamp

11th Chancellor of the State University System of Florida
- In office January 6, 2014 – December 31, 2022
- Preceded by: Frank Brogan
- Succeeded by: Ray Rodrigues

Personal details
- Born: September 1958 (age 67–68)
- Spouse: Kimberly Criser
- Children: 4
- Education: University of Florida; INSEAD
- Profession: Corporate executive Academic administrator

Marshall McAllister Criser III (born September 1958) is the president of Piedmont University.

He was previously the president of AT&T Florida, and worked for AT&T and its predecessor, BellSouth, since 1980. He took office as the chancellor of the State University System of Florida on January 6, 2014. The Florida Board of Governors of the State University System selected him unanimously for the post in November 2013, to succeed Frank Brogan.

At the time of his appointment as chancellor, Criser was in his fourth year as the Florida House of Representatives speaker's appointee to the Higher Education Coordinating Council. He is a member of the Scripps Research Institute Board of Trustees in California and the Florida Council of 100, where he is a former chairman. His community service includes terms as the vice chairman of the University of Florida's Board of Trustees, chairman of the Florida Chamber of Commerce, and chairman of Florida TaxWatch.

A Florida native, Criser graduated from Cardinal Newman High School in 1976 and then from the University of Florida with a bachelor's degree in business administration in 1980, and later completed an Advanced Management Programme at INSEAD in Fontainebleau, France.

On December 2, 2022, it was announced that Marshall Criser would be the next president of Piedmont University. He assumed the role on January 1, 2023.

He and his wife, Kimberly, have four daughters. He is the son of Marshall Criser, who served as the president of the University of Florida from 1984 to 1989.
