= Patricia McKay =

Patricia A. McKay is an American accountant.

She is a partner with the public accounting firm of Templeton & Company, which provides accounting, audit, tax and consulting services to clients from its South Florida offices in West Palm Beach and Fort Lauderdale. Prior to joining Templeton, she served as the executive vice president and the chief financial officer of Office Depot, where she had also served on its board of directors. Prior to that position, she was the executive vice president and chief financial officer of Restoration Hardware. In addition, she has held senior finance leadership positions at AutoNation, and Dole Food Company. She began her career with an international accounting firm where she served as an audit manager. In 2007, she was recognized as one of the "100 Most Influential People in Finance" by Treasury & Risk Magazine. Most recently, she was nominated as an Influential Business Woman by The South Florida Business Journal, inducted into the FAU National Alumni Association Hall of Fame and serves on the FAU Foundation Board. McKay holds a bachelor's degree in Business Administration from Florida Atlantic University.
