= Florida Atlantic University College of Engineering and Computer Science =

The FAU College of Engineering and Computer Science is located in Boca Raton, Florida and is one of the ten academic colleges of Florida Atlantic University. The College offers undergraduate and graduate degrees in engineering, computer and applied sciences. The College hosts the University's Ocean Engineering program which was the first undergraduate ocean engineering program in the United States.

== Departments ==
The College of Engineering and Computer Science is divided into the following departments:

- Civil Engineering
- Computer Science and Engineering
- Electrical Engineering
- Environmental Engineering
- Geomatics Engineering
- Mechanical Engineering
- Ocean Engineering

== Research ==
Florida Atlantic was the first university in the country to offer an undergraduate degree in ocean engineering in 1964. The first class numbering 35 graduated in 1967. The program was created in response to the loss of the Navy's submarine USS Thresher off the coast of Massachusetts. The sub and its crew were lost after a test dive and found in 8,400 feet of water, far below the sub's crush depth. Concerned about underwater equipment designed by engineers with no marine experience, FAU and the Navy established a program that would eventually draw students from around the globe and be recognized in the 1996 Guinness Book of World Records for "the fastest speed attained by a human-powered propeller submarine."

== Accreditation ==
The College is fully accredited through the University by the Southern Association of Colleges and Schools Commission on Colleges.
