= University Press (Florida Atlantic University) =

- Type: Weekly student newspaper
- Format: Magazine
- Owner: Florida Atlantic University
- Editor-in-chief: Angelina Martell
- Founded: 1998
- Headquarters: Boca Raton, Florida
- Price: Free
- Website: www.upressonline.com

The University Press, also commonly referred to as the UP, is the student-run magazine of Florida Atlantic University in Boca Raton, Florida, US. The magazine is published semimonthly during the fall and spring semesters. The current editor-in-chief is Sofia De la Espriella.

== History ==
The UP in its current form was established in 1998 after being shut down for a period of nine months. It restarted up as a broadsheet but since has changed its format to a tabloid or magazine sized paper.

The University Press and FAU's student government have clashed a number of times in recent years. In 2004, the student government tried to lock the paper's staff out of their offices, cut their funding, and fire their adviser. This resulted from claims that UP staff were not conducting their required office hours. The UP countered that the student government was instead retaliating following a story that the student government's leaders gave themselves a 25%, 6-month retroactive pay raise without public comment. The situation was resolved after the University Press' adviser received a letter of reprimand from the student government.

The UP redesigned its online product and added daily news, blogs, videos from OwlTV and music from Owl Radio in 2007. The redesigned their online package again in 2010. In May 2010, longtime adviser Michael Koretzky was let go after 12 years because of a reorganization of the university's student media. However, he continues to advise the paper on a volunteer basis.

== Editor selection ==
The UP's editor selection was modeled after the University of Florida's student-run newspaper. The student body president, outgoing editor-in-chief, a professional journalist, a faculty member and the University Press' adviser sit on a panel to determine the next semester's editor. The five judges interview candidates during an open meeting. Once the judges are finished interviewing the candidates, the audience is allowed to ask questions. At the end of the process the judges openly cast their votes.

In fall 2010, Florida Atlantic University's Department of Student Affairs declared the editor selection process "emotional terrorism" and implemented a new selection process. While similar to the old selection, student employees at the UP have complained that the new process is "neutered." As a result, the official Spring 2011 editor selection was augmented with a "fake" editor selection held in the old style.

== Awards ==
Society of Professional Journalists' Region 3 Mark of Excellence Awards

- 2009 – General News Reporting (Second place) – University Press series on campus safety
- 2009 – Feature Photography (Second place) – Stephanie Colaianni
- 2006 – InDepth Reporting (First place) – Jason Parsley for "Missing Treasure"
- 2006 – Feature Writing (Second Place) – Jason Parsley for "Unchecked"
- 2002 – General News Reporting (First place) Kelly Tyko

The Associated Collegiate Press

- 2007 – Reporter of the Year (Second Place) – Jason Parsley
- 2005 – News Story of the Year — Lily Ladeira and Rick Smith for "Hush Money"

The Society of Professional Journalists' South Florida Chapter's Sunshine State Awards

- 2009 – College Journalist of the Year — Michele Boyet
- 2006 – College Journalist of the Year — Jason Parsley

Institute on Political Journalism

- 2007 – Robert Novak Collegiate Journalism Award — First Prize ($5,000) – Jason Parsley

Best of Collegiate Design

- 2009 – Category 11 Cover (special section) – First Prize — Susan Wiesenberg

Campus Coverage Project scholarship recipient (national)

- 2011 – Investigative Reporters and Editors — Gideon Grudo
- 2010 – Investigative Reporters and Editors – Devin Desjarlais
- 2010 – Investigative Reporters and Editors — Karla Bowsher

City Link Magazine

- 2010 – Best Student Newspaper in South Florida

The New York Times

- 2011 – The New York Times Student Journalism Institute selectee (national) – Sergio N. Candido

Society of Professional Journalists

- 2010 – Robert D.G. Lewis First Amendment Award (national) – Michele Boyet
