= Anthony Catanese =

American academic administrator

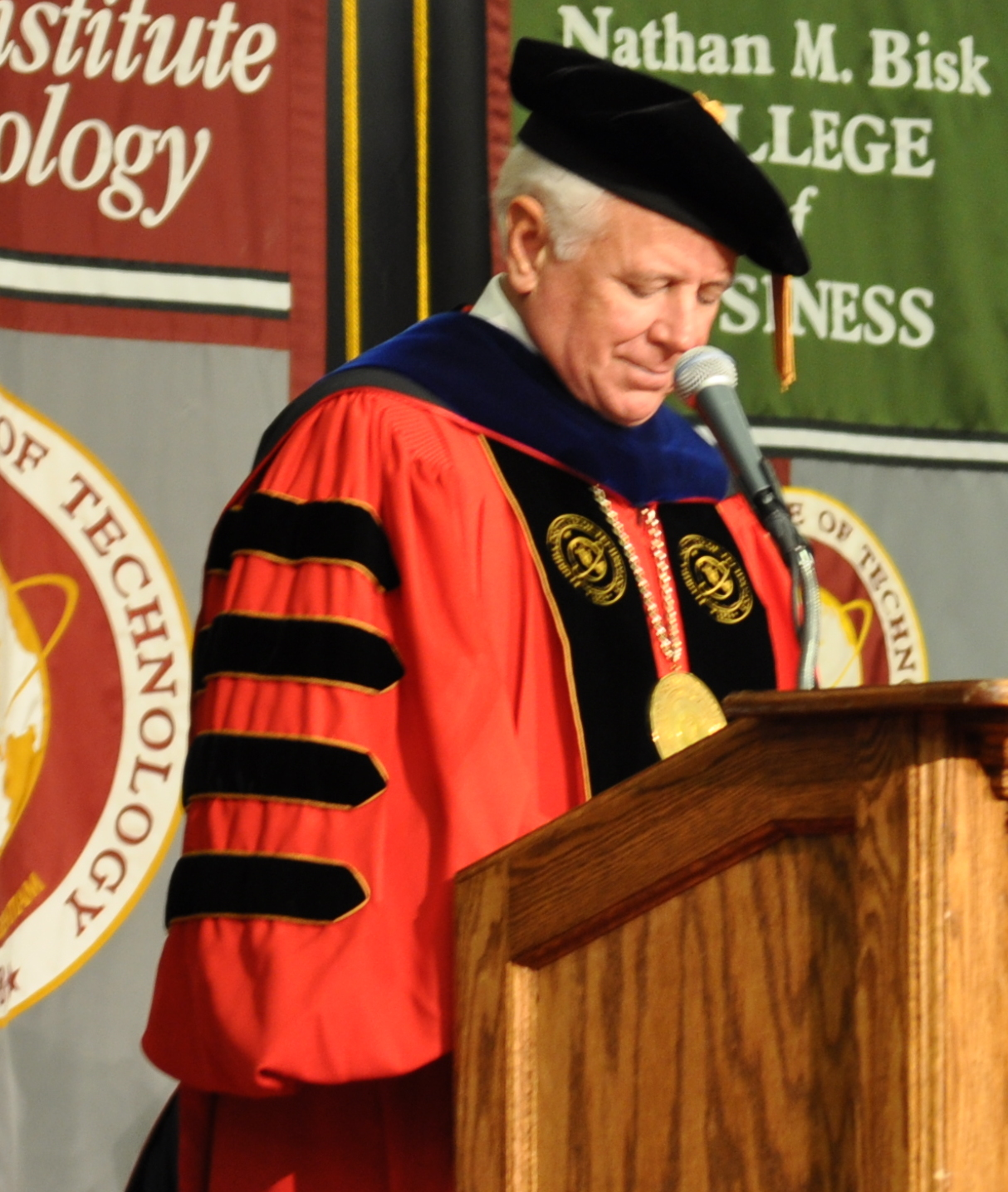

President of Florida Institute of Technology
- In office 2002–2016
- Preceded by: Lynn E. Weaver
- Succeeded by: T. Dwayne McCay

Personal details
- Spouse: Sara Catanese
- Education: Rutgers University, New York University, University of Wisconsin–Milwaukee
- Profession: President and CEO of the Florida Institute of Technology
- Website: fit.edu/president/

Anthony James Catanese is an American university administrator, author, and a former president and CEO of the Florida Institute of Technology. Prior to his position at the Florida Institute of Technology, Catanese was president of Florida Atlantic University. Catanese previously served as president and chairman of the President's council of the Sunshine State Conference.

He has also held university administration positions at Pratt Institute in New York City, the University of Wisconsin–Milwaukee, the University of Miami and the Georgia Institute of Technology. Catanese was Senior Fulbright Professor at the Pontificia Universidad Javeriana in Bogotá, Colombia.

== Education ==
Catanese received a bachelor's degree in city and regional planning from Rutgers University in 1963. He received a master's degree in urban planning from New York University in 1966 and Ph.D. in urban and regional planning in 1969 from the University of Wisconsin–Madison.

Prior to his career in academic administration, Catanese maintained a private practice in design, planning and development.

== Career ==
Catanese was provost of Pratt Institute in New York City, dean of the School of Architecture and Urban Planning at the University of Wisconsin–Milwaukee, associate dean of the School of Engineering and Environmental Design and James A. Ryder Professor at the University of Miami and professor and director of the Center for Planning and Development at the Georgia Institute of Technology. He has also held the position of Senior Fulbright Professor at the Pontificia Universidad Javeriana in Bogotá, Colombia.

He served as the dean of the College of Architecture at the University of Florida from 1986 to 1989. During this term, he was also a professor of architecture and planning at the university. After his term at the University of Florida, Catanese began his term as President of Florida Atlantic University in January 1990. During his term as president, Catanese led an initiative to start a Division I football team at the university. In 2003, as a parting gift, the Florida Atlantic University foundation, a charitable foundation that supports the school illegally funneled $42,000 to Catanese for the purchase of a Corvette. Police suggested that both Catanese and his wife be charged with felonies as a result of the scandal. In 1998, prior to these allegations of misconduct, he was awarded the Sons of Italy Foundation Achievement Award. A year later, Catanese was awarded the Sun-Sentinel's Excalibur Award.

Catanese was elected as a Fellow of the American Institute of Certified Planners in 2001. In 2002, he was named the most outstanding university president in the Southeastern United States by the Council for Advancement and Support of Education (CASE), the largest association of educational institutions in the world.

Catanese became the president of the Florida Institute of Technology that year. In 2003, Catanese assembled an administrative team at the university and appointed T. Dwayne McCay as provost and chief academic officer. During his term, Catanese increased the number of students attending the university and achieved and maintained a Tier 1 Best National University ranking from U.S. News & World Report. He also expanded the athletic program to 21 sports and improved athletic facilities.

He was elected as the president of the Sunshine State Conference for the 2007–2008 and 2008–2009 academic years. In 2008, construction on the Ruth Funk Center for Textile Arts began at the Florida Institute of Technology under Catanese. It is the only textiles center of its kind in Florida. Catenese launched a $50 million capital campaign for the university's Golden Anniversary that year. The following year the campaign exceeded its goal and raised approximately $60 million. The Independent Colleges and Universities of Florida President's Council elected Catanese to serve a two-year term as chairman in 2010. He also served as president or chair of the Florida Association of Colleges and Universities and the Florida Campus Compact.

In September 2011, Catanese was presented the Brevard Bar Foundation's inaugural Community Leadership Award. He was recognized for establishing a pre-law program at the Florida Institute of Technology and organizing an advisory committee of members of the Brevard Bar Association.

Catanese was inducted into the Florida Institute of Technology's Sports Hall of Fame in February 2014 for his contribution to the university's athletics program. Under his presidential term, a football team, men's and women's golf, men's and women's lacrosse, women's soccer, men's and women's swimming, men's and women's tennis and men's and women's track & field were added to the university's athletics program. The following month, he was inducted into the Brevard Walk of Fame. The Brevard Walk of Fame recognizes leaders in Central Florida who contributed to the community.

He has authored thirteen books, eighteen chapters in books, over sixty-five articles in academic journals and thirty-five research monographs.

== Personal life ==
He is married to Sara Catanese and has three children.

Academic offices
Preceded by Helen Popovich	President of Florida Atlantic University; 1990 –2002	Succeeded by Frank Brogan
Preceded by Lynn E. Weaver	President of the Florida Institute of Technology; 2002 –2016	Succeeded by T. Dwayne McCay
