= Florida Atlantic University College of Education =

Academic college of Florida Atlantic University, Boca Raton, Florida

Coordinates: 26.119988°N 80.141341°W

The FAU College of Education is located in Boca Raton, Florida and is one of the ten academic colleges of Florida Atlantic University It offers education degree programs at the undergraduate and graduate levels. The College of Education is one of the original colleges that opened when Florida Atlantic University first began offering courses in 1964.

== Overview ==
As of 2007, enrollment in the College of Education totaled 3,253 or 13% of Florida Atlantic University's total student body. Elementary Education is the top undergraduate major at the university based on total headcount enrollments. The College actively holds teaching partnerships with A.D. Henderson School and Florida Atlantic University High School.

== Alexander D. Henderson University School ==
The Alexander D. Henderson University School is a public elementary and middle school (K-8) and legislated school district operating as an educational laboratory on the FAU's Boca Raton campus. The school is rated an "A+ School" by the Florida Department of Education. This ranking is determined based on student scores on the Florida Comprehensive Assessment Test. The Henderson School is also a U.S. Department of Education Blue Ribbon School.

== FAU Pine Jog Environmental Education Center ==
The college also operates the Pine Jog Environmental Education Center. Pine Jog serves over 25,000 students, 750 teachers, and 12,500 families annually from Palm Beach County and surrounding counties.

== Accreditation ==
The College is fully accredited through the University by the Southern Association of Colleges and Schools Commission on Colleges. It is also accredited by the National Council for Accreditation of Teacher Education.
