= Mary Jane Saunders =

American academic

President of Florida Atlantic University
- In office 2010–2013
- Preceded by: Frank Brogan
- Succeeded by: Dennis Crudele (interim)

Personal details
- Born: Worcester, Massachusetts, U.S.
- Spouse: George R. Newkome
- Education: Boston University (B.A.) University of Massachusetts Amherst (M.Sc., Ph.D.)
- Occupation: Academic administrator, biologist

Mary Jane Saunders is an American academic who served as president of Florida Atlantic University from 2010 to 2013. She has a background in scientific research and administration, specializing in biology.

Saunders is originally from Worcester, Massachusetts. She completed a B.A. in biology at Boston University, and then pursued further studies at the University of Massachusetts Amherst, completing an M.Sc. and a Ph.D. in botany. She is married to chemistry professor George R. Newkome. After a period as an associate professor at Louisiana State University, she joined South Florida University in 1986, eventually becoming director of its Institute of Biomolecular Science. She also worked at the National Science Foundation for a period as a program officer and deputy division director.

In 2003, Saunders joined Cleveland State University, Ohio, as a biology professor and director of the Biomedical and Health Institute. She was later made dean of the College of Science, and from 2007 was provost and executive vice-president. In 2010, Saunders left CSU to replace Frank Brogan as president of Florida Atlantic University. She resigned as president in May 2013, citing "fiercely negative media coverage" as one of the reasons for her decision. During her tenure, the university was criticized for awarding naming rights for FAU Stadium to GEO Group, a private prison company, and for its handling of associate professor James Tracy's promotion of Sandy Hook massacre conspiracy theories; during protests against the naming rights decision, she performed a hit-and-run on a student protestor with her university-provided Lexus.
