= Daniel Greenstein =

American librarian

Daniel Greenstein is an American librarian. He was director of the "postsecondary success strategy" program at the Bill & Melinda Gates Foundation. In 2018, he was named the fifth chancellor of Pennsylvania's State System of Higher Education. He is also a board member of Ridge-Lane Limited Partners, a venture capital firm.

== Career ==
While directing the Gates Foundation's Postsecondary Success division, he worked with other higher education leaders nationwide on initiatives intended to boost educational-attainment, in particular among low-income and minority students. Before joining the Gates Foundation, he was Vice Provost for Academic Planning, Programs, and Coordination at the University of California's Office of the President, where he was responsible for a range of information, publishing, and broadcast services (the California Digital Library, the University of California Press, and UCTV), off-campus instructional programs (e.g. Education Abroad) as well as academic planning and accountability. With Christopher Edley, he led an initiative to evaluate the effectiveness of online instruction in UC's undergraduate curriculum and, more generally, as a strategy for expanding access to high-quality university education.

Greenstein has served as Director of the California Digital Library (2002–7), of the Digital Library Federation (1999–2002) and was founding director of the Arts and Humanities Data Service and co-director of the Resource Discovery Network, both in the UK. He holds degrees from the University of Oxford (DPhil), where he was a member of Corpus Christi College, and Pennsylvania (MA, BA) and began his career as a member of the history faculty at the University of Glasgow.

As chancellor of the Pennsylvania State System of Higher Education (PASSHE), Greenstein faced criticism in 2021 for threatening to dissolve the system, which led to state representative Peter Schweyer calling for his resignation. He also came under fire for a workforce reduction mandate he ordered during his tenure, which failed to meet contract requirements and was later litigated at the state level in Pennsylvania's Commonwealth Court. Greeinstein announced his pending resignation on July 23, 2024. In September 2024, Baker Tilly, a public accounting firm, announced that Greenstein would be joining the company in November of the same year.
