= Torrey Pines Institute for Molecular Studies =

American biomedical research institute

Coordinates: 27.2580°N 80.4284°W

Torrey Pines Institute for Molecular Studies, also commonly referred to as TPIMS, is a non-profit biomedical research institute "dedicated to the discovery of causes, treatments and cures for a wide variety of diseases and afflictions including heart disease, cancer, AIDS, diabetes, multiple sclerosis, Alzheimer's, aging-relating conditions, and pain management. Torrey Pines Institute for Molecular Studies is a 501(c)(3) research center dedicated to conducting basic research to advance the understanding of human disease and the improvement of human health.

Torrey Pines' scientists conduct research in fields associated with a wide variety of major medical conditions, including multiple sclerosis, cancer, heart disease, Types I and II diabetes, pain management, Alzheimer's, inflammatory disorders, AIDS and other infectious diseases, regenerative medicine, obesity, transplant rejection, muscle wasting syndrome, rheumatoid arthritis and new methods for drug discovery.

Techniques created by Torrey Pines Institute include individual compounds arrays, mixture-based synthetic combinatorial libraries, positional scanning deconvolution, biometrical analysis, libraries from libraries, small molecule and heterocyclic compounds, and direct in-vivo testing of mixtures.
