= Charles E. Schmidt College of Medicine =

Medical school of Florida Atlantic University

Coordinates: 26.373345°N 80.100463°W

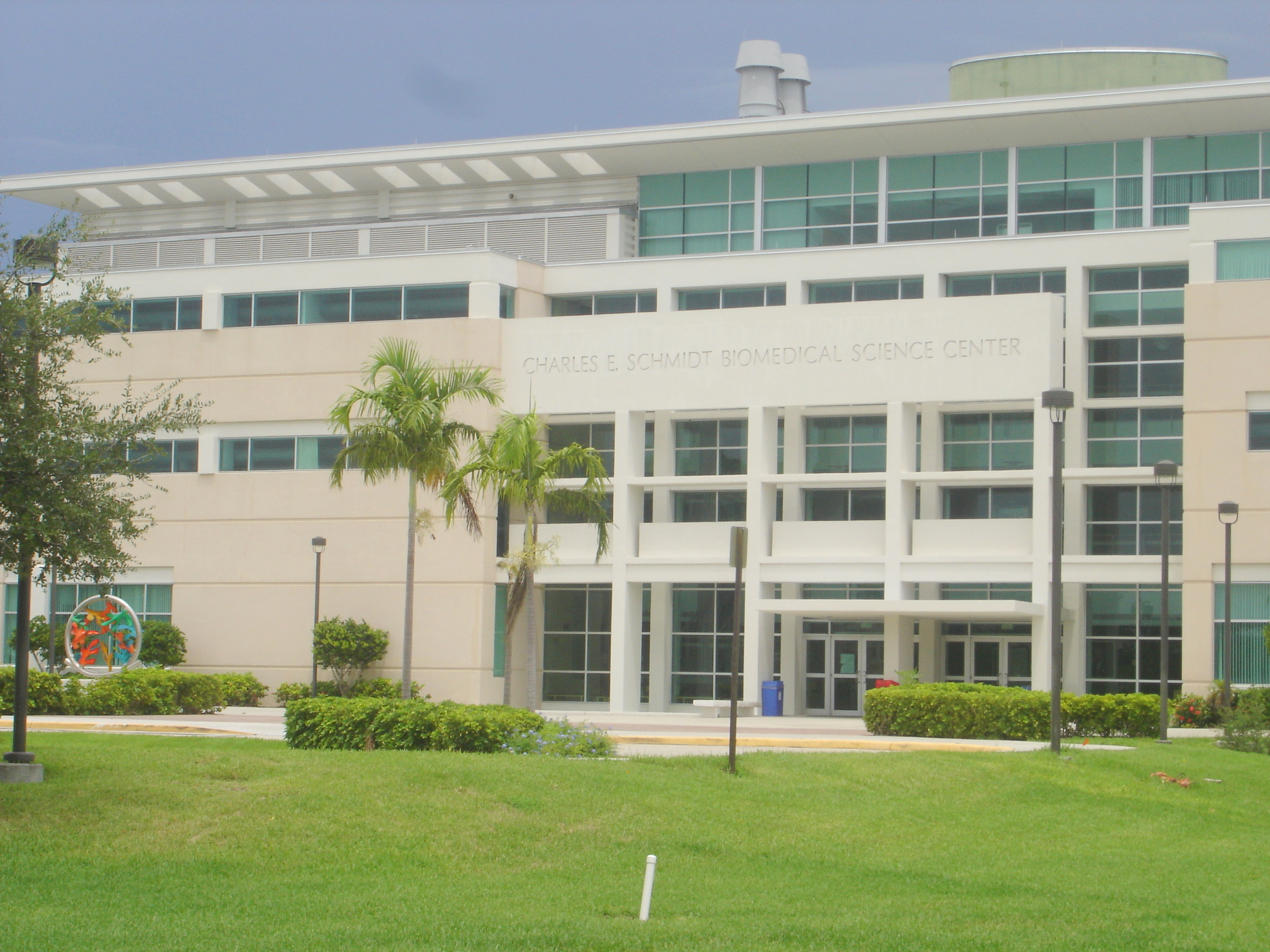
- Type: Public medical school
- Established: 2011
- Parent institution: Florida Atlantic University
- Dean: Lewis S. Nelson, M.D.
- Academic staff: 202
- Students: Medicine: 320
- Location: Boca Raton, Florida, USA
- Website: www.fau.edu/medicine/

The Charles E. Schmidt College of Medicine is the medical school of Florida Atlantic University located in Boca Raton, Florida. The college offers the degrees of Doctor of Medicine (M.D.), Doctor of Philosophy (Ph.D.), and a master's in biomedical science.

In the Spring of 2010, FAU launched its own independent medical school, the Charles E. Schmidt College of Medicine, as the 134th medical school in the United States. The inaugural class was welcomed in August 2011. In 2015, The Charles E. Schmidt College of Medicine earned full accreditation from the LCME for its MD degree. Accreditation signifies that national standards for function, structure, and performance are met by the medical school's education program.

In the fall of 2011, the FAU Charles E. Schmidt College of Medicine Graduate Medical Education (GME) Consortium was formed with five Palm Beach County hospitals: Bethesda Hospital East; Boca Raton Regional Hospital; and Tenet HealthCare system's Delray Medical Center, St. Mary's Medical Center, and West Boca Medical Center.

The Charles E. Schmidt College of Medicine opened up FAU's first University-sponsored residency in internal medicine, and commenced with the first class of 36 residents in July 2014.

In 2016, the college's general surgery residency program was approved for a total of 45 clinical positions and up to seven positions for a unique value-added year of scholarship and research, making this program one of the largest in the nation. The college formed a Department of Surgery in 2016, which includes faculty in general surgery and its various sub-specialties, as well as orthopedics, neurosurgery, urology, ophthalmology, and otolaryngology/head and neck surgery, among others.

FAU's emergency medicine residency program was approved in 2016 for a total of 18 positions, with the first class of six residents who matched in 2017. Resident rotations in the program include emergency medicine, trauma, medical ICU, surgical ICU, pediatric ICU, and anesthesia.

Since 2017, FAU was approved for a 4-year psychiatry residency program, a 4-year neurology residency program, and a 3-year cardiology fellowship program. All programs welcomed their first classes on July 1, 2018.

University Sponsored Residency and Fellowship Programs
Residencies	Fellowships
Internal Medicine	Cardiovascular Disease
General Surgery	Geriatric Medicine
Emergency Medicine	Hospice and Palliative Medicine
Neurology	Vascular Surgery
Psychiatry	Pulmonary Critical Care Medicine
	Emergency Medical Services

The college also hosts multiple graduate degree programs, including thesis and non-thesis MS programs in Biomedical Science, a PhD track in Integrated Biomedical Science, and an MD/PhD program with The Scripps Research Institute in Jupiter, Florida. There is also a newly established MD/MBA program with the FAU College of Business which lets you complete your MD and MBA in 4 years.
