= Florida Atlantic University =

Public university in Boca Raton, Florida, US

- Motto: "Where Tomorrow Begins."
- Type: Public research university
- Established: July 15, 1961; 65 years ago
- Parent institution: State University System of Florida
- Accreditation: SACS
- Academic affiliations: CUMU; ORAU; sea-grant; space-grant
- Endowment: $295.1 million (2024)
- President: Adam Hasner
- Provost: Russell Ivy (interim)
- Students: 32,185 (fall 2025)
- Undergraduates: 25,626 (fall 2025)
- Postgraduates: 6,559 (fall 2025)
- Location: Boca Raton, Florida, United States; 26.371°N 80.102°W
- Campus: 850 acres (340 ha); Small city
- Other campuses: Dania Beach; Davie; Fort Lauderdale; Fort Pierce; Jupiter
- Newspaper: University Press
- Colors: Blue and red
- Nickname: Owls
- Sporting affiliations: NCAA Division I FBS – The American; ASUN; CUSA
- Mascots: Owlsley; Hoot
- Website: fau.edu

Florida Atlantic University (Florida Atlantic or FAU) is a public research university with its main campus in Boca Raton, Florida, United States. The university is a member of the State University System of Florida and has satellite campuses in Dania Beach, Davie, Fort Lauderdale, Jupiter, and Fort Pierce. FAU was established as Florida's fifth public university and is classified among "R1: Doctoral Universities – Very High Research Activity".

FAU has quickly grown to become one of the largest institutions in the state by enrollment. Florida Atlantic offers more than 180 undergraduate and graduate degree programs within its 10 colleges. The university is accredited by the Southern Association of Colleges and Schools (SACS).

FAU opened in 1964 as the first public university in the Miami metro area, offering only upper-division and graduate-level courses. Initial enrollment was only 867 students, increasing in 1984 when the university admitted its first lower-division undergraduate students. As of 2021, its enrollment had grown to over 30,000 students representing 180 countries, 50 states, and the District of Columbia. The university has an annual budget of $900 million and an annual economic impact of $6.3 billion. Since 1964, Florida Atlantic University has awarded degrees to over 185,000 alumni.

FAU's intercollegiate sports teams, the Florida Atlantic Owls, compete in National Collegiate Athletic Association (NCAA) Division I and the American Conference (The American). It has 19 varsity athletic teams.

== History ==
=== Establishment ===
On July 15, 1961, to meet the burgeoning educational demands of South Florida, the state legislature passed an act authorizing the establishment of a new university in the city of Boca Raton. Thomas F. Fleming Jr., founder of Boca Raton's First Bank and Trust Company negotiated with the federal government to secure the title to the air base lands and also established the Endowment Corporation to raise money for planning. Florida Atlantic University was built on Boca Raton Army Airfield, a 1940s-era army airbase. During World War II, the airfield served as the Army Air Corps' sole radar training facility. The base was built on the existing Boca Raton Airport and on 5,860 acres (23.7 km^{2}) of adjacent land. A majority of the land was acquired from Japanese-American farmers from the failing Yamato Colony. The land was seized through eminent domain, leaving many Japanese-Americans little recourse in the early days of World War II.

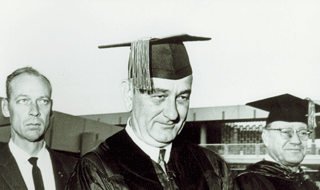
President Lyndon B. Johnson at the university's dedication on October 25, 1964

The airbase was used for radar training, anti-submarine patrols along the coast, and as a stopover point for planes being ferried to Africa and Europe via South America. The airfield was composed of four runways, which are still visible on the Boca Campus today and are mainly used for parking.

By early 1947, the military decided to transfer future radar training operations to Keesler Air Force Base in Mississippi. The departure of the air force in 1947 would leave Boca Raton Army Airfield essentially abandoned.

=== Expansion and growth ===
Florida Atlantic University opened on September 14, 1964, with an initial student body of 867 students in five colleges. The first degree awarded was an honorary doctorate given to President Lyndon B. Johnson on October 25, 1964, at the dedication of the university. At the time of its opening, there were 350 employees, of which 120 were faculty. On-campus housing for students was first added in September 1965, when Algonquin Hall opened.

Florida Atlantic's history is one of continuing expansion as the university's service population has grown. The university originally served only upper-division and graduate-level students, because the state intended the institution "to complement the state's community college system, accepting students who had earned their associate degrees from those institutions."

Florida Atlantic began its expansion beyond a one-campus university in 1971, when it opened its Commercial Boulevard campus in Fort Lauderdale. Due to a rapidly expanding population in South Florida, Florida Atlantic opened its doors to lower-division undergraduate students in 1984. The following year, the university added its third campus in downtown Fort Lauderdale on Las Olas Boulevard.

=== Recent history ===
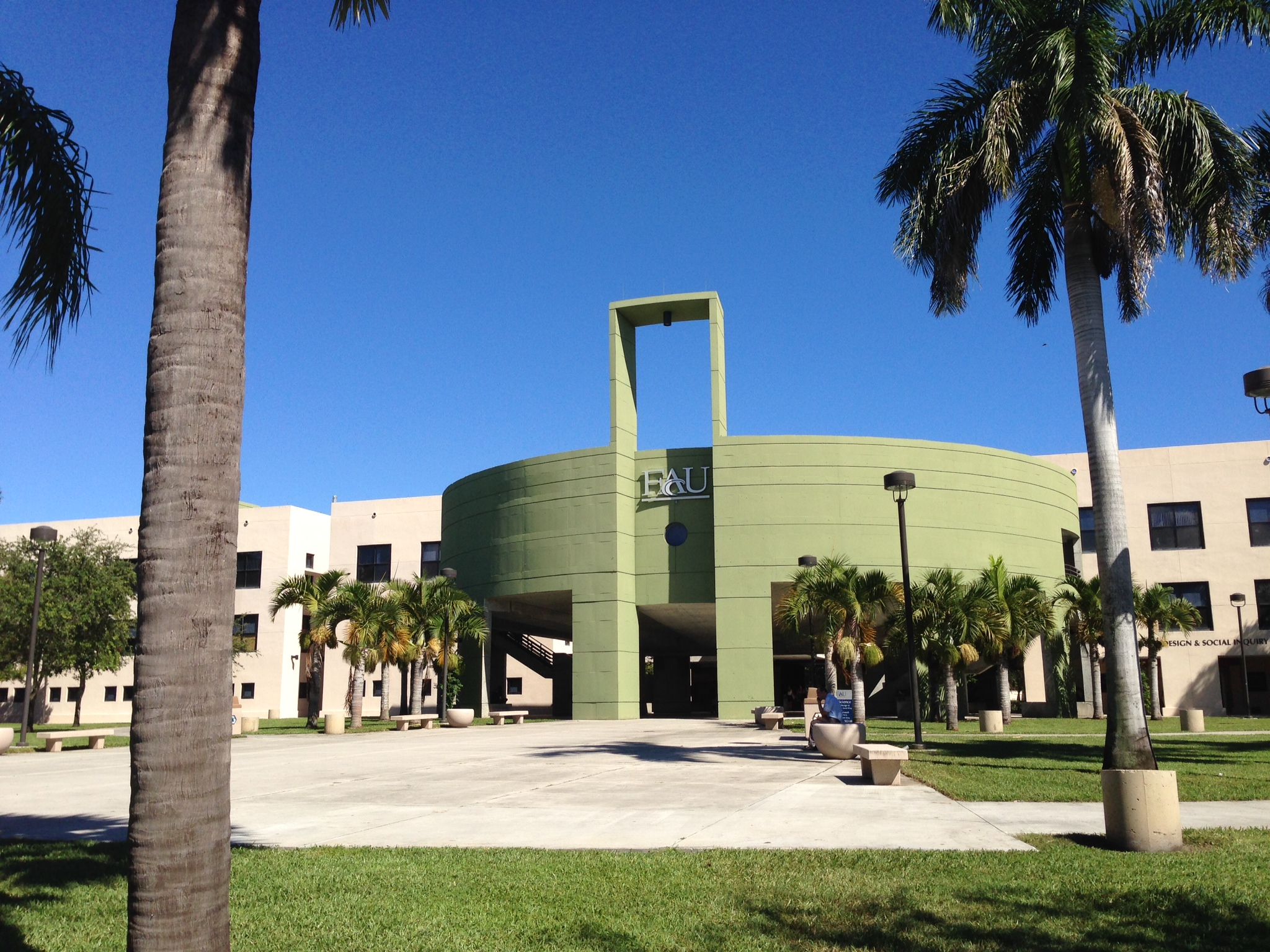
Florida Atlantic University's Social Science Building, Boca Raton campus

In 1989, the Florida Legislature recognized demands for higher education in South Florida by designating Florida Atlantic as the lead state university serving Broward County. To fill this role, the university would establish a campus in City of Davie in western Broward County in 1990 and another in Dania Beach in 1997. Florida Atlantic later purchased 50 acres (20 ha) of land in Port St. Lucie in 1994 to establish a campus on the Treasure Coast. This would be the institution's fifth campus. The university continued its expansion in 1999 when it opened its Jupiter Campus, named for the late John D. MacArthur. This campus houses the university's honors college.

Florida Atlantic University and the University of Miami's Miller School of Medicine established a medical training program within the Charles E. Schmidt College of Biomedical Science in 2004. Plans originally called for the construction of a new teaching hospital in coordination with Boca Raton Community Hospital on the main campus. Following successive budget deficits in 2007, the hospital delayed its participation indefinitely. However, Florida Atlantic later established its own College of Medicine in 2010. The Harbor Branch Oceanographic Institution (HBOI) also joined the university in 2007, creating Florida Atlantic's seventh campus. To bring HBOI into the university, the Florida Legislature allocated $44 million to Florida Atlantic to acquire the institution.

Florida Atlantic has changed dramatically since its opening in 1964. There are now more than 30,000 students attending classes on seven campuses spread across 120 miles (193 km). The university consists of ten colleges and employs more than 3,200 faculty and staff. As of 2020, the university's endowment was over $240 million.

Since its founding, the university has been led by seven presidents. The university's immediate past president is Mary Jane Saunders. She was named president on March 3, 2010, then resigned on May 15, 2013. Her appointment followed the resignation of Frank Brogan. Brogan, a former Lieutenant Governor of Florida, left the university in late 2009 to become Chancellor of the State University System of Florida. Past university presidents also included Anthony J. Catanese, Helen Popovich, Glenwood Creech, and Kenneth Rast Williams. On January 17, 2014, the Board of Trustees announced the selection of John W. Kelly, formerly a vice president of Clemson University, to be the seventh president of the university with a starting date of March 1, 2014.

== Academics ==
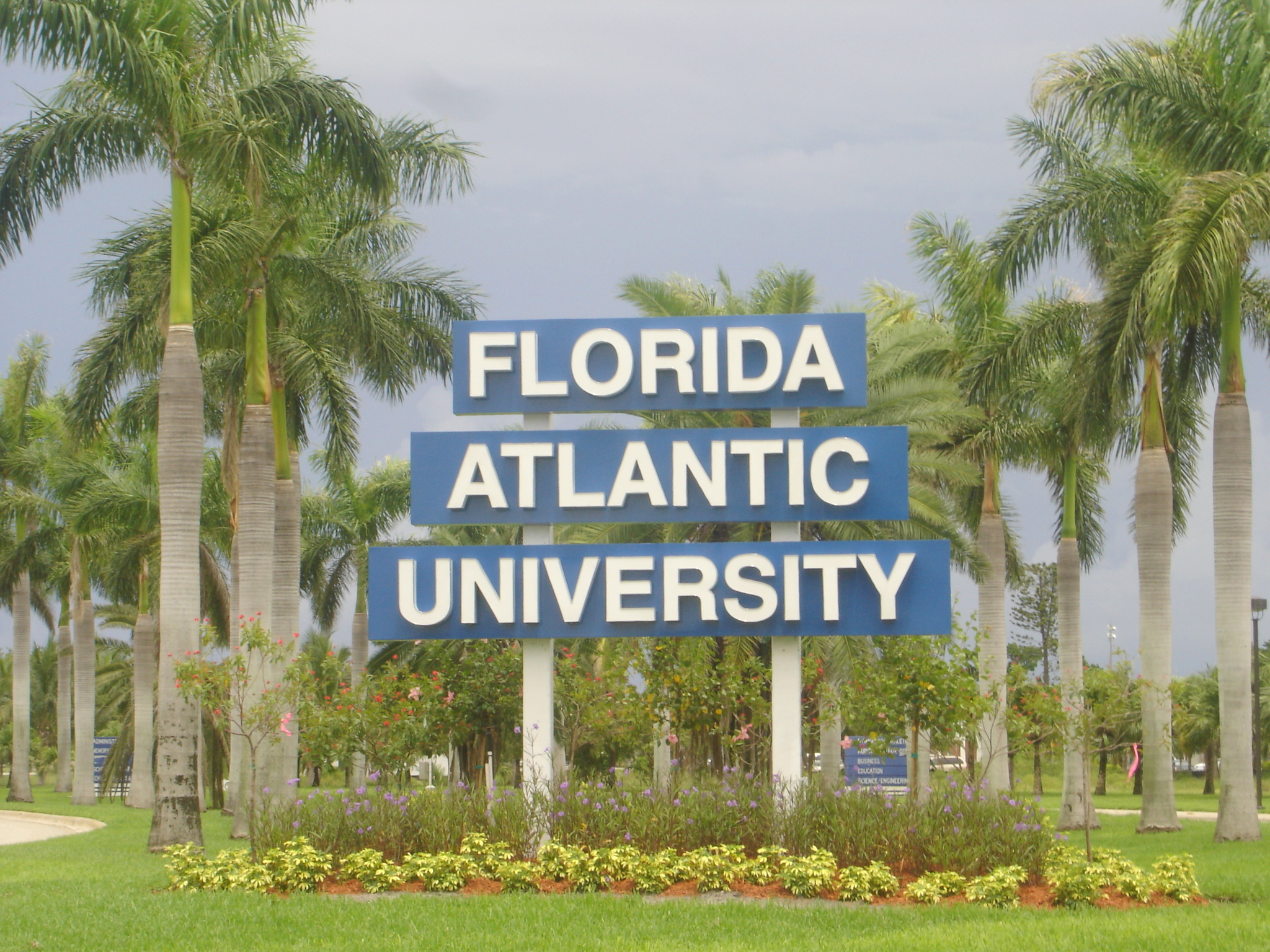
The NW 20th Street entrance sign, Boca Raton campus

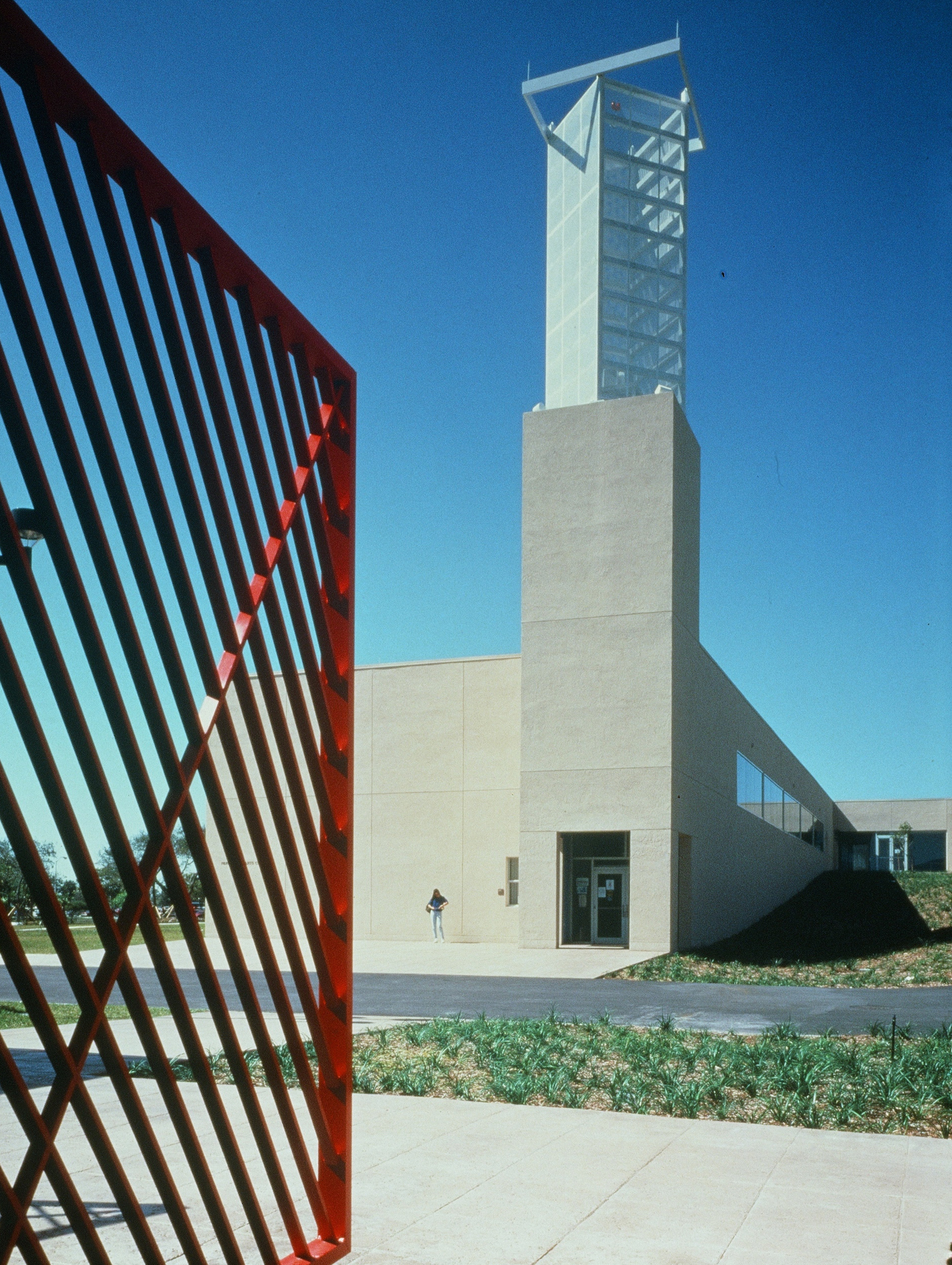
The Dorothy F. Schmidt College of Arts and Letters Campus Tower. Florida State AIA 1995 Award winner, designed by Edward Larrabee Barnes and John MY Lee Architects.

As of 2021, the university's student body consisted of 24,663 undergraduates, 3,380 graduate students, 440 doctoral students, and 254 medical students. In 2021, the undergraduate student body consisted of 61% ethnic minorities and includes students from more than 180 countries. Florida Atlantic has long ranked as the most racially, ethnically, and culturally diverse institution in Florida's State University System. U.S. News & World Report has ranked FAU the 27th most diverse university in the nation. For the incoming freshman class of fall 2021, the acceptance rate was 60%.

The university has ten colleges which offer over 180 different bachelor's, master's and doctoral degree programs: the Charles E. Schmidt College of Science, Charles E. Schmidt College of Medicine, Christine E. Lynn College of Nursing, College of Social Work and Criminal Justice, College of Business, College of Education, College of Engineering and Computer Science, Dorothy F. Schmidt College of Arts and Letters, Harriet L. Wilkes Honors College, and the Graduate College.

The university offers two honors options: the Harriet L. Wilkes Honors College and a University Scholars Program. The Wilkes Honors College is located on the John D. MacArthur campus in Jupiter, Florida. It offers a liberal arts education in the context of a public university, yet is comparable to a private liberal arts college. The Boca Raton campus houses the University Scholars Program, which offers special honors seminars, forums, courses, and advanced course substitution for freshmen.

The fall 2021 incoming freshmen profile for the middle 50% was a 3.73–4.33 high school GPA, a 23–29 ACT composite score, and an 1100–1270 SAT total score. Additional admission requirements are needed for the Harriet L. Wilkes Honors College, the School of Architecture, the College of Engineering and Computer Science, and the College of Science.

The average class size at FAU for undergraduates is 33 students, and for graduate classes, 12 students. The student-to-faculty ratio is 20:1. The top three undergraduate majors by enrollment are elementary education, accounting, and management, respectively. The top three graduate majors by enrollment are business administration, educational leadership, and accounting, respectively. The average age for first-year students is 18; however, the average age for all undergraduates is 24, and the average age for graduate students is 33. The average 4-year graduation rate in 2021 was 47.5%.

Enrichment opportunities include internships, hands-on research, study abroad experiences, and 310 student clubs and organizations. The Lifelong Learning Society operates programs that serve the educational interests of more than 19,000 senior citizens by providing classes focusing on subjects of specific interest and audit options for regular university classes. Under the university's Commercial Music Program, Hoot/Wisdom Recordings was created in 2002, enabling students to work in all creative and business aspects of the music industry. This program generated music that landed a Top 10 spot on Billboard's Hot R&B/Hip-Hop Singles Sales Chart during its first week of release. The university offers financial education programs in its computer lab. A second lab provides full audio/visual connectivity and additional workstations. Florida Atlantic allows local financial businesses to use its computer labs and facilities for training.

=== Rankings ===
Academic rankings

National
- Forbes: 188
- U.S. News & World Report: 183 (tie)
- Washington Monthly: 46
- WSJ/College Pulse: 183

Global
- ARWU: 801–900
- QS: 1001-1200
- THE: 801–1,000
- U.S. News & World Report: 1,067 (tie)

National Program Rankings (as of 2026)
Biological Sciences	203 (tie)
Business	Unranked
Chemistry	171 (tie)
Computer Science	133 (tie)
Earth Sciences	132 (tie)
Education	95 (tie)
Engineering	142 (tie)
Fine Arts	169 (tie)
Mathematics	148 (tie)
Medicine: Primary Care	Tier 3
Medicine: Research	Tier 3
Nursing: Doctorate	86 (tie)
Nursing: Master's	60 (tie)
Physics	165 (tie)
Psychology	124 (tie)
Public Affairs	80 (tie)
Rehabilitation Counseling	36 (tie)
Social Work	83 (tie)
Speech-Language Pathology	204 (tie)

For 2025, U.S. News & World Report ranked Florida Atlantic University as the 103rd best public university in the United States, and 189th overall among all national universities, public and private.

In 2023, U.S. News & World Report ranked the undergraduate nursing, business, and engineering programs 93rd, 164th, and 165th nationally, respectively.

The university was named one of the "Best Southeastern Colleges" in the United States by the Princeton Review for 2023.

In 2024, Florida Atlantic was ranked 41st in the nation by Washington Monthly in their 2024 National University Rankings.

Forbes ranked FAU 188th out of the top 500 rated private and public colleges and universities in America for the 2024-25 report. FAU was also ranked 84th among public colleges and 44th in the South.

=== Research ===
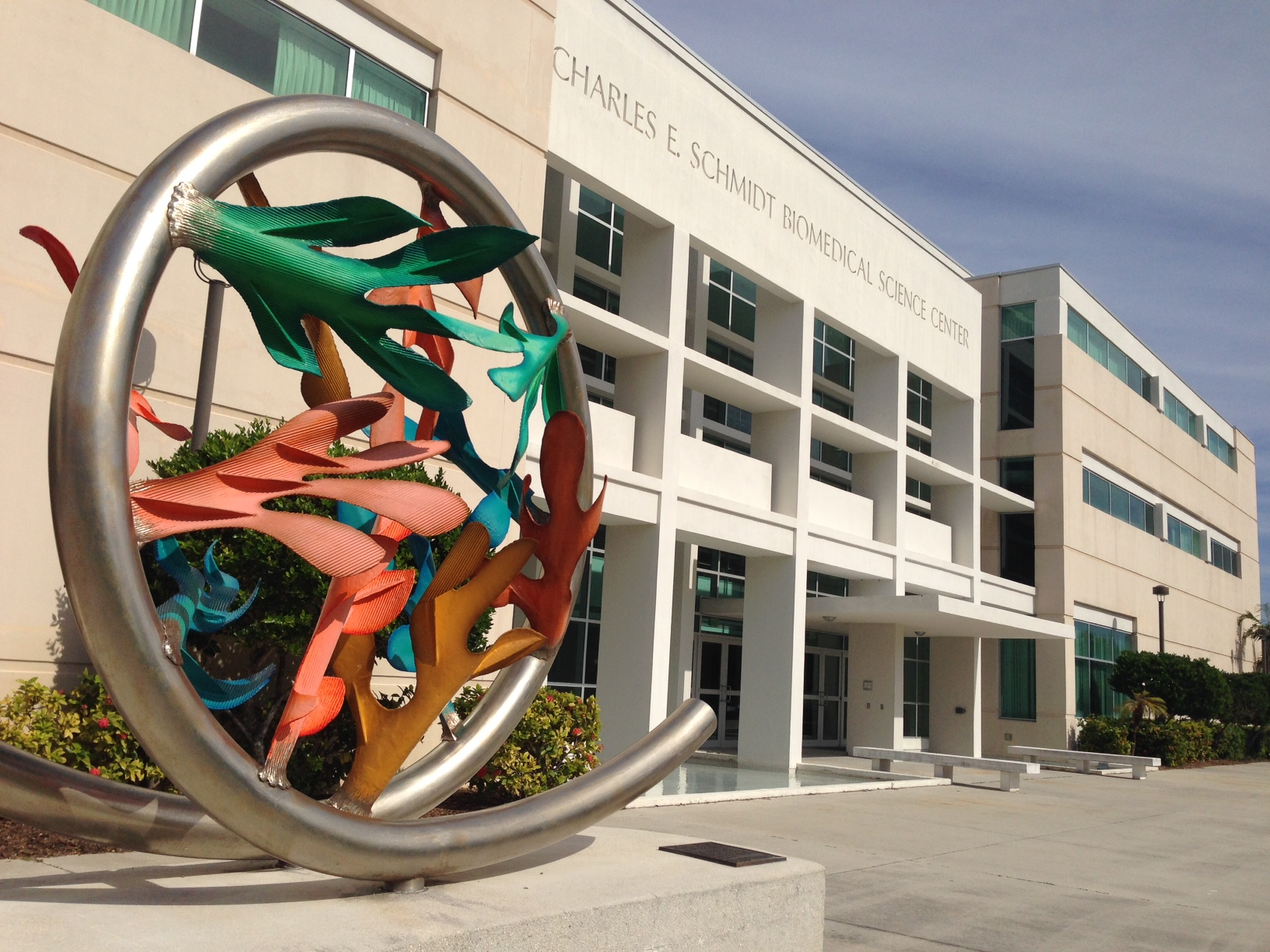
The Charles E. Schmidt College of Medicine on Florida Atlantic University's Boca Raton campus. The sculpture is Orgonelle, designed by Rob Fisher.

FAU is classified as a Research University with Very High Research Activity. The university has established notable partnerships with major research institutions such as the Scripps Research Institute, the Torrey Pines Institute for Molecular Studies, and the Max Planck Society.

The university is the home of two centers of excellence: the Center of Excellence in Biomedical and Marine Biotechnology and the Center for Ocean Energy Technology. These centers have been selected by Florida's Emerging Technology Commission to receive grants to continue and increase their operations. FAU beat out some of Florida's top research universities, including the University of Florida and Florida State University, for the initial funding from the state.

Since receiving its startup funding, Florida Atlantic has secured additional funds from other sources, including federal and private research grants. As a result, both centers have engaged in academic and industry partnerships, combining expertise in ocean engineering, marine biotechnology, functional genomics, proteomics, and bioinformatics. Researchers, scientists, and students at the centers are designing technologies to explore the sea, harvest renewable energy, discover new medicines, and develop new therapeutics to combat agents of bioterrorism. In 2007, as a result of this research, the university and Lockheed Martin announced an exclusive licensing agreement to develop and produce a rapidly deployable and autonomous mooring buoy system for military and scientific uses.

In 2010, the United States Department of Energy designated FAU as one of three national centers for ocean energy research and development. The Southeast National Marine Renewable Energy Center joins centers in the Pacific Northwest (University of Washington and Oregon State University) and in Hawaii (University of Hawaii). The Southeast National Marine Renewable Energy Center is undertaking research and development of technologies capable of generating renewable power from ocean currents and ocean thermal energy.

The university houses both an Imaging Technology Center and a NASA Imaging Technology Space Center. Located in the College of Engineering and Computer Science, the centers specialize in digital imaging research and development for use in both government and commercial applications in the areas of medical technology, surveillance, communications, education, inspection, scientific observation, manufacturing, visual recognition and identification, and motion picture and digital video. The Florida Atlantic Imaging Technology Center is developing a curriculum for digital imaging and processing, thereby establishing Florida Atlantic as the only university in the nation to offer this technical concentration. The NASA Imaging Technology Center is one of 12 NASA Research Partnership Centers throughout the nation which develop dual-use research and development with the participation of NASA and other related industries in the US. The center occupies two sets of laboratories and administrative offices, one on Florida Atlantic's main campus in Boca Raton, the other at the Fort Lauderdale campus.

FAU is affiliated with the Research Park at Florida Atlantic University, with properties in Deerfield Beach and Boca Raton. The Research Park provides outside research facilities for companies which enable them to interact with the university community and its facilities, resources, and expertise. The Research Park operates the Technology Business Incubator, which fosters the start-up and growth of technology-based businesses, seeking to scale them and build relationships for them with the university. The Boca Raton campus is also home to the Center for Complex Systems and Brain Sciences.

== Campus ==
Florida Atlantic University operates six campuses spread across Palm Beach, Broward, and St. Lucie counties. The region is home to more than three million people. The university's main campus is located in the City of Boca Raton in Palm Beach County. The county is also home to the John D. MacArthur Campus located in Jupiter. FAU operates three campuses in the Broward County cities of Dania Beach, Davie, and Fort Lauderdale. Florida Atlantic University also operates a campus in the St. Lucie County city of Fort Pierce. In addition to students who attend classes on the university's campuses, there are 1,612 distance learning students who conduct their studies over the internet or through other means. These students account for 6% of the university's student body.

FAU is a signatory of the American College & University Presidents Climate Commitment and a member of the Association for the Advancement of Sustainability in Higher Education. This commits the institution to ensuring all new construction projects meet the U.S. Green Building Council's Leadership in Energy and Environmental Design (LEED) Silver standards. In 2011, the College of Engineering and Computer Science Building was LEED Platinum certified.

=== Palm Beach County campuses ===
==== Boca Raton ====
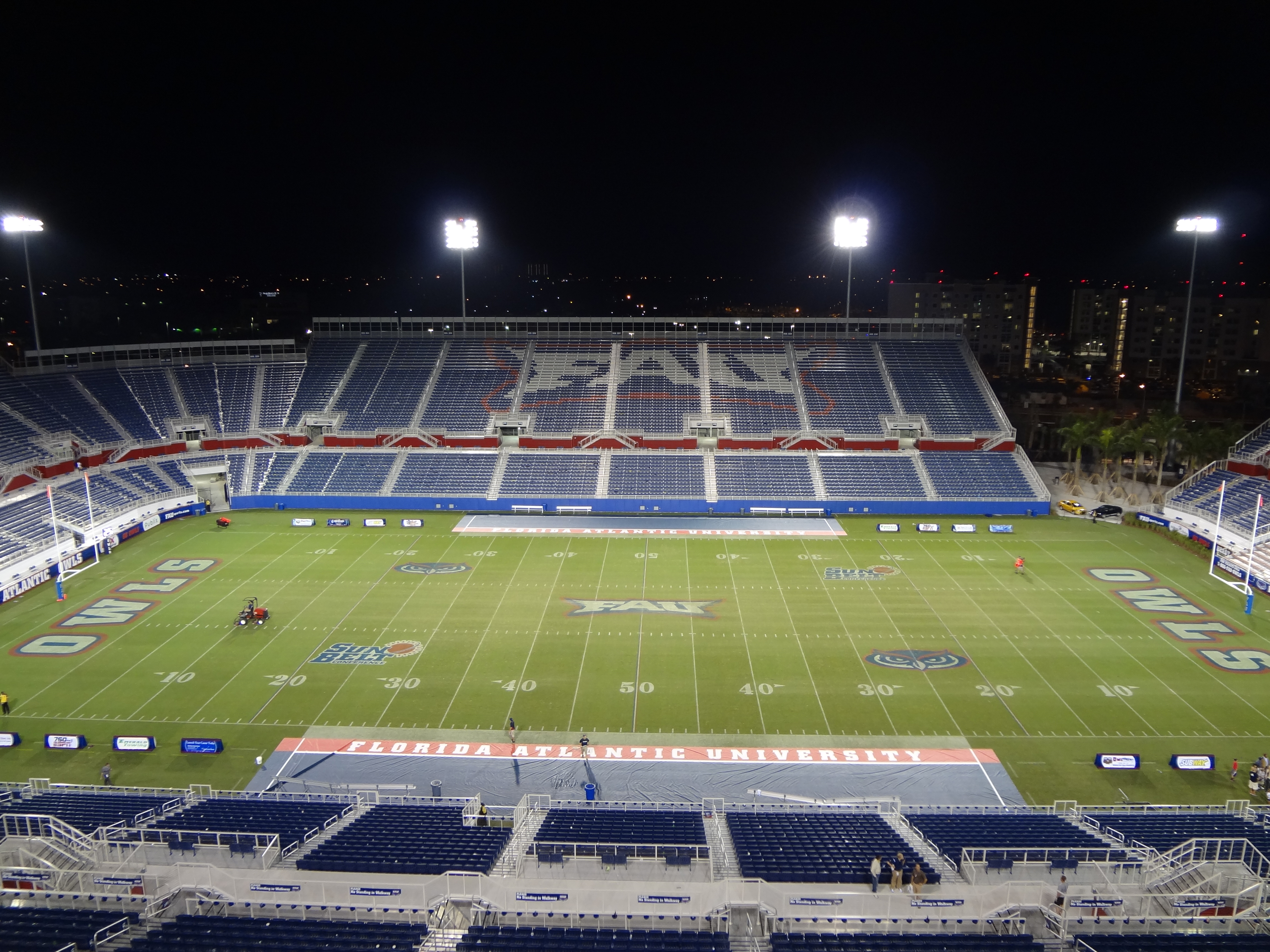
FAU Stadium in Boca Raton

FAU's main campus in Boca Raton was established on the remnants of a World War II American Army airbase in 1964. Spanning 850 acres (3.5 km^{2}), the site is located between the cities of Palm Beach and Fort Lauderdale. The campus was designated a burrowing owl sanctuary in 1971 by the Audubon Society. The owls find the campus appealing because there are few predators, due to the university's proximity to the Boca Raton Airport, and because the campus was originally cleared of vegetation when operating as an airbase during World War II. "The feisty bird, traditionally associated with wisdom and determination, serves as the university's mascot."

The Boca Raton campus is home to a wide variety of university programs and facilities. These facilities include labs and classrooms, student housing, a 6,000-gallon shark tank for aquatic research, a movie theater, athletic and recreational facilities, and the student-run record label Hoot/Wisdom Recordings. In addition to academic and cultural programs, the campus also houses Florida Atlantic's Division I athletics program. The main campus serves approximately 19,077 students, or 70% of the university's student body, offering a number of academic programs, activities, and services.

The Boca Raton campus also houses a number of other institutions, including the A. D. Henderson University School, FAU High School, one of Florida Atlantic University's Research Parks, and the Lifelong Learning Society.

==== Jupiter–John D. MacArthur Campus ====
In addition to the Boca Raton campus in southern Palm Beach County, FAU operates a campus in northern Palm Beach County, in Jupiter. The John D. MacArthur Campus, named after businessman and philanthropist John D. MacArthur, was established in 1999 to serve residents of central and northern Palm Beach and southern Martin counties. The MacArthur Campus occupies 45 acres (0.18 km^{2}), upon which are eight classroom and office buildings, a library, a 500-seat auditorium, three residence halls, a dining hall, a museum building, and a utility plant. The MacArthur Campus also houses the Harriet L. Wilkes Honors College, Scripps Florida, FAU Brain Institute, and the Max Planck Florida Institute for Neuroscience. The campus serves approximately 1,262 students, or 4% of the university's student body.

=== Broward County campuses ===
==== Dania Beach–SeaTech ====
The Dania Beach Campus, also known as SeaTech, was founded in 1997 as a state-funded Type II research center. The institute is part of FAU's Department of Ocean Engineering which was founded in 1965 as the first ocean engineering undergraduate program in the nation. The campus is located on 8 acres (0.03 km^{2}) of land between the Atlantic Ocean and the Intracoastal Waterway. SeaTech is home to university faculty and students engaged in sponsored ocean engineering research and development in the areas of acoustics, marine vehicles, hydrodynamics, physical oceanography, marine materials, and nanocomposites. The Dania Beach Campus serves approximately 70 students, roughly 1% of the university's total student body.

==== Davie ====
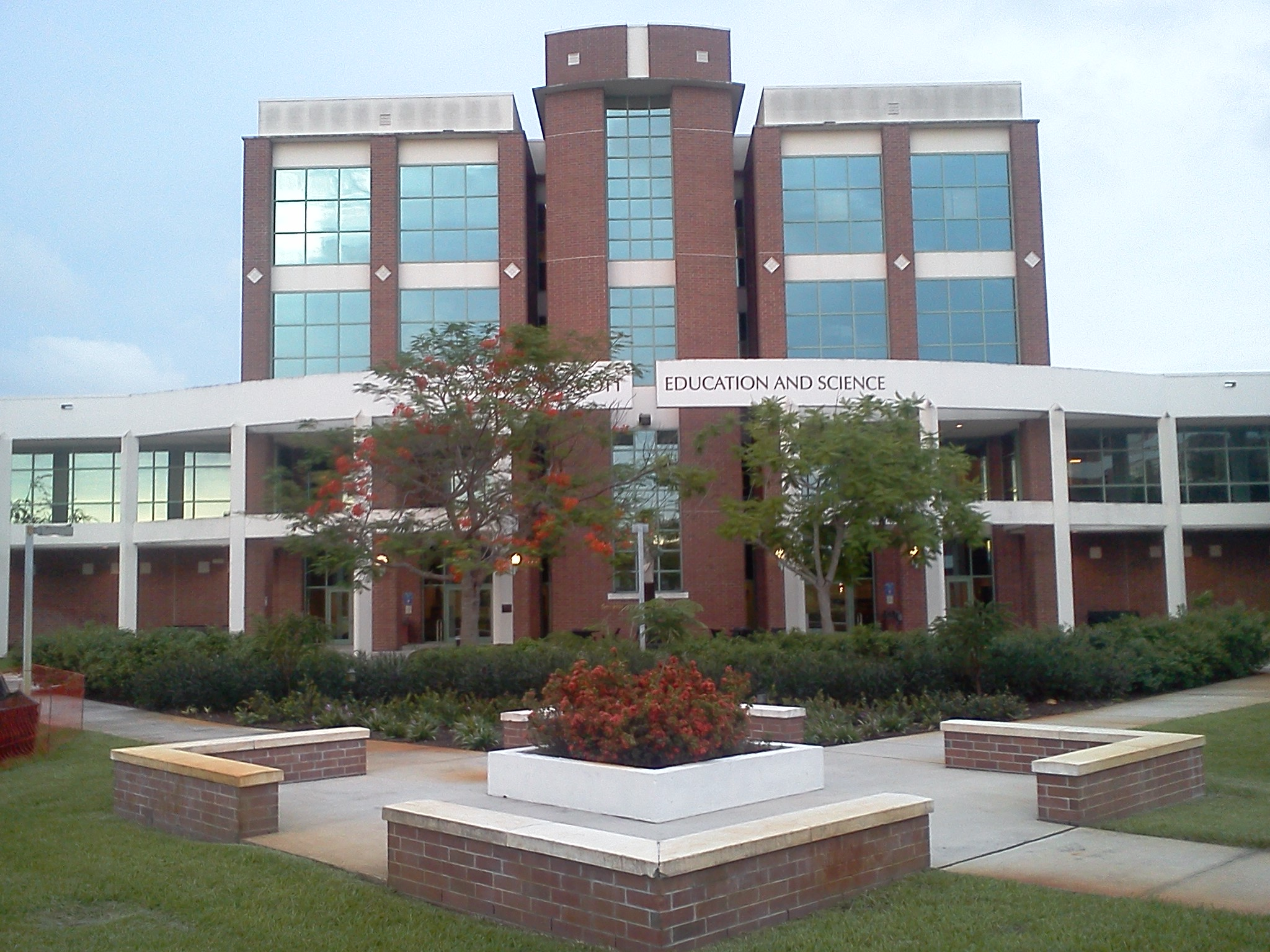
Senator James A. Scott Education and Science Building on the FAU Davie campus

The Davie Campus of Florida Atlantic University was established in 1990 on 38 acres (0.15 km^{2}) of land in western Broward County. The campus serves approximately 3,488 students, or 13% of the FAU student body, making it the university's second largest campus by enrollment. The campus features a multi-story student union with offices for student government and student organizations, a multipurpose area and student lounge, a bookstore, and cafeteria. The union also contains a student health center that provides medical services and health counseling. Davie is also the home of "environmental research initiatives focused on Everglades restoration." FAU colleges offering courses at the FAU Davie campus include Social Work and Criminal Justice, Arts and Letters, Business, Education, Nursing, and Science. The campus is located on Broward College's Central Campus. Students may enter BC as freshmen and graduate from FAU with undergraduate degrees in over 14 disciplines. More than 315,000 square feet of carefully designed classrooms, laboratories, and faculty, staff, and student offices are located on this campus along with a shared-use, 112,000-square-foot FAU/BC library designed for the 21st century.

Other support facilities include a shared Childcare Center, a student Wellness Center and a multi-service Student Union. The campus also offers a varied program of student activities provided by the Division of Student Affairs. Students have services they might require for career counseling, wellness, testing and evaluation, tutoring, health services, student government and financial aid, among others. Like a small college within a large university, the Davie Campus is seen as a "model" branch campus for the state of Florida and the nation.

==== Fort Lauderdale ====
The university has two buildings in downtown Fort Lauderdale, both of which are considered part of one Fort Lauderdale campus. The Askew Tower (AT) and the Higher Education Complex (HEC) on Las Olas Boulevard. The campus offers courses in communication, graphic design, architecture, and urban and regional planning. The campus is home to approximately 900 students or 3.2% of the university's student body.

=== St. Lucie County campuses ===
==== Fort Pierce–Harbor Branch Oceanographic Institution ====
In addition to the Treasure Coast Campus, FAU operates a campus in Fort Pierce at the Harbor Branch Oceanographic Institution. Harbor Branch merged with the university in 2007 to become the HBOI at FAU. The Florida Legislature allocated $44 million for the university to acquire the institution and its 600-acre (2.4 km^{2}) campus.

=== Former campuses ===
==== Port St. Lucie–Treasure Coast Campus ====
Treasure Coast Campus of Florida Atlantic University operated through a partnership with Indian River State College (IRSC). Florida Atlantic purchased 50 acres (0.2 km^{2}) of land in Port St. Lucie in 1994. At the end of spring 2012 class term, Florida Atlantic University ended offering classes at the Port St. Lucie campus.

== Athletics ==
Florida Atlantic's 19 varsity sports teams, the Owls, compete in NCAA's Division I. The Owls joined Conference USA for the 2013–14 season. The university's athletics program began in 1979, when Florida Atlantic first started sponsoring intercollegiate teams. Since then, the university has worked to expand the quality of its intercollegiate program by attracting coaches such as Howard Schnellenberger, Carl Pelini, Matt Doherty, Rex Walters, Lane Kiffin, Mike Jarvis, Dusty May, Willie Taggart, Tom Herman and women's softball and golf coach Joan Joyce. The university's colors are FAU Blue, FAU Red, and FAU Silver.

On October 21, 2021, Florida Atlantic accepted the invitation to join the American Conference (The American) and became a full-member on July 1, 2023.

=== Traditions ===
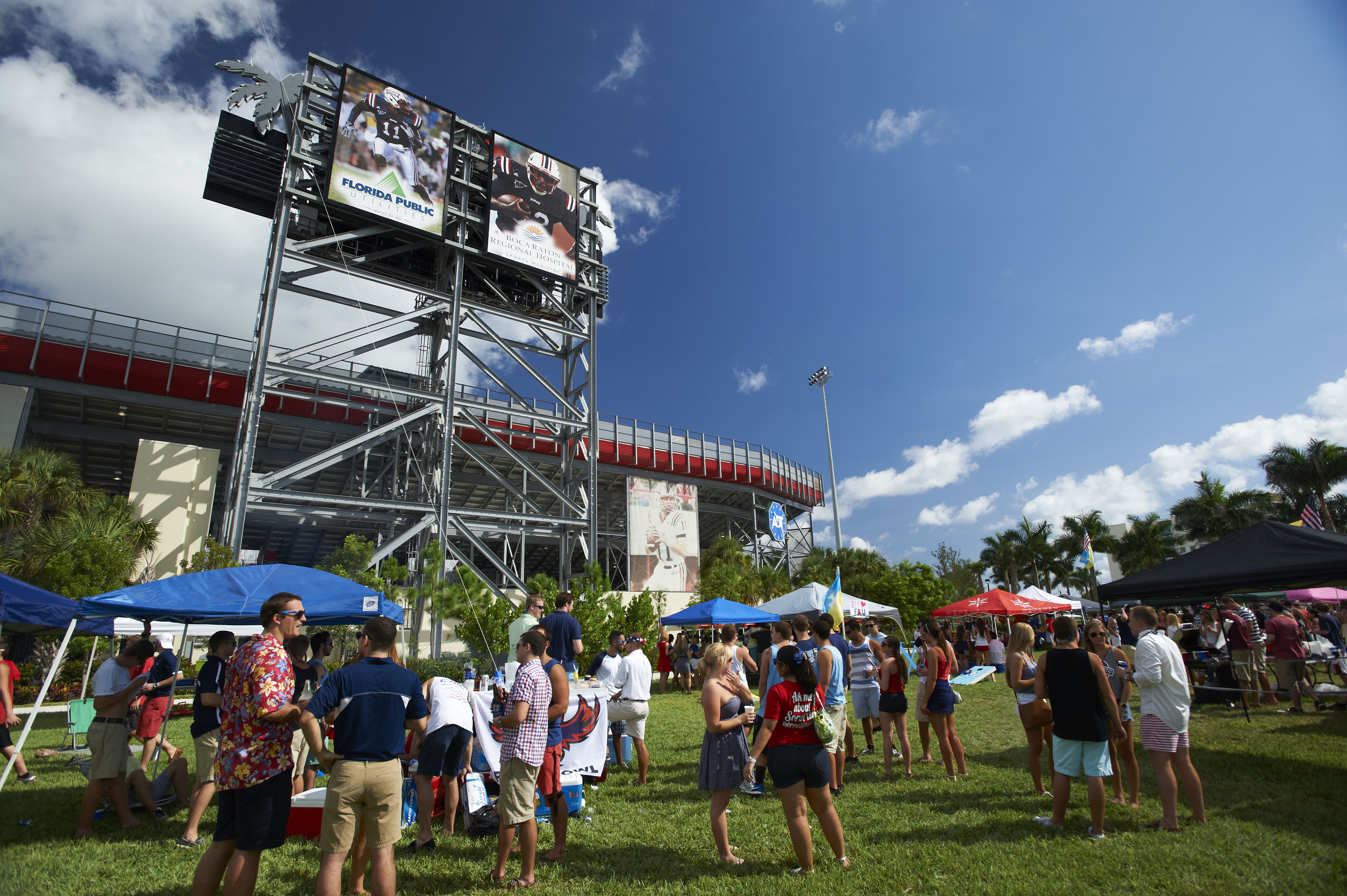
The "Rat's Mouth" student tailgating area located at the grassy area directly in front of FAU Stadium. In 2015, this area was moved to Lot 5 behind the stadium.

FAU is home to a number of sports-related traditions and school spirit organizations.

Every fall before the first football game of the season, FAU's Student Government Association sponsors the annual football "Bonfire" where the opposing team's mascot is burned in effigy. This event typically includes a concert and a speech by the university's head football coach.

Also in football, Florida Atlantic challenges its rival Florida International (FIU) in the annual Shula Bowl. This intercollegiate football game is named after legendary coach Don Shula; so named because at the time of its inception, both head coaches, Florida Atlantic's Howard Schnellenberger and Florida International coach Don Strock, had worked under Shula at some point during their careers. Even though both universities have since moved on to new head coaches, the Shula Bowl is still played. As a home game, the competition takes place at university's own stadium; as an away game, the bowl is played at FIU Stadium.

For basketball, Florida Atlantic celebrates the "Red Hot Madness and Stroll Off" pep rally that introduces fans to the team and coaches, host a number of basketball-related contests such as 3-point shoot-outs and slam dunk competitions, and features step performances by the school's National Pan-Hellenic Council fraternities and sororities. During the regular season, the "Bury the Burrow in Red" event calls for Florida Atlantic students to wear as much red as possible and fill the Burrow, the university's multi-purpose arena, during the annual basketball rivalry game between Florida Atlantic and Florida International University.

The official spirit group supporting Florida Atlantic athletics is the "prOWLers". The group began in February 2002 to support the men's basketball program during the team's run for the Atlantic Sun Conference Championship. The group is funded by the Student Alumni Association, and can now be found at most sporting events cheering for Florida Atlantic. The prOWLers are joined by the Owl Rangers, a fan group that paints their bodies in the Florida Atlantic school colors. The hOWLetts are a student club that attend gameday events and assist in recruiting athletes.

Since 2002, Florida Atlantic students have been using Owl Fingers (the "OK" hand sign) to show school pride and wish the athletic teams luck during football point after attempts (PATs) and basketball free throws.

== Student life ==
Undergraduate demographics as of Fall 2023
Race and ethnicity	Total
White	42%
Hispanic	29%
Black	17%
Asian	4%
Two or more races	4%
International student	3%
Unknown	1%
Economic diversity
Low-income (Note: The percentage of students who received an income-based federal Pell grant intended for low-income students.)	37%
Affluent (Note: The percentage of students who are a part of the American middle class at the bare minimum.)	63%

=== Residential life ===
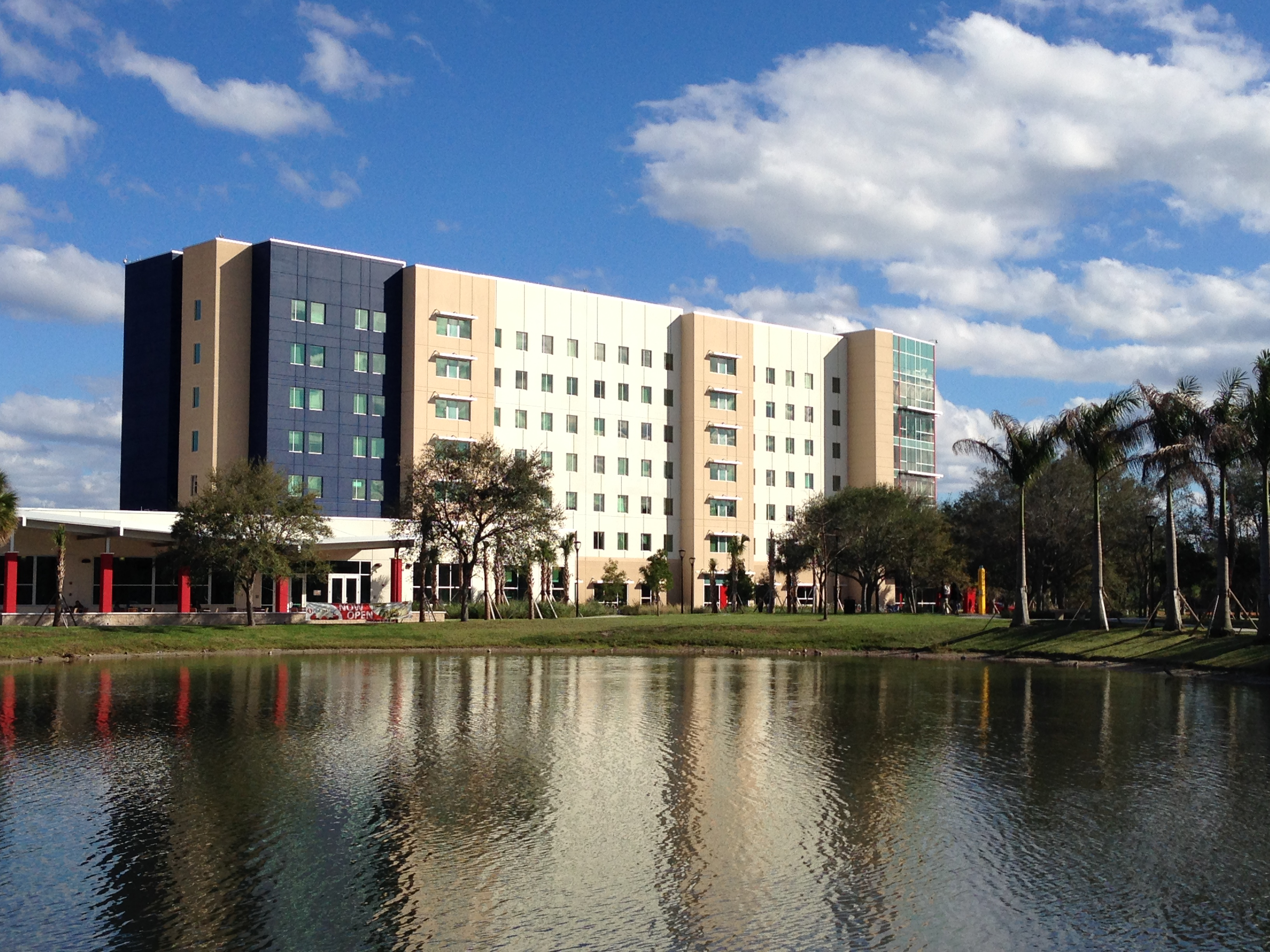
Florida Atlantic University's Parliament Hall on the Boca Raton campus

Residential housing at FAU is available on the Boca Raton and John D. MacArthur campuses. "All full-time freshmen are required to reside in university housing," but "exemptions from this policy are made for students who: are 21 or older by the first day of class, reside with parent(s) or legal guardian(s) within a 50-mile (80 km) radius of the Boca Raton campus, or are married." As of 2021, over 4,000 students live on-campus in Boca Raton. The Wilkes Honors College on the MacArthur Campus requires all students live on-campus within its three residence halls; however, exceptions are made for students who are 26 years of age, married, or have dependent children.

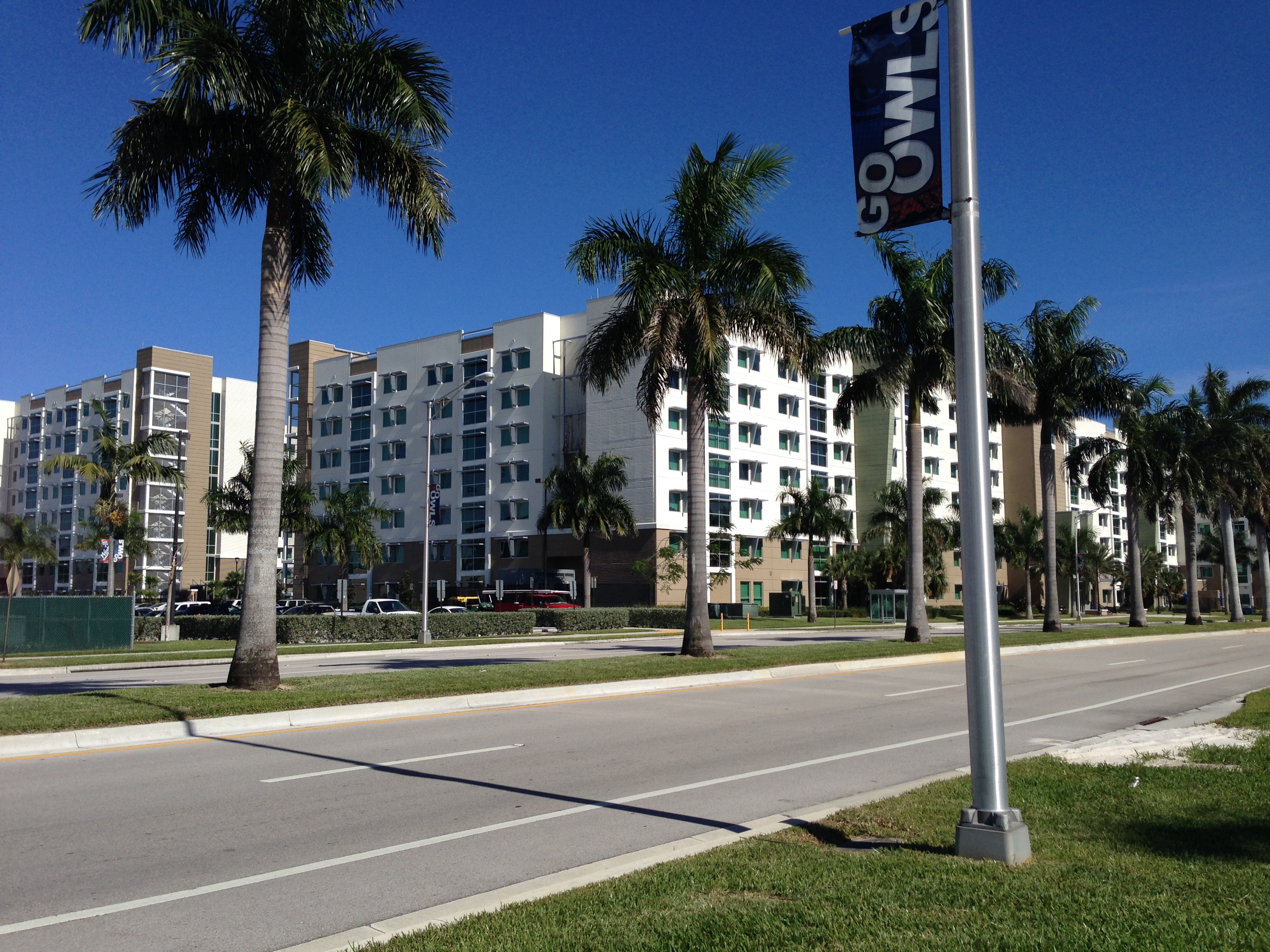
Florida Atlantic University's Innovation Village student apartments on the Boca Raton campus

Boca Raton's on-campus housing facilities are: Indian River Towers (opened 2001), Heritage Park Towers (opened 2004), Glades Park Towers (opened 2007), Parliament Hall (opened 2013), University Village Apartments (UVA), and Innovation Village Apartments (IVA) (opened 2011). Heritage Park and Glades Park Towers each offer 602 beds with 96 single rooms. UVA and IVA exclusively serve upperclassmen while the other residence halls exclusively serve freshmen students. The university also offers upper-division undergraduate and graduate student housing in the Business and Professional Women's Scholarship House for women with a strong academic background.

One of the newest residences on the Boca Raton campus is the Innovation Village Apartments (IVA), consisting of two buildings: IVA North and IVA South. It is a 1,200-bed apartment-style housing facility for upperclassmen, graduate, and medical students. It offers amenities that one would find in a high-rise apartment complex: lounges, retail dining, fitness centers, a pool/cabana, a volleyball court, common areas, and more. The facility opened in fall 2011. FAU's newest residence hall is Parliament Hall, a lakeside freshmen housing facility offering 614 beds, a fitness center, lounges, retail dining, and views of the nearby Atlantic Ocean from top floors.

Within its existing residential life programs, FAU offers a number of Learning Communities for freshmen and students with similar interests and concentrations. Participants meet people with similar interests, live on the same floor and take courses with others in their community, while receiving additional guidance related to those interests. The university's Learning Community programs are divided into two categories, Freshman Learning Communities and Living Learning Communities. The freshman program offers 16 different concentrations, including business, nursing, and education. The Living program offers six concentrations for students residing in the Glades Park Towers dormitory, including engineering, computer science, and a Women's Leadership program.

The university's Department of Housing and Residential Life and the university's fraternities and sororities sponsor a program for freshmen and other students returning to Florida Atlantic in the fall semester. This program, called the "Weeks of Welcome", spans 11 days and all campuses, and works to acclimate students with university life and to build a good on-campus community. On each day, a number of different events are scheduled, including Hall Wars, which are athletic competitions between dormitories, Luaus, and a number of other events. The Weeks of Welcome is the second largest campus-wide event held by Florida Atlantic.

=== Student housing ===
FAU residence hall	Year opened	Students	Accommodations
Business Professional Women's Scholarship House (BPWSH)	1996	16	Female residence requiring dedicated application
Indian River Towers (IRT)	2001	611	Freshmen
Heritage Park Towers (HPT)	2004	603	Freshmen
Glades Park Towers (GPT)	2007	602	Freshmen
Parliament Hall (PAR)	2013	614	Freshmen & upperclassmen
University Village Apartments (UVA)	1995	524	Upperclassmen
Innovation Village Apartments South (IVA-S)	2011	605	Upperclassmen
Innovation Village Apartments North (IVA-N)	2011	611	Upperclassmen
Atlantic Park Towers (APT)	2020	600	Freshmen
Total	–	4,917 students	–

=== Campus organizations and activities ===
FAU has approximately 300 registered student organizations. Among the groups are academic organizations, honor societies, spiritual/religious organizations, diversity-appreciation organizations, service organizations, personal interest organizations, sports clubs, and student government agencies. These clubs and organizations run the gamut from sailing to Ultimate Frisbee, from varsity and club sports and a jazz group to a pottery guild, from political organizations to chess and video game clubs. These organizations are funded by student tuition, from which $12.32 per credit hour goes toward an activities and service fee fund. This generates approximately $10 million per year that is then given to student government for allocation to student clubs and organizations. The student government also finances other student life programs, including career fairs, the University Press, OWL TV and Owl Radio, and Homecoming. Florida Atlantic's homecoming, also known as the "Owl Prowl," is celebrated annually in the fall semester. Events occur mainly on the Boca Raton Campus, but a number of other campuses host their own events as well. In the past, homecoming has had kickoff parties, costumed dances, bonfires, comedy shows, alumni events and dinners, a golf cart parade, and tailgating. Florida Atlantic students have an organized football tailgating area known as the Rat's Mouth. The name references the Spanish translation of Boca Raton.

FAU completed an $18.6 million Recreation and Wellness Center in spring 2010. The facility houses an outdoor leisure and lap pool, a cardio equipment and free weight room, two multipurpose rooms, three indoor courts and health club-style locker rooms. In 2011, the facility won the NIRSA Outstanding Sports Facilities Award. Other recreation facilities include a $4.2 million track and field complex, with synthetic turf (opened January 2007), a ropes challenge course and the 6.5 acre Henderson Fields, utilized most often by the FAU Intramural Sports and Club Sports programs.

=== Greek life ===
FAU is home to approximately 28 chapters of national fraternities and sororities, encompassing approximately 1,077 members or 5% of the undergraduate population. The highpoint of Greek life at Florida Atlantic is "Greek Week". This event is held annually during the spring semester and showcases a number of themed competitions between the university's Greek organizations. There are currently no on-campus Greek houses. However, a Greek Life Housing task force has been formed to explore various housing models, including the cost of construction, "and make recommendations on how to improve the overall quality of the Greek housing...."

== Alumni ==
Since its opening in 1964, Florida Atlantic has awarded degrees to over 185,000 alumni. Among the most influential include:

Rafael "Ralph" de la Vega (B.S. 1974)	Former vice chairman of AT&T Inc. and CEO of AT&T Business Solutions and AT&T International
Fern Kellymeyer (M.A. 1974)	Professional tennis player, administrator, and 1999 ITA Hall of Fame inductee
Patricia McKay (B.B.A. 1978)	Executive vice president, and chief financial officer of Office Depot
Carrie P. Meek (Hon Ph.D.)	Former U.S. congresswoman from Florida's 17th district
Luis Alberto Moreno (B.B.A. 1975)	4th and current president of the Inter-American Development Bank
Aaron Parnas (B.A. 2017)	TikTok journalist, attorney, and influencer with over 7 million social media followers
Maynard Webb (B.A.)	Member of the board of directors of Salesforce.com; former chief operating officer, and president of Technologies for eBay
